= 2020 Tampa Bay Buccaneers season =

45th season in franchise history; second Super Bowl appearance and win

- Owner: The Glazer family
- General manager: Jason Licht
- Head coach: Bruce Arians
- Offensive coordinator: Byron Leftwich
- Defensive coordinator: Todd Bowles
- Home stadium: Raymond James Stadium

Results
- Record: 11–5
- Division place: 2nd NFC South
- Playoffs: Won Wild Card Playoffs (at Washington) 31–23; Won Divisional Playoffs (at Saints) 30–20; Won NFC Championship (at Packers) 31–26; Won Super Bowl LV (vs. Chiefs) 31–9
- All-Pros: LB Devin White (2nd team); LB Lavonte David (2nd team)
- Pro Bowlers: OLB Jason Pierre-Paul

Uniform
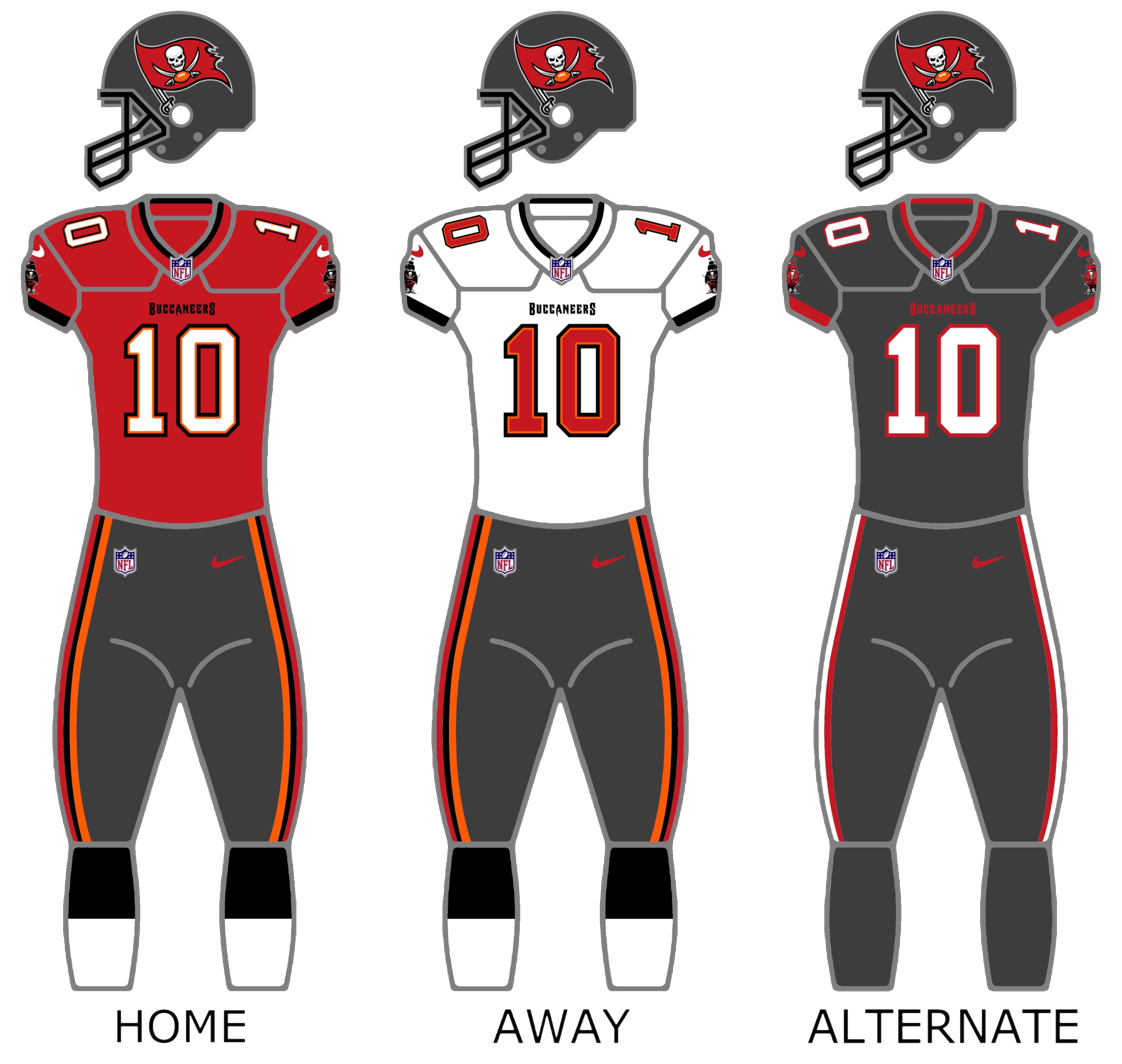

The 2020 season was the Tampa Bay Buccaneers' 45th in the National Football League (NFL) and their second under head coach Bruce Arians. The club acquired long-time New England Patriots quarterback Tom Brady in free agency, and traded for Brady's former Patriots teammate, tight end Rob Gronkowski during the offseason. They improved on their 7–9 record from the previous season by finishing 11–5 to qualify for the playoffs for the first time since 2007, although 10 of their 11 wins were against non-playoff teams. They advanced through the playoffs to reach and win Super Bowl LV. They were the first team only having one Pro Bowler to do so since the 2007 Giants, and the first team to play in and win the Super Bowl in their home stadium, Raymond James Stadium. They were the 7th wild card team in NFL history to win the Super Bowl, as well as the fifth team to win three road games to advance to the Super Bowl, joining the 2010 Green Bay Packers, 2007 New York Giants, 2005 Pittsburgh Steelers, and 1985 New England Patriots. They also became the first team from the NFC South to win the Super Bowl since the New Orleans Saints did in 2009.

The team unveiled new uniforms in April 2020, their first uniform change since 2014. The uniforms are similar in design to the ones they wore from 1997 to 2013.

As of 2026, this remains the Bucs latest NFC Championship and Super Bowl title. This is also the last season where they did not win the NFC South until 2025.

== Season summary ==
The offseason began strong with the team re-signing outside linebacker Jason Pierre-Paul and defensive end Ndamukong Suh. Pierre-Paul and Suh were re-signed after the team placed the franchise tag on outside linebacker Shaquil Barrett, the then-reigning NFL sack leader with 19.5 sacks in 2019. Bringing them back was crucial, as they helped the Buccaneers finish 2019 with the best run defense in the league.

The biggest move was the acquisition of long-time New England Patriots quarterback Tom Brady. At the conclusion of the 2019 season, 2015 first-round draft pick Jameis Winston arrived at the end of his initial five-year contract, resulting in a period of uncertainty at the quarterback position. The club declined to apply the franchise tag to Winston (instead using it on linebacker Shaquil Barrett), nor the transition tag, which was also available for 2020. It thus became clear that the team planned to part ways with Winston. On March 20, 2020, the team agreed to terms with free agent Brady. The Buccaneers also traded for Brady's former Patriots teammate, tight end Rob Gronkowski. They would also sign veterans LeSean McCoy and Leonard Fournette. On October 23, 2020, the Buccaneers signed former All-Pro wide receiver Antonio Brown, marking his return to the NFL after a one-year hiatus.

With high expectations going into the season, the team nevertheless had various growing pains during the season. The team began the season with a loss at New Orleans on Opening Day. The team rebounded to win their next two games in strong fashion. In Week 4 against the Chargers, The Buccaneers rallied from a 17-point deficit to improve to 3–1. After a somewhat embarrassing loss on Thursday night at Chicago in Week 5, the Buccaneers again bounced back, this time with a commanding 38–10 win over the previously undefeated Packers. In that game, Tampa Bay overcame a 10–0 deficit following Jamel Dean's early pick-six. They followed that with a 45-point showing in a win at Las Vegas, and a close Monday Night win at the Giants, to improve their record to 6–2. The month of November saw Tampa Bay hit a skid, as they lost three out of four games. They were routed at home by New Orleans, then dropped close games against both the Rams and Chiefs. Each of those three teams would make the playoffs. Their 38–3 loss to the Saints in Week 9 would set a record as the worst loss by a Super Bowl champion.

Brady later said that playing behind closed doors because of the impact of the COVID-19 pandemic on the NFL made it easier for him to execute his new team's unfamiliar football playbook. With a late season bye week (Week 13), Tampa Bay rested and regrouped, and would not lose another game. The Buccaneers clinched their first winning season since 2016 after a come-from-behind Week 15 win over Atlanta. Despite losing the NFC South division title to rival New Orleans on Christmas Day, the Buccaneers secured a wild card playoff spot the following day with a 47–7 rout over Detroit. It ended the league's second-longest active post-season drought, as Tampa Bay had not reached the playoffs since 2007.

In the Wild Card round, Tampa Bay won their first playoff game since Super Bowl XXXVII, defeating Washington 31–23. They advanced to the Divisional round against the New Orleans Saints, who had swept them in the regular season. Tampa Bay defeated the Saints 30–20 to avenge those losses and advance to the NFC Championship Game. The Buccaneers then beat the top-seeded Green Bay Packers in the NFC Championship Game 31–26 to advance to Super Bowl LV, where they defeated the Kansas City Chiefs 31–9 for their second Super Bowl title.

To win the Super Bowl, the Buccaneers had to defeat three Super Bowl MVP quarterbacks. In order they beat Drew Brees (XLIV), Aaron Rodgers (XLV), and Patrick Mahomes (LIV). They were the first team in NFL history to play in a Super Bowl in its home stadium and the seventh team to win the Super Bowl as a wild card team. They joined the 1985 Patriots, 2005 Steelers, 2007 Giants, and 2010 Packers as the only NFL teams to win three straight playoff games on the road. The team mimicked the 2002 team by also defeating the top-ranked offense in the Super Bowl, and forcing multiple turnovers in the Super Bowl.

Head coach Bruce Arians became the oldest head coach in NFL history to win a Super Bowl while assistant defensive line coach Lori Locust and assistant strength and conditioning coach Maral Javadifar became the first female coaches in NFL history to win a Super Bowl. The Buccaneers also joined the Baltimore Ravens as the only franchises to currently be undefeated in multiple Super Bowl appearances, and now have the most titles of any team in the NFC South. Quarterback Tom Brady won his seventh Super Bowl ring, later revealing that he played the entire season with a torn MCL.

The Buccaneers defense, somewhat maligned over the previous several seasons, improved in several categories. In total yards allowed, they improved from 15th in the league the previous season to 6th. In 2017 they had ranked last. In passing yards allowed, they improved from 30th in 2019 to 21st. In total points allowed, they improved from 29th in 2019 to 8th. They also flipped the turnover margin from –13 in 2019 to +8 in 2020.

Several franchise records were set during the regular season. Tom Brady threw a Buccaneers record 40 touchdown passes, while Mike Evans had a record 13 receiving touchdowns. Evans became the first wide receiver in NFL history with 1,000+ yards receiving in each of his first seven seasons. Brady posted the best season passer rating (102.2) in team history, and also tallied the most games with four or more touchdown passes (4). The team set a new high for most points scored (492) and most total touchdowns (59). Kicker Ryan Succop set a team record for most points by an individual player during a single season with 136. The team also set a club record with eight consecutive overall wins (and ultimately extended the streak to 10 in 2021).

== Roster changes ==
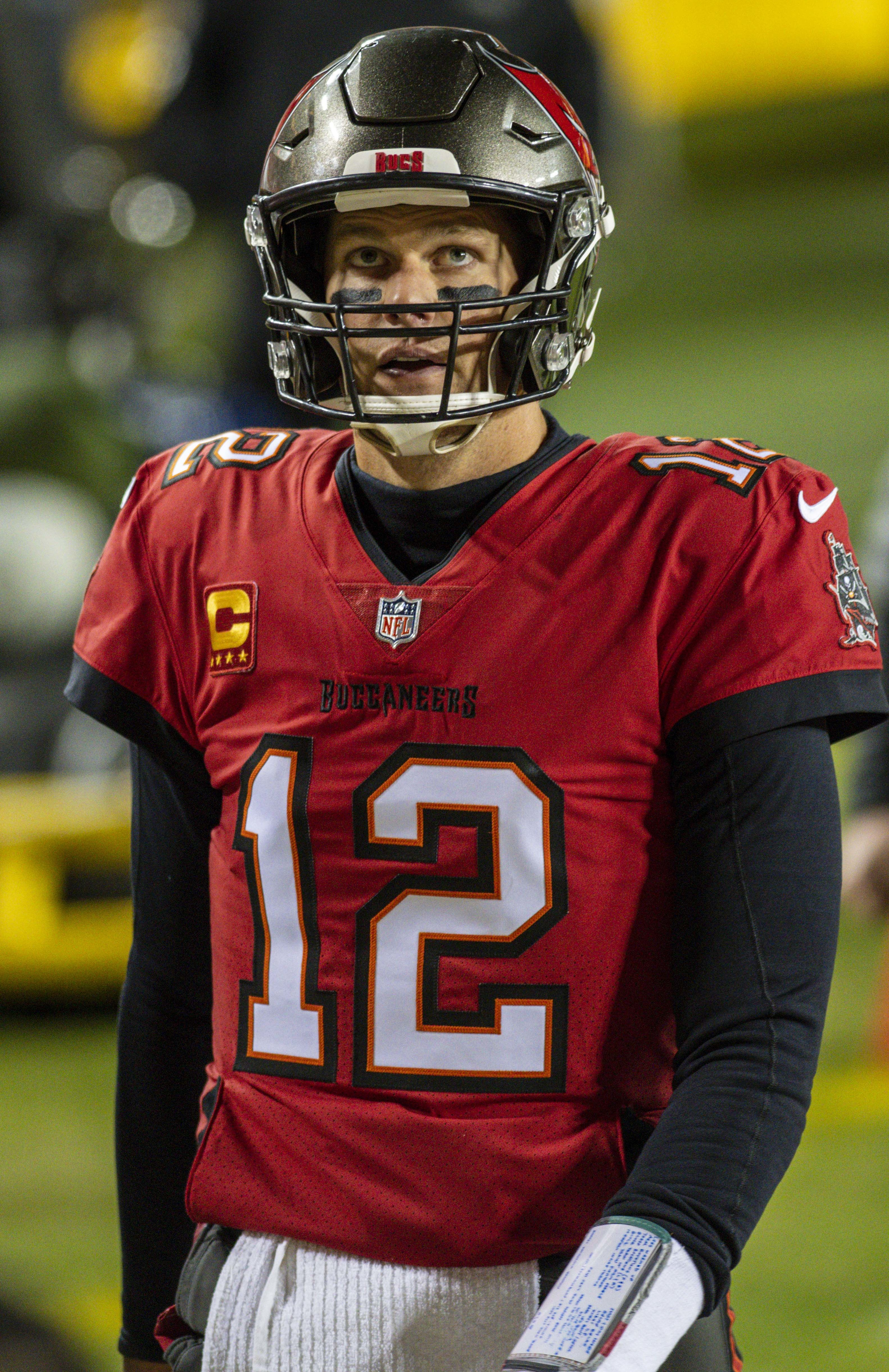
Tampa Bay signed quarterback Tom Brady on March 20, 2020.

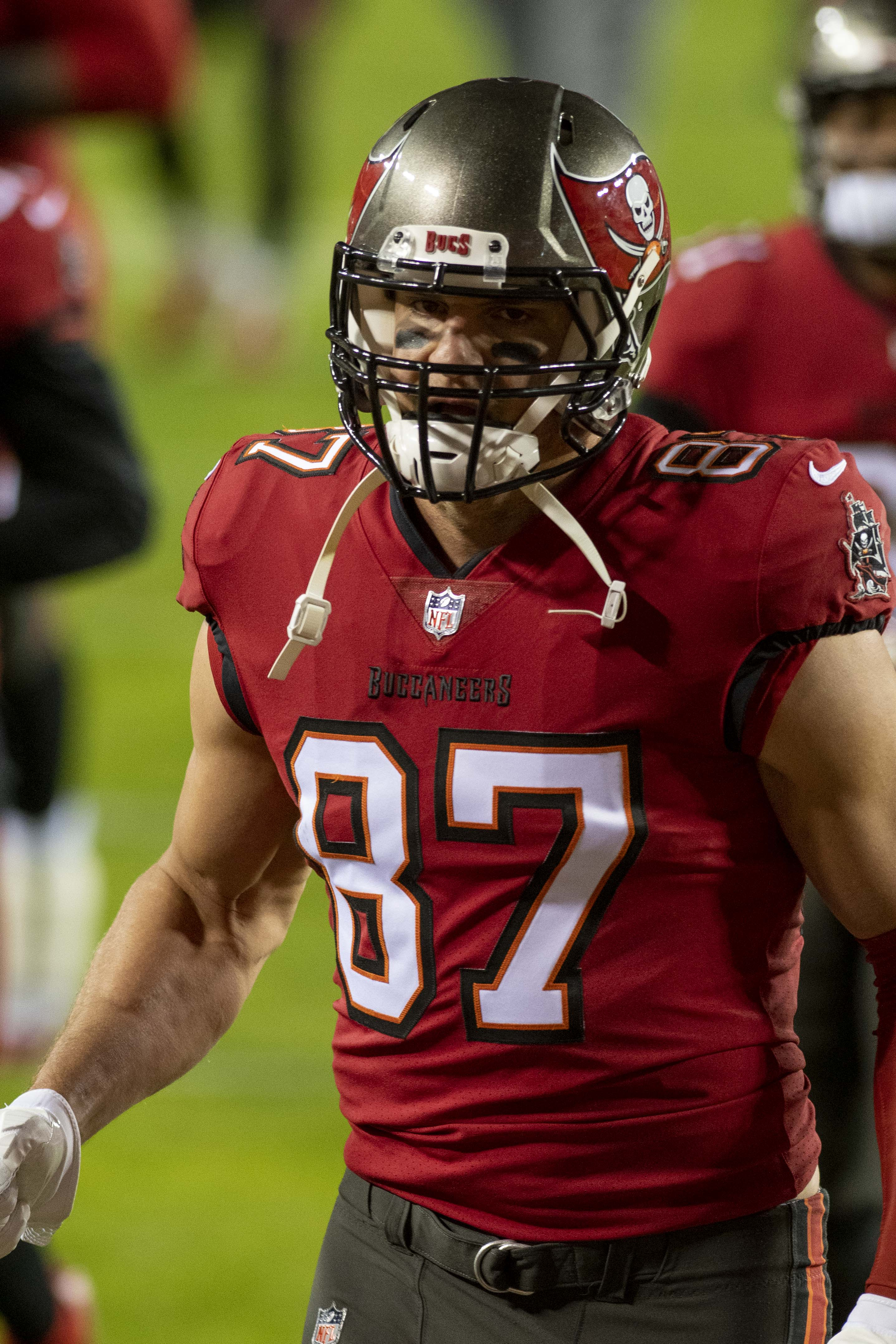
Tight end Rob Gronkowski was traded to Tampa Bay on April 21, 2020.

=== Free agency ===
The Buccaneers entered free agency with the following:

==== Unrestricted ====
Position	Player	2020 team	Date signed	Contract
OLB	Sam Acho			
FS	Andrew Adams	Tampa Bay Buccaneers	March 24, 2020	1 year, $1.01 million
DT	Beau Allen	New England Patriots	March 20, 2020	2 years, $8 million
TE	Antony Auclair	Tampa Bay Buccaneers	March 16, 2020	1 year, amount TBA
RB	Peyton Barber	Washington Redskins	March 26, 2020	2 years, $3 million
OLB	Shaquil Barrett	Tampa Bay Buccaneers	March 16, 2020	Franchise tagged for 1 year, $15.8 million
T	Demar Dotson	Denver Broncos	August 11, 2020	
QB	Blaine Gabbert	Tampa Bay Buccaneers	April 2, 2020	1 year, amount TBA
T	Jerald Hawkins	Pittsburgh Steelers	September 16, 2020,	1 year, $750,000
T	Michael Liedtke	Washington Redskins	May 9, 2020	1 year, amount TBA
WR	Jaydon Mickens	Tampa Bay Buccaneers	May/June, 2020	1 year, amount TBA
ILB	Kevin Minter	Tampa Bay Buccaneers	March 25, 2020	1 year. $1.18 million
WR	Bryant Mitchell	Tampa Bay Buccaneers	March 19, 2020	1 year, amount TBA
OLB	Carl Nassib	Las Vegas Raiders	March 27, 2020	3 years, $25 million
DE	Rakeem Nuñez-Roches	Tampa Bay Buccaneers	March 20, 2020	1 year, $2.25 million
OLB	Jason Pierre-Paul	Tampa Bay Buccaneers	March 17, 2020	2 years, $27 million
WR	Breshad Perriman	New York Jets	April 1, 2020	1 year, $8 million
CB	Ryan Smith	Tampa Bay Buccaneers	March 30, 2020	1 year, $1.75 million
SS	Darian Stewart			
SS	Orion Stewart			
DE	Ndamukong Suh	Tampa Bay Buccaneers	March 26, 2020	1 year, $8 million
G	Earl Watford			
T	Josh Wells	Tampa Bay Buccaneers	May 5, 2020	1 year, $910,000
QB	Jameis Winston	New Orleans Saints	April 28, 2020	1 year, $1.1 million

=== Signings ===
Position	Player	Previous team	Date signed	Contract
QB	Tom Brady	New England Patriots	March 20, 2020	2 years, $50 million
T	Joe Haeg	Indianapolis Colts	March 21, 2020	1 year, $2.3 million
RB	LeSean McCoy	Kansas City Chiefs	July 30, 2020	1 year, $1 million
RB	Leonard Fournette	Jacksonville Jaguars	September 6, 2020	1 year, $3.5 million
WR	Antonio Brown	None	October 27, 2020	1 year, $1.25 million

Indicates that the player was a free agent at the end of his respective team's 2019 season.

=== Trades ===
Player/picks acquired	From	Date traded	Players/picks traded	Source
NT Steve McLendon; 7th-round pick	New York Jets	October 18, 2020	2022 compensatory 6th-round pick	
TE Rob Gronkowski; 7th-round pick	New England Patriots	April 21, 2020	2020 compensatory 4th-round pick (139th overall)	

== NFL draft ==
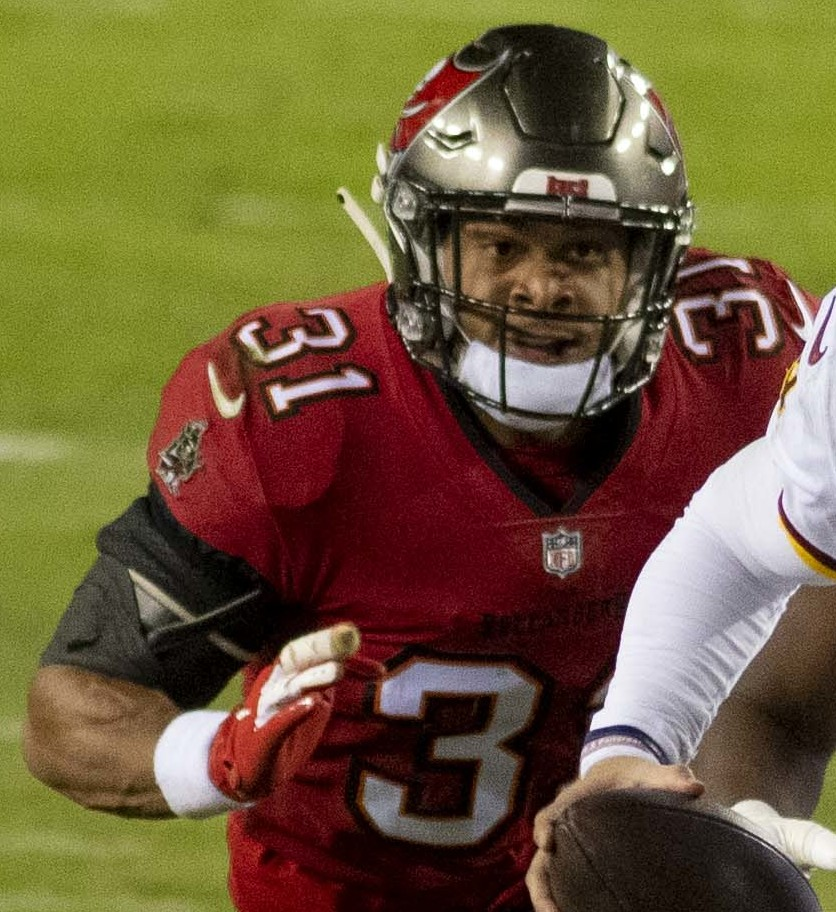
Second-round draft pick Antoine Winfield Jr. was named the Defensive Rookie of the Month for September.

2020 Tampa Bay Buccaneers draft
Round	Pick	Player	Position	College	Notes
1	13	Tristan Wirfs *	OT	Iowa	from Indianapolis via San Francisco
2	45	Antoine Winfield Jr. *	S	Minnesota	
3	76	Ke'Shawn Vaughn	RB	Vanderbilt	
5	161	Tyler Johnson	WR	Minnesota	
6	194	Khalil Davis	DE	Nebraska	
7	241	Chapelle Russell	LB	Temple	from New England
7	245	Raymond Calais	RB	Louisiana-Lafayette	from San Francisco
Made roster † Pro Football Hall of Fame * Made at least one Pro Bowl during career

Draft trades

- The Buccaneers traded their 2020 first-round and 2020 fourth-round selections to the San Francisco 49ers in exchange for San Francisco's 2020 first-round (via Indianapolis) and 2020 seventh-round selections.
- The Buccaneers traded their 2020 seventh-round selection and wide receiver DeSean Jackson to the Philadelphia Eagles in exchange for Philadelphia's sixth-round 2019 selection.

=== Undrafted free agents ===
2020 Tampa Bay Buccaneers Undrafted Free Agents
Player	Position	College	Notes
Michael Divinity	LB	LSU	
Cam Gill	LB	Wagner	
Javon Hagan	S	Ohio	
John Hurst	WR	West Georgia	
Travis Jonsen	WR	Montana State	
Nick Leverett	G	Rice	
John Molchon	G	Boise State	
Parnell Motley	CB	Oklahoma	
Josh Pearson	WR	Jacksonville State	
Nasir Player	LB	East Tennessee State	
Benning Potoa'e	NT	Washington	
Zach Shackelford	C	Texas	
Reid Sinnett	QB	San Diego	

== Staff ==
2020 Tampa Bay Buccaneers staff
Front office: Owner/president – Estate of Malcolm Glazer; Co-chairman – Bryan Glazer; Co-chairman – Edward Glazer; Co-chairman – Joel Glazer; General manager – Jason Licht; Director of player personnel – John Spytek; Director of football operations – Shelton Quarles; Director of college scouting – Mike Biehl; Director of pro scouting – Rob McCartney; Director of football administration – Mike Greenberg; Head coaches: Head coach – Bruce Arians; Assistant head coach/run game coordinator – Harold Goodwin; Assistant to the head coach – Mike Chiurco; Offensive coaches: Offensive coordinator – Byron Leftwich; Quarterbacks – Clyde Christensen; Running backs – Todd McNair; Wide receivers – Kevin Garver; Tight ends – Rick Christophel; Offensive line – Joe Gilbert; Offensive assistant – Antwaan Randle El; Offensive quality control – John Van Dam; Offensive consultant – Tom Moore	Defensive coaches: Defensive coordinator – Todd Bowles; Defensive line – Kacy Rodgers; Assistant defensive line – Lori Locust; Outside linebackers – Larry Foote; Inside linebackers – Mike Caldwell; Cornerbacks – Kevin Ross; Safeties – Nick Rapone; Defensive/special teams assistant – Cody Grimm; Defensive quality control – Tim Atkins; Special teams coaches: Special teams coordinator – Keith Armstrong; Assistant special teams coach – Keith Tandy; Specialists – Chris Boniol; Strength and conditioning: Head strength and conditioning – Anthony Piroli; Speed and conditioning – Roger Kingdom; Assistant strength and conditioning – Michael Stacchiotti; Assistant strength and conditioning – Chad Wade; Assistant strength and conditioning – Maral Javadifar

== Final roster ==
2020 Tampa Bay Buccaneers roster
Quarterbacks (QB): 12 Tom Brady; 11 Blaine Gabbert; 4 Ryan Griffin; 6 Drew Stanton; Running backs (RB): 28 Leonard Fournette; 27 Ronald Jones II; 25 LeSean McCoy; 30 Ke'Shawn Vaughn; Wide receivers (WR): 81 Antonio Brown; 13 Mike Evans; 14 Chris Godwin; 18 Tyler Johnson; 85 Jaydon Mickens RS; 10 Scotty Miller; 17 Justin Watson; Tight ends (TE): 82 Antony Auclair; 84 Cameron Brate; 87 Rob Gronkowski; 88 Tanner Hudson	Offensive linemen (OL): 73 Joe Haeg T; 66 Ryan Jensen C; 62 Ted Larsen G; 74 Ali Marpet G; 76 Donovan Smith T; 64 Aaron Stinnie G; 72 Josh Wells T; 78 Tristan Wirfs T; Defensive linemen (DL): 94 Khalil Davis DE; 92 William Gholston DE; 95 Jeremiah Ledbetter DE; 96 Steve McLendon NT; 56 Rakeem Nuñez-Roches NT; 79 Pat O'Connor DE; 93 Ndamukong Suh DE; 50 Vita Vea NT	Linebackers (LB): 58 Shaquil Barrett OLB; 41 Deone Bucannon MLB; 54 Lavonte David ILB; 49 Cam Gill OLB; 51 Kevin Minter ILB; 98 Anthony Nelson OLB; 90 Jason Pierre-Paul OLB; 45 Devin White ILB; Defensive backs (DB): 26 Andrew Adams SS; 43 Ross Cockrell CB; 24 Carlton Davis CB; 35 Jamel Dean CB; 32 Mike Edwards FS; 23 Sean Murphy-Bunting CB; 29 Ryan Smith CB; 33 Jordan Whitehead SS; 31 Antoine Winfield Jr. FS; Special teams (ST): 8 Bradley Pinion P; 3 Ryan Succop K; 97 Zach Triner LS	Practice squad: 57 Quinton Bell OLB; 15 Cyril Grayson WR; 34 Javon Hagan S; 16 Travis Jonsen WR; 1 Greg Joseph K (Protected); 86 Codey McElroy TE; 36 Herb Miller CB; 75 John Molchon G (Protected); 89 Josh Pearson WR; 91 Benning Potoa'e NT; 52 Garrison Sanborn LS; 71 Kobe Smith DE; 70 Earl Watford G; 9 Matt Wile P; Reserve: 44 Kenjon Barner RB (IR/DFR); 65 Alex Cappa G (IR); 48 Jack Cichy MLB (IR); 5 John Franklin III WR (IR); 80 O. J. Howard TE (IR); 22 T. J. Logan RB (IR); 62 Brad Seaton T (Opt-out); 62 A. Q. Shipley C (IR); Rookies in italics 53 active, 9 reserve, 16 practice squad

== Preseason ==
The Buccaneers' preseason schedule was announced on May 7, but was later cancelled due to the COVID-19 pandemic.

Week	Date	Opponent	Venue	Result
1	August 14	at Pittsburgh Steelers	Heinz Field	Cancelled due to the COVID-19 pandemic
2	August 22	Jacksonville Jaguars	Raymond James Stadium	Cancelled due to the COVID-19 pandemic
3	August 29	Tennessee Titans	Raymond James Stadium	Cancelled due to the COVID-19 pandemic
4	September 3	at Cleveland Browns	FirstEnergy Stadium	Cancelled due to the COVID-19 pandemic

== Regular season ==
=== Schedule ===
The Buccaneers' 2020 schedule was announced on May 7.

Week	Date	Opponent	Result	Record	Venue	Recap
1	September 13	at **New Orleans Saints**	**L** 23–34	0–1	Mercedes-Benz Superdome	Recap
2	September 20	**Carolina Panthers**	**W** 31–17	1–1	Raymond James Stadium	Recap
3	September 27	at Denver Broncos	**W** 28–10	2–1	Empower Field at Mile High	Recap
4	October 4	Los Angeles Chargers	**W** 38–31	3–1	Raymond James Stadium	Recap
5	October 8	at Chicago Bears	**L** 19–20	3–2	Soldier Field	Recap
6	October 18	Green Bay Packers	**W** 38–10	4–2	Raymond James Stadium	Recap
7	October 25	at Las Vegas Raiders	**W** 45–20	5–2	Allegiant Stadium	Recap
8	November 2	at New York Giants	**W** 25–23	6–2	MetLife Stadium	Recap
9	November 8	**New Orleans Saints**	**L** 3–38	6–3	Raymond James Stadium	Recap
10	November 15	at **Carolina Panthers**	**W** 46–23	7–3	Bank of America Stadium	Recap
11	November 23	Los Angeles Rams	**L** 24–27	7–4	Raymond James Stadium	Recap
12	November 29	Kansas City Chiefs	**L** 24–27	7–5	Raymond James Stadium	Recap
13	Bye					
14	December 13	Minnesota Vikings	**W** 26–14	8–5	Raymond James Stadium	Recap
15	December 20	at **Atlanta Falcons**	**W** 31–27	9–5	Mercedes-Benz Stadium	Recap
16	December 26	at Detroit Lions	**W** 47–7	10–5	Ford Field	Recap
17	January 3	**Atlanta Falcons**	**W** 44–27	11–5	Raymond James Stadium	Recap

Note: Intra-division opponents are in bold text.

=== Game summaries ===
==== Week 1: at New Orleans Saints ====
Week One: Tampa Bay Buccaneers at New Orleans Saints – Game summary

Quarter	1	2	3	4	Total
Buccaneers	7	0	10	6	**23**
**Saints**	0	17	7	10	**34**

at Mercedes-Benz Superdome, New Orleans, Louisiana

- Date: September 13
- Game time: 4:25 p.m. EDT/3:25 p.m. CDT
- Game weather: None (indoor stadium)
- Game attendance: 0
- Referee: Jerome Boger
- TV announcers (Fox): Joe Buck, Troy Aikman and Erin Andrews
- Recap, Game Book

Game information

**First quarter**

- TB – Tom Brady 2-yard run (Ryan Succop kick), 7:27. Buccaneers 7–0. **Drive: 9 plays, 85 yards, 4:53.**

**Second quarter**

- NO – Alvin Kamara 12-yard pass from Drew Brees (Wil Lutz kick), 11:39. Tied 7–7. **Drive: 11 plays, 64 yards, 5:38.**
- NO – Alvin Kamara 6-yard run (Wil Lutz kick), 10:09. Saints 14–7. **Drive: 3 plays, 35 yards, 0:47.**
- NO – Wil Lutz 29-yard field goal, 0:44. Saints 17–7. **Drive: 10 plays, 44 yards, 2:53.**

**Third quarter**

- NO – Janoris Jenkins 36-yard interception return (Wil Lutz kick), 13:13. Saints 24–7.
- TB – O. J. Howard 9-yards pass from Tom Brady (Ryan Succop kick), 12:20. Saints 24–14. **Drive: 2 plays, 75 yards, 0:53.**
- TB – Ryan Succop 38-yards field goal, 2:22. Saints 24–17. **Drive: 8 plays, 69 yards, 3:54.**

**Fourth quarter**

- NO – Emmanuel Sanders 5-yards pass from Drew Brees (Wil Lutz kick), 11:38. Saints 31–17. **Drive: 6 plays, 61 yards, 2:25.**
- NO – Wil Lutz 21-yards field goal, 8:01. Saints 34–17. **Drive: 7 plays, 15 yards, 3:37.**
- TB – Mike Evans 2-yards pass from Tom Brady (kick failed), 2:41. Saints 34–23. **Drive: 11 plays, 90 yards, 3:18.**

**Top passers**

- TB – Tom Brady – 23/36, 239 yards, 2 TD, 2 INT
- NO – Drew Brees – 18/30, 160 yards, 2 TD

**Top rushers**

- TB – Ronald Jones – 17 rushes, 66 yards
- NO – Latavius Murray – 15 rushes, 48 yards

**Top receivers**

- TB – Chris Godwin – 6 receptions, 79 yards
- NO – Jared Cook – 5 receptions, 80 yards

Tom Brady made his debut at quarterback with the Buccaneers against division rival New Orleans on opening day. Due to COVID-19, the game was played at the Superdome without spectators. Brady faced Drew Brees, the first game in NFL history where both starting quarterbacks were over the age of 40. Brady led the Buccaneers on a 9-play, 85-yard opening drive, which was capped off by a 2-yard QB keeper, and an early 7–0 lead. Turnovers and miscues by the Buccaneers, however, were the prevailing story of the day. Brady threw two interceptions, one returned for a touchdown, and the Saints won 34–23.

Registering a 13.1 rating, it was the highest-rated regular season game of the 2020 NFL season, and second most-watched measured by total viewers (25.9 million).

==== Week 2: vs. Carolina Panthers ====
Week Two: Carolina Panthers at Tampa Bay Buccaneers – Game summary

Quarter	1	2	3	4	Total
Panthers	0	0	7	10	**17**
**Buccaneers**	14	7	0	10	**31**

at Raymond James Stadium, Tampa, Florida

- Date: September 20
- Game time: 1:00 pm. EDT
- Game weather: Cloudy, 85 °F (29 °C)
- Game attendance: 0
- Referee: John Hussey
- TV announcers (Fox): Adam Amin, Mark Schlereth and Lindsay Czarniak
- Recap, Game Book

Game information

**First quarter**

- TB – Ronald Jones 7-yard run (Ryan Succop kick), 5:42. Buccaneers 7–0. **Drive: 10 plays, 78 yards, 4:17.**
- TB – Mike Evans 23-yard pass from Tom Brady (Ryan Succop kick), 4:38. Buccaneers 14–0. **Drive: 1 play, 23 yards, 0:07.**

**Second quarter**

- TB – Leonard Fournette 1-yard run (Ryan Succop kick), 3:01. Buccaneers 21–0. **Drive: 7 plays, 65 yards, 3:02.**

**Third quarter**

- CAR – Christian McCaffrey 1-yard run (Joey Slye kick), 8:36. Buccaneers 21–7. **Drive: 8 plays, 47 yards, 5:25.**

**Fourth quarter**

- CAR – Christian McCaffrey 7-yard run (Joey Slye kick), 13:25. Buccaneers 21–14. **Drive: 13 plays, 93 yards, 6:19.**
- TB – Ryan Succop 33-yard field goal, 6:13. Buccaneers 24–14. **Drive: 8 plays, 45 yards, 3:57.**
- CAR – Joey Slye 23-yard field goal, 1:57. Buccaneers 24–17. **Drive: 10 plays, 70 yards, 4:16.**
- TB – Leonard Fournette 46-yard run (Ryan Succop kick), 1:48. Buccaneers 31–17. **Drive: 1 play, 46 yards, 0:09.**

**Top passers**

- CAR – Teddy Bridgewater – 33/42, 367 yards, 2 INT
- TB – Tom Brady – 23/35, 217 yards, TD, INT

**Top rushers**

- CAR – Christian McCaffrey – 18 rushes, 59 yards, 2 TD
- TB – Leonard Fournette – 12 rushes, 103 yards, 2 TD

**Top receivers**

- CAR – D. J. Moore – 8 receptions, 120 yards
- TB – Mike Evans – 7 receptions, 104 yards, TD

Tom Brady threw for 217 yards and one touchdown pass, as Tampa Bay defeated Carolina in their home opener, their first win of the season. Due to COVID-19, the game was played at Raymond James Stadium without spectators. Leonard Fournette rushed for 103 yards and two touchdowns, while Mike Evans, who saw limited play in week 1 due to a hamstring injury, rebounded with 104 yards receiving and one touchdown. The Buccaneers jumped out to a 21–0 lead at halftime and held on for a 31–17 victory. The Tampa Bay defense forced four turnovers, and stuffed one fake punt attempt by the Panthers. This game marked the first time Brady beat the Panthers since 2009, and his first win as a Buccaneer.

==== Week 3: at Denver Broncos ====
Week Three: Tampa Bay Buccaneers at Denver Broncos – Game summary

Quarter	1	2	3	4	Total
**Buccaneers**	10	13	5	0	**28**
Broncos	0	10	0	0	**10**

at Empower Field at Mile High, Denver, Colorado

- Date: September 27
- Game time: 4:25 pm. EDT/2:25 p.m. MDT
- Game weather: Partly cloudy, 55 °F (13 °C)
- Game attendance: 5,226
- Referee: Land Clark
- TV announcers (Fox): Adam Amin, Mark Schlereth and Lindsay Czarniak
- Recap, Game Book

Game information

**First quarter**

- TB – Chris Godwin 10-yard pass from Tom Brady (Ryan Succop kick), 9:58. Buccaneers 7–0. **Drive: 3 plays, 10 yards, 0:43.**
- TB – Ryan Succop 43-yard field goal, 0:43. Buccaneers 10–0. **Drive: 10 plays, 30 yards, 4:40.**

**Second quarter**

- DEN – Brandon McManus 56-yard field goal, 11:33. Buccaneers 10–3. **Drive: 7 plays, 37 yards, 3:44.**
- TB – Mike Evans 1-yard pass from Tom Brady (Ryan Succop kick), 6:35. Buccaneers 17–3. **Drive: 12 plays, 75 yards, 4:58.**
- TB – Mike Evans 1-yard pass from Tom Brady (kick blocked), 2:19. Buccaneers 23–3. **Drive: 6 plays, 56 yards, 2:37.**
- DEN – Tim Patrick 7-yard pass from Jeff Driskel (Brandon McManus kick), 0:14. Buccaneers 23–10. **Drive: 8 plays, 75 yards, 2:05.**

**Third quarter**

- TB – Jeff Driskel sacked in end zone by Shaquil Barrett for a safety, 11:44. Buccaneers 25–10.
- TB – Ryan Succop 35-yard field goal, 0:00. Buccaneers 28–10. **Drive: 7 plays, 38 yards, 3:22.**

**Fourth quarter**

- No scoring plays.

**Top passers**

- TB – Tom Brady – 25/38, 297 yards, 3 TD
- DEN – Jeff Driskel – 17/30, 176 yards, TD, INT

**Top rushers**

- TB – Ronald Jones – 13 rushes, 53 yards
- DEN – Melvin Gordon – 8 rushes, 26 yards

**Top receivers**

- TB – Scotty Miller – 3 receptions, 83 yards
- DEN – Jerry Jeudy – 5 receptions, 55 yards

Tom Brady threw for 297 yards and three touchdown passes, and the Buccaneers defense recorded six sacks and two interceptions in a blowout win over the Broncos. It was Tampa Bay's first win over the Broncos since 1999, and first win in Denver since 1993. Shaquil Barrett returned to Empower Field for the first time since the 2018 season, when he played for the Broncos. He punished his old team, and was named NFC Defensive Player of the Week after, totaling 5 solo tackles, 6 total, three tackles for loss, and two sacks, the first of which was a safety.

==== Week 4: vs. Los Angeles Chargers ====
Week Four: Los Angeles Chargers at Tampa Bay Buccaneers – Game summary

Quarter	1	2	3	4	Total
Chargers	14	10	7	0	**31**
**Buccaneers**	7	7	14	10	**38**

at Raymond James Stadium, Tampa, Florida

- Date: October 4
- Game time: 1:00 pm. EDT
- Game weather: Cloudy, 75 °F (24 °C)
- Game attendance: 6,383
- Referee: Brad Allen
- TV announcers (CBS): Ian Eagle, Charles Davis and Evan Washburn
- Recap, Game Book

Game information

**First quarter**

- TB – Cameron Brate 3-yard pass from Tom Brady (Ryan Succop kick), 10:00. Buccaneers 7–0. **Drive: 10 plays, 75 yards, 5:00.**
- LAC – Tyron Johnson 53-yard pass from Justin Herbert (Michael Badgley kick), 8:14. Tied 7–7. **Drive: 4 plays, 75 yards, 1:46.**
- LAC – Michael Davis 78-yard interception return (Michael Badgley kick), 3:55. Chargers 14–7.

**Second quarter**

- LAC – Donald Parham 19-yard pass from Justin Herbert (Michael Badgley kick), 8:50. Chargers 21–7. **Drive: 13 plays, 97 yards, 6:15.**
- LAC – Michael Badgley 53-yard field goal, 8:50. Chargers 24–7. **Drive: 8 plays, 31 yards, 3:17.**
- TB – Mike Evans 6-yard pass from Tom Brady (Ryan Succop kick), 0:22. Chargers 24–14. **Drive: 3 plays, 6 yards, 0:16.**

**Third quarter**

- TB – O. J. Howard 28-yard pass from Tom Brady (Ryan Succop kick), 8:22. Chargers 24–21. **Drive: 8 plays, 69 yards, 4:28.**
- TB – Scotty Miller 19-yard pass from Tom Brady (Ryan Succop kick), 0:52. Buccaneers 28–24. **Drive: 2 plays, 63 yards, 0:48.**
- LAC – Jalen Guyton 72-yard pass from Justin Herbert (Michael Badgley kick), 0:00. Chargers 31–28. **Drive: 3 plays, 75 yards, 0:52.**

**Fourth quarter**

- TB – Ke'Shawn Vaughn 9-yard pass from Tom Brady (Ryan Succop kick), 11:05. Buccaneers 35–31. **Drive: 7 plays, 75 yards, 3:55.**
- TB – Ryan Succop 26-yard field goal, 2:40. Buccaneers 38–31. **Drive: 12 plays, 72 yards, 6:05.**

**Top passers**

- LAC – Justin Herbert – 20/25, 290 yards, 3 TD, INT
- TB – Tom Brady – 30/46, 369 yards, 5 TD, INT

**Top rushers**

- LAC – Justin Herbert – 5 rushes, 14 yards
- TB – Ronald Jones – 20 rushes, 111 yards

**Top receivers**

- LAC – Jalen Guyton – 1 reception, 72 yards, TD
- TB – Mike Evans – 7 receptions, 122 yards, TD

The Chargers jumped out to a 24–7 lead in the second quarter, but the Buccaneers rallied in the second half to win by the score of 38–31. Quarterback Tom Brady, who threw a Pick 6 in the first quarter, rebounded to pass for 369 yards, and 5 touchdown passes (to five different receivers). The Chargers were up by 17 points with less than one minute left in the first half. Ndamukong Suh forced a fumble on Joshua Kelley, and the Buccaneers recovered at the Chargers 6-yard line. Brady's touchdown pass to Mike Evans with 28 seconds left before halftime made the score 24–14, and proved to be the turning point of the game. Tampa Bay scored touchdowns on the first three drives of the second half, and led 38–31 with 2:44 left in the fourth quarter. With 2:35 remaining in regulation, Justin Herbert's pass was intercepted by Carlton Davis near midfield. Tampa Bay ran out the clock, and it was the franchise's biggest comeback win since 2008.

==== Week 5: at Chicago Bears ====
Week Five: Tampa Bay Buccaneers at Chicago Bears – Game summary

Quarter	1	2	3	4	Total
Buccaneers	10	3	3	3	**19**
**Bears**	0	14	0	6	**20**

at Soldier Field, Chicago, Illinois

- Date: October 8
- Game time: 8:20 pm. EDT/7:20 pm. CDT
- Game weather: Clear, 57 °F (14 °C)
- Game attendance: 0
- Referee: Alex Kemp
- TV announcers (Fox/NFLN/Amazon Prime): Joe Buck, Troy Aikman, Erin Andrews and Kristina Pink
- Recap, Game Book

Game information

**First quarter**

- TB – Ryan Succop 39-yard field goal, 9:48. Buccaneers 3–0. **Drive: 11 plays, 54 yards, 5:12.**
- TB – Mike Evans 2-yard pass from Tom Brady (Ryan Succop kick), 0:56. Buccaneers 10–0. **Drive: 5 plays, 50 yards, 2:31.**

**Second quarter**

- TB – Ryan Succop 35-yard field goal, 7:03. Buccaneers 13–0. **Drive: 13 plays, 73 yards, 6:56.**
- CHI – David Montgomery 3-yard run (Cairo Santos kick), 1:48. Buccaneers 13–7. **Drive: 10 plays, 75 yards, 5:15.**
- CHI – Jimmy Graham 12-yard pass from Nick Foles (Cairo Santos kick), 0:36. Bears 14–13. **Drive: 4 plays, 27 yards, 0:55.**

**Third quarter**

- TB – Ryan Succop 46-yard field goal, 9:04. Buccaneers 16–14. **Drive: 5 plays, 40 yards, 3:11.**

**Fourth quarter**

- CHI – Cairo Santos 47-yard field goal, 10:34. Bears 17–16. **Drive: 12 plays, 59 yards, 7:13.**
- TB – Ryan Succop 25-yard field goal, 4:49. Buccaneers 19–17. **Drive: 10 plays, 66 yards, 5:45.**
- CHI – Cairo Santos 38-yard field goal, 1:13. Bears 20–19. **Drive: 9 plays, 32 yards, 1:08.**

**Top passers**

- TB – Tom Brady – 25/41, 253 yards, TD
- CHI – Nick Foles – 30/42, 243 yards, TD, INT

**Top rushers**

- TB – Ronald Jones – 17 rushes, 106 yards
- CHI – David Montgomery – 10 rushes, 29 yards, TD

**Top receivers**

- TB – Cameron Brate – 5 receptions, 44 yards
- CHI – Allen Robinson – 10 receptions, 90 yards

On Thursday Night Football, the Buccaneers jumped out to a 10–0 lead in the first quarter, but it was thwarted as the Bears scored two touchdowns in the final 1:48 of the first half, including a one-handed 12-yard touchdown reception by Jimmy Graham. In the third quarter, the Buccaneers responded with a long field goal, but Bears kicker Cairo Santos countered with a long field goal of his own. The two teams then traded a field goals. Trailing 20–19 in the final minute of regulation, Tampa Bay was driving near midfield. Quarterback Tom Brady threw an incomplete pass, not realizing it was 4th down, which effectively ended the game. Bears quarterback Nick Foles finished with 243 yards, a touchdown, as well as an interception. Tom Brady finished with 253 yards and one touchdown pass to Mike Evans.

With the loss, the Buccaneers dropped to 3–2. Notably, this was Brady's only career loss to the Monsters of the Midway, whom he defeated in five meetings out of five during his two-decade run in New England and defeated a sixth time with the Bucs the following season before retiring.

==== Week 6: vs. Green Bay Packers ====
Week Six: Green Bay Packers at Tampa Bay Buccaneers – Game summary

Quarter	1	2	3	4	Total
Packers	10	0	0	0	**10**
**Buccaneers**	0	28	10	0	**38**

at Raymond James Stadium, Tampa, Florida

- Date: October 18
- Game time: 4:25 pm. EDT
- Game weather: Cloudy, 88 °F (31 °C)
- Game attendance: 15,540
- Referee: Jerome Boger
- TV announcers (Fox): Joe Buck, Troy Aikman and Erin Andrews
- Recap, Game Book

Game information

**First quarter**

- GB – Mason Crosby 39-yard field goal, 10:27. Packers 3–0. **Drive: 10 plays, 54 yards, 4:33.**
- GB – Aaron Jones 1-yard run (Mason Crosby kick), 0:48. Packers 10–0. **Drive: 11 plays, 80 yards, 7:32.**

**Second quarter**

- TB – Jamel Dean 32-yard interception return (Ryan Succop kick), 12:42. Packers 10–7.
- TB – Ronald Jones 2-yard run (Ryan Succop kick), 11:02. Buccaneers 14–10. **Drive: 1 play, 2 yards, 0:03.**
- TB – Tyler Johnson 7-yard pass from Tom Brady (Ryan Succop kick), 4:35. Buccaneers 21–10. **Drive: 11 plays, 65 yards, 6:05.**
- TB – Rob Gronkowski 12-yard pass from Tom Brady (Ryan Succop kick), 1:02. Buccaneers 28–10. **Drive: 7 plays, 62 yards, 1:40.**

**Third quarter**

- TB – Ryan Succop 50-yard field goal, 12:14. Buccaneers 31–10. **Drive: 6 plays, 43 yards, 2:46.**
- TB – Ronald Jones 1-yard run (Ryan Succop kick), 2:40. Buccaneers 38–10. **Drive: 7 plays, 85 yards, 2:47.**

**Fourth quarter**

- No scoring plays.

**Top passers**

- GB – Aaron Rodgers – 16/35, 160 yards, 2 INT
- TB – Tom Brady – 17/27, 166 yards, 2 TD

**Top rushers**

- GB – Jamaal Williams – 4 rushes, 34 yards
- TB – Ronald Jones – 23 rushes, 113 yards, 2 TD

**Top receivers**

- GB – Davante Adams – 6 receptions, 61 yards
- TB – Rob Gronkowski – 5 receptions, 78 yards, TD

Tampa Bay soundly beat previously undefeated Green Bay by the score of 38–10 at Raymond James Stadium, in front of a limited crowd of approximately 25% capacity. Aaron Jones scored a 1-yard touchdown run in the first quarter, as the Packers built a 10–0 lead. But the remainder of the game was dominated by the Buccaneers. Early in the second quarter, Aaron Rodgers' pass was intercepted by Jamel Dean who returned it for a 32-yard touchdown. Three plays later, Rodgers was intercepted again. A tipped pass fell into the hands of Mike Edwards, who ran it back 37 yards to the 2-yard line. Ronald Jones scored the first of two rushing touchdowns, as Tampa Bay took a 14–10 lead. Tom Brady threw two touchdown passes in the second quarter, including his 79th regular season touchdown pass to Rob Gronkowski. The Tampa Bay defense shut out Rodgers and the Packers offense for the rest of the game. Rodgers was sacked five times, and the Packers never crossed midfield in the second half. The Buccaneers also tied a team record with zero penalties, a feat accomplished only once by the club in 1983. This is also their first 4–2 start since 2011.

Down by 28, Rodgers would be benched midway through the fourth quarter and replaced with Tim Boyle. Boyle did not fare well either, as on his third snap, he was sacked by Jason Pierre-Paul. The ball was fumbled, but recovered by the Packers. The game would ultimately be a preview of the NFC Championship Game, in which the Buccaneers beat the top-seeded Packers for the second time this season at Lambeau Field on January 24, 2021.

==== Week 7: at Las Vegas Raiders ====
Week Seven: Tampa Bay Buccaneers at Las Vegas Raiders – Game summary

Quarter	1	2	3	4	Total
**Buccaneers**	7	14	3	21	**45**
Raiders	7	3	7	3	**20**

at Allegiant Stadium, Paradise, Nevada

- Date: October 25
- Game time: 4:05 pm. EDT/1:05 p.m. PDT
- Game weather: None (indoor stadium)
- Game attendance: 0
- Referee: Scott Novak
- TV announcers (Fox): Adam Amin, Mark Schlereth and Lindsay Czarniak
- Recap, Game Book

Game information

**First quarter**

- LV – Nelson Agholor 21-yard pass from Derek Carr (Daniel Carlson kick), 9:55. Raiders 7–0. **Drive: 6 plays, 70 yards, 3:37.**
- TB – Tom Brady 1-yard run (Ryan Succop kick), 5:37. Tied 7–7. **Drive: 10 plays, 77 yards, 4:18.**

**Second quarter**

- LV – Daniel Carlson 42-yard field goal, 14:56. Raiders 10–7. **Drive: 11 plays, 51 yards, 5:46.**
- TB – Rob Gronkowski 5-yard pass from Tom Brady (Ryan Succop kick), 4:21. Buccaneers 14–10. **Drive: 8 plays, 85 yards, 4:32.**
- TB – Scotty Miller 33-yard pass from Tom Brady (Ryan Succop kick), 0:17. Buccaneers 21–10. **Drive: 13 plays, 88 yards, 2:02.**

**Third quarter**

- TB – Ryan Succop 39-yard field goal, 8:16. Buccaneers 24–10. **Drive: 10 plays, 69 yards, 4:45.**
- LV – Darren Waller 1-yard pass from Derek Carr (Daniel Carlson kick), 4:15. Buccaneers 24–17. **Drive: 6 plays, 71 yards, 4:01.**

**Fourth quarter**

- LV – Daniel Carlson 36-yard field goal, 12:43. Buccaneers 24–20. **Drive: 11 plays, 54 yards, 4:40.**
- TB – Chris Godwin 4-yard pass from Tom Brady (Ryan Succop kick), 7:22. Buccaneers 31–20. **Drive: 11 plays, 67 yards, 5:21.**
- TB – Ronald Jones 1-yard run (Ryan Succop kick), 6:40. Buccaneers 38–20. **Drive: 2 plays, 24 yards, 0:29.**
- TB – Tyler Johnson 1-yard pass from Tom Brady (Ryan Succop kick), 3:08. Buccaneers 45–20. **Drive: 6 plays, 32 yards, 2:19.**

**Top passers**

- TB – Tom Brady – 33/45, 369 yards, 4 TD
- LV – Derek Carr – 24/36, 284 yards, 2 TD, INT

**Top rushers**

- TB – Leonard Fournette – 11 rushes, 50 yards
- LV – Jalen Richard – 7 rushes, 24 yards

**Top receivers**

- TB – Scotty Miller – 6 receptions, 109 yards, TD
- LV – Nelson Agholor – 5 receptions, 107 yards, TD

Tampa Bay made their first-ever trip to Las Vegas to face the Raiders. The game was played without spectators. They faced former head coach Jon Gruden for the first time since 1999 and for the first time since Gruden (who was the Buccaneers head coach from 2002 to 2008, winning Super Bowl XXXVII) was fired from the club. Quarterback Tom Brady threw for 369 yards, four touchdown passes, and ran for a touchdown, as the Buccaneers defeated the Raiders 45–20. Derek Carr was sacked three times and intercepted once, as the Tampa Bay defense continued to excel. The Raiders were held to only 76 yards rushing, and the Buccaneers lead the NFL in fewest rushing yards per game allowed. The game was originally scheduled for Sunday Night Football but was moved to 4:05 p.m. after four starting offensive linemen for the Raiders were placed on the reserve/COVID-19 list. Devin White, who was passed on by the Raiders in the 2019 draft, finished with 11 total tackles, 9 solo, two tackles for loss, and 3 sacks.

==== Week 8: at New York Giants ====
Week Eight: Tampa Bay Buccaneers at New York Giants – Game summary

Quarter	1	2	3	4	Total
**Buccaneers**	3	3	9	10	**25**
Giants	7	7	3	6	**23**

at MetLife Stadium, East Rutherford, New Jersey

- Date: November 2
- Game time: 8:15 pm. EST
- Game weather: Fair, 39 °F (4 °C)
- Game attendance: 0
- Referee: Brad Rogers
- TV announcers (ESPN): Steve Levy, Brian Griese, Louis Riddick, Lisa Salters and John Parry
- Recap, Game Book

Game information

**First quarter**

- TB – Ryan Succop 37-yard field goal, 9:41. Buccaneers 3–0. **Drive: 11 plays, 57 yards, 5:19.**
- NYG – Dion Lewis 7-yard pass from Daniel Jones (Graham Gano kick), 4:10. Giants 7–3. **Drive: 3 plays, 12 yards, 0:44.**

**Second quarter**

- NYG – Wayne Gallman 2-yard run (Graham Gano kick), 1:46. Giants 14–3. **Drive: 10 plays, 77 yards, 3:13.**
- TB – Ryan Succop 40-yard field goal, 0:07. Giants 14–6. **Drive: 8 plays, 53 yards, 1:39.**

**Third quarter**

- TB – Ryan Succop 43-yard field goal, 10:00. Giants 14–9. **Drive: 10 plays, 34 yards, 4:03.**
- TB – Rob Gronkowski 3-yard pass from Tom Brady (pass failed), 6:00. Buccaneers 15–14. **Drive: 5 plays, 67 yards, 2:36.**
- NYG – Graham Gano 33-yard field goal, 0:36. Giants 17–15. **Drive: 10 plays, 56 yards, 5:45.**

**Fourth quarter**

- TB – Mike Evans 8-yard pass from Tom Brady (Ryan Succop kick), 9:02. Buccaneers 22–17. **Drive: 6 plays, 66 yards, 3:04.**
- TB – Ryan Succop 38-yard field goal, 3:41. Buccaneers 25–17. **Drive: 8 plays, 47 yards, 3:16.**
- NYG – Golden Tate 19-yard pass from Daniel Jones (pass failed), 0:28. Buccaneers 25–23. **Drive: 13 plays, 70 yards, 3:13.**

**Top passers**

- TB – Tom Brady – 28/40, 279 yards, 2 TD
- NYG – Daniel Jones – 25/41, 256 yards, 2 TD, 2 INT

**Top rushers**

- TB – Leonard Fournette – 15 rushes, 52 yards,
- NYG – Wayne Gallman – 12 rushes, 44 yards, TD

**Top receivers**

- TB – Mike Evans – 5 receptions, 55 yards, TD
- NYG – Sterling Shepard – 8 receptions, 74 yards

Tampa Bay defeated the Giants on Monday Night Football to improve to a record of 6–2, the club's best start since their 2002 Super Bowl-winning season. After a shaky first half for the team, Tom Brady rallied the Buccaneers in the second half for a 25–23 victory. The Giants led 14–6 at halftime, and received the opening kickoff of the second half. On the second play from scrimmage in the third quarter, quarterback Daniel Jones was intercepted by Carlton Davis, which led to a Tampa Bay field goal. After a three-and-out by the Giants, Brady connected with Rob Gronkowski for a 3-yard touchdown pass, and a 15–14 lead. With just over 12 minutes left in regulation, Jones threw his second interception. Hurried and pressured, his pass was picked off by a diving Sean Murphy-Bunting. The turnover led to Brady's second touchdown pass, an 8-yard fingertip grab to a diving Mike Evans in the right corner of the endzone.

In the final three minutes, the Giants were driving for a potential game-tying score. Twice Jones converted on fourth down and long, and connected with Golden Tate for a touchdown with 33 seconds left in regulation. With the score 25–23, the Giants attempted a two-point conversion to tie the game and force overtime. Jones' pass attempt to Dion Lewis was broken up by Antoine Winfield Jr. A flag for pass interference was initially thrown by one of the officials, but after a conference, the flag was picked up and the conversion failed. Tampa Bay held on to win 25–23, their first win at MetLife Stadium, and first win at the Meadowlands since 1997.

==== Week 9: vs. New Orleans Saints ====
Week Nine: New Orleans Saints at Tampa Bay Buccaneers – Game summary

Quarter	1	2	3	4	Total
**Saints**	14	17	0	7	**38**
Buccaneers	0	0	0	3	**3**

at Raymond James Stadium, Tampa, Florida

- Date: November 8
- Game time: 8:20 pm. EST
- Game weather: Cloudy, 77 °F (25 °C)
- Game attendance: 15,740
- Referee: John Hussey
- TV announcers (NBC): Al Michaels, Cris Collinsworth, Michele Tafoya and Terry McAulay
- Recap, Game Book

Game information

**First quarter**

- NO – Tre'Quan Smith 14-yard pass from Drew Brees (Wil Lutz kick), 9:34. Saints 7–0. **Drive: 9 plays, 56 yards, 4:32.**
- NO – Adam Trautman 7-yard pass from Drew Brees (Wil Lutz kick), 0:00. Saints 14–0. **Drive: 5 plays, 35 yards, 2:38.**

**Second quarter**

- NO – Emmanuel Sanders 12-yard pass from Drew Brees (Wil Lutz kick), 11:44. Saints 21–0. **Drive: 5 plays, 50 yards, 2:23.**
- NO – Alvin Kamara 1-yard run (Wil Lutz kick), 8:45. Saints 28–0. **Drive: 5 plays, 27 yards, 2:12.**
- NO – Wil Lutz 36-yard field goal, 1:49. Saints 31–0. **Drive: 8 plays, 44 yards, 3:08.**

**Third quarter**

- No scoring plays.

**Fourth quarter**

- NO – Josh Hill 3-yard pass from Drew Brees (Wil Lutz kick), 9:07. Saints 38–0. **Drive: 10 plays, 70 yards, 6:50.**
- TB – Ryan Succop 48-yard field goal, 5:52. Saints 38–3. **Drive: 7 plays, 45 yards, 3:15.**

**Top passers**

- NO – Drew Brees – 26/32, 222 yards, 4 TD
- TB – Tom Brady – 22/38, 209 yards, 3 INT

**Top rushers**

- NO – Taysom Hill – 7 rushes, 54 yards
- TB – Ronald Jones II – 3 rushes, 9 yards

**Top receivers**

- NO – Michael Thomas – 5 receptions, 51 yards
- TB – Mike Evans – 4 receptions, 64 yards

Tampa Bay hosted New Orleans on Sunday Night Football. The Saints routed the Buccaneers 38–3 to sweep the season series. Tom Brady threw three interceptions in the loss. Tampa Bay snapped a streak of 22 touchdowns scored when facing a "Goal to Go" situation. Early in the third quarter, Tampa Bay recovered a Drew Brees fumble, and subsequently faced a 1st & Goal at the New Orleans 1 yard line. In four plays the Buccaneers could not punch the ball in for a score, and failed to score a touchdown in a game for the first time in two years (Week 10 of 2018). This was the first time in Tom Brady's career that he was swept in two meetings by a division rival in the regular season; it was also the largest margin of defeat for Brady in his career as a starter, surpassing a 31–0 loss to Buffalo in the 2003 season and the worst defeat for an eventual Super Bowl champion in NFL history.

Antonio Brown, signed by Tampa Bay on October 27, made his first appearance with the team. He made three receptions for 31 yards.

==== Week 10: at Carolina Panthers ====
Week Ten: Tampa Bay Buccaneers at Carolina Panthers – Game summary

Quarter	1	2	3	4	Total
**Buccaneers**	7	10	12	17	**46**
Panthers	14	3	0	6	**23**

at Bank of America Stadium, Charlotte, North Carolina

- Date: November 15
- Game time: 1:00 pm. EST
- Game weather: Cloudy, 65 °F (18 °C)
- Game attendance: 5,815
- Referee: Land Clark
- TV announcers (Fox): Kevin Burkhardt, Daryl Johnston and Pam Oliver
- Recap, Game Book

Game information

**First quarter**

- CAR – Colin Thompson 7-yard pass from Teddy Bridgewater (Joey Slye kick), 8:19. Panthers 7–0. **Drive: 7 plays, 33 yards, 4:00.**
- TB – Cameron Brate 5-yard pass from Tom Brady (Ryan Succop kick), 3:37. Tied 7–7. **Drive: 10 plays, 75 yards, 4:42.**
- CAR – D. J. Moore 24-yard pass from Teddy Bridgewater (Joey Slye kick), 1:45. Panthers 14–7. **Drive: 4 plays, 75 yards, 1:52**

**Second quarter**

- TB – Ryan Succop 23-yard field goal, 9:59. Panthers 14–10. **Drive: 14 plays, 70 yards, 6:46.**
- CAR – Joey Slye 46-yard field goal, 3:56. Panthers 17–10. **Drive: 10 plays, 47 yards, 6:03.**
- TB – Mike Evans 3-yard pass from Tom Brady (Ryan Succop kick), 0:27. Tied 17–17. **Drive 9 plays, 75 yards, 3:29.**

**Third quarter**

- TB – Ryan Succop 24-yard field goal, 10:58. Buccaneers 20–17. **Drive: 10 plays, 69 yards, 4:02.**
- TB – Ronald Jones II 98-yard run (kick blocked), 7:39. Buccaneers 26–17. **Drive: 1 play, 98 yards, 0:14.**
- TB – Ryan Succop 24-yard field goal, 3:10. Buccaneers 29–17. **Drive: 9 plays, 35 yards, 4:21.**

**Fourth quarter**

- TB – Ryan Succop 40-yard field goal, 12:40. Buccaneers 32–17. **Drive" 8 plays, 13 yards, 3:23.**
- CAR – Teddy Bridgewater 3-yard run (pass failed), 11:23. Buccaneers 32–23. **Drive: 2 plays, 4 yards, 1:17.**
- TB – Tom Brady 1-yard run (Ryan Succop kick), 6:18. Buccaneers 39–23. **Drive: 9 plays, 75 yards, 5:05.**
- TB – Rob Gronkowski 7-yard pass from Tom Brady (Ryan Succop kick), 4:24. Buccaneers 46–23. **Drive: 4 plays, 21 yards, 0:28.**

**Top passers**

- TB – Tom Brady – 28/39, 341 yards, 3 TD
- CAR – Teddy Bridgewater – 18/24, 136 yards, 2 TD, INT

**Top rushers**

- TB – Ronald Jones II – 23 rushes, 192 yards, TD
- CAR – Mike Davis – 7 rushes, 32 yards

**Top receivers**

- TB – Chris Godwin – 6 receptions, 92 yards
- CAR – D. J. Moore – 4 receptions, 96 yards, TD

Ronald Jones II scored on a 98-yard touchdown run, the longest rush and longest play from scrimmage in team history, as Tampa Bay swept the season series against Carolina. The Buccaneers rebounded after their lopsided loss to the Saints the previous week. Quarterback Tom Brady threw for 341 yards and three touchdown passes, and ran for a touchdown, as Tampa Bay racked up 544 yards of total offense. Carolina led 17–10 late in the second quarter, but Mike Evans made a leaping touchdown catch at the back of the endzone with 27 seconds left in the half to tie the game at 17–17. Miscues then began piling up for the Panthers. Teddy Bridgewater threw an apparent 42-yard catch to D. J. Moore, giving the Panthers a chance for a field goal attempt before halftime. But with seconds left, a delay of game penalty on the Buccaneers, followed by a timeout, allowed officials to review the play. The play was overturned, and the half ended. After the Jones touchdown run midway through the third quarter, Bridgewater threw an interception, which led to a Buccaneers field goal. Bridgewater would later leave the game with a knee injury. Tampa Bay scored points on nine straight drives, including a touchdown run by Brady and a touchdown catch by Rob Gronkowski, both in the fourth quarter, to seal the victory. The Bucs swept the Panthers for the first time since 2010.

==== Week 11: vs. Los Angeles Rams ====
Week Eleven: Los Angeles Rams at Tampa Bay Buccaneers – Game summary

Quarter	1	2	3	4	Total
**Rams**	7	10	7	3	**27**
Buccaneers	0	14	3	7	**24**

at Raymond James Stadium, Tampa, Florida

- Date: November 23
- Game time: 8:15 pm. EST
- Game weather: Clear, 69 °F (21 °C)
- Game attendance: 15,730
- Referee: Jerome Boger
- TV announcers (ESPN): Steve Levy, Brian Griese, Louis Riddick, Lisa Salters and John Parry
- Recap, Game Book

Game information

**First quarter**

- LAR – Robert Woods 4-yard pass from Jared Goff (Matt Gay kick), 3:55. Rams 7–0. **Drive: 13 plays, 80 yards, 7:52.**

**Second quarter**

- TB – Mike Evans 9-yard pass from Tom Brady (Ryan Succop kick), 14:10. Tied 7–7. **Drive: 10 plays, 75 yards, 4:45.**
- TB – Leonard Fournette 2-yard run (Ryan Succop kick), 8:35. Buccaneers 14–7. **Drive: 10 plays, 68 yards, 3:25.**
- LAR – Van Jefferson 7-yard pass from Jared Goff (Matt Gay kick), 4:31. Tied 14–14. **Drive: 8 plays, 75 yards, 4:04.**
- LAR – Matt Gay 38-yard field goal, 0:00. Rams 17–14. **Drive: 8 plays, 61 yards, 1:00.**

**Third quarter**

- TB – Ryan Succop 38-yard field goal, 12:41. Tied 17–17. **Drive: 4 plays, 2 yards, 0:51.**
- LAR – Cam Akers 4-yard pass from Jared Goff (Matt Gay kick), 5:39. Rams 24–17. **Drive: 5 plays, 37 yards, 2:03.**

**Fourth quarter**

- TB – Chris Godwin 13-yard pass from Tom Brady (Ryan Succop kick), 3:53. Tied 24–24. **Drive: 7 plays, 44 yards, 3:24.**
- LAR – Matt Gay 40-yard field goal, 2:36. Rams 27–24. **Drive: 8 plays, 53 yards, 1:21.**

**Top passers**

- LAR – Jared Goff – 39/51, 376 yards, 3 TD, 2 INT
- TB – Tom Brady – 26/48, 216 yards, 2 TD, 2 INT

**Top rushers**

- LAR – Malcolm Brown – 3 rushes, 20 yards
- TB – Ronald Jones II – 10 rushes, 24 yards

**Top receivers**

- LAR – Cooper Kupp – 11 receptions, 146 yards
- TB – Antonio Brown – 8 receptions, 57 yards

Quarterbacks Tom Brady and Jared Goff met for the first time since Super Bowl LIII. On Monday Night Football, Goff threw for 376 yards and three touchdown passes, as the Rams held off the Buccaneers to win 27–24. Brady finished the game with only 216 yards passing, and threw two interceptions. After a prolific ground performance the week before, Ronald Jones II was held to only 10 carries for 24 yards rushing. With the game tied 24–24, Matt Gay kicked a 40-yard go-ahead field goal with 2:36 left in regulation. Brady and the Buccaneers then took over, looking to score to win or force overtime. Brady's deep pass was intercepted at the 31-yard line, and the Rams secured the victory. It was the third loss in four primetime appearances for the Buccaneers.

The game was significant in NFL history as it featured the first all-African American officiating crew.

==== Week 12: vs. Kansas City Chiefs ====
Week Twelve: Kansas City Chiefs at Tampa Bay Buccaneers – Game summary

Quarter	1	2	3	4	Total
**Chiefs**	17	3	7	0	**27**
Buccaneers	0	7	3	14	**24**

at Raymond James Stadium, Tampa, Florida

- Date: November 29
- Game time: 4:25 pm. EST
- Game weather: Clear, 81 °F (27 °C)
- Game attendance: 15,950
- Referee: Shawn Hochuli
- TV announcers (CBS): Jim Nantz, Tony Romo, Tracy Wolfson
- Recap, Game Book

Game information

**First quarter**

- KC – Harrison Butker 19-yard field goal, 12:14. Chiefs 3–0. **Drive: 8 plays, 74 yards, 2:46.**
- KC – Tyreek Hill 75-yard pass from Patrick Mahomes (Harrison Butker kick), 6:49. Chiefs 10–0. **Drive: 1 play, 75 yards, 0:10.**
- KC – Tyreek Hill 44-yard pass from Patrick Mahomes (Harrison Butker kick), 1:32. Chiefs 17–0. **Drive: 7 plays, 90 yards, 3:50.**

**Second quarter**

- TB – Ronald Jones II 37-yard pass from Tom Brady (Ryan Succop kick), 4:29. Chiefs 17–7. **Drive: 7 plays, 86 yards, 4:09.**
- KC – Harrison Butker 29-yard field goal, 0:14. Chiefs 20–7. **Drive: 13 plays, 64 yards, 4:15.**

**Third quarter**

- TB – Ryan Succop 26-yard field goal, 11:04. Chiefs 20–10. **Drive: 8 plays, 67 yards, 3:56.**
- KC – Tyreek Hill 20-yard pass from Patrick Mahomes (Harrison Butker kick), 7:00. Chiefs 27–10. **Drive: 7 plays, 75 yards, 4:04.**

**Fourth quarter**

- TB – Mike Evans 31-yard pass from Tom Brady (Ryan Succop kick), 12:44. Chiefs 27–17. **Drive: 8 plays, 75 yards, 2:29.**
- TB – Mike Evans 7-yard pass from Tom Brady (Ryan Succop kick), 4:10. Chiefs 27–24. **Drive: 10 plays, 73 yards, 2:11.**

**Top passers**

- KC – Patrick Mahomes – 37/49, 462 yards, 3 TD
- TB – Tom Brady – 27/41, 345 yards, 3 TD, 2 INT

**Top rushers**

- KC – Clyde Edwards-Helaire – 11 rushes, 37 yards
- TB – Ronald Jones II – 9 rushes, 66 yards

**Top receivers**

- KC – Tyreek Hill – 13 receptions, 269 yards, 3 TD
- TB – Rob Gronkowski – 6 receptions, 106 yards

Tyreek Hill racked up 269 yards receiving and three touchdown passes, much of it in the first half, as the defending Super Bowl champions Kansas City outlasted Tampa Bay by the score of 27–24. The Buccaneers lost their second straight game, and third game in four weeks heading into their bye week.

After trailing 20–7 at halftime, the Buccaneers narrowed the deficit. Tom Brady connected with Rob Gronkowski for a 48-yard completion to the Kansas City 5-yard line. They had to settle, however, for a Ryan Succop field goal. Brady connected with Mike Evans for two fourth quarter touchdowns, and closed to within 3 points with 4:14 remaining in regulation. Needing a defensive stop to get the ball back, the Buccaneers could not contain Patrick Mahomes, who first scrambled for two first downs, and then moments later connected with Hill for a game-clinching first down with 1:15 to go. This was the Buccaneers' first loss to the Chiefs since 1993.

This would be a preview of Super Bowl LV, in which the Buccaneers would knock off the Chiefs this time, 31–9.

==== Week 14: vs. Minnesota Vikings ====
Week Fourteen: Minnesota Vikings at Tampa Bay Buccaneers – Game summary

Quarter	1	2	3	4	Total
Vikings	0	6	8	0	**14**
**Buccaneers**	0	17	6	3	**26**

at Raymond James Stadium, Tampa, Florida

- Date: December 13
- Game time: 1:00 pm. EST
- Game weather: Cloudy, 78 °F (26 °C)
- Game attendance: 16,031
- Referee: Brad Allen
- TV announcers (Fox): Joe Buck, Troy Aikman and Erin Andrews
- Recap, Game Book

Game information

**First quarter**

- No scoring plays.

**Second quarter**

- MIN – Dalvin Cook 1-yard run (kick failed, wide left), 14:17. Vikings 6–0. **Drive: 14 plays, 84 yards, 8:15.**
- TB – Scotty Miller 48-yard pass from Tom Brady (Ryan Succop kick), 7:41. Buccaneers 7–6. **Drive: 4 plays, 74 yards, 1:49.**
- TB – Ronald Jones II 1-yard run (Ryan Succop kick), 0:44. Buccaneers 14–6. **Drive: 10 plays, 56 yards, 3:53.**
- TB – Ryan Succop 18-yard field goal, 0:00. Buccaneers 17–6. **Drive: 4 plays, 71 yards, 0:21.**

**Third quarter**

- TB – Rob Gronkowski 2-yard pass from Tom Brady (kick failed, wide right), 10:09. Buccaneers 23–6. **Drive: 9 plays, 75 yards, 4:51.**
- MIN – Irv Smith Jr. 14-yard pass from Kirk Cousins (Kirk Cousins–Justin Jefferson pass), 1:36. Buccaneers 23–14. **Drive: 15 plays, 75 yards, 8:33.**

**Fourth quarter**

- TB – Ryan Succop 48-yard field goal, 5:16. Buccaneers 26–14. **Drive: 8 plays, 34 yards, 3:44.**

**Top passers**

- MIN – Kirk Cousins – 24/37, 225 yards, TD
- TB – Tom Brady – 15/23, 196 yards, 2 TD

**Top rushers**

- MIN – Dalvin Cook – 22 rushes, 102 yards, TD
- TB – Ronald Jones II – 18 rushes, 80 yards, TD

**Top receivers**

- MIN – Irv Smith Jr. – 4 receptions, 63 yards, TD
- TB – Mike Evans – 3 receptions, 56 yards

Coming off their bye week, and after dropping three of their previous four games, Tampa Bay defeated Minnesota 26–14 to improve to 8–5 and bolster their playoff hopes. Quarterback Tom Brady threw for 196 yards and two touchdown passes, but the stories of the day were the miscues and kicking woes by the Vikings. Kicker Dan Bailey missed three field goals and an extra point. Kirk Cousins was sacked six times and had two fumbles (one lost). Three critical defensive penalties on the Vikings also aided the Buccaneers.

The first quarter was dominated by the Vikings, as Dalvin Cook rushed for 78 yards and one touchdown in the first half alone. But the Vikings could not capitalize on the strong start. After Cook's touchdown run, Bailey missed the extra point. Then the next two Vikings drives ended with missed field goal attempts. Midway through the second quarter, Brady connected to Scotty Miller with a 48-yard touchdown bomb and a 7–6 Tampa Bay lead. With 44 seconds left in the half, a 1-yard touchdown run by Ronald Jones II gave Tampa Bay a 14–6 lead. The Vikings went three-and-out, and punted the ball back to Tampa Bay with 21 seconds to go. Brady's deep pass intended for Rob Gronkowski fell incomplete in the endzone as time expired, but the Vikings were called for Pass Interference. With one untimed play, Ryan Succop kicked a chip-shot field goal, and Tampa Bay led 17–6 at halftime.

On the first drive of the third quarter, Brady and Gronkowski connected for a 2-yard touchdown pass, and a 23–6 lead. Late in the fourth quarter, with Tampa Bay leading 26–14, the Vikings were attempting to rally. On 4th down & 13 with 2:13 left in regulation, Jason Pierre-Paul sacked Kirk Cousins, and stripped the ball away for a turnover. The sack thwarted any chance of a comeback, and the Buccaneers ran out the clock to secure the victory.

Leonard Fournette was inactive (coach's decision) for the game, while Ronald Jones II rushed for 80 yards on 18 carries, including one touchdown.

==== Week 15: at Atlanta Falcons ====
Week Fifteen: Tampa Bay Buccaneers at Atlanta Falcons – Game summary

Quarter	1	2	3	4	Total
**Buccaneers**	0	0	21	10	**31**
Falcons	7	10	7	3	**27**

at Mercedes-Benz Stadium, Atlanta, Georgia

- Date: December 20
- Game time: 1:00 pm. EST
- Game weather: None (retractable roof closed)
- Game attendance: 10,703
- Referee: Brad Rogers
- TV announcers (Fox): Kevin Burkhardt, Daryl Johnston and Pam Oliver
- Recap, Game Book

Game information

**First quarter**

- ATL – Russell Gage 5-yard pass from Matt Ryan (Younghoe Koo kick), 10:34. Falcons 7–0. **Drive: 8 plays, 75 yards, 4:26.**

**Second quarter**

- ATL – Calvin Ridley 12-yard pass from Matt Ryan (Younghoe Koo kick), 7:48. Falcons 14–0. **Drive: 10 plays, 65 yards, 5:10.**
- ATL – Younghoe Koo 32-yard field goal, 0:15. Falcons 17–0. **Drive: 13 plays, 75 yards, 3:29.**

**Third quarter**

- TB – Leonard Fournette 1-yard run (Ryan Succop kick), 11:28. Falcons 17–7. **Drive: 7 plays, 80 yards, 3:32.**
- ATL – Hayden Hurst 7-yard pass from Matt Ryan (Younghoe Koo kick), 7:34. Falcons 24–7. **Drive: 7 plays, 75 yards, 3:54.**
- TB – Chris Godwin 4-yard pass from Tom Brady (Ryan Succop kick), 3:44. Falcons 24–14. **Drive: 8 plays, 75 yards, 3:50.**
- TB – Leonard Fournette 1-yard run (Ryan Succop kick), 0:05. Falcons 24–21. **Drive: 7 plays, 76 yards, 2:48.**

**Fourth quarter**

- TB – Ryan Succop 27-yard field goal, 11:10. Tied 24–24. **Drive: 9 plays, 42 yards, 3:15.**
- ATL – Younghoe Koo 52-yard field goal, 8:22. Falcons 27–24. **Drive: 6 plays, 41 yards, 2:48.**
- TB – Antonio Brown 46-yard pass from Tom Brady (Ryan Succop kick), 6:19. Buccaneers 31–27. **Drive: 4 plays, 78 yards, 2:03.**

**Top passers**

- TB – Tom Brady – 31/45, 390 yards, 2 TD
- ATL – Matt Ryan – 34/49, 356 yards, 3 TD

**Top rushers**

- TB – Leonard Fournette – 14 rushes, 49 yards, 2 TD
- ATL – Ito Smith – 6 rushes, 24 yards

**Top receivers**

- TB – Mike Evans – 6 receptions, 110 yards
- ATL – Calvin Ridley – 10 receptions, 163 yards, TD

The Atlanta Falcons jumped out to a 17–0 halftime lead, but Tampa Bay rallied in the second half for a 31–27 victory. Quarterback Tom Brady threw for 390 yards and two touchdown passes - nearly all of it in the second half, as the Buccaneers improved to 9–5 on the season and put themselves on the cusp of clinching a playoff berth.

Matt Ryan racked up 235 passing yards and two touchdown passes in the first half alone, while the Buccaneers were held to only 60 total yards of offense in the first half. Ryan would also pass the 50,000 career passing yards milestone. Brady was mostly ineffective, being sacked twice, and completing only ten passes for 70 yards. Running back Leonard Fournette was held to only three carries for 4 yards. Younghoe Koo kicked a 32-yard field goal with 18 seconds left in the first half, and the Falcons led 17–0 at the half.

The Buccaneers received the ball to start the third quarter, and Brady engineered a spirited comeback. He drove Tampa Bay 80 yards in 7 plays, highlighted by a 32-yard reception to Mike Evans all the way to the 1 yard line. Fournette would pound the ball in for a score on the next play. On their next drive, Brady and Evans connected twice with pivotal catches, which led to another touchdown. With the Falcons leading 24–14 in the closing minutes of the third quarter, the Atlanta defense was called for a double penalty (Pass interference and Face mask) which advanced the Buccaneers to the 17-yard line. Fournette's second touchdown run made the score 24–21 in favor of the Falcons to start the fourth quarter.

The two teams traded field goals, and the Falcons clung to a 27–24 lead. A potential go-ahead touchdown pass from Ryan to Calvin Ridley was knocked away at the last second by Antoine Winfield Jr., then Devin White sacked Ryan for the first time of the game. With 6:19 left in regulation, Brady threw a 46-yard bomb to Antonio Brown for the go-ahead touchdown. It was Brown's first touchdown as a member of the Buccaneers. The Tampa Bay defense stiffened, and forced a three-and-out. With under three minutes left, the Falcons got the ball back, but were pinned at their own 12-yard line. White sacked Ryan for the third time, and two plays later, Atlanta turned the ball over on downs. The Buccaneers managed one first down, and ran out the clock to secure the victory.

==== Week 16: at Detroit Lions ====
Week Sixteen: Tampa Bay Buccaneers at Detroit Lions – Game summary

Quarter	1	2	3	4	Total
**Buccaneers**	13	21	13	0	**47**
Lions	0	0	7	0	**7**

at Ford Field, Detroit, Michigan

- Date: December 26
- Game time: 1:00 pm. EST
- Game weather: None (indoor stadium)
- Game attendance: 0
- Referee: Scott Novak
- TV announcers (NFLN): Adam Amin, Mark Schlereth and Lindsay Czarniak
- Recap, Game Book

Game information

**First quarter**

- TB – Rob Gronkowski 33-yard pass from Tom Brady (kick failed), 11:43. Buccaneers 6–0. **Drive: 6 plays, 82 yards, 3:17.**
- TB – Mike Evans 27-yard pass from Tom Brady (Ryan Succop kick), 7:39. Buccaneers 13–0. **Drive: 4 plays, 80 yards, 2:06.**

**Second quarter**

- TB – Leonard Fournette 4-yard run (Ryan Succop kick), 11:51. Buccaneers 20–0. **Drive: 6 plays, 51 yards, 2:24.**
- TB – Chris Godwin 7-yard pass from Tom Brady (Ryan Succop kick), 4:52. Buccaneers 27–0. **Drive: 7 plays, 91 yards, 4:10.**
- TB – Antonio Brown 12-yard pass from Tom Brady (Ryan Succop kick), 1:14. Buccaneers 34–0. **Drive: 9 plays, 66 yards, 2:06.**

**Third quarter**

- TB – Rob Gronkowski 25-yard pass from Blaine Gabbert (kick failed), 14:50. Buccaneers 40–0. **Drive: 1 play, 25 yards, 0:05.**
- DET – Jamal Agnew 74-yard punt return (Matt Prater kick), 9:20. Buccaneers 40–7.
- TB – Mike Evans 22-yard pass from Blaine Gabbert (Ryan Succop kick), 7:07. Buccaneers 47–7. **Drive: 4 plays, 63 yards, 2:13.**

**Fourth quarter**

- No scoring plays.

**Top passers**

- TB – Tom Brady – 22/27, 348 yards, 4 TDs
- DET – Chase Daniel – 13/18, 86 yards

**Top rushers**

- TB – Ke'Shawn Vaughn – 15 rushes, 62 yards
- DET – D'Andre Swift – 10 rushes, 45 yards

**Top receivers**

- TB – Mike Evans – 10 receptions, 181 yards, 2 TDs
- DET – Danny Amendola – 5 receptions, 37 yards

Tampa Bay clinched a playoff berth for the first time since 2007 defeating Detroit on a record-setting day. The Buccaneers routed the Lions 47–7 at Ford Field on a Saturday afternoon game. The Lions were without multiple members of their coaching staff, due to COVID-19 protocols, and failed to score any points on offense. Quarterback Tom Brady threw for 348 yards and four touchdown passes for a perfect 158.3 passer rating, en route to a 34–0 halftime lead. Brady rested in the second half, and backup Blaine Gabbert took over in the third quarter. The Buccaneers won their third straight game off their bye week, and ended the regular season with a 6–2 road record, tied for the best in team history.

Mike Evans caught ten passes for 181 yards and two touchdowns to bring his season total to 960 yards, just shy of his 7th straight 1,000-yard receiving season. Evans would set an NFL record if he were to become the first player to have 1,000 yards receiving in his first seven seasons. Brady's four touchdown passes put him at 36 total for the year, a single-season franchise record. It was also Brady's 300th career regular season game. The Buccaneers offense had 410 net yards of offense in the first half, and 588 total yards in the game, both club records. The 34–0 halftime lead was the largest such in team history, and the 40-point winning margin was the second-largest in team history.

Trailing 40–0, the Lions finally got on the board midway through the third quarter with a 74-yard punt return touchdown by Jamal Agnew. Quarterback Matthew Stafford left the game early with an ankle injury, and backups David Blough and Chase Daniel combined for only 135 yards, 4 sacks, and 1 interception.

Rob Gronkowski scored on two touchdown passes, and Antonio Brown got his second touchdown reception with the Buccaneers. One day earlier on Christmas Day, New Orleans clinched the NFC South division title. Tampa Bay with the victory, secured a wild card berth, their first playoff appearance in thirteen seasons. It is also their first appearance as a wild card team since 2001. This was the last time the Buccaneers failed to clinched the NFC South until 2025.

==== Week 17: vs. Atlanta Falcons ====
Week Seventeen: Atlanta Falcons at Tampa Bay Buccaneers – Game summary

Quarter	1	2	3	4	Total
Falcons	3	7	10	7	**27**
**Buccaneers**	10	13	0	21	**44**

at Raymond James Stadium, Tampa, Florida

- Date: January 3, 2021
- Game time: 1:00 pm. EST
- Game weather: Cloudy, 65 °F (18 °C)
- Game attendance: 16,009
- Referee: Alex Kemp
- TV announcers (Fox): Chris Myers, Greg Jennings and Jen Hale
- Recap, Game Book

Game information

**First quarter**

- TB – Chris Godwin 29-yard pass from Tom Brady (Ryan Succop Kick), 11:06. Buccaneers 7–0. **Drive: 7 plays, 68 yards, 3:54.**
- ATL – Younghoe Koo 22-yard field goal, 3:33. Buccaneers 7–3. **Drive: 13 plays, 70 yards, 7:33.**
- TB – Ryan Succop 29-yard field goal, 0:07. Buccaneers 10–3. **Drive: 9 plays, 62 yards, 3:26.**

**Second quarter**

- TB – Antonio Brown 25-yard pass from Tom Brady (Ryan Succop kick), 12:30. Buccaneers 17–3. **Drive: 6 plays, 57 yards, 2:14.**
- TB – Ryan Succop 38-yard field goal, 8:44. Buccaneers 20–3. **Drive: 6 plays, 19 yards, 2:27.**
- ATL – Matt Ryan 1-yard run (Younghoe Koo kick), 1:56. Buccaneers 20–10. **Drive: 14 plays, 75 yards, 6:48.**
- TB – Ryan Succop 25-yard field goal, 0:00. Buccaneers 23–10. **Drive: 9 plays, 68 yards, 1:56.**

**Third quarter**

- ATL – Russell Gage 19-yard pass from Matt Ryan (Younghoe Koo kick), 8:49. Buccaneers 23–17. **Drive: 11 plays, 75 yards, 6:11.**
- ATL – Younghoe Koo 21-yard field goal, 0:30. Buccaneers 23–20. **Drive: 15 plays, 79 yards, 6:43.**

**Fourth quarter**

- TB – Ronald Jones II 3-yard run (Ryan Succop kick), 11:13. Buccaneers 30–20. **Drive: 9 plays, 75 yards, 4:17.**
- ATL – Hayden Hurst 1-yard pass from Matt Ryan (Younghoe Koo kick), 8:19. Buccaneers 30–27. **Drive: 6 plays, 75 yards, 2:54.**
- TB – Chris Godwin 4-yard pass from Tom Brady (Ryan Succop kick), 3:54. Buccaneers 37–27. **Drive: 8 plays, 75 yards, 4:25.**
- TB – Antonio Brown 30-yard pass from Tom Brady (Ryan Succop kick), 2:52. Buccaneers 44–27. **Drive: 3 plays, 38 yards, 0:19.**

**Top passers**

- ATL – Matt Ryan – 29/44, 265 yards, 2 TD
- TB – Tom Brady – 26/41, 399 yards, 4 TD, INT

**Top rushers**

- ATL – Brian Hill – 9 rushes, 94 yards
- TB – Ronald Jones II – 12 rushes, 78 yards, TD

**Top receivers**

- ATL – Russell Gage – 9 receptions, 91 yards, TD
- TB – Antonio Brown – 11 receptions, 138 yards, 2 TD

Quarterback Tom Brady threw for 399 yards and four touchdown passes as Tampa Bay swept the Falcons on the season. The Buccaneers finished the regular season with a record of 11–5, their best finish since 2005, and secured the fifth seed in the NFC playoffs. Brady's four touchdown passes brought his season total to 40, a single-season franchise record.

In the first quarter, Mike Evans made three receptions for 46 yards, to become the first player in NFL history to record 1,000+ receiving yards in his first seven seasons. However, on the play after setting the record, Evans was targeted in the endzone, where he slipped on the slick sod. He hyperextended his knee, and was out for the remainder of the game.

With Tampa Bay leading 23–20 after three-quarters, the Buccaneers put the game out of reach in the fourth quarter. Ronald Jones II scored on a rushing touchdown, then Chris Godwin and Antonio Brown each caught their second respective touchdown passes of the game.

=== Standings ===
==== Division ====
NFC South
	W	L	T	PCT	DIV	CONF	PF	PA	STK
^{(2)} New Orleans Saints	12	4	0	.750	6–0	10–2	482	337	W2
^{(5)} Tampa Bay Buccaneers	11	5	0	.688	4–2	8–4	492	355	W4
Carolina Panthers	5	11	0	.313	1–5	4–8	350	402	L1
Atlanta Falcons	4	12	0	.250	1–5	2–10	396	414	L5

==== Conference ====
NFC
#	Team	Division	W	L	T	PCT	DIV	CONF	SOS	SOV	STK
**Division leaders**
1	Green Bay Packers	North	13	3	0	.813	5–1	10–2	.428	.387	W6
2 (Note: New Orleans finished ahead of Seattle based on conference record.)	New Orleans Saints	South	12	4	0	.750	6–0	10–2	.459	.406	W2
3	Seattle Seahawks	West	12	4	0	.750	4–2	9–3	.447	.404	W4
4	Washington Football Team	East	7	9	0	.438	4–2	5–7	.459	.388	W1
**Wild cards**
5	Tampa Bay Buccaneers	South	11	5	0	.688	4–2	8–4	.488	.392	W4
6	Los Angeles Rams	West	10	6	0	.625	3–3	9–3	.494	.484	W1
7 (Note: Chicago finished and clinched the 7th and final playoff spot ahead of Arizona based on better win percentage in common games (against Detroit, the NY Giants, Carolina, and the LA Rams, Chicago finished 3–2, while Arizona finished 1–4).)	Chicago Bears	North	8	8	0	.500	2–4	6–6	.488	.336	L1
**Did not qualify for the postseason**
8	Arizona Cardinals	West	8	8	0	.500	2–4	6–6	.475	.441	L2
9	Minnesota Vikings	North	7	9	0	.438	4–2	5–7	.504	.366	W1
10 (Note: San Francisco finished ahead of the NY Giants based on head-to-head victory. Division tie break was initially used to eliminate Dallas (see below).)	San Francisco 49ers	West	6	10	0	.375	3–3	4–8	.549	.448	L1
11 (Note: NY Giants won tiebreaker over Dallas based on division record.)	New York Giants	East	6	10	0	.375	4–2	5–7	.502	.427	W1
12	Dallas Cowboys	East	6	10	0	.375	2–4	5–7	.471	.333	L1
13 (Note: Carolina finished ahead of Detroit based on head-to-head victory.)	Carolina Panthers	South	5	11	0	.313	1–5	4–8	.531	.388	L1
14	Detroit Lions	North	5	11	0	.313	1–5	4–8	.508	.350	L4
15	Philadelphia Eagles	East	4	11	1	.281	2–4	4–8	.537	.469	L3
16	Atlanta Falcons	South	4	12	0	.250	1–5	2–10	.551	.391	L5
**Tiebreakers** (Note: When breaking ties for three or more teams under the NFL's rules, they are first broken within divisions, then comparing only the highest-ranked remaining team from each division.)

== Postseason ==
=== Schedule ===
Round	Date	Opponent (seed)	Result	Record	Venue	Recap
Wild Card	January 9, 2021	at Washington Football Team (4)	W 31–23	1–0	FedExField	Recap
Divisional	January 17, 2021	at New Orleans Saints (2)	W 30–20	2–0	Mercedes-Benz Superdome	Recap
NFC Championship	January 24, 2021	at Green Bay Packers (1)	W 31–26	3–0	Lambeau Field	Recap
Super Bowl LV	February 7, 2021	Kansas City Chiefs (A1)	W 31–9	4–0	Raymond James Stadium	Recap

=== Game summaries ===
==== NFC Wild Card Playoffs: at (4) Washington Football Team ====
NFC Wild Card Playoffs: (5) Tampa Bay Buccaneers at (4) Washington Football Team – Game summary

Quarter	1	2	3	4	Total
Buccaneers	9	9	0	13	31
Washington	0	7	9	7	23

at FedExField, Landover, Maryland

- Date: January 9, 2021
- Game time: 8:15 p.m. EST
- Game weather: Clear, 40 °F (4 °C)
- Game attendance: 0
- Referee: Scott Novak
- TV announcers (NBC): Mike Tirico, Tony Dungy and Kathryn Tappen
- Recap, Game Book

Game information

First quarter

- TB – Ryan Succop 29-yard field goal, 11:49. Buccaneers 3–0. Drive: 9 plays, 70 yards, 3:11.
- TB – Antonio Brown 36-yard pass from Tom Brady (kick blocked), 2:51. Buccaneers 9–0. Drive: 6 plays, 58 yards, 2:06.

Second quarter

- WAS – J. D. McKissic 2-yard run (Dustin Hopkins kick), 12:59. Buccaneers 9–7. Drive: 10 plays, 75 yards, 4:52.
- TB – Chris Godwin 27-yard pass from Tom Brady (run failed), 10:03. Buccaneers 15–7. Drive: 5 plays, 61 yards, 2:56.
- TB – Ryan Succop 23-yard field goal, 1:50. Buccaneers 18–7. Drive: 10 plays, 82 yards, 4:20.

Third quarter

- WAS – Dustin Hopkins 36-yard field goal, 11:46. Buccaneers 18–10. Drive: 7 plays, 52 yards, 3:14.
- WAS – Taylor Heinicke 8-yard run (pass failed), 2:14. Buccaneers 18–16. Drive: 7 plays, 61 yards, 3:39.

Fourth quarter

- TB – Ryan Succop 38-yard field goal, 13:32. Buccaneers 21–16. Drive: 9 plays, 55 yards, 3:42.
- TB – Leonard Fournette 3-yard run (Ryan Succop kick), 9:11. Buccaneers 28–16. Drive: 7 plays, 69 yards, 3:22.
- WAS – Steven Sims 11-yard pass from Taylor Heinicke (Dustin Hopkins kick), 4:51. Buccaneers 28–23. Drive: 11 plays, 75 yards, 4:20.
- TB – Ryan Succop 37-yard field goal, 2:49. Buccaneers 31–23. Drive: 7 plays, 58 yards, 2:02.

Top passers

- TB – Tom Brady – 22/40, 381 yards, 2 TD
- WAS – Taylor Heinicke – 26/44, 306 yards, TD, INT

Top rushers

- TB – Leonard Fournette – 19 rushes, 93 yards, TD
- WAS – Taylor Heinicke – 6 rushes, 46 yards, TD

Top receivers

- TB – Mike Evans – 6 receptions, 119 yards
- WAS – Cam Sims – 7 receptions, 104 yards

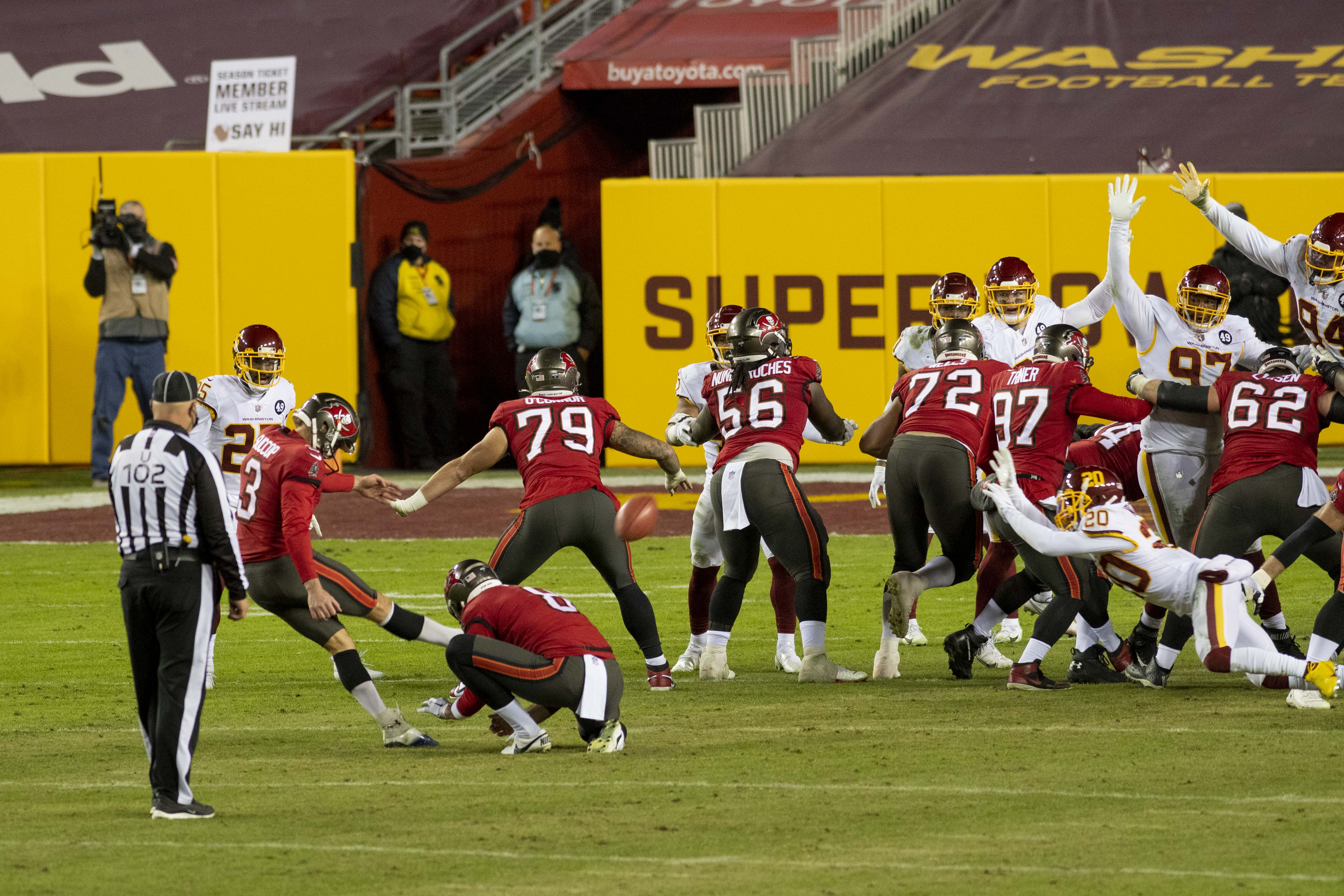
Ryan Succop kicking a field goal during the game

Tampa Bay racked up 507 yards of offense, 3 sacks, and 2 interceptions as they earned their first postseason victory since Super Bowl XXXVII in the 2002 season.

Buccaneers quarterback Tom Brady completed a 30-yard pass to Mike Evans and a 17-yard throw to Chris Godwin as he led the team to a 29-yard Ryan Succop field goal on the game's opening drive. Then after a punt from each team, Tampa Bay defensive back Sean Murphy-Bunting intercepted a pass from Taylor Heinicke on the Buccaneers 42-yard line. Tampa Bay then drove 58 yards in six plays to score on Brady's 36-yard touchdown pass to Antonio Brown, giving the team a 9–0 lead after Succop's extra point was blocked by Jeremy Reaves. But Heinicke stormed right back, starting the next drive with completions to Logan Thomas and Terry McLaurin for gains of 24 and 18 yards before J. D. McKissic finished it off with a 2-yard touchdown run, making the score 9–7 with 12:58 left in the second quarter.

Dustin Hopkins' short kickoff gave the Bucs a first down on their own 39-yard line. On the next play, Brown took a pitch on an end around and ran for a 22-yard gain. Three plays later, Brady threw a 27-yard touchdown pass to Godwin, giving the Bucs a 15–7 lead after their two-point conversion attempt failed. Then after a punt, Brady completed 3/5 passes for 65 yards on an 82-yard drive that ended with Succop's 23-yard field goal, giving Tampa Bay an 18–7 lead going into halftime.

Washington cut their deficit to 18–10 with the opening drive of the third quarter, converting Heinicke's 29-yard completion to Thomas into a 36-yard Hopkins field goal. Later in the period, Washington Defensive tackle Daron Payne forced a fumble from Ke'Shawn Vaughn that Jon Bostic recovered for the Football Team on their 39-yard line. Heinkicke then completed a 19-yard pass to Cam Sims and rushed for a 13-yard gain before taking the ball into the end zone himself on an 8-yard touchdown run, cutting the deficit to 18–16 after an unsuccessful 2-point try. Tampa Bay responded with a 9-play, 55-yard drive, the longest a 23-yard catch by tight end Cameron Brate. Succop finished it off with a 38-yard field goal, giving the Buccaneers a 21–16 lead with 13:38 left in the fourth quarter.

Following a Washington punt, Brady completed passes to Evans for gains of 20 and 19 yards, while Leonard Fournette rushed three times for 22 yards, the last carry a 3-yard touchdown run that put his team up 28–16. Heinicke stormed back, completing 8/10 passes for 71 yards and finishing the drive with an 11-yard touchdown completion to Steven Sims. With the score now 28–23 and 4:57 left on the clock, Brady completed a 35-yard pass to Evans and a 16-yard strike to Godwin, setting up Succop's 37-yard field goal at 3:37. Washington then drove across midfield, but after two incompletions and an 11-yard sack by Lavonte David, Heinicke's 4th down pass was incomplete, enabling Tampa Bay to run out the rest of the game clock.

Brady completed 22/40 passes for 381 yards and two touchdowns. Fournette rushed for 93 yards and a touchdown, while also catching 4 passes for 39 yards. Evans caught 6 passes for 119 yards. David had 8 solo tackles and 1 sack. In just his second NFL start, Heinicke completed 26/44 passes for 302 yards and a touchdown, with one interception. He was also Washington's leading rusher with 6 carries for 46 yards and a score. Sims had 7 receptions for 104 yards. Reaves blocked an extra point and had 9 solo tackles.

==== NFC Divisional Playoffs: at (2) New Orleans Saints ====
NFC Divisional Playoffs: (5) Tampa Bay Buccaneers at (2) New Orleans Saints – Game summary

Quarter	1	2	3	4	Total
Buccaneers	0	13	7	10	30
Saints	6	7	7	0	20

at Mercedes-Benz Superdome, New Orleans, Louisiana

- Date: January 17, 2021
- Game time: 6:40 pm. EST/5:40 p.m. CST
- Game weather: None (indoor stadium)
- Game attendance: 3,750
- Referee: Shawn Hochuli
- TV announcers (Fox): Joe Buck, Troy Aikman, Erin Andrews, and Tom Rinaldi
- Recap, Game Book

Game information

First quarter

- NO – Wil Lutz 23–yard field goal, 11:30. Saints 3–0. Drive: 6 plays, 16 yards, 1:48.
- NO – Wil Lutz 42–yard field goal, 4:39. Saints 6–0. Drive: 12 plays, 46 yards, 5:07.

Second quarter

- TB – Ryan Succop 26–yard field goal, 12:57. Saints 6–3. Drive: 15 plays, 67 yards, 6:42.
- TB – Mike Evans 3–yard pass from Tom Brady (Ryan Succop kick), 11:16. Buccaneers 10–6. Drive: 1 play, 3 yards, 0:04.
- NO – Tre'Quan Smith 56–yard pass from Jameis Winston (Wil Lutz kick), 8:08. Saints 13–10. Drive: 6 plays, 75 yards, 3:08.
- TB – Ryan Succop 37–yard field goal, 0:00. Tied 13–13. Drive: 13 plays, 63 yards, 2:28.

Third quarter

- NO – Tre'Quan Smith 16–yard pass from Drew Brees (Wil Lutz kick), 9:43. Saints 20–13. Drive: 10 plays, 75 yards, 5:17.
- TB – Leonard Fournette 6–yard pass from Tom Brady (Ryan Succop kick), 2:22. Tied 20–20. Drive: 5 plays, 40 yards, 2:08.

Fourth quarter

- TB – Ryan Succop 36–yard field goal, 9:52. Buccaneers 23–20. Drive: 11 plays, 61 yards, 5:52.
- TB – Tom Brady 1–yard run (Ryan Succop kick), 4:57. Buccaneers 30–20. Drive: 4 plays, 20 yards, 2:11.

Top passers

- TB – Tom Brady – 18/33, 199 yards, 2 TD
- NO – Drew Brees – 19/34, 134 yards, TD, 3 INT

Top rushers

- TB – Leonard Fournette – 17 rushes, 63 yards
- NO – Alvin Kamara – 18 rushes, 85 yards

Top receivers

- TB – Cameron Brate – 4 receptions, 50 yards
- NO – Tre'Quan Smith – 3 receptions, 85 yards, 2 TD

Tampa Bay forced four turnovers in a winning effort against a Saints team that had defeated them twice during the regular season. Buccaneers linebacker Devin White led the defensive effort with 10 tackles (1 for loss), 1 assist, a fumble recovery, and an interception.

The Buccaneers had to punt on their opening drive, and Deonte Harris' 43-yard return gave New Orleans a first down on the Tampa 21-yard line, setting up Wil Lutz' 23-yard field goal to take a 3–0 lead. The next time Tampa Bay punted, Harris returned it for a touchdown, but an illegal block penalty negated the score. Still, the team managed to drive 36 yards to a 6–0 lead on Lutz' 44-yard kick. The Bucs responded by moving the ball 65 yards in 15 plays to score on Ryan Succop's 26-yard field goal with 13 minutes left in the second quarter.

On the Saints next drive, defensive back Sean Murphy-Bunting intercepted a pass from Drew Brees and returned it 36 yards to the New Orleans 3-yard line, setting up Tom Brady's 3-yard scoring pass to Mike Evans that gave Tampa Bay a 10–6 lead. New Orleans took the ball back and drove to their 44. On the next play, running back Alvin Kamara took a snap out of wildcat formation and gave the ball to receiver Emmanuel Sanders, who then pitched the ball to backup quarterback Jameis Winston. Winston then threw the ball to Tre'Quan Smith for a 56-yard touchdown, putting the Saints back in the lead at 13–10. Following a punt from each team, the Buccaneers drove 68 yards to tie the score 13–13 with Succop's 37-yard field goal on the last play of the half.

New Orleans opened the third quarter with a 10-play 75-yard drive, with Kamara rushing 4 times for 32 yards and catching a pass for 7. Brees finished the possession with a 16-yard touchdown pass to Smith, giving the Saints a 20–13 lead. The Saints defense then forced a punt, but on their next drive, safety Antoine Winfield Jr. forced a fumble from Jared Cook that White recovered and returned 18 yards to the Saints 40. Brady started the ensuing possession with a 19-yard pass to tight end Cameron Brate, and finished it with a 6-yard touchdown completion to running back Leonard Fournette, tying the game at 20. After a Saints punt, Brady's completions to Tyler Johnson and Scotty Miller for gains of 15 and 29 yards set up Succop's 37-yard field goal, giving Tampa Bay a 23–20 lead with 9:57 left in the game.

White put an end to New Orleans' next drive, intercepting Brees and returning the ball 28 yards to the Saints 20-yard line. Three plays later, Brady scored on a 1-yard sneak that increased the Bucs lead to 30–20 with 4:57 left on the clock. Then Brees was picked off for a third time, this one by safety Mike Edwards, allowing Tampa Bay to run out the clock.

Brady completed 18 of 33 passes for 199 yards and two touchdowns, and scored a rushing touchdown as he advanced to his 14th conference championship game in 21 seasons. Brees was held to just 19/34 completions for 134 yards and a touchdown, while being intercepted three times. Kamara was the top rusher of the game with 18 carries for 85 yards, while also catching 3 passes for 20 yards. Michael Thomas caught 0 passes on four targets, and Mike Edwards caught two interceptions.

==== NFC Championship: at (1) Green Bay Packers ====
NFC Championship: (5) Tampa Bay Buccaneers at (1) Green Bay Packers – Game summary

Quarter	1	2	3	4	Total
Buccaneers	7	14	7	3	31
Packers	0	10	13	3	26

at Lambeau Field, Green Bay, Wisconsin

- Date: January 24, 2021
- Game time: 3:05 pm. EST/2:05 pm. CST
- Game weather: Sunny, 29 °F (−2 °C)
- Game attendance: 7,772
- Referee: Clete Blakeman
- TV announcers (Fox): Joe Buck, Troy Aikman, Erin Andrews and Tom Rinaldi
- Recap, Game Book

Game information

First quarter

- TB – Mike Evans 15-yard pass from Tom Brady (Ryan Succop kick), 10:59. Buccaneers 7–0. Drive: 9 plays, 66 yards, 4:01.

Second quarter

- GB – Marquez Valdes-Scantling 50-yard pass from Aaron Rodgers (Mason Crosby kick), 14:07. Tied 7–7. Drive: 7 plays, 90 yards, 3:42.
- TB – Leonard Fournette 20-yard run (Ryan Succop kick), 3:24. Buccaneers 14–7. Drive: 4 plays, 73 yards, 1:43.
- GB – Mason Crosby 24-yard field goal, 4:59. Buccaneers 14–10. Drive: 15 plays, 69 yards, 7:25.
- TB – Scotty Miller 39-yard pass from Tom Brady (Ryan Succop kick), 0:01. Buccaneers 21–10. Drive: 5 plays, 51 yards, 0:27.

Third quarter

- TB – Cameron Brate 8-yard pass from Tom Brady (Ryan Succop kick), 13:54. Buccaneers 28–10. Drive: 1 plays, 8 yards, 0:04.
- GB – Robert Tonyan 8-yard pass from Aaron Rodgers (Mason Crosby kick), 9:28. Buccaneers 28–17. Drive: 8 plays, 75 yards, 4:26.
- GB – Davante Adams 2-yard pass from Aaron Rodgers (Equanimeous St. Brown pass from Aaron Rodgers failed), 0:24. Buccaneers 28–23. Drive: 13 plays, 60 yards, 7:30.

Fourth quarter

- TB – Ryan Succop 46-yard field goal, 4:42. Buccaneers 31–23. Drive: 8 plays, 44 yards, 3:28.
- GB – Mason Crosby 26-yard field goal, 2:05. Buccaneers 31–26. Drive: 9 plays, 58 yards, 2:37.

Top passers

- TB – Tom Brady – 20/36, 280 yards, 3 TD, 3 INT
- GB – Aaron Rodgers – 33/48, 346 yards, 3 TD, INT

Top rushers

- TB – Leonard Fournette – 12 rushes, 55 yards, TD
- GB – Aaron Jones – 6 rushes, 27 yards

Top receivers

- TB – Chris Godwin – 5 receptions, 110 yards
- GB – Marquez Valdes-Scantling – 4 receptions, 115 yards, TD

Despite giving up more yards and losing more turnovers than Green Bay, Tampa still managed to earn their second Super Bowl appearance in franchise history. With the win, the Buccaneers became the first NFL team in history to play a Super Bowl in their home stadium.

Tampa Bay took the opening kickoff and drove 66 yards on a drive that featured three third down conversions. First, Tom Brady converted a 3rd and 4 with a 27-yard pass to Mike Evans. Then on 3rd and 9, he threw a 14-yard completion to Chris Godwin. Finally, Brady finished the possession with a 15-yard touchdown pass to Evans on 3rd and 7, giving the Buccaneers a 7–0 lead. Following a punt from each team, Green Bay tied the score 7–7 on a 90-yard drive in which Aaron Rodgers converted a 3rd and 15 with a 23-yard pass to Allen Lazard before throwing a 50-yard touchdown completion to Marquez Valdes-Scantling. Tampa Bay took the ball back, and made another big 3rd down conversion with Brady's 52-yard pass to Godwin on 3rd and 9. On the next play, Leonard Fournette's 20-yard touchdown run made the score 14–7 with 12:30 left in the second quarter.

Green Bay responded by driving 69 yards in 15 plays to cut the score to 14–10 with Mason Crosby's 24-yard field goal. Their defense then forced a punt, but on the Packers next drive, Sean Murphy-Bunting intercepted a pass from Rodgers on the Bucs 49-yard line with 27 seconds left in the half. Tampa Bay then drove to a 4th & 4 on the Packers 45, managing to convert it with a 6-yard catch by Fournette. With the ball on the Green Bay 39 and only 8 seconds remaining in the half, Tampa Bay decided against attempting a long field goal, and elected to run one more play from scrimmage. Brady seemingly caught the Packers secondary off-guard, and threw a deep bomb to the front-left corner of the endzone. Scotty Miller had gotten behind cornerback Kevin King, and caught the ball at the goal line for a 39-yard touchdown with 1 second left. The half ended with Tampa Bay ahead 21–10. In the first half alone, Brady completed 13 of 22 passes for 202 yards and two touchdowns.

Two plays into the third quarter, safety Jordan Whitehead forced a fumble from Packers running back Aaron Jones. Devin White recovered it for Tampa Bay and returned it 21 yards to the Green Bay 8-yard line. On the next play, Tampa Bay fooled the Packers defense with a play-action pass, with Brady faking a handoff in the backfield before throwing the ball to tight end Cameron Brate for a touchdown and a 28–10 lead. Green Bay stormed right back, with Rodgers completing 5 of 6 passes for 68 yards and finishing the drive with an 8-yard touchdown throw to tight end Robert Tonyan, making the score 28–17. Then safety Adrian Amos intercepted a pass from Brady on the Packers 32-yard line, sparking a 13-play, 68-yard drive that ended with Rodgers'; 2-yard touchdown completion to Davante Adams with 17 seconds left in the period. This cut the deficit to 28–23 after receiver Equanimeous St. Brown dropped Rodgers' pass on a 2-point conversion attempt.

Tampa Bay then drove to the Packers 28-yard line, only to lose the ball again when Brady threw an interception to cornerback Jaire Alexander. Green Bay could not get a first down and had to punt after Shaquil Barrett sacked Rodgers for a 10-yard loss on 3rd and 5. Then Brady was picked off for the third time, throwing another interception to Alexander. Green Bay's next possession fared no better than their last, with Rodgers again being sacked by Barrett and the team again going three-and-out. Tampa Bay took the ball back on their own 28, and went on to drive 44 yards in 8 plays, the longest a 29-yard gain on a screen pass from Brady to Rob Gronkowski. On the last play, Ryan Succop's 46-yard field goal gave the Bucs a 31–23 lead with 4:47 left in the game.

Green Bay then drove to a first and goal from the Buccaneers 8-yard line. After two incompletions, Rodgers appeared to have room to run toward the end zone, but he chose to throw the ball to a well covered Adams, which resulted in another incompletion. Then in a choice that later earned him heavy criticism, coach Matt LaFleur decided not to attempt a tying touchdown on 4th and goal from the 8 with 2:09 left on the clock, instead electing to have Crosby kick a field goal that cut his team's deficit to 5 points, 31–26. This did not pay off as Tampa Bay went on to run out the rest of the clock with three first downs. The Bucs started their ensuing drive with a 9-yard pass from Brady to Evans as the clock ran down to the 2-minute warning. Then Green Bay decided to give the Bucs a first down rather than lose a timeout on a 2nd and 1 play, so they deliberately committed an encroachment penalty. Two plays later on 3rd and 4, defensive back Kevin King was flagged for pass interference while trying to cover Tyler Johnson, giving the Bucs another first down. Tampa Bay went on to clinch the game with Godwin's 6-yard run on third and 5.

Brady completed 20 of 36 passes for 280 yards and three touchdowns, with three interceptions, as he advanced to his 10th Super Bowl in 21 seasons. Godwin was his top target with 5 receptions for 110 yards. White had 9 tackles, 6 assists, and a fumble recovery. Barrett had 3 sacks, while his fellow defensive lineman Jason Pierre-Paul had 2. Rodgers completed 33 of 48 passes for 346 yards and 3 touchdowns, with one interception, as he lost his second consecutive conference championship game and fell to 1–4 overall in Conference title games over his 16 seasons. Valdes-Scantling caught 4 passes for 115 yards and a score. Nose Tackle Kenny Clark had 6 tackles (1 for loss), 2 assists, and a sack.

==== Super Bowl LV: vs. (A1) Kansas City Chiefs ====
Super Bowl LV: (A1) Kansas City Chiefs vs. (N5) Tampa Bay Buccaneers – Game summary

Quarter	1	2	3	4	Total
Chiefs	3	3	3	0	9
Buccaneers	7	14	10	0	31

at Raymond James Stadium, Tampa, Florida

- Date: February 7, 2021
- Game time: 6:40 pm. EST
- Game weather: 63 °F (17 °C), clear
- Game attendance: 24,835
- Referee: Carl Cheffers
- TV announcers (CBS): Jim Nantz, Tony Romo, Tracy Wolfson, Evan Washburn and Jay Feely
- Recap, Game Book

Game information

First quarter

- KC – Harrison Butker 49-yard field goal, 5:10. Chiefs 3–0. Drive: 8 plays, 31 yards, 3:23.
- TB – Rob Gronkowski 8-yard pass from Tom Brady (Ryan Succop kick), 0:37. Buccaneers 7–3. Drive: 8 plays, 75 yards, 4:33.

Second quarter

- TB – Rob Gronkowski 17-yard pass from Tom Brady (Ryan Succop kick), 6:05. Buccaneers 14–3. Drive: 6 plays, 38 yards, 2:58.
- KC – Harrison Butker 34-yard field goal, 1:01. Buccaneers 14–6. Drive: 10 plays, 61 yards, 5:04.
- TB – Antonio Brown 1-yard pass from Tom Brady (Ryan Succop kick), 0:06. Buccaneers 21–6. Drive: 5 plays, 71 yards, 0:55.

Third quarter

- KC – Harrison Butker 52-yard field goal, 11:26. Buccaneers 21–9. Drive: 7 plays, 47 yards, 3:34.
- TB – Leonard Fournette 27-yard run (Ryan Succop kick), 7:45. Buccaneers 28–9. Drive: 6 plays, 74 yards, 3:41.
- TB – Ryan Succop 52-yard field goal, 2:46. Buccaneers 31–9. Drive: 8 plays, 11 yards, 3:34.

Fourth quarter

- No scoring plays.

Top passers

- KC – Patrick Mahomes – 26/49, 270 yards, 2 INT
- TB – Tom Brady – 21/29, 201 yards, 3 TD

Top rushers

- KC – Clyde Edwards-Helaire – 9 rushes, 64 yards
- TB – Leonard Fournette – 16 rushes, 89 yards, TD

Top receivers

- KC – Travis Kelce – 10 receptions, 133 yards
- TB – Rob Gronkowski – 6 receptions, 67 yards, 2 TD

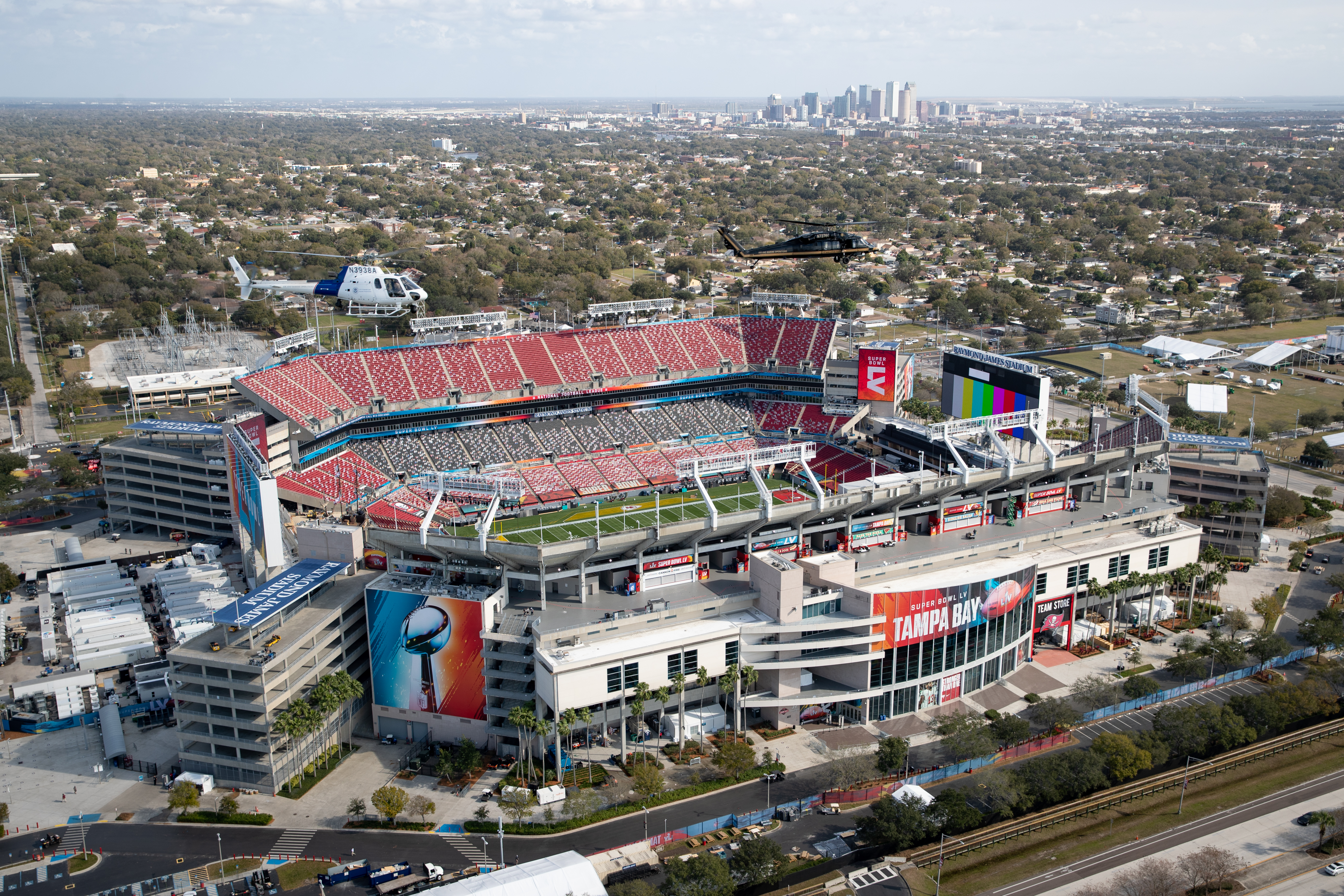
Raymond James Stadium preparing for Super Bowl LV.

With a strong defensive performance and a balanced offense, the Buccaneers easily defeated the defending Super Bowl champion Kansas City Chiefs 31–9 in a rematch of Week 12 from the regular season. This was the Tampa Bay Buccaneers' first Super Bowl appearance since Super Bowl XXXVII. They made history by becoming the first team to host the Super Bowl in their own stadium. The Buccaneers had led the all-time series between the two clubs at 7–6, and also hold a 3–1 edge in games played at Raymond James Stadium. The Buccaneers were the designated home team, due to being the NFC representative this season, but elected to wear their road white uniforms rather than home red uniforms.

Tampa Bay received the opening kickoff and returned it to their own 23-yard line but were unable to gain a 1st down and were forced to punt. Kansas City proceeded to move the ball near midfield but after an incompletion were forced to punt as well. Tampa Bay proceeded to stall on their ensuing drive following a sack by Frank Clark, and on Kansas City's next drive they were able to move the ball into Tampa Bay's territory. However, following an incompletion from Patrick Mahomes to Tyreek Hill on 3rd and long the Chiefs were forced to settle for a 49-yard field goal by Harrison Butker to score the first points of the game and gain a 3–0 lead; this would be Kansas City's only lead of the game. On Tampa Bay's ensuing drive the Buccaneers took the ball 70 yards on 8 plays, culminating in an 8-yard touchdown pass from Tom Brady to Rob Gronkowski. Following a successful PAT the Buccaneers would end the 1st quarter up 7–3.

During Tampa Bay's 1st possession of the 2nd quarter they were able to move the ball into Kansas City's red zone following a 31-yard pass completion from Brady to Mike Evans to set up 1st and goal; however, despite 4 attempts for a score, the Kansas City defense was able to force a turnover on downs on 4th down after preventing Ronald Jones II from reaching the goal line. After stalling out in their next possession a holding penalty against Kansas City canceled out a 56-yard punt which would have set up the Buccaneers to start at their own 30-yard line, and on the ensuing retry Tommy Townsend shanked the punt, sending it only 29 yards which resulted in Tampa Bay being able to start at the Kansas City 38-yard line. On the following drive critical penalties extended Tampa Bay's possession, a holding penalty on Charvarius Ward negated what would have been an interception by Tyrann Mathieu and an offside penalty during a field goal attempt provided Tampa Bay with a new set on downs. On the following play Brady once again found Gronkowski in the end zone for a 17-yard touchdown, which after a successful PAT gave Tampa a 14–3 lead. During Kansas City's next drive multiple long completions from Mahomes to Travis Kelce helped bring the Chiefs into Tampa Bay's red zone for the first time in the game, but they were forced to settle for a 34-yard field goal by Butker to bring the score to 14–6. During Tampa Bay's next drive multiple penalties on Kansas City's defense moved the Buccaneers deep into the Chiefs' territory, most notably a defensive pass interference penalty by Bashaud Breeland resulting in a gain of 34 yards and a defensive pass interference on Mathieu in the end zone which gave the Buccaneers 1st and goal at the 1-yard line. Brady would then find Antonio Brown for a 1-yard touchdown pass, which after a successful PAT gave Tampa Bay a 21–6 lead at halftime.

Kansas City received the ball to begin the 3rd quarter, and following long runs by Clyde Edwards-Helaire and a completion from Mahomes to Kelce the Chiefs were able to move into Tampa Bay's territory once again. However, they were forced to settle for a 52-yard field goal by Butker to bring the score to 21–9. On Tampa Bay's ensuing drive the Buccaneers were able to bring the ball into Chiefs' territory following a 25-yard completion from Brady to Gronkowski, and on the next play Leonard Fournette scored a 27-yard touchdown run, which after a successful PAT gave the Buccaneers a 28–9 lead. On the Chiefs' next drive a deflection by Mike Edwards led to an interception by Antoine Winfield Jr. to give the Buccaneers' offense starting field position at the Kansas City 45-yard line. During this drive, a botched snap on 3rd down forced the Buccaneers to settle for a 52-yard field goal by Ryan Succop to extend their lead to 31–9. On Kansas City's following drive long completions from Mahomes to Hill, Kelce, and Sammy Watkins were able to take the Chiefs deep into Tampa Bay territory but the Chiefs were unable to score following an incompletion by Mahomes to Darrel Williams on 4th down which resulted in a turnover on downs.

In the 4th quarter the Buccaneers were ultimately forced to punt at midfield, and on the Chiefs' ensuing drive long completions from Mahomes to Kelce and Hill as well as a roughing the passer penalty on Ndamukong Suh were able to once again bring them deep into Tampa Bay territory, however Tampa Bay's defense was able to hold and force another turnover on downs on 4th down. Following a punt on a quickly stalled drive by the Buccaneers, the Chiefs were again able to move into the Buccaneers' territory following long completions from Mahomes to Kelce, Edwards-Helaire, and Demarcus Robinson but once again Tampa Bay's defense held firm and forced another takeaway as Devin White intercepted the ball at the goal line. Brady and the Buccaneers would then kneel the ball on the following drive to end the game and give the Tampa Bay Buccaneers their 2nd Super Bowl title in franchise history.

Brady completed 21 of 29 passes for 201 yards and 3 touchdowns, as he extended his own record for Super Bowl victories with his 7th as well as his own record for Super Bowl MVP awards with his 5th. As a result of this win Brady would tie Otto Graham for the most championships by a player in the history of professional football with his 7th, as well as join Peyton Manning as the only QBs to win a Super Bowl with 2 different franchises. Brady also became the first professional athlete in any of the 4 major American sports to win a championship with 2 different teams after turning 40, as well as the first player in NFL history to defeat 3 former Super Bowl MVPs in the same postseason (Mahomes, Drew Brees, and Aaron Rodgers) and the first player in NFL history to win a championship in 3 different decades. Gronkowski would be his top target for the game, as he recorded 6 catches for 67 yards and 2 touchdowns. With Gronkowski's 2nd touchdown reception he and Brady broke the record for the most touchdowns from a QB to a pass catcher in postseason history with their 14th together, the record previously being held by Joe Montana and Jerry Rice with 13. Fournette would finish with 16 carries for 89 yards and a touchdown to go along with 4 receptions for 46 yards while Jones would add an additional 61 yards on 12 carries as well. Fournette would also join Terrell Davis and Larry Fitzgerald as the only players in NFL history to score 1+ scrimmage TDs in 4 games of a single postseason. White would finish with a team leading 12 tackles as well as 1 pass deflection and 1 interception, Winfield Jr. would also record an interception to go along with 6 tackles and 2 pass deflections. Suh would finish with a team leading 1.5 sacks while Shaquil Barrett would also gain 1 sack and Cam Gill would record half of a sack. Ryan Succop would make all 5 of his kicks in the game. Mahomes completed 26 of 49 passes for 270 yards, no touchdowns, and 2 interceptions. This would be the first time since becoming a starter that an offense led by Mahomes would not be able to score a touchdown in a game as well as the first time Mahomes has lost a game by double digit points since college. Kelce would be his top target with 10 receptions for 133 yards. Edwards-Helaire would be their top rusher with 9 carries for 64 yards as well as having 2 receptions for 23 yards. Damien Wilson would be their top tackler with 10 total tackles, and Clark would have 4 tackles and 1 sack. Butker made all 3 of his kicks in the game.

== Awards ==
- NFC Offensive Player of the Week
  - Week 4: Tom Brady
- NFC Defensive Player of the Week
  - Week 3: Shaquil Barrett
  - Week 7: Devin White
  - Week 15: Devin White
- NFC Special Teams Player of the Week
  - Week 8: Ryan Succop
  - Week 17: Ryan Succop
- NFC Offensive Player of the Month (October): Tom Brady
- NFC Defensive Player of the Month (September): Lavonte David
- Defensive Rookie of the Month (September): Antoine Winfield Jr.
- FedEx Air Player of the Week
  - Week 4: Tom Brady
  - Week 17: Tom Brady
- FedEx Ground Player of the Week
  - Week 10: Ronald Jones II
- Super Bowl MVP: Tom Brady
