= Ronald Jones II =

American football player (born 1997)

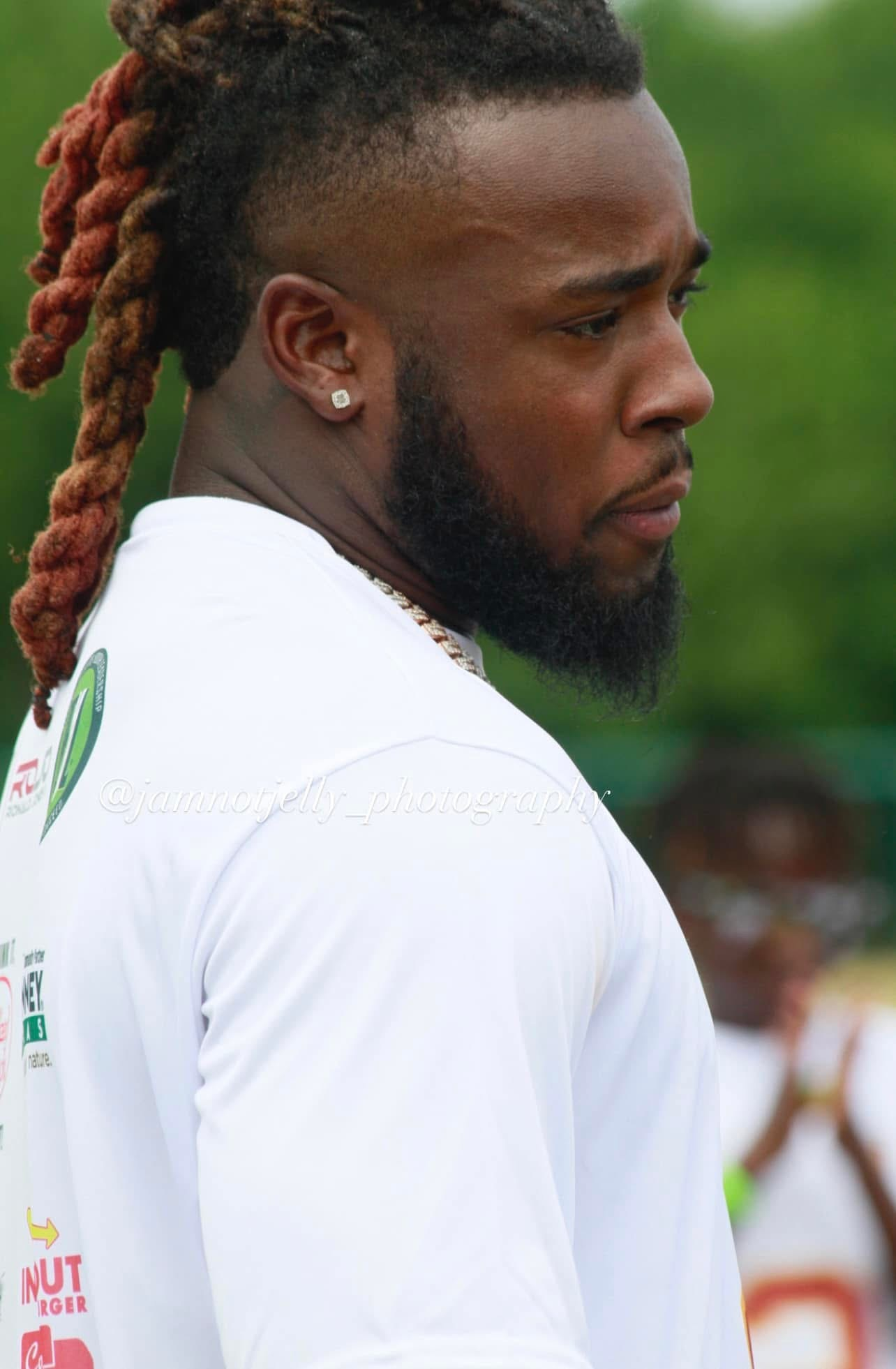
- Jones with the Tampa Bay Buccaneers in 2019

No. 27, 2
- Position: Running back

Personal information
- Born: August 3, 1997 (age 29); Fort Stewart, Georgia, U.S.
- Listed height: 5 ft 11 in (1.80 m)
- Listed weight: 208 lb (94 kg)

Career information
- High school: McKinney North (McKinney, Texas)
- College: USC (2015–2017)
- NFL draft: 2018: 2nd round, 38th overall pick

Career history
- Tampa Bay Buccaneers (2018–2021); Kansas City Chiefs (2022); Dallas Cowboys (2023)

Awards and highlights
- 2× Super Bowl champion (LV, LVII); First-team All-Pac-12 (2017); Second-team All-Pac-12 (2016)

Career NFL statistics
- Rushing yards: 2,244
- Rushing average: 4.4
- Rushing touchdowns: 19
- Receptions: 77
- Receiving yards: 593
- Receiving touchdowns: 1
- Stats at Pro Football Reference

Ronald Jones II (born August 3, 1997) is an American former professional football player who was a running back in the National Football League (NFL). He played college football for the USC Trojans, where he finished his college career with over 3,600 rushing yards over three seasons before being selected by the Tampa Bay Buccaneers in the second round of the 2018 NFL draft.

== Early life ==
Jones attended McKinney North High School in McKinney, Texas, where he ran track and played football. Jones also played tailback for the Bulldogs high school football team. He was rated by Rivals.com as a four-star recruit and in 2015 was ranked as the fourth best running back and 40th best player overall. Jones committed to the University of Southern California (USC) to play college football.

== College career ==
Jones played college football at USC under head coaches Steve Sarkisian and Clay Helton.

As a freshman in 2015, Jones recorded 153 carries for 987 yards and eight touchdowns to go along with seven receptions for 39 yards and a touchdown in 14 games and no starts.

As a sophomore in 2016, Jones recorded 177 carries for 1,082 yards and 12 touchdowns to go along with 11 receptions for 76 yards and a touchdown in 13 games and six starts.

As a junior in 2017, Jones recorded 261 carries for 1,550 yards and 19 touchdowns to go along with 14 receptions for 187 yards and a touchdown in 13 games and starts. After his junior year, Jones decided to forgo his senior year and enter the 2018 NFL draft.

Jones holds the title of all time 5th leading rusher at USC. He broke a 30 year old record of Charles White also rushing more yards than O. J. Simpson, Lendale White and Reggie Bush.

== Professional career ==
Pre-draft measurables
Height	Weight	Arm length	Hand span	40-yard dash	10-yard split	Vertical jump
5 ft 11 in (1.80 m)	205 lb (93 kg)	31 1/8 in (0.79 m)	8 3/4 in (0.22 m)	4.65 s	1.59 s	36.5 in (0.93 m)
All values from NFL Combine

=== Tampa Bay Buccaneers ===
==== 2018 season ====
Jones was selected by the Tampa Bay Buccaneers in the second round with the 38th overall pick in the 2018 NFL draft. He was the fifth running back to be selected that year.

Jones made his NFL debut in Week 4 against the Chicago Bears. In the 48–10 road loss, Jones recorded ten carries for 29 yards. Three weeks later against the Cleveland Browns, he had six carries for 13 yards and his first NFL touchdown to go along with a 15-yard reception as the Buccaneers won in overtime by a score of 26–23.

Jones finished his rookie season with 23 carries for 44 yards and a touchdown to go along with seven receptions for 33 yards in nine games and no starts.

==== 2019 season ====
During the season-opening 31–17 loss to the San Francisco 49ers, Jones had 13 carries for 75 yards to go along with an 18-yard reception. Two weeks later against the New York Giants, he earned his first NFL start and had 14 carries for 80 yards to go along with a 41-yard reception in the narrow 32–31 loss. In the next game against the Los Angeles Rams, Jones had 19 carries for 70 yards and his first touchdown of the season to go along with a 12-yard reception in the 55–40 road victory. During a Week 6 37–26 loss to the Carolina Panthers in London, he rushed for 10 yards and a touchdown.

Midway through the season, Jones became the Buccaneers' starting running back. During a Week 9 40–34 overtime road loss to the Seattle Seahawks, his first game as a starter, Jones had 18 carries for 67 yards and a touchdown to go along with two receptions for 15 yards. In the next game against the Arizona Cardinals, he had 11 carries for 29 yards and a touchdown and caught a season-high eight passes for 77 yards in the narrow 30–27 victory. Two weeks later against the Atlanta Falcons, Jones had 12 carries for 51 yards and a touchdown to go along with three receptions for 16 yards in the 35–22 road victory. During a Week 16 23–20 loss to the Houston Texans, he had 14 carries for 77 yards and a touchdown to go along with three receptions for 32 yards. In the regular-season finale against the Falcons, Jones had 11 carries for 106 yards and caught two passes for 10 yards in the 28–22 overtime loss.

Jones finished his second professional season with 172 carries for 724 yards and six touchdowns to go along with 31 receptions for 309 yards in 16 games and nine starts.

==== 2020 season ====
Jones began the 2020 season as the Buccaneers' starting running back. During a Week 2 31–17 victory over the Panthers, he recorded seven carries for 23 yards and his first touchdown of the season. Two weeks later against the Los Angeles Chargers, Jones had 20 carries for 111 yards as the Buccaneers won by a score of 38–31. In the next game against the Bears, he recorded 17 carries for 106 yards and three receptions for 19 yards as the Buccaneers narrowly lost on the road by a score of 20–19. The following week against the Green Bay Packers, he had 23 carries for 113 yards and two touchdowns in the 38–10 victory. During a Week 7 45–20 road victory over the Las Vegas Raiders, Jones recorded 13 carries for 34 yards and a touchdown.

During a Week 10 46–23 road victory over the Panthers, Jones lost a fumble to begin the game, but later countered with a 98-yard touchdown. The 98-yard run was the longest play in franchise history. He finished the game with 23 carries for 192 yards and the aforementioned touchdown to go along with a six-yard reception. Two weeks later against the Kansas City Chiefs, Jones had nine carries for 66 yards to go along with a 37-yard touchdown reception in the 27–24 loss.

Jones was placed on the reserve/COVID-19 list by the Buccaneers on December 16, 2020, which caused him to lose his starting position to Leonard Fournette. Jones was activated on December 29, 2020. During the regular-season finale against the Falcons, Jones recorded 12 carries for 78 yards and a touchdown as the Buccaneers won by a score of 44–27.

Jones finished the 2020 season as the Buccaneers' leading rusher with 192 carries for 978 yards and seven touchdowns to go along with 28 receptions for 165 yards and a touchdown in 14 games and 13 starts. The Buccaneers finished second in the National Football Conference (NFC) South with an 11–5 record and qualified for the playoffs. In the playoffs, Jones split time with Fournette in the backfield. In the Divisional Round against the New Orleans Saints, Jones had 13 carries for 62 yards in the 30–20 road victory. In the NFC Championship Game against the Packers, he recorded 10 carries for 16 yards as the Buccaneers won on the road by a score of 31–26. During Super Bowl LV against the Chiefs, Jones had 12 carries for 61 yards in the 31–9 victory.

==== 2021 season ====
In the 2021 season, Jones saw a lessened role with Leonard Fournette getting more rushing opportunities. During a narrow Week 4 19–17 road victory over the New England Patriots, Jones had six carries for 25 yards and his first touchdown of the season. During a Week 11 30–10 victory over the New York Giants, he rushed eight times for 33 yards and a touchdown. In the next game against the Indianapolis Colts, Jones had seven carries for 37 yards and a touchdown in the 38–31 road victory. During a Week 16 32–6 road victory over the Panthers, Jones had 20 carries for 65 yards and a touchdown. In the next game against the New York Jets, he had 10 carries for 26 yards and caught a one-yard reception before leaving the eventual 28–24 comeback road victory with an ankle injury.

Jones finished the 2021 season with 101 carries for 428 yards and four touchdowns to go along with 10 receptions for 64 yards in 16 games and three starts. Although the Buccaneers finished atop the NFC South with a 13–4 record, Jones' injury caused him to miss both playoff games.

=== Kansas City Chiefs ===
Jones signed with the Chiefs on March 27, 2022. On October 29, Jones announced that he wanted the Chiefs to release him, after finding himself buried in the depth chart behind Clyde Edwards-Helaire, Jerick McKinnon, and Isiah Pacheco. He finished the season with 17 carries for 70 yards to go along with a 22-yard reception in six games and no starts. Jones earned another Super Bowl ring when the Chiefs defeated the Philadelphia Eagles by a score of 38–35 to win Super Bowl LVII.

=== Dallas Cowboys ===
On March 21, 2023, Jones signed with the Dallas Cowboys, to provide depth at running back after the release of previous starter Ezekiel Elliott. He was suspended for the first two games of the regular season on July 31, 2023. Jones was released by the Cowboys after his suspension was completed on September 18.

== Career statistics ==
=== NFL ===
Legend
	Led the league
	Won the Super Bowl
**Bold**	Career high

==== Regular season ====
Year	Team	Games		Rushing					Receiving					Fumbles	
Year	Team	GP	GS	Att	Yds	Avg	Lng	TD	Rec	Yds	Avg	Lng	TD	Fum	Lost
2018	TB	9	0	23	44	1.9	9	1	7	33	4.7	15	0	0	0
2019	TB	**16**	9	172	724	4.2	49	6	**31**	**309**	10.0	**41**	0	**3**	**2**
2020	TB	14	**13**	**192**	**978**	**5.1**	**98T**	**7**	28	165	5.9	37T	**1**	2	**2**
2021	TB	**16**	3	101	428	4.2	30	4	10	64	6.4	15	0	2	**2**
2022	KC	6	0	17	70	4.1	13	1	1	22	**22.0**	22	0	0	0
Total		61	25	505	2,244	4.4	98T	19	77	593	7.7	41	1	7	6

==== Postseason ====
Year	Team	Games		Rushing					Receiving					Fumbles	
Year	Team	GP	GS	Att	Yds	Avg	Lng	TD	Rec	Yds	Avg	Lng	TD	Fum	Lost
2020	TB	**3**	0	**35**	**139**	**4.0**	**13**	0	0	0	0.0	0	0	0	0
2021	TB	0	0	Did not play due to injury											
2022	KC	1	0	1	0	0.0	0	0	0	0	0.0	0	0	0	0
Total		4	0	36	139	3.9	13	0	0	0	0.0	0	0	0	0

=== College ===
Season	Team	Games		Rushing				Receiving			
Season	Team	GP	GS	Att	Yds	Avg	TD	Rec	Yds	Avg	TD
2015	USC	14	0	153	987	6.5	8	7	39	5.6	1
2016	USC	13	6	177	1,082	6.1	12	9	73	8.1	1
2017	USC	13	13	261	1,550	5.9	19	14	187	13.3	1
Career		40	19	591	3,619	6.1	39	31	280	9.0	3
