= 2024 Tampa Bay Buccaneers season =

49th season in franchise history

- Owner: The Glazer family
- General manager: Jason Licht
- Head coach: Todd Bowles
- Offensive coordinator: Liam Coen
- Home stadium: Raymond James Stadium

Results
- Record: 10–7
- Division place: 1st NFC South
- Playoffs: Lost Wild Card Playoffs (vs. Commanders) 20–23
- All-Pros: LT Tristan Wirfs (1st team)
- Pro Bowlers: T Tristan Wirfs; DT Vita Vea; WR Mike Evans; QB Baker Mayfield

Uniform
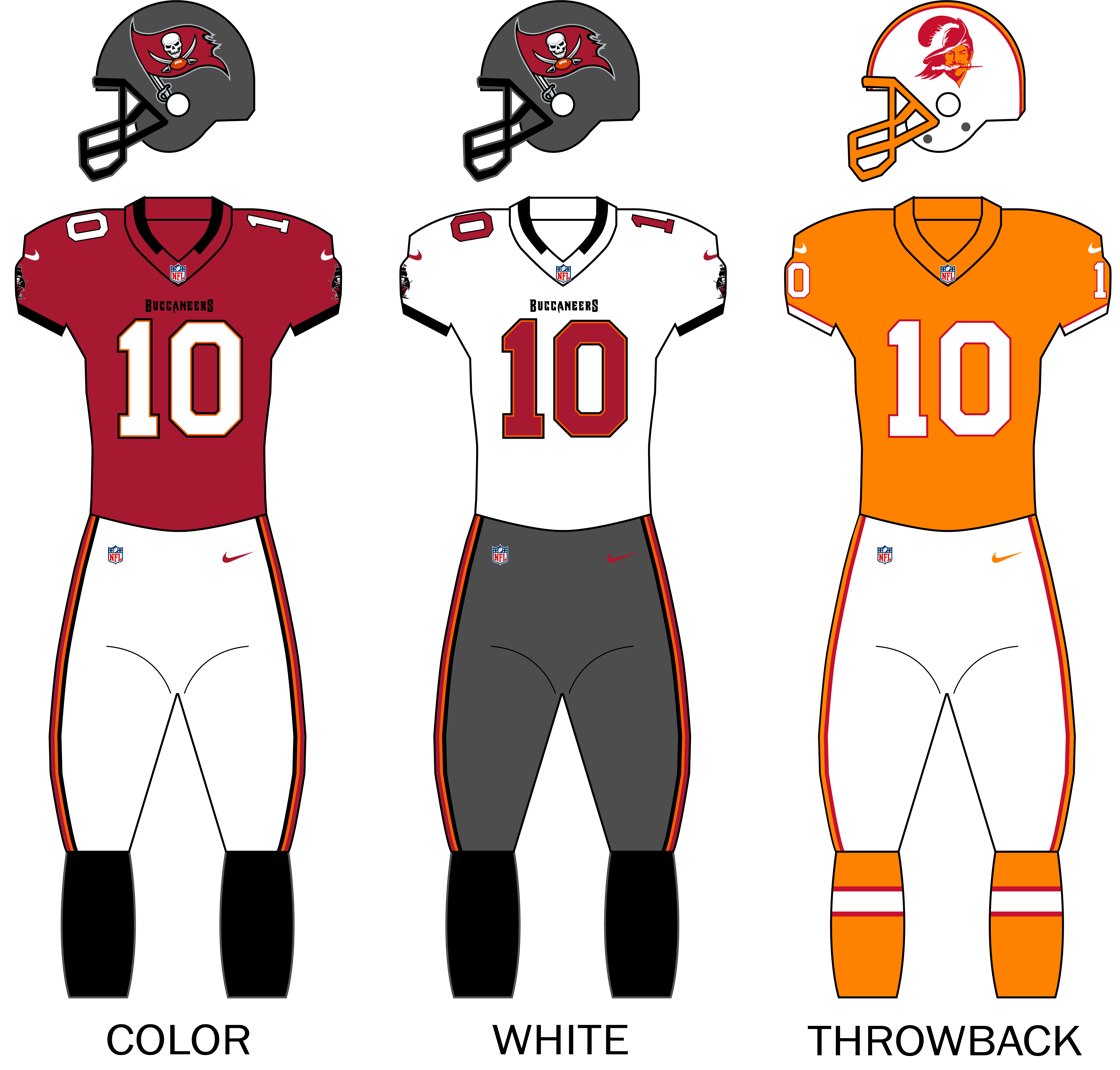

The 2024 season was the Tampa Bay Buccaneers' 49th in the National Football League (NFL), their eleventh under the leadership of general manager Jason Licht, their 27th playing their home games at Raymond James Stadium and their third under head coach Todd Bowles. They entered the season as the three-time defending NFC South champions. After winning the division and leading the team to the Divisional Round of the playoffs one year earlier, Baker Mayfield signed a three-year contract extension to continue as starting quarterback.

Much like their previous season, the Buccaneers started off the year 3–1, but saw a mid season slump, losing five of their next six games to slide to 4–6. This mid-season slump saw two overtime losses, a last-second loss to the 49ers, and a season sweep by division rival Atlanta Falcons. Wide receiver Chris Godwin was lost with a season-ending injury against Baltimore, and Mike Evans also missed playing time. But like the 2023 season, the Buccaneers had a late season rebound. They won six out of their final seven games to finish 10–7. Tampa Bay improved on their 9–8 record from 2023, and won the NFC South for a franchise-best fourth consecutive season and a record-tying seventh title following a victory against the New Orleans Saints in Week 18. They also qualified for the postseason for a team record fifth consecutive year. However, their resurgent season would come to an end when they were defeated at home by the Washington Commanders by a final score of 23–20, despite having defeated them in the season opener 37–20.

Despite missing three games due to a hamstring injury, wide receiver Mike Evans finished the regular season with 1,004 receiving yards. Evans tied the NFL record held by Jerry Rice for most consecutive seasons with 1,000+ receiving yards (11), as well as extended his own active record for most such seasons consecutively from the start of a player's career. Evans tied the record in somewhat dramatic fashion. Inside the two-minute warning of the final game of the regular season, Evans was a mere 5 yards short of the milestone. Tampa Bay unexpectedly got the ball back with 36 seconds remaining. Evans caught a 9-yard pass on the final play of regulation to lift him over the 1,000-yard mark.

== Season summary ==
The 2024 Tampa Bay Buccaneers offense ranked near the top of the NFL in most categories, and set some new franchise records. They became the first team in NFL history to have an overall pass completion percentage of 70% and average 5+ yards per carry in rushing. In his second season as starting quarterback, Baker Mayfield threw 41 touchdown passes, second-best in team history behind only Tom Brady in 2021 (43). Mayfield ranked third overall in the league in total passing yards (4,500), tied for second in touchdown passes (41), and tied for second in pass completions (407). For quarterbacks who played in all 17 regular season games, he ranked second in completion percentage (71.4%), and fourth in passer rating (106.8). He also had 378 rushing yards and three rushing touchdowns. Mayfield's completion percentage and passer rating were franchise records. Mayfield became the tenth different quarterback in NFL history to throw for 4,500+ yards and throw 40+ touchdowns in a single season.

The Buccaneers offense ranked third overall in the league in total yards (6,792), third in passing yards (4,257), fourth in rushing yards (2,536), and fourth in total points scored (502). The season was highlighted by wide receiver Mike Evans tying the NFL record held by Jerry Rice for most consecutive seasons with 1,000+ receiving yards (11), as well as extending his own current NFL record for most such seasons consecutively from the start of a career. Running back Bucky Irving became the first Tampa Bay rookie to rush for 1,000+ yards since Doug Martin in 2012. Irving ranked 10th overall in the league with 1,122 yards, the best among rookies, and also had 8 rushing touchdowns. The total team rushing yards was a franchise record, breaking the one held by the Ricky Bell-led 1979 team. The Buccaneers were the best in the league in Third Down conversions (50.9%), and ranked 4th in red zone offense with a 65.7% touchdown rate.

In Week 4, they snapped a then league-worst 23-game streak without an opening drive touchdown, and went on to score touchdowns on the opening drives of eight games. Tampa Bay outscored their opponents by a margin of 502–385, falling just short of the team record of 511 total points scored. A strong second-half team throughout the season, Tampa Bay outscored their opponents 247–135 in the second half of games, and 152–70 in the fourth quarter alone. In three overtime games, however (tied for the most in a single season in franchise history), they were only 1–2.

The Tampa Bay defense however, was only average, ranking 18th in the league giving up 341.8 yards/game and 16th in points allowed per game (22.6). The defense managed only 7 interceptions and 18 total takeaways, resulting in a season turnover margin of -5.

== Draft ==
2024 Tampa Bay Buccaneers draft selections
Round	Selection	Player	Position	College	Notes
1	26	Graham Barton	C	Duke	
2	57	Chris Braswell	OLB	Alabama	
3	89	Tykee Smith	S	Georgia	
3	92	Jalen McMillan	WR	Washington	From Detroit (Note: The Buccaneers traded a sixth-round selection (201st overall), a 2025 sixth-round selection and CB Carlton Davis to the Detroit Lions in exchange for a third-round selection (92nd overall).)
4	125	Bucky Irving	RB	Oregon	
5	161	Traded to the Philadelphia Eagles (Note: The Buccaneers traded a fifth-round selection (161st overall) to the Philadelphia Eagles in exchange for a 2023 sixth-round selection (191st overall).)			
6	201	Traded to the Detroit Lions			
6	220	Elijah Klein	G	UTEP	Compensatory selection
7	246	Devin Culp	TE	Washington	

2024 Tampa Bay Buccaneers undrafted free agents
Name	Position	College	Ref.
Zack Annexstad	QB	Illinois State	
Marcus Banks	S	Mississippi State	
Judge Culpepper	DT	Toledo	
Xavier Delgado	G	Missouri	
Kalen DeLoach	LB	Florida State	
Tyrek Funderburk	CB	Appalachian State	
Antonio Grier	LB	Arkansas	
Daniel Grzesiak	OLB	Cincinnati	
Kameron Johnson	WR	Barton	
Avery Jones	G	Auburn	
Latreal Jones	WR	Southern Miss	
Tanner Knue	WR	Eastern Michigan	
Chris McDonald	CB	Toledo	
Shaun Peterson	OLB	UCF	
D. J. Williams	RB	Arizona	
Rashad Wisdom	S	UTSA	
Andrew Hayes	CB	Central Arkansas	
Ramon Jefferson	RB	Kentucky	

Draft trades

== Staff ==
2024 Tampa Bay Buccaneers staff
Front office: Co-owner/president – Darcie Glazer Kassewitz; Co-owner/co-chairman – Bryan Glazer; Co-owner/co-chairman – Edward Glazer; Co-owner/co-chairman – Joel Glazer; Co-owner – Avram Glazer; Co-owner – Kevin Glazer; General manager – Jason Licht; Assistant general manager – John Spytek; Director of football operations – Shelton Quarles; Assistant general manager – Mike Greenberg; Director of player personnel – Mike Biehl; Director of player personnel – Rob McCartney; Senior personnel executive – Byron Kiefer; Vice president of player engagement – Duke Preston; Vice president of football research – Jacqueline Davidson; Senior advisor to the general manager – Bruce Arians; Director of pro scouting – Shane Scannell; Assistant director of pro scouting – Sean Conley; Assistant director of pro scouting – Donovan Cotton; Assistant director of college scouting – Tony Hardie; Head coaches: Head coach – Todd Bowles; Offensive coaches: Offensive coordinator – Liam Coen; Pass game coordinator – Josh Grizzard; Pass game assistant – John Van Dam; Quarterbacks – Thad Lewis; Assistant quarterbacks – Jordan Somerville; Running backs – Skip Peete; Wide receivers – Bryan McClendon; Tight ends – Justin Peelle; Offensive line – Kevin Carberry; Assistant offensive line – Brian Picucci; Offensive quality control – Jeff Kastl	Defensive coaches: Run game coordinator/defensive line – Kacy Rodgers; Outside linebackers – George Edwards; Pass game coordinator/inside linebackers – Larry Foote; Cornerbacks – Kevin Ross; Safeties – Nick Rapone; Assistant secondary – Tim Atkins; Defensive assistant – Mike Chiurco; Defensive assistant – Rashad Johnson; Defensive quality control – Joey Fitzgerald; Special teams coaches: Special teams coordinator – Thomas McGaughey; Defensive/special teams assistant – Keith Tandy; Strength and conditioning: Head strength and conditioning – Anthony Piroli; Assistant strength and conditioning – Cory Bichey; Assistant strength and conditioning – Chad Wade; Assistant strength and conditioning – DeAndre Ward; Director of rehabilitation and performance – Maral Javadifar

== Final roster ==
2024 Tampa Bay Buccaneers roster
Quarterbacks (QB): 6 Baker Mayfield; 2 Kyle Trask; Running backs (RB): 7 Bucky Irving; 44 Sean Tucker; 1 Rachaad White; Wide receivers (WR): 13 Mike Evans; 18 Rakim Jarrett; 19 Kameron Johnson; 15 Jalen McMillan; 81 Ryan Miller; 10 Trey Palmer; 17 Sterling Shepard; Tight ends (TE): 82 Devin Culp; 87 Payne Durham; 41 Ko Kieft; 88 Cade Otton	Offensive linemen (OL): 62 Graham Barton C; 68 Ben Bredeson LG; 67 Luke Goedeke RT; 70 Robert Hainsey C; 79 Elijah Klein RG; 69 Cody Mauch RG; 64 Royce Newman LG; 77 Justin Skule LT; 78 Tristan Wirfs LT; Defensive linemen (DL): 95 C. J. Brewer DE; 96 Greg Gaines NT; 92 William Gholston DE; 90 Logan Hall DE; 94 Calijah Kancey DE; 50 Vita Vea NT	Linebackers (LB): 56 Shaquil Barrett OLB; 43 Chris Braswell OLB; 52 K. J. Britt ILB; 54 Lavonte David ILB; 0 YaYa Diaby OLB; 98 Anthony Nelson OLB; 33 Jose Ramirez OLB; 51 J. J. Russell ILB; 9 Joe Tryon-Shoyinka OLB; Defensive backs (DB): 35 Jamel Dean CB; 21 Mike Edwards S; 24 Tyrek Funderburk CB; 32 Josh Hayes CB; 27 Zyon McCollum CB; 26 Kaevon Merriweather S; 36 Ryan Neal S; 23 Tykee Smith SS; 37 Tavierre Thomas CB; 31 Antoine Winfield Jr. FS; Special teams (ST): 5 Jack Browning P; 86 Evan Deckers LS; 4 Chase McLaughlin K	Practice squad: 39 Marcus Banks SS; 85 Marquez Callaway WR; 28 Dallis Flowers CB; 97 Adam Gotsis DT; 91 Mike Greene DE; 74 Garret Greenfield RT; 48 Antonio Grier ILB; 57 Daniel Grzesiak OLB (PS/I); 72 Luke Haggard RT; 89 Dennis Houston WR; 45 Deion Jones MLB; 80 Tanner Knue WR; 71 Lorenz Metz LT (IPP); 75 Raiqwon O'Neal RT; 11 Michael Pratt QB; 84 Tanner Taula TE; 83 Cody Thompson WR (PS/I); 30 D. J. Williams RB; 38 Rashad Wisdom FS; Reserve: 93 Eric Banks DE (IR); 8 SirVocea Dennis ILB (IR); 61 Silas Dzansi LT (IR); 22 Chase Edmonds RB (IR); 14 Chris Godwin WR (IR); 34 Bryce Hall CB (IR); 25 Troy Hill CB (IR); 29 Christian Izien SS (IR); 76 Sua Opeta G (IR); 58 Markees Watts OLB (IR); 3 Jordan Whitehead SS (NF-Inj.); Rookies in italics 53 active, 11 reserve, 16 practice squad (3 exempt)

== Preseason ==
Week	Date	Opponent	Result	Record	Venue	Recap
1	August 10	at Cincinnati Bengals	W 17–14	1–0	Paycor Stadium	Recap
2	August 17	at Jacksonville Jaguars	L 7–20	1–1	EverBank Stadium	Recap
3	August 23	Miami Dolphins	W 24–14	2–1	Raymond James Stadium	Recap

== Regular season ==
=== Schedule ===
Week	Date	Opponent	Result	Record	Venue	Recap
1	September 8	Washington Commanders	**W** 37–20	1–0	Raymond James Stadium	Recap
2	September 15	at Detroit Lions	**W** 20–16	2–0	Ford Field	Recap
3	September 22	Denver Broncos	**L** 7–26	2–1	Raymond James Stadium	Recap
4	September 29	Philadelphia Eagles	**W** 33–16	3–1	Raymond James Stadium	Recap
5	October 3	at **Atlanta Falcons**	**L** 30–36 (OT)	3–2	Mercedes-Benz Stadium	Recap
6	October 13	at **New Orleans Saints**	**W** 51–27	4–2	Caesars Superdome	Recap
7	October 21	Baltimore Ravens	**L** 31–41	4–3	Raymond James Stadium	Recap
8	October 27	**Atlanta Falcons**	**L** 26–31	4–4	Raymond James Stadium	Recap
9	November 4	at Kansas City Chiefs	**L** 24–30 (OT)	4–5	Arrowhead Stadium	Recap
10	November 10	San Francisco 49ers	**L** 20–23	4–6	Raymond James Stadium	Recap
11	Bye					
12	November 24	at New York Giants	**W** 30–7	5–6	MetLife Stadium	Recap
13	December 1	at **Carolina Panthers**	**W** 26–23 (OT)	6–6	Bank of America Stadium	Recap
14	December 8	Las Vegas Raiders	**W** 28–13	7–6	Raymond James Stadium	Recap
15	December 15	at Los Angeles Chargers	**W** 40–17	8–6	SoFi Stadium	Recap
16	December 22	at Dallas Cowboys	**L** 24–26	8–7	AT&T Stadium	Recap
17	December 29	**Carolina Panthers**	**W** 48–14	9–7	Raymond James Stadium	Recap
18	January 5	**New Orleans Saints**	**W** 27–19	10–7	Raymond James Stadium	Recap

Note: Intra-division opponents are in bold text.

=== Game summaries ===
==== Week 1: vs. Washington Commanders ====
Week 1: Washington Commanders at Tampa Bay Buccaneers – Game summary

Quarter	1	2	3	4	Total
Commanders	0	7	7	6	**20**
**Buccaneers**	6	10	7	14	**37**

at Raymond James Stadium, Tampa, Florida

- Date: September 8
- Game time: 4:25 p.m. EDT
- Game weather: Cloudy, 93 °F (34 °C)
- Game attendance: 63,020
- Referee: Bill Vinovich
- TV announcers (Fox): Kevin Kugler, Daryl Johnston and Laura Okmin
- Recap, Game Book

Game information

**First quarter**

- TB – Chase McLaughlin 56-yard field goal, 11:34. Buccaneers 3–0. **Drive: 7 plays, 32 yards, 3:26.**
- TB – Chase McLaughlin 34-yard field goal, 5:08. Buccaneers 6–0. **Drive: 9 plays, 46 yards, 4:22.**

**Second quarter**

- TB – Mike Evans 17-yard pass from Baker Mayfield (Chase McLaughlin kick), 10:53. Buccaneers 13–0. **Drive: 8 plays, 63 yards, 4:23.**
- WAS – Brian Robinson Jr. 7-yard run (Cade York kick), 7:17. Buccaneers 13–7. **Drive: 8 plays, 74 yards, 3:36.**
- TB – Chase McLaughlin 29-yard field goal, 0:16. Buccaneers 16–7. **Drive: 13 plays, 49 yards, 7:01.**

**Third quarter**

- TB – Chris Godwin 4-yard pass from Baker Mayfield (Chase McLaughlin kick), 7:11. Buccaneers 23–7. **Drive: 5 plays, 54 yards, 2:10.**
- WAS – Jayden Daniels 1-yard run (Cade York kick), 1:52. Buccaneers 23–14. **Drive: 6 plays, 60 yards, 2:56.**

**Fourth quarter**

- TB – Jalen McMillan 32-yard pass from Baker Mayfield (Chase McLaughlin kick), 14:55. Buccaneers 30–14. **Drive: 5 plays, 72 yards, 1:57.**
- TB – Mike Evans 1-yard pass from Baker Mayfield (Chase McLaughlin kick), 3:29. Buccaneers 37–14. **Drive: 12 plays, 91 yards, 7:38.**
- WAS – Jayden Daniels 1-yard run (pass failed), 1:12. Buccaneers 37–20. **Drive: 10 plays, 70 yards, 2:17.**

**Top passers**

- WAS – Jayden Daniels – 17/24, 184 yards
- TB – Baker Mayfield – 24/30, 289 yards, 4 TD

**Top rushers**

- WAS – Jayden Daniels – 16 rushes, 88 yards, 2 TD
- TB – Bucky Irving – 9 rushes, 62 yards

**Top receivers**

- WAS – Austin Ekeler – 4 receptions, 52 yards
- TB – Chris Godwin – 8 receptions, 83 yards, TD

Baker Mayfield threw for 289 yards and four touchdown passes as Tampa Bay defeated Washington 37–20. The Buccaneers won on opening day for the fourth consecutive season, the longest such streak in franchise history. Mike Evans caught two of the touchdown passes, while rookie Jalen McMillan caught his first touchdown in his first career NFL game. Washington rookie quarterback Jayden Daniels led all rushers on the day with 88 yards and two touchdowns, but the Buccaneers defense for the most part stymied the Commanders offense throughout the game.

==== Week 2: at Detroit Lions ====
Week 2: Tampa Bay Buccaneers at Detroit Lions – Game summary

Quarter	1	2	3	4	Total
**Buccaneers**	6	7	7	0	**20**
Lions	3	3	10	0	**16**

at Ford Field, Detroit, Michigan

- Date: September 15
- Game time: 1:00 p.m. EDT
- Game weather: None (indoor stadium)
- Game attendance: 64,160
- Referee: Clay Martin
- TV announcers (Fox): Kevin Kugler, Daryl Johnston and Laura Okmin
- Recap, Game Book

Game information

**First quarter**

- TB – Chase McLaughlin 30-yard field goal, 11:31. Buccaneers 3–0. **Drive: 7 plays, 58 yards, 3:29.**
- TB – Chase McLaughlin 55-yard field goal, 9:00. Buccaneers 6–0. **Drive: 4 plays, 7 yards, 2:20.**
- DET – Jake Bates 22-yard field goal, 7:13. Buccaneers 6–3. **Drive: 5 plays, 67 yards, 1:47.**

**Second quarter**

- DET – Jake Bates 35-yard field goal, 12:47. Tied 6–6. **Drive: 13 plays, 67 yards, 6:49.**
- TB – Chris Godwin 41-yard pass from Baker Mayfield (Chase McLaughlin kick), 9:08. Buccaneers 13–6. **Drive: 6 plays, 70 yards, 3:39.**

**Third quarter**

- DET – Jake Bates 32-yard field goal, 12:40. Buccaneers 13–9. **Drive: 6 plays, 57 yards, 3:07.**
- DET – David Montgomery 1-yard run (Jake Bates kick), 3:26. Lions 16–13. **Drive: 12 plays, 68 yards, 6:07.**
- TB – Baker Mayfield 11-yard run (Chase McLaughlin kick), 0:34. Buccaneers 20–16. **Drive: 6 plays, 70 yards, 2:52.**

**Fourth quarter**

- No scoring plays.

**Top passers**

- TB – Baker Mayfield – 12/19, 185 yards, TD, INT
- DET – Jared Goff – 34/55, 307 yards, 2 INT

**Top rushers**

- TB – Baker Mayfield – 5 rushes, 34 yards, TD
- DET – Jahmyr Gibbs – 13 rushes, 84 yards

**Top receivers**

- TB – Chris Godwin – 7 receptions, 117 yards, TD
- DET – Amon-Ra St. Brown – 11 receptions, 119 yards

Tampa Bay visited Detroit in a rematch of the previous season's Divisional round playoff game. Quarterback Baker Mayfield threw a 41-yard touchdown pass to Chris Godwin in the first half. Mayfield then scored on an 11-yard designed quarterback run in the third quarter. The Buccaneers defeated the Lions 20–16, and started the season 2–0 for the fourth consecutive season.

Aidan Hutchinson compiled 4 1/2 sacks for the Lions, and Mayfield threw one interception. But miscues by the Lions ruined their chances to win. With less than 10 seconds left and counting in the first half, the Lions were trying to spike the ball to set up a field goal attempt. However, the kicking unit had come out onto the field prematurely, and the Lions were penalized for too many men on the field. The drive came up empty. During the fourth quarter, Detroit was in Tampa Bay territory three times, but all three drives failed to produce any points.

==== Week 3: vs. Denver Broncos ====
Week 3: Denver Broncos at Tampa Bay Buccaneers – Game summary

Quarter	1	2	3	4	Total
**Broncos**	14	6	0	6	**26**
Buccaneers	0	7	0	0	**7**

at Raymond James Stadium, Tampa, Florida

- Date: September 22
- Game time: 1:00 p.m. EDT
- Game weather: Cloudy, 87 °F (31 °C)
- Game attendance: 62,738
- Referee: Alan Eck
- TV announcers (Fox): Tim Brando, Matt Millen and Sarah Kustok
- Recap, Game Book

Game information

**First quarter**

- DEN – Bo Nix 3-yard run (Wil Lutz kick), 11:05. Broncos 7–0. **Drive: 6 plays, 70 yards, 3:55.**
- DEN – Jaleel McLaughlin 1-yard run (Wil Lutz kick), 2:56. Broncos 14–0. **Drive: 4 plays, 9 yards, 2:14.**

**Second quarter**

- DEN – Wil Lutz 43-yard field goal, 9:25. Broncos 17–0. **Drive: 13 plays, 41 yards, 6:52.**
- TB – Chris Godwin 5-yard pass from Baker Mayfield (Chase McLaughlin kick), 1:50. Broncos 17–7. **Drive: 6 plays, 67 yards, 2:45.**
- DEN – Wil Lutz 38-yard field goal, 0:02. Broncos 20–7. **Drive: 9 plays, 50 yards, 1:48.**

**Third quarter**

- No scoring plays.

**Fourth quarter**

- DEN – Wil Lutz 33-yard field goal, 14:52. Broncos 23–7. **Drive: 15 plays, 79 yards, 7:57.**
- DEN – Wil Lutz 43-yard field goal, 7:30. Broncos 26–7. **Drive: 5 plays, 50 yards, 2:22.**

**Top passers**

- DEN – Bo Nix – 25/36, 216 yards
- TB – Baker Mayfield – 25/33, 163 yards, TD, INT

**Top rushers**

- DEN – Tyler Badie – 9 rushes, 70 yards
- TB – Bucky Irving – 9 rushes, 70 yards

**Top receivers**

- DEN – Courtland Sutton – 7 receptions, 68 yards
- TB – Chris Godwin – 6 receptions, 53 yards, TD

Denver jumped out to a 17–0 lead in the first half, and defeated Tampa Bay 26–7. The Buccaneers offense turned the ball over twice, and turned the ball over on down two more times.

==== Week 4: vs. Philadelphia Eagles ====
Week 4: Philadelphia Eagles at Tampa Bay Buccaneers – Game summary

Quarter	1	2	3	4	Total
Eagles	0	7	9	0	**16**
**Buccaneers**	14	10	6	3	**33**

at Raymond James Stadium, Tampa, Florida

- Date: September 29
- Game time: 1:00 p.m. EDT
- Game weather: Cloudy, 88 °F (31 °C)
- Game attendance: 64,233
- Referee: Carl Cheffers
- TV announcers (Fox): Kevin Burkhardt, Tom Brady, Erin Andrews and Tom Rinaldi
- Recap, Game Book

Game information

**First quarter**

- TB – Mike Evans 2-yard pass from Baker Mayfield (Chase McLaughlin kick), 9:44. Buccaneers 7–0. **Drive: 10 plays, 79 yards, 5:16.**
- TB – Trey Palmer 15-yard pass from Baker Mayfield (Chase McLaughlin kick), 5:03. Buccaneers 14–0. **Drive: 5 plays, 80 yards, 2:46.**

**Second quarter**

- TB – Baker Mayfield 1-yard run (Chase McLaughlin kick), 14:09. Buccaneers 21–0. **Drive: 5 plays, 22 yards, 1:57.**
- TB – Chase McLaughlin 21-yard field goal, 7:18. Buccaneers 24–0. **Drive: 12 plays, 77 yards, 6:29.**
- PHI – Parris Campbell 1-yard pass from Jalen Hurts (Jake Elliott kick), 1:54. Buccaneers 24–7. **Drive: 14 plays, 70 yards, 5:24.**

**Third quarter**

- PHI – Jalen Hurts 1-yard run (Jake Elliott kick), 12:28. Buccaneers 24–14. **Drive: 5 plays, 70 yards, 2:32.**
- TB – Bucky Irving 1-yard run (kick blocked), 6:49. Buccaneers 30–14. **Drive: 12 plays, 70 yards, 5:39.**
- PHI – Kelee Ringo defensive two-point conversion, 6:49. Buccaneers 30–16.

**Fourth quarter**

- TB – Chase McLaughlin 52-yard field goal, 12:59. Buccaneers 33–16. **Drive: 9 plays, 42 yards, 4:37.**

**Top passers**

- PHI – Jalen Hurts – 18/30, 158 yards, TD
- TB – Baker Mayfield – 30/47, 347 yards, 2 TD

**Top rushers**

- PHI – Saquon Barkley – 10 rushes, 84 yards
- TB – Bucky Irving – 10 rushes, 49 yards, TD

**Top receivers**

- PHI – Dallas Goedert – 7 receptions, 62 yards
- TB – Mike Evans – 8 receptions, 94 yards, TD

Quarterback Baker Mayfield threw two touchdown passes, and ran for another touchdown, as Tampa Bay soundly defeated Philadelphia in a rematch of the previous season's Wild Card matchup. Mike Evans caught a 2-yard touchdown pass on the opening drive, and became the all-time scoring leader in franchise history. The Buccaneers built a 24–0 lead midway though the second quarter, then took a 24–7 lead into halftime. The Tampa Bay defense forced two turnovers, and sacked Jalen Hurts six times.

This was Tom Brady's first visit back to Tampa Bay, this time as a commentator. Brady played the final 3 seasons of his career with the Buccaneers, as their quarterback from 2020 to 2022.

==== Week 5: at Atlanta Falcons ====
Week 5: Tampa Bay Buccaneers at Atlanta Falcons – Game summary

Quarter	1	2	3	4	OT	Total
Buccaneers	10	14	3	3	0	**30**
**Falcons**	7	10	3	10	6	**36**

at Mercedes-Benz Stadium, Atlanta, Georgia

- Date: October 3
- Game time: 8:15 p.m. EDT
- Game weather: None (retractable roof closed)
- Game attendance: 70,016
- Referee: Ronald Torbert
- TV announcers (WTVT, WAGA, Prime Video): Al Michaels, Kirk Herbstreit and Kaylee Hartung
  Game exclusive to WTVT and WAGA through syndication. Out of market on Prime Video.
- Recap, Game Book

Game information

**First quarter**

- ATL – Drake London 18-yard pass from Kirk Cousins (Younghoe Koo kick), 11:54. Falcons 7–0. **Drive: 7 plays, 70 yards, 3:06.**
- TB – Mike Evans 2-yard pass from Baker Mayfield (Chase McLaughlin kick), 7:36. Tied 7–7. **Drive: 9 plays, 63 yards, 4:18.**
- TB – Chase McLaughlin 53-yard field goal, 1:22. Buccaneers 10–7. **Drive: 6 plays, 34 yards, 2:08.**

**Second quarter**

- ATL – Darnell Mooney 24-yard pass from Kirk Cousins (Younghoe Koo kick), 11:58. Falcons 14–10. **Drive: 9 plays, 70 yards, 4:24.**
- TB – Mike Evans 23-yard pass from Baker Mayfield (Chase McLaughlin kick), 10:17. Buccaneers 17–14. **Drive: 3 plays, 44 yards, 1:41.**
- ATL – Younghoe Koo 54-yard field goal, 6:17. Tied 17–17. **Drive: 8 plays, 34 yards, 4:00.**
- TB – Sterling Shepard 4-yard pass from Baker Mayfield (Chase McLaughlin kick), 1:56. Buccaneers 24–17. **Drive: 7 plays, 82 yards, 4:21.**

**Third quarter**

- ATL – Younghoe Koo 48-yard field goal, 6:21. Buccaneers 24–20. **Drive: 12 plays, 50 yards, 5:49.**
- TB – Chase McLaughlin 32-yard field goal, 1:17. Buccaneers 27–20. **Drive: 9 plays, 56 yards, 5:04.**

**Fourth quarter**

- ATL – Darnell Mooney 12-yard pass from Kirk Cousins (Younghoe Koo kick), 13:18. Tied 27–27. **Drive: 8 plays, 70 yards, 2:59.**
- TB – Chase McLaughlin 53-yard field goal, 10:23. Buccaneers 30–27. **Drive: 6 plays, 35 yards, 2:55.**
- ATL – Younghoe Koo 52-yard field goal, 0:02. Tied 30–30. **Drive: 9 plays, 46 yards, 1:14.**

**Overtime**

- ATL – KhaDarel Hodge 45-yard pass from Kirk Cousins, 8:45. Falcons 36–30. **Drive: 4 plays, 70 yards, 1:15.**

**Top passers**

- TB – Baker Mayfield – 19/24, 180 yards, 3 TD
- ATL – Kirk Cousins – 42/58, 509 yards, 4 TD, INT

**Top rushers**

- TB – Rachaad White – 10 rushes, 72 yards
- ATL – Bijan Robinson – 12 rushes, 61 yards

**Top receivers**

- TB – Chris Godwin – 5 receptions, 64 yards
- ATL – Drake London – 12 receptions, 154 yards, TD

Tampa Bay faced Atlanta in an offensive shootout on Thursday Night Football. Kirk Cousins threw for 509 yards, but the Buccaneers still clung to a 30–27 lead at the two-minute warning. Lavonte David intercepted Cousins with 1:44 left in regulation. However, the Atlanta defense forced a three-and-out, and got the ball back with 1:14 left on the clock. Younghoe Koo kicked a 52-yard field goal as time expired to send the game to overtime. The Buccaneers defense failed to stop the Falcons on the opening drive of overtime, and Cousins found KhaDarel Hodge for a 45-yard touchdown on the fourth play, winning the game for Atlanta, 36–30.

==== Week 6: at New Orleans Saints ====
Week 6: Tampa Bay Buccaneers at New Orleans Saints – Game summary

Quarter	1	2	3	4	Total
**Buccaneers**	17	7	7	20	**51**
Saints	0	27	0	0	**27**

at Caesars Superdome, New Orleans, Louisiana

- Date: October 13
- Game time: 1:00 p.m. EDT/12:00 p.m. CDT
- Game weather: None (indoor stadium)
- Game attendance: 70,041
- Referee: Clete Blakeman
- TV announcers (Fox): Adam Amin, Greg Olsen and Pam Oliver
- Recap, Game Book

Game information

**First quarter**

- TB – Chris Godwin 4-yard pass from Baker Mayfield (Chase McLaughlin kick), 10:05. Buccaneers 7–0. **Drive: 8 plays, 74 yards, 4:55.**
- TB – Antoine Winfield Jr. 58-yard fumble return (Chase McLaughlin kick), 8:54. Buccaneers 14–0. **Drive: 3 plays, 27 yards, 1:23.**
- TB – Chase McLaughlin 26-yard field goal, 4:01. Buccaneers 17–0. **Drive: 8 plays, 71 yards, 3:56.**

**Second quarter**

- NO – Blake Grupe 42-yard field goal, 13:43. Buccaneers 17–3. **Drive: 11 plays, 56 yards, 5:18.**
- NO – Rashid Shaheed 54-yard punt return (Blake Grupe kick), 13:04. Buccaneers 17–10. **Drive: 3 plays, −17 yards, 0:39.**
- NO – Blake Grupe 29-yard field goal, 9:00. Buccaneers 17–13. **Drive: 6 plays, 17 yards, 3:24.**
- NO – Bub Means 10-yard pass from Spencer Rattler (Blake Grupe kick), 8:37. Saints 20–17. **Drive: 1 play, 10 yards, 0:04.**
- TB – Sean Tucker 36-yard pass from Baker Mayfield (Chase McLaughlin kick), 5:39. Buccaneers 24–20. **Drive: 6 plays, 76 yards, 2:58.**
- NO – Alvin Kamara 4-yard run (Blake Grupe kick), 2:47. Saints 27–24. **Drive: 7 plays, 70 yards, 2:52.**

**Third quarter**

- TB – Chris Godwin 55-yard pass from Baker Mayfield (Chase McLaughlin kick), 4:25. Buccaneers 31–27. **Drive: 7 plays, 92 yards, 4:13.**

**Fourth quarter**

- TB – Cade Otton 8-yard pass from Baker Mayfield (pass failed), 12:34. Buccaneers 37–27. **Drive: 5 plays, 58 yards, 2:21.**
- TB – Bucky Irving 1-yard run (Chase McLaughlin kick), 5:33. Buccaneers 44–27. **Drive: 10 plays, 71 yards, 6:03.**
- TB – Sean Tucker 5-yard run (Chase McLaughlin kick), 1:55. Buccaneers 51–27. **Drive: 6 plays, 64 yards, 2:24.**

**Top passers**

- TB – Baker Mayfield – 24/36, 325 yards, 4 TD, 3 INT
- NO – Spencer Rattler – 22/40, 243 yards, TD, 2 INT

**Top rushers**

- TB – Sean Tucker – 14 rushes, 136 yards, TD
- NO – Alvin Kamara – 13 rushes, 40 yards, TD

**Top receivers**

- TB – Chris Godwin – 11 receptions, 125 yards, TD
- NO – Foster Moreau – 2 receptions, 54 yards

Tampa Bay faced rival New Orleans, just three days after Hurricane Milton made landfall just south of the Tampa Bay area. The team evacuated their headquarters in Tampa on Tuesday, and spent most of the week in New Orleans. They practiced at Tulane in preparations for the game. With Saints quarterback Derek Carr out with an oblique injury, rookie Spencer Rattler made his first career NFL start for New Orleans.

The Buccaneers jumped out to a 17–0 lead in the first quarter. However, the Saints stormed into the lead scoring 20 unanswered points. After three interceptions and a punt return touchdown, the Saints took a 27–24 lead into halftime. After the wild first half, Tampa Bay took over the game in the second half. The Buccaneers pulled away for a 51–27 victory, shutting out the Saints in the second half. Rattler was intercepted twice, and Baker Mayfield rebounded to finish with 325 yards and 4 touchdown passes.

Tampa Bay racked up a franchise record 594 net offensive yards, and their 51 points was the second-highest total in team history. The Buccaneers became the fifth team in NFL history to achieve 300+ yards passing and 275+ yards rushing in the same game. After the game, the players dedicated their performance to "everyone back home" recovering from the storm.

==== Week 7: vs. Baltimore Ravens ====
Week 7: Baltimore Ravens at Tampa Bay Buccaneers – Game summary

Quarter	1	2	3	4	Total
**Ravens**	0	17	17	7	**41**
Buccaneers	10	0	0	21	**31**

at Raymond James Stadium, Tampa, Florida

- Date: October 21
- Game time: 8:15 p.m. EDT
- Game weather: Cloudy, 80 °F (27 °C)
- Game attendance: 64,828
- Referee: Alex Kemp
- TV announcers (ESPN/ABC): Joe Buck, Troy Aikman and Laura Rutledge
- Recap, Game Book

Game information

**First quarter**

- TB – Mike Evans 25-yard pass from Baker Mayfield (Chase McLaughlin kick), 10:27. Buccaneers 7–0. **Drive: 8 plays, 70 yards, 4:33.**
- TB – Chase McLaughlin 23-yard field goal, 0:02. Buccaneers 10–0. **Drive: 11 plays, 75 yards, 6:03.**

**Second quarter**

- BAL – Mark Andrews 9-yard pass from Lamar Jackson (Justin Tucker kick), 12:29. Buccaneers 10–7. **Drive: 6 plays, 70 yards, 2:33.**
- BAL – Justice Hill 18-yard pass from Lamar Jackson (Justin Tucker kick), 4:23. Ravens 14–10. **Drive: 4 plays, 80 yards, 1:47.**
- BAL – Justin Tucker 28-yard field goal, 0:04. Ravens 17–10. **Drive: 10 plays, 50 yards, 2:54.**

**Third quarter**

- BAL – Justin Tucker 52-yard field goal, 12:20. Ravens 20–10. **Drive: 5 plays, 24 yards, 2:40.**
- BAL – Rashod Bateman 49-yard pass from Lamar Jackson (Justin Tucker kick), 7:25. Ravens 27–10. **Drive: 4 plays, 55 yards, 0:57.**
- BAL – Mark Andrews 4-yard pass from Lamar Jackson (Justin Tucker kick), 2:53. Ravens 34–10. **Drive: 5 plays, 92 yards, 2:05.**

**Fourth quarter**

- TB – Rachaad White 11-yard pass from Baker Mayfield (Baker Mayfield–Sterling Shepard pass), 11:24. Ravens 34–18. **Drive: 5 plays, 30 yards, 2:08.**
- BAL – Derrick Henry 13-yard pass from Lamar Jackson (Justin Tucker kick), 6:32. Ravens 41–18. **Drive: 8 plays, 70 yards, 4:52.**
- TB – Bucky Irving 1-yard run (pass failed), 3:39. Ravens 41–24. **Drive: 9 plays, 70 yards, 2:46.**
- TB – Rachaad White 23-yard pass from Baker Mayfield (Chase McLaughlin kick), 1:58. Ravens 41–31. **Drive: 7 plays, 52 yards, 1:48.**

**Top passers**

- BAL – Lamar Jackson – 17/22, 281 yards, 5 TD
- TB – Baker Mayfield – 31/45, 370 yards, 3 TD, 2 INT

**Top rushers**

- BAL – Derrick Henry – 15 rushes, 169 yards
- TB – Rachaad White – 10 rushes, 40 yards

**Top receivers**

- BAL – Rashod Bateman – 4 receptions, 121 yards, TD
- TB – Cade Otton – 8 receptions, 100 yards

Returning home to Tampa for the first time since Hurricane Milton's landfall, the Buccaneers played the Baltimore Ravens. On the opening drive, Mike Evans caught a 25-yard touchdown pass from Baker Mayfield. As a result, Evans became the 11th player in NFL history with 100 career touchdown receptions. Evans, however, left the game early in the second quarter with a hamstring injury. Ravens quarterback Lamar Jackson threw five touchdown passes, as the Ravens defeated the Buccaneers 41–31. Down by 10 points in the final minute, wide receiver Chris Godwin was lost for the season, after suffering a dislocated ankle.

==== Week 8: vs. Atlanta Falcons ====
Week 8: Atlanta Falcons at Tampa Bay Buccaneers – Game summary

Quarter	1	2	3	4	Total
**Falcons**	7	17	7	0	**31**
Buccaneers	7	10	0	9	**26**

at Raymond James Stadium, Tampa, Florida

- Date: October 27
- Game time: 1:00 p.m. EDT
- Game weather: Cloudy, 79 °F (26 °C)
- Game attendance: 62,787
- Referee: Shawn Hochuli
- TV announcers (Fox): Adam Amin, Greg Olsen and Pam Oliver
- Recap, Game Book

Game information

**First quarter**

- ATL – Kyle Pitts 36-yard pass from Kirk Cousins (Younghoe Koo kick), 12:52. Falcons 7–0. **Drive: 4 plays, 43 yards, 1:19.**
- TB – Cade Otton 5-yard pass from Baker Mayfield (Chase McLaughlin kick), 4:22. Tied 7–7. **Drive: 15 plays, 70 yards, 8:30.**

**Second quarter**

- TB – Rachaad White 18-yard pass from Baker Mayfield (Chase McLaughlin kick), 10:28. Buccaneers 14–7. **Drive: 12 plays, 97 yards, 7:09.**
- ATL – Kyle Pitts 49-yard pass from Kirk Cousins (Younghoe Koo kick), 7:19. Tied 14–14. **Drive: 7 plays, 70 yards, 3:09.**
- ATL – Darnell Mooney 30-yard pass from Kirk Cousins (Younghoe Koo kick), 2:09. Falcons 21–14. **Drive: 6 plays, 61 yards, 3:19.**
- TB – Chase McLaughlin 52-yard field goal, 1:04. Falcons 21–17. **Drive: 7 plays, 36 yards, 1:05.**
- ATL – Younghoe Koo 39-yard field goal, 0:01. Falcons 24–17. **Drive: 8 plays, 49 yards, 1:03.**

**Third quarter**

- ATL – Bijan Robinson 6-yard pass from Kirk Cousins (Younghoe Koo kick), 0:14. Falcons 31–17. **Drive: 6 plays, 36 yards, 2:51.**

**Fourth quarter**

- TB – Kirk Cousins fumble out of bounds in end zone for safety, 12:04. Falcons 31–19.
- TB – Cade Otton 4-yard pass from Baker Mayfield (Chase McLaughlin kick), 6:52. Falcons 31–26. **Drive: 12 plays, 73 yards, 5:12.**

**Top passers**

- ATL – Kirk Cousins – 23/29, 276 yards, 4 TD
- TB – Baker Mayfield – 37/50, 330 yards, 3 TD, 2 INT

**Top rushers**

- ATL – Bijan Robinson – 13 rushes, 63 yards
- TB – Bucky Irving – 9 rushes, 44 yards

**Top receivers**

- ATL – Bijan Robinson – 6 receptions, 37 yards, TD
- TB – Cade Otton – 9 receptions, 81 yards, 2 TD

Quarterback Baker Mayfield threw two interceptions, and a fumble on the opening drive by Rachaad White cost Tampa Bay dearly, as they fell to Atlanta 31–26. The Falcons swept the season series, and took over sole possession of first place in the NFC South. With 6 seconds left in regulation, Mayfield's Hail Mary pass to the endzone was caught by Rakim Jarrett – but out of bounds – as time expired.

==== Week 9: at Kansas City Chiefs ====
Week 9: Tampa Bay Buccaneers at Kansas City Chiefs – Game summary

Quarter	1	2	3	4	OT	Total
Buccaneers	0	7	10	7	0	**24**
**Chiefs**	3	7	0	14	6	**30**

at Arrowhead Stadium, Kansas City, Missouri

- Date: November 4
- Game time: 8:15 p.m. EST/7:15 p.m. CST
- Game weather: 63 °F (17 °C)
- Game attendance: 73,574
- Referee: John Hussey
- TV announcers (ESPN/ABC): Joe Buck, Troy Aikman, Lisa Salters, and Laura Rutledge
- Recap, Game Book

Game information

**First quarter**

- KC – Harrison Butker 40-yard field goal, 2:16. Chiefs 3–0. **Drive: 8 plays, 33 yards, 4:34.**

**Second quarter**

- TB – Rachaad White 7-yard run (Chase McLaughlin kick), 10:23. Buccaneers 7–3. **Drive: 11 plays, 70 yards, 6:53.**
- KC – DeAndre Hopkins 1-yard pass from Patrick Mahomes (Harrison Butker kick), 4:05. Chiefs 10–7. **Drive: 11 plays, 70 yards, 6:18.**

**Third quarter**

- TB – Cade Otton 11-yard pass from Baker Mayfield (Chase McLaughlin kick), 11:36. Buccaneers 14–10. **Drive: 6 plays, 51 yards, 3:24.**
- TB – Chase McLaughlin 47-yard field goal, 5:50. Buccaneers 17–10. **Drive: 8 plays, 30 yards, 4:41.**

**Fourth quarter**

- KC – Samaje Perine 7-yard pass from Patrick Mahomes (Harrison Butker kick), 14:14. Tied 17–17. **Drive: 12 plays, 70 yards, 6:36.**
- KC – DeAndre Hopkins 5-yard pass from Patrick Mahomes (Harrison Butker kick), 4:17. Chiefs 24–17. **Drive: 15 plays, 78 yards, 8:26.**
- TB – Ryan Miller 1-yard pass from Baker Mayfield (Chase McLaughlin kick), 0:27. Tied 24–24. **Drive: 10 plays, 71 yards, 1:49.**

**Overtime**

- KC – Kareem Hunt 2-yard run, 4:08. Chiefs 30–24. **Drive: 10 plays, 70 yards, 5:52.**

**Top passers**

- TB – Baker Mayfield – 23/31, 200 yards, 2 TD
- KC – Patrick Mahomes – 34/44, 291 yards, 3 TD

**Top rushers**

- TB – Bucky Irving – 7 rushes, 24 yards
- KC – Kareem Hunt – 27 rushes, 106 yards, TD

**Top receivers**

- TB – Cade Otton – 8 receptions, 77 yards, TD
- KC – Travis Kelce – 14 receptions, 100 yards

In a rematch of Super Bowl LV, Tampa Bay faced Kansas City on Monday Night Football. Quarterback Baker Mayfield found Ryan Miller for a 1-yard touchdown pass with 27 seconds left in regulation to tie the game at 24–24. The game went to overtime, and Kansas City won with a touchdown on their first possession.

==== Week 10: vs. San Francisco 49ers ====
Week 10: San Francisco 49ers at Tampa Bay Buccaneers – Game summary

Quarter	1	2	3	4	Total
**49ers**	7	3	3	10	**23**
Buccaneers	0	3	7	10	**20**

at Raymond James Stadium, Tampa, Florida

- Date: November 10
- Game time: 1:00 p.m. EST
- Game weather: Cloudy, 85 °F (29 °C)
- Game attendance: 64,914
- Referee: Shawn Smith
- TV announcers (Fox): Kevin Burkhardt, Tom Brady, Erin Andrews and Tom Rinaldi
- Recap, Game Book

Game information

**First quarter**

- SF – Ricky Pearsall 46-yard pass from Brock Purdy (Jake Moody kick), 4:15. 49ers 7–0. **Drive: 6 plays, 71 yards, 3:51.**

**Second quarter**

- SF – Jake Moody 28-yard field goal, 8:53. 49ers 10–0. **Drive: 14 plays, 77 yards, 8:14.**
- TB – Chase McLaughlin 30-yard field goal, 1:14. 49ers 10–3. **Drive: 13 plays, 58 yards, 7:39.**

**Third quarter**

- TB – Rachaad White 9-yard pass from Baker Mayfield (Chase McLaughlin kick), 11:58. Tied 10–10. **Drive: 4 plays, 21 yards, 1:57.**
- SF – Jake Moody 33-yard field goal, 4:21. 49ers 13–10. **Drive: 13 plays, 55 yards, 7:37.**

Fourth quarter'

- TB – Bucky Irving 12-yard run (Chase McLaughlin kick), 14:18. Buccaneers 17–13. **Drive: 14 plays, 70 yards, 5:03.**
- SF – George Kittle 11-yard pass from Brock Purdy (Jake Moody kick), 7:02. 49ers 20–17. **Drive: 6 plays, 64 yards, 3:15.**
- TB – Chase McLaughlin 26-yard field goal, 0:41. Tied 20–20. **Drive: 11 plays, 58 yards, 2:28.**
- SF – Jake Moody 44-yard field goal, 0:00. 49ers 23–20. **Drive: 6 plays, 39 yards, 0:41.**

**Top passers**

- SF – Brock Purdy – 25/36, 253 yards, 2 TD
- TB – Baker Mayfield – 18/29, 116 yards, TD

**Top rushers**

- SF – Christian McCaffrey – 13 rushes, 39 yards
- TB – Bucky Irving – 13 rushes, 73 yards, TD

**Top receivers**

- SF – Jauan Jennings – 7 receptions, 93 yards
- TB – Rachaad White – 6 receptions, 39 yards, TD

Quarterback Baker Mayfield was held to just 116 yards passing, however, he drove the Buccaneers to a game-tying field goal with 41 seconds remaining in regulation. With the score tied 20–20, 49ers kicker Jake Moody – who had missed three field goals on the day – kicked a 44-yard field goal as time expired. San Francisco won 23–20, and Tampa Bay lost their fourth straight.

==== Week 12: at New York Giants ====
Week 12: Tampa Bay Buccaneers at New York Giants – Game summary

Quarter	1	2	3	4	Total
**Buccaneers**	7	16	7	0	**30**
Giants	0	0	0	7	**7**

at MetLife Stadium, East Rutherford, New Jersey

- Date: November 24
- Game time: 1:00 p.m. EST
- Game weather: Mostly cloudy, 50 °F (10 °C)
- Game attendance: 77,554
- Referee: Adrian Hill
- TV announcers (CBS): Andrew Catalon, Tiki Barber, Jason McCourty and A. J. Ross
- Recap, Game Book

Game information

**First quarter**

- TB – Sean Tucker 1-yard run (Chase McLaughlin kick), 6:37. Buccaneers 7–0. **Drive: 14 plays, 70 yards, 8:23.**

**Second quarter**

- TB – Chase McLaughlin 23-yard field goal, 12:03. Buccaneers 10–0. **Drive: 6 plays, 33 yards, 2:58.**
- TB – Bucky Irving 6-yard run (Chase McLaughlin kick), 6:23. Buccaneers 17–0. **Drive: 7 plays, 82 yards, 3:41.**
- TB – Baker Mayfield 10-yard run (kick failed, wide left), 0:12. Buccaneers 23–0. **Drive: 9 plays, 86 yards, 2:45.**

**Third quarter**

- TB – Rachaad White 1-yard run (Chase McLaughlin kick), 3:45. Buccaneers 30–0. **Drive: 12 plays, 95 yards, 7:10.**

**Fourth quarter**

- NYG – Devin Singletary 1-yard run (Graham Gano kick), 11:28. Buccaneers 30–7. **Drive: 13 plays, 68 yards, 7:17.**

**Top passers**

- TB – Baker Mayfield – 24/30, 294 yards
- NYG – Tommy DeVito – 21/31, 189 yards

**Top rushers**

- TB – Bucky Irving – 12 rushes, 87 yards, TD
- NYG – Tyrone Tracy Jr. – 9 rushes, 42 yards

**Top receivers**

- TB – Mike Evans – 5 receptions, 68 yards
- NYG – Malik Nabers – 6 receptions, 64 yards

After their bye week, Tampa Bay traveled to the New York to take on the scuffling Giants. The Giants had released Daniel Jones during the week, and Tommy DeVito started for them at quarterback. The Buccaneers dominated the Giants, stretching out to a 30–0 lead after three quarters, and finished with a 30–7 victory. Baker Mayfield threw for 294 yards, and ran for a touchdown, as the Tampa Bay offense racked up 450 total yards. The Buccaneers defense sacked DeVito four times, forced one turnover (fumble), plus two turnovers on downs. The win snapped a four-game losing streak for Tampa Bay.

After missing three games with a hamstring injury, Mike Evans was back in the starting lineup. Evans caught 5 passes for 68 yards.

==== Week 13: at Carolina Panthers ====
Week 13: Tampa Bay Buccaneers at Carolina Panthers – Game summary

Quarter	1	2	3	4	OT	Total
**Buccaneers**	7	3	0	13	3	**26**
Panthers	3	10	3	7	0	**23**

at Bank of America Stadium, Charlotte, North Carolina

- Date: December 1
- Game time: 4:05 p.m. EST
- Game weather: Mostly sunny, 51 °F (11 °C)
- Game attendance: 69,214
- Referee: Tra Blake
- TV announcers (Fox): Chris Myers, Mark Schlereth and Jen Hale
- Recap, Game Book

Game information

**First quarter**

- TB – Mike Evans 2-yard pass from Baker Mayfield (Chase McLaughlin kick), 4:29. Buccaneers 7–0. **Drive: 12 plays, 63 yards, 6:06.**
- CAR – Eddy Piñeiro 47-yard field goal, 0:48. Buccaneers 7–3. **Drive: 7 plays, 41 yards, 3:41.**

**Second quarter**

- CAR – Bryce Young 10-yard run (Eddy Piñeiro kick), 7:45. Panthers 10–7. **Drive: 4 plays, 36 yards, 1:57.**
- TB – Chase McLaughlin 27-yard field goal, 3:39. Tied 10–10. **Drive: 9 plays, 61 yards, 4:06.**
- CAR – Eddy Piñeiro 27-yard field goal, 0:05. Panthers 13–10. **Drive: 9 plays, 49 yards, 0:38.**

**Third quarter**

- CAR – Eddy Piñeiro 22-yard field goal, 0:19. Panthers 16–10. **Drive: 7 plays, 16 yards, 3:49.**

**Fourth quarter**

- TB – Bucky Irving 6-yard run (Chase McLaughlin kick), 8:53. Buccaneers 17–16. **Drive: 11 plays, 69 yards, 6:26.**
- TB – Chase McLaughlin 26-yard field goal, 3:05. Buccaneers 20–16. **Drive: 9 plays, 67 yards, 4:13.**
- CAR – Adam Thielen 25-yard pass from Bryce Young (Eddy Piñeiro kick), 0:30. Panthers 23–20. **Drive: 9 plays, 60 yards, 2:35.**
- TB – Chase McLaughlin 51-yard field goal, 0:00. Tied 23–23. **Drive: 6 plays, 36 yards, 0:30.**

**Overtime**

- TB – Chase McLaughlin 30-yard field goal, 2:50. Buccaneers 26–23. **Drive: 5 plays, 59 yards, 2:13.**

**Top passers**

- TB – Baker Mayfield – 21/33, 235 yards, TD, 2 INT
- CAR – Bryce Young – 26/46, 298 yards, TD

**Top rushers**

- TB – Bucky Irving – 25 rushes, 152 yards, TD
- CAR – Chuba Hubbard – 12 rushes, 43 yards

**Top receivers**

- TB – Mike Evans – 8 receptions, 118 yards, TD
- CAR – Adam Thielen – 8 receptions, 99 yards, TD

With 30 seconds left in regulation, Bryce Young found Adam Thielen for a 25-yard touchdown pass, giving Carolina a 23–20 lead. Baker Mayfield then drove the Buccaneers to the Carolina 34-yard line with 3 seconds left. Chase McLaughlin kicked a 51-yard field goal as time expired to tie the score and send the game to overtime.

In the overtime period, Adam Thielen made a spectacular one-handed catch from Bryce Young, advancing the Panthers to the Tampa Bay 34-yard line. One play later, however, Chuba Hubbard was stripped of the ball by Anthony Nelson, and it was recovered by Buccaneers linebacker YaYa Diaby. Mayfield drove the Buccaneers down to the Carolina 12, and McLaughlin kicked a 30-yard field goal to win the game.

Coupled with an Atlanta loss against the Chargers, the Falcons and Buccaneers were now tied for the lead in the NFC South at 6–6. The Falcons remained ahead, however, based on the head-to-head tiebreaker.

==== Week 14: vs. Las Vegas Raiders ====
Week 14: Las Vegas Raiders at Tampa Bay Buccaneers – Game summary

Quarter	1	2	3	4	Total
Raiders	0	10	0	3	**13**
**Buccaneers**	14	0	0	14	**28**

at Raymond James Stadium, Tampa, Florida

- Date: December 8
- Game time: 1:00 p.m. EST
- Game weather: Cloudy, 71 °F (22 °C)
- Game attendance: 63,250
- Referee: Alan Eck
- TV announcers (CBS): Spero Dedes, Adam Archuleta and Aditi Kinkhabwala
- Recap, Game Book

Game information

**First quarter**

- TB – Jalen McMillan 15-yard pass from Baker Mayfield (Chase McLaughlin kick), 8:07. Buccaneers 7–0. **Drive: 12 plays, 85 yards, 6:53.**
- TB – Rachaad White 5-yard pass from Baker Mayfield (Chase McLaughlin kick), 3:52. Buccaneers 14–0. **Drive: 5 plays, 52 yards, 2:45.**

**Second quarter**

- LV – Aidan O'Connell 1-yard run (Daniel Carlson kick), 9:21. Buccaneers 14–7. **Drive: 6 plays, 45 yards, 2:42.**
- LV – Daniel Carlson 25-yard field goal, 4:28. Buccaneers 14–10. **Drive: 7 plays, 46 yards, 3:14.**

**Third quarter**

- No scoring plays.

**Fourth quarter**

- TB – Rachaad White 3-yard run (Chase McLaughlin kick), 8:47. Buccaneers 21–10. **Drive: 6 plays, 77 yards, 2:59.**
- LV – Daniel Carlson 27-yard field goal, 3:05. Buccaneers 21–13. **Drive: 11 plays, 57 yards, 5:42.**
- TB – Jalen McMillan 29-yard pass from Baker Mayfield (Chase McLaughlin kick), 1:56. Buccaneers 28–13. **Drive: 5 plays, 80 yards, 1:09.**

**Top passers**

- LV – Aidan O'Connell – 11/19, 104 yards, INT
- TB – Baker Mayfield – 18/29, 295 yards, 3 TD, 2 INT

**Top rushers**

- LV – Sincere McCormick – 15 rushes, 78 yards
- TB – Rachaad White – 17 rushes, 90 yards, TD

**Top receivers**

- LV – Michael Mayer – 7 receptions, 68 yards
- TB – Cade Otton – 3 receptions, 70 yards

After two consecutive wins following their bye week, the Buccaneers were tied with the Falcons atop the NFC South at 6–6, entering a home matchup against the 2–10 Raiders. Baker Mayfield threw two touchdown passes in the first quarter, one to Jalen McMillan and the next to Rachaad White, opening up a 14–0 lead. However, Mayfield struggled in the second quarter, turning over the ball three times (two interceptions and one lost fumble). The Raiders scored 10 unanswered points and threatened to take the lead at the start of the third period, when they put together an 18-play drive that took up over ten minutes, only to end in an Aidan O'Connell interception inside the red zone.

The Buccaneers clung to a 14–10 lead early in the fourth quarter. With 11:03 left in regulation, facing a 3rd and 9 at their own 24-yard line, Mayfield and Mike Evans connected for a big play. Evans hurdled one defender, and dragged another down to the Las Vegas 44 for a gain of 32 yards. That drive was capped off by a Rachaad White 3-yard touchdown run, giving Tampa Bay an 11-point lead. The Raiders made it a one-possession game again after a 27-yard field goal, but Mayfield wiped away any hope for a Raiders comeback when he found Jalen McMillan who high-stepped untouched into the end zone on the first play after the two-minute warning. Mayfield threw for 295 yards and three touchdowns and was picked twice. White had 17 carries for 90 yards and a score. With Atlanta's loss at Minnesota, the Buccaneers took sole possession of first place in the NFC South at 7–6, one game ahead of the Falcons.

==== Week 15: at Los Angeles Chargers ====
Week 15: Tampa Bay Buccaneers at Los Angeles Chargers – Game summary

Quarter	1	2	3	4	Total
**Buccaneers**	7	6	17	10	**40**
Chargers	7	10	0	0	**17**

at SoFi Stadium, Inglewood, California

- Date: December 15
- Game time: 4:25 p.m. EST/1:25 p.m. PST
- Game weather: Sunny, 66 °F (19 °C) (fixed roof)
- Game attendance: 69,496
- Referee: Scott Novak
- TV announcers (Fox): Adam Amin, Mark Sanchez and Kristina Pink
- Recap, Game Book

Game information

**First quarter**

- TB – Jalen McMillan 26-yard pass from Baker Mayfield (Chase McLaughlin kick), 11:14. Buccaneers 7–0. **Drive: 7 plays, 70 yards, 3:46.**
- LAC – Ladd McConkey 7-yard pass from Justin Herbert (Cameron Dicker kick), 6:18. Tied 7–7. **Drive: 10 plays, 70 yards, 4:56.**

**Second quarter**

- TB – Chase McLaughlin 22-yard field goal, 13:41. Buccaneers 10–7. **Drive: 12 plays, 67 yards, 7:37.**
- LAC – Cameron Dicker 41-yard field goal, 8:47. Tied 10–10. **Drive: 8 plays, 51 yards, 4:54.**
- LAC – Quentin Johnston 13-yard pass from Justin Herbert (Cameron Dicker kick), 7:12. Chargers 17–10. **Drive: 3 plays, 27 yards, 1:27.**
- TB – Chase McLaughlin 37-yard field goal, 0:33. Chargers 17–13. **Drive: 12 plays, 61 yards, 3:04.**

**Third quarter**

- TB – Mike Evans 57-yard pass from Baker Mayfield (Chase McLaughlin kick), 10:23. Buccaneers 20–17. **Drive: 5 plays, 83 yards, 2:54.**
- TB – Chase McLaughlin 42-yard field goal, 5:06. Buccaneers 23–17. **Drive: 5 plays, 46 yards, 2:47.**
- TB – Mike Evans 35-yard pass from Baker Mayfield (Chase McLaughlin kick), 1:36. Buccaneers 30–17. **Drive: 4 plays, 42 yards, 2:58.**

**Fourth quarter**

- TB – Rachaad White 11-yard pass from Baker Mayfield (Chase McLaughlin kick), 7:37. Buccaneers 37–17. **Drive: 9 plays, 66 yards, 6:01.**
- TB – Chase McLaughlin 43-yard field goal, 2:51. Buccaneers 40–17. **Drive: 9 plays, 30 yards, 3:20.**

**Top passers**

- TB – Baker Mayfield – 22/27, 288 yards, 4 TD, INT
- LAC – Justin Herbert – 21/33, 195 yards, 2 TD, INT

**Top rushers**

- TB – Bucky Irving – 15 rushes, 117 yards
- LAC – Gus Edwards – 8 rushes, 23 yards

**Top receivers**

- TB – Mike Evans – 9 receptions, 159 yards, 2 TD
- LAC – Ladd McConkey – 5 receptions, 58 yards, TD

Tampa Bay overcame two turnovers in the second quarter, and routed the Chargers by the score of 40–17 to win their fourth straight game. Baker Mayfield threw for 288 yards and four touchdown passes. Mike Evans had 9 receptions for a season-high 159 yards, leaving him just 251 yards shy of his eleventh consecutive season with 1,000+ receiving yards. Evans scored two touchdowns, including a 57-yard catch-and-run early in the third quarter, which put the Buccaneers ahead – a lead which they would not surrender.

Rookie running back Bucky Irving had 15 carries for 117 yards rushing, his second-highest single-game total of the season. His 54-yarder in the third quarter was his second-longest of the season, and he ended the day just 148 yards shy of a 1,000-yard rushing season. Irving, Rachaad White, Sean Tucker, along two Mayfield scrambles, combined for 223 yards on the ground.

The Tampa Bay defense sacked Justin Herbert three times and forced two turnovers, including one interception. It was Herbert's first interception since Week 2 (snapping a streak of 357 pass attempts without throwing a pick). After leading 17–10 midway through the second quarter, the Chargers were shut out in the second half. Tampa Bay scored 30 unanswered points and cruised to victory. They maintained their one-game lead over the Falcons for first place in the NFC South.

==== Week 16: at Dallas Cowboys ====
Week 16: Tampa Bay Buccaneers at Dallas Cowboys – Game summary

Quarter	1	2	3	4	Total
Buccaneers	0	14	3	7	**24**
**Cowboys**	10	13	3	0	**26**

at AT&T Stadium, Arlington, Texas

- Date: December 22
- Game time: 8:20 p.m. EST/7:20 p.m. CST
- Game weather: None (retractable roof closed)
- Game attendance: 93,103
- Referee: Land Clark
- TV announcers (NBC): Mike Tirico, Cris Collinsworth and Melissa Stark
- Recap, Game Book

Game information

**First quarter**

- DAL – Brandon Aubrey 58-yard field goal, 9:06. Cowboys 3–0. **Drive: 10 plays, 30 yards, 5:54.**
- DAL – Jalen Tolbert 10-yard pass from Cooper Rush (Brandon Aubrey kick), 2:49. Cowboys 10–0. **Drive: 5 plays, 52 yards, 2:08.**

**Second quarter**

- TB – Bucky Irving 2-yard run (Chase McLaughlin kick), 11:30. Cowboys 10–7. **Drive: 6 plays, 57 yards, 3:15.**
- DAL – Brandon Aubrey 49-yard field goal, 9:15. Cowboys 13–7. **Drive: 5 plays, 39 yards, 2:15.**
- DAL – Ezekiel Elliott 1-yard run (Brandon Aubrey kick), 1:45. Cowboys 20–7. **Drive: 9 plays, 80 yards, 2:29.**
- TB – Jalen McMillan 11-yard pass from Baker Mayfield (Chase McLaughlin kick), 0:48. Cowboys 20–14. **Drive: 7 plays, 71 yards, 0:57.**
- DAL – Brandon Aubrey 58-yard field goal, 0:00. Cowboys 23–14. **Drive: 6 plays, 30 yards, 0:48.**

**Third quarter**

- DAL – Brandon Aubrey 53-yard field goal, 6:33. Cowboys 26–14. **Drive: 5 plays, 30 yards, 2:34.**
- TB – Chase McLaughlin 45-yard field goal, 0:31. Cowboys 26–17. **Drive: 11 plays, 43 yards, 6:02.**

**Fourth quarter**

- TB – Ryan Miller 13-yard pass from Baker Mayfield (Chase McLaughlin kick), 2:36. Cowboys 26–24. **Drive: 9 plays, 87 yards, 2:07.**

**Top passers**

- TB – Baker Mayfield – 31/43, 303 yards, 2 TD, INT
- DAL – Cooper Rush – 26/35, 292 yards, TD

**Top rushers**

- TB – Bucky Irving – 16 rushes, 68 yards, TD
- DAL – Rico Dowdle – 13 rushes, 23 yards

**Top receivers**

- TB – Mike Evans – 5 receptions, 69 yards
- DAL – CeeDee Lamb – 7 receptions, 105 yards

Tampa Bay faced Dallas on Sunday Night Football. Dallas had been eliminated from playoff contention before kickoff when Washington beat Philadelphia earlier in the afternoon. Tampa Bay was attempting to win their fifth straight game and stay one game ahead of Atlanta in the NFC South, as the Falcons had won their game against the Giants earlier in the day.

Trailing 26–24, the Buccaneers got the ball back with 1:40 left in regulation. On 1st and 10 at the 26-yard line, Baker Mayfield was under pressure, and threw a shovel pass to Rachaad White. After a gain of 5 yards, White was tackled and stripped of the ball by Daron Bland, which was then recovered by the Cowboys. Dallas took a knee to run off the clock and secured the victory. With the loss, Tampa Bay snapped their four-game winning streak and slipped to 8–7 and into a tie with Atlanta in the NFC South; the Falcons took over first place holding the head-to-head tiebreaker.

Mike Evans finished the day with 69 yards receiving, putting him just 182 yards shy of his eleventh consecutive 1,000+ yard season with two games remaining.

==== Week 17: vs. Carolina Panthers ====
Week 17: Carolina Panthers at Tampa Bay Buccaneers – Game summary

Quarter	1	2	3	4	Total
Panthers	7	7	0	0	**14**
**Buccaneers**	10	17	14	7	**48**

at Raymond James Stadium, Tampa, Florida

- Date: December 29
- Game time: 1:00 p.m. EST
- Game weather: Cloudy, 76 °F (24 °C)
- Game attendance: 64,434
- Referee: Clay Martin
- TV announcers (CBS): Ian Eagle, Charles Davis and Evan Washburn
- Recap, Game Book

Game information

**First quarter**

- TB – Mike Evans 2-yard pass from Baker Mayfield (Chase McLaughlin kick), 11:35. Buccaneers 7–0. **Drive: 6 plays, 70 yards, 3:25.**
- CAR – Adam Thielen 17-yard pass from Bryce Young (Eddy Piñeiro kick), 8:15. Tied 7–7. **Drive: 6 plays, 70 yards, 3:20.**
- TB – Chase McLaughlin 23-yard field goal, 1:13. Buccaneers 10–7. **Drive: 12 plays, 75 yards, 7:02.**

**Second quarter**

- TB – Chase McLaughlin 34-yard field goal, 10:31. Buccaneers 13–7. **Drive: 10 plays, 45 yards, 4:20.**
- TB – Mike Evans 1-yard pass from Baker Mayfield (Chase McLaughlin kick), 8:19. Buccaneers 20–7. **Drive: 4 plays, 81 yards, 1:50.**
- TB – Jalen McMillan 10-yard pass from Baker Mayfield (Chase McLaughlin kick), 1:11. Buccaneers 27–7. **Drive: 11 plays, 64 yards, 5:38.**
- CAR – Adam Thielen 40-yard pass from Bryce Young (Eddy Piñeiro kick), 0:50. Buccaneers 27–14. **Drive: 4 plays, 70 yards, 0:21.**

**Third quarter**

- TB – Payne Durham 5-yard pass from Baker Mayfield (Chase McLaughlin kick), 5:48. Buccaneers 34–14. **Drive: 10 plays, 94 yards, 5:50.**
- TB – Punt block returned for a touchdown by J. J. Russell (Chase McLaughlin kick), 5:23. Buccaneers 41–14.

**Fourth quarter**

- TB – Jalen McMillan 16-yard pass from Baker Mayfield (Chase McLaughlin kick), 13:30. Buccaneers 48–14. **Drive: 9 plays, 85 yards, 5:03.**

**Top passers**

- CAR – Bryce Young – 15/28, 203 yards, 2 TD
- TB – Baker Mayfield – 27/32, 359 yards, 5 TD

**Top rushers**

- CAR – Raheem Blackshear – 8 rushes, 20 yards
- TB – Bucky Irving – 20 rushes, 113 yards

**Top receivers**

- CAR – Adam Thielen – 5 receptions, 110 yards, 2 TD
- TB – Mike Evans – 8 receptions, 97 yards, 2 TD

Tampa Bay routed division rival Carolina by the score of 48–14 to improve to 9–7, and stay in the hunt for a postseason berth. Baker Mayfield threw for 359 yards and five touchdown passes. Mike Evans had 8 receptions for 97 yards, and two touchdown passes. Evans improved to 915 receiving yards on the season, just 85 yards short of his eleventh consecutive 1,000+ yard season. Running back Bucky Irving had his third game with 100+ yards rushing, and became the first Tampa Bay rookie with 1,000+ yards rushing since Doug Martin in 2012.

With 5:30 left in the third quarter, Carolina faced a 4th and 10 at their own 30-yard line. As the Panthers lined up for punt, a female mallard duck landed on the field, right next to return man Trey Palmer. Seconds later, Johnny Hekker's punt was blocked by Joe Tryon-Shoyinka, then scooped up by J. J. Russell who returned it 23 yards for a touchdown. The Panthers were held to just 204 offensive yards, and were shutout in the second half.

Later in the day on Sunday Night Football, Atlanta lost to Washington in overtime, elevating Tampa Bay into sole possession of first place in the NFC South.

==== Week 18: vs. New Orleans Saints ====
Week 18: New Orleans Saints at Tampa Bay Buccaneers – Game summary

Quarter	1	2	3	4	Total
Saints	3	13	3	0	**19**
**Buccaneers**	3	3	7	14	**27**

at Raymond James Stadium, Tampa, Florida

- Date: January 5
- Game time: 1:00 p.m. EST
- Game weather: Clear, 68 °F (20 °C)
- Game attendance: 63,001
- Referee: Adrian Hill
- TV announcers (Fox): Kevin Burkhardt, Tom Brady, Erin Andrews and Tom Rinaldi
- Recap, Game Book

Game information

**First quarter**

- NO – Blake Grupe 35-yard field goal, 9:16. Saints 3–0. **Drive: 11 plays, 54 yards, 5:44.**
- TB – Chase McLaughlin 52-yard field goal, 4:51. Tied 3–3. **Drive: 9 plays, 43 yards, 4:25.**

**Second quarter**

- NO – Blake Grupe 39-yard field goal, 14:52. Saints 6–3. **Drive: 10 plays, 49 yards, 4:59.**
- NO – Dante Pettis 5-yard pass from Spencer Rattler (Blake Grupe kick), 6:14. Saints 13–3. **Drive: 14 plays, 79 yards, 7:36.**
- TB – Chase McLaughlin 25-yard field goal, 1:03. Saints 13–6. **Drive: 12 plays, 63 yards, 5:11.**
- NO – Blake Grupe 39-yard field goal, 0:07. Saints 16–6. **Drive: 10 plays, 49 yards, 0:56.**

**Third quarter**

- TB – Payne Durham 6-yard pass from Baker Mayfield (Chase McLaughlin kick), 10:27. Saints 16–13. **Drive: 10 plays, 72 yards, 4:33.**
- NO – Blake Grupe 49-yard field goal, 5:53. Saints 19–13. **Drive: 4 plays, 6 yards, 1:36.**

**Fourth quarter**

- TB – Jalen McMillan 32-yard pass from Baker Mayfield (Chase McLaughlin kick), 10:09. Buccaneers 20–19. **Drive: 12 plays, 82 yards, 7:09.**
- TB – Bucky Irving 11-yard run (Chase McLaughlin kick), 1:51. Buccaneers 27–19. **Drive: 12 plays, 94 yards, 5:47.**

**Top passers**

- NO – Spencer Rattler – 26/42, 240 yards, TD
- TB – Baker Mayfield – 21/32, 221 yards, 2 TD, INT

**Top rushers**

- NO – Clyde Edwards-Helaire – 8 rushes, 26 yards
- TB – Bucky Irving – 19 rushes, 89 yards, TD

**Top receivers**

- NO – Juwan Johnson – 6 receptions, 80 yards
- TB – Mike Evans – 9 receptions, 89 yards

Tampa Bay rallied from a 16–6 halftime deficit to defeat division rival New Orleans 27–19. Tampa Bay won the NFC South division title for the fourth consecutive season (a team record), and made the playoffs for the fifth straight year (also a team record). Tampa Bay became the first team in NFL history to start 4–6 and reach the playoffs in two consecutive seasons.

On the first drive of the second half, Baker Mayfield threw a 6-yard touchdown pass to Payne Durham, trimming the deficit to 16–13. But on their next drive, Mayfield threw an interception, which led to a Blake Grupe field goal. New Orleans took a 19–13 lead into the fourth quarter. With 10:49 left in regulation, facing a 4th and 8 at the New Orleans 42-yard line, Mayfield found Jalen McMillan deep downfield for a 33-yard gain. Though there was a penalty after the play, the Buccaneers still had a first down. Two plays later, Mayfield connected to McMillan for a 32-yard touchdown pass to take the lead 20–19 with 10:18 remaining. After forcing a Saints punt, Tampa Bay took over at their own 6-yard line with 7:38 left in regulation. Mayfield drove the Buccaneers 94 yards in 12 plays, the drive capped off with a 11-yard touchdown run by Bucky Irving.

Tampa Bay took a seemingly comfortable 27–19 lead with 1:51 to go, and appeared well in position to win the game and clinch the division. However, wide receiver Mike Evans was still 5 yards shy of 1,000 receiving yards for the season. The Buccaneers defense forced a turnover on downs, and with 36 seconds left on the clock, the offense had one last chance for Evans to reach the milestone. On 1st and 10 at their own 32-yard line, Mayfield found Evans for a 9-yard gain, and Evans earned his eleventh consecutive 1,000+ yard season, tying the NFL record held by Jerry Rice.

=== Standings ===
==== Division ====
NFC South
	W	L	T	PCT	DIV	CONF	PF	PA	STK
^{(3)} Tampa Bay Buccaneers	10	7	0	.588	4–2	8–4	502	385	W2
Atlanta Falcons	8	9	0	.471	4–2	7–5	389	423	L2
Carolina Panthers	5	12	0	.294	2–4	4–8	341	534	W1
New Orleans Saints	5	12	0	.294	2–4	4–8	338	398	L4

==== Conference ====
NFC
Seed	Team	Division	W	L	T	PCT	DIV	CONF	SOS	SOV	STK
**Division leaders**
1	Detroit Lions	North	15	2	0	.882	6–0	11–1	.516	.494	W3
2	Philadelphia Eagles	East	14	3	0	.824	5–1	9–3	.453	.424	W2
3 (Note: Tampa Bay clinched the #3 seed over Los Angeles based on conference record. (Tampa Bay 8–4 to Los Angeles 6–6))	Tampa Bay Buccaneers	South	10	7	0	.588	4–2	8–4	.502	.465	W2
4 (Note: Los Angeles clinched the NFC West and #4 seed over Seattle based on strength of victory. (Los Angeles .441 to Seattle .424))	Los Angeles Rams	West	10	7	0	.588	4–2	6–6	.505	.441	L1
**Wild cards**
5	Minnesota Vikings	North	14	3	0	.824	4–2	9–3	.474	.408	L1
6	Washington Commanders	East	12	5	0	.706	4–2	9–3	.436	.358	W5
7	Green Bay Packers	North	11	6	0	.647	1–5	6–6	.533	.412	L2
**Did not qualify for the postseason**
8	Seattle Seahawks	West	10	7	0	.588	4–2	6–6	.498	.424	W2
9 (Note: Atlanta finished ahead of Arizona based on conference record. (Atlanta 7–5 to Arizona 4–8))	Atlanta Falcons	South	8	9	0	.471	4–2	7–5	.519	.426	L2
10	Arizona Cardinals	West	8	9	0	.471	3–3	4–8	.536	.404	W1
11	Dallas Cowboys	East	7	10	0	.412	3–3	5–7	.522	.387	L2
12	San Francisco 49ers	West	6	11	0	.353	1–5	4–8	.564	.402	L4
13 (Note: Chicago finished ahead of Carolina based on head-to-head victory.)	Chicago Bears	North	5	12	0	.294	1–5	3–9	.554	.388	W1
14 (Note: Carolina finished ahead of New Orleans based on strength of victory. (Carolina .329 to New Orleans .306))	Carolina Panthers	South	5	12	0	.294	2–4	4–8	.498	.329	W1
15	New Orleans Saints	South	5	12	0	.294	2–4	4–8	.505	.306	L4
16	New York Giants	East	3	14	0	.176	0–6	1–11	.554	.412	L1
**Tiebreakers** (Note: When breaking ties for three or more teams under the NFL's rules, they are first broken within divisions, then comparing only the highest ranked remaining team from each division.)

== Postseason ==
=== Schedule ===
Round	Date	Opponent (seed)	Result	Record	Venue	Recap
Wild Card	January 12	Washington Commanders (6)	L 20–23	0–1	Raymond James Stadium	Recap

=== Game summaries ===
==== NFC Wild Card Playoffs: vs. (6) Washington Commanders ====
NFC Wild Card Playoffs: (6) Washington Commanders at (3) Tampa Bay Buccaneers – Game Summary

Quarter	1	2	3	4	Total
Commanders	0	10	3	10	23
Buccaneers	3	7	7	3	20

at Raymond James Stadium, Tampa, Florida

- Date: January 12, 2025
- Game time: 8:00 p.m. EST
- Game weather: Cloudy, 58 °F (14 °C)
- Game attendance: 64,614
- Referee: Craig Wrolstad
- TV announcers (NBC/Peacock): Mike Tirico, Cris Collinsworth and Melissa Stark
- Recap, Game Book

Game information

First quarter

- TB – Chase McLaughlin 50-yard field goal, 11:35. Buccaneers 3–0. Drive: 8 plays, 38 yards, 3:25.

Second quarter

- WAS – Dyami Brown 10-yard pass from Jayden Daniels (Zane Gonzalez kick), 9:26. Commanders 7–3. Drive: 17 plays, 92 yards, 9:08.
- WAS – Zane Gonzalez 52-yard field goal, 1:52. Commanders 10–3. Drive: 11 plays, 37 yards, 5:28.
- TB – Mike Evans 1-yard pass from Baker Mayfield (Chase McLaughlin kick), 0:10. Tied 10–10. Drive: 7 plays, 74 yards, 1:42.

Third quarter

- WAS – Zane Gonzalez 22-yard field goal, 10:30. Commanders 13–10. Drive: 10 plays, 66 yards, 4:30.
- TB – Bucky Irving 4-yard pass from Baker Mayfield (Chase McLaughlin kick), 4:31. Buccaneers 17–13. Drive: 10 plays, 72 yards, 5:59.

Fourth quarter

- WAS – Terry McLaurin 5-yard pass from Jayden Daniels (Zane Gonzalez kick), 9:46. Commanders 20–17. Drive: 4 plays, 13 yards, 2:10.
- TB – Chase McLaughlin 32-yard field goal, 4:41. Tied 20–20. Drive: 8 plays, 61 yards, 5:05.
- WAS – Zane Gonzalez 37-yard field goal, 0:00. Commanders 23–20. Drive: 10 plays, 51 yards, 4:41

Top passers

- WAS – Jayden Daniels – 24/35, 268 yards, 2 TD
- TB – Baker Mayfield – 15/18, 185 yards, 2 TD

Top rushers

- WAS – Jayden Daniels – 13 rushes, 36 yards
- TB – Bucky Irving – 17 rushes, 77 yards

Top receivers

- WAS – Terry McLaurin – 7 receptions, 89 yards, TD
- TB – Mike Evans – 7 receptions, 92 yards, TD

This was the first playoff matchup between Tampa Bay and Washington since the 2020 NFC Wild Card, when the Buccaneers won 31–23 over the then-Washington Football Team, en route to their win in Super Bowl LV. The Commanders and Buccaneers met in Tampa in Week 1 of the regular season, with the Buccaneers winning 37–20. This was the fourth playoff meeting between the two teams, with the Buccaneers holding a 2–1 series lead. In addition, this was Washington's first playoff game as the Commanders.[26]

The Buccaneers opened the scoring on a Chase McLaughlin 50-yard field goal on the game's game's first possession. On the Commanders' first possession, they turned the ball over on downs after a Jayden Daniels pass to Austin Ekeler on fourth down fell incomplete from Tampa Bay's 20-yard line. After the Buccaneers punted, Washington scored on a Daniels pass to Dyami Brown to cap off a 9-minute, 17-play drive. After a successful Zane Gonzalez field goal, which made the score 10–3, Baker Mayfield led the Bucs down the field and scored on a 1-yard pass to Mike Evans, who was covered for most of the first half by rival Marshon Lattimore.[27] This tied the score at 10–10 at halftime.

Gonzalez added another field goal on the Commanders' first possession of the second half, giving Washington a temporary lead. On the next possession, the Buccaneers went ahead 17–13 on a 4-yard Mayfield pass to rookie running back Bucky Irving. The Commanders' next possession saw them drive 67 yards in 12 plays, as the game moved into the fourth quarter. They then failed on a fourth-down conversion for the second time in the game, turning the ball over on downs at the Tampa Bay 3-yard line. Three plays later, Mike Evans made a stretching reach to secure a critical first down, but the Buccaneers gave the ball right back to Washington on the next play. Mayfield committed a costly turnover, a botched handoff to rookie Jalen McMillan on a jet sweep, resulting in a fumble recovered by Bobby Wagner at the Tampa Bay 13. Four plays later, facing yet another fourth-down conversion, a 4th-and-2 at the Tampa Bay 5-yard line, D aniels's pass to Terry McLaurin gave the Commanders a 20–17 lead. On their next possession, late in the fourth quarter, Tampa Bay could not pick up a first down deep in Washington territory after Mayfield was tackled for no gain on 2nd-and-1, and Irving was tackled for a loss on a seemingly botched 3rd-and-1 running play. McLaughlin kicked a 32-yard field goal to tie the score at 20–20.

With 4:41 left in the game, playing in his first playoff game as a rookie, Daniels led the Commanders down the field in position for Zane Gonzalez to kick a 37-yard field goal. In what immediately became known as the 'Divisional Doink' game due to NBC play-by-play announcer Mike TiricTirico's, Gonzalez's kick sailed toward the right upright, hit the post, but fell through, giving the Commanders the 23–20 victory as time expired.[28][29] This was the team's first victory in the playoffs since the 2005–2006 season (coincidentally, also against the Buccaneers in Tampa) and the first under new owner, Josh Harris. For the third game this season, Washington had a no-turnover, no-punt game.[30]

== Awards ==
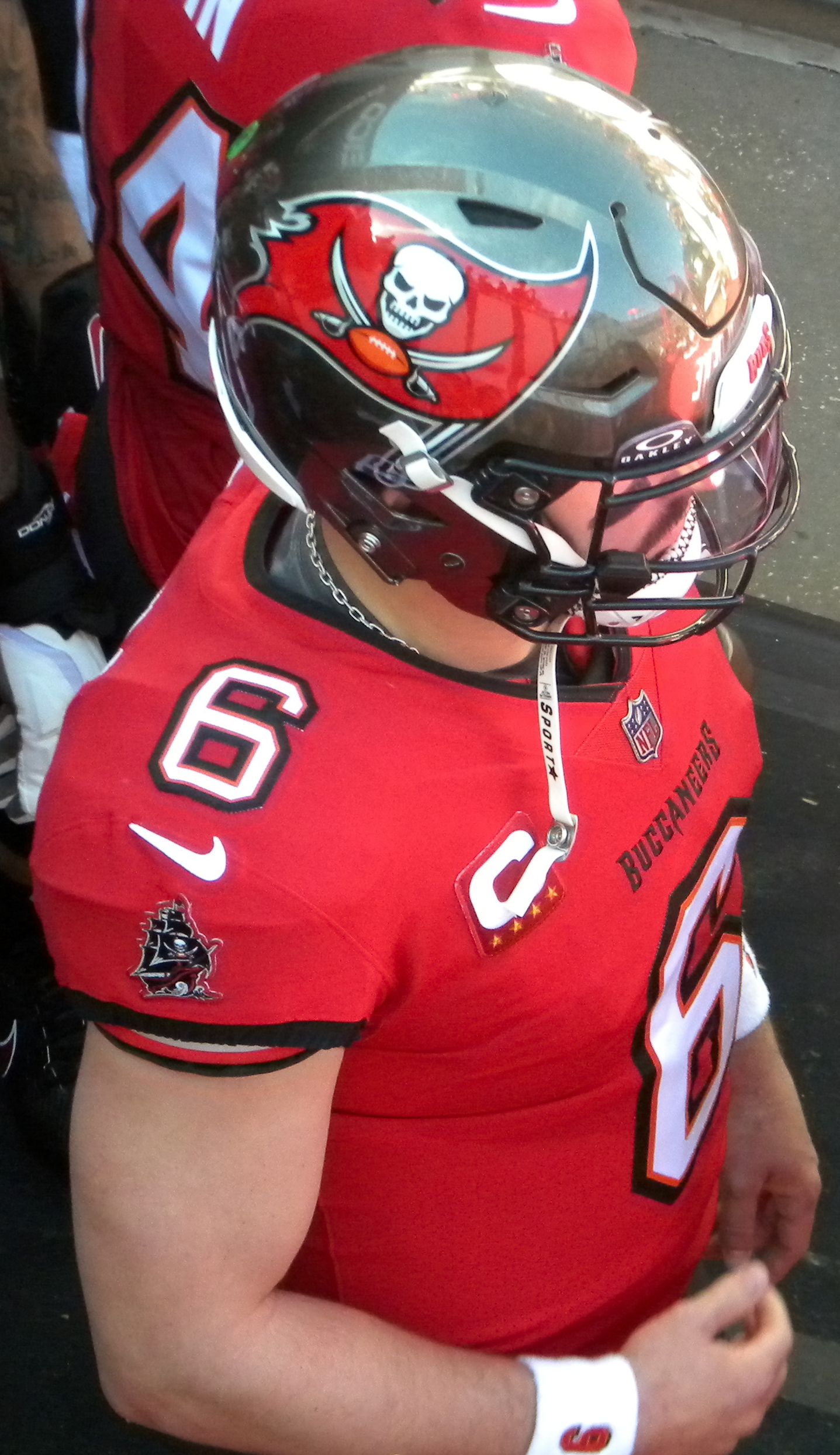
Baker Mayfield

Recipient	Award(s)
Baker Mayfield	Week 1: FedEx Air & Ground Player of the Week; Week 15: NFC Offensive Player of the Week; Week 17: NFC Offensive Player of the Week
Sean Tucker	Week 6: NFC Offensive Player of the Week
Bucky Irving	Week 13: NFC Offensive Player of the Week
Mike Evans	Week 15: FedEx Air & Ground Player of the Week
YaYa Diaby	Week 18: NFC Defensive Player of the Week
