= Jason Licht =

American football executive (born 1971)

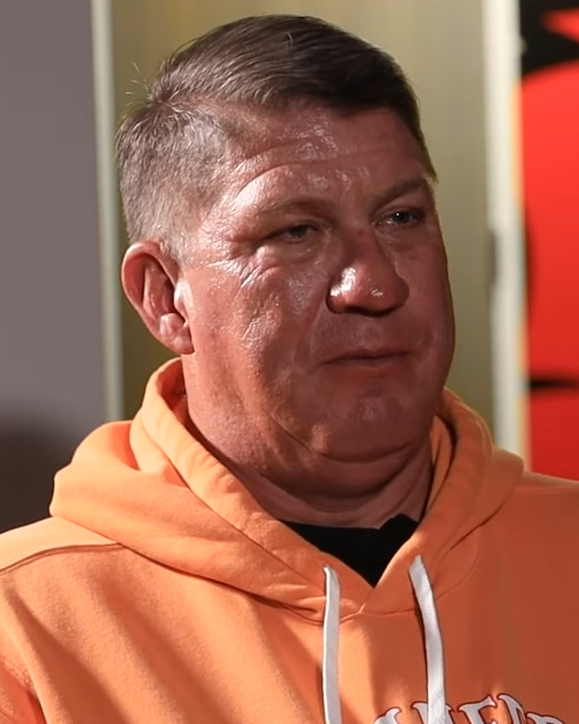
- Licht with the Tampa Bay Buccaneers in 2024

Tampa Bay Buccaneers
- Title: General manager

Personal information
- Born: February 13, 1971 (age 55); Fremont, Nebraska, U.S.

Career information
- Position: Defensive tackle
- College: Nebraska (1989–1991); Nebraska Wesleyan (1992–1993)

Career history

Coaching
- Miami Dolphins (1996) Offensive quality control coordinator

Operations
- Miami Dolphins (1995) Scouting assistant; Carolina Panthers (1998) Scout; New England Patriots (1999–2002); College scout (1999–2000); National scout (2001); Assistant director of player personnel (2002); Philadelphia Eagles (2003–2007); Assistant director of player personnel (2003–2005); Vice president of player personnel (2006–2007); Arizona Cardinals (2008) Personnel executive; New England Patriots (2009–2011) Director of player personnel; Arizona Cardinals (2012–2013); Director of player personnel (2012); Vice president of player personnel (2013); Tampa Bay Buccaneers (2014–present) General manager

Awards and highlights
- 2× Super Bowl champion (XXXVI, LV)
- Executive profile at Pro Football Reference

Jason Ronald Licht (/ˈlaɪt/; born February 13, 1971) is an American professional football executive who is the general manager of the Tampa Bay Buccaneers of the National Football League (NFL), a position he has held since 2014. Before joining the Buccaneers in 2014, Licht worked for the NFL's Miami Dolphins, Carolina Panthers, New England Patriots, Philadelphia Eagles and Arizona Cardinals. In his 26-year executive career, Licht has appeared in five Super Bowls, winning two of them with the Patriots in 2002 and Buccaneers in 2021, both led by Tom Brady. Licht's other appearances were in 2005 with the Eagles, 2009 with the Cardinals, and 2012 with the Patriots.

== Early life ==
Licht was raised in Yuma, Colorado. He played linebacker for the University of Nebraska–Lincoln football team as a freshman in 1989 and offensive guard in 1991 before transferring to Nebraska Wesleyan University, where he played defensive tackle from 1992 to 1993. An all-conference defensive tackle at Nebraska-Wesleyan, Licht earned a bachelor's degree in Biology/Pre-Med. In the summer, he worked as a bartender at The Brass Rail.

== Career ==
=== Front office assistant ===
In 1995, Licht was hired by then-Miami Dolphins scout Tom Heckert as a scouting assistant before serving as the Dolphins' offensive assistant/quality control coach in 1996. Licht then spent the 1997 season working for the college scouting agency National Football Scouting and the 1998 season in the Carolina Panthers' scouting department. From 1999 through 2000, Licht served as a college scout for the Patriots before being promoted to national scout for the 2001 season. He then was promoted to assistant director of player personnel in 2002, a position he held for one season before re-joining Heckert, then the Philadelphia Eagles' vice president of player personnel, in 2003 as the Eagles' assistant director of player personnel.

Upon Heckert's promotion to general manager in 2006, Licht was elevated to vice president of player personnel, but was fired by the team in May 2008. In June 2008, he was hired by the Arizona Cardinals as a personnel executive. Licht left the Cardinals and returned to the Patriots as their director of pro personnel in February 2009.

In 2012, Chicago Bears general manager Jerry Angelo was fired by the team. During the team's hunt, Licht was among the candidates for the general manager job, and he and Phil Emery were the two finalists. The Bears hired Emery, and Licht returned to Arizona as the Cardinals' director of player personnel beginning in 2012 and was promoted to vice president of player personnel in January 2013.

=== General manager ===
On January 21, 2014, the Tampa Bay Buccaneers hired Licht as their general manager. He signed a four-year deal with a fifth-year team option. Licht was officially introduced at One Buc Place two days later. In his first news conference, Licht talked about his plans: "Our philosophy is going to be to build through the draft. That's where we find our stars. That's where we find the next generation. But also in the short term and long term we're going to supplement our roster through free agency. But we're going to look for value. We're going to spend wisely." Despite the team struggles for much of the 2010s, Licht survived three coaching changes (Lovie Smith, Dirk Koetter, and Bruce Arians), and they would not make the playoffs under Licht's tenure until the 2020 season.

The Buccaneers won Super Bowl LV on February 7, 2021. His work in the trade market and free agency helped build his Super Bowl-winning roster. The acquisitions of players like Jason Pierre-Paul, Shaq Barrett, Leonard Fournette, Rob Gronkowski, Antonio Brown, Ndamukong Suh, and Super Bowl MVP Tom Brady were critical in Tampa Bay’s success, as all played big roles on the Super Bowl-winning team. Along with Licht's ability in free agency, he was able to pick up star performers in the draft. Licht drafted players Mike Evans, Vita Vea, Carlton Davis III, Sean Murphy-Bunting, Devin White, Tristan Wirfs, Antoine Winfield Jr., and Chris Godwin, all key parts of their Super Bowl-winning team. Licht was also credited heavily for his efforts to retain key, highly touted, free agents Chris Godwin, Shaquil Barrett, and Lavonte David during the 2021 offseason with the use of salary cap savvy deals.

Since winning Super Bowl LV, Licht has continued to draw praise for keeping the Buccaneers competitive despite significant roster changes. He managed the transition following Brady’s retirement by skillfully restructuring contracts, preserving salary cap flexibility, and adding impact contributors through the draft. Licht's 2023 signing of quarterback Baker Mayfield, who went on to earn Pro Bowl honors and lead Tampa Bay to a division title, was widely cited as one of the most impactful free agent moves of that offseason. Notable draft selections such as Luke Goedeke, Rachaad White, Cade Otton, Calijah Kancey, Cody Mauch, Yaya Diaby, Graham Barton, Jalen McMillan, Bucky Irving, and Emeka Egbuka have further reinforced his reputation for identifying long-term starters and Pro Bowl-caliber talent. Under Licht’s leadership, Tampa Bay became the only NFC team to reach the postseason in each of the 2020 through 2024 seasons, a stretch highlighted by four consecutive NFC South titles from 2021 to 2024. His roster-building approach and ability to retain core veterans while developing younger players have been credited as central to the franchise's sustained success. As of the start of the 2025 season, Licht was the fifth-longest tenured General Manager in the National Football League.

On June 26, 2025, Licht signed a multi-year contract extension with the Buccaneers.
