= Chris Braswell =

American football player (born 2001)

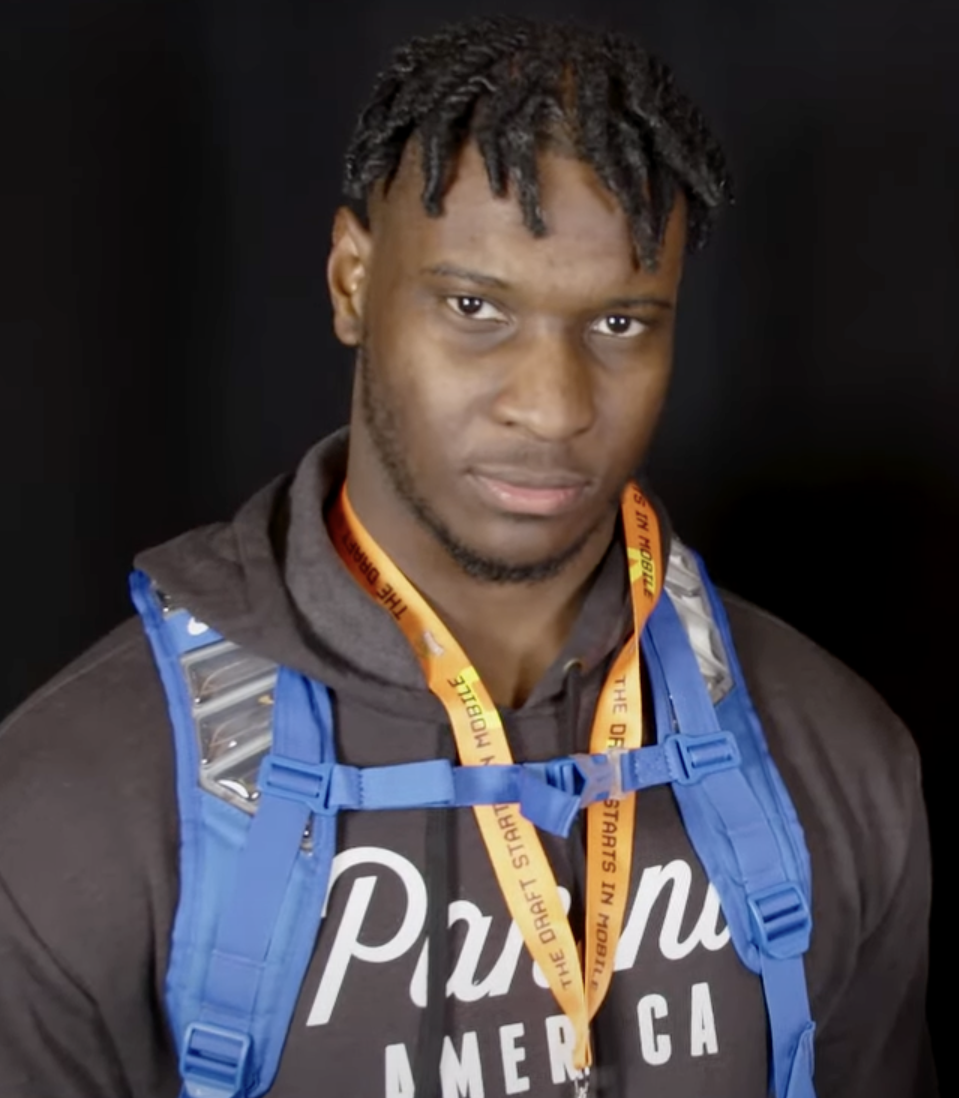
- Braswell in 2024

No. 53 – Houston Texans
- Position: Outside linebacker
- Roster status: Practice squad

Personal information
- Born: October 25, 2001 (age 25); Baltimore, Maryland, U.S.
- Listed height: 6 ft 3 in (1.91 m)
- Listed weight: 255 lb (116 kg)

Career information
- High school: Saint Frances Academy (Baltimore)
- College: Alabama (2020–2023)
- NFL draft: 2024: 2nd round, 57th overall pick

Career history
- Tampa Bay Buccaneers (2024–2025); Houston Texans (2026–present)

Awards and highlights
- Second-team All-SEC (2023)

Career NFL statistics as of 2025
- Tackles: 48
- Sacks: 2.5
- Forced fumbles: 1
- Stats at Pro Football Reference

Chris Braswell (born October 25, 2001) is an American professional football outside linebacker for the Houston Texans of the National Football League (NFL). He played college football for the Alabama Crimson Tide.

== Early life ==
Braswell was born on October 25, 2001, in Baltimore, Maryland, later attending Saint Frances Academy. After his senior season, he played in the 2020 Under Armour All-America Game. Braswell was rated a five-star recruit and committed to play college football at Alabama over offers from Georgia, LSU, Clemson, and Ohio State.

== Personal life ==
Braswell converted to Islam at the age of 10. During his time in Alabama, he was an active member at the Islamic Society of Tuscaloosa. He has influenced several of his teammates to embrace the religion as well.As a devout Muslim, he fasts in observance of Ramadan even during practices, drills, and games.

== College career ==
Braswell joined the Alabama Crimson Tide as an early enrollee in January 2020. He did not play in any games during his freshman season. Braswell played on Alabama's special teams unit and was a rotational pass rusher in 2021 and finished the season with 11 tackles, one tackle for loss, and two quarterback hurries. As a junior, he primarily served as the Crimson Tide's pass rush rotation and was part of the team's "cheetah" package, a defensive alignment that includes three outside linebackers instead of two. Braswell finished the season with 20 tackles, four tackles for loss, 2.5 sacks, six quarterback pressures, and one forced fumble. After considering entering the 2023 NFL draft, he opted to return to Alabama for his senior season.

== Professional career ==
Pre-draft measurables
Height	Weight	Arm length	Hand span	Wingspan	40-yard dash	10-yard split	20-yard split	Vertical jump	Broad jump
6 ft 3 3/8 in (1.91 m)	251 lb (114 kg)	33 1/4 in (0.84 m)	9 3/8 in (0.24 m)	6 ft 9 3/8 in (2.07 m)	4.60 s	1.59 s	2.67 s	33.5 in (0.85 m)	9 ft 7 in (2.92 m)
All values from NFL Combine

=== Tampa Bay Buccaneers ===
Braswell was selected by the Tampa Bay Buccaneers in the second round (57th overall) of the 2024 NFL draft. In Week 17 of his rookie season against the Carolina Panthers, he sacked Bryce Young for a loss of five yards in the fourth quarter (his first career solo sack), as well as forced his first career fumble.

On August 30, 2026, Braswell was waived by the Buccaneers as a part of final roster cuts.

=== Houston Texans ===
On September 1, 2026, Braswell was signed to the Houston Texans' practice squad. On September 30, he was promoted to the active roster. He was waived on October 13 and re-signed to the practice squad two days later.

== NFL career statistics ==
Legend
**Bold**	Career high

=== Regular season ===
Year	Team	Games		Tackles					Interceptions						Fumbles				
Year	Team	GP	GS	Cmb	Solo	Ast	Sck	TFL	Int	Yds	Avg	Lng	TD	PD	FF	Fum	FR	Yds	TD
2024	TB	17	0	18	11	7	**1.5**	1	0	0	0.0	0	0	0	**1**	0	0	0	0
2025	TB	17	0	**30**	**21**	**9**	1.0	**4**	0	0	0.0	0	0	0	0	0	0	0	0
Career		34	0	48	32	16	2.5	5	0	0	0.0	0	0	0	1	0	0	0	0

=== Postseason ===
Year	Team	Games		Tackles					Interceptions						Fumbles				
Year	Team	GP	GS	Cmb	Solo	Ast	Sck	TFL	Int	Yds	Avg	Lng	TD	PD	FF	Fum	FR	Yds	TD
2024	TB	1	0	0	0	0	0.0	0	0	0	0.0	0	0	0	0	0	0	0	0
Career		1	0	0	0	0	0.0	0	0	0	0.0	0	0	0	0	0	0	0	0
