= Buccaneers–Panthers rivalry =

National Football League rivalry

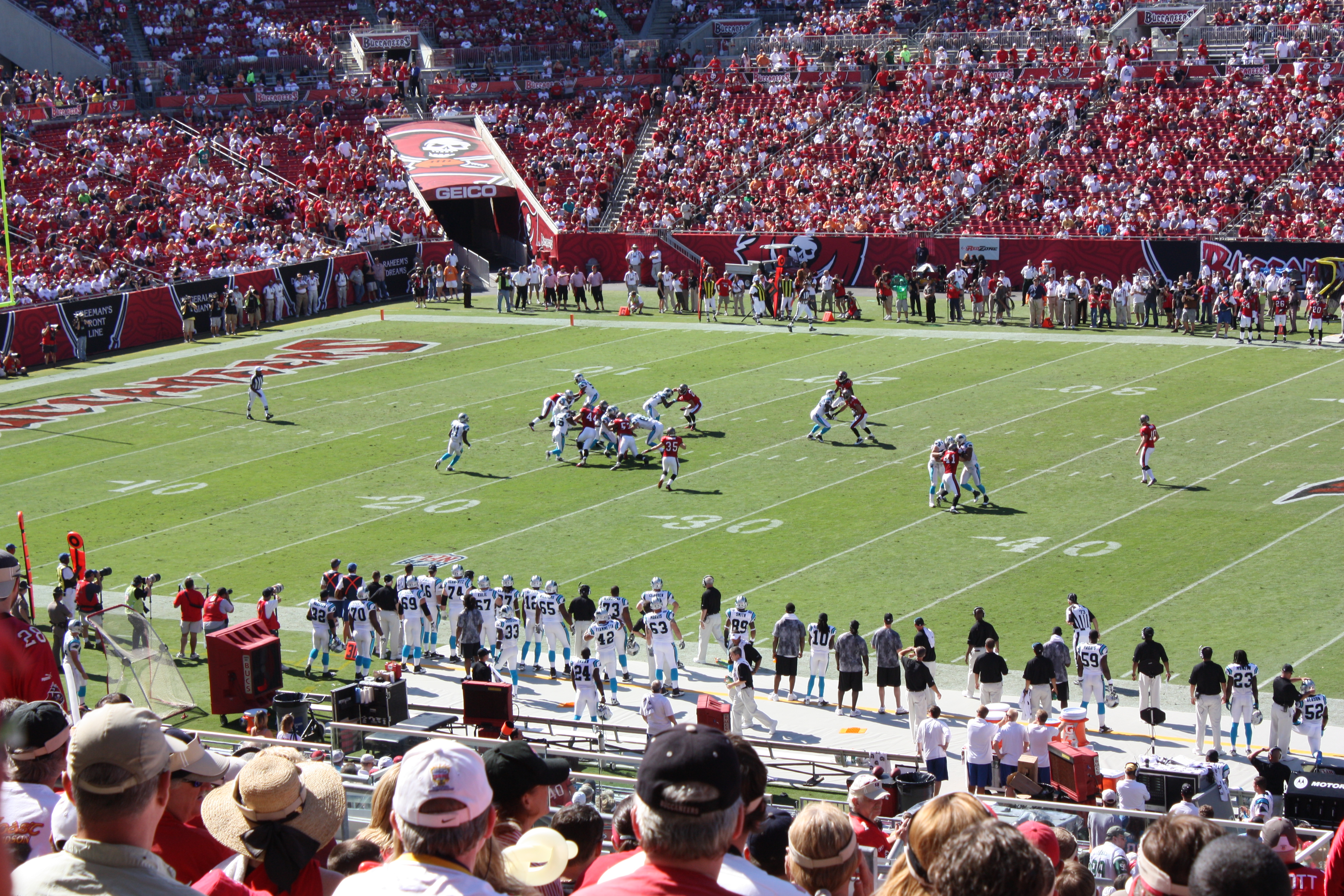
- Buccaneers and Panthers face off during the 2010 season.

- Tampa Bay Buccaneers Carolina Panthers
- Location: Tampa, Charlotte
- First meeting: October 1, 1995; Buccaneers 20, Panthers 13
- Latest meeting: October 25, 2026; Buccaneers 43, Panthers 13
- Next meeting: November 30, 2026
- Stadiums: Buccaneers: Raymond James Stadium; Panthers: Bank of America Stadium

Statistics
- Total meetings: 52
- All-time series: Tied: 26–26
- Largest victory: Buccaneers: 48–14 (2024); Panthers: 48–16 (2011)
- Most points scored: Buccaneers: 48 (2024); Panthers: 48 (2011)
- Longest win streak: Buccaneers: 5 (2022–2024); Panthers: 6 (2013–2016)
- Current win streak: Buccaneers: 2 (2025–present)
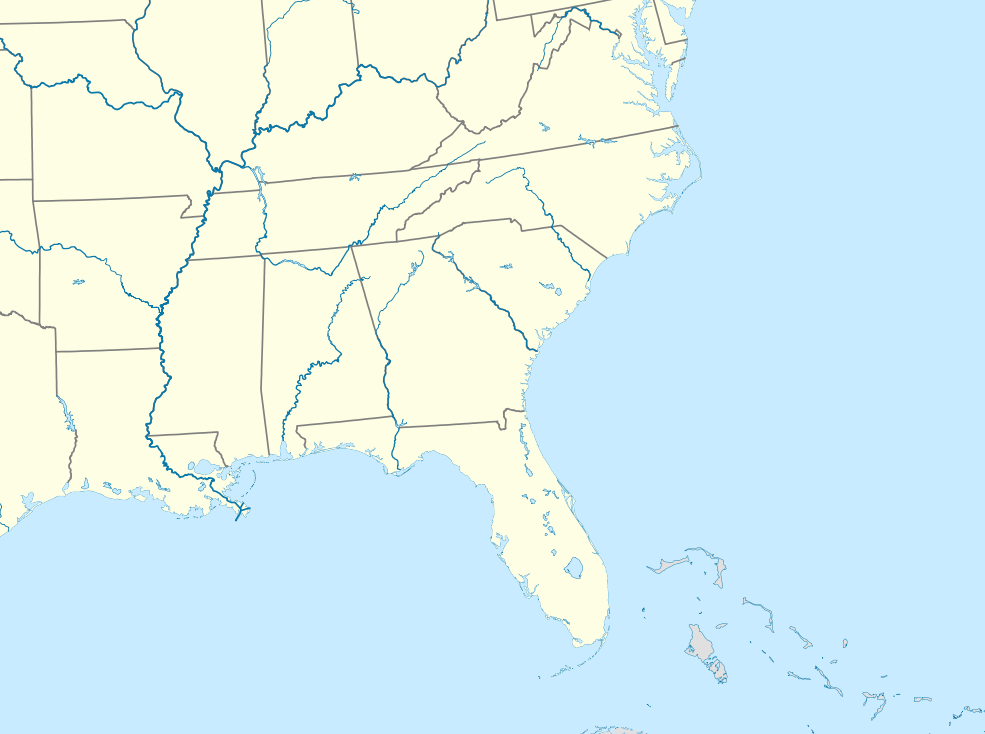

The Buccaneers–Panthers rivalry is a National Football League (NFL) rivalry between the Tampa Bay Buccaneers and Carolina Panthers.

The two teams met for the first time in 1995 when the Panthers were an expansion team. However, the rivalry did not develop until 2002, when the Panthers and Buccaneers were placed in the newly formed NFC South division, resulting in two meetings annually. The matchup immediately became popular, and by many accounts intensified into a heated rivalry starting in 2003, as the Panthers and Buccaneers were contenders for the NFC South title for much of the early-to-mid 2000s.

The annual games have been described as "physical" and numerous players have suffered season-ending injuries. Among the most serious were Chris Simms, who suffered a ruptured spleen in 2006, and Kavika Pittman, who suffered a career-ending knee injury. Return specialist Clifton Smith suffered concussions in both meetings in 2009, the first from a high hit by Dante Wesley, who was subsequently ejected and suspended for one game.

The overall series is tied, 26–26. The two teams have not met in the playoffs.

== Notable moments ==
=== 1990s ===
The Carolina Panthers joined the NFL as an expansion team in 1995. For the first seven years of their existence, they were part of the NFC West division, while the Tampa Bay Buccaneers were part of the NFC Central during that time. The two teams happened to play as intra-conference opponents in the Panthers' inaugural season. The Buccaneers won 20–13 after a quarterback sneak by Casey Weldon in the fourth quarter. This game took place at Clemson University, the Panthers temporary home during their first season.

The teams met again the following season (1996), with Carolina prevailing 24–0. It would remain the only shutout in the series' history until 2024, on the way to Carolina's first appearance in the NFC Championship Game. It was also the first meeting at the newly constructed Ericsson Stadium. The two teams would never meet at Tampa Stadium before it was demolished.

=== 2000s ===
In 2002, the Panthers and Buccaneers were placed into the newly formed NFC South division. They became division rivals, and would begin an annual two-game, home/away series each season. In 2002, Tampa Bay swept the regular season series en route to their Super Bowl victory. The second meeting, at Tampa, was a highly anticipated defensive struggle - Tampa Bay entered the game ranked #1 in total defense, while Carolina ranked #3. However, Tampa Bay won a largely one-sided contest. The Buccaneers racked up 314 yards of offense, forced four turnovers, and sacked Peete four times. The Buccaneers won by a score of 23–10, improving to 8–2 on the season, a franchise record after ten games.

In 2003, the Buccaneers hosted Carolina in Week 2. A defensive-oriented game saw young Carolina quarterback Jake Delhomme held to only 9-for-23, 96 yards and two interceptions. Meanwhile, Brad Johnson threw for 339 yards. Special teams breakdowns cost the Buccaneers dearly. After two earlier botched field goal attempts, the Buccaneers trailed 9–3 late in the fourth quarter. On the last play of regulation, Brad Johnson connected to Keenan McCardell for a dramatic game-tying touchdown pass in the back of the endzone time expired. The extra point would have given Tampa Bay the win. Martin Gramatica's extra point attempt, however, was blocked. The game went to overtime tied 9–9. Both teams traded possessions, and with just over 6 minutes left in the overtime period, Tampa Bay punted to Carolina. Steve Smith returned the punt 52 yards to the Tampa Bay 40-yard line. Five plays later, Carolina won 12–9 after a 47-yard field goal.

In week 10 of the 2003 season, the surging Panthers hosted the now-sputtering Buccaneers. Carolina broke out to a 20–7 lead through three quarters, but the Buccaneers rallied in the fourth quarter for 17 points. Tampa Bay took a 24–20 lead with 2:45 to go. The Buccaneer defense, however, failed to keep Carolina at bay, and Jake Delhomme swiftly led the Panthers to a game-winning touchdown with 1:11 left. Carolina, nicknamed the "Cardiac Cats" that season, swept the season series for the first time, en route to their first Super Bowl appearance.

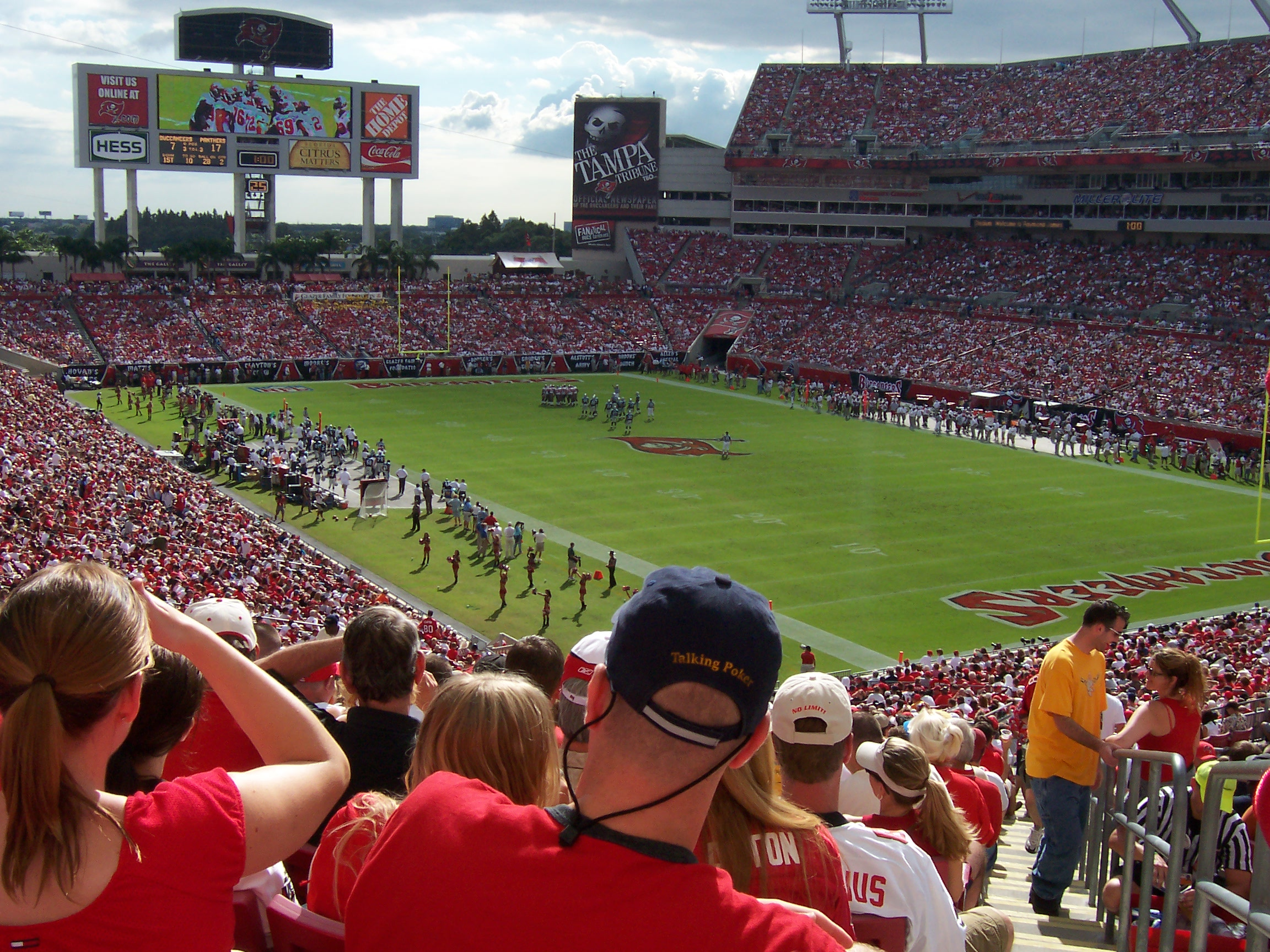
Tampa Bay hosting Carolina on November 6, 2005

Both Carolina and Tampa Bay were playoff contenders in 2005, and battled neck-and-neck all season for the NFC South division title. The first meeting on November 6 at Raymond James Stadium saw both teams enter at 5–2, and in a tie for first place in the division. The Panthers intercepted Chris Simms twice, one returned for a touchdown, and Carolina rolled 34–14. It was Carolina's fifth straight victory against Tampa Bay, the longest winning streak between the two teams in the series' history.

On December 11, Tampa Bay and Carolina faced each other again, with the division title effectively on the line. Tampa Bay broke a five-game losing streak to Carolina, winning by a score of 20–10. With 11:47 remaining in the fourth quarter, Ronde Barber intercepted Jake Delhomme, which set up a game-icing touchdown by Carnell Williams.

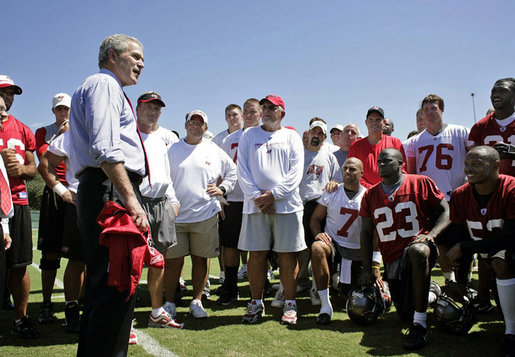
President George W. Bush visiting the Bucs at practice before their 2006 game against the Panthers

Neither team made the playoffs in 2006, however, the first meeting between the two teams on September 24 is remembered for the injury to Chris Simms. Both teams entered at 0–2, and the game turned into a hard-hitting, physical contest in hot, humid conditions. Late in the third quarter, Tampa Bay quarterback Chris Simms was hit on a two-yard bootleg play. He had to momentarily leave the game. Initially diagnosed as bruised ribs, Simms returned minutes later to lead a go-ahead field goal drive. Simms received several other vicious hits that likely aggravated his condition. Carolina got the ball back with less than two minutes left. With only six seconds left in regulation, Panthers kicker John Kasay kicked a game-winning field goal, and Carolina won 26–24.

After the game, Simms complained of ongoing pain, and was admitted to the hospital. It was discovered that he had suffered a ruptured spleen, was experiencing internal bleeding, and required immediate emergency surgery. Had the injury not been diagnosed in a timely manner, it could have been fatal. Simms was placed on injured reserve, and ultimately never played another down with the Buccaneers.

On December 8, 2008, the teams met tied atop division and were fighting for a possible first-round playoff bye. The game had a "playoff atmosphere." The game turned Carolina's way early, and despite a Bucs rally, the Panthers won convincingly. Carolina steamrolled the Buccaneers defense with 299-yard rushing, and essentially clinched the NFC South division with the victory. The loss started Tampa Bay on a downhill spiral, and the Buccaneers dropped the next three games as well. Tampa Bay fell to 9–7 and missed the playoffs. Shortly thereafter, head coach Jon Gruden was fired. Carolina improved to 12–4 and won the division, but were knocked out of the playoffs in the division round by Arizona.

=== 2010s ===
In 2011, Carolina, behind rookie quarterback Cam Newton, swept the series in dominating fashion. In the first meeting, Tampa Bay wore their orange throwback uniforms, but were without Josh Freeman due to injury. The Panthers rolled 38–19, with Newton setting a single-season NFL record for rushing touchdowns by a quarterback. Three weeks later, Newton set the NFL rookie passing yards record, also against Tampa Bay, routing the Buccaneers 48–16.

In 2012, Tampa Bay rebounded to sweep the season series. The two teams met in Week 1, with the Buccaneers prevailing 16–10. Tampa Bay held the Panthers and Cam Newton to only 10 yards rushing. In Week 11, the two teams met again in another close game. The Panthers led 21–10 with just over four minutes left in regulation. A field goal by Tampa Bay trimmed the lead to 21–13. The Buccaneers got the ball back with 1:02 left in the fourth quarter. Josh Freeman drove the Buccaneers 80 yards for a touchdown with 20 seconds to go. The two-point conversion tied the game at 21, sending it to overtime. Tampa Bay won the coin toss, and proceeded to score an 80-yard touchdown drive on the first possession, winning 27–21.

The Panthers swept the Buccaneers in 2013, 2014, and 2015. In 2015, Carolina won both meetings en route to their appearance in Super Bowl 50. In week 17, Carolina's 38–10 victory gave them a franchise-best 15–1 regular season record. A few days after the game, Buccaneers head coach Lovie Smith was dismissed.

Tampa Bay snapped Carolina's six game winning streak in the series in 2016. With Newton sidelined due to a concussion, Derek Anderson started for Carolina. Anderson threw two interceptions and lost one fumble. With the game tied 14–14, Tampa Bay drove to the Panthers 20-yard line in the final minute. After missing two attempts earlier in the game, Roberto Aguayo kicked a 38-yard game-winning field goal as time expired. In week 17, Tampa Bay won by a score of 17–16. The Buccaneers secured the victory when the Panthers failed on a game-winning two-point conversion attempt with 17 seconds remaining in regulation.

During the 2019 season, the two teams met at Tottenham Hotspur Stadium as part of the NFL International Series.

=== 2020s ===
Tampa Bay signed quarterback Tom Brady prior to the 2020 season. Around the same time, Carolina parted ways with Cam Newton, who had been suffering through two injury-plagued seasons. The Buccaneers swept Carolina in 2020, their first season sweep since 2016, en route to a victory in Super Bowl LV. Tampa Bay swept the Panthers again, winning the NFC South in 2021, the first time sweeping in consecutive seasons. At four games, it was also Tampa Bay's longest win streak in the rivalry.

In 2022, Carolina defeated Tampa Bay 21–3 in their first meeting in Charlotte in October. The result was seen as an upset, as the Panthers were only 1–5 entering the game. In Week 17, the two teams faced each other in Tampa, with the NFC South title on the line. Tom Brady threw three touchdown passes to Mike Evans, and won the game 30–24, clinching the division title.

In week 18 of the 2025 NFL season, the Panthers and Buccaneers played a game to determine control of the NFC South division. While the Buccaneers won 16-14, an Atlanta Falcons win against the New Orleans Saints still gave Carolina the division title due to tiebreakers.

In 2026, the Buccaneers won a convincing 43–13 victory on October 25. It marked Tampa Bay's 11th win over the Panthers in the past 13 meetings, and pulled the all-time series even at 26–26.

== Season-by-season results ==
Tampa Bay Buccaneers vs. Carolina Panthers Season-by-Season Results
1990s (Buccaneers, 2–1)

Season	Results	Location	Overall series	Notes
1995	Buccaneers; 20–13	Memorial Stadium	Buccaneers; 1–0	Panthers join the National Football League (NFL) as an expansion team. They were placed in the National Football Conference (NFC) and the NFC West. Only meeting at Memorial Stadium.
1996	Panthers; 24–0	Ericsson Stadium	Tie; 1–1	Panthers open Ericsson Stadium (now known as Bank of America Stadium).
1998	Buccaneers; 16–13	Raymond James Stadium	Buccaneers; 2–1	Buccaneers open Raymond James Stadium.

2000s (Panthers, 11–5)

Season	Season series	at Tampa Bay Buccaneers	at Carolina Panthers	Overall series	Notes
2002	Buccaneers 2–0	Buccaneers; 23–10	Buccaneers; 12–9	Buccaneers; 4–1	During the NFL realignment, the Buccaneers and Panthers are placed in the NFC South, resulting in two meetings annually. Buccaneers win Super Bowl XXXVII.
2003	Panthers 2–0	Panthers; 12–9 (OT)	Panthers; 27–24	Buccaneers; 4–3	Panthers lose Super Bowl XXXVIII.
2004	Panthers 2–0	Panthers; 37–20	Panthers; 21–14	Panthers; 5–4	
2005	Tie 1–1	Panthers; 34–14	Buccaneers; 20–10	Panthers; 6–5	Both teams finished with 11–5 records, but the Buccaneers clinched the NFC South based on a better division record.
2006	Panthers 2–0	Panthers; 26–24	Panthers; 24–10	Panthers; 8–5	In Tampa, Panthers' K John Kasay kicks the game-winning field goal with six seconds left.
2007	Tie 1–1	Panthers; 31–23	Buccaneers; 20–7	Panthers; 9–6	
2008	Tie 1–1	Buccaneers; 27–3	Panthers; 38–23	Panthers; 10–7	
2009	Panthers 2–0	Panthers; 28–21	Panthers; 16–6	Panthers; 12–7	

2010s (Panthers, 12–8)

Season	Season series	at Tampa Bay Buccaneers	at Carolina Panthers	Overall series	Notes
2010	Buccaneers 2–0	Buccaneers; 31–16	Buccaneers; 20–7	Panthers; 12–9	
2011	Panthers 2–0	Panthers; 38–19	Panthers; 48–16	Panthers; 14–9	Panthers draft QB Cam Newton. In Carolina, Panthers record their largest victory against the Buccaneers with a 32–point differential and score their most points in a game against the Buccaneers.
2012	Buccaneers 2–0	Buccaneers; 16–10	Buccaneers; 27–21 (OT)	Panthers; 14–11	
2013	Panthers 2–0	Panthers; 31–13	Panthers; 27–6	Panthers; 16–11	
2014	Panthers 2–0	Panthers; 20–14	Panthers; 19–17	Panthers; 18–11	
2015	Panthers 2–0	Panthers; 37–23	Panthers; 38–10	Panthers; 20–11	Panthers lose Super Bowl 50.
2016	Buccaneers 2–0	Buccaneers; 17–16	Buccaneers; 17–14	Panthers; 20–13	
2017	Panthers 2–0	Panthers; 17–3	Panthers; 22–19	Panthers; 22–13	
2018	Tie 1–1	Buccaneers; 24–17	Panthers; 42–28	Panthers; 23–14	
2019	Tie 1–1	Panthers; 37–26	Buccaneers; 20–14	Panthers; 24–15	Buccaneers' home game was played at Tottenham Hotspur Stadium in Tottenham, London as part of the NFL International Series.

2020s (Buccaneers, 11–2)

Season	Season series	at Tampa Bay Buccaneers	at Carolina Panthers	Overall series	Notes
2020	Buccaneers 2–0	Buccaneers; 31–17	Buccaneers; 46–23	Panthers; 24–17	Buccaneers sign QB Tom Brady. Buccaneers win Super Bowl LV.
2021	Buccaneers 2–0	Buccaneers; 41–17	Buccaneers; 32–6	Panthers; 24–19	In Carolina, Buccaneers clinched their first NFC South title since the 2007 season with their win. Last season for Panthers' QB Cam Newton.
2022	Tie 1–1	Buccaneers; 30–24	Panthers; 21–3	Panthers; 25–20	Buccaneers clinch the NFC South with their win. Game in Tampa was QB Tom Brady's last career victory.
2023	Buccaneers 2–0	Buccaneers; 21–18	Buccaneers; 9–0	Panthers; 25–22	In Carolina, the Buccaneers clinch their third consecutive NFC South with their win.
2024	Buccaneers 2–0	Buccaneers; 48–14	Buccaneers; 26–23 (OT)	Panthers; 25–24	In Tampa, the Buccaneers record their largest victory against the Panthers with a 34–point differential and scored their most points in a game against the Panthers.
2025	Tie 1–1	Buccaneers; 16–14	Panthers; 23–20	Panthers; 26–25	Despite the loss, the Panthers clinched the NFC South title when the Falcons defeated the Saints. The Panthers, Buccaneers, and Falcons all finished 8–9, but Carolina won the three-way tiebreaker based on head-to-head record among the tied teams, eliminating the Buccaneers from playoff contention.
2026	Buccaneers 1–0	November 30	Buccaneers; 43–13	Tied; 26–26	

Summary of Results

Season	Season series	at Tampa Bay Buccaneers	at Carolina Panthers	Notes
Regular season	Tied 26–26	Buccaneers 13–12	Panthers 14–13	Panthers are 1–0 at Tottenham Hotspur Stadium in Tottenham, London (2019), accounted for as a Buccaneers home game.

== See also ==
- List of NFL rivalries
- NFC South

== Notes ==
=== Works cited ===
- BucPower.com
