= YaYa Diaby =

American football player (born 1999)

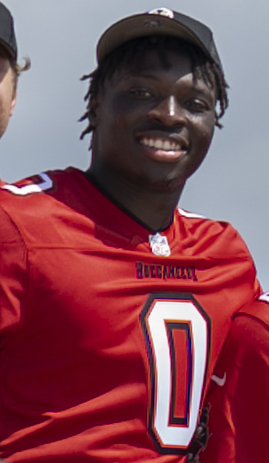
- Diaby with the Tampa Bay Buccaneers in 2023

No. 0 – Tampa Bay Buccaneers
- Position: Outside linebacker
- Roster status: Active

Personal information
- Born: May 30, 1999 (age 27); Atlanta, Georgia, U.S.
- Listed height: 6 ft 4 in (1.93 m)
- Listed weight: 270 lb (122 kg)

Career information
- High school: North Clayton (College Park, Georgia)
- College: Georgia Military (2018–2019); Louisville (2020–2022)
- NFL draft: 2023: 3rd round, 82nd overall pick

Career history
- Tampa Bay Buccaneers (2023–present)

Awards and highlights
- Third-team All-ACC (2022)

Career NFL statistics as of Week 5, 2026
- Total tackles: 151
- Sacks: 19
- Forced fumbles: 3
- Fumble recoveries: 3
- Pass deflections: 3
- Interceptions: 1
- Stats at Pro Football Reference

YaYa Diaby (born May 30, 1999) is an American professional football outside linebacker for the Tampa Bay Buccaneers of the National Football League (NFL). He played college football for the Georgia Military Bulldogs before transferring to the Louisville Cardinals.

== Early life ==
Diaby attended North Clayton High School in College Park, Georgia. He is of Guinean descent.

== College career ==
Diaby attended Georgia Military College for two years before transferring to the University of Louisville. He had 77 tackles and seven sacks at Georgia Military. In Diaby's first year at Louisville in 2020, he started seven of eight games, recording 18 tackles. In 2021, he had 39 tackles and 1.5 sacks. In 2022, Diaby had 37 tackles and nine sacks. After the season, he entered the 2023 NFL draft.

== Professional career ==
Pre-draft measurables
Height	Weight	Arm length	Hand span	Wingspan	40-yard dash	10-yard split	20-yard split	Vertical jump	Broad jump
6 ft 3 3/8 in (1.91 m)	263 lb (119 kg)	33 7/8 in (0.86 m)	10 3/8 in (0.26 m)	6 ft 8 1/2 in (2.04 m)	4.51 s	1.56 s	2.62 s	37.0 in (0.94 m)	10 ft 0 in (3.05 m)
All values from the NFL Combine

Diaby was selected by the Tampa Bay Buccaneers in the third round of the 2023 NFL draft with the 82nd overall pick. As a rookie, Diaby played in all 17 regular season games and made seven starts. He finished with 38 total tackles (25 solo), one forced fumble, and two fumble recoveries. He started both of the Buccaneers' postseason games.

In Week 18 of the 2024 season, Diaby recorded five tackles, four for a loss, and one sack in a 29–17 win over the New Orleans Saints, earning NFC Defensive Player of the Week.

== NFL career statistics ==
Legend
**Bold**	Career high

=== Regular season ===
Year	Team	Games		Tackles					Interceptions						Fumbles				
Year	Team	GP	GS	Cmb	Solo	Ast	Sck	TFL	Int	Yds	Avg	Lng	TD	PD	FF	Fum	FR	Yds	TD
2023	TB	17	7	38	25	13	**7.5**	12	0	0	0.0	0	0	0	**1**	0	**2**	-2	0
2024	TB	17	17	**54**	**39**	15	4.5	**13**	0	0	0.0	0	0	0	**1**	0	1	**0**	0
2025	TB	17	17	50	29	**21**	7.0	**13**	0	0	0.0	0	0	1	**1**	0	0	0	0
2026	TB	5	5	9	5	4	0.0	2	**1**	**1**	**1.0**	**1**	0	**2**	0	0	0	0	0
Career		56	46	151	98	53	19.0	40	1	1	1.0	1	0	3	3	0	3	-2	0

=== Postseason ===
Year	Team	Games		Tackles					Interceptions						Fumbles				
Year	Team	GP	GS	Cmb	Solo	Ast	Sck	TFL	Int	Yds	Avg	Lng	TD	PD	FF	Fum	FR	Yds	TD
2023	TB	2	2	**4**	**3**	1	0.0	0	0	0	0.0	0	0	0	0	0	0	0	0
2024	TB	1	1	**4**	2	**2**	0.0	**1**	0	0	0.0	0	0	0	0	0	0	0	0
Career		3	3	8	5	3	0.0	1	0	0	0.0	0	0	0	0	0	0	0	0
