= Bucky Irving =

American football player (born 2002)

No. 7 – Tampa Bay Buccaneers
- Position: Running back
- Roster status: Active

Personal information
- Born: August 19, 2002 (age 24); Chicago, Illinois, U.S.
- Listed height: 5 ft 9 in (1.75 m)
- Listed weight: 195 lb (88 kg)

Career information
- High school: Hillcrest (Country Club Hills, Illinois)
- College: Minnesota (2021); Oregon (2022–2023)
- NFL draft: 2024: 4th round, 125th overall pick

Career history
- Tampa Bay Buccaneers (2024–present)

Awards and highlights
- PFWA All-Rookie Team (2024); Second-team All-Pac-12 (2023)

Career NFL statistics as of Week 7, 2026
- Rushing yards: 2,268
- Rushing average: 4.5
- Rushing touchdowns: 13
- Receptions: 95
- Receiving yards: 747
- Receiving touchdowns: 4
- Stats at Pro Football Reference

Mar'Keise "Bucky" Irving (born August 19, 2002) is an American professional football running back for the Tampa Bay Buccaneers of the National Football League (NFL). He played college football for the Minnesota Golden Gophers and Oregon Ducks.

== Early life ==
Irving attended Hillcrest High School in Country Club Hills, Illinois. He did not play football his senior year in 2020 due to the COVID-19 pandemic. He finished his high school career with 3,264 rushing yards. Irving committed to the University of Minnesota to play college football.

== College career ==
As a true freshman at Minnesota in 2021, Irving rushed 133 times for 699 yards and four touchdowns. After the season he transferred to the University of Oregon. During his first year at Oregon, Irving totaled 1,357 yards from scrimmage and eight total touchdowns (rushing and receiving). In his second season (2023) Irving had 1,180 rushing yards and 11 touchdowns on 186 carries. He also caught 56 passes for 413 yards and two more touchdowns. Irving earned Associated Press All-Pac-12 first team, Coaches All-Pac-12 first team, Pro Football Focus All-Pac-12 first team, Phil Steele All-Pac-12 first team and CSC Academic All-America first team.

== Professional career ==
Pre-draft measurables
Height	Weight	Arm length	Hand span	Wingspan	40-yard dash	10-yard split	20-yard split	Vertical jump	Broad jump	Bench press
5 ft 9 in (1.75 m)	192 lb (87 kg)	29 1/2 in (0.75 m)	9 1/2 in (0.24 m)	5 ft 10 5/8 in (1.79 m)	4.55 s	1.54 s	2.67 s	31.5 in (0.80 m)	9 ft 7 in (2.92 m)	15 reps
All values from NFL Combine/Pro Day

=== 2024 season ===
Irving was selected in the fourth round with the 125th overall pick by the Tampa Bay Buccaneers during the 2024 NFL draft.

After beginning the season as the No. 2 back to Rachaad White, Irving's role increased as the season progressed. In Week 6 against the New Orleans Saints, he had 105 scrimmage yards and a touchdown in the 51–27 win. In week 12, against the New York Giants, he had 152 scrimmage yards in the 30–7 win. In Week 13, he ran for 153 yards and one touchdown, along with three catches for 33 yards in a 26–23 win over the Carolina Panthers, earning NFC Offensive Player of the Week. In Week 15 against the Chargers, he had 15 carries for 117 rushing yards in the 40–17 win. In Week 17 against the Panthers, he had 190 scrimmage yards in the 48–14 win. He finished his rookie season with 207 carries for 1,122 rushing yards and eight rushing touchdowns to go with 47 receptions for 392 receiving yards. Irving was the first Buccaneers rookie to rush for at least 1,000 yards since Doug Martin in the 2012 season. In the Buccaneers NFC Wild Card game against the Washington Commanders, Irving rushed for 77 yards and scored a touchdown, setting a franchise record for most rushing yards in a single playoff game by a rookie.

On January 21, 2025, Irving was named to the 2024 PFWA NFL All-Rookie Team.

=== 2025 season ===
Irving began his sophomore season with a 23–20 win against the Atlanta Falcons in Week 1, carrying the ball 14 times for only 37 yards but recording a 9-yard TD catch. By Week 4, Irving had 237 yards on 71 carries along with two receiving touchdowns. He was scratched from play in Week 5 with both ankle and shoulder injuries. Irving remained out of the lineup until returning to play Week 13 against the Arizona Cardinals. Irving had 17 carries for 61 yards and a touchdown in his return.

== Career statistics ==
Legend
**Bold**	Career high

=== NFL ===
==== Regular season ====
Year	Team	Games		Rushing					Receiving					Fumbles	
Year	Team	GP	GS	Att	Yds	Avg	Lng	TD	Rec	Yds	Avg	Lng	TD	Fum	Lost
2024	TB	**17**	3	**207**	**1,122**	**5.4**	56	**8**	**47**	**392**	8.3	42	0	**2**	**1**
2025	TB	10	9	173	588	3.4	32	3	30	277	**9.2**	**72**	**3**	1	**1**
2026	TB	7	**7**	120	558	4.7	**72**	4	18	78	4.3	22	1	**2**	**1**
Career		34	19	500	2,268	4.5	72	13	95	747	7.9	72	4	5	3

==== Postseason ====
Year	Team	Games		Rushing					Receiving					Fumbles	
Year	Team	GP	GS	Att	Yds	Avg	Lng	TD	Rec	Yds	Avg	Lng	TD	Fum	Lost
2024	TB	1	1	17	77	4.5	19	0	2	6	3.0	4	1	0	0
Career		1	1	17	77	4.5	19	0	2	6	3.0	4	1	0	0

=== College ===
Year	Team	GP	Rushing				Receiving			
Year	Team	GP	Att	Yds	Avg	TD	Rec	Yds	Avg	TD
2021	Minnesota	12	133	699	5.3	4	8	73	9.1	0
2022	Oregon	13	156	1,058	**6.8**	5	31	299	**9.6**	**3**
2023	Oregon	14	**186**	**1,180**	6.3	**11**	**56**	**413**	7.4	2
Career		39	475	2,937	6.2	20	95	785	8.3	5
