= Ryan Miller (wide receiver) =

American football player (born 2000)

No. 11 – New England Patriots
- Position: Wide receiver
- Roster status: Practice squad

Personal information
- Born: February 20, 2000 (age 26); Jackson, Tennessee, U.S.
- Listed height: 6 ft 2 in (1.88 m)
- Listed weight: 221 lb (100 kg)

Career information
- High school: Jackson (TN)
- College: Furman (2018–2022)
- NFL draft: 2023: undrafted

Career history
- Tampa Bay Buccaneers (2023–2025); New York Giants (2025); Miami Dolphins (2026); New England Patriots (2026–present)*
- * Offseason or practice squad member only

Career NFL statistics as of Week 5, 2026
- Receptions: 17
- Receiving yards: 254
- Receiving touchdowns: 4
- Stats at Pro Football Reference

Ryan McKnight Miller (born February 20, 2000) is an American professional football wide receiver for the New England Patriots of the National Football League (NFL). He played college football for the Furman Paladins and was signed by the Buccaneers as an undrafted free agent in 2023. He previously played for the New York Giants and Miami Dolphins.

== Early life ==
Miller was born on February 20, 2000, in Jackson, Tennessee. His father and grandfather each played college baseball, while his other grandfather was a college tennis player and his mother a cheerleader. He attended the University School of Jackson where he played football and basketball and ran track; he was also a member of the school band. In football, Miller saw time at wide receiver, tight end, middle linebacker, running back and defensive end. A team captain, he was three times named all-district, twice was selected all-state and All-West Tennessee and totaled 69 receptions for 1,149 yards and eight touchdowns, along with 520 rushing yards and 10 touchdowns, as a senior, capping off a career in which he caught 82 passes for 1,529 yards and 18 touchdowns. A two-star recruit, he committed to play college football for the Furman Paladins over four other offers.

== College career ==
Miller appeared in nine games, one as a starter, as a true freshman at Furman in 2018, recording 10 receptions for 144 yards. He then started 11 games in 2019 and made 11 receptions for 237 yards and three touchdowns. He was named first-team All-American by Associated Press (AP) in the COVID-19-impacted 2020 season while having 15 catches for 254 yards and six touchdowns in seven games, also receiving first-team All-Southern Conference (SoCon) honors. Miller repeated as an All-American selection and first-team All-SoCon choice in 2021, being a top FCS tight end with 43 receptions for 749 yards and seven scores, placing third in the conference in yards per catch, touchdown catches and receiving yards. In his final year, 2022, Miller had a second-straight year as Furman's leading receiver with 72 catches for 762 yards and 12 touchdowns. He earned another all-conference and All-American selection, setting the school record in single-season and career touchdown catches while being the first three-time All-American in Furman history.

== Professional career ==
Pre-draft measurables
Height	Weight	Arm length	Hand span	Wingspan	40-yard dash	10-yard split	20-yard split	20-yard shuttle	Three-cone drill	Vertical jump	Broad jump
6 ft 1 1/4 in (1.86 m)	210 lb (95 kg)	30 1/2 in (0.77 m)	9 1/8 in (0.23 m)	6 ft 1 1/2 in (1.87 m)	4.52 s	1.62 s	2.63 s	4.27 s	6.84 s	32.0 in (0.81 m)	10 ft 2 in (3.10 m)
All values from Pro Day

=== Tampa Bay Buccaneers ===
Miller converted from tight end to wide receiver prior to the 2023 NFL draft. After going unselected in the draft, he was signed by the Tampa Bay Buccaneers as an undrafted free agent. He was released at the final roster cuts on August 29 and subsequently re-signed to the practice squad. He was elevated to the active roster for the team's Week 13 game against the Carolina Panthers and made his NFL debut in the 21–18 win. He signed a reserve/future contract on January 23, 2024.

Miller was waived by the Buccaneers on August 27, 2024, and re-signed to the practice squad. He was promoted to the active roster on October 23. On November 4, in a game against the Kansas City Chiefs, Miller scored his first career touchdown, a one-yard pass from quarterback Baker Mayfield. On December 22, playing against the Dallas Cowboys, Miller scored his second career touchdown on a 13-yard pass from Mayfield, putting his career NFL receiving total at over 100 yards.

On September 15, 2025, Miller caught a 20-yard touchdown pass from Mayfield in the Buccaneers 20-19 win over the Houston Texans. On December 10, he was waived.

=== New York Giants ===
On December 11, 2025, Miller was claimed off waivers by the New York Giants.

On April 7, 2026, Miller re-signed with the Giants. On August 24, Miller was waived by New York.

=== Miami Dolphins ===
On August 25, 2026, Miller was claimed off waivers by the Miami Dolphins. On October 13, Miller was waived.

=== New England Patriots ===
On October 19, 2026, Miller was signed to the New England Patriots practice squad.
