= 2021 Tampa Bay Buccaneers season =

46th season in franchise history

- Owner: The Glazer family
- General manager: Jason Licht
- Head coach: Bruce Arians
- Home stadium: Raymond James Stadium

Results
- Record: 13–4
- Division place: 1st NFC South
- Playoffs: Won Wild Card Playoffs (vs. Eagles) 31–15; Lost Divisional Playoffs (vs. Rams) 27–30
- All-Pros: 2: RT Tristan Wirfs (1st team); QB Tom Brady (2nd team)
- Pro Bowlers: 9: QB Tom Brady; WR Mike Evans; T Tristan Wirfs; G Ali Marpet; C Ryan Jensen; DT Vita Vea; OLB Shaquil Barrett; MLB Devin White; FS Antoine Winfield Jr.

Uniform
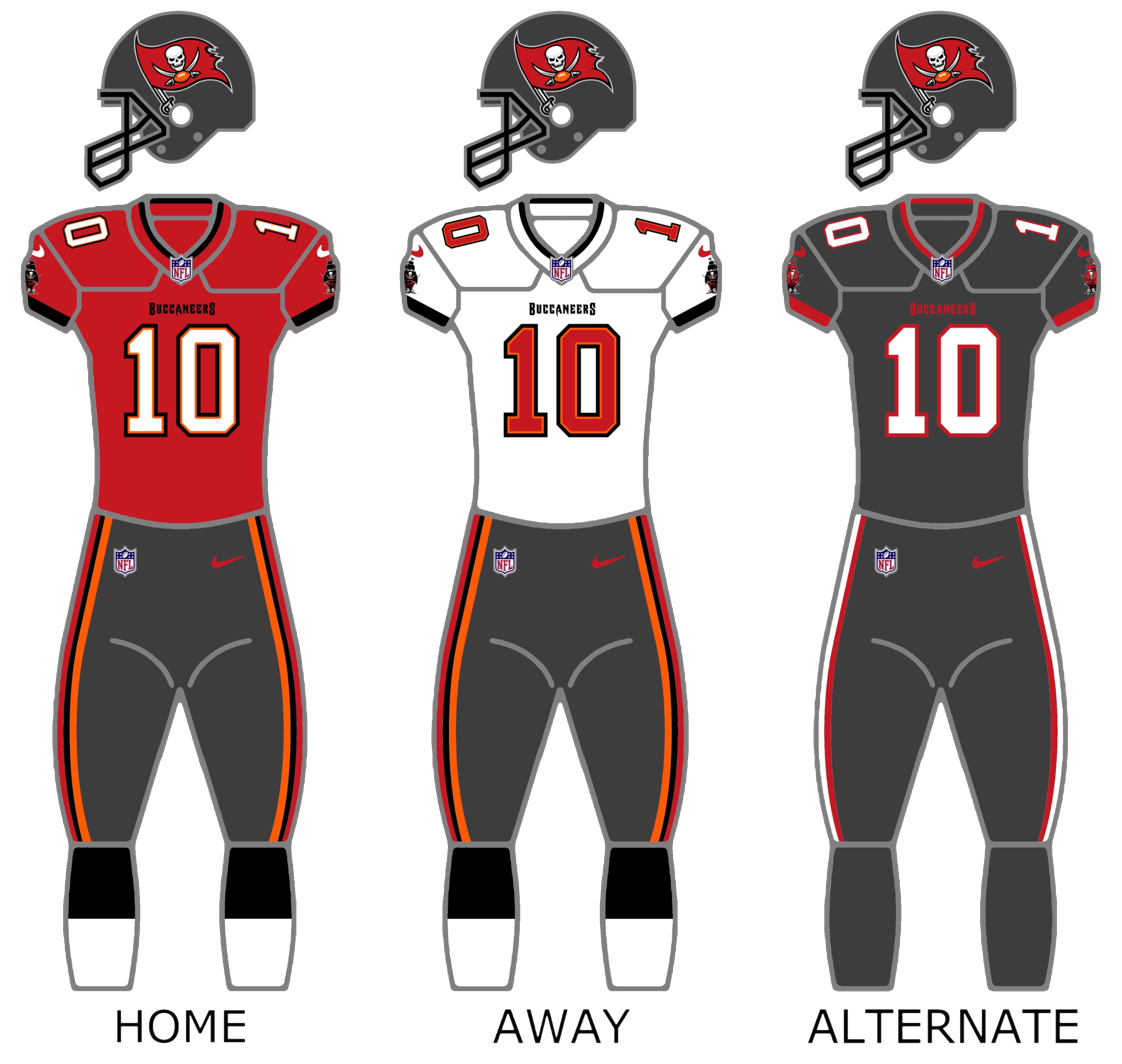

The 2021 season was the Tampa Bay Buccaneers' 46th season in the National Football League (NFL) and their third and final season under head coach Bruce Arians. They entered the season as defending Super Bowl champions and were attempting to become the first club to win consecutive Super Bowls since the team's quarterback Tom Brady did so with New England in XXXVIII and XXXIX along with being the first NFC club to do so since the Dallas Cowboys did in 1992 and 1993. They entered the season riding a franchise record eight consecutive wins (including regular season and playoffs), which they extended to ten wins until they lost to the Rams. This was the first of four consecutive NFC South titles for the Buccaneers. After their Week 16 win over Carolina, the Buccaneers clinched the NFC South division for the first time since 2007. Tampa Bay won a franchise record 13 games in the regular season. In Week 18, they secured the #2 seed in the NFC playoffs, then defeated the Philadelphia Eagles 31–15 in the Wild Card Round, notching postseason wins in consecutive seasons for the first time. However, their title defense came to an end with a 30–27 last-second loss to the eventual Super Bowl champion Los Angeles Rams in the Divisional Round.

The Buccaneers became the first team in the NFL's salary cap era to have all 22 starters from their Super Bowl championship team re-signed or under contract for the upcoming season. During the regular season, quarterback Tom Brady in addition to extending several ongoing records, set new individual NFL records for most career starts, most career passing yards, most career pass completions, and became the first player to achieve 600 career touchdown passes. A rash of injuries, however, put several starters on injured reserve, including Chris Godwin and Richard Sherman. In addition, key weapons Rob Gronkowski, Ronald Jones, Leonard Fournette, Lavonte David, and Tristan Wirfs and others, all missed playing time dealing with various injuries. Then in Week 17, Antonio Brown abruptly quit the team mid-game in a high-publicized incident.

Following the season on February 1, 2022, quarterback Tom Brady announced his retirement from the league. Brady had one season remaining on his contract with the Buccaneers. However, on March 13, he retracted his retirement plans, and announced he would return in 2022. Head coach Bruce Arians also announced his retirement following the season and shifted to a Senior Football Consultant. It was also the 2nd with Rob Gronkowski on the roster as well as his 11th and final season of his NFL career, as he announced his retirement for a second time on June 21, 2022, via an Instagram post.

== Offseason ==
=== Free agents ===
Position	Player	Tag	Outcome	Date	Notes	Ref
S	Andrew Adams	UFA	Philadelphia Eagles	March 18	1-year deal worth $1.1M	
TE	Antony Auclair	UFA	Houston Texans	April 7	1-year deal worth $1.1M	
RB	Kenjon Barner	UFA				
OLB	Shaquil Barrett	UFA	Tampa Bay Buccaneers	March 17	4-year deal worth $72M	
WR	Antonio Brown	UFA	Tampa Bay Buccaneers	May 25	1-year deal worth $6.25M	
ILB	Deone Bucannon	UFA				
ILB	Jack Cichy	RFA				
CB	Ross Cockrell	UFA	Tampa Bay Buccaneers	April 13	1-year deal worth $990K	
LB	Lavonte David	UFA	Tampa Bay Buccaneers	March 12	2-year deal worth $25M	
RB	Leonard Fournette	UFA	Tampa Bay Buccaneers	March 26	1-year deal worth $3.25M	
QB	Blaine Gabbert	UFA	Tampa Bay Buccaneers	May 5	1-year deal worth $2.5M	
WR	Chris Godwin	UFA	Tampa Bay Buccaneers	March 9	Franchise tag worth $15.9M	
QB	Ryan Griffin	UFA	Tampa Bay Buccaneers	April 20	1-year deal worth $1.212M	
TE	Rob Gronkowski	UFA	Tampa Bay Buccaneers	March 22	1-year deal worth $8M	
OT	Joe Haeg	UFA	Pittsburgh Steelers	March 21	2-year deal worth $4.6M	
TE	Tanner Hudson	ERFA	Tampa Bay Buccaneers	March 9	1-year deal worth $920K	
DE	Jeremiah Ledbetter	ERFA	Tampa Bay Buccaneers	March 9	1-year deal worth $850K	
RB	T. J. Logan	UFA				
RB	LeSean McCoy	UFA	Retired			
NT	Steve McLendon	UFA	Tampa Bay Buccaneers	April 14	1-year deal worth $1.075M	
ILB	Kevin Minter	UFA	Tampa Bay Buccaneers	March 20	1-year deal worth $1.2M	
NT	Rakeem Nunez-Roches	UFA	Tampa Bay Buccaneers	March 20	2-year deal worth $5M	
DE	Pat O'Connor	ERFA	Tampa Bay Buccaneers	March 8	1-year deal worth $920K	
CB	Ryan Smith	UFA	Los Angeles Chargers	March 31	1-year deal worth $1.5M	
G	Aaron Stinnie	RFA	Tampa Bay Buccaneers	March 17	1-year deal worth $1M and roster bonus of $250K	
K	Ryan Succop	UFA	Tampa Bay Buccaneers	March 17	3-year deal worth $12M	
DE	Ndamukong Suh	UFA	Tampa Bay Buccaneers	March 24	1-year deal worth $9M	
LS	Zach Triner	ERFA	Tampa Bay Buccaneers	March 9	1-year deal worth $850K	
T	Josh Wells	UFA	Tampa Bay Buccaneers	March 25	1-year deal worth $1.1M	

Player re-signed by the Buccaneers	Player not re-signed by the Buccaneers

=== Signings ===
Position	Player	Previous team	Date signed	Contract
RB	Giovani Bernard	Cincinnati Bengals	April 14, 2021	1 year, $1.2M
CB	Richard Sherman	San Francisco 49ers	September 29, 2021	1 year, $2.25M

Indicates that the player was a free agent at the end of his respective team's 2020 season.

=== Draft ===
2021 Tampa Bay Buccaneers draft
Round	Selection	Player	Position	College	Notes
1	32	Joe Tryon-Shoyinka	OLB	Washington	
2	64	Kyle Trask	QB	Florida	
3	95	Robert Hainsey	OT	Notre Dame	
4	129	Jaelon Darden	WR	North Texas	from Seattle
5	176	K. J. Britt	ILB	Auburn	
7	251	Chris Wilcox	CB	BYU	from Pittsburgh
7	259	Grant Stuard	OLB	Houston	

Notes

- The Buccaneers were awarded a compensatory selection in the sixth round (217th overall).
- The Buccaneers traded a sixth-round selection (216th overall) to Pittsburgh for offensive tackle Jerald Hawkins and a seventh-round selection (251st overall).
- The Buccaneers traded their fourth-round (137th overall) and sixth-round (compensatory/217th overall) selections to Seattle for a fourth-round selection (129th overall)

== Staff ==
2021 Tampa Bay Buccaneers staff
Front office: Co-owner/co-chairman – Bryan Glazer; Co-owner/co-chairman – Edward Glazer; Co-owner/co-chairman – Joel Glazer; Co-owner/president – Darcie Glazer Kassewitz; Co-owner – Avram Glazer; Co-owner – Kevin Glazer; General manager – Jason Licht; Vice president of player personnel – John Spytek; Director of football operations – Shelton Quarles; Vice president of football administration – Mike Greenberg; Director of player personnel – Mike Biehl; Director of pro scouting – Rob McCartney; Assistant director of pro scouting – Shane Scannell and Alex Smith; Senior national scout – Byron Kiefer; Vice president of player engagement – Duke Preston; Head coaches: Head coach – Bruce Arians; Assistant head coach/Run game coordinator – Harold Goodwin; Assistant to the head coach – Mike Chiurco; Offensive coaches: Offensive coordinator – Byron Leftwich; Quarterbacks – Clyde Christensen; Running backs – Todd McNair; Wide receivers – Kevin Garver; Tight ends – Rick Christophel; Offensive line – Joe Gilbert; Offensive assistant – Thad Lewis; Offensive assistant – A.Q. Shipley; Offensive quality control – John Van Dam; Offensive consultant – Tom Moore	Defensive coaches: Defensive coordinator – Todd Bowles; Defensive line – Kacy Rodgers; Assistant defensive line – Lori Locust; Outside linebackers – Larry Foote; Inside linebackers – Mike Caldwell; Cornerbacks – Kevin Ross; Safeties – Nick Rapone; Defensive/special teams assistant – Cody Grimm; Defensive quality control – Tim Atkins; Special teams coaches: Special teams coordinator – Keith Armstrong; Assistant special teams coach – Keith Tandy; Specialists – Chris Boniol; Strength and conditioning: Head strength and conditioning – Anthony Piroli; Speed and conditioning – Roger Kingdom; Assistant strength and conditioning – Michael Stacchiotti; Assistant strength and conditioning – Chad Wade; Assistant strength and conditioning – Maral Javadifar

== Final roster ==
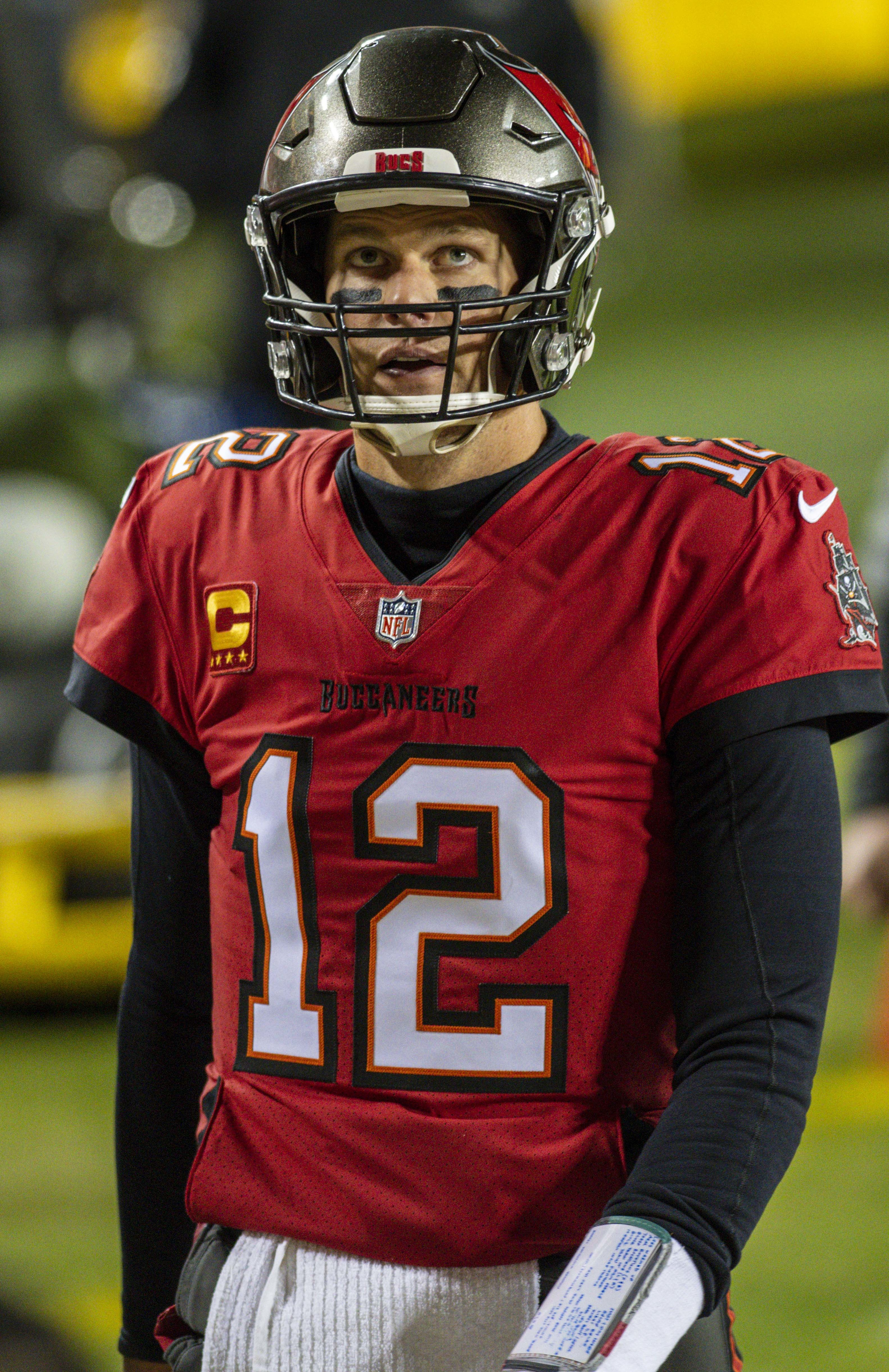
Quarterback Tom Brady.

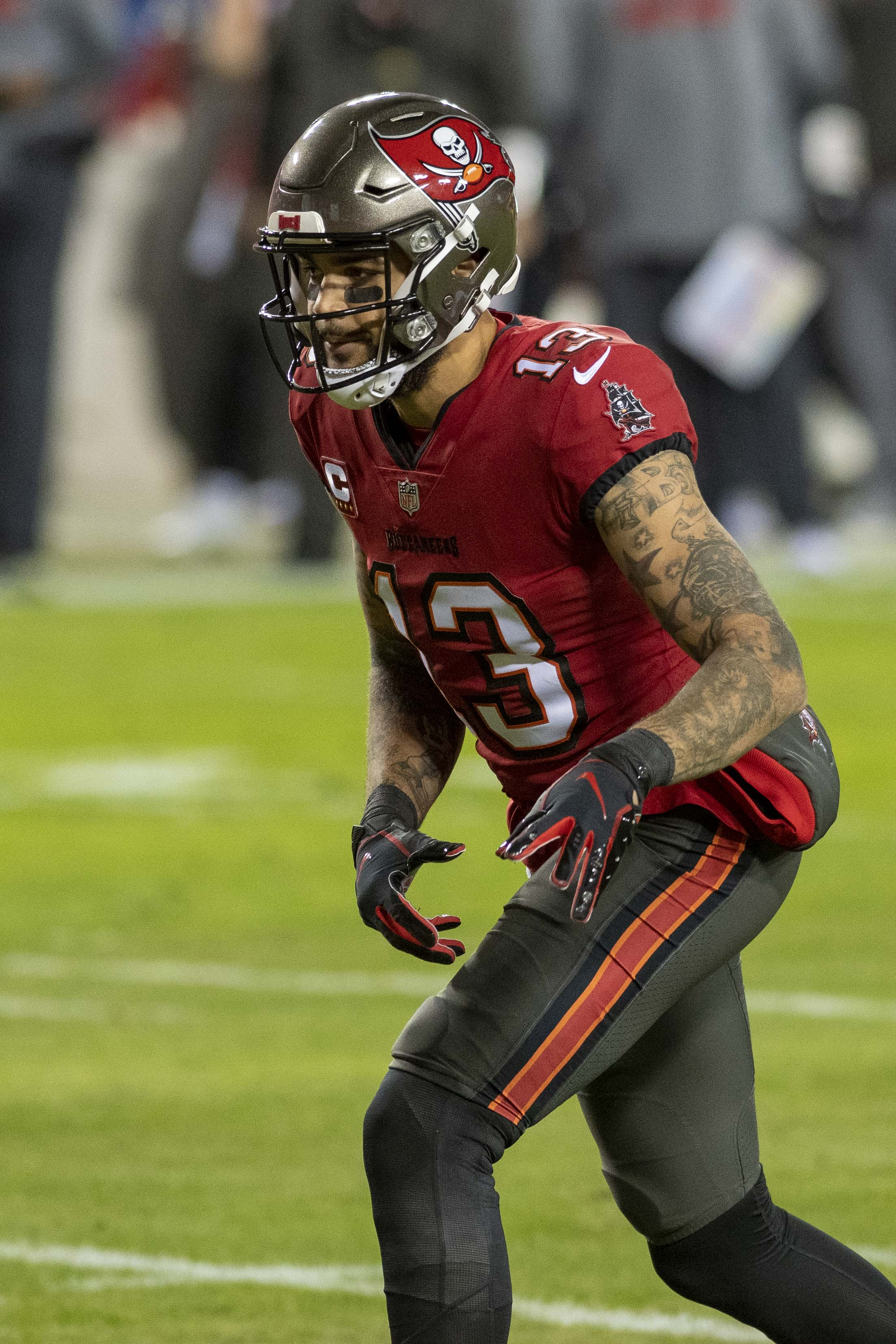
Wide receiver Mike Evans.

2021 Tampa Bay Buccaneers roster
Quarterbacks (QB): 12 Tom Brady; 11 Blaine Gabbert; 4 Ryan Griffin; 2 Kyle Trask; Running backs (RB): 25 Giovani Bernard; 7 Leonard Fournette; 27 Ronald Jones II; 21 Ke'Shawn Vaughn; Wide receivers (WR): 89 John Brown; 1 Jaelon Darden; 13 Mike Evans; 15 Cyril Grayson; 18 Tyler Johnson; 10 Scotty Miller; 16 Breshad Perriman; Tight ends (TE): 84 Cameron Brate; 87 Rob Gronkowski; 80 O. J. Howard	Offensive linemen (OL): 65 Alex Cappa G; 70 Robert Hainsey T; 66 Ryan Jensen C; 60 Nick Leverett G; 74 Ali Marpet G; 76 Donovan Smith T; 64 Aaron Stinnie G; 72 Josh Wells T; 78 Tristan Wirfs T; Defensive linemen (DL): 92 William Gholston DE; 96 Steve McLendon NT; 56 Rakeem Nuñez-Roches NT; 93 Ndamukong Suh DE; 50 Vita Vea NT	Linebackers (LB): 58 Shaquil Barrett OLB; 52 K. J. Britt ILB; 54 Lavonte David ILB; 49 Cam Gill OLB; 51 Kevin Minter ILB; 98 Anthony Nelson OLB; 90 Jason Pierre-Paul OLB; 48 Grant Stuard ILB; 9 Joe Tryon-Shoyinka OLB; 45 Devin White ILB; Defensive backs (DB): 26 Andrew Adams SS; 43 Ross Cockrell CB; 24 Carlton Davis CB; 35 Jamel Dean CB; 30 Dee Delaney CB; 29 Pierre Desir CB; 32 Mike Edwards FS; 23 Sean Murphy-Bunting CB; 33 Jordan Whitehead SS; 31 Antoine Winfield Jr. FS; Special teams (ST): 8 Bradley Pinion P; 3 Ryan Succop K; 97 Zach Triner LS	Practice squad: 38 Kenjon Barner RB; 19 José Borregales K; 88 Darren Fells TE; 83 John Hurst WR; 86 Codey McElroy TE; 75 John Molchon G; 44 Elijah Ponder OLB; 91 Benning Potoa'e DE; 94 Willington Previlon DE; 28 Rashard Robinson CB; 71 Kobe Smith DE; 73 Brandon Walton T; 22 Troy Warner SS; 17 Justin Watson WR; Reserve: 14 Chris Godwin WR (IR); 61 Sadarius Hutcherson G (IR); 79 Pat O'Connor DE (IR); 39 Curtis Riley SS (IR); 5 Richard Sherman CB (IR); -- Donell Stanley C (IR); Rookies in italics 53 active, 6 reserve, 16 practice squad

== Preseason ==
Tampa Bay's preseason schedule was announced on May 12. With the expansion of the regular season, the preseason was reduced from four to three games.

Week	Date	Opponent	Result	Record	Venue	Recap
1	August 14	Cincinnati Bengals	L 14–19	0–1	Raymond James Stadium	Recap
2	August 21	Tennessee Titans	L 3–34	0–2	Raymond James Stadium	Recap
3	August 28	at Houston Texans	W 23–16	1–2	NRG Stadium	Recap

== Regular season ==
=== Schedule ===
The Buccaneers' 2021 schedule was announced on May 12. As defending Super Bowl champions, the Buccaneers hosted the 2021 NFL Kickoff Game at Raymond James Stadium against the Dallas Cowboys.

Week	Date	Opponent	Result	Record	Venue	Recap
1	September 9	Dallas Cowboys	**W** 31–29	1–0	Raymond James Stadium	Recap
2	September 19	**Atlanta Falcons**	**W** 48–25	2–0	Raymond James Stadium	Recap
3	September 26	at Los Angeles Rams	**L** 24–34	2–1	SoFi Stadium	Recap
4	October 3	at New England Patriots	**W** 19–17	3–1	Gillette Stadium	Recap
5	October 10	Miami Dolphins	**W** 45–17	4–1	Raymond James Stadium	Recap
6	October 14	at Philadelphia Eagles	**W** 28–22	5–1	Lincoln Financial Field	Recap
7	October 24	Chicago Bears	**W** 38–3	6–1	Raymond James Stadium	Recap
8	October 31	at **New Orleans Saints**	**L** 27–36	6–2	Caesars Superdome	Recap
9	Bye					
10	November 14	at Washington Football Team	**L** 19–29	6–3	FedExField	Recap
11	November 22	New York Giants	**W** 30–10	7–3	Raymond James Stadium	Recap
12	November 28	at Indianapolis Colts	**W** 38–31	8–3	Lucas Oil Stadium	Recap
13	December 5	at **Atlanta Falcons**	**W** 30–17	9–3	Mercedes-Benz Stadium	Recap
14	December 12	Buffalo Bills	**W** 33–27 (OT)	10–3	Raymond James Stadium	Recap
15	December 19	**New Orleans Saints**	**L** 0–9	10–4	Raymond James Stadium	Recap
16	December 26	at **Carolina Panthers**	**W** 32–6	11–4	Bank of America Stadium	Recap
17	January 2	at New York Jets	**W** 28–24	12–4	MetLife Stadium	Recap
18	January 9	**Carolina Panthers**	**W** 41–17	13–4	Raymond James Stadium	Recap

Note: Intra-division opponents are in bold text.

=== Game summaries ===
==== Week 1: vs. Dallas Cowboys ====
NFL Kickoff Game

Week 1: Dallas Cowboys at Tampa Bay Buccaneers – Game summary

Quarter	1	2	3	4	Total
Cowboys	7	9	10	3	**29**
**Buccaneers**	7	14	7	3	**31**

at Raymond James Stadium, Tampa, Florida

- Date: September 9
- Game time: 8:20 p.m. EDT
- Game weather: Cloudy, 81 °F (27 °C)
- Game attendance: 65,566
- Referee: Shawn Hochuli
- TV announcers (NBC/Peacock): Al Michaels, Cris Collinsworth, Michele Tafoya and Terry McAulay
- Recap, Game Book

Game information

**First quarter**

- TB – Chris Godwin 5-yard pass from Tom Brady (Ryan Succop kick), 5:23. Buccaneers 7–0. **Drive: 9 plays, 94 yards, 4:09**
- DAL – CeeDee Lamb 22-yard pass from Dak Prescott (Greg Zuerlein kick), 1:35. Tied 7–7. **Drive: 7 plays, 75 yards, 3:48**

**Second quarter**

- TB – Rob Gronkowski 2-yard pass from Tom Brady (Ryan Succop kick), 9:48. Buccaneers 14–7. **Drive: 6 plays, 50 yards, 2:53**
- DAL – Amari Cooper 5-yard pass from Dak Prescott (kick failed), 4:12. Buccaneers 14–13. **Drive: 5 plays, 27 yards, 2:08**
- DAL – Greg Zuerlein 35-yard field goal, 3:16. Cowboys 16–14. **Drive: 4 plays, 4 yards, 0:52**
- TB – Antonio Brown 47-yard pass from Tom Brady (Ryan Succop kick), 2:38. Buccaneers 21–16. **Drive: 2 plays, 57 yards, 0:38**

**Third quarter**

- DAL – Greg Zuerlein 21-yard field goal, 9:15. Buccaneers 21–19. **Drive: 13 plays, 72 yards, 5:45**
- TB – Rob Gronkowski 11-yard pass from Tom Brady (Ryan Succop kick), 6:23. Buccaneers 28–19. **Drive: 4 plays, 35 yards, 2:08**
- DAL – Amari Cooper 21-yard pass from Dak Prescott (Greg Zuerlein kick), 0:33. Buccaneers 28–26. **Drive: 10 plays, 75 yards, 5:50**

**Fourth quarter**

- DAL – Greg Zuerlein 48-yard field goal, 1:29. Cowboys 29–28. **Drive: 11 plays, 60 yards, 3:28**
- TB – Ryan Succop 36-yard field goal, 0:02. Buccaneers 31–29. **Drive: 11 plays, 57 yards, 1:22**

**Top passers**

- DAL – Dak Prescott – 42/58, 403 yards, 3 TD, INT
- TB – Tom Brady – 32/50, 379 yards, 4 TD, 2 INT

**Top rushers**

- DAL – Ezekiel Elliott – 11 rushes, 33 yards
- TB – Leonard Fournette – 9 rushes, 32 yards

**Top receivers**

- DAL – Amari Cooper – 13 receptions, 139 yards, 2 TD
- TB – Antonio Brown – 5 receptions, 121 yards, TD

Tampa Bay hosted Dallas in the Thursday night Kickoff Game. The Buccaneers overcame four turnovers to defeat the Cowboys 31–29. Quarterback Tom Brady threw for 379 yards and four touchdown passes in his NFL record 300th career regular season start. During pregame ceremonies, the Buccaneers unveiled new stadium decorations celebrating their victories in Super Bowl XXXVII and Super Bowl LV.

Tampa Bay received the opening kickoff, but went three-and-out to start the game. Bradley Pinion executed a coffin corner punt, pinning the Cowboys back at their own 2-yard line. Tampa Bay got the ball back after a Dallas punt. Tom Brady connected with passes to Mike Evans, Rob Gronkowski and Antonio Brown, and capped off the drive with a 5-yard touchdown pass to Chris Godwin for a 7–0 early lead.

Tampa Bay broke a 7–7 tie with a 2-yard touchdown pass from Brady to Gronkowski. The drive was set up after a long punt return by Jaydon Mickens. Dallas trimmed the score to 14–13 after a touchdown from Dak Prescott to Amari Cooper. Tom Brady's first interception of the night led to a Cowboys field goal. But on their next drive, Brady connected with a wide open Antonio Brown for a 47-yard touchdown, and a 21–16 halftime lead.

The Cowboys opened up the second half with a lengthy field goal drive, to make the score 21–19. Carlton Davis intercepted Dak Prescott, which set up Gronkowski's second touchdown catch. But the Cowboys responded with a 10-play, 75-yard drive, culminating in a 21-yard touchdown catch by Amari Cooper, his second of the day as well.

Tampa Bay clung to a 28–26 lead entering the fourth quarter. With 5:04 left, the Buccaneers were driving at the Dallas 13-yard line. Brady's short pass to Chris Godwin was caught but subsequently fumbled at the 2-yard line and recovered by the Cowboys. The Cowboys drove down the field for a 48-yard go-ahead field goal by Greg Zuerlein. With only one timeout left, trailing 29–28 with 1:24 remaining in regulation, Brady drove the Buccaneers 57 yards in eleven plays, down to the Cowboys 18-yard line. Ryan Succop kicked a game-winning 36-yard field goal with 7 seconds left. The Buccaneers extended their franchise-record winning streak (including postseason) to 9 games.

Two of Brady's touchdown passes were to Rob Gronkowski, bringing the duo's career total to 100 touchdown connections in the regular season and playoffs combined.

==== Week 2: vs. Atlanta Falcons ====
Week 2: Atlanta Falcons at Tampa Bay Buccaneers – Game summary

Quarter	1	2	3	4	Total
Falcons	0	10	15	0	**25**
**Buccaneers**	7	14	7	20	**48**

at Raymond James Stadium, Tampa, Florida

- Date: September 19
- Game time: 4:05 p.m. EDT
- Game weather: Cloudy, 83 °F (28 °C)
- Game attendance: 63,694
- Referee: Carl Cheffers
- TV announcers (Fox): Kevin Burkhardt, Greg Olsen and Pam Oliver
- Recap, Game Book

Game information

**First quarter**

- TB – Rob Gronkowski 20-yard pass from Tom Brady (Ryan Succop kick), 12:22. Buccaneers 7–0. **Drive: 6 plays, 75 yards, 2:38**

**Second quarter**

- TB – Rob Gronkowski 1-yard pass from Tom Brady (Ryan Succop kick), 14:07. Buccaneers 14–0. **Drive: 5 plays, 46 yards, 1:54**
- ATL – Cordarrelle Patterson 10-yard run (Younghoe Koo kick), 11:48. Buccaneers 14–7. **Drive: 5 plays, 66 yards, 2:19**
- TB – Mike Evans 3-yard pass from Tom Brady (Ryan Succop kick), 0:43. Buccaneers 21–7. **Drive: 8 plays, 85 yards, 3:31**
- ATL – Younghoe Koo 36-yard field goal, 0:00. Buccaneers 21–10. **Drive: 4 plays, 47 yards, 0:43**

**Third quarter**

- TB – Mike Evans 1-yard pass from Tom Brady (Ryan Succop kick), 12:43. Buccaneers 28–10. **Drive: 4 plays, 18 yards, 1:36**
- ATL – Calvin Ridley 3-yard pass from Matt Ryan (Younghoe Koo kick), 6:35. Buccaneers 28–17. **Drive: 13 plays, 75 yards, 6:08**
- ATL – Cordarrelle Patterson 7-yard pass from Matt Ryan (Matt Ryan run), 1:45. Buccaneers 28–25. **Drive: 6 plays, 46 yards, 2:56**

**Fourth quarter**

- TB – Chris Godwin 12-yard pass from Tom Brady (Ryan Succop kick), 9:18. Buccaneers 35–25. **Drive: 3 plays, 43 yards, 1:35**
- TB – Mike Edwards 31-yard interception return (kick failed), 7:53. Buccaneers 41–25.
- TB – Mike Edwards 15-yard interception return (Ryan Succop kick), 4:01. Buccaneers 48–25.

**Top passers**

- ATL – Matt Ryan – 35/46, 300 yards, 2 TD, 3 INT
- TB – Tom Brady – 24/36, 276 yards, 5 TD

**Top rushers**

- ATL – Mike Davis – 9 rushes, 38 yards
- TB – Leonard Fournette – 11 rushes, 52 yards

**Top receivers**

- ATL – Kyle Pitts – 5 receptions, 73 yards
- TB – Mike Evans – 5 receptions, 76 yards, 2 TD

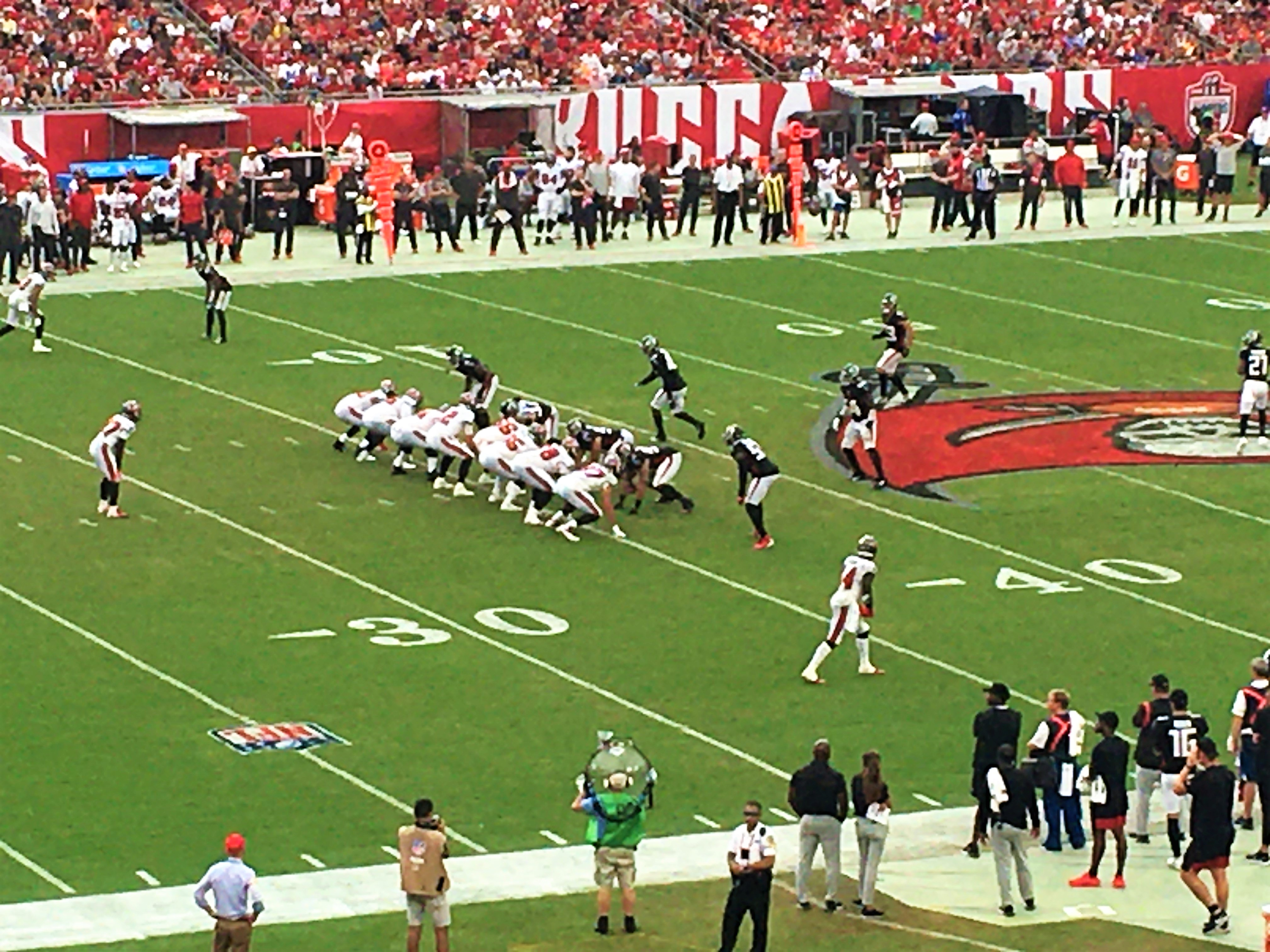
Game action between Tampa Bay and Atlanta.

Quarterback Tom Brady threw for 276 yards and 5 touchdown passes (tying a franchise best) as Tampa Bay defeated Atlanta 48–25. The Buccaneers extended their franchise record winning streak to ten games, and became the first NFL team to score 30+ points in a victorious performance in nine consecutive games.

The Buccaneers won the coin toss and elected to receive. With potential rain in the forecast for the second half, coach Bruce Arians indicated he wanted the offense to hit the field first. Tampa Bay built a 14–0 lead in the first half after two touchdown passes to Rob Gronkowski. A touchdown pass to Mike Evans late in the second quarter set Tampa Bay up for a 21–10 lead.

Atlanta received the kickoff for the second half. On the second play of the third quarter, Matt Ryan was intercepted by Shaquil Barrett, setting the Buccaneers up at the Atlanta 18-yard line. Five plays later, Evans caught his second touchdown pass, and Tampa Bay pulled out to a 28–10 lead. Atlanta rallied, scoring two touchdowns and trimmed the deficit to 28–25 by the end of the third quarter.

Tampa Bay pinned the Falcons back at their own 4-yard line. The defense forced a three-and-out, and the resulting punt gave the Buccaneers excellent field position. Brady threw three straight passes, and Chris Godwin's touchdown grab put the Buccaneers up 35–25 with 9 minutes left in regulation. The Buccaneers defense sealed the game as Mike Edwards twice picked off Matt Ryan and returned both interceptions for touchdowns.

==== Week 3: at Los Angeles Rams ====
Week 3: Tampa Bay Buccaneers at Los Angeles Rams – Game summary

Quarter	1	2	3	4	Total
Buccaneers	0	7	10	7	**24**
**Rams**	0	14	17	3	**34**

at SoFi Stadium, Inglewood, California

- Date: September 26
- Game time: 4:25 p.m. EDT/1:25 p.m. PDT
- Game weather: Cloudy, 68 °F (20 °C)
- Game attendance: 73,205
- Referee: Craig Wrolstad
- TV announcers (Fox): Joe Buck, Troy Aikman, Erin Andrews and Tom Rinaldi
- Recap, Game Book

Game information

**First quarter**

- **No scoring plays.**

**Second quarter**

- LA – Tyler Higbee 6-yard pass from Matthew Stafford (Matt Gay kick), 12:22. Rams 7–0. **Drive: 14 plays, 95 yards, 8:05.**
- TB – Chris Godwin 2-yard rush (Ryan Succop kick), 4:03 Tied 7–7. **Drive: 15 plays, 76 yards, 8:19.**
- LA – Cooper Kupp 2-yard pass from Matthew Stafford (Matt Gay kick), 0:51. Rams 14–7. **Drive: 10 plays, 69 yards, 3:12.**

**Third quarter**

- LA – DeSean Jackson 75-yard pass from Matthew Stafford (Matt Gay kick), 14:02. Rams 21–7. **Drive: 3 plays, 75 yards, 0:58.**
- TB – Tom Brady 1-yard rush (Ryan Succop kick), 9:57. Rams 21–14. **Drive: 9 plays, 75 yards, 4:05.**
- LA – Copper Kupp 10-yard pass from Matthew Stafford (Matt Gay kick), 7:23. Rams 28–14. **Drive: 7 plays, 75 yards, 2:34.**
- LA – Matt Gay 47-yard field goal, 3:09. Rams 31–14. **Drive: 4 plays, 7 yards, 1:15.**
- TB – Ryan Succop 26-yard field goal, 1:14. Rams 31–17. **Drive: 8 plays, 67 yards, 1:55.**

**Fourth quarter**

- LA – Matt Gay 26-yard field goal, 8:14 Rams 34–17. **Drive: 13 plays, 67 yards, 8:00.**
- TB – Giovani Bernard 7-yard pass from Tom Brady (Ryan Succop kick), 1:10. Rams 34–24. **Drive: 14 plays, 88 yards, 3:40.**

**Top passers**

- TB – Tom Brady – 41/55, 432 yards, TD
- LA – Matthew Stafford – 27/38, 343 yards, 4 TD

**Top rushers**

- TB – Tom Brady – 3 rushes, 14 yards, TD
- LA – Sony Michel – 20 rushes, 67 yards

**Top receivers**

- TB – Mike Evans – 6 receptions, 106 yards
- LA – DeSean Jackson – 3 receptions, 120 yards, TD

Tampa Bay snapped a ten-game winning streak, losing their first game of the 2021 season at the Los Angeles Rams. Quarterback Tom Brady threw for 432 yards, one touchdown pass, and ran for a touchdown, but the Buccaneers defense could not contain Matthew Stafford and the high-powered Rams offense. Despite the loss, Brady became the second player in NFL history to pass for over 80,000 career yards.

After a scoreless first quarter, the Rams led 14–7 late in the first half. Tampa Bay drove into Rams territory, but had to settle for a field goal attempt. Ryan Succop's 55-yard attempt sailed wide right, and the Rams led at halftime 14–7. The Buccaneers rushing offense was ineffective in the first half, producing only 18 yards on 9 carries.

The Rams put the game out of reach in the second half. They scored on four straight drives to build a 34–17 lead. Brady's second touchdown pass trimmed the deficit to 34–24 with just over one minute left in regulation. The ensuing onside kick attempt failed, and the Rams held on for the win.

==== Week 4: at New England Patriots ====
Week 4: Tampa Bay Buccaneers at New England Patriots – Game summary

Quarter	1	2	3	4	Total
**Buccaneers**	3	3	7	6	**19**
Patriots	0	7	0	10	**17**

at Gillette Stadium, Foxborough, Massachusetts

- Date: October 3
- Game time: 8:20 p.m. EDT
- Game weather: Rain, 61 °F (16 °C)
- Game attendance: 65,878
- Referee: Bill Vinovich
- TV announcers (NBC): Al Michaels, Cris Collinsworth, Michele Tafoya and Terry McAulay
- Recap, Game Book

Game information

**First quarter**

- TB – Ryan Succop 45-yard field goal, 4:49. Buccaneers 3–0. **Drive: 10 plays, 71 yards, 3:53.**

**Second quarter**

- NE – Hunter Henry 11-yard pass from Mac Jones (Nick Folk kick), 8:28. Patriots 7–3. **Drive: 11 plays, 74 yards, 6:21.**
- TB – Ryan Succop 44-yard field goal, 0:13. Patriots 7–6. **Drive: 8 plays, 69 yards, 1:36.**

**Third quarter**

- TB – Ronald Jones II 8-yard run (Ryan Succop kick), 3:29. Buccaneers 13–7. **Drive: 8 plays, 52 yards, 3:48.**

**Fourth quarter**

- NE – Jonnu Smith 1-yard pass from Mac Jones (Nick Folk kick), 14:57. Patriots 14–13. **Drive: 7 plays, 77 yards, 3:32.**
- TB – Ryan Succop 27-yard field goal, 7:58. Buccaneers 16–14. **Drive: 15 plays, 68 yards, 6:59.**
- NE – Nick Folk 27-yard field goal, 4:34. Patriots 17–16. **Drive: 8 plays, 66 yards, 3:24.**
- TB – Ryan Succop 48-yard field goal, 1:57. Buccaneers 19–17. **Drive: 7 plays, 45 yards, 2:37.**

**Top passers**

- TB – Tom Brady – 22/43, 269 yards
- NE – Mac Jones – 31/40, 275 yards, 2 TD, INT

**Top rushers**

- TB – Leonard Fournette – 20 rushes, 91 yards
- NE – Nelson Agholor – 1 rush, 4 yards

**Top receivers**

- TB – Mike Evans – 7 receptions, 75 yards
- NE – Jakobi Meyers – 8 receptions, 70 yards

Tampa Bay faced New England on Sunday Night Football in a game dubbed "The Return" by NBC Sports. The game marked Tom Brady's first game at Gillette Stadium since leaving the Patriots as a free agent after the 2019 season. Brady passed Drew Brees as the league's all-time career passing yardage leader, and Tampa Bay pulled off a come-from-behind victory to improve to 3–1 on the season. On a rainy night, Brady was warmly welcomed by the Patriots fanbase, but quickly their attention turned to rookie quarterback Mac Jones. Jones threw for 275 yards and two touchdown passes, and nearly led the Patriots to an upset victory. In a back and forth game, turnovers, the lack of a rushing attack, and ultimately a missed field goal, cost New England a chance to win.

The Buccaneers offense was average in the first half, outgaining the Patriots 227 yards to 129, but managed only six points. With Rob Gronkowski inactive due to a rib injury suffered the previous week, Tampa Bay struggled in the red zone. Ryan Succop gave Tampa Bay an early 3–0 lead, but missed another field goal attempt to start the second quarter. Jones then led the Patriots on a 11-play, 74-yard drive for the game's first touchdown. After trading punts, Brady drove the Buccaneers to the New England 26-yard line just before halftime. Dropped passes due to the wet conditions stalled the drive. Succop kicked a 44-yard field goal with 18 seconds left to make the score 7–6 at halftime.

Tampa Bay received the second half kickoff, but went three-and-out. The Patriots took over near midfield, but three plays into the drive, J. J. Taylor fumbled at the Tampa Bay 28-yard line, and it was recovered by the Buccaneers. Though they failed to score any points, they were able to punt and pin New England deep in their own territory. On the ensuring drive, with excellent field position, Tampa Bay took the lead with a 8-yard touchdown run by Ronald Jones.

Mac Jones drove the Patriots down the field swiftly, eventually achieving 19 consecutive pass completions, and the Patriots re-took the lead 14–13. Jones threw a 1-yard touchdown pass to Jonnu Smith on the first play of the fourth quarter. With Leonard Fournette and Ronald Jones the leading rushers on the night, Tampa Bay's more balanced offense again drove into the red zone, but had to again settle for a field goal. With under 8 minutes left in regulation, Tampa Bay led 16–14.

Jakobi Meyers caught a 21-yard reception, then executed a flea flicker pass to Nelson Agholor, setting the Patriots up at the Tampa Bay 8-yard line. The Buccaneers defense stiffened, and the Patriots had to settle for a field goal, and a 17–16 lead. Tampa Bay took over with 4:34 remaining in regulation. A costly pass interference penalty on the Patriots advanced Tampa Bay to the New England 44-yard line. The drive stalled at the 30-yard line, and Succop kicked the go-ahead field goal as the game hit the two-minute warning.

Trailing 19–17, Mac Jones drove the Patriots into Tampa Bay territory, aided by a pass interference call on Jordan Whitehead. With heavy rain now falling, New England faced a 3rd & 3 at the Tampa Bay 37. Jones's pass was batted down at the line of scrimmage by Lavonte David, bringing up fourth down. With 59 seconds left in regulation, in a driving rain, Nick Folk's 56-yard field attempt hit the left upright and fell no good. Tampa Bay ran out the clock, and beat the Patriots for the first time since 2000.

==== Week 5: vs. Miami Dolphins ====
Week 5: Miami Dolphins at Tampa Bay Buccaneers – Game summary

Quarter	1	2	3	4	Total
Dolphins	10	0	7	0	**17**
**Buccaneers**	7	17	0	21	**45**

at Raymond James Stadium, Tampa, Florida

- Date: October 10
- Game time: 1:00 p.m. EDT
- Game weather: Cloudy, 84 °F (29 °C)
- Game attendance: 65,570
- Referee: Jerome Boger
- TV announcers (CBS): Jim Nantz, Tony Romo, Tracy Wolfson and Gene Steratore
- Recap, Game Book

Game information

**First quarter**

- MIA – Jason Sanders 23-yard field goal, 11:17. Dolphins 3–0. **Drive: 8 plays, 70 yards, 3:43.**
- TB – Giovani Bernard 10-yard pass from Tom Brady (Ryan Succop kick), 7:04. Buccaneers 7–3. **Drive: 8 plays, 80 yards, 4:13.**
- MIA – Myles Gaskin 24-yard pass from Jacoby Brissett (Jason Sanders kick), 3:16. Dolphins 10–3. **Drive: 8 plays, 75 yards, 3:48.**

**Second quarter**

- TB – Ryan Succop 42-yard field goal, 14:06. Tied 10–10. **Drive: 10 plays, 51 yards, 4:10.**
- TB – Antonio Brown 62-yard pass from Tom Brady (Ryan Succop kick), 11:01. Buccaneers 17–10. **Drive: 3 plays, 70 yards, 1:34.**
- TB – Antonio Brown 4-yard pass from Tom Brady (Ryan Succop kick), 1:48. Buccaneers 24–10. **Drive: 13 plays, 77 yards, 6:19.**

**Third quarter**

- MIA – Myles Gaskin 1-yard pass from Jacoby Brissett (Jason Sanders kick), 6:56. Buccaneers 24–17. **Drive: 11 plays, 87 yards, 5:52.**

**Fourth quarter**

- TB – Leonard Fournette 5-yard run (Ryan Succop kick), 14:57. Buccaneers 31–17. **Drive: 13 plays, 75 yards, 6:59.**
- TB – Mike Evans 34-yard pass from Tom Brady (Ryan Succop kick), 11:49. Buccaneers 38–17. **Drive: 4 plays, 61 yards, 2:10.**
- TB – Mike Evans 22-yard pass from Tom Brady (Ryan Succop kick), 8:57. Buccaneers 45–17. **Drive: 3 plays, 41 yards, 1:50.**

**Top passers**

- MIA – Jacoby Brissett – 27/39, 275 yards, 2 TD, INT
- TB – Tom Brady – 30/41, 411 yards, 5 TD

**Top rushers**

- MIA – Myles Gaskin – 5 rushes, 25 yards
- TB – Leonard Fournette – 12 rushes, 67 yards, TD

**Top receivers**

- MIA – Myles Gaskin – 7 receptions, 74 yards, 2 TD
- TB – Antonio Brown – 7 receptions, 124 yards, 2 TD

Quarterback Tom Brady threw for 411 yards and five touchdown passes, as Tampa Bay defeated in-state rival Miami 45–17. Antonio Brown was the standout receiver, with two touchdown receptions, and 124 total yards. Midway through the second quarter, Brown caught a short, 8-yard pass from Brady, then broke free untouched for a 62-yard touchdown. It was the longest play of the game, and the longest play of the Buccaneers' season thus far.

Just before halftime, Miami drove to the Tampa Bay 30-yard line, but Jacoby Brissett was sacked and fumbled, snuffing out the drive. Brissett was already hobbling with a hamstring injury suffered in the first quarter. Bradley Pinion attempted a 60-yard field as time expired, but missed wide left. Tampa Bay led 24–10 at halftime.

The Dolphins trimmed the deficit to seven points, making the score 24–17 late in the third quarter. But Tampa Bay dominated the fourth quarter. Brady connected with Mike Evans for two touchdowns, as the Buccaneers pulled away for a 45–17 victory, and improved to 4–1 on the season, their best start since 2005. It was the most points Tampa Bay ever scored against their in-state rival Miami, and their largest margin of victory in the series history. Tom Brady also recorded his first game with 400+ yards passing and five or more touchdown passes in the same game.

==== Week 6: at Philadelphia Eagles ====
Week 6: Tampa Bay Buccaneers at Philadelphia Eagles – Game summary

Quarter	1	2	3	4	Total
**Buccaneers**	14	7	7	0	**28**
Eagles	7	0	7	8	**22**

at Lincoln Financial Field, Philadelphia, Pennsylvania

- Date: October 14
- Game time: 8:20 p.m. EDT
- Game weather: Partly cloudy, 70 °F (21 °C)
- Game attendance: 69,796
- Referee: Clay Martin
- TV announcers (Fox/NFLN/Prime Video): Joe Buck, Troy Aikman, Erin Andrews, Kristina Pink and Mike Pereira
- Recap, Game Book

Game information

**First quarter**

- TB – O. J. Howard 2-yard pass from Tom Brady (Ryan Succop kick), 9:26. Buccaneers 7–0. **Drive: 10 plays, 75 yards, 5:34.**
- PHI – Zach Ertz 5-yard pass from Jalen Hurts (Jake Elliott kick), 6:01. Tied 7–7. **Drive: 7 plays, 75 yards, 3:25.**
- TB – Antonio Brown 23-yard pass from Tom Brady (Ryan Succop kick), 0:33. Buccaneers 14–7. **Drive: 9 plays, 75 yards, 5:28.**

**Second quarter**

- TB – Leonard Fournette 2-yard run (Ryan Succop kick), 1:56. Buccaneers 21–7. **Drive: 11 plays, 72 yards, 5:36.**

**Third quarter**

- TB – Leonard Fournette 1-yard run (Ryan Succop kick), 5:47. Buccaneers 28–7. **Drive: 12 plays, 79 yards, 7:41.**
- PHI – Jalen Hurts 6-yard run (Jake Elliott kick), 2:15. Buccaneers 28–14. **Drive: 7 plays, 75 yards, 3:32.**

**Fourth quarter**

- PHI – Jalen Hurts 2-yard run (Jalen Hurts–Quez Watkins pass), 5:54. Buccaneers 28–22. **Drive: 7 plays, 54 yards, 3:05.**

**Top passers**

- TB – Tom Brady – 34/42, 297 yards, 2 TD, INT
- PHI – Jalen Hurts – 12/26, 115 yards, TD, INT

**Top rushers**

- TB – Leonard Fournette – 22 rushes, 81 yards, 2 TD
- PHI – Miles Sanders – 9 rushes, 56 yards

**Top receivers**

- TB – Antonio Brown – 9 receptions, 93 yards, TD
- PHI – Quez Watkins – 3 receptions, 44 yards

Tampa Bay traveled to Philadelphia for a Thursday night matchup. The Buccaneers defeated the Eagles 28–22 to improve to 5–1 on the season. Leonard Fournette carried the ball 22 times for 81 yards and two touchdowns, and quarterback Tom Brady threw two touchdown passes. The Buccaneers built a 21-point lead, then held off an Eagles rally for a 6-point victory.

The Buccaneers defense held Jalen Hurts to only 20 yards passing in the first half. The Eagles offense in total was held to under 100 scrimmage yards through three quarters. However, two costly defensive pass interference penalties against Tampa Bay paved the way for two Eagles touchdowns.

With 9:04 left in regulation, the Tampa Bay offense elected to go for it on a 4th & 2 at the Philadelphia 46-yard line. Brady's pass was incomplete intended for O. J. Howard, turning the ball over on downs. The Eagles took advantage of the field position driving for a touchdown, and trimmed the score to 28–22 with six minutes left in regulation. The Buccaneers, however, were able to control the ball for the rest of the game. Twice they converted on third down and managed to run the clock out to secure the victory.

Tampa Bay's 5–1 start matched the franchise's best record after six games (1979, 1997, 2002, and 2005). Tampa Bay and Philadelphia would later meet in the Wild Card playoffs, with the Buccaneers victorious again.

==== Week 7: vs. Chicago Bears ====
Week 7: Chicago Bears at Tampa Bay Buccaneers – Game summary

Quarter	1	2	3	4	Total
Bears	0	3	0	0	**3**
**Buccaneers**	21	14	0	3	**38**

at Raymond James Stadium, Tampa, Florida

- Date: October 24
- Game time: 4:25 p.m. EDT
- Game weather: Rain, 76 °F (24 °C)
- Game attendance: 65,635
- Referee: Alex Kemp
- TV announcers (CBS): Jim Nantz, Tony Romo, Tracy Wolfson and Gene Steratore
- Recap, Game Book

Game information

**First quarter**

- TB – Leonard Fournette 2-yard run (Ryan Succop kick), 11:58. Buccaneers 7–0. **Drive: 2 plays, 32 yards, 0:51.**
- TB – Chris Godwin 4-yard pass from Tom Brady (Ryan Succop kick), 4:37. Buccaneers 14–0. **Drive: 6 plays, 40 yards, 2:36.**
- TB – Mike Evans 9-yard pass from Tom Brady (Ryan Succop kick), 0:06. Buccaneers 21–0. **Drive: 5 plays, 35 yards, 2:01.**

**Second quarter**

- CHI – Cairo Santos 28-yard field goal, 6:08. Buccaneers 21–3. **Drive: 10 plays, 57 yards, 3:53.**
- TB – Mike Evans 2-yard pass from Tom Brady (Ryan Succop kick), 3:35. Buccaneers 28–3. **Drive: 5 plays, 75 yards, 2:33.**
- TB – Mike Evans 8-yard pass from Tom Brady (Ryan Succop kick), 0:09. Buccaneers 35–3. **Drive: 10 plays, 48 yards, 1:45.**

**Third quarter**

- No scoring plays.

**Fourth quarter**

- TB – Ryan Succop 22-yard field goal, 12:51. Buccaneers 38–3. **Drive: 6 plays, 33 yards, 2:02.**

**Top passers**

- CHI – Justin Fields – 22/32, 184 yards, 3 INT
- TB – Tom Brady – 20/36, 211 yards, 4 TD

**Top rushers**

- CHI – Khalil Herbert – 18 rushes, 100 yards
- TB – Leonard Fournette – 15 rushes, 81 yards, TD

**Top receivers**

- CHI – Cole Kmet – 5 receptions, 43 yards
- TB – Chris Godwin – 8 receptions, 111 yards, TD

Quarterback Tom Brady became the first player in NFL history to throw 600 career touchdown passes (regular season). Brady reached the historic career milestone with a 9-yard touchdown pass to Mike Evans late in the first quarter. The Buccaneers routed the Bears by the score of 38–3. Brady threw a total of four touchdown passes, three to Evans, as Tampa Bay took an unsurmountable 35–3 lead into halftime.

Despite missing Lavonte David and Richard Sherman, the Tampa Bay defense still dominated the Bears. Quarterback Justin Fields was sacked four times, lost two fumbles, and was intercepted three times. The Buccaneers improved to 6–1 on the season, and 4–0 at home. It is the team's first 6–1 start in franchise history.

==== Week 8: at New Orleans Saints ====
Week 8: Tampa Bay Buccaneers at New Orleans Saints – Game summary

Quarter	1	2	3	4	Total
Buccaneers	7	0	14	6	**27**
**Saints**	7	9	7	13	**36**

at Caesars Superdome, New Orleans, Louisiana

- Date: October 31
- Game time: 4:25 p.m. EDT/3:25 p.m. CDT
- Game weather: None (indoor stadium)
- Game attendance: 69,170
- Referee: Clete Blakeman
- TV announcers (Fox): Joe Davis, Troy Aikman, Erin Andrews and Tom Rinaldi
- Recap, Game Book

Game information

**First quarter**

- TB – Chris Godwin 12-yard pass from Tom Brady (Ryan Succop kick), 8:28. Buccaneers 7–0. **Drive: 6 plays, 44 yards, 2:26.**
- NO – Tre'Quan Smith 16-yard pass from Jameis Winston (Brian Johnson kick), 2:39. Tied 7–7. **Drive: 11 plays, 75 yards, 5:49.**

**Second quarter**

- NO – Brian Johnson 23-yard field goal, 2:20. Saints 10–7. **Drive: 10 plays, 58 yards, 5:16.**
- NO – Alex Armah 1-yard pass from Trevor Siemian (kick failed), 0:27. Saints 16–7. **Drive: 5 plays, 35 yards, 1:21.**

**Third quarter**

- NO – Alvin Kamara 1-yard run (Brian Johnson kick), 9:01. Saints 23–7. **Drive: 10 plays, 76 yards, 5:59.**
- TB – Giovani Bernard 7-yard pass from Tom Brady (Ryan Succop kick), 5:33. Saints 23–14. **Drive: 8 plays, 75 yards, 3:28.**
- TB – Mike Evans 41-yard pass from Tom Brady (Ryan Succop kick), 1:15. Saints 23–21. **Drive: 5 plays, 69 yards, 3:11.**

**Fourth quarter**

- NO – Brian Johnson 35-yard field goal, 8:31. Saints 26–21. **Drive: 8 plays, 50 yards, 3:37.**
- TB – Cyril Grayson 50-yard pass from Tom Brady (run failed), 5:44. Buccaneers 27–26. **Drive: 5 plays, 75 yards, 2:47.**
- NO – Brian Johnson 23-yard field goal, 1:41. Saints 29–27. **Drive: 12 plays, 70 yards, 4:03.**
- NO – P. J. Williams 40-yard interception return (Brian Johnson kick), 1:24. Saints 36–27.

**Top passers**

- TB – Tom Brady – 28/40, 375 yards, 4 TD, 2 INT
- NO – Trevor Siemian – 16/29, 159 yards, TD

**Top rushers**

- TB – Giovani Bernard – 2 rushes, 30 yards
- NO – Alvin Kamara – 19 rushes, 61 yards, TD

**Top receivers**

- TB – Chris Godwin – 8 receptions, 140 yards, TD
- NO – Kevin White – 1 reception, 38 yards

Quarterback Tom Brady threw four touchdown passes, but lost a fumble and threw two interceptions (one of which was returned for a touchdown), as Tampa Bay fell to division rival New Orleans. It was the fourth consecutive regular season victory by the Saints in the rivalry, although Tampa Bay had won the previous meeting, which was during the 2020 season playoffs.

Tampa Bay faced former quarterback Jameis Winston for the first time since Winston was named the starting quarterback for the Saints. Winston departed Tampa following the 2019 season. Early in the second quarter, at the Saints' own 9-yard line, Winston scrambled for 3 yards, but was taken down by Devin White's horse-collar tackle. Winston suffered a torn ACL and damaged MCL, and was replaced by back up quarterback Trevor Siemian for the remainder of the game. Penalties by the Buccaneers (11 for 99 yards) were the story of the day. One interception in the endzone was negated by penalty, and multiple Saints drives were extended by penalties on the Tampa Bay defense.

Brady rallied the Buccaneers from a 23–7 deficit. Tampa Bay took a 27–26 lead with a 50-yard touchdown pass from Brady to Cyril Grayson. The Saints then added a go-ahead field goal with 1:41 left in regulation. Trailing 29–27, Brady's pick-six with 1:36 left secured the win for New Orleans.

The amount of penalties committed by Tampa Bay almost surpassed the 2015 Philadelphia Eagles as they were hit with 10 penalties six years ago.

==== Week 10: at Washington Football Team ====
Week 10: Tampa Bay Buccaneers at Washington Football Team – Game summary

Quarter	1	2	3	4	Total
Buccaneers	0	6	7	6	**19**
**Washington**	6	10	7	6	**29**

at FedExField, Landover, Maryland

- Date: November 14
- Game time: 1:00 p.m. EST
- Game weather: Cloudy, 47 °F (8 °C)
- Game attendance: 52,128
- Referee: Brad Rogers
- TV announcers (Fox): Adam Amin, Mark Schlereth and Shannon Spake
- Recap, Game Book

Game information

**First quarter**

- WAS – Joey Slye 46-yard field goal, 9:57. Football Team 3–0. **Drive: 8 plays, 32 yards, 3:36.**
- WAS – Joey Slye 28-yard field goal, 5:56. Football Team 6–0. **Drive: 7 plays, 18 yards, 3:50.**

**Second quarter**

- WAS – DeAndre Carter 20-yard pass from Taylor Heinicke (Joey Slye kick), 12:21. Football Team 13–0. **Drive: 10 plays, 46 yards, 5:59.**
- TB – Ryan Succop 25-yard field goal, 6:44. Football Team 13–3. **Drive: 13 plays, 68 yards, 5:37.**
- WAS – Joey Slye 29-yard field goal, 0:58. Football Team 16–3. **Drive: 11 plays, 64 yards, 5:46.**
- TB – Ryan Succop 31-yard field goal, 0:00. Football Team 16–6. **Drive: 8 plays, 58 yards, 0:58.**

**Third quarter**

- TB – Cameron Brate 6-yard pass from Tom Brady (Ryan Succop kick), 8:46. Football Team 16–13. **Drive: 4 plays, 43 yards, 2:00.**
- WAS – Antonio Gibson 1-yard run (Joey Slye kick), 4:21. Football Team 23–13. **Drive: 8 plays, 71 yards, 4:25.**

**Fourth quarter**

- TB – Mike Evans 40-yard pass from Tom Brady (kick failed), 10:55. Football Team 23–19. **Drive: 3 plays, 47 yards, 1:32.**
- WAS – Antonio Gibson 1-yard run (run failed), 0:29. Football Team 29–19. **Drive: 19 plays, 80 yards, 10:26.**

**Top passers**

- TB – Tom Brady – 23/34, 220 yards, 2 TD, 2 INT
- WAS – Taylor Heinicke – 26/32, 256 yards, TD

**Top rushers**

- TB – Leonard Fournette – 11 rushes, 47 yards
- WAS – Antonio Gibson – 24 rushes, 64 yards, 2 TD

**Top receivers**

- TB – Mike Evans – 2 receptions, 62 yards, TD
- WAS – Terry McLaurin – 6 reception, 59 yards

This was a rematch of the 2020 Wild Card Round in which Tampa Bay defeated Washington 31–23 on their way to a Super Bowl victory. The Washington Football Team ended up the better team this game, as the defending champions were given a 29–19 upset loss.

Two first quarter interceptions thrown by Tom Brady led to field goals; Washington's lead increased to 13 points with a DeAndre Carter pass from Washington quarterback Taylor Heinicke. The Buccaneers were able to close the lead to 16–13, and then to 23–19 after a 40-yard touchdown pass to Mike Evans with 10:55 remaining in regulation. But a 19-play, 80-yard touchdown drive lasting over ten minutes by Washington effectively closed the fourth quarter sealing Tampa Bay's fate as Washington won 29–19.

==== Week 11: vs. New York Giants ====
Week 11: New York Giants at Tampa Bay Buccaneers – Game summary

Quarter	1	2	3	4	Total
Giants	3	7	0	0	**10**
**Buccaneers**	7	10	10	3	**30**

at Raymond James Stadium, Tampa, Florida

- Date: November 22
- Game time: 8:15 p.m. EST
- Game weather: Cloudy, 69 °F (21 °C)
- Game attendance: 65,643
- Referee: Craig Wrolstad
- TV announcers (ESPN): Steve Levy, Brian Griese, Louis Riddick, Lisa Salters and John Parry
- Recap, Game Book

Game information

**First quarter**

- TB – Chris Godwin 13-yard pass from Tom Brady (Ryan Succop kick), 11:03. Buccaneers 7–0. **Drive: 8 plays, 73 yards, 3:57.**
- NYG – Graham Gano 37-yard field goal, 4:04. Buccaneers 7–3. **Drive: 13 plays, 56 yards, 6:59.**

**Second quarter**

- TB – Ryan Succop 25-yard field goal, 11:16. Buccaneers 10–3. **Drive: 18 plays, 79 yards, 7:48.**
- NYG – Andrew Thomas 2-yard pass from Daniel Jones (Graham Gano kick), 9:14. Tied 10–10. **Drive: 2 plays, 5 yards, 0:39.**
- TB – Ronald Jones II 6-yard run (Ryan Succop kick), 5:06. Buccaneers 17–10. **Drive: 8 plays, 71 yards, 4:08.**

**Third quarter**

- TB – Mike Evans 5-yard pass from Tom Brady (Ryan Succop kick), 7:31. Buccaneers 24–10. **Drive: 10 plays, 74 yards, 4:51.**
- TB – Ryan Succop 40-yard field goal, 3:53. Buccaneers 27–10. **Drive: 6 plays, 15 yards, 2:21.**

**Fourth quarter**

- TB – Ryan Succop 30-yard field goal, 7:44. Buccaneers 30–10. **Drive: 5 plays, 27 yards, 2:18.**

**Top passers**

- NYG – Daniel Jones – 23/38, 167 yards, TD, 2 INT
- TB – Tom Brady – 30/46, 307 yards, 2 TD, INT

**Top rushers**

- NYG – Saquon Barkley – 6 rushes, 25 yards
- TB – Leonard Fournette – 10 rushes, 35 yards

**Top receivers**

- NYG – Kadarius Toney – 7 receptions, 40 yards
- TB – Mike Evans – 6 receptions, 73 yards, TD

Tampa Bay hosted the Giants on Monday Night Football. The Buccaneers snapped a two-game losing streak and won by the score of 30–10. With a touchdown reception in the third quarter, Mike Evans became the franchise's all-time leader in total touchdowns with 72. He came into the game tied with Mike Alstott (71), who had held that distinction since 2001.

The Buccaneers set the tone for the night early, taking the opening kickoff, and driving 73 yards in eight plays (never facing a third down). Tom Brady connected to Chris Godwin for a 13-yard touchdown pass, and a 7–0 early score. The Buccaneers defense then forced a turnover on downs. Both teams traded field goals, and the score was 10–3 in favor of the Buccaneers. On a 1st & 10 at their own 15-yard line, Brady's short pass attempt to Evans was bobbled and intercepted by Adoree' Jackson, who was tackled at the Tampa Bay 5-yard line. Two plays later, Daniel Jones lofted a pass to linebacker Andrew Thomas for a 2-yard touchdown, and a 10–10 tie.

Trailing 17–10, the Giants received the second half kickoff. Once again, the Giants offense turned the ball over on downs in Tampa Bay territory. After Evans's record-setting touchdown, the Buccaneers were up 24–10. Ryan Succop tacked on two more field goals, and the Buccaneers cruised to a 30–10 victory.

Tom Brady threw for 307 yards and two touchdown passes. After missing several weeks recuperating from injury, Rob Gronkowski returned to the lineup, making 8 catches for 71 yards. The Buccaneers defense held Jones to only 167 yards passing, two interceptions, and two sacks. The Giants were held scoreless in the second half, and outside of the first drive of the third quarter, had only four plays in Tampa Bay territory in the second half.

==== Week 12: at Indianapolis Colts ====
Week 12: Tampa Bay Buccaneers at Indianapolis Colts – Game summary

Quarter	1	2	3	4	Total
**Buccaneers**	0	14	14	10	**38**
Colts	3	21	0	7	**31**

at Lucas Oil Stadium, Indianapolis, Indiana

- Date: November 28
- Game time: 1:00 p.m. EST
- Game weather: None (retractable roof closed)
- Game attendance: 66,140
- Referee: Shawn Smith
- TV announcers (Fox): Kevin Burkhardt, Greg Olsen and Pam Oliver
- Recap, Game Book

Game information

**First quarter**

- IND – Michael Badgley 45-yard field goal, 12:31. Colts 3–0. **Drive: 4 plays, 4 yards, 1:34.**

**Second quarter**

- TB – Leonard Fournette 1-yard run (Ryan Succop kick), 13:22. Buccaneers 7–3. **Drive: 7 plays, 34 yards, 4:12.**
- IND – Ashton Dulin 62-yard pass from Carson Wentz (Michael Badgley kick), 11:44. Colts 10–7. **Drive: 3 plays, 75 yards, 1:38.**
- IND – Jack Doyle 15-yard pass from Carson Wentz (Michael Badgley kick), 5:07. Colts 17–7. **Drive: 9 plays, 90 yards, 5:43.**
- TB – Leonard Fournette 4-yard pass from Tom Brady (Ryan Succop kick), 1:56. Colts 17–14. **Drive: 8 plays, 84 yards, 3:11.**
- IND – T. Y. Hilton 4-yard pass from Carson Wentz (Michael Badgley kick), 0:18. Colts 24–14. **Drive: 14 plays, 75 yards, 1:38.**

**Third quarter**

- TB – Leonard Fournette 4-yard run (Ryan Succop kick), 8:06. Colts 24–21. **Drive: 6 plays, 65 yards, 2:52.**
- TB – Ronald Jones II 1-yard run (Ryan Succop kick), 1:06. Buccaneers 28–24. **Drive: 7 plays, 65 yards, 4:16.**

**Fourth quarter**

- TB – Ryan Succop 25-yard field goal, 10:06. Buccaneers 31–24. **Drive: 6 plays, 13 yards, 2:22.**
- IND – Jonathan Taylor 4-yard run (Michael Badgley kick), 3:29. Tied 31–31. **Drive: 10 plays, 75 yards, 6:37.**
- TB – Leonard Fournette 28-yard run (Ryan Succop kick), 0:20. Buccaneers 38–31. **Drive: 8 plays, 75 yards, 3:09.**

**Top passers**

- TB – Tom Brady – 25/34, 226 yards, TD, INT
- IND – Carson Wentz – 27/44, 306 yards, 3 TD, 2 INT

**Top rushers**

- TB – Leonard Fournette – 17 rushes, 100 yards, 3 TD
- IND – Jonathan Taylor – 16 rushes, 83 yards, TD

**Top receivers**

- TB – Rob Gronkowski – 7 receptions, 123 yards
- IND – Jack Doyle – 6 rushes, 81 yards, TD

Leonard Fournette had 17 rushes for 100 yards and three touchdowns, along with one receiving touchdown, as Tampa Bay defeated Indianapolis by the score of 38–31. The Buccaneers erased a ten-point halftime deficit, scoring 17 points off of turnovers in the second half. Fournette reportedly gave an impassioned halftime speech in the locker room to help motivate his teammates.

The Buccaneers took a 7–3 lead early in the second quarter with a 1-yard touchdown run by Leonard Fournette, his first of the game. The touchdown drive was set up by a Colts fumble. Indianapolis, however, jumped ahead with a 62-yard bomb from Carson Wentz to Ashton Dulin. Three plays later, Tom Brady's deep pass intended for Scotty Miller was intercepted by Isaiah Rodgers at the Indianapolis 10-yard line. Wentz drove the Colts 90 yards in 9 plays, capped off by a 15-yard touchdown pass to Jack Doyle. The Buccaneers answered with a touchdown catch by Fournette, but the Colts were not done. Inside the two-minute warning, Wentz and the Colts swiftly moved down the field, twice converting on 3rd-and-long. Facing a 4th & 1 at the Tampa Bay 4, head coach Frank Reich elected to go for it, and T. Y. Hilton made the catch for a touchdown. The Colts took a 24–14 lead into halftime.

The Colts received the ball to start the second half, but the third quarter belonged to the Buccaneers. Driving at the Tampa Bay 20-yard line, Wentz was sacked by Shaquil Barrett and fumbled. Brady's second deep pass attempt to Scotty Miller was incomplete, but this time drew a pass interference penalty. Three plays later, Fournette scored his second rushing touchdown. The Colts crossed midfield, and Wentz threw a deep bomb to Michael Pittman Jr., but this time he was intercepted by Antoine Winfield Jr. The Buccaneers turned that turnover into points as well. After a key 32-yard reception by Rob Gronkowski, and a pass interference penalty in the endzone, Ronald Jones II scored on a 1-yard carry.

The Buccaneers defense forced a three-and-out to start the fourth quarter. Tampa Bay received the ball, but also went three-and-out, still clinging to a 28–24 lead. Bradley Pinion's punt was muffed by Nyheim Hines, and recovered by Scotty Miller at the Colts 19-yard line. Ryan Succop kicked a 25-yard field goal to put Tampa Bay up 31–24 with 10:06 left in regulation.

After giving up 17 straight points off of turnovers, the Colts shifted their offensive attack to running back Jonathan Taylor. Taylor handled eight carries on their next drive, including a 4-yard touchdown run that tied the game at 31–31. With 3:29 left, the Buccaneers drove for the winning touchdown. Tom Brady completed four passes, and two strong runs by Leonard Fournette set the Buccaneers up with a 1st & 10 at the Colts 28-yard line with 29 seconds left. Tampa Bay was expected to run the clock down and kick a field goal. Fournette took a handoff, but shockingly broke free and made it to the endzone for a 28-yard touchdown run, his fourth score of the day. Leading 38–31, the Buccaneers almost gave up a touchdown on the ensuing kickoff return. Isaiah Rodgers ran the ball back 72 yards to the Tampa Bay 32-yard line before Mike Edwards remarkably chased him down. After a quick incompletion, Carson Wentz's Hail Mary pass fell short of the endzone and was intercepted by Pierre Desir as time expired.

==== Week 13: at Atlanta Falcons ====
Week 13: Tampa Bay Buccaneers at Atlanta Falcons – Game summary

Quarter	1	2	3	4	Total
**Buccaneers**	13	7	7	3	**30**
Falcons	7	10	0	0	**17**

at Mercedes-Benz Stadium, Atlanta, Georgia

- Date: December 5
- Game time: 1:00 p.m. EST
- Game weather: None (retractable roof closed)
- Game attendance: 69,366
- Referee: Tony Corrente
- TV announcers (Fox): Kenny Albert, Jonathan Vilma and Sara Walsh
- Recap, Game Book

Game information

**First quarter**

- TB – Leonard Fournette 3-yard pass from Tom Brady (Ryan Succop kick), 9:53. Buccaneers 7–0. **Drive: 13 plays, 75 yards, 5:07.**
- ATL – Mike Davis 17-yard run (Younghoe Koo kick), 6:40. Tied 7–7. **Drive: 6 plays, 75 yards, 3:13.**
- TB – Cameron Brate 7-yard pass from Tom Brady (kick failed), 4:23. Buccaneers 13–7. **Drive: 6 plays, 75 yards, 2:17.**

**Second quarter**

- ATL – Younghoe Koo 21-yard field goal, 8:39. Buccaneers 14–10. **Drive: 15 plays, 72 yards, 7:00.**
- TB – Rob Gronkowski 27-yard pass from Tom Brady (Ryan Succop kick), 4:54. Buccaneers 20–10. **Drive: 9 plays, 75 yards, 3:45.**
- ATL – Marlon Davidson 3-yard interception return (Younghoe Koo kick), 0:22. Buccaneers 20–17.

**Third quarter**

- TB – Rob Gronkowski 11-yard pass from Tom Brady (Ryan Succop kick), 0:29. Buccaneers 27–17. **Drive: 14 plays, 87 yards, 5:43.**

**Fourth quarter**

- TB – Ryan Succop 31-yard field goal, 1:49. Buccaneers 30–17. **Drive: 13 plays, 78 yards, 5:36.**

**Top passers**

- TB – Tom Brady – 38/51, 368 yards, 4 TD, INT
- ATL – Matt Ryan – 30/41, 297 yards

**Top rushers**

- TB – Leonard Fournette – 13 rushes, 44 yards
- ATL – Cordarrelle Patterson – 13 rushes, 78 yards

**Top receivers**

- TB – Chris Godwin – 15 receptions, 143 yards
- ATL – Russell Gage – 11 receptions, 130 yards

Tampa Bay swept the Atlanta Falcons for the second season in a row, after a 30–17 victory at Mercedes-Benz Stadium. Chris Godwin set a franchise single-game record with 15 pass receptions, while Tom Brady threw for 368 yards in 51 attempts and four touchdowns. The Buccaneers defense sacked Matt Ryan five times, and the Falcons committed five fumbles (1 lost).

Despite the Falcons entering the game ranked only 23rd in the league in rushing defense, the Tampa Bay offense came out of the gate with a passing attack. On the opening drive, the Buccaneers drove 75 yards in 13 plays – all passing plays. Tom Brady capped the drive off with a 3-yard touchdown pass to the previous week's offensive standout, Leonard Fournette. On their next drive, Brady completed key passes to Chris Godwin (25 yards), then with Mike Evans (36 yards), setting up a 3-yard touchdown pass to Cameron Brate.

Brady connected with Rob Gronkowski for a 27-yard touchdown catch, and a 20–10 lead mid-way through the second quarter. With under five minutes left in the half, Matt Ryan drove the Falcons across midfield. The drive stalled at the Tampa Bay 42, and Thomas Morstead's punt pinned the Buccaneers back to their own 7-yard line. With 27 seconds left in the half, Brady from his own endzone, threw a short pass left intended for Leonard Fournette. Marlon Davidson undercut the route and intercepted the ball, running it three yards to the endzone for a surprising Falcons touchdown. The Buccaneers took a 20–17 lead into halftime.

The Falcons got the ball to start the second half. Four plays into the drive, Ryan's pass to Russell Gage was caught at the Tampa Bay 45, but punched out by Pierre Desir and the fumble was recovered by Carlton Davis. The Falcons were subsequently held scoreless in the second half. Brady tacked on a second touchdown pass to Gronkowski – the duo's 90th regular season touchdown – which moved them into second all-time in NFL history.

With this victory Tampa Bay recorded a season with a winning record in consecutive years for the first time since they did so in 2007 and 2008.

==== Week 14: vs. Buffalo Bills ====
Week 14: Buffalo Bills at Tampa Bay Buccaneers – Game summary

Quarter	1	2	3	4	OT	Total
Bills	0	3	7	17	0	**27**
**Buccaneers**	7	17	0	3	6	**33**

at Raymond James Stadium, Tampa, Florida

- Date: December 12
- Game time: 4:25 p.m. EST
- Game weather: Cloudy, 81 °F (27 °C)
- Game attendance: 65,655
- Referee: Scott Novak
- TV announcers (CBS): Jim Nantz, Tony Romo, Tracy Wolfson and Gene Steratore
- Recap, Game Book

Game information

**First quarter**

- TB – Leonard Fournette 47-yard run (Ryan Succop kick), 8:13. Buccaneers 7–0. **Drive: 5 plays, 67 yards, 1:42.**

**Second quarter**

- TB – Ryan Succop 23-yard field goal, 13:36. Buccaneers 10–0. **Drive: 15 plays, 80 yards, 6:43.**
- BUF – Tyler Bass 21-yard field goal, 9:28. Buccaneers 10–3. **Drive: 7 plays, 72 yards, 4:08.**
- TB – Mike Evans 13-yard pass from Tom Brady (Ryan Succop kick), 7:11. Buccaneers 17–3. **Drive: 7 plays, 75 yards, 2:17.**
- TB – Tom Brady 1-yard run (Ryan Succop kick), 1:29. Buccaneers 24–3. **Drive: 10 plays, 72 yards, 2:43.**

**Third quarter**

- BUF – Josh Allen 18-yard run (Tyler Bass kick), 7:29. Buccaneers 24–10. **Drive: 9 plays, 81 yards, 3:40.**

**Fourth quarter**

- TB – Ryan Succop 24-yard field goal, 11:20. Buccaneers 27–10. **Drive: 11 plays, 84 yards, 5:51.**
- BUF – Dawson Knox 15-yard pass from Josh Allen (Tyler Bass kick), 9:07. Buccaneers 27–17. **Drive: 5 plays, 75 yards, 2:13.**
- BUF – Gabe Davis 4-yard pass from Josh Allen (Tyler Bass kick), 4:53. Buccaneers 27–24. **Drive: 9 plays, 46 yards, 3:15.**
- BUF – Tyler Bass 25-yard field goal, 0:22. Tied 27–27. **Drive: 14 plays, 70 yards, 2:43.**

**Overtime**

- TB – Breshad Perriman 58-yard pass from Tom Brady, 5:31. Buccaneers 33–27. **Drive: 6 plays, 94 yards, 3:17**

**Top passers**

- BUF – Josh Allen – 36/54, 308 yards, 2 TD, INT
- TB – Tom Brady – 31/46, 363 yards, 2 TD

**Top rushers**

- BUF – Josh Allen – 12 rushes, 109 yards, TD
- TB – Leonard Fournette – 19 rushes, 113 yards, TD

**Top receivers**

- BUF – Stefon Diggs – 7 receptions, 74 yards
- TB – Chris Godwin – 10 receptions, 105 yards

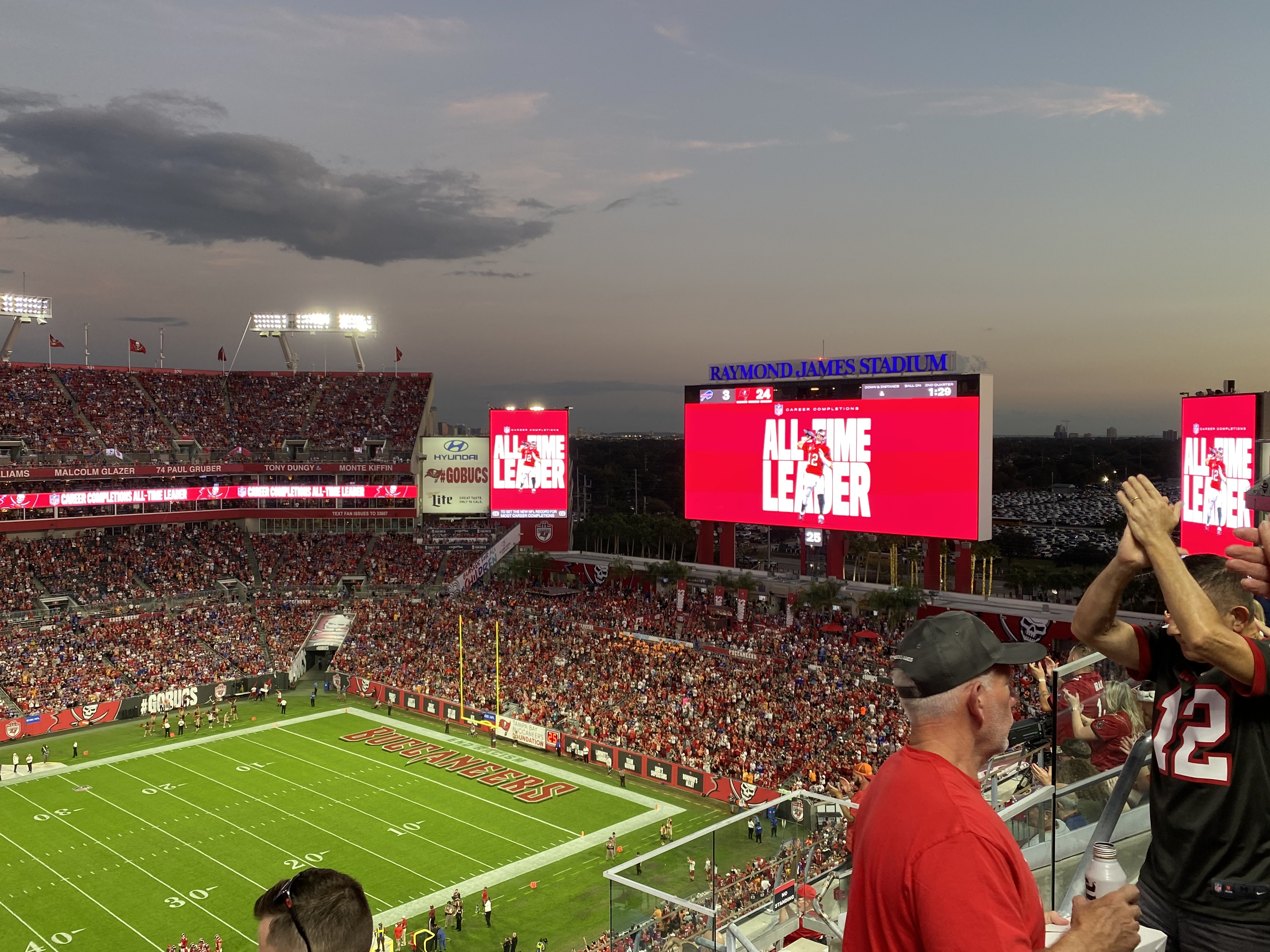
The Buccaneers take on the Bills.

Tampa Bay built a 24–3 halftime lead, then survived a furious Bills comeback to win 33–27 in overtime. Quarterback Tom Brady threw his 700th career touchdown pass (combined regular season & postseason), a game-winning, 58-yard catch and run to Breshad Perriman in overtime. Brady also set the NFL record for most pass completions (passing Drew Brees). The Buccaneers improved to 10–3 on the season, and 6–0 at home. It was the Buccaneers 8th consecutive win at Raymond James Stadium (including Super Bowl LV).

On the first play of the game, an errant snap was fumbled for a 14-yard loss leading to a three-and-out. But Tampa Bay otherwise dominated the first half. Leonard Fournette's 47-yard touchdown run gave the Buccaneers an early 7–0 lead. The teams traded field goals, then at the Buffalo 13-yard line, Brady dropped back under pressure. He threw up a high pass to Mike Evans, who made a leaping fingertip grab in the left corner of the endzone for the touchdown. The Bills failed to advance into Tampa Bay territory on their next drive, and punted back to the Buccaneers. Brady connected again to Evans for a lofting, 20-yard catch at the Buffalo 2-yard line. Two plays later, Brady's 1-yard quarterback sneak put Tampa Bay up 24–3. The Bills had one last chance before halftime, but the drive was snuffed out when Josh Allen's errant pass was intercepted by a diving Richard Sherman.

The Bills mounted a spirited comeback in the second half. Josh Allen had a touchdown run and two touchdown passes to trim the score to 27–24. With 3:05 left in the fourth quarter, the Bills got the ball for a potential game-winning or game-tying score. Allen drove the Bills to the Tampa Bay 7-yard line, but the Buccaneers defense kept them out of the endzone. Kicker Tyler Bass's 25-yard field goal tied the game at 27–27 with 25 seconds remaining in regulation. The Bills had outscored the Buccaneers 24–3 in the second half.

In the overtime period, Buffalo won the coin toss and received. The Bills went three-and-out, and were forced to punt. Matt Haack's 63-yard punt pinned the Buccaneers back at their own 6-yard line. Facing a 3rd & 1 at their own 15-yard line, Leonard Fournette rushed up the middle for an apparent first down. The play was reviewed and upheld, giving Tampa Bay a first down. A costly pass interference penalty on Levi Wallace advanced the Buccaneers to the 35-yard line. Two plays later, Brady connected to Rob Gronkowski for a 14-yard gain to the Tampa Bay 42-yard line. Facing 3rd & 3, Brady hit Breshad Perriman on a crossing route, and Perriman scurried 58 yards down the right sideline, nearly untouched, for the game-winning touchdown.

==== Week 15: vs. New Orleans Saints ====
Week 15: New Orleans Saints at Tampa Bay Buccaneers – Game summary

Quarter	1	2	3	4	Total
**Saints**	3	3	0	3	**9**
Buccaneers	0	0	0	0	**0**

at Raymond James Stadium, Tampa, Florida

- Date: December 19
- Game time: 8:20 p.m. EST
- Game weather: Cloudy, 75 °F (24 °C)
- Game attendance: 65,744
- Referee: John Hussey
- TV announcers (NBC): Mike Tirico, Cris Collinsworth, Michele Tafoya and Terry McAulay
- Recap, Game Book

Game information

**First quarter**

- NO – Brett Maher 39-yard field goal, 5:44. Saints 3–0. **Drive: 9 plays, 60 yards, 4:22.**

**Second quarter**

- NO – Brett Maher 35-yard field goal, 14:55. Saints 6–0. **Drive: 8 plays, 40 yards, 3:53.**

**Third quarter**

- No scoring plays.

**Fourth quarter**

- NO – Brett Maher 42-yard field goal, 7:28. Saints 9–0. **Drive: 10 plays, 42 yards, 4:33.**

**Top passers**

- NO – Taysom Hill – 13/27, 154 yards
- TB – Tom Brady – 26/48, 214 yards, INT

**Top rushers**

- NO – Taysom Hill – 11 rushes, 33 yards
- TB – Ronald Jones II – 8 rushes, 63 yards

**Top receivers**

- NO – Marquez Callaway – 6 receptions, 112 yards
- TB – Chris Godwin – 6 receptions, 49 yards

Tampa Bay hosted division rival New Orleans on Sunday Night Football. With a win, the Buccaneers would clinch the NFC South division title (the club's first since 2007). However, the Saints (who were heavy underdogs) shutout the Buccaneers 9–0, sweeping the regular season series for the third year in a row. It was also the first time Brady was shutout in a game since Week 14 of the 2006 season against the Miami Dolphins.

Injuries sent several Buccaneers players to the locker room. Mike Evans (strained hamstring), Chris Godwin (torn ACL), Leonard Fournette (hamstring), Lavonte David (foot), and Pat O'Connor (knee) all left the game early. Breshad Perriman was inactive on the COVID-19 list, while Antonio Brown and Mike Edwards were both serving the final game of a three-week suspension due to presenting counterfeit vaccination cards. Quarterback Tom Brady was sacked four times, threw an interception, and fumbled away the ball on a quarterback scramble. Neither team reached the end zone, and Brett Maher's three field goals were the only points of the game.

Prior to the game, Saints head coach Sean Payton tested positive for COVID-19 and was not permitted to attend. With the loss (their lone home loss of the season), Tampa Bay slipped to 10–4, and failed to secure a playoff berth for at least one additional week.

After being picked off by the Saints, Brady yelled at Dennis Allen and then proceeded to destroy the Microsoft Surface Pro tablet in frustration.

==== Week 16: at Carolina Panthers ====
Week 16: Tampa Bay Buccaneers at Carolina Panthers – Game summary

Quarter	1	2	3	4	Total
**Buccaneers**	7	12	10	3	**32**
Panthers	3	3	0	0	**6**

at Bank of America Stadium, Charlotte, North Carolina

- Date: December 26
- Game time: 1:00 p.m. EST
- Game weather: Sunny, 73 °F (23 °C)
- Game attendance: 71,918
- Referee: Brad Allen
- TV announcers (Fox): Kevin Kugler, Mark Sanchez and Laura Okmin
- Recap, Game Book

Game information

**First quarter**

- CAR – Lirim Hajrullahu 24-yard field goal, 7:17. Panthers 3–0. **Drive: 9 plays, 64 yards, 5:04.**
- TB – Ke'Shawn Vaughn 55-yard run (Ryan Succop kick), 4:13. Buccaneers 7–3. **Drive: 5 plays, 75 yards, 3:04.**

**Second quarter**

- TB – Ryan Succop 36-yard field goal, 10:54. Buccaneers 10–3. **Drive: 10 plays, 33 yards, 5:47.**
- CAR – Lirim Hajrullahu 29-yard field goal, 7:20. Buccaneers 10–6. **Drive: 6 plays, 64 yards, 3:34.**
- TB – Ryan Succop 43-yard field goal, 2:40. Buccaneers 13–6. **Drive: 9 plays, 50 yards, 4:40.**
- TB – Cameron Brate 4-yard pass from Tom Brady (pass failed), 1:19. Buccaneers 19–6. **Drive: 4 plays, 69 yards, 0:22.**

**Third quarter**

- TB – Ryan Succop 21-yard field goal, 8:34. Buccaneers 22–6. **Drive: 9 plays, 51 yards, 3:56.**
- TB – Ronald Jones II 7-yard run (Ryan Succop kick), 2:08. Buccaneers 29–6. **Drive: 7 plays, 57 yards, 4:17.**

**Fourth quarter**

- TB – Ryan Succop 48-yard field goal, 7:59. Buccaneers 32–6. **Drive: 5 plays, 15 yards, 1:50.**

**Top passers**

- TB – Tom Brady – 18/30, 232 yards, TD
- CAR – Sam Darnold – 15/32, 190 yards

**Top rushers**

- TB – Ke'Shawn Vaughn – 7 rushes, 70 yards, TD
- CAR – Cam Newton – 5 rushes, 42 yards

**Top receivers**

- TB – Antonio Brown – 10 receptions, 101 yards
- CAR – Shi Smith – 3 receptions, 86 yards

Tampa Bay clinched the NFC South division title after a 32–6 victory at rival Carolina. Going into the game, the Buccaneers starting lineup was depleted by injuries and the COVID-19 list. Antonio Brown returned to the lineup after recuperating from an ankle injury, then a three-game suspension. Brown led all receivers with ten catches for 101 yards. The Buccaneers won their division for the first time since 2007, and clinched a playoff berth for the second year in a row - the first time going to the playoffs in consecutive seasons since 1999–2002.

The Panthers got on the board first, after a 24-yard Lirim Hajrullahu field goal, and took a 3–0 lead. The game turned quickly, however, in the Buccaneers' favor, with big plays on offense. Ke'Shawn Vaughn's 55-yard touchdown run in the first quarter gave the Buccaneers a 7–3 lead, and was their longest rush of the season. Later, Tom Brady found a wide-open Cyril Grayson for a 62-yard catch down the right sideline. That set up a 4-yard touchdown pass to Cameron Brate.

The Buccaneers took a 19–6 lead into halftime, and shutout the Panthers in the second half. Ronald Jones II added a touchdown run in the third quarter. The Buccaneers defense tallied seven sacks and one interception. Both Sam Darnold and Cam Newton took snaps at quarterback for Carolina.

==== Week 17: at New York Jets ====
Week 17: Tampa Bay Buccaneers at New York Jets – Game summary

Quarter	1	2	3	4	Total
**Buccaneers**	7	3	7	11	**28**
Jets	7	10	7	0	**24**

at MetLife Stadium, East Rutherford, New Jersey

- Date: January 2
- Game time: 1:00 p.m. EST
- Game weather: Cloudy, 57 °F (14 °C)
- Game attendance: 72,243
- Referee: Alex Kemp
- TV announcers (Fox): Chris Myers, Daryl Johnston and Jen Hale
- Recap, Game Book

Game information

**First quarter**

- NYJ – Braxton Berrios 1-yard run (Eddy Pineiro kick), 12:04. Jets 7–0. **Drive: 6 plays, 72 yards, 2:56.**
- TB – Mike Evans 4-yard pass from Tom Brady (Ryan Succop kick), 5:43. Tied 7–7. **Drive: 13 plays, 75 yards, 6:21.**

**Second quarter**

- NYJ – Braxton Berrios 9-yard pass from Zach Wilson (Eddy Pineiro kick), 13:43. Jets 14–7. **Drive: 13 plays, 74 yards, 7:00.**
- TB – Ryan Succop 39-yard field goal, 10:50. Jets 14–10. **Drive: 7 plays, 54 yards, 2:53.**
- NYJ – Eddy Pineiro 51-yard field goal, 0:01. Jets 17–10. **Drive: 3 plays, 19 yards, 0:15.**

**Third quarter**

- NYJ – Ty Johnson 1-yard run (Eddy Pineiro kick), 6:56. Jets 24–10. **Drive: 9 plays, 66 yards, 5:12.**
- TB – Cameron Brate 4-yard pass from Tom Brady (Ryan Succop kick), 0:29. Jets 24–17. **Drive: 13 plays, 75 yards, 6:27.**

**Fourth quarter**

- TB – Ryan Succop 27-yard field goal, 7:36. Jets 24–20. **Drive: 8 plays, 38 yards, 3:39.**
- TB – Cyril Grayson 33-yard pass from Tom Brady (Le'Veon Bell run), 0:15. Buccaneers 28–24. **Drive: 9 plays, 93 yards, 1:57.**

**Top passers**

- TB – Tom Brady – 34/50, 410 yards, 3 TD, INT
- NYJ – Zach Wilson – 19/33, 234 yards, TD

**Top rushers**

- TB – Ke'Shawn Vaughn – 8 rushes, 31 yards
- NYJ – Michael Carter – 3 rushes, 54 yards

**Top receivers**

- TB – Rob Gronkowski – 7 receptions, 115 yards
- NYJ – Braxton Berrios – 8 receptions, 65 yards, TD

Cyril Grayson's 33-yard touchdown catch from Tom Brady with 15 seconds left in regulation gave the Buccaneers a 28–24 win over the Jets. Tampa Bay beat the Jets on the road for the first time in franchise history, improved to 12–4 on the season, and both surpassed their regular season win total from the year prior as well as tied the Super Bowl-winning 2002 Tampa Bay Buccaneers for the most wins in a single season in franchise history with 12. Brady threw for 410 yards and three touchdowns, and the Buccaneers overcame a 14-point deficit, their largest comeback win of the season. Brady and Zach Wilson (born 22 years apart to the day) set an NFL mark for the largest age gap between starting quarterbacks.

The Jets won the opening coin toss and elected to receive. Quarterback Zach Wilson drove the Jets 72 yards in 6 plays, capped off by a 1-yard direct snap reverse and a Braxton Berrios touchdown. Tampa Bay answered with a 4-yard touchdown pass to Mike Evans and a 7–7 tie. Frustration on offense plagued the Buccaneers for most of the rest of the first half. With New York leading 14–10, the Jets punted to Tampa Bay with 1:01 left in the second quarter. Tom Brady connected with two straight passes to Rob Gronkowski, advancing to the Jets 46-yard line. Brady's deep pass intended for Mike Evans, however, was intercepted by Brandin Echols. The Jets tacked on a field goal by Eddy Piñeiro, and led 17–10 at halftime.

Tampa Bay received the second half kickoff, but an unsportsmanlike conduct penalty on Ryan Jensen, helped stall the drive. Ty Johnson's 1-yard touchdown run gave the Jets a 24–10 lead with 6:56 left in the third, their biggest lead of the game.

The Buccaneers' next possession started out with another costly penalty, this time unnecessary roughness on Ali Marpet. Facing a 3rd & 20 at their own 15, Brady completed to Cyril Grayson, who stepped just on the mark to make, and got a first down to keep the drive alive. Breshad Perriman hauled in a 32-yard grab, then Cameron Brate capped off the drive with a 4-yard touchdown pass on a 4th & Goal. The score was now 24–17 with 29 seconds left in the third quarter.

To start the fourth quarter, the Buccaneers defense held the Jets to a three-and-out on their first two drives. The Jets punted from their own endzone, giving the Buccaneers good field position at the New York 47-yard line. Tampa Bay got to the 9-yard line, but Brady's pass attempt went through the hands of Tyler Johnson near the 1-yard line. The Buccaneers settled for a 27-yard Ryan Succop field goal, and trimmed the deficit to 24–20 with 7:36 remaining.

Zach Wilson drove the Jets down to the Buccaneers 7-yard line. The Jets took over five minutes off the clock, forcing Tampa Bay to use up their timeouts on defense. Facing a 4th & 2 at the Tampa Bay 7, the Jets decided to forego a chip-shot field goal attempt. Wilson attempted a quarterback keeper, but was stuffed for no gain. The Jets turned the ball over on downs. Tampa Bay took over at their 7-yard line with 2:12 left, and no timeouts. Brady made quick completions to Tyler Johnson and Cyril Grayson, moving all the way the Jets 33. Then with 15 seconds left in regulation, Brady found Grayson at the goal line for a 33-yard game-winning touchdown.

At the 3:00 mark of the third quarter, wide receiver Antonio Brown removed his uniform and pads, and left the field. Brown ran down through the endzone, waving to fans, went through the tunnel to the locker room and did not return. Shortly after the game, head coach Bruce Arians announced Brown was "no longer a Buc". The Buccaneers officially terminated Brown's contract four days after the game, on January 6, 2022.

==== Week 18: vs. Carolina Panthers ====
Week 18: Carolina Panthers at Tampa Bay Buccaneers – Game summary

Quarter	1	2	3	4	Total
Panthers	7	0	3	7	**17**
**Buccaneers**	0	10	7	24	**41**

at Raymond James Stadium, Tampa, Florida

- Date: January 9
- Game time: 4:25 p.m. EST
- Game weather: Cloudy, 82 °F (28 °C)
- Game attendance: 65,473
- Referee: Tony Corrente
- TV announcers (CBS): Tom McCarthy, Tony Romo, Tracy Wolfson, and Gene Steratore
- Recap, Game Book

Game information

**First quarter**

- CAR – Chuba Hubbard 2-yard pass from Sam Darnold (Lirim Hajrullahu kick), 7:22. Panthers 7–0. **Drive: 14 plays, 75 yards, 7:38.**

**Second quarter**

- TB – Ryan Succop 39-yard field goal, 11:09. Panthers 7–3. **Drive: 10 plays, 40 yards, 3:51.**
- TB – Le'Veon Bell 1-yard pass from Tom Brady (Ryan Succop kick), 0:15. Buccaneers 10–7. **Drive: 8 plays, 92 yards, 1:33.**

**Third quarter**

- TB – Ke'Shawn Vaughn 2-yard run (Ryan Succop kick), 11:57. Buccaneers 17–7. **Drive: 7 plays, 77 yards, 3:03.**
- CAR – Lirim Hajrullahu 35-yard field goal, 4:44. Buccaneers 17–10. **Drive: 9 plays, 52 yards, 4:42.**

**Fourth quarter**

- TB – Mike Evans 3-yard pass from Tom Brady (Ryan Succop kick), 14:56. Buccaneers 24–10. **Drive: 11 plays, 62 yards, 4:48.**
- CAR – Robby Anderson 19-yard pass from Sam Darnold (Lirim Hajrullahu kick), 10:34. Buccaneers 24–17. **Drive: 8 plays, 56 yards, 4:22.**
- TB – Mike Evans 20-yard pass from Tom Brady (Ryan Succop kick), 7:34. Buccaneers 31–17. **Drive: 6 plays, 75 yards, 3:00.**
- TB – Ryan Succop 40-yard field goal, 5:04. Buccaneers 34–17. **Drive: 4 plays, 5 yards, 1:25.**
- TB – Scotty Miller 33-yard run (Ryan Succop kick), 4:07. Buccaneers 41–17. **Drive: 1 play, 33 yards, 0:10.**

**Top passers**

- CAR – Sam Darnold – 29/42, 219 yards, 2 TD, INT
- TB – Tom Brady – 29/37, 326 yards, 3 TD

**Top rushers**

- CAR – Chuba Hubbard – 9 rushes, 48 yards
- TB – Scotty Miller – 2 rushes, 43 yards, TD

**Top receivers**

- CAR – D. J. Moore – 7 receptions, 87 yards
- TB – Rob Gronkowski – 7 receptions, 137 yards

Tampa Bay swept division rival Carolina, and secured the #2 seed in the NFC playoffs, winning their single-season franchise record 13th regular season game. Quarterback Tom Brady threw for 326 yards and three touchdown passes in the victory. Brady topped 5,000 passing yards on the season, the third time that has been achieved in NFL history, also a single-season franchise record. Mike Evans caught 6 passes for 89 yards, becoming the first player in NFL history with 1,000+ receiving yards in each of his first eight seasons. Once again, several key Buccaneers starters were out due to injury, some resting in hopes of returning for the playoffs.

Tampa Bay got off to a slow start, as Carolina dominated the first quarter. The Panthers opened the game with a nearly 8-minute, 14-play touchdown drive. Sam Darnold's 2-yard touchdown pass to Chuba Hubbard gave Carolina an early 7–0 lead. The Buccaneers went three-and-out on their first possession, holding the ball for less than two minutes. Carolina drove to the Tampa Bay 39, but failed on a 4th & 6, turning the ball over on downs to end the first quarter.

Tampa Bay got on the board with a 39-yard Ryan Succop field goal. The drive was kept alive with a 14-yard catch by Mike Evans on a 4th & 2 at the Carolina 39. On the subsequent drive, Darnold drove the Panthers to the red zone once again. Facing a 4th & 1 at the 2-yard line, Darnold's quarterback sneak was stuffed for no gain, and the Panthers again turned the ball over on downs. Later in the quarter, inside the two minute warning, Brady swiftly drove the Buccaneers 92 yards in 8 plays. Tampa Bay took a 10–7 lead after Brady's 1-yard touchdown pass to Le'Veon Bell.

The Buccaneers routed the Panthers in the second half. Ke'Shawn Vaughn scored on a 2-yard touchdown run to open the third quarter, and Mike Evans had two touchdown catches in the fourth quarter. With Tampa Bay leading 31–17 with 6:38 to go, Sam Darnold's quarterback scramble saw him fumble the ball away, the game's first turnover. Tampa Bay added a field goal for a 34–17 margin. The Panthers went four-and-out giving the ball right back to the Buccaneers at the 33-yard line. In one play, Scotty Miller took a reverse, and turned it up field for a 33-yard touchdown run, to stretch the lead to 41–17. On the next play from scrimmage, Andrew Adams intercepted Darnold, the game's second turnover. Tampa Bay failed to score any additional points, but held on for a 41–17 victory.

Minutes after Tampa Bay's game concluded, the Rams lost to the 49ers in overtime, effectively placing the Buccaneers in the #2 seed in the NFC playoff field.

=== Standings ===
==== Division ====
NFC South
	W	L	T	PCT	DIV	CONF	PF	PA	STK
^{(2)} Tampa Bay Buccaneers	13	4	0	.765	4–2	8–4	511	353	W3
New Orleans Saints	9	8	0	.529	4–2	7–5	364	335	W2
Atlanta Falcons	7	10	0	.412	2–4	4–8	313	459	L2
Carolina Panthers	5	12	0	.294	2–4	3–9	304	404	L7

==== Conference ====
NFC
#	Team	Division	W	L	T	PCT	DIV	CONF	SOS	SOV	STK
**Division winners**
1 (Note: Green Bay finished ahead of Tampa Bay based on conference record (9–3 vs. 8–4), claiming the No. 1 seed.)	Green Bay Packers	North	13	4	0	.765	4–2	9–3	.479	.480	L1
2	Tampa Bay Buccaneers	South	13	4	0	.765	4–2	8–4	.467	.443	W3
3 (Note: Dallas claimed the No. 3 seed over LA Rams based on conference record (10–2 vs. 8–4).)	Dallas Cowboys	East	12	5	0	.706	6–0	10–2	.488	.431	W1
4	Los Angeles Rams	West	12	5	0	.706	3–3	8–4	.483	.409	L1
**Wild cards**
5	Arizona Cardinals	West	11	6	0	.647	4–2	7–5	.490	.492	L1
6	San Francisco 49ers	West	10	7	0	.588	2–4	7–5	.500	.438	W2
7 (Note: Philadelphia finished ahead of New Orleans based on head-to-head victory, claiming the 7th and final playoff spot.)	Philadelphia Eagles	East	9	8	0	.529	3–3	7–5	.469	.350	L1
**Did not qualify for the postseason**
8	New Orleans Saints	South	9	8	0	.529	4–2	7–5	.512	.516	W2
9	Minnesota Vikings	North	8	9	0	.471	4–2	6–6	.507	.434	W1
10 (Note: Washington finished ahead of Atlanta and Seattle based on head-to-head victories.)	Washington Football Team	East	7	10	0	.412	2–4	6–6	.529	.420	W1
11 (Note: Seattle finished ahead of Atlanta based on win percentage in common games (4–2 vs. 3–3 against: San Francisco, New Orleans, Jacksonville, Washington, and Detroit).)	Seattle Seahawks	West	7	10	0	.412	3–3	4–8	.519	.424	W2
12	Atlanta Falcons	South	7	10	0	.412	2–4	4–8	.472	.315	L2
13	Chicago Bears	North	6	11	0	.353	2–4	4–8	.524	.373	L1
14	Carolina Panthers	South	5	12	0	.294	2–4	3–9	.509	.412	L7
15	New York Giants	East	4	13	0	.235	1–5	3–9	.536	.485	L6
16	Detroit Lions	North	3	13	1	.206	2–4	3–9	.528	.627	W1
**Tiebreakers** (Note: When breaking ties for three or more teams under the NFL's rules, they are first broken within divisions, then comparing only the highest-ranked remaining team from each division.)

== Postseason ==
Round	Date	Opponent (seed)	Result	Record	Venue	Recap
Wild Card	January 16	Philadelphia Eagles (7)	W 31–15	1–0	Raymond James Stadium	Recap
Divisional	January 23	Los Angeles Rams (4)	L 27–30	1–1	Raymond James Stadium	Recap

=== Game summaries ===
==== NFC Wild Card Playoffs: vs. (7) Philadelphia Eagles ====
NFC Wild Card Playoffs: (7) Philadelphia Eagles vs. (2) Tampa Bay Buccaneers – Game summary

Quarter	1	2	3	4	Total
Eagles	0	0	0	15	15
Buccaneers	14	3	14	0	31

at Raymond James Stadium, Tampa, Florida

- Date: January 16, 2022
- Game time: 1:05 p.m. EST
- Game weather: Cloudy, 65 °F (18 °C)
- Game attendance: 65,077
- Referee: Craig Wrolstad
- TV announcers (Fox): Joe Buck, Troy Aikman, Erin Andrews, and Tom Rinaldi
- Recap, Game Book

Game information

First quarter

- TB – Giovani Bernard 2-yard run (Ryan Succop kick), 10:00. Buccaneers 7–0. Drive: 12 plays, 75 yards, 5:00.
- TB – Ke'Shawn Vaughn 1-yard run (Ryan Succop kick), 0:25. Buccaneers 14–0. Drive: 10 plays, 70 yards, 4:00.

Second quarter

- TB – Ryan Succop 34-yard field goal, 9:16. Buccaneers 17–0. Drive: 11 plays, 53 yards, 4:52.

Third quarter

- TB – Rob Gronkowski 2-yard pass from Tom Brady (Ryan Succop kick), 7:38. Buccaneers 24–0. Drive: 5 plays, 48 yards, 2:57.
- TB – Mike Evans 36-yard pass from Tom Brady (Ryan Succop kick), 5:18. Buccaneers 31–0. Drive: 1 play, 36 yards, 0:07.

Fourth quarter

- PHI – Boston Scott 34-yard run (Jake Elliott kick), 12:08. Buccaneers 31–7. Drive: 2 plays, 65 yards, 0:40.
- PHI – Kenneth Gainwell 16-yard pass from Jalen Hurts (Jalen Hurts–DeVonta Smith pass), 4:45. Buccaneers 31–15. Drive: 10 plays, 93 yards, 4:16.

Top passers

- PHI – Jalen Hurts – 23/43, 258 yards, TD, 2 INT
- TB – Tom Brady – 29/37, 271 yards, 2 TD

Top rushers

- PHI – Jalen Hurts – 8 rushes, 39 yards
- TB – Ke'Shawn Vaughn – 17 rushes, 53 yards, TD

Top receivers

- PHI – Dallas Goedert – 6 receptions, 92 yards
- TB – Mike Evans – 9 receptions, 117 yards, TD

Tampa Bay jumped out to a 31–0 lead by the fourth quarter on the way to their fifth consecutive postseason win over the last two seasons. For 44-year-old Bucs quarterback Tom Brady, it was his 35th career playoff win.

The Buccaneers started out the game with a 12-play, 75-yard drive to go up 7–0 on Giovani Bernard's 2-yard touchdown run. After the next three possessions ended in punts, Brady completed 5 of 6 passes for 62 yards on a 70-yard drive that ended with Ke'Shawn Vaughn's 1-yard score, putting the Bucs ahead 14–0 with 25 seconds left in the first quarter. The Eagles had to punt again, and Tampa Bay drove back for more points, this time moving the ball 53 yards in 11 plays to take a 17–0 lead with Ryan Succop's 34-yard field goal.

Philadelphia responded with their most promising drive of the day, moving the ball to the Buccaneers 37-yard line, only to lose the ball with incomplete pass on 4th and 5. Then after a punt, they drove to the Tampa Bay's 27. But once again they failed to score as defensive back Mike Edwards intercepted Jalen Hurts' pass in the end zone.

Both teams punted on their first possession of the second half, but on the Buccaneers punt, Jalen Reagor muffed the kick and Ross Cockrell recovered the ball for Tampa Bay on the Eagles 48-yard line. Brady started off the next drive with a screen pass to Bernard that picked up 21 yards, and eventually finished it with a 2-yard touchdown toss to tight end Rob Gronkowski, increasing the lead to 24–0. Then linebacker Shaq Barrett intercepted a pass from Hurts and returned it 17 yards to the Eagles 36-yard line, where Brady gave the Bucs a 31–0 lead with a touchdown pass to Mike Evans on the next play.

Philadelphia finally managed to get on the board early in the fourth quarter after Reagor returned a punt 31 yards to the Eagles 35-yard line. Hurts completed a 31-yard pass to DeVonta Smith on the next play, and then Boston Scott scored on a 34-yard touchdown run. Then after a punt, Hurts completed 7 of 9 passes for 81 yards and rushed for 6 on a 93-yard drive that ended with his 16-yard touchdown pass to running back Kenneth Gainwell. Hurts then completed a pass to Smith for a two-point conversion to make the score 31–15, but any chance of a comeback was snuffed out when the Bucs recovered Philadelphia's onside kick attempt.

Brady completed 29 of 37 passes for 271 yards and two touchdowns. Evans caught 9 passes for 117 yards and a score. Bernard rushed for 44 yards and a touchdown, while also catching 5 passes for 39 yards. Hurts finished the game 23/43 for 258 yards and a touchdown, with 2 interceptions, along with 8 carries for 39 yards. Tight end Dallas Goedert was his top target with 6 catches for 92 yards.

==== NFC Divisional Playoffs: vs. (4) Los Angeles Rams ====
NFC Divisional Playoffs: (4) Los Angeles Rams at (2) Tampa Bay Buccaneers – Game summary

Quarter	1	2	3	4	Total
Rams	10	10	7	3	30
Buccaneers	3	0	10	14	27

at Raymond James Stadium, Tampa, Florida

- Date: January 23, 2022
- Game time: 3:00 p.m. EST
- Game weather: Cloudy, 52 °F (11 °C)
- Game attendance: 65,597
- Referee: Shawn Hochuli
- TV announcers (NBC): Al Michaels, Cris Collinsworth, Michele Tafoya, and Kathryn Tappen
- Recap, Game Book

Game information

First quarter

- LAR – Matt Gay 26-yard field goal, 8:01. Rams 3–0. Drive: 9 plays, 72 yards, 4:44.
- LAR – Kendall Blanton 7-yard pass from Matthew Stafford (Matt Gay kick), 3:28. Rams 10–0. Drive: 7 plays, 71 yards, 3:47.
- TB – Ryan Succop 45-yard field goal, 0:32. Rams 10–3. Drive: 6 plays, 48 yards, 2:56.

Second quarter

- LAR – Cooper Kupp 70-yard pass from Matthew Stafford (Matt Gay kick), 14:17. Rams 17–3. Drive: 3 plays, 60 yards, 1:15.
- LAR – Matt Gay 40-yard field goal, 2:19. Rams 20–3. Drive: 12 plays, 41 yards, 6:41.

Third quarter

- LAR – Matthew Stafford 1-yard run (Matt Gay kick), 7:07. Rams 27–3. Drive: 6 plays, 28 yards, 3:18.
- TB – Ryan Succop 31-yard field goal, 3:02. Rams 27–6. Drive: 10 plays, 62 yards, 4:05.
- TB – Leonard Fournette 1-yard run (Ryan Succop kick), 0:12. Rams 27–13. Drive: 7 plays, 30 yards, 2:33.

Fourth quarter

- TB – Mike Evans 55-yard pass from Tom Brady (Ryan Succop kick), 3:20. Rams 27–20. Drive: 3 plays, 77 yards, 0:36.
- TB – Leonard Fournette 9-yard run (Ryan Succop kick), 0:42. Tied 27–27. Drive: 7 plays, 30 yards, 1:43.
- LAR – Matt Gay 40-yard field goal, 0:00. Rams 30–27. Drive: 5 plays, 63 yards, 0:42.

Top passers

- LAR – Matthew Stafford – 28/38, 366 yards, 2 TD
- TB – Tom Brady – 30/54, 329 yards, TD, INT

Top rushers

- LAR – Cam Akers – 24 rushes, 48 yards
- TB – Leonard Fournette – 13 rushes, 51 yards, 2 TD

Top receivers

- LAR – Cooper Kupp – 9 receptions, 183 yards, TD
- TB – Mike Evans – 8 receptions, 119 yards, TD

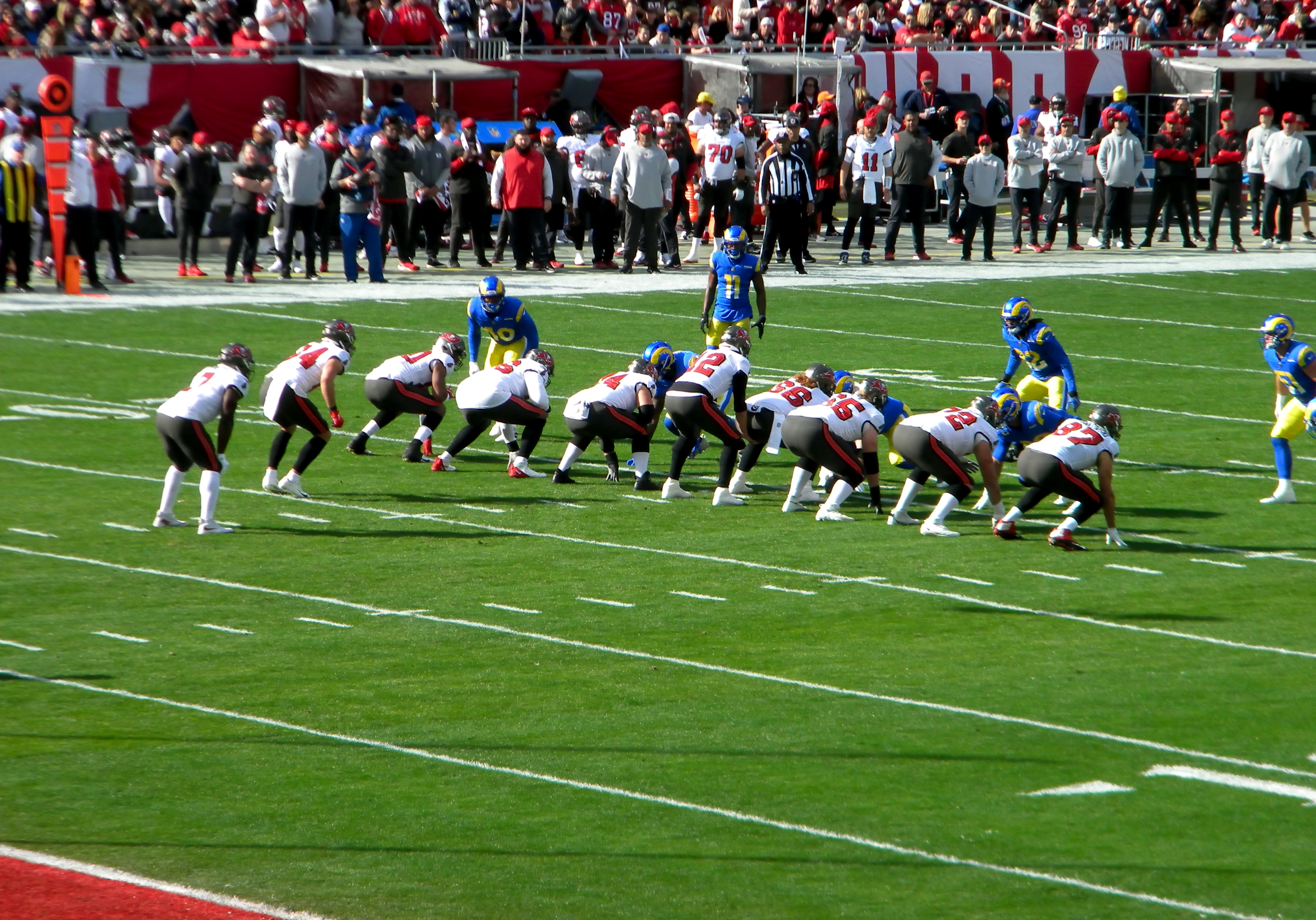
Game action during the Buccaneers–Rams NFC Divisional playoff game.

The Buccaneers' hopes of a second consecutive Super Bowl appearance came to an end at the hands of the fourth-seeded Los Angeles Rams, who upset the defending champions on a last-second 30-yard field goal by kicker Matt Gay. Los Angeles built a 27–3 lead, but Tampa Bay rallied to score 24 unanswered points and tied the game with 42 seconds remaining in regulation. The Rams swept the Buccaneers, having also defeated them during the regular season, and ultimately advanced to Super Bowl LVI.

Gay converted field goals of 26 and 40 yards in the first and second quarters, respectively, while quarterback Matthew Stafford threw touchdown passes of 7 yards to tight end Kendall Blanton and 70 yards to wide receiver Cooper Kupp to put the Rams ahead late in the first half. Late in the second quarter, cornerback Nick Scott intercepted a pass by Tom Brady, setting up the Rams deep in Tampa Bay territory. However, running back Cam Akers, making his first start of the season, was stripped of the ball at the Tampa Bay 1-yard line with 24 seconds left to leave the score 20–3 at halftime.

Stafford added a 1-yard touchdown sneak to put the Rams up 27–3 midway through the third quarter, their largest lead of the day. Trailing by 24, the Buccaneers scored on a Ryan Succop field goal with 3:06 left in the third quarter. On the first play of the next possession, Cooper Kupp fumbled away the ball, and it was recovered by Tampa Bay. This led to a 1-yard touchdown run by Leonard Fournette, and the score was now 27–13 at the end of the third quarter.

The Rams squandered opportunities to put the game away, going three-and-out to start the fourth quarter. On the next possession, linebacker Von Miller's strip sack of Brady gave Los Angeles the ball Tampa Bay 25. But they gave the ball right back to the Buccaneers with an errant shotgun snap on the next play from scrimmage. Later in the fourth quarter, the Rams missed another scoring opportunity as Gay came up short on a 45-yard field goal attempt with 6:36 remaining.

Following another exchange of punts, Brady threw a 55-yard touchdown pass to wide receiver Mike Evans to trim the score to 27–20 with 3:27 left in regulation. The Buccaneers were out of timeouts, and elected not to attempt an onside kick, and kicked off to the Rams. On the second play of the drive, Akers was stripped of the ball by Ndamukong Suh and fumbled for the second time during the game. Tampa Bay recovered the ball at the Los Angeles 30-yard line with 2:25 left. Seven plays later, facing a 4th & inches at the 9-yard line – with many expecting a quarterback sneak – Brady instead gave a handoff to Leonard Fournette who broke to the right untouched for a 9-yard touchdown. With 42 seconds left in regulation, the Buccaneers tied the score at 27–27.

Stafford shrugged off a first-down sack and connected with Cooper Kupp for a 20-yard gain to the 44-yard line. Stafford and Kupp hooked up on the very next play for a 44-yard bomb over the middle as Kupp (9 receptions, 183 yards) beat Buccaneers free safety Antoine Winfield Jr. in single coverage all the way down to the Tampa Bay 12. Stafford then spiked the ball with four seconds remaining to set up Gay's winning kick. It was the Buccaneers' third loss in as many postseason meetings with the Rams, the last two occurring in NFC Championship Games in 1979 and 1999. With the crushing 30–27 loss, Tampa Bay finished with a total combined record of 14–5, including the postseason.

== Statistics ==
=== Team ===
Category	Total yards	Yards per game	NFL rank (out of 32)
Passing offense	5,229	307.6	1st
Rushing offense	1,672	98.4	26th
Total offense	6,901	405.9	2nd
Passing defense	4,062	238.9	21st
Rushing defense	1,573	92.5	3rd
Total defense	5,635	331.5	13th

=== Individual ===
Category	Player	Total yards
Offense
Passing	Tom Brady	5,316
Rushing	Leonard Fournette	812
Receiving	Chris Godwin	1,103
Defense
Tackles (Solo)	Devin White	87
Sacks	Shaquil Barrett	10
Interceptions	Mike Edwards	3

Statistics correct as of the end of the 2021 NFL season

== Awards ==
- NFC Offensive Player of the Week
  - Week 5: Tom Brady
  - Week 12: Leonard Fournette
- NFC Defensive Player of the Week
  - Week 2: Mike Edwards
- NFC Special Teams Player of the Week
  - Week 1: Bradley Pinion
- FedEx Air Player of the Week/Year
  - Week 1: Tom Brady
  - Week 2: Tom Brady
  - Week 18: Tom Brady
  - Player of the year: Tom Brady
- Nickelodeon Valuable Player
  - Week 2: Tom Brady
  - Week 12: Leonard Fournette
