= K. J. Britt =

American football player (born 1999)

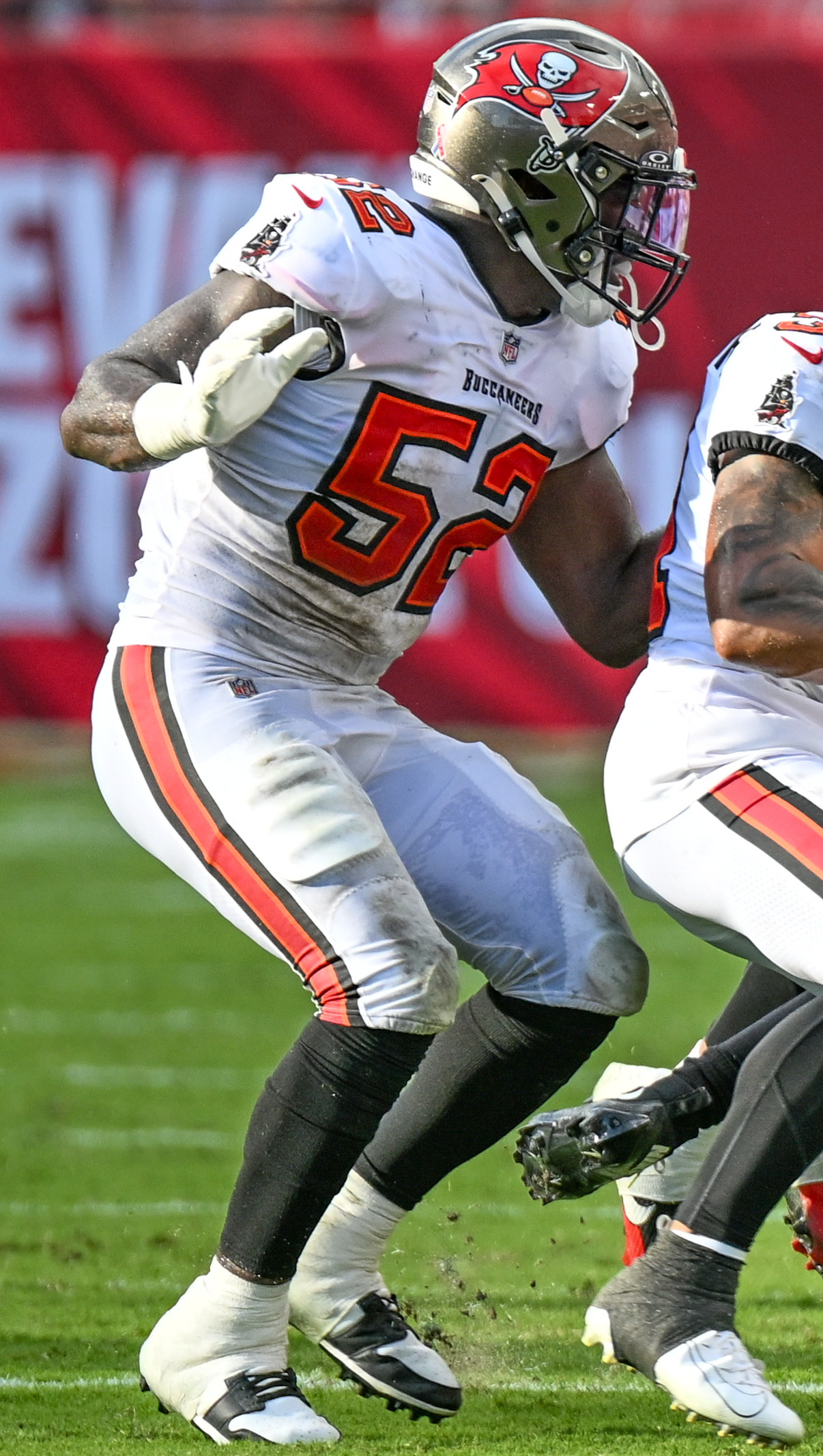
- Britt with the Tampa Bay Buccaneers in 2024

No. 40 – Detroit Lions
- Position: Linebacker
- Roster status: Active

Personal information
- Born: June 4, 1999 (age 27); Oxford, Alabama, U.S.
- Listed height: 6 ft 0 in (1.83 m)
- Listed weight: 240 lb (109 kg)

Career information
- High school: Oxford
- College: Auburn (2017–2020)
- NFL draft: 2021: 5th round, 176th overall pick

Career history
- Tampa Bay Buccaneers (2021–2024); Miami Dolphins (2025); New England Patriots (2026); Detroit Lions (2026–present)

Awards and highlights
- First-team All-SEC (2019)

Career NFL statistics as of Week 10, 2026
- Total tackles: 167
- Sacks: 0.5
- Pass deflections: 3
- Stats at Pro Football Reference

K. J. Britt (born June 4, 1999) is an American professional football linebacker for the Detroit Lions of the National Football League (NFL). He played college football for the Auburn Tigers. Britt was selected by the Tampa Bay Buccaneers in the fifth round of the 2021 NFL Draft.

== Early life ==
Britt attended Oxford High School. He was the number 299th ranked recruit in the country and the number 14th ranked inside linebacker. Britt committed to Auburn over offers from Ole Miss and Georgia.

== College career ==
While at Auburn, Britt received minimal playing time as a freshman and served as a rotational piece as a sophomore recording 21 total tackles. In 2019 as a junior he broke out, recording 68 total tackled and was awarded All-Southeastern Conference First-team honors. As a senior, Britt missed all but two games due to a thumb injury.

== Professional career ==
Pre-draft measurables
| Height | Weight | Arm length | Hand span | Wingspan | 40-yard dash | 10-yard split | 20-yard split | 20-yard shuttle | Three-cone drill | Vertical jump | Broad jump | Bench press |
|---|---|---|---|---|---|---|---|---|---|---|---|---|
| 6 ft 0 1/2 in (1.84 m) | 235 lb (107 kg) | 31 in (0.79 m) | 9 1/4 in (0.23 m) | 6 ft 3 1/2 in (1.92 m) | 4.76 s | 1.68 s | 2.75 s | 4.40 s | 7.38 s | 32.5 in (0.83 m) | 9 ft 10 in (3.00 m) | 24 reps |
All values from Pro Day

=== Tampa Bay Buccaneers ===
Britt was selected by the Tampa Bay Buccaneers in the fifth round, 176th overall, of the 2021 NFL draft. He signed his four-year rookie contract on May 13, 2021.

On October 25, 2022, Britt was placed on injured reserve. He was activated on December 10.

=== Miami Dolphins ===
On March 17, 2025, Britt signed a one-year contract with the Miami Dolphins.

=== New England Patriots ===
On March 16, 2026, Britt signed a one-year, $1.4 million contract with the New England Patriots. On August 31, he was released by New England. On September 1, the Patriots re–signed Britt to their practice squad.

=== Detroit Lions ===
On November 2, 2026, Britt was signed to the Detroit Lions active roster from the New England Patriots practice squad.

== NFL career statistics ==
Legend
| **Bold** | Career high |

=== Regular season ===
| Year | Team | Games | | Tackles | | | | | Interceptions | | | | | | Fumbles | | | | |
| Year | Team | GP | GS | Cmb | Solo | Ast | Sck | TFL | Int | Yds | Avg | Lng | TD | PD | FF | Fmb | FR | Yds | TD |
|---|---|---|---|---|---|---|---|---|---|---|---|---|---|---|---|---|---|---|---|
| 2021 | TB | 17 | 0 | 12 | 7 | 5 | 0.0 | 1 | 0 | 0 | 0.0 | 0 | 0 | **1** | 0 | 0 | 0 | 0 | 0 |
| 2022 | TB | 12 | 0 | 13 | 5 | 8 | 0.0 | 0 | 0 | 0 | 0.0 | 0 | 0 | 0 | 0 | 0 | 0 | 0 | 0 |
| 2023 | TB | 16 | 4 | 29 | 16 | 13 | 0.0 | 1 | 0 | 0 | 0.0 | 0 | 0 | **1** | 0 | 0 | 0 | 0 | 0 |
| 2024 | TB | 14 | 11 | **72** | **40** | **32** | **0.5** | **2** | 0 | 0 | 0.0 | 0 | 0 | **1** | 0 | 0 | 0 | 0 | 0 |
| 2025 | MIA | 17 | 1 | 35 | 12 | 23 | 0.0 | 0 | 0 | 0 | 0.0 | 0 | 0 | 0 | 0 | 0 | 0 | 0 | 0 |
| 2026 | NWE | 1 | 0 | 1 | 1 | 0 | 0.0 | 0 | 0 | 0 | 0.0 | 0 | 0 | 0 | 0 | 0 | 0 | 0 | 0 |
| 2026 | DET | 2 | 0 | 5 | 4 | 1 | 0.0 | 0 | 0 | 0 | 0.0 | 0 | 0 | 0 | 0 | 0 | 0 | 0 | 0 |
| Career | | 79 | 16 | 167 | 85 | 82 | 0.5 | 4 | 0 | 0 | 0.0 | 0 | 0 | 3 | 0 | 0 | 0 | 0 | 0 |

=== Postseason ===
| Year | Team | Games | | Tackles | | | | | Interceptions | | | | | | Fumbles | | | | |
| Year | Team | GP | GS | Cmb | Solo | Ast | Sck | TFL | Int | Yds | Avg | Lng | TD | PD | FF | Fmb | FR | Yds | TD |
|---|---|---|---|---|---|---|---|---|---|---|---|---|---|---|---|---|---|---|---|
| 2021 | TB | 2 | 0 | 1 | 1 | 0 | 0.0 | 0 | 0 | 0 | 0.0 | 0 | 0 | 0 | 0 | 0 | 0 | 0 | 0 |
| 2022 | TB | 1 | 0 | 1 | 0 | 1 | 0.0 | 0 | 0 | 0 | 0.0 | 0 | 0 | 0 | 0 | 0 | 0 | 0 | 0 |
| 2023 | TB | 2 | 2 | **15** | **7** | **8** | 0.0 | **1** | 0 | 0 | 0.0 | 0 | 0 | **1** | 0 | 0 | 0 | 0 | 0 |
| 2024 | TB | 1 | 0 | 5 | 3 | 2 | 0.0 | 0 | 0 | 0 | 0.0 | 0 | 0 | 0 | 0 | 0 | 0 | 0 | 0 |
| Career | | 6 | 2 | 22 | 11 | 11 | 0.0 | 1 | 0 | 0 | 0.0 | 0 | 0 | 1 | 0 | 0 | 0 | 0 | 0 |
