= Pat O'Connor (American football) =

American football player (born 1993)

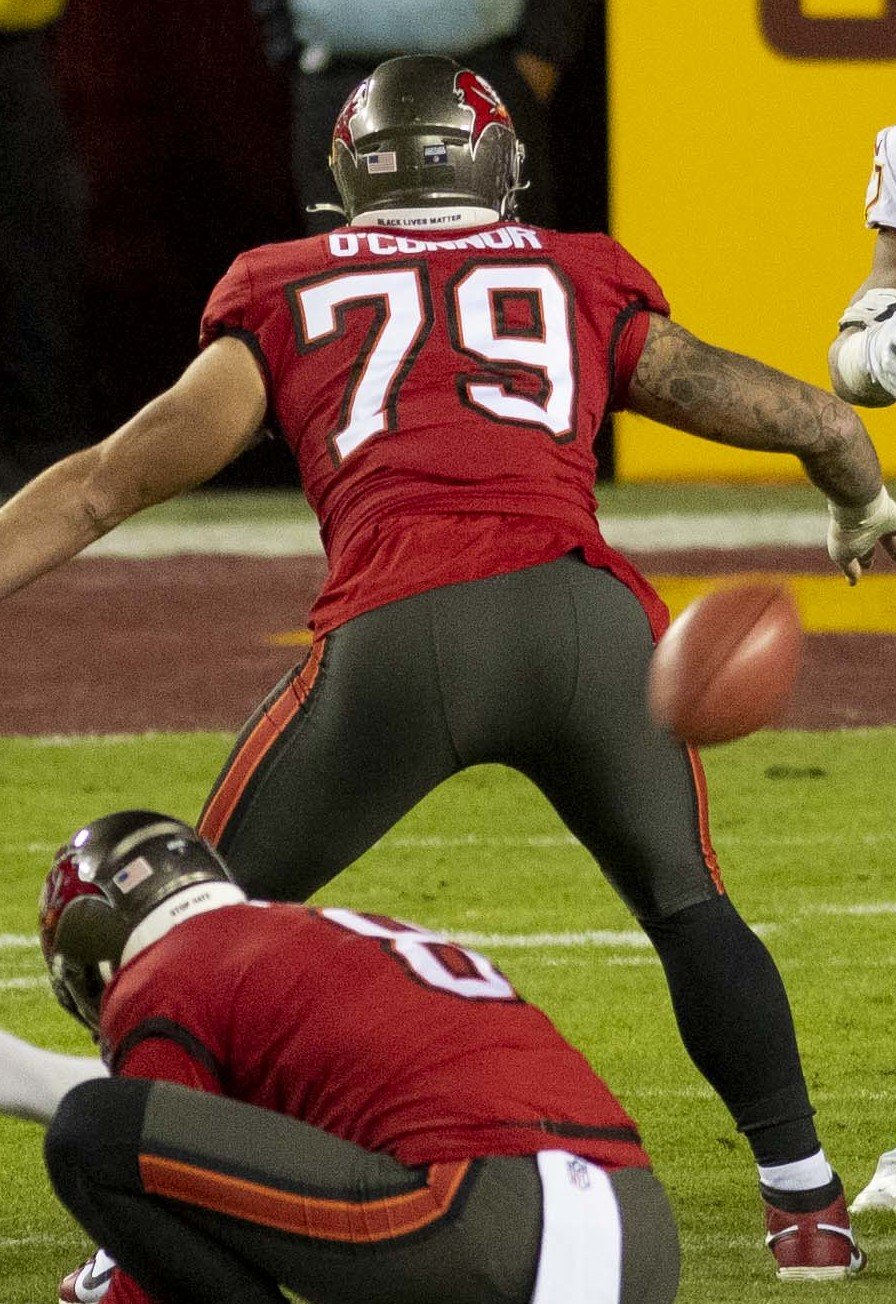
- O'Connor with the Tampa Bay Buccaneers in 2021

No. 79, 50, 95
- Position: Defensive end

Personal information
- Born: November 1, 1993 (age 33); Chicago, Illinois, U.S.
- Listed height: 6 ft 4 in (1.93 m)
- Listed weight: 300 lb (136 kg)

Career information
- High school: St. Rita (Chicago)
- College: Eastern Michigan (2012–2016)
- NFL draft: 2017: 7th round, 250th overall pick

Career history
- Detroit Lions (2017)*; Tampa Bay Buccaneers (2017–2023); Detroit Lions (2024–2025)
- * Offseason or practice squad member only

Awards and highlights
- Super Bowl champion (LV); 2× First-team All-MAC (2014, 2016)

Career NFL statistics
- Total tackles: 52
- Sacks: 2.5
- Pass deflections: 1
- Stats at Pro Football Reference

Patrick Joseph O'Connor (born November 1, 1993) is an American former professional football player who was a defensive end in the National Football League (NFL) for the Tampa Bay Buccaneers and Detroit Lions from 2017 to 2025. He played college football for the Eastern Michigan Eagles.

== College career ==
O'Connor recorded 42 tackles and 8.5 sacks as a senior playing for Eastern Michigan University. He recorded 166 total tackles and 20 sacks primarily playing the defensive end position in college, and was noted for his work ethic. He was named to the All-Mid-American Conference team in 2016.

== Professional career ==
Pre-draft measurables
Height	Weight	Arm length	Hand span	Wingspan	40-yard dash	10-yard split	20-yard split	20-yard shuttle	Three-cone drill	Vertical jump	Broad jump	Bench press
6 ft 4 1/2 in (1.94 m)	277 lb (126 kg)	32 3/4 in (0.83 m)	9 5/8 in (0.24 m)	6 ft 9 in (2.06 m)	4.84 s	1.62 s	2.75 s	4.36 s	7.34 s	31.0 in (0.79 m)	9 ft 6 in (2.90 m)	17 reps
All values from Pro Day

=== Detroit Lions ===
The Detroit Lions selected O’Connor in the seventh round with the 250th overall pick in the 2017 NFL draft. On May 12, 2017, the Lions signed O'Connor to a four-year, $2.46 million contract with a signing bonus of $64,270. He was waived on September 2, and was re–signed to the Lions' practice squad the next day. O'Connor was released by the team on September 13.

=== Tampa Bay Buccaneers ===
On October 9, 2017, O'Connor was signed to the Tampa Bay Buccaneers' practice squad. He was promoted to the active roster on November 29.

On September 1, 2018, O'Connor was waived by the Buccaneers and was re-signed to the practice squad. He signed a reserve/future contract with the Buccaneers on December 31.

On September 2, 2019, O'Connor was waived by the Buccaneers and re-signed to the practice squad. He was promoted to the active roster on September 24.

In Week 14 against the Minnesota Vikings in 2020, O'Connor recorded his first career sack on Kirk Cousins during the 26–14 win. O'Connor played in all four games in the Buccaneers' playoff run that resulted in the team winning Super Bowl LV.

O'Connor was given an exclusive-rights free agent tender by the Buccaneers on March 9, 2021. He entrenched himself as a core special teams player for the Buccaneers in 2021. He suffered a knee injury in Week 15 and was placed on injured reserve on December 21. On March 15, 2022, the Buccaneers announced they would not tender O'Conner.

On April 12, 2022, the Buccaneers re-signed O'Connor to a one-year contract.

On August 29, 2023, O'Connor was released by the Buccaneers and re-signed to the practice squad. He was promoted to the active roster on September 20. O'Connor was released on October 31 and re-signed to the practice squad. He was promoted to the active roster on December 1.

=== Detroit Lions (second stint) ===
On August 1, 2024, O’Connor signed with the Lions. He was released on August 27, and re-signed to the practice squad. He was promoted to the active roster on October 19.

On March 18, 2025, the Lions re-signed O'Connor to a one-year contract. He was placed on injured reserve on November 14, and released the next day. O'Connor was re-signed to the practice squad on December 8.

O'Connor announced his retirement from the NFL after nine seasons via Instagram on July 16, 2026.
