= 2023 Tampa Bay Buccaneers season =

48th season in franchise history

- Owner: The Glazer family
- General manager: Jason Licht
- Head coach: Todd Bowles
- Offensive coordinator: Dave Canales
- Home stadium: Raymond James Stadium

Results
- Record: 9–8
- Division place: 1st NFC South
- Playoffs: Won Wild Card Playoffs (vs. Eagles) 32–9; Lost Divisional Playoffs (at Lions) 23–31
- All-Pros: S Antoine Winfield Jr. (1st team); WR Mike Evans (2nd team)
- Pro Bowlers: WR Mike Evans; QB Baker Mayfield; T Tristan Wirfs

Uniform
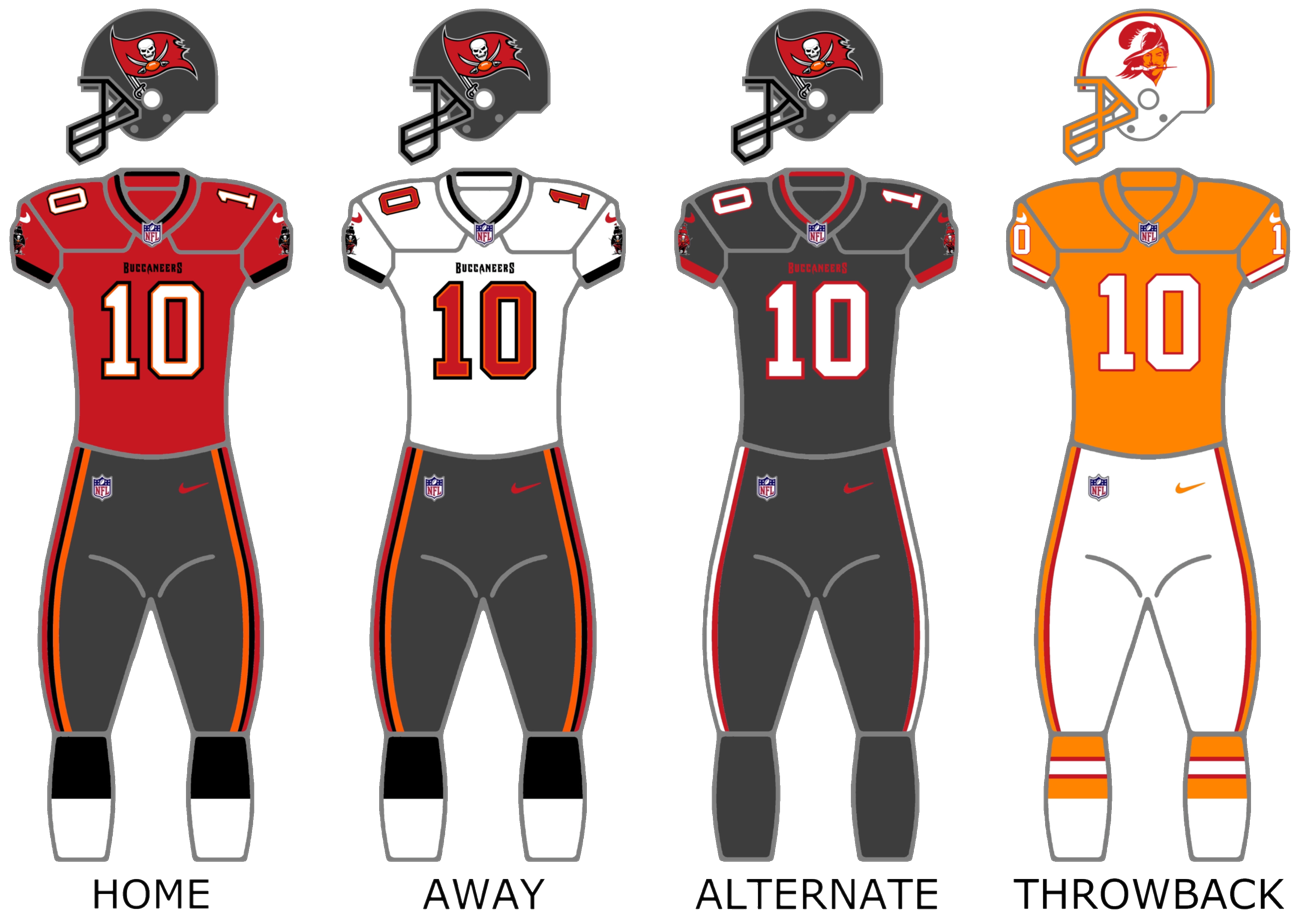

The 2023 season was the Tampa Bay Buccaneers' 48th in the National Football League (NFL), their tenth under the leadership of general manager Jason Licht and their second under head coach Todd Bowles.

Tampa Bay improved on their 8–9 record from the previous season, and finished with a 9–8 record to win their third consecutive NFC South division title, a franchise best streak. They also made the playoffs for the fourth consecutive season, matching a franchise-best streak from 1999–2002.

This was their first season since 2019 without quarterback Tom Brady, after he announced his second retirement from the NFL on February 1, 2023. On March 15, the Buccaneers signed free agent quarterback Baker Mayfield, who subsequently earned the starting job during training camp. For the first time since 2012, Tampa Bay wore their orange throwback uniforms. The Buccaneers donned their "Creamsicle" jerseys and "Bucco Bruce" helmets against Detroit in Week 6.

Tampa Bay got off to a surprising 3–1 start, and sat in first place in the NFC South during their bye in Week 5. After their bye week, however, they lost six out of their next seven games, including a four-game losing streak to quickly slip to 4–7. The Buccaneers rebounded, winning five out of their last six games and won the tie-breaker against division rival New Orleans to clinch the division.

In the playoffs, the Buccaneers hosted the defending NFC champion Philadelphia in the Wild Card Round, a rematch of the Week 3 meeting. Tampa Bay won in a blowout 32–9 victory. They would end up losing in the Divisional Round against the Detroit Lions, in a fairly close 31–23 loss.

The Tampa Bay Buccaneers drew an average home attendance of 63,756 in 8 home games in the 2023 NFL season, the 28th highest in the league.

== Draft ==
2023 Tampa Bay Buccaneers draft selections
Round	Selection	Player	Position	College	Notes
1	19	Calijah Kancey	DT	Pittsburgh	
2	48	Cody Mauch	OT	North Dakota State	From Lions via Packers (Note: The Buccaneers traded second- and sixth-round selections (50th and 179th overall) to the Green Bay Packers in exchange for a second-round selection (45th overall).)
2	50	Traded to the Green Bay Packers			
3	82	YaYa Diaby	DE	Louisville	
4	121	Traded to the Jacksonville Jaguars (Note: The Buccaneers traded a fourth-round selection (121st overall) to the Jacksonville Jaguars in exchange for 2022 fifth- and seventh-round selections.)			
5	153	SirVocea Dennis	LB	Pittsburgh	
5	171	Payne Durham	TE	Purdue	Compensatory selection; from Rams (Note: The Buccaneers traded fifth- and seventh-round selections (175th and 252nd overall) to the Los Angeles Rams traded a fifth-round selection (171st overall).)
5	175	Traded to the Los Angeles Rams			Compensatory selection
6	179	Traded to the Green Bay Packers			From Texans (Note: The Buccaneers traded a seventh-round selection (230th overall) and G Shaq Mason to the Houston Texans traded a sixth-round selection (179th overall).)
6	181	Josh Hayes	CB	Kansas State	From Colts (Note: The Buccaneers traded a seventh-round selection (236th overall) and LB Grant Stuard to the Indianapolis Colts in exchange for a sixth-round selection (181st overall).)
6	191	Trey Palmer	WR	Nebraska	From Packers via Rams, Texans and Eagles (Note: The Buccaneers traded a 2024 fifth-round selection to the Philadelphia Eagles in exchange for a sixth-round selection (191st overall).)
6	196	Jose Ramirez	DE	Eastern Michigan	
7	230	Traded to the Houston Texans			From Jets (Note: The Buccaneers traded a 2022 sixth-round selection to the New York Jets in exchange for a seventh-round selection (230th overall) and NT Steve McLendon.)
7	236	Traded to the Indianapolis Colts			

2023 Tampa Bay Buccaneers undrafted free agents
Name	Position	College	Ref.
Jeremy Banks	LB	Tennessee	
Taye Barber	WR	TCU	
Brandon Bouyer-Randle	LB	UConn	
Ronnie Brown	RB	Shepherd	
Evans Deckers	LS	Duke	
Silas Dzansi	OT	Virginia Tech	
Luke Haggard	OT	Indiana	
Keenan Isaac	CB	Alabama State	
Christian Izien	S	Rutgers	
Rakim Jarrett	WR	Maryland	
Nelson Mbanasor	DE	Texas State	
Kaevon Merriweather	S	Iowa	
Ryan Miller	WR	Furman	
Chris Murray	C	Oklahoma	
Raiqwon O'Neal	OT	UCLA	
Derrek Pitts	CB	NC State	
Tanner Taula	TE	Illinois State	
Sean Tucker	RB	Syracuse	
Kade Warner	WR	Kansas State	
Markees Watts	OLB	Charlotte	
Kedrick Whitehead	S	Delaware	

Draft trades

== Staff ==
2023 Tampa Bay Buccaneers staff
Front office: Co-owner/president – Darcie Glazer Kassewitz; Co-owner/co-chairman – Bryan Glazer; Co-owner/co-chairman – Edward Glazer; Co-owner/co-chairman – Joel Glazer; Co-owner – Avram Glazer; Co-owner – Kevin Glazer; General manager – Jason Licht; Assistant general manager – John Spytek; Director of football operations – Shelton Quarles; Assistant general manager – Mike Greenberg; Director of player personnel – Mike Biehl; Director of player personnel – Rob McCartney; Assistant director of college scouting – Byron Kiefer; Vice president of player engagement – Duke Preston; Senior advisor to the general manager – Bruce Arians; Director of pro scouting – Shane Scannell; Assistant director of pro scouting – Alex Smith; Head coaches: Head coach – Todd Bowles; Assistant head coach/run game coordinator – Harold Goodwin; Offensive coaches: Offensive coordinator – Dave Canales; Quarterbacks – Thad Lewis; Assistant quarterbacks – Jordan Somerville; Running backs – Skip Peete; Wide receivers – Brad Idzik; Tight ends – John Van Dam; Offensive line – Joe Gilbert; Senior offensive analyst – David Raih; Offensive quality control – Jeff Kastl	Defensive coaches: Run game coordinator/defensive line – Kacy Rodgers; Outside linebackers – George Edwards; Pass game coordinator/inside linebackers – Larry Foote; Cornerbacks – Kevin Ross; Safeties – Nick Rapone; Assistant secondary – Tim Atkins; Defensive assistant – Mike Chiurco; Defensive assistant – Rashad Johnson; Defensive quality control – Joey Fitzgerald; Special teams coaches: Special teams coordinator – Keith Armstrong; Defensive/special teams assistant – Keith Tandy; Strength and conditioning: Head strength and conditioning – Anthony Piroli; Assistant strength and conditioning – Cory Bichey; Assistant strength and conditioning – Chad Wade; Assistant strength and conditioning – DeAndre Ward; Director of rehabilitation and performance – Maral Javadifar

== Final roster ==
2023 Tampa Bay Buccaneers roster
Quarterbacks (QB): 6 Baker Mayfield; 2 Kyle Trask; 11 John Wolford; Running backs (RB): 22 Chase Edmonds; 44 Sean Tucker; 1 Rachaad White; Wide receivers (WR): 13 Mike Evans; 14 Chris Godwin; 18 Rakim Jarrett; 19 David Moore; 10 Trey Palmer; 83 Deven Thompkins; Tight ends (TE): 87 Payne Durham; 41 Ko Kieft; 88 Cade Otton	Offensive linemen (OL): 71 Matt Feiler G; 67 Luke Goedeke G; 70 Robert Hainsey C; 60 Nick Leverett G; 69 Cody Mauch G; 77 Justin Skule T; 64 Aaron Stinnie G; 73 Brandon Walton T; 78 Tristan Wirfs T; Defensive linemen (DL): 96 Greg Gaines NT; 92 William Gholston DE; 90 Logan Hall DE; 94 Calijah Kancey DE; 79 Pat O'Connor DE; 50 Vita Vea NT	Linebackers (LB): 7 Shaquil Barrett OLB; 52 K. J. Britt ILB; 54 Lavonte David ILB; 8 SirVocea Dennis ILB; 0 YaYa Diaby OLB; 49 Cam Gill OLB; 98 Anthony Nelson OLB; 51 J. J. Russell ILB; 9 Joe Tryon-Shoyinka OLB; 58 Markees Watts OLB; 45 Devin White ILB; Defensive backs (DB): 24 Carlton Davis CB; 35 Jamel Dean CB; 30 Dee Delaney SS; 32 Josh Hayes CB; 29 Christian Izien SS; 26 Kaevon Merriweather FS; 27 Zyon McCollum CB; 23 Ryan Neal SS; 31 Antoine Winfield Jr. FS; Special teams (ST): 5 Jake Camarda P; 4 Chase McLaughlin K; 97 Zach Triner LS	Practice squad: 95 C. J. Brewer DE; 61 Silas Dzansi T (PS/I); 72 Luke Haggard T; 16 Keenan Isaac CB; 28 Cephus Johnson WR; 25 Patrick Laird RB; 15 Richard LeCounte FS; 81 Ryan Miller WR; 34 Quandre Mosely CB; 38 Derrek Pitts CB; 33 Jose Ramirez OLB; 56 Deadrin Senat NT; 74 Logan Stenberg G; 84 Tanner Taula TE; 17 Raleigh Webb WR; 89 David Wells TE; Reserve: 3 Russell Gage WR (IR); 91 Mike Greene DE (IR); 66 Ryan Jensen C (IR); Rookies in italics

== Preseason ==
The Buccaneers' preseason opponents and schedule was announced in the spring.

Week	Date	Opponent	Result	Record	Venue	Recap
1	August 11	Pittsburgh Steelers	L 17–27	0–1	Raymond James Stadium	Recap
2	August 19	at New York Jets	W 13–6	1–1	MetLife Stadium	Recap
3	August 26	Baltimore Ravens	W 26–20	2–1	Raymond James Stadium	Recap

== Regular season ==
=== Schedule ===
Week	Date	Opponent	Result	Record	Venue	Recap
1	September 10	at Minnesota Vikings	**W** 20–17	1–0	U.S. Bank Stadium	Recap
2	September 17	Chicago Bears	**W** 27–17	2–0	Raymond James Stadium	Recap
3	September 25	Philadelphia Eagles	**L** 11–25	2–1	Raymond James Stadium	Recap
4	October 1	at **New Orleans Saints**	**W** 26–9	3–1	Caesars Superdome	Recap
5	Bye					
6	October 15	Detroit Lions	**L** 6–20	3–2	Raymond James Stadium	Recap
7	October 22	**Atlanta Falcons**	**L** 13–16	3–3	Raymond James Stadium	Recap
8	October 26	at Buffalo Bills	**L** 18–24	3–4	Highmark Stadium	Recap
9	November 5	at Houston Texans	**L** 37–39	3–5	NRG Stadium	Recap
10	November 12	Tennessee Titans	**W** 20–6	4–5	Raymond James Stadium	Recap
11	November 19	at San Francisco 49ers	**L** 14–27	4–6	Levi's Stadium	Recap
12	November 26	at Indianapolis Colts	**L** 20–27	4–7	Lucas Oil Stadium	Recap
13	December 3	**Carolina Panthers**	**W** 21–18	5–7	Raymond James Stadium	Recap
14	December 10	at **Atlanta Falcons**	**W** 29–25	6–7	Mercedes-Benz Stadium	Recap
15	December 17	at Green Bay Packers	**W** 34–20	7–7	Lambeau Field	Recap
16	December 24	Jacksonville Jaguars	**W** 30–12	8–7	Raymond James Stadium	Recap
17	December 31	**New Orleans Saints**	**L** 13–23	8–8	Raymond James Stadium	Recap
18	January 7	at **Carolina Panthers**	**W** 9–0	9–8	Bank of America Stadium	Recap

Note: Intra-division opponents are in bold text.

=== Game summaries ===
==== Week 1: at Minnesota Vikings ====
Week 1: Tampa Bay Buccaneers at Minnesota Vikings – Game summary

Quarter	1	2	3	4	Total
**Buccaneers**	3	7	7	3	**20**
Vikings	0	10	0	7	**17**

at U.S. Bank Stadium, Minneapolis, Minnesota

- Date: September 10
- Game time: 1:00 p.m. EDT/12:00 p.m. CDT
- Game weather: None (indoor stadium)
- Game attendance: 66,741
- Referee: Scott Novak
- TV announcers (CBS): Andrew Catalon, Tiki Barber, Matt Ryan and AJ Ross
- Recap, Game Book

Game information

**First quarter**

- TB – Chase McLaughlin 36-yard field goal, 3:23. Buccaneers 3–0. **Drive: 4 plays, 0 yards, 1:35.**

**Second quarter**

- MIN – Jordan Addison 39-yard pass from Kirk Cousins (Greg Joseph kick), 11:15. Vikings 7–3. **Drive: 6 plays, 83 yards, 2:53.**
- MIN – Greg Joseph 25-yard field goal, 5:41. Vikings 10–3. **Drive: 9 plays, 62 yards, 3:43.**
- TB – Mike Evans 28-yard pass from Baker Mayfield (Chase McLaughlin kick), 1:09. Tied 10–10 **Drive: 7 plays, 61 yards, 1:30.**

**Third quarter**

- TB – Trey Palmer 7-yard pass from Baker Mayfield (Chase McLaughlin kick), 6:01. Buccaneers 17–10 **Drive: 16 plays, 75 yards, 8:59.**

**Fourth quarter**

- MIN – Alexander Mattison 4-yard pass from Kirk Cousins (Greg Joseph kick), 13:37. Tied 17–17. **Drive: 16 plays, 75 yards, 7:24.**
- TB – Chase McLaughlin 57-yard field goal, 5:10. Buccaneers 20–17. **Drive: 10 plays, 38 yards, 4:46.**

**Top passers**

- TB – Baker Mayfield – 21/34, 173 yards, 2 TD
- MIN – Kirk Cousins – 33/44, 344 yards, 2 TD, INT

**Top rushers**

- TB – Rachaad White – 17 rushes, 39 yards
- MIN – Alexander Mattison – 11 rushes, 34 yards

**Top receivers**

- TB – Mike Evans – 6 receptions, 66 yards, TD
- MIN – Justin Jefferson – 9 receptions, 150 yards

Tampa Bay traveled to Minnesota in Week 1 with Baker Mayfield making his first start as quarterback. Mayfield threw for 173 yards and two touchdown passes, as the Buccaneers won on Opening Day for the third year in a row. Chase McLaughlin kicked a 57-yard go-ahead field goal with 5:10 left in regulation. Vikings quarterback Kirk Cousins threw for 344 yards and two touchdowns, but lost two fumbles, and threw an interception at the goal line. With the upset victory over the Vikings, the Buccaneers started off the season 1-0.

This was the first time the Buccaneers played the Vikings on Opening Day since 2005, and the first time they won in Minnesota since 2012.

==== Week 2: vs. Chicago Bears ====
Week 2: Chicago Bears at Tampa Bay Buccaneers – Game summary

Quarter	1	2	3	4	Total
Bears	7	3	0	7	**17**
**Buccaneers**	3	10	7	7	**27**

at Raymond James Stadium, Tampa, Florida

- Date: September 17
- Game time: 1:00 p.m. EDT
- Game weather: Cloudy, 89 °F (32 °C)
- Game attendance: 62,976
- Referee: Bill Vinovich
- TV announcers (Fox): Joe Davis, Daryl Johnston and Pam Oliver
- Recap, Game Book

Game information

**First quarter**

- TB – Chase McLaughlin 26-yard field goal, 9:03. Buccaneers 3–0. **Drive: 12 plays, 67 yards, 5:57.**
- CHI – Justin Fields 1-yard run (Cairo Santos kick), 6:17. Bears 7–3. **Drive: 6 plays, 75 yards, 2:46.**

**Second quarter**

- TB – Rachaad White 4-yard run (Chase McLaughlin kick), 10:53. Buccaneers 10–7. **Drive: 4 plays, 77 yards, 2:22.**
- CHI – Cairo Santos 52-yard field goal, 1:55. Tied 10–10. **Drive: 10 plays, 46 yards, 4:54.**
- TB – Chase McLaughlin 25-yard field goal, 0:00. Buccaneers 13–10. **Drive: 12 plays, 69 yards, 1:55.**

**Third quarter**

- TB – Mike Evans 32-yard pass from Baker Mayfield (Chase McLaughlin kick), 4:06. Buccaneers 20–10 **Drive: 12 plays, 89 yards, 7:25.**

**Fourth quarter**

- CHI – Chase Claypool 20-yard pass from Justin Fields (Cairo Santos kick), 6:17. Buccaneers 20–17. **Drive: 8 plays, 90 yards, 3:53.**
- TB – Shaquil Barrett 4-yard interception return (Chase McLaughlin kick), 2:03. Buccaneers 27–17.

**Top passers**

- CHI – Justin Fields – 16/29, 211 yards, TD, 2 INT
- TB – Baker Mayfield – 26/34, 317 yards, TD

**Top rushers**

- CHI – Khalil Herbert – 7 rushes, 35 yards
- TB – Rachaad White – 17 rushes, 73 yards, TD

**Top receivers**

- CHI – D. J. Moore – 6 receptions, 104 yards
- TB – Mike Evans – 6 receptions, 171 yards, TD

Tampa Bay won their home opener and improved to 2–0 with a 27–17 victory over the Bears. Baker Mayfield threw for 317 yards and one touchdown pass. Baker connected with Mike Evans for a 70-yard reception early in the second quarter, which led to the first Buccaneers touchdown. He later found Evans for a 32-yard touchdown pass in the third quarter. With 2:12 left in regulation, the Bears were backed up at their own 6 yard line and trailing by 3 points. Justin Fields' pass attempt was tipped and intercepted by Shaquil Barrett who muscled his way into the endzone for a touchdown. Barrett's "pick-6" sealed the win for Tampa Bay.

==== Week 3: vs. Philadelphia Eagles ====
Week 3: Philadelphia Eagles at Tampa Bay Buccaneers – Game summary

Quarter	1	2	3	4	Total
**Eagles**	3	10	9	3	**25**
Buccaneers	0	3	0	8	**11**

at Raymond James Stadium, Tampa, Florida

- Date: September 25
- Game time: 7:15 p.m. EDT
- Game weather: Cloudy, 90 °F (32 °C)
- Game attendance: 65,426
- Referee: Adrian Hill
- TV announcers (ABC): Joe Buck, Troy Aikman and Lisa Salters
- Recap, Game Book

Game information

**First quarter**

- PHI – Jake Elliott 36-yard field goal, 3:05. Eagles 3–0. **Drive: 8 plays, 26 yards, 3:20.**

**Second quarter**

- TB – Chase McLaughlin 33-yard field goal, 8:33. Tied 3–3. **Drive: 13 plays, 69 yards, 6:09.**
- PHI – Olamide Zaccheaus 34-yard pass from Jalen Hurts (Jake Elliott kick), 3:32. Eagles 10–3. **Drive: 8 plays, 84 yards, 5:01.**
- PHI – Jake Elliott 38-yard field goal, 3:05. Eagles 13–3. **Drive: 5 plays, 16 yards, 0:24.**

**Third quarter**

- PHI – Jalen Hurts 1-yard run (Jake Elliott kick), 9:12. Eagles 20–3. **Drive: 13 plays, 75 yards, 5:48.**
- PHI – Rachaad White tackled in end zone by Nicholas Morrow for a safety, 3:40. Eagles 22–3.

**Fourth quarter**

- PHI – Jake Elliott 26-yard field goal, 13:28. Eagles 25–3. **Drive: 10 plays, 55 yards, 5:12.**
- TB – Mike Evans 1-yard pass from Baker Mayfield (Baker Mayfield–Chris Godwin pass), 9:22. Eagles 25–11. **Drive: 9 plays, 75 yards, 4:06.**

**Top passers**

- PHI – Jalen Hurts – 23/37, 277 yards, TD, 2 INT
- TB – Baker Mayfield – 15/25, 146 yards, TD, INT

**Top rushers**

- PHI – D'Andre Swift – 16 rushes, 130 yards
- TB – Rachaad White – 14 rushes, 38 yards

**Top receivers**

- PHI – A. J. Brown – 9 receptions, 131 yards
- TB – Mike Evans – 5 receptions, 60 yards, TD

Tampa Bay hosted Philadelphia on Monday Night Football. Jalen Hurts threw for 277 yards and D'Andre Swift rushed for 130 yards as the Eagles defeated the Buccaneers 25–11. The Buccaneers defense gave up 201 yards on the ground. Baker Mayfield threw an interception (the team's first turnover of the season), and the offense did not reach the endzone until 9:22 remaining in the fourth quarter. Ronde Barber was honored at halftime after being inducted into the Pro Football Hall of Fame.

Tampa Bay picked up their first loss of the season, falling to 2–1.

==== Week 4: at New Orleans Saints ====
Week 4: Tampa Bay Buccaneers at New Orleans Saints – Game summary

Quarter	1	2	3	4	Total
**Buccaneers**	0	14	0	12	**26**
Saints	3	0	3	3	**9**

at Caesars Superdome, New Orleans, Louisiana

- Date: October 1
- Game time: 1:00 p.m. EDT/12:00 p.m. CDT
- Game weather: None (indoor stadium)
- Game attendance: 70,003
- Referee: Shawn Hochuli
- TV announcers (Fox): Chris Myers, Robert Smith and Jen Hale
- Recap, Game Book

Game information

**First quarter**

- NO – Blake Grupe 37-yard field goal, 9:20. Saints 3-0. **Drive: 11 plays, 56 yards, 5:40.**

**Second quarter**

- TB – Cade Otton 4-yard pass from Baker Mayfield (Chase McLaughlin kick), 5:19. Buccaneers 7-3. **Drive: 17 plays, 87 yards, 8:51.**
- TB – Trey Palmer 1-yard pass from Baker Mayfield (Chase McLaughlin kick), 0:19. Buccaneers 14-3. **Drive: 2 plays, 6 yards, 0:10.**

**Third quarter**

- NO – Blake Grupe 32-yard field goal, 0:49. Buccaneers 14-6. **Drive: 12 plays, 57 yards, 7:09.**

**Fourth quarter**

- TB – Chase McLaughlin 51-yard field goal, 13:31. Buccaneers 17-6. **Drive: 6 plays, 42 yards, 2:18.**
- NO – Blake Grupe 44-yard field goal, 8:29. Buccaneers 17-9. **Drive: 14 plays, 49 yards, 5:02.**
- TB – Deven Thompkins 5-yard pass from Baker Mayfield (pass failed), 3:44. Buccaneers 23-9. **Drive: 10 plays, 75 yards, 4:45.**
- TB – Chase McLaughlin 28-yard field goal, 2:24. Buccaneers 26-9. **Drive: 4 plays, 9 yards, 0:58.**

**Top passers**

- TB – Baker Mayfield – 25/32, 246 yards, 3 TD, INT
- NO – Derek Carr – 23/37, 127 yards

**Top rushers**

- TB – Rachaad White – 15 rushes, 56 yards
- NO – Alvin Kamara – 11 rushes, 51 yards

**Top receivers**

- TB – Chris Godwin – 8 receptions, 114 yards
- NO – Michael Thomas – 4 receptions, 53 yards

Tampa Bay defeated division rival New Orleans by the score of 26–9 and took over sole possession of first place in the NFC South. Quarterback Baker Mayfield threw three touchdown passes and Chris Godwin had eight catches for 114 yards. Derek Carr started at quarterback for New Orleans, and Alvin Kamara returned from a three-game suspension, but the Saints offense struggled, and failed to reach the endzone. Mike Evans caught three balls for 40 yards, but left the game around halftime with a hamstring injury.

==== Week 6: vs. Detroit Lions ====
Week 6: Detroit Lions at Tampa Bay Buccaneers – Game summary

Quarter	1	2	3	4	Total
**Lions**	3	7	7	3	**20**
Buccaneers	0	3	3	0	**6**

at Raymond James Stadium, Tampa, Florida

- Date: October 15
- Game time: 4:25 p.m. EDT
- Game weather: Cloudy, 77 °F (25 °C)
- Game attendance: 65,854
- Referee: Clay Martin
- TV announcers (Fox): Adam Amin, Daryl Johnston and Pam Oliver
- Recap, Game Book

Game information

**First quarter**

- DET – Riley Patterson 30-yard field goal, 8:09. Lions 3-0. **Drive: 4 plays, 0 yards, 1:59.**

**Second quarter**

- TB – Chase McLaughlin 33-yard field goal, 7:34. Tied 3-3. **Drive: 9 plays, 43 yards, 4:24.**
- DET – Amon-Ra St. Brown 27-yard pass from Jared Goff (Riley Patterson kick), 0:19. Lions 10-3. **Drive: 8 plays, 75 yards, 4:55.**

**Third quarter**

- TB – Chase McLaughlin 36-yard field goal, 7:44. Lions 10-6. **Drive: 6 plays, 40 yards, 2:49.**
- DET – Jameson Williams 45-yard pass from Jared Goff (Riley Patterson kick), 3:19. Lions 17-6. **Drive: 9 plays, 73 yards, 4:25.**

**Fourth quarter**

- DET – Riley Patterson 36-yard field goal, 12:00. Lions 20-6. **Drive: 9 plays, 53 yards, 4:05.**

**Top passers**

- DET – Jared Goff – 30/44, 353 yards, 2 TD
- TB – Baker Mayfield – 19/37, 206 yards, INT

**Top rushers**

- DET – Craig Reynolds – 10 rushes, 15 yards
- TB – Rachaad White – 7 rushes, 26 yards

**Top receivers**

- DET – Amon-Ra St. Brown – 12 receptions, 124 yards, TD
- TB – Chris Godwin – 6 receptions, 77 yards

Tampa Bay wore their orange throwback ("Creamsicle") uniforms and "Bucco Bruce" helmets against Detroit. The Buccaneers were unable to get much of anything going on offense. They were held out of the endzone, and managed only two field goals. Jared Goff put up 353 yards passing, and threw two touchdown passes as the Lions won 20–6. In the first quarter, at their own 8-yard line, Baker Mayfield had Mike Evans wide open down field for what could have been a 92-yard touchdown pass. Instead, the pass was tipped at the line of scrimmage by Isaiah Buggs and intercepted by Charles Harris. The Lions scored a field goal off of the turnover, and would never trail the rest of the game.

==== Week 7: vs. Atlanta Falcons ====
Week 7: Atlanta Falcons at Tampa Bay Buccaneers – Game summary

Quarter	1	2	3	4	Total
**Falcons**	7	3	3	3	**16**
Buccaneers	7	3	0	3	**13**

at Raymond James Stadium, Tampa, Florida

- Date: October 22
- Game time: 1:00 p.m. EDT
- Game weather: Cloudy, 79 °F (26 °C)
- Game attendance: 62,620
- Referee: Ronald Torbert
- TV announcers (Fox): Chris Myers, Mark Schlereth and Kristina Pink
- Recap, Game Book

Game information

**First quarter**

- ATL — Desmond Ridder 2-yard run (Younghoe Koo kick), 6:48. Falcons 7–0. **Drive: 8 plays, 58 yards, 3:51.**
- TB – Mike Evans 40-yard pass from Baker Mayfield (Chase McLaughlin kick), 3:24. Tied 7–7. **Drive: 7 plays, 67 yards, 3:24.**

**Second quarter**

- ATL – Younghoe Koo 24-yard field goal, 11:51. Falcons 10–7. **Drive: 8 plays, 62 yards, 3:00.**
- TB – Chase McLaughlin 24-yard field goal, 5:14. Tied 10–10. **Drive: 15 plays, 76 yards, 6:37.**

**Third quarter**

- ATL – Younghoe Koo 41-yard field goal, 2:04. Falcons 13–10. **Drive: 8 plays, 40 yards, 3:55.**

**Fourth quarter**

- TB – Chase McLaughlin 36-yard field goal, 0:45. Tied 13–13. **Drive: 10 plays, 49 yards, 1:51.**
- ATL – Younghoe Koo 51-yard field goal, 0:00. Falcons 16–13. **Drive: 5 plays, 42 yards, 0:45.**

**Top passers**

- ATL – Desmond Ridder – 19/25, 250 yards
- TB – Baker Mayfield – 27/42, 275 yards, TD, INT

**Top rushers**

- ATL – Tyler Allgeier – 21 rushes, 59 yards
- TB – Rachaad White – 13 rushes, 34 yards

**Top receivers**

- ATL – Drake London – 6 receptions, 54 yards
- TB – Mike Evans – 6 receptions, 82 yards, TD

The Tampa Bay defense forced three turnovers in the red zone. In the final two minutes, the Buccaneers drove to the Falcons 8 yard line. Chase McLaughlin kicked a 36-yard field goal to tie the score at 13–13 with 45 seconds left. However, Younghoe Koo kicked a 51-yard field goal as time expired, and Atlanta won 16–13. YouTuber MrBeast (Jimmy Donaldson) signed a 48-hour contract with the Buccaneers and appeared at the game.

==== Week 8: at Buffalo Bills ====
Week 8: Tampa Bay Buccaneers at Buffalo Bills – Game summary

Quarter	1	2	3	4	Total
Buccaneers	0	10	0	8	**18**
**Bills**	3	14	7	0	**24**

at Highmark Stadium, Orchard Park, New York

- Date: October 26
- Game time: 8:15 p.m. EDT
- Game weather: Partly cloudy, 66 °F (19 °C)
- Game attendance: 70,416
- Referee: Scott Novak
- TV announcers (WTVT/Prime Video): Al Michaels, Kirk Herbstreit and Kaylee Hartung
- Recap, Game Book

Game information

**First quarter**

- BUF – Tyler Bass 37-yard field goal, 8:04. Bills 3–0. **Drive: 10 plays, 77 yards, 4:31.**

**Second quarter**

- BUF – Josh Allen 13-yard run (Tyler Bass kick), 11:03. Bills 10–0. **Drive: 5 plays, 23 yards, 2:45.**
- TB – Chase McLaughlin 57-yard field goal, 7:40. Bills 10–3. **Drive: 8 plays, 36 yards, 3:23.**
- TB – Chris Godwin 3-yard pass from Baker Mayfield (Chase McLaughlin kick), 6:46. Tied 10–10. **Drive: 2 plays, 23 yards, 0:47.**
- BUF – Dalton Kincaid 22-yard pass from Josh Allen (Tyler Bass kick), 2:40. Bills 17–10. **Drive: 9 plays, 75 yards, 4:06.**

**Third quarter**

- BUF – Gabe Davis 4-yard pass from Josh Allen (Tyler Bass kick), 10:40. Bills 24–10. **Drive: 9 plays, 75 yards, 4:20.**

**Fourth quarter**

- TB – Mike Evans 24-yard pass from Baker Mayfield (Baker Mayfield–Cade Otton pass), 2:44. Bills 24–18. **Drive: 17 plays, 92 yards, 7:21.**

**Top passers**

- TB – Baker Mayfield – 25/42, 237 yards, 2 TD
- BUF – Josh Allen – 31/40, 324 yards, 2 TD, INT

**Top rushers**

- TB – Rachaad White – 9 rushes, 39 yards
- BUF – James Cook – 14 rushes, 67 yards

**Top receivers**

- TB – Rachaad White – 7 receptions, 70 yards
- BUF – Khalil Shakir – 6 receptions, 92 yards

Tampa Bay traveled to Buffalo on Thursday Night Football. Trailing 24–10 in the fourth quarter, Baker Mayfield drove the Buccaneers 92 yards in 17 plays. The drive ate up over 7 minutes, but was capped off by a 24-yard touchdown pass to Mike Evans with 2:51 to go. With the score 24–18, Tampa Bay forced a punt, and got the ball back with just under 30 seconds left. Mayfield's hail mary pass to the endzone fell incomplete as time expired, and the Bills held on to win.

==== Week 9: at Houston Texans ====
Week 9: Tampa Bay Buccaneers at Houston Texans – Game summary

Quarter	1	2	3	4	Total
Buccaneers	10	7	6	14	**37**
**Texans**	7	3	12	17	**39**

at NRG Stadium, Houston, Texas

- Date: November 5
- Game time: 1:00 p.m. EST/12:00 p.m. CST
- Game weather: None (retractable roof closed)
- Game attendance: 70,785
- Referee: Land Clark
- TV announcers (CBS): Ian Eagle, Charles Davis and Evan Washburn
- Recap, Game Book

Game information

**First quarter**

- TB – Chase McLaughlin 35-yard field goal, 12:56. Buccaneers 3–0. **Drive: 5 plays, 25 yards, 1:42.**
- HOU – Nico Collins 14-yard pass from C. J. Stroud (Kaʻimi Fairbairn kick), 9:10. Texans 7–3. **Drive: 7 plays, 75 yards, 3:46.**
- TB – Cade Otton 3-yard pass from Baker Mayfield (Chase McLaughlin kick), 2:13. Buccaneers 10–7. **Drive: 13 plays, 75 yards, 6:57.**

**Second quarter**

- TB – Rachaad White 1-yard run (Chase McLaughlin kick), 9:05. Buccaneers 17–7. **Drive: 6 plays, 40 yards, 2:58.**
- HOU – Kaʻimi Fairbairn 50-yard field goal, 5:17. Buccaneers 17–10. **Drive: 10 plays, 43 yards, 3:48.**

**Third quarter**

- TB – Chase McLaughlin 49-yard field goal, 12:38. Buccaneers 20–10. **Drive: 7 plays, 42 yards, 2:22.**
- HOU – Noah Brown 75-yard pass from C. J. Stroud (pass failed), 12:20. Buccaneers 20–16. **Drive: 1 play, 75 yards, 0:18.**
- TB – Chase McLaughlin 55-yard field goal, 9:23. Buccaneers 23–16. **Drive: 6 plays, 38 yards, 2:57.**
- HOU – Tank Dell 29-yard pass from C. J. Stroud (pass failed), 5:59. Buccaneers 23–22. **Drive: 6 plays, 79 yards, 3:24.**

**Fourth quarter**

- HOU – Dalton Schultz 9-yard pass from C. J. Stroud (C. J. Stroud run), 14:11. Texans 30–23. **Drive: 9 plays, 52 yards, 4:26.**
- TB – Rachaad White 1-yard run (Chase McLaughlin kick), 11:43. Tied 30–30. **Drive: 6 plays, 75 yards, 2:28.**
- HOU – Dare Ogunbowale 29-yard field goal, 8:45. Texans 33–30. **Drive: 7 plays, 64 yards, 2:58.**
- TB – Cade Otton 14-yard pass from Baker Mayfield (Chase McLaughlin kick), 0:46. Buccaneers 37–33. **Drive: 10 plays, 61 yards, 3:41.**
- HOU – Tank Dell 15-yard pass from C. J. Stroud (run failed), 0:06. Texans 39–37. **Drive: 6 plays, 75 yards, 0:40.**

**Top passers**

- TB – Baker Mayfield – 20/29, 250 yards, 2 TD
- HOU – C. J. Stroud – 30/42, 470 yards, 5 TD

**Top rushers**

- TB – Rachaad White – 20 rushes, 73 yards, 2 TD
- HOU – Devin Singletary – 13 rushes, 26 yards

**Top receivers**

- TB – Mike Evans – 4 receptions, 87 yards
- HOU – Noah Brown – 6 receptions, 157 yards, TD

Quarterback Baker Mayfield threw a 14-yard touchdown pass to Cade Otton to take a 37–33 lead with 46 seconds left in regulation. But C. J. Stroud threw the game winning touchdown pass to Tank Dell with 6 seconds left to lift the Texans over the Buccaneers. Stroud threw five touchdown passes and threw for an NFL rookie record 470 yards passing.

==== Week 10: vs. Tennessee Titans ====
Week 10: Tennessee Titans at Tampa Bay Buccaneers – Game summary

Quarter	1	2	3	4	Total
Titans	3	0	0	3	**6**
**Buccaneers**	0	7	10	3	**20**

at Raymond James Stadium, Tampa, Florida

- Date: November 12
- Game time: 1:00 p.m. EST
- Game weather: Cloudy, 85 °F (29 °C)
- Game attendance: 62,725
- Referee: Alan Eck
- TV announcers (CBS): Andrew Catalon, Tiki Barber, Matt Ryan and AJ Ross
- Recap, Game Book

Game information

**First quarter**

- TEN – Nick Folk 38-yard field goal, 8:34. Titans 3–0. **Drive: 12 plays, 55 yards, 6:26.**

**Second quarter**

- TB – Rachaad White 43-yard pass from Baker Mayfield (Chase McLaughlin kick), 5:39. Buccaneers 7–3. **Drive: 6 plays, 85 yards, 3:09.**

**Third quarter**

- TB – Chase McLaughlin 25-yard field goal, 10:42. Buccaneers 10–3. **Drive: 11 plays, 68 yards, 4:18.**
- TB – Mike Evans 22-yard pass from Baker Mayfield (Chase McLaughlin kick), 2:46. Buccaneers 17–3. **Drive: 8 plays, 80 yards, 4:45.**

**Fourth quarter**

- TEN – Nick Folk 27-yard field goal, 12:54. Buccaneers 17–6. **Drive: 11 plays, 66 yards, 4:52.**
- TB – Chase McLaughlin 35-yard field goal, 7:01. Buccaneers 20–6. **Drive: 11 plays, 58 yards, 5:53.**

**Top passers**

- TEN – Will Levis – 19/39, 199 yards, INT
- TB – Baker Mayfield – 18/29, 278 yards, 2 TD, INT

**Top rushers**

- TEN – Derrick Henry – 11 rushes, 24 yards
- TB – Rachaad White – 20 rushes, 51 yards

**Top receivers**

- TEN – Tyjae Spears – 4 receptions, 42 yards
- TB – Mike Evans – 6 receptions, 143 yards, TD

Tampa Bay snapped a four-game losing streak, defeating the Titans 20–6. Baker Mayfield threw for 278 yards and two touchdown passes. The Buccaneers defense sacked Will Levis four times, had an interception, and kept Tennessee out of the endzone. Tampa Bay took a 7–3 lead in the second quarter with a screen pass to Rachaad White, who then broke free for a 43-yard touchdown. Mike Evans dropped a sure touchdown catch in third quarter, but made up for it with a 22-yard touchdown pass on the next drive. Evans caught the ball at the 5 yard line, then dragged defenders into the endzone for the score. Evans moved into a tie for 16th on the NFL's all-time list for receiving touchdowns.

==== Week 11: at San Francisco 49ers ====
Week 11: Tampa Bay Buccaneers at San Francisco 49ers – Game summary

Quarter	1	2	3	4	Total
Buccaneers	0	7	0	7	**14**
**49ers**	7	6	14	0	**27**

at Levi's Stadium, Santa Clara, California

- Date: November 19
- Game time: 4:05 p.m. EST/1:05 p.m. PST
- Game weather: Sunny, 65 °F (18 °C)
- Game attendance: 71,607
- Referee: Craig Wrolstad
- TV announcers (Fox): Joe Davis, Daryl Johnston and Pam Oliver
- Recap, Game Book

Game information

**First quarter**

- SF – Christian McCaffrey 4-yard pass from Brock Purdy (Jake Moody kick), 3:55. 49ers 7–0. **Drive: 12 plays, 80 yards, 7:11.**

**Second quarter**

- SF – Jake Moody 37-yard field goal, 7:21. 49ers 10–0. **Drive: 9 plays, 46 yards, 5:36.**
- TB – Mike Evans 1-yard pass from Baker Mayfield (Chase McLaughlin kick), 1:48. 49ers 10–7. **Drive: 10 plays, 75 yards, 5:33.**
- SF – Jake Moody 28-yard field goal, 0:16. 49ers 13–7. **Drive: 8 plays, 61 yards, 1:32.**

**Third quarter**

- SF – Brandon Aiyuk 76-yard pass from Brock Purdy (Jake Moody kick), 10:54. 49ers 20–7. **Drive: 3 plays, 98 yards, 1:34.**
- SF – George Kittle 3-yard pass from Brock Purdy (Jake Moody kick), 1:42. 49ers 27–7. **Drive: 9 plays, 79 yards, 5:18.**

**Fourth quarter**

- TB – Rachaad White 1-yard run (Chase McLaughlin kick), 14:16. 49ers 27–14. **Drive: 5 plays, 75 yards, 2:26.**

**Top passers**

- TB – Baker Mayfield – 29/45, 246 yards, TD, INT
- SF – Brock Purdy – 21/25, 333 yards, 3 TD

**Top rushers**

- TB – Rachaad White – 9 rushes, 30 yards, TD
- SF – Christian McCaffrey – 21 rushes, 78 yards

**Top receivers**

- TB – Cade Otton – 4 receptions, 49 yards
- SF – George Kittle – 8 receptions, 89 yards, TD

Brock Purdy threw three touchdown passes as the 49ers beat Tampa Bay 27–14. A fourth quarter rally attempt fell short as the Buccaneers twice were in the red zone, but could not score on either drive.

==== Week 12: at Indianapolis Colts ====
Week 12: Tampa Bay Buccaneers at Indianapolis Colts – Game summary

Quarter	1	2	3	4	Total
Buccaneers	3	7	0	10	**20**
**Colts**	10	7	3	7	**27**

at Lucas Oil Stadium, Indianapolis, Indiana

- Date: November 26
- Game time: 1:00 p.m. EST
- Game weather: None (retractable roof closed)
- Game attendance: 64,407
- Referee: Clete Blakeman
- TV announcers (CBS): Spero Dedes, Adam Archuleta and Amanda Renner
- Recap, Game Book

Game information

**First quarter**

- TB – Chase McLaughlin 21-yard field goal, 7:28. Buccaners 3–0. **Drive: 15 plays, 72 yards, 7:32.**
- IND – Matt Gay 46-yard field goal, 3:01. Tied 3–3. **Drive: 10 plays, 46 yards, 4:27.**
- IND – Jonathan Taylor 1-yard run (Matt Gay kick), 0:11. Colts 10–3. **Drive: 4 plays, 41 yards, 1:38.**

**Second quarter**

- IND – Gardner Minshew 2-yard run (Matt Gay kick), 9:36. Colts 17–3. **Drive: 10 plays, 62 yards, 4:15.**
- TB – Mike Evans 1-yard pass from Baker Mayfield (Chase McLaughlin kick), 5:08. Colts 17–10. **Drive: 3 plays, 16 yards, 1:25.**

**Third quarter**

- IND – Matt Gay 36-yard field goal, 10:01. Colts 20–10. **Drive: 11 plays, 57 yards, 4:59.**

**Fourth quarter**

- TB – Mike Evans 23-yard pass from Baker Mayfield (Chase McLaughlin kick), 12:50. Colts 20–17. **Drive: 9 plays, 60 yards, 3:56.**
- IND – Jonathan Taylor 1-yard run (Matt Gay kick), 7:30. Colts 27–17. **Drive: 9 plays, 75 yards, 5:20.**
- TB – Chase McLaughlin 24-yard field goal, 4:10. Colts 27–20. **Drive: 9 plays, 69 yards, 3:20.**

**Top passers**

- TB – Baker Mayfield – 20/30, 199 yards, 2 TD, INT
- IND – Gardner Minshew – 24/41, 251 yards, INT

**Top rushers**

- TB – Rachaad White – 15 rushes, 100 yards
- IND – Jonathan Taylor – 15 rushes, 91 yards, 2 TD

**Top receivers**

- TB – Mike Evans – 6 receptions, 70 yards, 2 TD
- IND – Michael Pittman Jr. – 10 receptions, 107 yards

Trailing 27–20 with under two minutes to go, Baker Mayfield was sacked at the Tampa Bay 35 and fumbled. The Colts recovered, and ran out the clock to seal the victory.

==== Week 13: vs. Carolina Panthers ====
Week 13: Carolina Panthers at Tampa Bay Buccaneers – Game summary

Quarter	1	2	3	4	Total
Panthers	0	3	7	8	**18**
**Buccaneers**	7	0	7	7	**21**

at Raymond James Stadium, Tampa, Florida

- Date: December 3
- Game time: 4:05 p.m. EST
- Game weather: Cloudy, 81 °F (27 °C)
- Game attendance: 62,432
- Referee: Brad Rogers
- TV announcers (CBS): Tom McCarthy, James Lofton, Jay Feely and Tiffany Blackmon
- Recap, Game Book

Game information

**First quarter**

- TB – Rachaad White 1-yard run (Chase McLaughlin kick), 6:08. Buccaneers 7–0. **Drive: 8 plays, 57 yards, 3:26.**

**Second quarter**

- CAR – Eddy Pineiro 23-yard field goal, 13:30. Buccaneers 7–3. **Drive: 14 plays, 70 yards, 7:38.**

**Third quarter**

- CAR – Chuba Hubbard 1-yard run (Eddy Pineiro kick), 5:04. Panthers 10–7. **Drive: 7 plays, 65 yards, 3:36.**
- TB – Mike Evans 75-yard pass from Baker Mayfield (Chase McLaughlin kick), 4:54. Buccaneers 14–10. **Drive: 1 play, 75 yards, 0:10.**

**Fourth quarter**

- TB – Chris Godwin 19-yard run (Chase McLaughlin kick), 11:36. Buccaneers 21–10. **Drive: 7 plays, 67 yards, 4:05.**
- CAR – Chuba Hubbard 1-yard run (Bryce Young run), 5:02. Buccaneers 21–18. **Drive: 11 plays, 75 yards, 6:34.**

**Top passers**

- CAR – Bryce Young – 15/31, 178 yards, INT
- TB – Baker Mayfield – 14/29, 202 yards, TD, INT

**Top rushers**

- CAR – Chuba Hubbard – 25 rushes, 104 yards, 2 TD
- TB – Rachaad White – 20 rushes, 84 yards, TD

**Top receivers**

- CAR – Jonathan Mingo – 6 receptions, 69 yards
- TB – Mike Evans – 7 receptions, 162 yards, TD

Heavy rain during the first half saw both teams struggle offensively early on. Trailing 10–7, Baker Mayfield found Mike Evans between two defenders, and Evans took off for a 75-yard touchdown pass. Evans joined Jerry Rice as the second player to have ten consecutive 1,000-yard receiving seasons. Chris Godwin then added a 19-yard touchdown run in the fourth quarter. With just over two minutes left, and trailing by 3, Carolina faced a 4th & 1 at their own 40 yard line. Bryce Young's pass was intercepted by Antoine Winfield Jr. Tampa Bay would run out the clock and secured the victory.

==== Week 14: at Atlanta Falcons ====
Week 14: Tampa Bay Buccaneers at Atlanta Falcons – Game summary

Quarter	1	2	3	4	Total
**Buccaneers**	3	9	7	10	**29**
Falcons	3	7	0	15	**25**

at Mercedes-Benz Stadium, Atlanta, Georgia

- Date: December 10
- Game time: 1:00 p.m. EST
- Game weather: None (retractable roof closed)
- Game attendance: 69,496
- Referee: Alex Kemp
- TV announcers (CBS): Spero Dedes, Adam Archuleta and Aditi Kinkhabwala
- Recap, Game Book

Game information

**First quarter**

- TB – Chase McLaughlin 55-yard field goal, 9:27. Buccaneers 3–0. **Drive: 9 plays, 38 yards, 5:33.**
- ATL – Younghoe Koo 20-yard field goal, 1:23. Tied 3–3. **Drive: 16 plays, 73 yards, 8:04.**

**Second quarter**

- TB – Baker Mayfield 1-yard run (Chase McLaughlin kick), 14:57. Buccaneers 10–3. **Drive: 2 plays, 8 yards, 0:23.**
- ATL – Kyle Pitts 36-yard pass from Desmond Ridder (Younghoe Koo kick), 12:09. Tied 10–10. **Drive: 6 plays, 75 yards, 2:48.**
- TB – Keith Smith tackled in end zone for a safety, 2:36. Buccaneers 12–10.

**Third quarter**

- TB – Rachaad White 31-yard pass from Baker Mayfield (Chase McLaughlin kick), 4:06. Buccaneers 19–10. **Drive: 9 plays, 66 yards, 4:40.**

**Fourth quarter**

- ATL – Bijan Robinson 3-yard run (Younghoe Koo kick), 11:10. Buccaneers 19–17. **Drive: 7 plays, 67 yards, 2:52.**
- TB – Chase McLaughlin 38-yard field goal, 6:10. Buccaneers 22–17. **Drive: 10 plays, 55 yards, 5:00.**
- ATL – Desmond Ridder 6-yard run (Desmond Ridder-Drake London pass), 3:23. Falcons 25–22. **Drive: 5 plays, 75 yards, 2:47.**
- TB – Cade Otton 11-yard pass from Baker Mayfield (Chase McLaughlin kick), 0:31. Buccaneers 29–25. **Drive: 12 plays, 75 yards, 2:52.**

**Top passers**

- TB – Baker Mayfield – 14/29, 144 yards, 2 TD
- ATL – Desmond Ridder – 26/40, 347 yards, TD, INT

**Top rushers**

- TB – Rachaad White – 25 rushes, 102 yards
- ATL – Tyler Allgeier – 9 rushes, 40 yards

**Top receivers**

- TB – Chris Godwin – 5 receptions, 53 yards
- ATL – Drake London – 10 receptions, 172 yards

Trailing 25–22 with 3:23 left in regulation, Baker Mayfield drove the Buccaneers 75 yards in 12 plays for the game-winning score. Mayfield lofted an 11-yard touchdown pass to Cade Otton with 31 seconds left to lift Tampa Bay over Atlanta. With receivers Mike Evans and Chris Godwin blanketed by defenders all afternoon, Tampa Bay managed only 144 yards passing, and Mayfield had to count on Otton for the game-winner. The Tampa Bay defense came up strong, particularly in the first half. Carlton Davis intercepted Desmond Ridder, setting up a Buccaneers touchdown. Then Antoine Winfield Jr. forced a Ridder fumble in the endzone which resulted in a safety. With 4 seconds left, Ridder completed a pass deep to Drake London, but was tackled immediately at the 4 yard line, and time expired. Tampa Bay secured the win, and moved back into first place in the NFC South.

==== Week 15: at Green Bay Packers ====
Week 15: Tampa Bay Buccaneers at Green Bay Packers – Game summary

Quarter	1	2	3	4	Total
**Buccaneers**	3	10	14	7	**34**
Packers	7	3	7	3	**20**

at Lambeau Field, Green Bay, Wisconsin

- Date: December 17
- Game time: 1:00 p.m. EST/12:00 p.m. CST
- Game weather: Cloudy, 42 °F (6 °C)
- Game attendance: 77,275
- Referee: Tra Blake
- TV announcers (CBS): Andrew Catalon, Tiki Barber, Matt Ryan and AJ Ross
- Recap, Game Book

Game information

**First quarter**

- TB – Chase McLaughlin 39-yard field goal, 9:02. Buccaneers 3–0. **Drive: 10 plays, 54 yards, 5:58.**
- GB – Tucker Kraft 5-yard pass from Jordan Love (Anders Carlson kick), 0:49. Packers 7–3. **Drive: 2 plays, 4 yards, 0:52.**

**Second quarter**

- TB – Mike Evans 19-yard pass from Baker Mayfield (Chase McLaughlin kick), 12:21. Buccaneers 10–7. **Drive: 7 plays, 75 yards, 3:28.**
- GB – Anders Carlson 36-yard field goal, 7:09. Tied 10–10. **Drive: 8 plays, 57 yards, 5:12.**
- TB – Chase McLaughlin 46-yard field goal, 0:10. Buccaneers 13–10. **Drive: 9 plays, 61 yards, 2:03.**

**Third quarter**

- TB – Rachaad White 26-yard pass from Baker Mayfield (Chase McLaughlin kick), 10:55. Buccaneers 20–10. **Drive: 8 plays, 66 yards, 3:26.**
- GB – Jayden Reed 17-yard pass from Jordan Love (Anders Carlson kick), 4:18. Buccaneers 20–17. **Drive: 11 plays, 75 yards, 6:37.**
- TB – Ko Kieft 2-yard pass from Baker Mayfield (Chase McLaughlin kick), 0:20. Buccaneers 27–17. **Drive: 9 plays, 75 yards, 3:58.**

**Fourth quarter**

- GB – Anders Carlson 33-yard field goal, 10:04. Buccaneers 27–20. **Drive: 10 plays, 60 yards, 5:16.**
- TB – David Moore 52-yard pass from Baker Mayfield (Chase McLaughlin kick), 6:30. Buccaneers 34–20. **Drive: 6 plays, 75 yards, 3:34.**

**Top passers**

- TB – Baker Mayfield – 22/28, 381 yards, 4 TD
- GB – Jordan Love – 29/39, 284 yards, 2 TD

**Top rushers**

- TB – Rachaad White – 21 rushes, 89 yards
- GB – Aaron Jones – 20 rushes, 86 yards

**Top receivers**

- TB – Chris Godwin – 10 receptions, 155 yards
- GB – Dontayvion Wicks – 6 receptions, 97 yards

Baker Mayfield threw for 381 yards and four touchdown passes as Tampa Bay defeated Green Bay 34–20. Chris Godwin had 10 receptions for 155 yards, while Mayfield threw touchdowns to four different receivers. Tampa Bay won their first regular season game at Lambeau Field since Week 3 of 2005. Mayfield also became the first visiting quarterback ever to register a perfect 158.3 passer rating against the Packers at Lambeau Field. The Tampa Bay offense racked up 452 total yards, and David Moore iced the game with a 52-yard catch and run touchdown with 6:30 left in the fourth quarter.

==== Week 16: vs. Jacksonville Jaguars ====
Week 16: Jacksonville Jaguars at Tampa Bay Buccaneers – Game summary

Quarter	1	2	3	4	Total
Jaguars	0	0	6	6	**12**
**Buccaneers**	3	17	10	0	**30**

at Raymond James Stadium, Tampa, Florida

- Date: December 24
- Game time: 4:05 p.m. EST
- Game weather: Cloudy, 72 °F (22 °C)
- Game attendance: 62,547
- Referee: Brad Allen
- TV announcers (CBS): Kevin Harlan, Trent Green and Melanie Collins
- Recap, Game Book

Game information

**First quarter**

- TB – Chase McLaughlin 24-yard field goal, 7:22. Buccaneers 3–0. **Drive: 14 plays, 69 yards, 7:38.**

**Second quarter**

- TB – Mike Evans 3-yard pass from Baker Mayfield (Chase McLaughlin kick), 12:53. Buccaneers 10–0. **Drive: 11 plays, 56 yards, 6:07.**
- TB – Chase McLaughlin 31-yard field goal, 2:27. Buccaneers 13–0. **Drive: 9 plays, 45 yards, 3:53.**
- TB – Mike Evans 22-yard pass from Baker Mayfield (Chase McLaughlin kick), 0:45. Buccaneers 20–0. **Drive: 7 plays, 65 yards, 0:49.**

**Third quarter**

- TB – Rachaad White 2-yard run (Chase McLaughlin kick), 11:30. Buccaneers 27–0. **Drive: 5 plays, 37 yards, 2:03.**
- TB – Chase McLaughlin 51-yard field goal, 3:49. Buccaneers 30–0. **Drive: 10 plays, 27 yards, 5:32.**
- JAX – Calvin Ridley 18-yard pass from Trevor Lawrence (pass failed), 0:50. Buccaneers 30–6. **Drive: 10 plays, 75 yards, 2:59.**

**Fourth quarter**

- JAX – Calvin Ridley 1-yard pass from C. J. Beathard (pass failed), 4:36. Buccaneers 30–12. **Drive: 5 plays, 51 yards, 1:09.**

**Top passers**

- JAX – Trevor Lawrence – 17/29, 211 yards, TD, 2 INT
- TB – Baker Mayfield – 26/35, 283 yards, 2 TD

**Top rushers**

- JAX – Trevor Lawrence – 4 rushes, 29 yards
- TB – Rachaad White – 20 rushes, 39 yards, TD

**Top receivers**

- JAX – Evan Engram – 10 receptions, 95 yards
- TB – Mike Evans – 7 receptions, 86 yards, 2 TD

Tampa Bay hosted Jacksonville on Christmas Eve. Tampa Bay built a dominating 30–0 lead, and cruised to a 30–12 victory. Baker Mayfield threw for 283 yards and Mike Evans caught two touchdown passes. The Tampa Bay defense sacked Trevor Lawrence three times, and Lawrence threw two interceptions, and lost one fumble. The Buccaneers won their fourth straight game, and moved into sole possession of first place in the NFC South.

==== Week 17: vs. New Orleans Saints ====
Week 17: New Orleans Saints at Tampa Bay Buccaneers – Game summary

Quarter	1	2	3	4	Total
**Saints**	7	10	3	3	**23**
Buccaneers	0	0	0	13	**13**

at Raymond James Stadium, Tampa, Florida

- Date: December 31
- Game time: 1:00 p.m. EST
- Game weather: Clear, 66 °F (19 °C)
- Game attendance: 65,471
- Referee: Land Clark
- TV announcers (Fox): Kevin Burkhardt, Greg Olsen, Erin Andrews and Tom Rinaldi
- Recap, Game Book

Game information

**First quarter**

- NO – Juwan Johnson 4-yard pass from Derek Carr (Blake Grupe kick), 7:04. Saints 7–0. **Drive: 14 plays, 73 yards, 7:56.**

**Second quarter**

- NO – Taysom Hill 22-yard pass from Derek Carr (Blake Grupe kick), 1:53. Saints 14–0. **Drive: 8 plays, 60 yards, 3:47.**
- NO – Blake Grupe 45-yard field goal, 0:09. Saints 17–0. **Drive: 7 plays, 19 yards, 1:25.**

**Third quarter**

- NO – Blake Grupe 28-yard field goal, 4:25. Saints 20–0. **Drive: 7 plays, 45 yards, 3:05.**

**Fourth quarter**

- TB – Trey Palmer 22-yard pass from Baker Mayfield (Chase McLaughlin kick), 7:50. Saints 20–7. **Drive: 8 plays, 91 yards, 2:40.**
- NO – Blake Grupe 38-yard field goal, 3:48. Saints 23–7. **Drive: 9 plays, 43 yards, 4:02.**
- TB – Chris Godwin 47-yard pass from Baker Mayfield (pass failed), 1:37. Saints 23–13. **Drive: 2 plays, 54 yards, 0:15.**

**Top passers**

- NO – Derek Carr – 24/32, 197 yards, 2 TD
- TB – Baker Mayfield – 22/33, 309 yards, 2 TD, 2 INT

**Top rushers**

- NO – Jamaal Williams – 19 rushes, 58 yards
- TB – Rachaad White – 11 rushes, 42 yards

**Top receivers**

- NO – Juwan Johnson – 8 receptions, 90 yards, TD
- TB – Chase Edmonds – 5 receptions, 40 yards

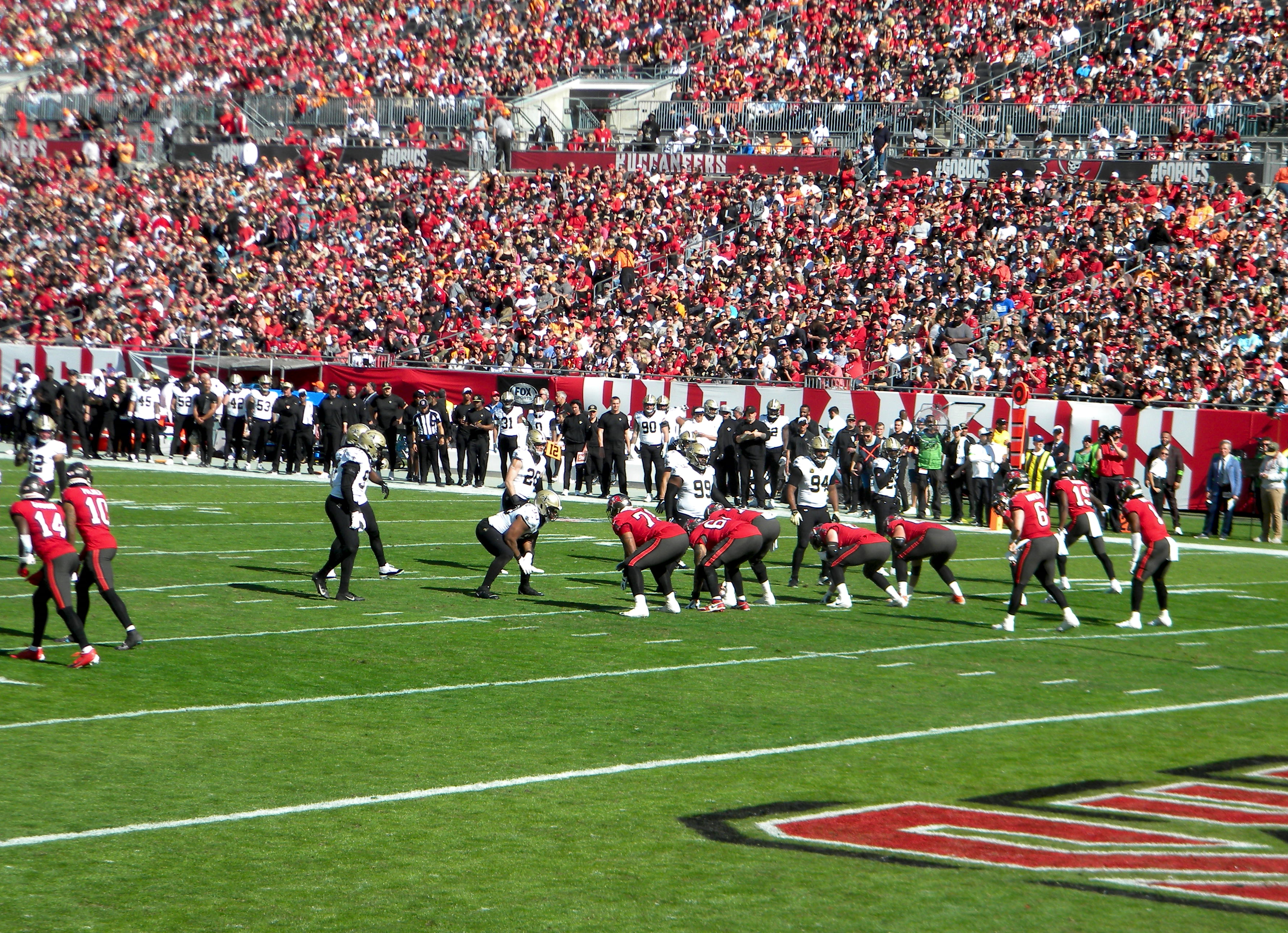
Buccaneers vs. Saints game action

Tampa Bay hosted rival New Orleans on New Year's Eve in their final regular season home game. With a victory, the Buccaneers would clinch the NFC South division. With a loss, the Saints and Falcons remained in the hunt for the playoffs. The Buccaneers sputtered much of the day, turning the ball over four times. The Saints led by as much as 20–0 at the end of the third quarter. Baker Mayfield threw touchdown passes to Trey Palmer and Chris Godwin in the fourth quarter, but the rally fell short.

==== Week 18: at Carolina Panthers ====
Week 18: Tampa Bay Buccaneers at Carolina Panthers – Game summary

Quarter	1	2	3	4	Total
**Buccaneers**	0	6	0	3	**9**
Panthers	0	0	0	0	**0**

at Bank of America Stadium, Charlotte, North Carolina

- Date: January 7
- Game time: 1:00 p.m. EST
- Game weather: Partly cloudy, 54 °F (12 °C)
- Game attendance: 69,010
- Referee: Clete Blakeman
- TV announcers (Fox): Kenny Albert, Jonathan Vilma and Shannon Spake
- Recap, Game Book

Game information

**First quarter**

- No scoring plays.

**Second quarter**

- TB – Chase McLaughlin 36-yard field goal, 4:13. Buccaneers 3–0. **Drive: 8 plays, 53 yards, 5:00.**
- TB – Chase McLaughlin 57-yard field goal, 0:00. Buccaneers 6–0. **Drive: 9 plays, 17 yards, 1:11.**

**Third quarter**

- No scoring plays.

**Fourth quarter**

- TB – Chase McLaughlin 39-yard field goal, 10:18. Buccaneers 9–0. **Drive: 9 plays, 37 yards, 4:42.**

**Top passers**

- TB – Baker Mayfield – 20/32, 137 yards
- CAR – Bryce Young – 11/18, 94 yards

**Top rushers**

- TB – Rachaad White – 19 rushes, 75 yards
- CAR – Chuba Hubbard – 23 rushes, 83 yards

**Top receivers**

- TB – Chris Godwin – 6 receptions, 51 yards
- CAR – D. J. Chark – 2 receptions, 46 yards

Tampa Bay traveled to division rival Carolina for the final game of the regular season. Chase McLaughlin went three-for-three, kicking three field goals for a 9–0 victory. Quarterback Baker Mayfield, playing with sore ribs from an injury suffered the previous week, was held to only 127 yards passing, but committed no turnovers. The Tampa Bay defense held Carolina to only 199 yards of offense, and shutout the Panthers for the first time.

Mistakes doomed the Panthers. An apparent 43-yard touchdown pass from Bryce Young to D. J. Chark was snuffed out when Antoine Winfield Jr. punched the ball out at the 1 yard line, resulting in a touchback. Later, a 28-yard touchdown run by Raheem Blackshear was called back due to a penalty.

With the victory, the Buccaneers swept season series and clinched the NFC South division title for the third season in a row.

=== Standings ===
==== Division ====
NFC South
	W	L	T	PCT	DIV	CONF	PF	PA	STK
^{(4)} Tampa Bay Buccaneers	9	8	0	.529	4–2	7–5	348	325	W1
New Orleans Saints	9	8	0	.529	4–2	6–6	402	327	W2
Atlanta Falcons	7	10	0	.412	3–3	4–8	321	373	L2
Carolina Panthers	2	15	0	.118	1–5	1–11	236	416	L3

==== Conference ====
NFC
#	Team	Division	W	L	T	PCT	DIV	CONF	SOS	SOV	STK
**Division leaders**
1 (Note: San Francisco finished ahead of Dallas and Detroit based on conference record, claiming the No. 1 seed.)	San Francisco 49ers	West	12	5	0	.706	5–1	10–2	.509	.475	L1
2 (Note: Dallas claimed the No. 2 seed over Detroit based on head-to-head victory.)	Dallas Cowboys	East	12	5	0	.706	5–1	9–3	.446	.392	W2
3	Detroit Lions	North	12	5	0	.706	4–2	8–4	.481	.436	W1
4 (Note: Tampa Bay finished ahead of New Orleans in the NFC South based on common record. (Tampa Bay is 8–4 against Minnesota, Chicago, Detroit, Green Bay, Atlanta, Carolina, Houston, Tennessee, Jacksonville, and Indianapolis, while New Orleans is 6–6 against the same teams.))	Tampa Bay Buccaneers	South	9	8	0	.529	4–2	7–5	.481	.379	W1
**Wild cards**
5	Philadelphia Eagles	East	11	6	0	.647	4–2	7–5	.481	.476	L2
6	Los Angeles Rams	West	10	7	0	.588	5–1	8–4	.529	.453	W4
7 (Note: Green Bay and Seattle finished ahead of New Orleans based on conference record.) (Note: Green Bay finished ahead of Seattle based on strength of victory, claiming the 7th and final playoff spot.)	Green Bay Packers	North	9	8	0	.529	4–2	7–5	.474	.458	W3
**Did not qualify for the postseason**
8	Seattle Seahawks	West	9	8	0	.529	2–4	7–5	.512	.392	W1
9	New Orleans Saints	South	9	8	0	.529	4–2	6–6	.433	.340	W2
10 (Note: Minnesota finished ahead of Atlanta based on head-to-head victory. Division tie break was initially used to eliminate Chicago (see below).) (Note: Minnesota finished ahead of Chicago based on common record. (Minnesota is 5–7 against Tampa Bay, Los Angeles Chargers, Carolina, Kansas City, Green Bay, Atlanta, New Orleans, Denver, Las Vegas, and Detroit, while Chicago is 4–8 against the same teams.))	Minnesota Vikings	North	7	10	0	.412	2–4	6–6	.509	.454	L4
11 (Note: Chicago finished ahead of Atlanta based on head-to-head victory.)	Chicago Bears	North	7	10	0	.412	2–4	6–6	.464	.370	L1
12	Atlanta Falcons	South	7	10	0	.412	3–3	4–8	.429	.462	L2
13	New York Giants	East	6	11	0	.353	3–3	5–7	.512	.353	W1
14 (Note: Washington finished ahead of Arizona based on head-to-head victory.)	Washington Commanders	East	4	13	0	.235	0–6	2–10	.512	.338	L8
15	Arizona Cardinals	West	4	13	0	.235	0–6	3–9	.561	.588	L1
16	Carolina Panthers	South	2	15	0	.118	1–5	1–11	.522	.500	L3
**Tiebreakers** (Note: When breaking ties for three or more teams under the NFL's rules, they are first broken within divisions, then comparing only the highest-ranked remaining team from each division.)

== Postseason ==
=== Schedule ===
Round	Date	Opponent (seed)	Result	Record	Venue	Recap
Wild Card	January 15	Philadelphia Eagles (5)	W 32–9	1–0	Raymond James Stadium	Recap
Divisional	January 21	at Detroit Lions (3)	L 23–31	1–1	Ford Field	Recap

=== Game summaries ===
==== NFC Wild Card Playoffs: vs. (5) Philadelphia Eagles ====
NFC Wild Card Playoffs: (5) Philadelphia Eagles at (4) Tampa Bay Buccaneers – Game summary

Quarter	1	2	3	4	Total
Eagles	0	9	0	0	9
Buccaneers	10	6	9	7	32

at Raymond James Stadium, Tampa, Florida

- Date: January 15, 2024
- Game time: 8:15 p.m. EST
- Game weather: Cloudy, 67 °F (19 °C)
- Game attendance: 63,397
- Referee: Adrian Hill
- TV announcers (ABC/ESPN/ESPN2): Joe Buck, Troy Aikman, Lisa Salters and Laura Rutledge
- Recap, Game Book

Game information

First quarter

- TB – Chase McLaughlin 28-yard field goal, 10:02. Buccaneers 3–0. Drive: 12 plays, 65 yards, 4:58.
- TB – David Moore 44-yard pass from Baker Mayfield (Chase McLaughlin kick), 5:47. Buccaneers 10–0. Drive: 4 plays, 79 yards, 1:20.

Second quarter

- TB – Chase McLaughlin 54-yard field goal, 14:03. Buccaneers 13–0. Drive: 10 plays, 40 yards, 5:19.
- PHI – Jake Elliott 47-yard field goal, 11:31. Buccaneers 13–3. Drive: 7 plays, 45 yards, 2:32.
- TB – Chase McLaughlin 48-yard field goal, 5:35. Buccaneers 16–3. Drive: 15 plays, 45 yards, 5:56.
- PHI – Dallas Goedert 5-yard pass from Jalen Hurts (two-point conversion failed), 3:06. Buccaneers 16–9. Drive: 5 plays, 75 yards, 2:29.

Third quarter

- TB – Jalen Hurts intentional grounding in endzone resulting in TB safety, 2:16. Buccaneers 18–9.
- TB – Trey Palmer 56-yard pass from Baker Mayfield (Chase McLaughlin kick), 1:19. Buccaneers 25–9. Drive: 2 plays, 62 yards, 0:59.

Fourth quarter

- TB – Chris Godwin 23-yard pass from Baker Mayfield (Chase McLaughlin kick), 5:42. Buccaneers 32–9. Drive: 12 plays, 83 yards, 6:15.

Top passers

- PHI – Jalen Hurts – 25/35, 250 yards, TD
- TB – Baker Mayfield – 22/36, 337 yards, 3 TD

Top rushers

- PHI – D'Andre Swift – 10 rushes, 34 yards
- TB – Rachaad White – 18 rushes, 72 yards

Top receivers

- PHI – DeVonta Smith – 8 receptions, 148 yards
- TB – Cade Otton – 8 receptions, 89 yards

This was the sixth postseason meeting between the Eagles and Buccaneers, with the Buccaneers winning three of the previous five. The most recent postseason meeting between two teams came in the 2021 NFC Wild Card Game, which the Buccaneers won 31–15 in Tampa. In the regular season, the Eagles defeated the Buccaneers in Tampa by a score of 25–11 during Week 3.

Tampa Bay built a 10–0 lead in the first quarter. After a field goal by Chase McLaughlin, quarterback Baker Mayfield found David Moore for a 44-yard catch-and-run touchdown. Moore eluded four defenders, cutting back and forth on his way to the endzone. The Buccaneers and Eagles traded field goals in the second quarter. With the score 16–3 in favor of Tampa Bay, Dallas Goedert scored a 5-yard touchdown catch for Philadelphia. After a penalty on the extra point, the Eagles elected to take the point off the board, and instead attempted a two-point conversion. Using their signature "tush push", they were denied by the Buccaneers defense.

Tampa Bay put the game out of reach in the second half. A safety on Jalen Hurts was followed by a touchdown from Trey Palmer, in which the Eagles' poor tackling efforts facilitated his 56-yard run to the end zone. Late in the fourth quarter, Chris Godwin's third down touchdown pass at the goal line sealed Tampa Bay's 23-point blowout of the defending NFC champions.

==== NFC Divisional Playoffs: at (3) Detroit Lions ====
NFC Divisional Playoffs: (4) Tampa Bay Buccaneers at (3) Detroit Lions – Game summary

Quarter	1	2	3	4	Total
Buccaneers	3	7	7	6	23
Lions	3	7	7	14	31

at Ford Field, Detroit, Michigan

- Date: January 21, 2024
- Game time: 3:05 p.m. EST
- Game weather: None (indoor stadium)
- Game attendance: 66,201
- Referee: Bill Vinovich
- TV announcers (NBC): Mike Tirico, Cris Collinsworth, Melissa Stark and Kaylee Hartung
- Recap, Game Book

Game information

First quarter

- DET – Michael Badgley 23-yard field goal, 8:25. Lions 3–0. Drive: 8 plays, 37 yards, 2:43.
- TB – Chase McLaughlin 43-yard field goal, 4:19. Tied 3–3. Drive: 8 plays, 50 yards, 4:06.

Second quarter

- DET – Josh Reynolds 9-yard pass from Jared Goff (Michael Badgley kick), 12:33. Lions 10–3. Drive: 14 plays, 75 yards, 6:46.
- TB – Cade Otton 2-yard pass from Baker Mayfield (Chase McLaughlin kick), 0:15. Tied 10–10. Drive: 7 plays, 92 yards, 1:13.

Third quarter

- DET – Craig Reynolds 1-yard run (Michael Badgley kick), 3:48. Lions 17–10. Drive: 10 plays, 64 yards, 4:25.
- TB – Rachaad White 12-yard pass from Baker Mayfield (Chase McLaughlin kick), 0:10. Tied 17–17. Drive: 7 plays, 75 yards, 3:38.

Fourth quarter

- DET – Jahmyr Gibbs 31-yard run (Michael Badgley kick), 13:13. Lions 24–17. Drive: 5 plays, 75 yards, 1:57.
- DET – Amon-Ra St. Brown 9-yard pass from Jared Goff (Michael Badgley kick), 6:22. Lions 31–17. Drive: 10 plays, 89 yards, 6:22.
- TB – Mike Evans 16-yard pass from Baker Mayfield (two-point conversion failed), 4:37. Lions 31–23. Drive: 9 plays, 75 yards, 1:45.

Top passers

- TB – Baker Mayfield – 26/41, 349 yards, 3 TD, 2 INT
- DET – Jared Goff – 30/43, 287 yards, 2 TD

Top rushers

- TB – Rachaad White – 9 rushes, 55 yards
- DET – Jahmyr Gibbs – 9 rushes, 74 yards, TD

Top receivers

- TB – Mike Evans – 8 receptions, 141 yards, TD
- DET – Amon-Ra St. Brown – 8 receptions, 77 yards, TD

This was the second postseason meeting between the Buccaneers and Lions. The Buccaneers won the first meeting, which came in the 1997 NFC Wild Card Game, by a score of 20–10 at Houlihan's Stadium in Tampa, the Bucs' last game their original home field. In the regular season, the Lions won the meeting between the two teams by a score of 20–6 in Week 6 in Tampa.

== Awards ==
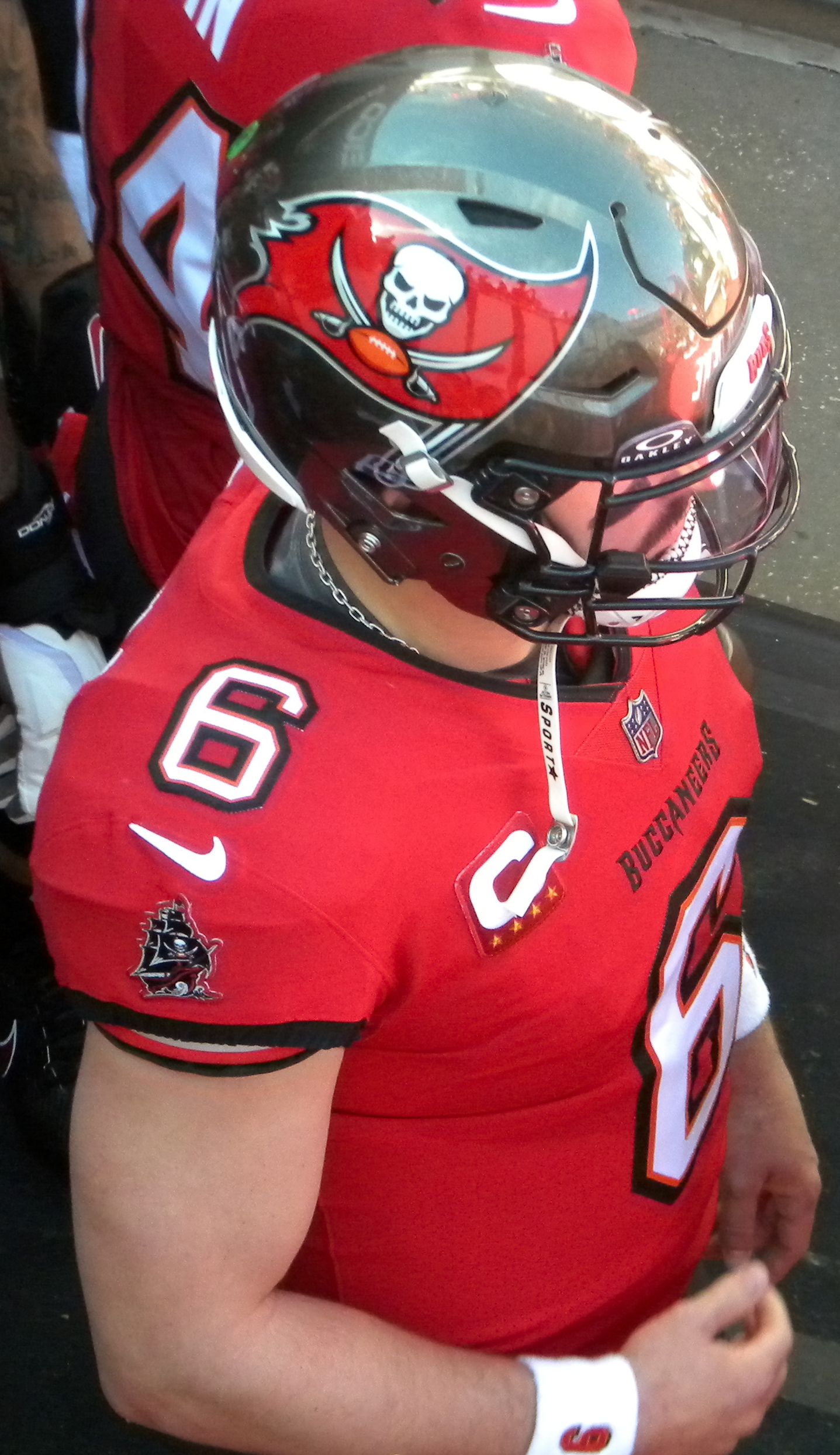
Baker Mayfield

Recipient	Award(s)
Baker Mayfield	Week 15: NFC Offensive Player of the Week; Week 15: FedEx Air Player of the Week; Week 15: Nickelodeon Valuable Player
Antoine Winfield Jr.	Week 13: NFC Defensive Player of the Week; Week 18: NFC Defensive Player of the Week; December–January: NFC Defensive Player of the Month
Jake Camarda	Week 2: NFC Special Teams Player of the Week; September: NFC Special Teams Player of the Month
Calijah Kancey	November: Defensive Rookie of the Month
Mike Evans	Week 2: Nickelodeon Valuable Player
