= Christian Izien =

American football player (born 2000)

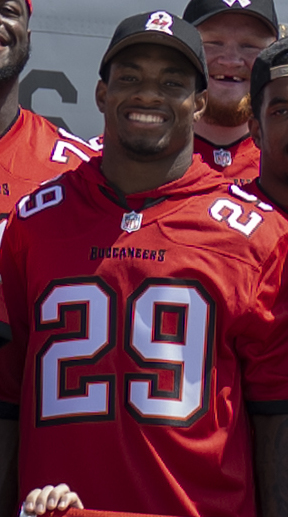
- Izien with the Tampa Bay Buccaneers in 2023

No. 5 – Detroit Lions
- Position: Safety
- Roster status: Active

Personal information
- Born: June 8, 2000 (age 26); Far Rockaway, New York, U.S.
- Listed height: 5 ft 10 in (1.78 m)
- Listed weight: 206 lb (93 kg)

Career information
- High school: Erasmus Hall (Flatbush, New York)
- College: Rutgers (2018–2022)
- NFL draft: 2023: undrafted

Career history
- Tampa Bay Buccaneers (2023–2025); Detroit Lions (2026–present)

Career NFL statistics as of 2025
- Total tackles: 165
- Interceptions: 3
- Pass deflections: 5
- Forced fumbles: 3
- Stats at Pro Football Reference

Christian Izien (born June 8, 2000) is an American professional football safety for the Detroit Lions of the National Football League (NFL). He played college football for the Rutgers Scarlet Knights and was signed by the Tampa Bay Buccaneers as an undrafted free agent after the 2023 NFL draft.

== Early life ==
Izien was born on June 8, 2000. He grew up in Far Rockaway, New York, and attended Erasmus Hall High School. A two-way player as a cornerback and wide receiver, he earned New York City Defensive Player of the Year honors as a senior. Ranked a three-star recruit, he opted to be near home by committing to play college football for the Rutgers Scarlet Knights. He is of Nigerian descent.

== College career ==
As a true freshman at Rutgers in 2018, Izien appeared in four games as a special teams player. He played all 12 games as a sophomore, totaling a secondary-leading 78 tackles while starting seven times. He started all nine games in the COVID-19-shortened 2020 season, leading the team with four interceptions while also having 66 tackles. Izien started all 13 games in 2021, being named honorable mention all-conference while having 75 tackles. He again started every game in 2022, finishing with 41 consecutive starts while having 80 tackles on the year, earning another honorable mention all-conference selection. Izien declared for the 2023 NFL draft and was invited to the Hula Bowl and East–West Shrine Bowl.

== Professional career ==
Pre-draft measurables
Height	Weight	Arm length	Hand span	Wingspan	40-yard dash	10-yard split	20-yard split	20-yard shuttle	Three-cone drill	Vertical jump	Broad jump	Bench press
5 ft 8 3/4 in (1.75 m)	199 lb (90 kg)	30 7/8 in (0.78 m)	9 1/4 in (0.23 m)	6 ft 1 1/4 in (1.86 m)	4.43 s	1.59 s	2.50 s	4.25 s	6.81 s	41.5 in (1.05 m)	9 ft 11 in (3.02 m)	20 reps
All values from Pro Day

=== Tampa Bay Buccaneers ===
After going unselected in the 2023 NFL draft, Izien was signed by the Tampa Bay Buccaneers as an undrafted free agent. He impressed in the off-season and made the final roster, being named the starting nickelback as a rookie. He had interceptions in his first two games, becoming only the fourth undrafted player in NFL history to accomplish the feat. As a rookie, he appeared in all 17 regular season games and made four starts. He finished with 65 total tackles (47 solo), two interceptions, two passes defended, and one forced fumble.

Izien made 14 appearances (10 starts) for Tampa Bay in 2024, totaling one interception, three pass deflections, one forced fumble, and 75 combined tackles. On December 26, 2024, Izien was placed on injured reserve with a pectoral injury, ending his season.

=== Detroit Lions ===
On March 13, 2026, Izien signed with the Detroit Lions on a one-year contract.

== NFL career statistics ==
=== Regular season ===
Year	Team	Games		Tackles					Interceptions						Fumbles			
Year	Team	GP	GS	Cmb	Solo	Ast	Sck	TFL	PD	Int	Yds	Avg	Lng	TD	FF	FR	Yds	TD
2023	TB	17	4	65	47	18	0.0	3	2	2	18	9.0	14	0	1	0	0	0
2024	TB	14	10	75	48	27	0.0	4	3	1	17	17.0	17	0	1	0	0	0
2025	TB	14	1	25	16	9	0.0	1	0	0	0	0.0	0	0	1	0	0	0
Career		45	15	165	111	54	0.0	8	5	3	35	11.6	17	0	3	0	0	0
