= Trey Palmer =

American football player (born 2001)

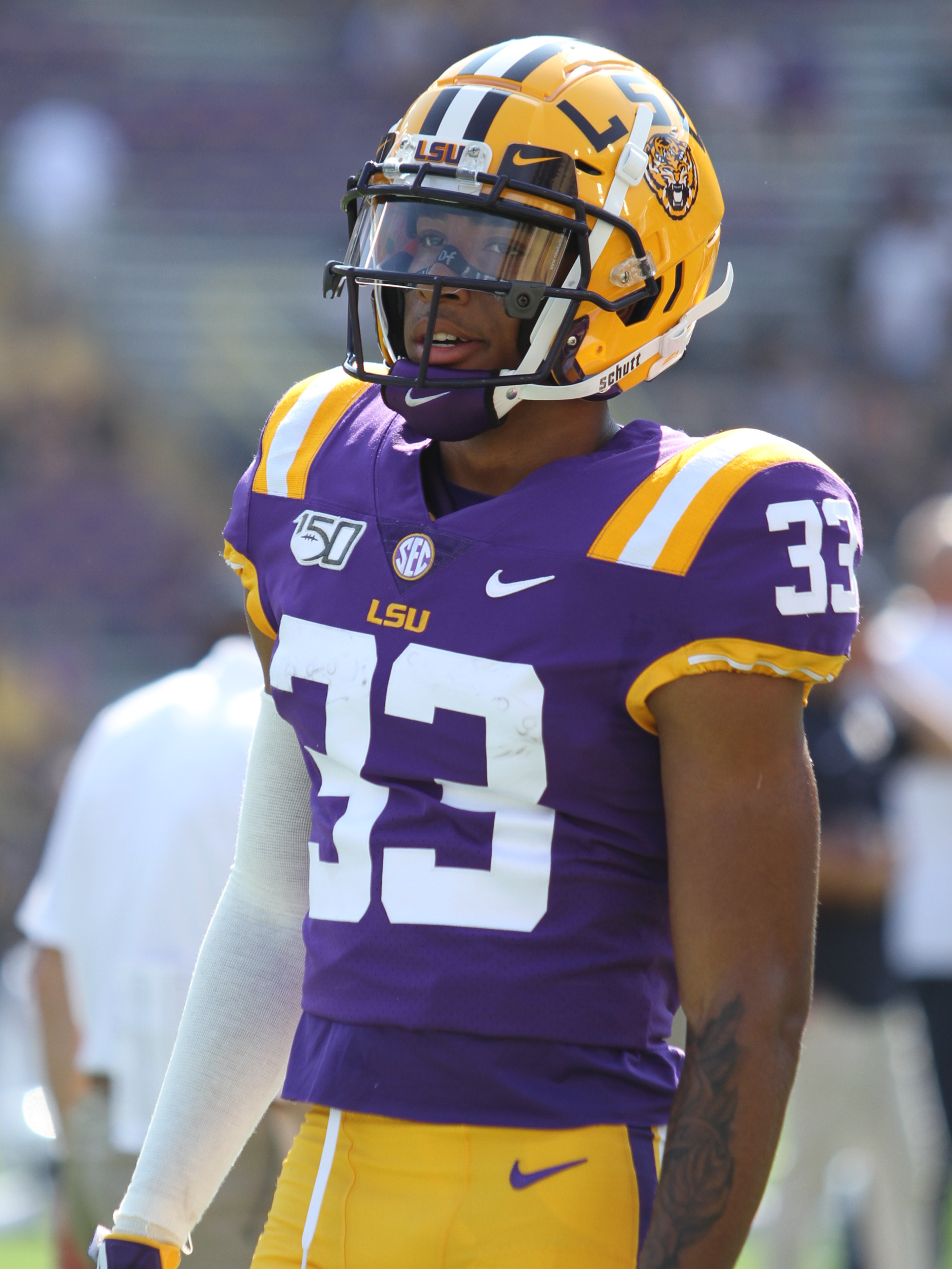
- Palmer with the LSU Tigers in 2019

Profile
- Position: Wide receiver

Personal information
- Born: April 2, 2001 (age 25); Kentwood, Louisiana, U.S.
- Listed height: 6 ft 1 in (1.85 m)
- Listed weight: 190 lb (86 kg)

Career information
- High school: Kentwood (LA)
- College: LSU (2019–2021); Nebraska (2022)
- NFL draft: 2023: 6th round, 191st overall pick

Career history
- Tampa Bay Buccaneers (2023–2024); New Orleans Saints (2025–2026)

Awards and highlights
- CFP national champion (2019); Second-team All-Big Ten (2022)

Career NFL statistics as of 2024
- Receptions: 51
- Receiving yards: 557
- Receiving average: 10.9
- Receiving touchdowns: 4
- Stats at Pro Football Reference

Raymontre "Trey" Palmer (born April 2, 2001) is an American professional football wide receiver. He played college football for the LSU Tigers and Nebraska Cornhuskers. He was selected by the Tampa Bay Buccaneers in the sixth round of the 2023 NFL draft.

== Early life ==
Palmer attended Kentwood High Magnet School in Kentwood, Louisiana, where he played wide receiver and safety. He committed to Louisiana State University (LSU) to play college football.

== College career ==
Palmer played at LSU from 2019 to 2021, totaling 41 receptions for 458 yards and three touchdowns across 28 games. He transferred to the University of Nebraska–Lincoln in 2022. In his final game against Iowa, he caught nine passes for 165 yards and two touchdowns to set the single-season record for most receiving yards (1,043) and total receptions (71) by a Nebraska wide receiver.

== Professional career ==
Pre-draft measurables
Height	Weight	Arm length	Hand span	Wingspan	40-yard dash	10-yard split	20-yard split	20-yard shuttle	Three-cone drill	Vertical jump	Broad jump
6 ft 0 1/4 in (1.84 m)	192 lb (87 kg)	31 7/8 in (0.81 m)	9 5/8 in (0.24 m)	6 ft 4 1/8 in (1.93 m)	4.33 s	1.51 s	2.52 s	4.26 s	7.13 s	29.5 in (0.75 m)	9 ft 6 in (2.90 m)
All values from NFL Combine/Pro Day

=== Tampa Bay Buccaneers ===
The Tampa Bay Buccaneers drafted Palmer in the sixth round of the 2023 NFL draft with the 191st overall pick. He debuted in Week 1 against the Minnesota Vikings, hauling in a 7-yard touchdown catch in the 20–17 win. Palmer finished his rookie season with 39 receptions for 385 yards and three touchdowns. In his team's Wild Card round victory over the Philadelphia Eagles in the 2023–24 NFL playoffs, he scored his first postseason touchdown on a 56-yard reception.

On August 26, 2025, Palmer was waived by the Buccaneers as part of final roster cuts.

=== New Orleans Saints ===
On August 27, 2025, Palmer was claimed off waivers by the New Orleans Saints. He did not appear in a game for New Orleans before he was placed on injured reserve due to hamstring and ankle injuries on October 4.

On August 30, 2026, Palmer was waived by New Orleans as a part of final roster cuts; he was re–signed to the team's practice squad the following day. On October 13, Palmer was waived.

== NFL career statistics ==
Legend
**Bold**	Career high

=== Regular season ===
Year	Team	Games		Receiving					Rushing					Fumbles	
Year	Team	GP	GS	Rec	Yds	Avg	Lng	TD	Att	Yds	Avg	Lng	TD	Fum	Lost
2023	TB	17	8	39	385	9.9	54	3	3	22	7.3	13	0	3	1
2024	TB	8	3	10	141	14.1	25	1	0	0	0	0	0	0	0
Career		25	11	49	526	10.7	54	4	3	22	7.3	13	0	3	1

=== Postseason ===
Year	Team	Games		Receiving					Rushing					Fumbles	
Year	Team	GP	GS	Rec	Yds	Avg	Lng	TD	Att	Yds	Avg	Lng	TD	Fum	Lost
2023	TB	2	0	3	88	29.3	56	1	1	9	9.0	9	0	0	0
Career		2	0	3	88	29.3	56	1	1	9	9.0	9	0	0	0
