= Shaquil Barrett =

American football player (born 1992)

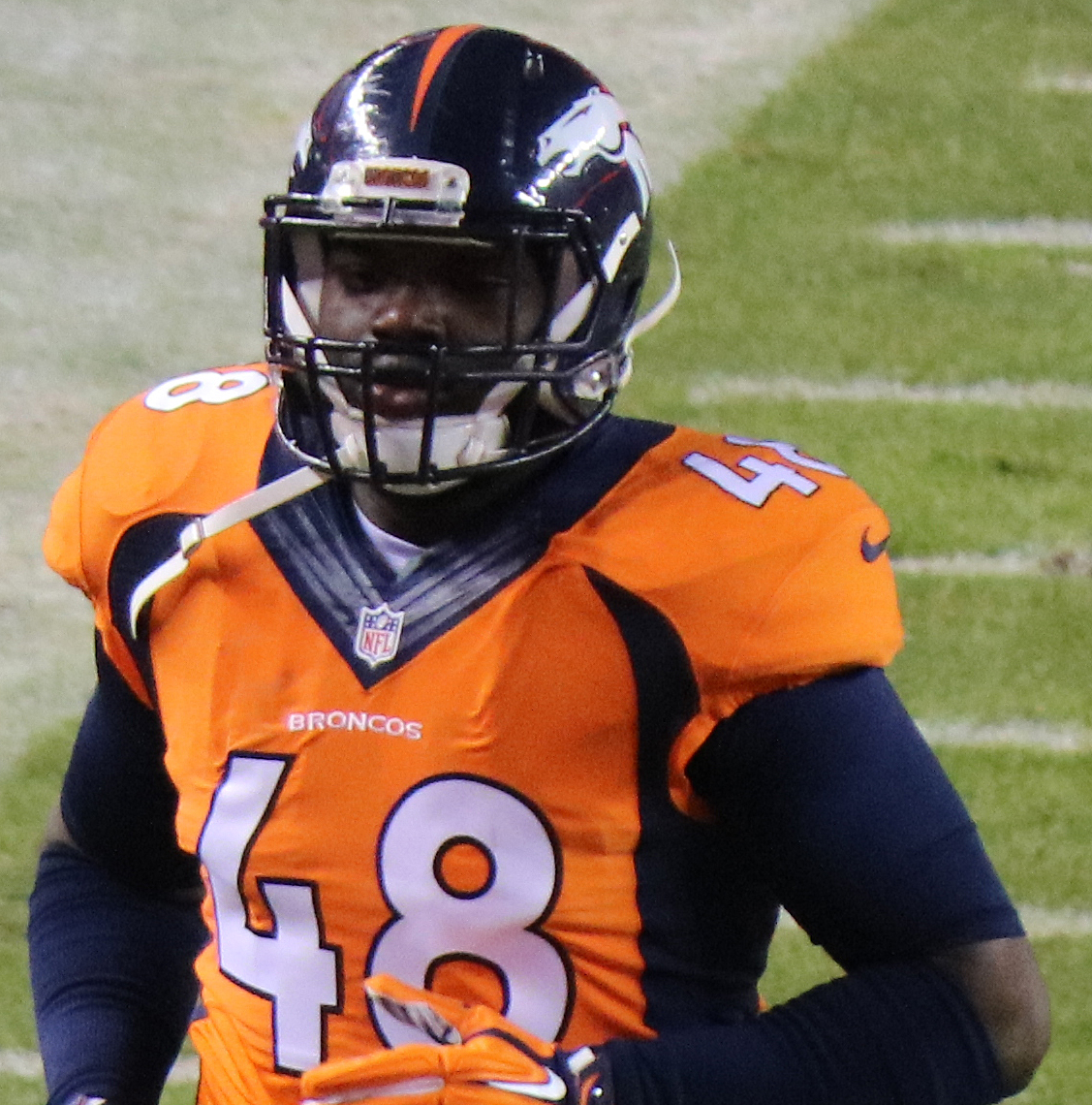
- Barrett with the Denver Broncos in 2015

No. 48, 58, 7, 56
- Position: Linebacker

Personal information
- Born: November 17, 1992 (age 34); Baltimore, Maryland, U.S.
- Listed height: 6 ft 2 in (1.88 m)
- Listed weight: 250 lb (113 kg)

Career information
- High school: Boys Town (Boys Town, Nebraska)
- College: Nebraska–Omaha (2010); Colorado State (2011–2013)
- NFL draft: 2014: undrafted

Career history
- Denver Broncos (2014–2018); Tampa Bay Buccaneers (2019–2023); Miami Dolphins (2024)*; Tampa Bay Buccaneers (2024)
- * Offseason or practice squad member only

Awards and highlights
- 2× Super Bowl champion (50, LV); Second-team All-Pro (2019); 2× Pro Bowl (2019, 2021); Deacon Jones Award (2019); MW Defensive Player of the Year (2013); First-team All-MW (2013)

Career NFL statistics
- Total tackles: 401
- Sacks: 59.0
- Forced fumbles: 22
- Fumble recoveries: 5
- Pass deflections: 18
- Interceptions: 3
- Defensive touchdowns: 1
- Stats at Pro Football Reference

Shaquil Akeem Barrett (born November 17, 1992) is an American former professional football linebacker. He played college football for the Nebraska–Omaha Mavericks before transferring to the Colorado State Rams. Barrett was signed by the Denver Broncos as an undrafted free agent after the 2014 NFL draft. After five seasons with the Broncos, including winning Super Bowl 50, he signed with the Tampa Bay Buccaneers. Barrett's level of play increased, making the Pro Bowl and All-Pro teams in 2019 after leading the league in sacks, and in 2021 won Super Bowl LV, recording a sack in the game. Barrett signed with the Miami Dolphins in 2024 before briefly retiring from football, later returning to the Buccaneers and confirming in 2025 that he was "100 percent done for good" with the NFL.

== College career ==
Barrett started playing college football at Nebraska-Omaha in 2010. After the school eliminated its football program after the 2010 season, he transferred to Colorado State. Since Barrett was transferring from a school that cut its program, he was eligible to play immediately instead of having to sit out a year. Barrett played three seasons (2011–13) for Colorado State University. He started 35-of-38 games for CSU and totaled 246 tackles (116 solos), 18 sacks, 32.5 tackles for a loss, three interceptions, six passes defended, seven forced fumbles, four fumble recoveries, and three blocked kicks. Barrett was named Mountain West Conference Defensive Player of the Year as a senior in 2013 after ranking fifth in the nation with 12 sacks and 20.5 tackles for a loss.

=== Pre-draft measurables ===
Before entering the 2014 NFL draft, Barrett recorded the following measurables during his pro day.

Pre-draft measurables
! 40-yard dash	20-yard shuttle	Vertical jump	Bench press
4.73 s	4.42 s	29 in (0.74 m)	16 reps
All values from Pro Day.

== Professional career ==
=== Denver Broncos ===
==== 2014 ====
Barrett went undrafted in the 2014 NFL draft and received interest from the Denver Broncos and Pittsburgh Steelers as an undrafted free agent. On May 10, 2014, the Broncos signed him to a three-year, $1.53 million contract that included a signing bonus of $3,500. Barrett stated that his decision to choose to sign with the Broncos was due to their willingness to look past draft rankings.

Throughout training camp, Barrett competed for a roster spot as a backup linebacker against Steven Johnson, L. J. Fort, Jamar Chaney, Jerrell Harris, and Corey Nelson. On August 30, 2014, the Broncos waived Barrett as part of their final roster cuts. He was subsequently signed to their practice squad after clearing waivers the following day.

On October 14, 2014, the Broncos promoted Barrett to their active roster after an injury to starting linebacker Danny Trevathan. Barrett was signed to the 53-man roster for the Week 7 game against the San Francisco 49ers. He was once again signed to the 53-man roster for the Divisional Round against the Indianapolis Colts, but did not play. Barrett did not appear in any games as a rookie in 2014.

==== 2015 ====
Barrett switched to jersey No. 56, but subsequently sold it to rookie linebacker and 2015 first round Shane Ray for $2,000 a few weeks later. He reverted back to his rookie No. 48. After finishing the 2015 NFL preseason with the most sacks of any player on the team, Barrett made the final 53-man roster. Head coach Gary Kubiak named Barrett the third string strongside linebacker to begin the regular season, behind Von Miller and Lerentee McCray.

Barrett made his NFL debut in the season-opener against the Baltimore Ravens. He recorded a tackle and a special teams stop in the 19–13 victory. During a Week 6 26–23 overtime road victory over the Cleveland Browns, Barrett made his first NFL start after DeMarcus Ware suffered a back injury. He finished the game with nine tackles (six solo), 1.5 sacks, three tackles for loss, a pass defensed, a forced fumble, and a fumble recovery.

Barrett finished his second professional season with 50 tackles, 5.5 sacks, four passes defensed, four forced fumbles, two fumble recoveries, and nine special-teams tackles in 16 games and six starts. The Broncos finished atop the AFC West with a 12–4 record and earned a first-round bye in the playoffs. Barrett tallied two tackles and one special-teams stop in Denver's three postseason games. On February 7, 2016, Barrett played in Super Bowl 50, but left the game to be evaluated with a concussion. He returned to finish the game and the Broncos defeated the Carolina Panthers by a score of 24–10.

==== 2016 ====
In 2016, Barrett played all 16 games and totaled 36 tackles (20 solo), 1.5 sacks, a forced fumble, and two passes defensed.

==== 2017 ====
In 2017, Barrett appeared in 16 games (nine starts), totaling 37 tackles (30 solo), four sacks, two forced fumbles, a fumble recovery, and a blocked punt.

==== 2018 ====
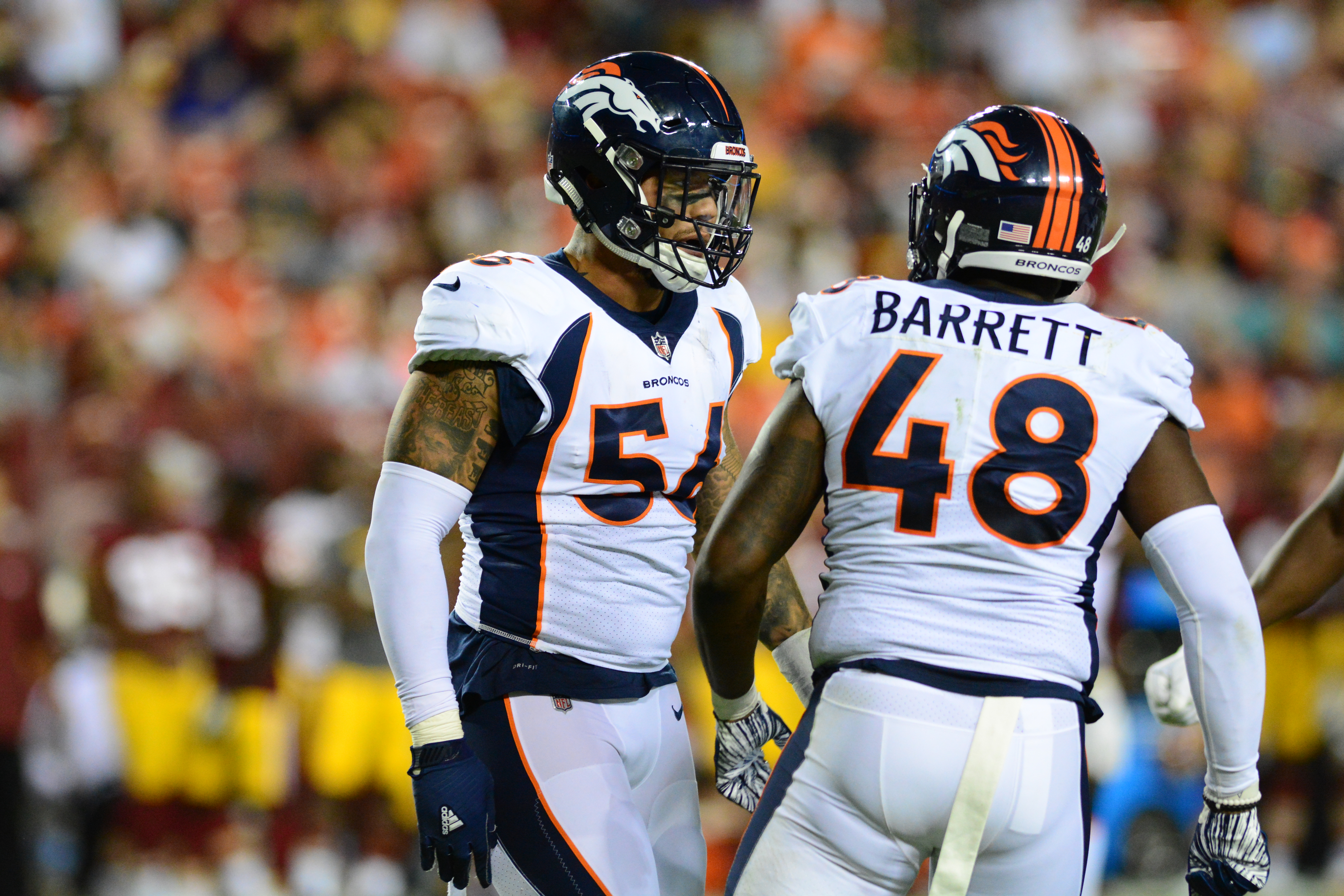
Shane Ray and Barrett in 2018

On March 12, 2018, the Broncos placed a second-round restricted free agent tender on Barrett. On April 23, he signed his exclusive rights tender. Barrett finished the season with 28 tackles, three sacks, and a pass defended in 13 games.

=== Tampa Bay Buccaneers (first stint) ===
==== 2019 ====
On March 15, 2019, Barrett signed a one-year contract with the Tampa Bay Buccaneers.

During a Week 2 20–14 road victory over the Panthers, Barrett sacked Cam Newton thrice. With his strong performance, Barrett earned National Football Conference (NFC) Defensive Player of the Week honors. In the next game against the New York Giants, Barrett recorded a career-best four sacks and two forced fumbles, tying the franchise single-game sack record held by Simeon Rice and Marcus Jones, as well as becoming the first player in franchise history to record at least three sacks in back to back games. The Buccaneers narrowly lost 32–31. The following week, Barrett recorded his first NFL interception and a strip-sack on Jared Goff which was returned for a touchdown by teammate Ndamukong Suh in a 55–40 road victory over the Los Angeles Rams. As a result of his strong first month of play (nine sacks, an interception, three forced fumbles at the end of Week 4), Barrett was named the NFC Defensive Player of the Month for September.

During a Week 15 38–17 road victory over the Detroit Lions, Barrett recorded five tackles and a sack, tying the Buccaneers franchise record for sacks in a single season held by Warren Sapp. On December 17, 2019, Barrett was selected to the 2020 Pro Bowl, the first of his career. In the regular-season finale against the Atlanta Falcons, he sacked Matt Ryan thrice in the 28–22 overtime loss, breaking the Buccaneers franchise record set by Sapp for the most sacks in a single season with 19.5.

Barrett finished the 2019 season setting new career highs with a league leading 19.5 sacks, 58 tackles, six forced fumbles, two pass deflections, and an interception in 16 games and starts. He was ranked 32nd by his fellow players on the NFL Top 100 Players of 2020.

==== 2020 ====
On March 16, 2020, the Buccaneers placed the franchise tag on Barrett. He signed the one-year tender on July 15, 2020, worth around $15.8 million.

During a Week 3 28–10 road victory over his former team, the Broncos, Barrett had six total tackles and two sacks which included his first career safety on quarterback Jeff Driskel. Barrett was named NFC Defensive Player of the Week for his performance. In Week 9 against the New Orleans Saints on Sunday Night Football, Barrett recorded four tackles and a strip-sack on Drew Brees that was recovered by the Buccaneers during the 38–3 loss. Three weeks later against the Kansas City Chiefs, Barrett recorded a strip-sack on Patrick Mahomes that was recovered by the Buccaneers in the 27–24 loss. In Week 14 against the Minnesota Vikings, Barrett recorded two sacks on Kirk Cousins and four tackles as the Buccaneers won 26–14.

Barrett was placed on the reserve/COVID-19 list by the Buccaneers on January 1, 2021, As a result, he missed the regular-season finale against the Falcons and was activated on January 6.

Barrett finished the 2020 season with 57 total tackles, eight sacks, three passes defended, and two forced fumbles in 15 games and starts. He recorded five total tackles and sacked Aaron Rodgers thrice during the NFC Championship Game as the Buccaneers defeated the Green Bay Packers 31–26 to advance to Super Bowl LV. Tampa Bay defeated the Chiefs by a score of 31–9 in the Super Bowl, giving Barrett his second Super Bowl ring. During the game, Barrett sacked Patrick Mahomes once, his only tackle of the game. He was ranked 88th by his fellow players on the NFL Top 100 Players of 2021.

==== 2021 ====
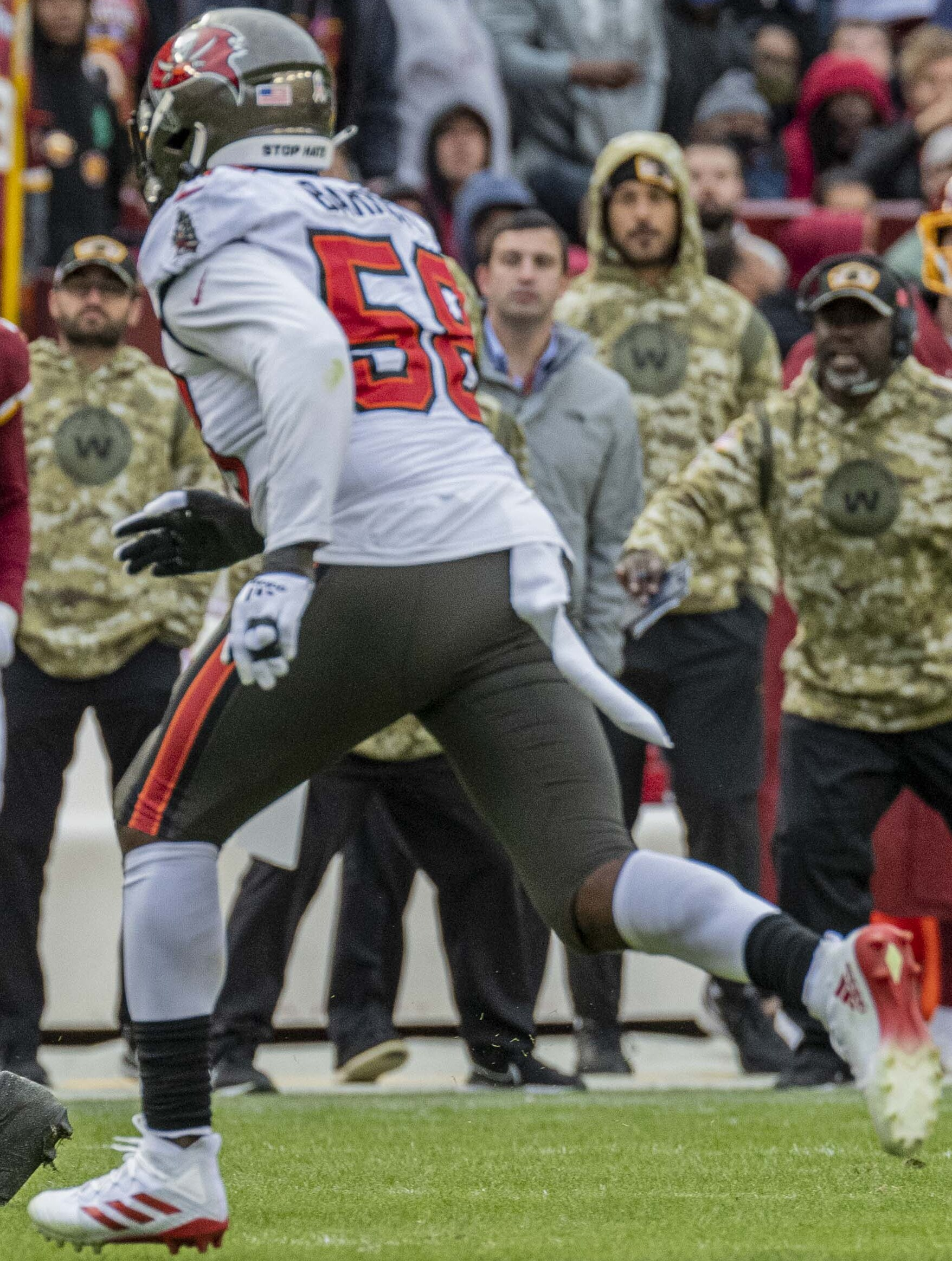
Barrett in 2021

On March 17, 2021, Barrett signed a four-year contract extension, worth $72 million ($36 million guaranteed) with the Buccaneers.

During the season-opening 31–29 victory over the Dallas Cowboys, Barrett recorded four tackles and sacked Dak Prescott once. In the next game against the Falcons, Barrett recorded two tackles, a pass deflection, and an interception in the 48–25 victory. Two weeks later against the New England Patriots, Barrett recorded three tackles, a pass deflection, and a sack in the narrow 19–17 road victory. During a Week 5 45–17 victory over the Miami Dolphins, he recorded four tackles, 1.5 sacks, and a forced fumble. In the next game against the Philadelphia Eagles, Barrett recorded four tackles and a sack in a 28–22 road victory. The following week against the Chicago Bears, he recorded four tackles, a sack, a forced fumble, and a fumble recovery as the Buccaneers won by a score of 38–3. During a Week 12 38–31 road victory over the Colts, Barrett recorded eight tackles, two sacks, a forced fumble, and a fumble recovery. Two weeks later against the Buffalo Bills, he recorded three tackles and 1.5 sacks in the 33–27 overtime victory. He was named to his second Pro Bowl.

Barrett finished the regular season with 51 tackles, 10 sacks, four pass deflections, three forced fumbles, and two fumble recoveries in 15 games and starts. The Buccaneers finished atop the NFC South with a 13–4 record and qualified for the playoffs. In the wild-card round of the 2021–22 NFL playoffs, Barrett recorded an interception and a pass deflection in the 31–15 victory. In the divisional round against the Rams, Barrett recorded three tackles in the narrow 30–27 loss. He was ranked 86th by his fellow players on the NFL Top 100 Players of 2022.

==== 2022 ====
During a Week 8 27–22 loss to the Ravens, Barrett suffered a torn Achilles tendon, prematurely ending his season. He finished the season with 31 tackles, three sacks, and a forced fumble in eight games and starts.

==== 2023 ====
Barrett played and started in 16 games of the 2023 regular season. His biggest play of the season came against the Chicago Bears in Week 2 when he intercepted a pass from Justin Fields and returned it 4 yards for his only career touchdown, sealing a 27–17 win for the Buccaneers in the game's closing minutes. He finished the season with 52 tackles, 4.5 sacks, two passes defended, three forced fumbles, and an interception return for a touchdown.

On March 13, 2024, Barrett was released by the Buccaneers.

=== Miami Dolphins ===
On March 18, 2024, Barrett signed with the Miami Dolphins.

On July 20, 2024, Barrett announced via his Instagram account that he was retiring from the NFL, citing a desire to spend more time with his family. On November 26, Barrett announced his intention to return to the NFL and play for the Dolphins. However, Miami did not activate Barrett from the reserve/retired list, and he was waived on December 26.

=== Tampa Bay Buccaneers (second stint) ===
On December 28, 2024, Barrett re-signed with the Tampa Bay Buccaneers.

=== Retirement ===
Remaining a free agent following the 2024 season, Barrett stated in December 2025 that he was "100 percent done for good now" and confirmed his retirement from professional football, citing a desire to spend more time with his family.

== NFL career statistics ==
Legend
	Won the Super Bowl
	Led the league
**Bold**	Career high

=== Regular season ===
Year	Team	Games		Tackles					Interceptions					Fumbles			
Year	Team	GP	GS	Cmb	Solo	Ast	Sck	Sfty	Int	Yds	Lng	TD	PD	FF	FR	Yds	TD
2014	DEN	0	0	DNP													
2015	DEN	16	6	50	35	15	5.5	0	0	0	0	0	**4**	4	**2**	0	0
2016	DEN	16	0	36	23	13	1.5	0	0	0	0	0	2	1	0	0	0
2017	DEN	16	9	37	31	6	4.0	0	0	0	0	0	0	2	1	0	0
2018	DEN	13	0	28	22	6	3.0	0	0	0	0	0	1	0	0	0	0
2019	TB	16	16	**58**	**45**	13	**19.5**	0	**1**	**4**	**4**	0	2	**6**	0	0	0
2020	TB	15	15	57	43	14	8.0	**1**	0	0	0	0	3	2	0	0	0
2021	TB	15	15	51	37	14	10.0	0	**1**	3	3	0	**4**	3	**2**	**2**	0
2022	TB	8	8	31	20	11	3.0	0	0	0	0	0	0	1	0	0	0
2023	TB	16	16	52	33	**19**	4.5	0	**1**	**4**	**4**	**1**	2	3	0	0	0
2024	TB	1	0	1	1	0	0.0	0	0	0	0	0	0	0	0	0	0
Career		132	85	401	290	111	59.0	1	3	11	4	1	18	22	5	2	0

=== Postseason ===
Year	Team	Games		Tackles					Interceptions					Fumbles			
Year	Team	GP	GS	Cmb	Solo	Ast	Sck	Sfty	Int	Yds	Lng	TD	PD	FF	FR	Yds	TD
2014	DEN	0	0	DNP													
2015	DEN	3	0	3	1	2	0.0	0	0	0	0	0	0	0	0	0	0
2020	TB	4	4	**9**	**6**	**3**	**4.0**	0	0	0	0	0	0	0	0	0	0
2021	TB	2	2	3	2	1	0.0	0	**1**	**17**	**17**	0	**1**	0	0	0	0
2023	TB	2	2	0	0	0	0.0	0	0	0	0	0	0	0	0	0	0
2024	TB	1	0	1	1	0	0.0	0	0	0	0	0	0	0	0	0	0
Career		12	8	16	10	6	4.0	0	1	17	17	0	1	0	0	0	0

=== NFL records ===
- Most sacks through the first three weeks of a season: 8 (2019) (tied with Mark Gastineau)
- Most sacks through the first four weeks of a season: 9 (2019) (tied with Mark Gastineau, Kevin Greene, and Kabeer Gbaja-Biamila)

==== Buccaneers franchise records ====
- Most sacks in a season: 19.5 (2019)
- Most sacks in a game: 4 (tied) (September 22, 2019, vs New York Giants)
- Most forced fumbles in a game: 2 (tied) (September 22, 2019, vs New York Giants)

== Personal life ==
Barrett attended Boys Town (Neb.) High School, where he was an all-state defensive lineman. Barrett was named Athlete of the Year at Boys Town.

Barrett married his wife, Jordanna, on February 2, 2012. They have six children: Shaquil Jr., Braylon, Aaliyah, Arrayah, Allanah, and Amaiah. On April 30, 2023, Arrayah died at age two in an accidental drowning.
