= Rachaad White =

American football player (born 1999)

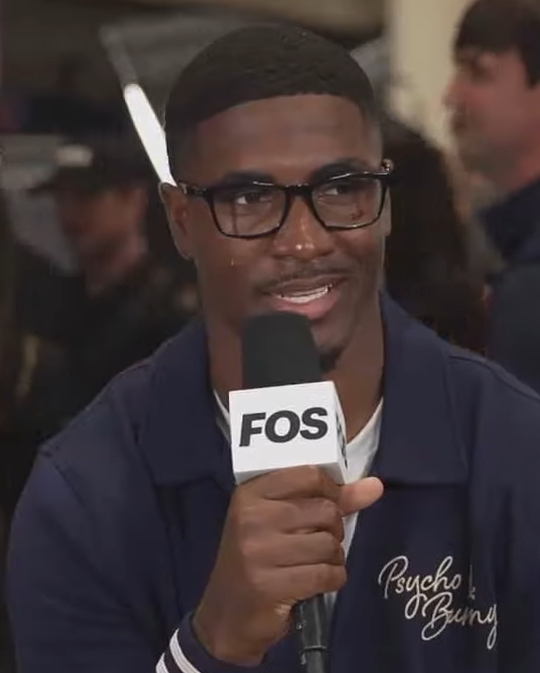
- White in 2025

No. 1 – Washington Commanders
- Position: Running back
- Roster status: Active

Personal information
- Born: January 12, 1999 (age 27); Kansas City, Missouri, U.S.
- Listed height: 6 ft 0 in (1.83 m)
- Listed weight: 214 lb (97 kg)

Career information
- High school: Center (Kansas City)
- College: Nebraska–Kearney (2017); Mt. San Antonio (2018–2019); Arizona State (2020–2021)
- NFL draft: 2022: 3rd round, 91st overall pick

Career history
- Tampa Bay Buccaneers (2022–2025); Washington Commanders (2026–present)

Awards and highlights
- Second-team All-Pac-12 (2021)

Career NFL statistics as of 2025
- Rushing yards: 2,656
- Yards per carry: 3.9
- Rushing touchdowns: 14
- Receptions: 205
- Receiving yards: 1,450
- Receiving touchdowns: 11
- Stats at Pro Football Reference

Rachaad White (rə-SHAWD; born January 12, 1999) is an American professional football running back for the Washington Commanders of the National Football League (NFL). He played college football for the Nebraska–Kearney Lopers, Mt. San Antonio Mounties, and Arizona State Sun Devils. White was selected by the Tampa Bay Buccaneers in the third round of the 2022 NFL draft.

== Early life ==
White grew up in Kansas City, Missouri and attended Center High School. As a senior, he rushed 1,325 yards and totaling over 2,000 all-purpose yards and was named first team Class 3A All-State.

== College career ==
White began his collegiate career at the University of Nebraska at Kearney, where he redshirted as a true freshman. Following the season, he transferred to Mt. San Antonio College. As a sophomore, White rushed for 1,264 yards and 10 touchdowns

White transferred to Arizona State University prior to the 2020 season. In his first season with the Sun Devils, White rushed for 420 yards with five touchdowns on 42 carries while also catching eight passes for 151 yards and one touchdown. He was the first Arizona State player to lead the team in both rushing and receiving yards since 1949. As a senior, White rushed for 1,006 yards and 15 touchdowns on 182 carries and caught 43 passes for 456 yards and one touchdown. He had 28 carries for 202 rushing yards and three rushing touchdowns against USC on November 6. One week later, he had 32 carries for 184 rushing yards and two rushing touchdowns against Washington.

== Professional career ==
Pre-draft measurables
Height	Weight	Arm length	Hand span	Wingspan	40-yard dash	10-yard split	20-yard split	Vertical jump	Broad jump	Bench press
6 ft 0 3/8 in (1.84 m)	214 lb (97 kg)	31 1/4 in (0.79 m)	9 3/4 in (0.25 m)	6 ft 3 3/8 in (1.91 m)	4.48 s	1.59 s	2.58 s	40.0 in (1.02 m)	10 ft 9 in (3.28 m)	20 reps
All values from NFL Combine/Pro Day

=== Tampa Bay Buccaneers ===
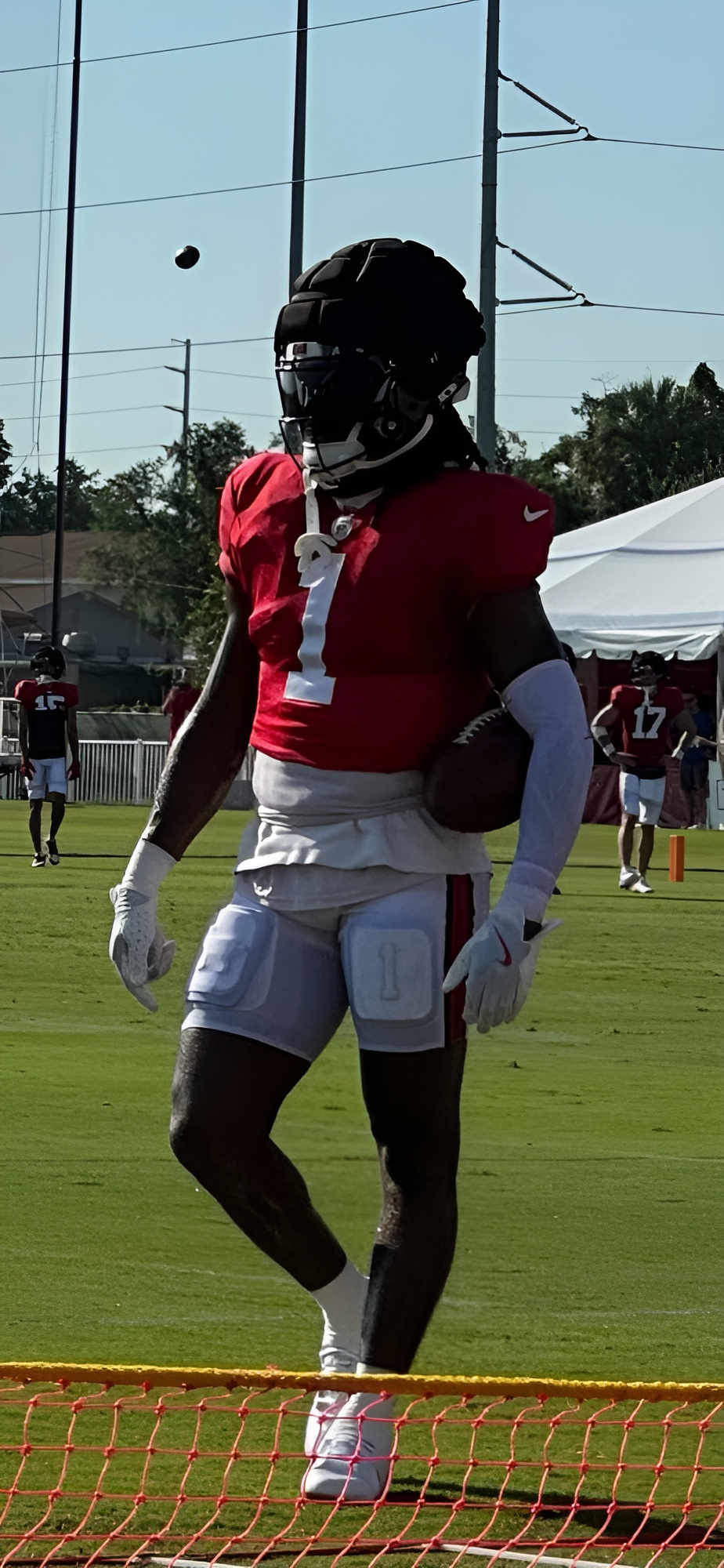
White with the Tampa Bay Buccaneers in 2024

White was drafted by the Tampa Bay Buccaneers in the third round (91st overall) of the 2022 NFL draft.

He made his NFL debut in Week 1 against the Dallas Cowboys. He scored his first NFL touchdown on a one-yard rush against the Kansas City Chiefs in Week 4. In Week 10, against the Seattle Seahawks, he got the start and had 22 carries for 105 rushing yards in the 21–16 victory. In a Week 13 matchup against the New Orleans Saints, quarterback Tom Brady threw a touchdown pass to White with three seconds remaining to complete a 13-point comeback and for White's first professional touchdown reception. Overall, White finished the 2022 season with 129 carries for 481 rushing yards and one rushing touchdown to go along with 50 receptions for 290 receiving yards and two receiving touchdowns. He appeared in all 17 games and started the last eight games of the regular season and the Buccaneers' playoff game.

In the 2023 season, White had 272 carries for 990 rushing yards and three rushing touchdowns to go with 64 receptions for 549 receiving yards and three receiving touchdown. In the Divisional Round, he had a receiving touchdown in the 31–23 loss to the Detroit Lions. In the 2024 season, he had 144 carries for 613 rushing yards and three rushing touchdowns to go with 51 receptions for 393 receiving yards and six receiving touchdowns. In the 2025 season, he had 132 carries for 572 rushing yards and four rushing touchdowns to go with 40 receptions for 218 receiving yards.

=== Washington Commanders ===
On March 13, 2026, White signed a one-year, $2 million contract with the Washington Commanders.

== Career statistics ==
=== NFL ===
==== Regular season ====
Year	Team	Games		Rushing					Receiving					Fumbles	
Year	Team	GP	GS	Att	Yds	Avg	Lng	TD	Rec	Yds	Avg	Lng	TD	Fum	Lost
2022	TB	17	8	129	481	3.7	35	1	50	290	5.8	20	2	3	3
2023	TB	17	17	272	990	3.6	38	6	64	549	8.6	43	3	3	2
2024	TB	16	15	144	613	4.3	56	3	51	393	7.7	32	6	3	0
2025	TB	17	8	132	572	4.3	39	4	40	218	5.5	18	0	0	0
Career		67	48	677	2,656	3.9	56	14	205	1,450	7.1	43	11	9	5

==== Postseason ====
Year	Team	Games		Rushing					Receiving					Fumbles	
Year	Team	GP	GS	Att	Yds	Avg	Lng	TD	Rec	Yds	Avg	Lng	TD	Fum	Lost
2022	TB	1	1	7	41	5.9	12	0	4	36	9.0	11	0	0	0
2023	TB	2	2	27	127	4.7	16	0	5	39	7.8	12	1	0	0
2024	TB	1	0	1	1	1.0	1	0	2	14	7.0	13	0	0	0
Career		4	3	35	169	4.8	16	0	11	89	8.1	13	1	0	0

=== College ===
Season	Team	GP	GS	Rushing					Receiving		
Season	Team	GP	GS	Att	Yds	Avg	Lng	TD	Rec	Yds	TD
2020	ASU	4	4	42	420	10.0	93	5	8	151	1
2021	ASU	11	11	182	1,006	5.5	50	15	43	456	1
Career		15	15	224	1,420	6.4	93	20	51	607	2
