= Keenan Isaac =

American football player (born 2000)

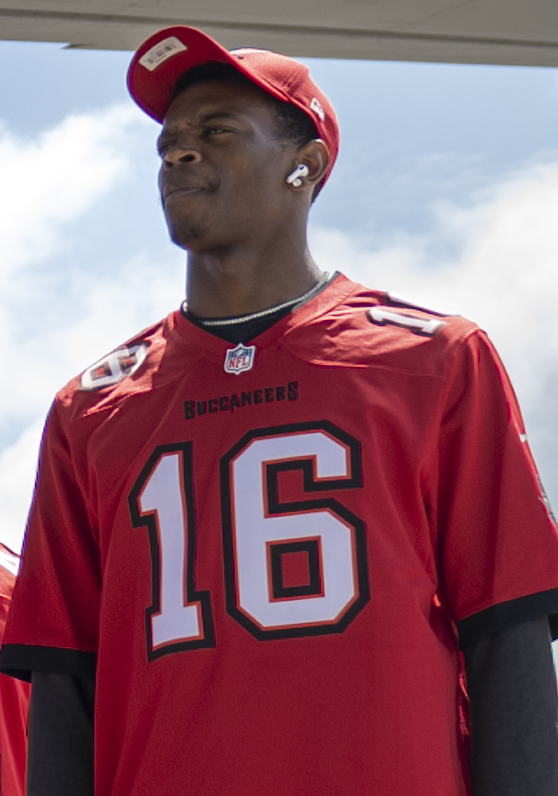
- Isaac with the Tampa Bay Buccaneers in 2023

Toronto Argonauts
- Position: Cornerback
- Roster status: Active
- CFL status: American

Personal information
- Born: February 17, 2000 (age 26); Midfield, Alabama, U.S.
- Listed height: 6 ft 2 in (1.88 m)
- Listed weight: 190 lb (86 kg)

Career information
- High school: Midfield (Midfield, Alabama)
- College: Alabama State (2018–2022)
- NFL draft: 2023: undrafted

Career history
- Tampa Bay Buccaneers (2023); Carolina Panthers (2024); Tampa Bay Buccaneers (2024); Las Vegas Raiders (2024)*; Houston Roughnecks (2025); Cleveland Browns (2025)*; Houston Gamblers (2026)*; Toronto Argonauts (2026–present)
- * Offseason or practice squad member only

Career NFL statistics
- Games played: 7
- Stats at Pro Football Reference

Keenan Isaac (born February 17, 2000) is an American professional football cornerback for the Toronto Argonauts of the Canadian Football League (CFL). He played college football for the Alabama State Hornets and was signed by the Tampa Bay Buccaneers as an undrafted free agent in 2023.

== Early life ==
Isaac was born on February 17, 2000. He grew up in Birmingham, Alabama, and attended Midfield High School, where he played football and basketball. He averaged 18.9 points and 8.2 rebounds per game in basketball and was a two-way player in football. He was a second-team all-state selection in football as a senior and committed to play college football for the Alabama State Hornets over one other offer from Middle Tennessee.

== College career ==
As a true freshman at Alabama State in 2018, Isaac recorded 34 tackles, seven tackles-for-loss, seven pass breakups and an interception while being a starter due to injuries. In 2019, he started all 11 games and posted 55 tackles, third-best on the team, as well as four tackles-for-loss and eight pass breakups. In the COVID-19-impacted 2020–21 season, Isaac played only two games and had five tackles due to an injury that required surgery. He appeared in 11 games in the fall 2021 season, totaling 33 tackles and seven pass breakups. As a senior in 2022, he had 39 tackles, 10 pass breakups and two interceptions. He was invited to the NFLPA Collegiate Bowl and to the HBCU Legacy Bowl.

== Professional career ==
Pre-draft measurables
Height	Weight	Arm length	Hand span	Wingspan	40-yard dash	10-yard split	20-yard split	20-yard shuttle	Three-cone drill	Vertical jump	Broad jump
6 ft 1 1/2 in (1.87 m)	185 lb (84 kg)	32 1/2 in (0.83 m)	8 3/4 in (0.22 m)	6 ft 7 in (2.01 m)	4.59 s	1.55 s	2.65 s	4.25 s	6.90 s	33.0 in (0.84 m)	11 ft 8 in (3.56 m)
All values from Pro Day

=== Tampa Bay Buccaneers (first stint) ===
Isaac was selected in the sixth round (42nd overall) of the 2023 USFL draft by the Houston Gamblers. After going unselected in the 2023 NFL draft, he signed with the Tampa Bay Buccaneers as an undrafted free agent. He was released at the final roster cuts and subsequently re-signed to the practice squad. He was elevated to the active roster for the team's Week 4 game against the New Orleans Saints, and made his NFL debut in the 26–9 win, appearing on 11 special teams snaps. He was signed to the active roster on November 23. Isaac was waived on December 11 and re-signed to the practice squad two days later. He signed a reserve/future contract on January 23, 2024. He was waived on August 27.

=== Carolina Panthers ===
On August 28, 2024, Isaac was claimed off waivers by the Carolina Panthers. He was waived on September 7.

=== Tampa Bay Buccaneers (second stint) ===
On September 10, 2024, three days after being released by the Panthers, Isaac was re-signed by the Tampa Bay Buccaneers following a rash of injuries at the cornerback position during their season opener. He was waived on September 20 and re-signed to the practice squad four days later. Isaac was signed to the active roster on October 15. He was waived again on November 12.

=== Las Vegas Raiders ===
On November 20, 2024, Isaac signed with the Las Vegas Raiders' practice squad. He signed a reserve/future contract with Las Vegas on January 6, 2025. Isaac was released by the Raiders on February 18.

=== Houston Roughnecks ===
On March 4, 2025, Isaac signed with the Houston Roughnecks of the United Football League (UFL).

=== Cleveland Browns ===
Isaac signed with the Cleveland Browns on August 1, 2025. He was waived on August 24.

=== Houston Gamblers ===
On January 13, 2026, Isaac was drafted by the Houston Gamblers of the United Football League (UFL). He was released on March 20.

=== Toronto Argonauts ===
On April 30, 2026, Isaac signed with the Toronto Argonauts of the Canadian Football League (CFL).
