= 2024 New York Jets season =

65th season in franchise history

- Owner: Woody and Christopher Johnson
- General manager: Joe Douglas (fired on November 19, 3–8 record); Phil Savage (interim, 2–4 record)
- Head coach: Robert Saleh (fired October 8, 2–3 record); Jeff Ulbrich (interim, 3–9 record)
- Home stadium: MetLife Stadium

Results
- Record: 5–12
- Division place: 3rd AFC East
- Playoffs: Did not qualify
- Pro Bowlers: DT Quinnen Williams

Uniform
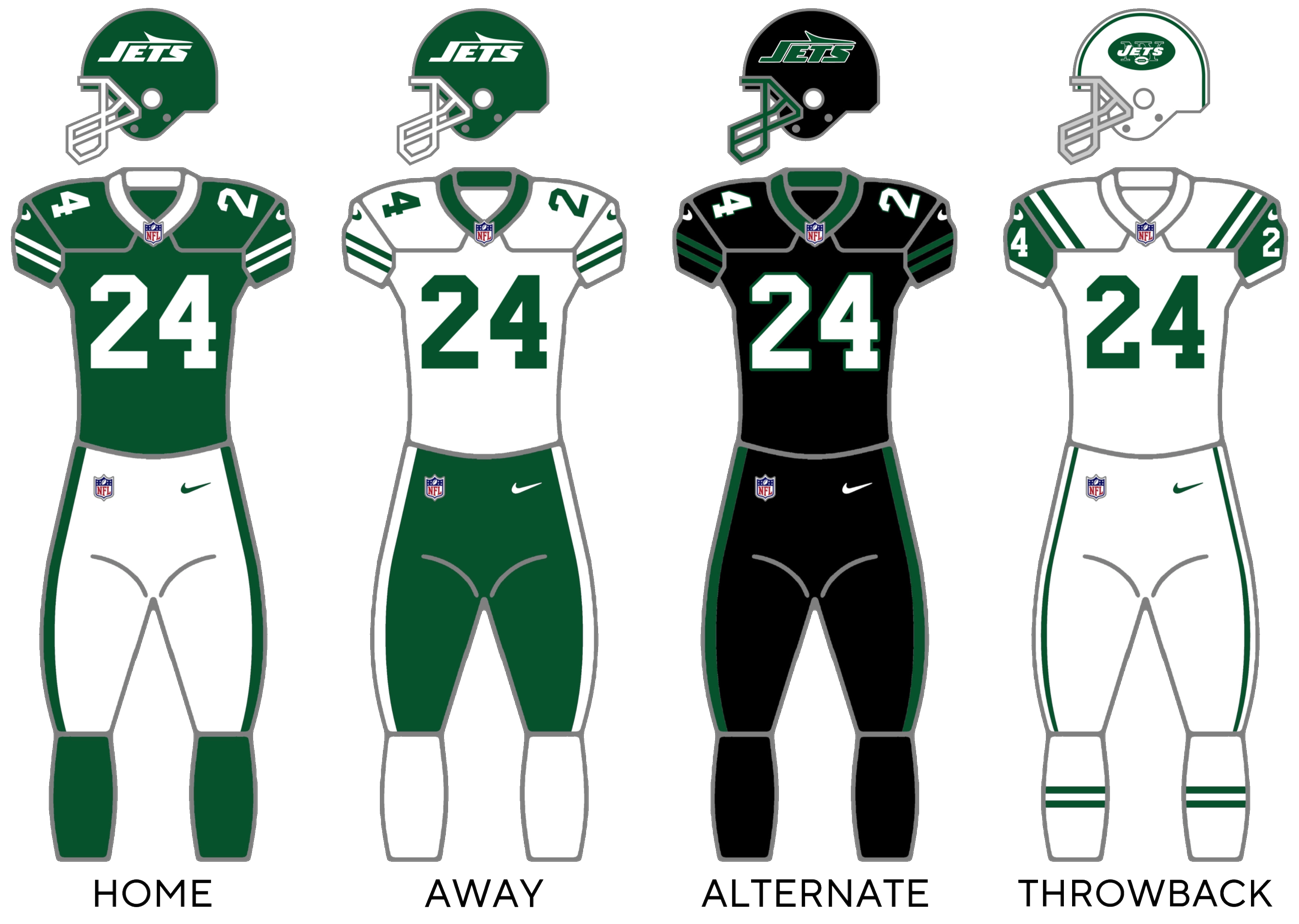

The 2024 season was the New York Jets' 55th in the National Football League (NFL), their 65th overall, their sixth and final under general manager Joe Douglas and their fourth and final under head coach Robert Saleh. On October 8, following a week 5 loss to the Minnesota Vikings in London, the Jets fired Saleh and promoted defensive coordinator Jeff Ulbrich to be the interim head coach. General Manager Joe Douglas was also fired on November 19 after a week 11 loss to the Indianapolis Colts dropped the Jets to 3–8 and was replaced by Phil Savage.

This was the Jets' second season after acquiring four-time MVP quarterback Aaron Rodgers from the Green Bay Packers. Following a season-ending Achilles injury to Rodgers in week 1 of the 2023 season, the Jets tried to improve on their 7–10 record from 2022 and 2023, return to the playoffs for the first time since 2010, and end the longest active playoff drought in American professional sports, but failed to do either of those after an overtime loss to the Miami Dolphins in week 14. The Jets missed the playoffs for the 14th straight year and the 16th time in the last 18 seasons. Despite the return of Rodgers and the addition of several key offensive players such as Mike Williams and Davante Adams, the Jets had their worst start since 2021, beginning the year 2–6. The Jets started with a 2–1 record, but suffered a brutal five-game losing streak that dropped their record to 2–6 on the season. A week 13 loss to the Seattle Seahawks ensured the Jets' ninth consecutive losing season, continuing the longest active streak in the league. It was also the franchise's fifth consecutive season with ten or more losses. After a week 16 loss to the Los Angeles Rams, the Jets failed to match their 7–10 record from the previous two seasons, and suffered their worst record since 2021, and also the most losses for Aaron Rodgers in a single season as a starter. In addition, none of the team's players were named to the initial Pro Bowl roster for the first time since 2021.

== Trades ==
Trades below only are for trades that included a player. Draft pick-only trades will go in draft section.

Date	Player(s)/Asset(s) received	Team	Player(s)/Asset(s) traded
April 1	LB Haason Reddick	Philadelphia Eagles	2026 conditional 2nd or 3rd round selection (Note: Had Reddick reached 67.5% of playing time and gotten 10 sacks in 2024 or Reddick was traded to an NFC team, the Eagles would have acquired the Jets' 2026 2nd round selection. Neither were met since Reddick only had one sack and only played in 57% of the Jets' snaps in 2024, so the Eagles get the Jets' 3rd round selection instead.)
October 16	WR Davante Adams	Las Vegas Raiders	2025 conditional 2nd or 3rd round selection (Note: Had Adams been a first or second team All-Pro in 2024 or on Jets active roster for AFC championship game or Super Bowl LIX, the Raiders receive the Jets' 2025 2nd round selection instead. The Jets ultimately missed the playoffs in 2024, and Adams wasn't named to the 2024 All-Pro team, therefore, the Raiders received the Jets third that was previously acquired from Detroit (92nd overall))
November 5	2025 5th round selection	Pittsburgh Steelers	Mike Williams

== Draft ==
2024 New York Jets draft selections
Round	Selection	Player	Position	College	Notes
1	10	Traded to the Minnesota Vikings (Note: The Jets traded their first- and sixth-round selections (10th and 203rd) to the Minnesota Vikings in exchange for first-, fourth- and fifth-round selections (11th, 129th and 157th).)			
1	11	Olu Fashanu	OT	Penn State	From Vikings
2	41	Traded to the Green Bay Packers (Note: The Jets traded a second-round selection (41st overall), 2023 first-, second- and sixth-round selections (13th, 42nd and 207th) to the Green Bay Packers in exchange for 2023 first and fifth-round selections (15th and 170th), and QB Aaron Rodgers.)			
3	65	Malachi Corley	WR	Western Kentucky	From Panthers (Note: The Jets traded third- and fifth-round selections (72nd and 157th overall) to the Carolina Panthers in exchange for a third-round selection (65th).)
3	72	Traded to the Carolina Panthers			
4	111	Traded to the Green Bay Packers (Note: The Jets traded a fourth-round selection (111th overall) to the Green Bay Packers in exchange for fourth- and sixth-round selections (126th and 190th overall).)			
4	113	Traded to the Baltimore Ravens (Note: The Jets traded fourth- and sixth-round selections (113th and 218th overall) to the Baltimore Ravens in exchange for a fourth-round selection (134th overall) and OT Morgan Moses.)			From Broncos (Note: The Jets traded a fifth-round selection (145th overall) and DE Jacob Martin to the Denver Broncos in exchange for a fourth-round selection (113th overall).)
4	126	Traded to the Detroit Lions (Note: The Jets traded a fourth-round selection (126th overall) to the Detroit Lions in exchange for a 2025 third-round selection.)			From Packers
4	129	Traded to the San Francisco 49ers (Note: The Jets traded a fourth-round selection (129th overall) to the San Francisco 49ers in exchange for two fifth-round selections (173rd and 176th overall).)			From Vikings
4	134	Braelon Allen	RB	Wisconsin	From Ravens
5	145	Traded to the Denver Broncos			
5	157	Traded to the Carolina Panthers			From Vikings
5	171	Jordan Travis	QB	Florida State	Compensatory pick; from Eagles (Note: The Jets traded two sixth-round selections (185th and 190th overall) to the Philadelphia Eagles in exchange for a fifth-round selection (171st overall).)
5	173	Isaiah Davis	RB	South Dakota State	Compensatory pick; from 49ers
5	176	Qwan'tez Stiggers	CB	Toronto Argonauts	Compensatory pick; from 49ers
6	185	Traded to the Philadelphia Eagles			
6	190	Traded to the Philadelphia Eagles			From Packers
6	203	Traded to the Minnesota Vikings			From Broncos (Note: The Jets traded a seventh-round selection and QB Zach Wilson to the Denver Broncos in exchange for a sixth-round selection (203rd overall).)
6	218	Traded to the Baltimore Ravens			Compensatory pick
7	228	Traded to the Baltimore Ravens (Note: The Jets traded a seventh-round selection to the Baltimore Ravens in exchange for S Chuck Clark.)			
7	256	Traded to the Denver Broncos			Compensatory pick
7	257	Jaylen Key	S	Alabama	Compensatory pick

2024 New York Jets undrafted free agents
Name	Position	College	Ref.
Shemar Bartholomew	CB	Georgia Southern	
Al Blades Jr.	S	Duke	
Jimmy Ciarlo	LB	Army	
Tyler Harrell	WR	Miami (FL)	
Tre Jenkins	LB	San José State	
Tyreek Johnson	DE	South Carolina	
Myles Jones	CB	Duke	
Brady Latham	G	Arkansas	
Braiden McGregor	DE	Michigan	
Jarius Monroe	S	Tulane	
Marcus Riley	WR	Florida A&M	
Lincoln Sefcik	TE	South Alabama	
Jackson Sirmon	LB	California	
Leonard Taylor III	DT	Miami (FL)	
Willie Tyler	OT	Louisville	
Eric Watts	DE	UConn	
Ben Bryant	QB	Northwestern	

Draft trades

== Staff ==
2024 New York Jets staff
Front office: Owner/chairman/CEO – Woody Johnson; Vice chairman – Christopher Johnson; President – Hymie Elhai; Executive vice president/COO – Brian Friedman; General manager – Joe Douglas (fired on November 19); Interim general manager – Phil Savage; Senior director of football strategy – David Socie; Senior director of football operations – Dan Zbojovsky; Senior director of football administration – Nick Sabella; Co-Director of player personnel – Jon Carr; Co-Director of player personnel – Greg Nejmeh; Co-Assistant director of pro personnel – Kevin Murphy; Co-Assistant director of pro personnel – Evan Ardoin; Director of college scouting – Jay Mandolesi; Director, football analytics – Brian Shields; Head coaches: Head coach – Robert Saleh (fired on October 8); Interim head coach – Jeff Ulbrich; Offensive coaches: Offensive coordinator – Nathaniel Hackett; Passing game coordinator – Todd Downing; Running backs – Tony Dews; Wide receivers – Shawn Jefferson; Tight ends – Ron Middleton; Offensive line/run game coordinator – Keith Carter; Assistant offensive line – Ben Wilkerson; Offensive assistant – Walter Kusmirek; Offensive assistant/fellowship – Junior Taylor; Offensive assistant – Billy VandeMerkt	Defensive coaches: Interim defensive coordinator/defensive backs/safeties – Marquand Manuel; Defensive line – Aaron Whitecotton; Linebackers – Mike Rutenberg; Assistant linebackers – Shaq Wilson; Senior defensive assistant/cornerbacks – Tony Oden; Defensive backs/nickelbacks – Nathaniel Willingham; Defensive assistant – Ryan Davis Sr; Special teams coaches: Special teams coordinator – Brant Boyer; Special teams assistant/game management coordinator – Dan Shamash; Strength and conditioning: Head strength and conditioning – Mike Nicolini; Assistant strength and conditioning – Joe Giacobbe; Assistant strength and conditioning – Aaron McLaurin

== Final roster ==
2024 New York Jets roster
Quarterbacks (QB): 8 Aaron Rodgers; 2 Tyrod Taylor; Running backs (RB): 0 Braelon Allen; 32 Isaiah Davis; 20 Breece Hall; Wide receivers (WR): 17 Davante Adams; 14 Malachi Corley; 82 Xavier Gipson; 10 Allen Lazard; 5 Garrett Wilson; Tight ends (TE): 83 Tyler Conklin; 89 Jeremy Ruckert; 88 Kenny Yeboah	Offensive linemen (OL): 62 Jake Hanson RG; 61 Max Mitchell RT; 78 Morgan Moses RT; 65 Xavier Newman-Johnson C; 71 Wes Schweitzer G; 76 John Simpson LG; 66 Joe Tippmann C; 75 Alijah Vera-Tucker RG; 67 Carter Warren LT; Defensive linemen (DL): 72 Micheal Clemons DE; 98 Bruce Hector DT; 54 Javon Kinlaw DT; 51 Phidarian Mathis DT; 99 Will McDonald IV DE; 91 Braiden McGregor DE; 96 Leonard Taylor III DT; 94 Solomon Thomas DT; 58 Eric Watts DE; 95 Quinnen Williams DT	Linebackers (LB): 50 Jamin Davis OLB; 52 Sam Eguavoen MLB; 41 Marcelino McCrary-Ball MLB; 7 Haason Reddick OLB; 44 Jamien Sherwood OLB; 55 Chazz Surratt MLB; 56 Quincy Williams OLB; Defensive backs (DB): 22 Tony Adams FS; 29 Jarrick Bernard-Converse CB; 30 Michael Carter II CB; 21 Ashtyn Davis SS; 26 Brandin Echols CB; 39 Jarius Monroe SS; 23 Isaiah Oliver CB; 4 D. J. Reed CB; 27 Kendall Sheffield CB; 25 Jaylin Simpson S; 37 Qwan'tez Stiggers CB; Special teams (ST): 42 Thomas Hennessy LS; 40 Greg Joseph K; 6 Thomas Morstead P	Practice squad: 97 Bradlee Anae DE; 69 Zack Bailey G; 16 Jason Brownlee WR; 79 Matthew Cindric C; 93 Kameron Cline DE; 38 Zach Evans RB; 68 Obinna Eze LT (IPP); 33 Zonovan Knight RB; 81 Zack Kuntz TE; 64 Kohl Levao C; 15 Adrian Martinez QB; 70 David Sharpe RT; 49 Jackson Sirmon MLB; 87 Brandon Smith WR; 31 Tre Swilling CB; 85 Easop Winston WR; Reserve: 53 Zaire Barnes OLB (IR); 19 Irvin Charles WR (IR); 45 Jimmy Ciarlo OLB (IR); 36 Chuck Clark SS (IR); 74 Olu Fashanu LT (IR); 92 Leki Fotu DT (IR); 1 Sauce Gardner CB (IR); 11 Jermaine Johnson II OLB (IR); 35 Jalen Mills FS (IR); 57 C. J. Mosley MLB (IR); 34 Kene Nwangwu RB (IR); 87 Marcus Riley WR (IR); 77 Tyron Smith LT (IR); 86 Malik Taylor WR (IR); 3 Jordan Travis QB (NF-Inj.); 9 Greg Zuerlein K (IR); Rookies in italics 53 active, 16 reserve, 15 practice squad (1 exempt)

== Preseason ==
Week	Date	Opponent	Result	Record	Venue	Recap
1	August 10	Washington Commanders	W 20–17	1–0	MetLife Stadium	Recap
2	August 17	at Carolina Panthers	W 15–12	2–0	Bank of America Stadium	Recap
3	August 24	New York Giants	W 10–6	3–0	MetLife Stadium	Recap

== Regular season ==
=== Schedule ===
Week	Date	Opponent	Result	Record	Venue	Recap
1	September 9	at San Francisco 49ers	**L** 19–32	0–1	Levi's Stadium	Recap
2	September 15	at Tennessee Titans	**W** 24–17	1–1	Nissan Stadium	Recap
3	September 19	**New England Patriots**	**W** 24–3	2–1	MetLife Stadium	Recap
4	September 29	Denver Broncos	**L** 9–10	2–2	MetLife Stadium	Recap
5	October 6	at Minnesota Vikings	**L** 17–23	2–3	(United Kingdom) Tottenham Hotspur Stadium (London)	Recap
6	October 14	**Buffalo Bills**	**L** 20–23	2–4	MetLife Stadium	Recap
7	October 20	at Pittsburgh Steelers	**L** 15–37	2–5	Acrisure Stadium	Recap
8	October 27	at **New England Patriots**	**L** 22–25	2–6	Gillette Stadium	Recap
9	October 31	Houston Texans	**W** 21–13	3–6	MetLife Stadium	Recap
10	November 10	at Arizona Cardinals	**L** 6–31	3–7	State Farm Stadium	Recap
11	November 17	Indianapolis Colts	**L** 27–28	3–8	MetLife Stadium	Recap
12	Bye					
13	December 1	Seattle Seahawks	**L** 21–26	3–9	MetLife Stadium	Recap
14	December 8	at **Miami Dolphins**	**L** 26–32 (OT)	3–10	Hard Rock Stadium	Recap
15	December 15	at Jacksonville Jaguars	**W** 32–25	4–10	EverBank Stadium	Recap
16	December 22	Los Angeles Rams	**L** 9–19	4–11	MetLife Stadium	Recap
17	December 29	at **Buffalo Bills**	**L** 14–40	4–12	Highmark Stadium	Recap
18	January 5	**Miami Dolphins**	**W** 32–20	5–12	MetLife Stadium	Recap

Note: Intra-division opponents are in bold text.

=== Game summaries ===
==== Week 1: at San Francisco 49ers ====
Week 1: New York Jets at San Francisco 49ers – game summary

Quarter	1	2	3	4	Total
Jets	7	0	6	6	**19**
**49ers**	3	13	10	6	**32**

at Levi's Stadium, Santa Clara, California

- Date: September 9
- Game time: 8:15 p.m. EDT/5:15 p.m. PDT
- Game weather: Sunny, 76 °F (24 °C)
- Game attendance: 71,319
- Referee: Carl Cheffers
- TV announcers (ESPN/ABC): Joe Buck, Troy Aikman, Lisa Salters, and Laura Rutledge
- Recap, Game Book

Game information

**First quarter**

- SF – Jake Moody 46-yard field goal, 10:58. 49ers 3–0. **Drive: 4 plays, 3 yards, 0:49.**
- NYJ – Breece Hall 3-yard run (Greg Zuerlein kick), 3:51. Jets 7–3. **Drive: 12 plays, 70 yards, 7:07.**

**Second quarter**

- SF – Jake Moody 51-yard field goal, 14:04. Jets 7–6. **Drive: 9 plays, 37 yards, 4:47.**
- SF – Deebo Samuel 2-yard run (Jake Moody kick), 6:54. 49ers 13–7. **Drive: 12 plays, 67 yards, 5:49.**
- SF – Jake Moody 31-yard field goal, 0:04. 49ers 16–7. **Drive: 12 plays, 75 yards, 5:14.**

**Third quarter**

- SF – Jordan Mason 5-yard run (Jake Moody kick), 7:24. 49ers 23–7. **Drive: 11 plays, 70 yards, 7:18.**
- SF – Jake Moody 53-yard field goal, 3:28. 49ers 26–7. **Drive: 8 plays, 26 yards, 2:43.**
- NYJ – Allen Lazard 36-yard pass from Aaron Rodgers (run failed), 1:39. 49ers 26–13. **Drive: 5 plays, 70 yards, 1:49.**

**Fourth quarter**

- SF – Jake Moody 23-yard field goal, 9:43. 49ers 29–13. **Drive: 11 plays, 75 yards, 6:56.**
- SF – Jake Moody 42-yard field goal, 4:20. 49ers 32–13. **Drive: 5 plays, 26 yards, 3:02.**
- NYJ – Allen Lazard 3-yard pass from Tyrod Taylor (pass failed), 0:25. 49ers 32–19. **Drive: 12 plays, 70 yards, 3:55.**

**Top passers**

- NYJ – Aaron Rodgers – 13/21, 167 yards, TD, INT
- SF – Brock Purdy – 19/29, 231 yards

**Top rushers**

- NYJ – Breece Hall – 16 rushes, 54 yards, TD
- SF – Jordan Mason – 28 rushes, 147 yards, TD

**Top receivers**

- NYJ – Allen Lazard – 6 receptions, 89 yards, 2 TD
- SF – Jauan Jennings – 5 receptions, 64 yards

Aaron Rodgers's return did not end well as the 49ers rushing attack overwhelmed the Jets defense despite missing reigning Offensive Player of the Year Christian McCaffrey.

==== Week 2: at Tennessee Titans ====
Week 2: New York Jets at Tennessee Titans – game summary

Quarter	1	2	3	4	Total
**Jets**	0	7	10	7	**24**
Titans	7	3	7	0	**17**

at Nissan Stadium, Nashville, Tennessee

- Date: September 15
- Game time: 1:00 p.m. EDT/12:00 p.m. CDT
- Game weather: Cloudy, 80 °F (27 °C)
- Game attendance: 65,509
- Referee: Alan Eck
- TV announcers (CBS): Ian Eagle, Charles Davis and Evan Washburn
- Recap, Game Book

Game information

**First quarter**

- TEN – Calvin Ridley 10-yard run (Nick Folk kick), 2:30. Titans 7–0. **Drive: 9 plays, 68 yards, 6:38.**

**Second quarter**

- NYJ – Braelon Allen 12-yard pass from Aaron Rodgers (Greg Zuerlein kick), 1:47. Tied 7–7. **Drive: 12 plays, 73 yards, 5:05.**
- TEN – Nick Folk 41-yard field goal, 0:00. Titans 10–7. **Drive: 8 plays, 51 yards, 1:47.**

**Third quarter**

- NYJ – Breece Hall 26-yard pass from Aaron Rodgers (Greg Zuerlein kick), 12:08. Jets 14–10. **Drive: 5 plays, 70 yards, 2:52.**
- NYJ – Greg Zuerlein 33-yard field goal, 5:58. Jets 17–10. **Drive: 6 plays, 15 yards, 2:17.**
- TEN – Calvin Ridley 40-yard pass from Will Levis (Nick Folk kick), 3:22. Tied 17–17. **Drive: 5 plays, 71 yards, 2:36.**

**Fourth quarter**

- NYJ – Braelon Allen 20-yard run (Greg Zuerlein kick), 4:31. Jets 24–17. **Drive: 7 plays, 74 yards, 4:10.**

**Top passers**

- NYJ – Aaron Rodgers – 18/30, 176 yards, 2 TD
- TEN – Will Levis – 19/28, 192 yards, TD, INT

**Top rushers**

- NYJ – Breece Hall – 14 rushes, 62 yards
- TEN – Tony Pollard – 17 rushes, 62 yards

**Top receivers**

- NYJ – Garrett Wilson – 4 receptions, 57 yards
- TEN – Calvin Ridley – 4 receptions, 77 yards, TD

Jets rookie RB Braelon Allen tied the record for becoming the youngest player to score a touchdown from scrimmage, at age 20 years, 239 days, as he scored the game winning touchdown against the Titans. Unfortunately, Pro Bowl DE Jermaine Johnson tore his Achilles and would miss the rest of the season.

==== Week 3: vs. New England Patriots ====
Week 3: New England Patriots at New York Jets – game summary

Quarter	1	2	3	4	Total
Patriots	0	3	0	0	**3**
**Jets**	7	7	7	3	**24**

at MetLife Stadium, East Rutherford, New Jersey

- Date: September 19
- Game time: 8:15 p.m. EDT
- Game weather: Cloudy, 75 °F (24 °C)
- Game attendance: 80,812
- Referee: John Hussey
- TV announcers (WFXT, WNYW, Prime Video): Al Michaels, Kirk Herbstreit, and Kaylee Hartung
  Game exclusive to WFXT and WNYW through syndication. Out of market on Prime Video.
- Recap, Game Book

Game information

**First quarter**

- NYJ – Allen Lazard 10-yard pass from Aaron Rodgers (Greg Zuerlein kick), 4:21. Jets 7–0. **Drive: 8 plays, 73 yards, 4:13.**

**Second quarter**

- NYJ – Breece Hall 1-yard run (Greg Zuerlein kick), 8:32. Jets 14–0. **Drive: 13 plays, 91 yards, 7:47.**
- NE – Joey Slye 44-yard field goal, 3:56. Jets 14–3. **Drive: 8 plays, 50 yards, 4:36.**

**Third quarter**

- NYJ – Garrett Wilson 2-yard pass from Aaron Rodgers (Greg Zuerlein kick), 6:18. Jets 21–3. **Drive: 11 plays, 66 yards, 7:10.**

**Fourth quarter**

- NYJ – Greg Zuerlein 28-yard field goal, 10:16. Jets 24–3. **Drive: 7 plays, 28 yards, 3:46.**

**Top passers**

- NE – Jacoby Brissett – 12/18, 98 yards
- NYJ – Aaron Rodgers – 27/35, 281 yards, 2 TD

**Top rushers**

- NE – Antonio Gibson – 5 rushes, 29 yards
- NYJ – Braelon Allen – 11 rushes, 55 yards

**Top receivers**

- NE – Demario Douglas – 7 receptions, 69 yards
- NYJ – Tyler Conklin – 5 receptions, 93 yards

The Jets handled business against the Patriots for their first home win over New England since 2015.

==== Week 4: vs. Denver Broncos ====
Week 4: Denver Broncos at New York Jets – game summary

Quarter	1	2	3	4	Total
**Broncos**	0	0	7	3	**10**
Jets	0	6	0	3	**9**

at MetLife Stadium, East Rutherford, New Jersey

- Date: September 29
- Game time: 1:00 p.m. EDT
- Game weather: Rain, 67 °F (19 °C)
- Game attendance: 82,243
- Referee: Ronald Torbert
- TV announcers (CBS): Ian Eagle, Charles Davis and Evan Washburn
- Recap, Game Book

Game information

**First quarter**

- No scoring plays.

**Second quarter**

- NYJ – Greg Zuerlein 23-yard field goal, 14:51. Jets 3–0. **Drive: 6 plays, 29 yards, 2:16.**
- NYJ – Greg Zuerlein 35-yard field goal, 0:00. Jets 6–0. **Drive: 9 plays, 56 yards, 1:47.**

**Third quarter**

- DEN – Courtland Sutton 8-yard pass from Bo Nix (Wil Lutz kick), 3:08. Broncos 7–6. **Drive: 11 plays, 87 yards, 5:27.**

**Fourth quarter**

- NYJ – Greg Zuerlein 40-yard field goal, 13:34. Jets 9–7. **Drive: 11 plays, 53 yards, 4:34.**
- DEN – Wil Lutz 47-yard field goal, 8:55. Broncos 10–9. **Drive: 8 plays, 41 yards, 4:39.**

**Top passers**

- DEN – Bo Nix – 12/25, 60 yards, TD
- NYJ – Aaron Rodgers – 24/42, 225 yards

**Top rushers**

- DEN – Javonte Williams – 16 rushes, 77 yards
- NYJ – Braelon Allen – 8 rushes, 34 yards

**Top receivers**

- DEN – Courtland Sutton – 3 receptions, 60 yards, TD
- NYJ – Mike Williams – 4 receptions, 67 yards

The Jets offense struggled in the rain as Greg Zuerlein missed a game winning 48 yard attempt.

==== Week 5: at Minnesota Vikings ====
NFL London games

Week 5: New York Jets at Minnesota Vikings – game summary

Quarter	1	2	3	4	Total
Jets	0	7	3	7	**17**
**Vikings**	10	7	0	6	**23**

at Tottenham Hotspur Stadium, London, England

- Date: October 6
- Game time: 2:30 p.m. BST/9:30 a.m. EDT
- Game weather: Cloudy, 59 °F (15 °C)
- Game attendance: 61,139
- Referee: Scott Novak
- TV announcers (WCBS, KARE, NFLN): Rich Eisen, Kurt Warner, Jamie Erdahl and Stacey Dales
  Game exclusive to WCBS and KARE through syndication. Out of market on NFLN.
- Recap, Game Book

Game information

**First quarter**

- MIN – Will Reichard 54-yard field goal, 7:41. Vikings 3–0. **Drive: 11 plays, 52 yards, 5:46.**
- MIN – Andrew Van Ginkel 63-yard interception return (Will Reichard kick), 2:18. Vikings 10–0.

**Second quarter**

- MIN – C. J. Ham 2-yard run (Will Reichard kick), 3:58. Vikings 17–0. **Drive: 8 plays, 74 yards, 4:48.**
- NYJ – Allen Lazard 14-yard pass from Aaron Rodgers (Greg Zuerlein kick), 0:36. Vikings 17–7. **Drive: 5 plays, 31 yards, 0:46.**

**Third quarter**

- NYJ – Greg Zuerlein 32-yard field goal, 0:50. Vikings 17–10. **Drive: 17 plays, 83 yards, 6:51.**

**Fourth quarter**

- MIN – Will Reichard 53-yard field goal, 12:07. Vikings 20–10. **Drive: 4 plays, 2 yards, 0:56.**
- NYJ – Garrett Wilson 1-yard pass from Aaron Rodgers (Greg Zuerlein kick), 6:04. Vikings 20–17. **Drive: 8 plays, 42 yards, 3:43.**
- MIN – Will Reichard 41-yard field goal, 3:07. Vikings 23–17. **Drive: 9 plays, 47 yards, 2:57.**

**Top passers**

- NYJ – Aaron Rodgers – 29/54, 244 yards, 2 TD, 3 INT
- MIN – Sam Darnold – 14/31, 179 yards, INT

**Top rushers**

- NYJ – Breece Hall – 9 rushes, 23 yards
- MIN – Ty Chandler – 14 rushes, 30 yards

**Top receivers**

- NYJ – Garrett Wilson – 13 receptions, 101 yards, TD
- MIN – Justin Jefferson – 6 receptions, 92 yards

Following the team's loss to the Vikings, head coach Robert Saleh was relieved of his duties.

==== Week 6: vs. Buffalo Bills ====
Week 6: Buffalo Bills at New York Jets – game summary

Quarter	1	2	3	4	Total
**Bills**	7	13	0	3	**23**
Jets	10	7	3	0	**20**

at MetLife Stadium, East Rutherford, New Jersey

- Date: October 14
- Game time: 8:15 p.m. EDT
- Game weather: Clear, 49 °F (9 °C)
- Game attendance: 81,118
- Referee: Adrian Hill
- TV announcers (ESPN/ABC): Joe Buck, Troy Aikman and Laura Rutledge
- Recap, Game Book

Game information

**First quarter**

- NYJ – Greg Zuerlein 34-yard field goal, 11:06. Jets 3–0. **Drive: 8 plays, 54 yards, 3:54.**
- BUF – Josh Allen 1-yard run (Tyler Bass kick), 6:12. Bills 7–3. **Drive: 9 plays, 70 yards, 4:54.**
- NYJ – Garrett Wilson 5-yard pass from Aaron Rodgers (Greg Zuerlein kick), 2:06. Jets 10–7. **Drive: 9 plays, 70 yards, 4:11.**

**Second quarter**

- BUF – Mack Hollins 8-yard pass from Josh Allen (kick failed, wide left), 6:54. Bills 13–10. **Drive: 10 plays, 90 yards, 5:12.**
- BUF – Dawson Knox 12-yard pass from Josh Allen (Tyler Bass kick), 0:21. Bills 20–10. **Drive: 10 plays, 80 yards, 2:28.**
- NYJ – Allen Lazard 52-yard pass from Aaron Rodgers (Greg Zuerlein kick), 0:00. Bills 20–17. **Drive: 3 plays, 70 yards, 0:21.**

**Third quarter**

- NYJ – Greg Zuerlein 22-yard field goal, 6:13. Tied 20–20. **Drive: 10 plays, 60 yards, 4:53.**

**Fourth quarter**

- BUF – Tyler Bass 22-yard field goal, 3:43. Bills 23–20. **Drive: 11 plays, 64 yards, 6:01.**

**Top passers**

- BUF – Josh Allen – 19/25, 215 yards, 2 TD
- NYJ – Aaron Rodgers – 23/35, 294 yards, 2 TD, INT

**Top rushers**

- BUF – Ray Davis – 20 rushes, 97 yards
- NYJ – Breece Hall – 18 rushes, 113 yards

**Top receivers**

- BUF – Ray Davis – 3 receptions, 55 yards
- NYJ – Allen Lazard – 6 receptions, 114 yards, TD

Despite Aaron Rodgers throwing for a 52-yard hail mary at the end of the first half against the Bills to cut the deficit to 20–17, the Jets could not complete the comeback and lost to the Bills.

==== Week 7: at Pittsburgh Steelers ====
Week 7: New York Jets at Pittsburgh Steelers – game summary

Quarter	1	2	3	4	Total
Jets	7	8	0	0	**15**
**Steelers**	3	10	10	14	**37**

at Acrisure Stadium, Pittsburgh, Pennsylvania

- Date: October 20
- Game time: 8:20 p.m. EDT
- Game weather: Clear, 60 °F (16 °C)
- Game attendance: 66,956
- Referee: Shawn Smith
- TV announcers (NBC): Mike Tirico, Cris Collinsworth and Melissa Stark
- Recap, Game Book

Game information

**First quarter**

- PIT – Chris Boswell 46-yard field goal, 11:33. Steelers 3–0. **Drive: 7 plays, 42 yards, 3:27.**
- NYJ – Breece Hall 13-yard run (Greg Zuerlein kick), 2:27. Jets 7–3. **Drive: 9 plays, 82 yards, 5:41.**

**Second quarter**

- PIT – Chris Boswell 29-yard field goal, 8:20. Jets 7–6. **Drive: 9 plays, 58 yards, 4:25.**
- NYJ – Tyler Conklin 1-yard pass from Aaron Rodgers (Aaron Rodgers–Garrett Wilson pass), 5:29. Jets 15–6. **Drive: 6 plays, 72 yards, 2:51.**
- PIT – George Pickens 11-yard pass from Russell Wilson (Chris Boswell kick), 0:27. Jets 15–13. **Drive: 4 plays, 54 yards, 0:48.**

**Third quarter**

- PIT – Chris Boswell 21-yard field goal, 7:49. Steelers 16–15. **Drive: 11 plays, 76 yards, 4:52.**
- PIT – Russell Wilson 1-yard run (Chris Boswell kick), 7:15. Steelers 23–15. **Drive: 1 play, 1 yard, 0:07.**

**Fourth quarter**

- PIT – Van Jefferson 4-yard pass from Russell Wilson (Chris Boswell kick), 12:09. Steelers 30–15. **Drive: 11 plays, 75 yards, 5:28.**
- PIT – Najee Harris 10-yard run (Chris Boswell kick), 0:26. Steelers 37–15. **Drive: 13 plays, 75 yards, 7:27.**

**Top passers**

- NYJ – Aaron Rodgers – 24/39, 276 yards, TD, 2 INT
- PIT – Russell Wilson – 16/29, 264 yards, 2 TD

**Top rushers**

- NYJ – Breece Hall – 12 rushes, 38 yards, TD
- PIT – Najee Harris – 21 rushes, 102 yards, TD

**Top receivers**

- NYJ – Breece Hall – 6 receptions, 103 yards
- PIT – George Pickens – 5 receptions, 111 yards, TD

Facing the Steelers and Russell Wilson in his first start for the team, he embarrassed the Jets throwing for 264 yards and 2 touchdowns as the Jets failed to score in the 2nd half. This was the first game for newcomer Davante Adams as he was traded to the Jets from the Las Vegas Raiders on Tuesday after their loss to the Bills.

==== Week 8: at New England Patriots ====
Week 8: New York Jets at New England Patriots – game summary

Quarter	1	2	3	4	Total
Jets	6	7	3	6	**22**
**Patriots**	7	0	7	11	**25**

at Gillette Stadium, Foxborough, Massachusetts

- Date: October 27
- Game time: 1:00 p.m. EDT
- Game weather: Sunny, 53 °F (12 °C)
- Game attendance: 64,628
- Referee: Craig Wrolstad
- TV announcers (CBS): Spero Dedes, Adam Archuleta, and Aditi Kinkhabwala
- Recap, Game Book

Game information

**First quarter**

- NE – Drake Maye 17-yard run (Joey Slye kick), 5:18. Patriots 7–0. **Drive: 10 plays, 77 yards, 6:28.**
- NYJ – Tyler Conklin 2-yard pass from Aaron Rodgers (kick failed, wide left), 1:23. Patriots 7–6. **Drive: 7 plays, 70 yards, 3:55.**

**Second quarter**

- NYJ – Xavier Gipson 1-yard pass from Aaron Rodgers (Greg Zuerlein kick), 9:06. Jets 13–7. **Drive: 8 plays, 60 yards, 4:39.**

**Third quarter**

- NE – Rhamondre Stevenson 3-yard run (Joey Slye kick), 10:55. Patriots 14–13. **Drive: 5 plays, 26 yards, 2:15.**
- NYJ – Greg Zuerlein 29-yard field goal, 7:54. Jets 16–14. **Drive: 7 plays, 59 yards, 3:01.**

**Fourth quarter**

- NE – Joey Slye 23-yard field goal, 7:34. Patriots 17–16. **Drive: 14 plays, 61 yards, 5:05.**
- NYJ – Braelon Allen 2-yard run (pass failed), 2:57. Jets 22–17. **Drive: 10 plays, 70 yards, 4:37.**
- NE – Rhamondre Stevenson 1-yard run (Jacoby Brissett–Rhamondre Stevenson pass), 0:25. Patriots 25–22. **Drive: 12 plays, 70 yards, 2:35.**

**Top passers**

- NYJ – Aaron Rodgers – 17/28, 233 yards, TD
- NE – Jacoby Brissett – 15/24, 132 yards

**Top rushers**

- NYJ – Breece Hall – 16 rushes, 80 yards
- NE – Rhamondre Stevenson – 20 rushes, 48 yards, 2 TD

**Top receivers**

- NYJ – Garrett Wilson – 5 receptions, 113 yards
- NE – Kayshon Boutte – 3 receptions, 46 yards

Looking for their first sweep over the Patriots since 2000, the Jets once again failed to win a game they were favored and backup QB Jacoby Brissett led a game winning drive after rookie QB Drake Maye left with a concussion. Jets kicker Greg Zuerlein continued to struggle as he missed a PAT and a field goal. In addition, the Jets became the first team in NFL history to score at least 20 points, hold an opponent under 250 total yards, and not turn the ball over once, and yet lose the game. This also marked the Jets 16th loss in their last 18 games against New England.

==== Week 9: vs. Houston Texans ====
Week 9: Houston Texans at New York Jets – game summary

Quarter	1	2	3	4	Total
Texans	0	7	3	3	**13**
**Jets**	0	0	7	14	**21**

at MetLife Stadium, East Rutherford, New Jersey

- Date: October 31
- Game time: 8:15 p.m. EDT
- Game weather: Cloudy, 71 °F (22 °C)
- Game attendance: 79,818
- Referee: Shawn Hochuli
- TV announcers (KRIV, WNYW, Prime Video): Al Michaels, Kirk Herbsreit and Kaylee Hartung
  Game exclusive to KRIV and WNYW through syndication. Out of market on Prime Video.
- Recap, Game Book

Game information

**First quarter**

- No scoring plays.

**Second quarter**

- HOU – Joe Mixon 3-yard run (Kaʻimi Fairbairn kick), 3:21. Texans 7–0. **Drive: 14 plays, 98 yards, 8:23.**

**Third quarter**

- NYJ – Garrett Wilson 21-yard pass from Aaron Rodgers (Riley Patterson kick), 9:03. Tied 7–7. **Drive: 11 plays, 70 yards, 5:57.**
- HOU – Kaʻimi Fairbairn 54-yard field goal, 4:11. Texans 10–7. **Drive: 9 plays, 20 yards, 4:52.**

**Fourth quarter**

- NYJ – Garrett Wilson 26-yard pass from Aaron Rodgers (Riley Patterson kick), 12:54. Jets 14–10. **Drive: 12 plays, 70 yards, 6:17.**
- NYJ – Davante Adams 37-yard pass from Aaron Rodgers (Riley Patterson kick), 2:56. Jets 21–10. **Drive: 8 plays, 80 yards, 3:58.**
- HOU – Kaʻimi Fairbairn 29-yard field goal, 0:39. Jets 21–13. **Drive: 15 plays, 59 yards, 2:17.**

**Top passers**

- HOU – C. J. Stroud – 11/30, 191 yards
- NYJ – Aaron Rodgers – 22/32, 211 yards, 2 TD

**Top rushers**

- HOU – Joe Mixon – 24 rushes, 106 yards, TD
- NYJ – Breece Hall – 15 rushes, 74 yards

**Top receivers**

- HOU – Tank Dell – 6 receptions, 126 yards
- NYJ – Davante Adams – 7 receptions, 91 yards, TD

Garrett Wilson made a spectacular one-handed catch and the Jets defense sacked Texans QB C. J. Stroud 8 times, ending their 5-game losing streak.

==== Week 10: at Arizona Cardinals ====
Week 10: New York Jets at Arizona Cardinals – game summary

Quarter	1	2	3	4	Total
Jets	3	3	0	0	**6**
**Cardinals**	14	10	7	0	**31**

at State Farm Stadium, Glendale, Arizona

- Date: November 10
- Game time: 4:25 p.m. EST/2:25 p.m. MST
- Game weather: Sunny, 79 °F (26 °C) (retractable roof open)
- Game attendance: 64,030
- Referee: John Hussey
- TV announcers (CBS): Spero Dedes, Adam Archuleta and Aditi Kinkhabwala
- Recap, Game Book

Game information

**First quarter**

- ARI – James Conner 1-yard run (Chad Ryland kick), 12:58. Cardinals 7–0. **Drive: 6 plays, 70 yards, 2:02.**
- NYJ – Spencer Shrader 25-yard field goal, 7:48. Cardinals 7–3. **Drive: 11 plays, 63 yards, 5:10.**
- ARI – Kyler Murray 1-yard run (Chad Ryland kick), 2:54. Cardinals 14–3. **Drive: 9 plays, 70 yards, 4:54.**

**Second quarter**

- NYJ – Spencer Shrader 45-yard field goal, 11:37. Cardinals 14–6. **Drive: 12 plays, 43 yards, 6:17.**
- ARI – Marvin Harrison Jr. 9-yard pass from Kyler Murray (Chad Ryland kick), 5:44. Cardinals 21–6. **Drive: 10 plays, 70 yards, 5:53.**
- ARI – Chad Ryland 37-yard field goal, 0:00. Cardinals 24–6. **Drive: 10 plays, 49 yards, 4:09.**

**Third quarter**

- ARI – Kyler Murray 12-yard run (Chad Ryland kick), 4:13. Cardinals 31–6. **Drive: 10 plays, 88 yards, 6:20.**

**Fourth quarter**

- No scoring plays.

**Top passers**

- NYJ – Aaron Rodgers – 22/35, 151 yards
- ARI – Kyler Murray – 22/24, 266 yards, TD

**Top rushers**

- NYJ – Breece Hall – 10 rushes, 52 yards
- ARI – Trey Benson – 10 rushes, 62 yards

**Top receivers**

- NYJ – Garrett Wilson – 5 receptions, 41 yards
- ARI – James Conner – 5 receptions, 80 yards

The Jets, looking to run the tables, had no answer for Kyler Murray as they were embarrassed once again.

==== Week 11: vs. Indianapolis Colts ====
Week 11: Indianapolis Colts at New York Jets – game summary

Quarter	1	2	3	4	Total
**Colts**	3	10	3	12	**28**
Jets	0	7	10	10	**27**

at MetLife Stadium, East Rutherford, New Jersey

- Date: November 17
- Game time: 1:00 p.m. EST
- Game weather: Cloudy, 62 °F (17 °C)
- Game attendance: 80,582
- Referee: Tra Blake
- TV announcers (CBS): Andrew Catalon, Tiki Barber, Jason McCourty and A. J. Ross
- Recap, Game Book

Game information

**First quarter**

- IND – Matt Gay 41-yard field goal, 9:07. Colts 3–0. **Drive: 9 plays, 57 yards, 4:34.**

**Second quarter**

- IND – Anthony Richardson 2-yard run (Matt Gay kick), 14:11. Colts 10–0. **Drive: 8 plays, 66 yards, 4:27.**
- IND – Matt Gay 47-yard field goal, 6:08. Colts 13–0. **Drive: 10 plays, 10 yards, 5:58.**
- NYJ – Breece Hall 29-yard pass from Aaron Rodgers (Anders Carlson kick), 0:40. Colts 13–7. **Drive: 7 plays, 76 yards, 1:37.**

**Third quarter**

- NYJ – Breece Hall 18-yard run (Anders Carlson kick), 2:55. Jets 14–13. **Drive: 2 plays, 25 yards, 0:47.**
- IND – Matt Gay 56-yard field goal, 7:41. Colts 16–14. **Drive: 11 plays, 41 yards, 5:41.**
- NYJ – Anders Carlson 58-yard field goal, 2:55. Jets 17–16. **Drive: 4 plays, -2 yards, 1:37.**

**Fourth quarter**

- NYJ – Kenny Yeboah 11-yard pass from Aaron Rodgers (Anders Carlson kick), 13:03. Jets 24–16. **Drive: 6 plays, 59 yards, 2:54.**
- IND – Josh Downs 10-yard pass from Anthony Richardson (pass failed), 10:11. Jets 24–22. **Drive: 8 plays, 70 yards, 2:52.**
- NYJ – Anders Carlson 35-yard field goal, 2:41. Jets 27–22. **Drive: 13 plays, 53 yards, 7:30.**
- IND – Anthony Richardson 4-yard run (run failed), 0:46. Colts 28–27. **Drive: 6 plays, 70 yards, 1:55.**

**Top passers**

- IND – Anthony Richardson – 20/30, 272 yards, TD
- NYJ – Aaron Rodgers – 22/29, 184 yards, 2 TD

**Top rushers**

- IND – Jonathan Taylor – 24 rushes, 57 yards
- NYJ – Breece Hall – 16 rushes, 78 yards, TD

**Top receivers**

- IND – Josh Downs – 5 receptions, 84 yards, TD
- NYJ – Davante Adams – 6 receptions, 72 yards

The Jets were in perfect position to snap the losing streak, but their defense folded at the last minute, dropping them to 3–8 heading into their bye week.

==== Week 13: vs. Seattle Seahawks ====
Week 13: Seattle Seahawks at New York Jets – game summary

Quarter	1	2	3	4	Total
**Seahawks**	0	16	0	10	**26**
Jets	14	7	0	0	**21**

at MetLife Stadium, East Rutherford, New Jersey

- Date: December 1
- Game time: 1:00 p.m. EST
- Game weather: Sunny, 37 °F (3 °C)
- Game attendance: 81,084
- Referee: Carl Cheffers
- TV announcers (Fox): Adam Amin, Mark Sanchez and Kristina Pink
- Recap, Game Book

Game information

**First quarter**

- NYJ – Davante Adams 8-yard pass from Aaron Rodgers (kick blocked), 3:25. Jets 6–0. **Drive: 11 plays, 80 yards, 6:01.**
- NYJ – Isaiah Davis 4-yard pass from Aaron Rodgers (Breece Hall run), 1:47. Jets 14–0. **Drive: 4 plays, 27 yards, 1:31.**

**Second quarter**

- SEA – AJ Barner 12-yard pass from Geno Smith (Jason Myers kick), 10:53. Jets 14–7. **Drive: 10 plays, 88 yards, 5:54.**
- NYJ – Kene Nwangwu 99-yard kickoff return (Anders Carlson kick), 10:40. Jets 21–7.
- SEA – Leonard Williams 92-yard interception return (kick blocked), 7:39. Jets 21–13.
- SEA – Jason Myers 54-yard field goal, 4:15. Jets 21–16. **Drive: 5 plays, 16 yards, 1:42.**

**Third quarter**

- No scoring plays.

**Fourth quarter**

- SEA – Jason Myers 43-yard field goal, 13:11. Jets 21–19. **Drive: 10 plays, 34 yards, 5:05.**
- SEA – Zach Charbonnet 3-yard run (Jason Myers kick), 5:34. Seahawks 26–21. **Drive: 9 plays, 71 yards, 6:03.**

**Top passers**

- SEA – Geno Smith – 20/31, 206 yards, TD
- NYJ – Aaron Rodgers – 21/39, 185 yards, 2 TD, INT

**Top rushers**

- SEA – Kenneth Walker III – 16 rushes, 49 yards
- NYJ – Breece Hall – 12 rushes, 60 yards

**Top receivers**

- SEA – Jaxon Smith-Njigba – 4 receptions, 74 yards
- NYJ – Davante Adams – 5 receptions, 66 yards, TD

With yet another chance to revive their season, the Jets offense flamed out after a pick six from former Jet Leonard Williams. Despite a great performance by their special teams, the defense couldn't stop making mistakes and fell to Seattle to clinch their 9th straight losing season.

==== Week 14: at Miami Dolphins ====
Week 14: New York Jets at Miami Dolphins – game summary

Quarter	1	2	3	4	OT	Total
Jets	3	10	10	3	0	**26**
**Dolphins**	6	9	0	11	6	**32**

at Hard Rock Stadium, Miami Gardens, Florida

- Date: December 8
- Game time: 1:00 p.m. EST
- Game weather: Partly cloudy, 77 °F (25 °C)
- Game attendance: 65,787
- Referee: Shawn Hochuli
- TV announcers (CBS): Kevin Harlan, Trent Green and Melanie Collins
- Recap, Game Book

Game information

**First quarter**

- MIA – De'Von Achane 2-yard run (kick failed, wide left), 10:24. Dolphins 6–0. **Drive: 8 plays, 70 yards, 4:36.**
- NYJ – Anders Carlson 28-yard field goal, 5:19. Dolphins 6–3. **Drive: 11 plays, 60 yards, 5:05.**

**Second quarter**

- MIA – Jason Sanders 39-yard field goal, 14:53. Dolphins 9–3. **Drive: 10 plays, 49 yards, 5:26.**
- NYJ – Isaiah Davis 17-yard run (Anders Carlson kick), 11:56. Jets 10–9. **Drive: 6 plays, 70 yards, 2:57.**
- MIA – Jason Sanders 24-yard field goal, 4:56. Dolphins 12–10. **Drive: 12 plays, 65 yards, 7:00.**
- NYJ – Anders Carlson 30-yard field goal, 0:49. Jets 13–12. **Drive: 11 plays, 58 yards, 4:07.**
- MIA – Jason Sanders 57-yard field goal, 0:02. Dolphins 15–13. **Drive: 5 plays, 31 yards, 0:47.**

**Third quarter**

- NYJ – Davante Adams 3-yard pass from Aaron Rodgers (Anders Carlson kick), 11:20. Jets 20–15. **Drive: 7 plays, 70 yards, 3:40.**
- NYJ – Anders Carlson 40-yard field goal, 1:02. Jets 23–15. **Drive: 14 plays, 58 yards, 7:49.**

**Fourth quarter**

- MIA – Tyreek Hill 4-yard pass from Tua Tagovailoa (Tua Tagovailoa–Jaylen Waddle pass), 9:04. Tied 23–23. **Drive: 9 plays, 60 yards, 4:19.**
- NYJ – Anders Carlson 42-yard field goal, 0:52. Jets 26–23. **Drive: 11 plays, 63 yards, 3:33.**
- MIA – Jason Sanders 52-yard field goal, 0:07. Tied 26–26. **Drive: 6 plays, 20 yards, 0:45.**

**Overtime**

- MIA – Jonnu Smith 10-yard pass from Tua Tagovailoa, 6:05. Dolphins 32–26. **Drive: 8 plays, 70 yards, 3:55.**

**Top passers**

- NYJ – Aaron Rodgers – 27/39, 339 yards, TD
- MIA – Tua Tagovailoa – 33/47, 331 yards, 2 TD

**Top rushers**

- NYJ – Braelon Allen – 11 rushes, 43 yards
- MIA – De'Von Achane – 14 rushes, 24 yards, TD

**Top receivers**

- NYJ – Garrett Wilson – 7 receptions, 114 yards
- MIA – Tyreek Hill – 10 receptions, 115 yards, TD

Despite Rodgers passing for 300 yards for the first time since 2021, the Jets defense couldn't stop the Dolphins' offense as they lost in overtime to the Dolphins, ensuring the Jets would not improve on their previous season's 7–10 record. Also with this loss, the Jets were eliminated them from playoff contention, extending the longest active drought in the NFL and in all 4 major sports.

==== Week 15: at Jacksonville Jaguars ====
Week 15: New York Jets at Jacksonville Jaguars – game summary

Quarter	1	2	3	4	Total
**Jets**	7	0	10	15	**32**
Jaguars	7	6	3	9	**25**

at EverBank Stadium, Jacksonville, Florida

- Date: December 15
- Game time: 1:00 p.m. EST
- Game weather: 73 °F (23 °C)
- Game attendance: 63,251
- Referee: Brad Rogers
- TV announcers (Fox): Chris Myers, Mark Schlereth and Jen Hale
- Recap, Game Book

Game information

**First quarter**

- JAX – Brian Thomas Jr. 3-yard pass from Mac Jones (Cam Little kick), 8:37. Jaguars 7–0. **Drive: 13 plays, 70 yards, 6:23.**
- NYJ – Garrett Wilson 22-yard pass from Aaron Rodgers (Anders Carlson kick), 5:01. Tied 7–7. **Drive: 7 plays, 70 yards, 3:36.**

**Second quarter**

- JAX – Cam Little 28-yard field goal, 2:41. Jaguars 10–7. **Drive: 18 plays, 77 yards, 11:07.**
- JAX – Cam Little 23-yard field goal, 0:00. Jaguars 13–7. **Drive: 11 plays, 73 yards, 1:36.**

**Third quarter**

- NYJ – Anders Carlson 23-yard field goal, 10:28. Jaguars 13–10. **Drive: 7 plays, 45 yards, 4:32.**
- JAX – Cam Little 43-yard field goal, 8:05. Jaguars 16–10. **Drive: 7 plays, 45 yards, 2:23.**
- NYJ – Davante Adams 1-yard pass from Aaron Rodgers (Anders Carlson kick), 4:33. Jets 17–16. **Drive: 7 plays, 70 yards, 3:32.**

**Fourth quarter**

- JAX – Brian Thomas Jr. 19-yard pass from Mac Jones (pass failed), 10:58. Jaguars 22–17. **Drive: 8 plays, 73 yards, 3:52.**
- NYJ – Davante Adams 71-yard pass from Aaron Rodgers (Aaron Rodgers–Davante Adams pass), 3:24. Jets 25–22. **Drive: 4 plays, 87 yards, 0:55.**
- JAX – Cam Little 43-yard field goal, 1:51. Tied 25–25. **Drive: 7 plays, 42 yards, 1:33.**
- NYJ – Breece Hall 1-yard run (Anders Carlson kick), 1:05. Jets 32–25. **Drive: 7 plays, 70 yards, 0:46.**

**Top passers**

- NYJ – Aaron Rodgers – 16/30, 289 yards, 3 TD
- JAX – Mac Jones – 31/46, 294 yards, 2 TD, 2 INT

**Top rushers**

- NYJ – Aaron Rodgers – 6 rushes, 45 yards
- JAX – Travis Etienne – 14 rushes, 65 yards

**Top receivers**

- NYJ – Davante Adams – 9 receptions, 198 yards, 2 TD
- JAX – Brian Thomas Jr. – 10 receptions, 105 yards, 2 TD

Davante Adams recorded 198 receiving yards, and the Jets were able to defeat the Jaguars to improve to 4–10.

==== Week 16: vs. Los Angeles Rams ====
Week 16: Los Angeles Rams at New York Jets – game summary

Quarter	1	2	3	4	Total
**Rams**	0	6	0	13	**19**
Jets	6	3	0	0	**9**

at MetLife Stadium, East Rutherford, New Jersey

- Date: December 22
- Game time: 1:00 p.m. EST
- Game weather: Sunny, 23 °F (−5 °C)
- Game attendance: 76,871
- Referee: Ronald Torbert
- TV announcers (CBS): Kevin Harlan, Trent Green and Melanie Collins
- Recap, Game Book

Game information

**First quarter**

- NYJ – Davante Adams 11-yard pass from Aaron Rodgers (kick failed, wide left), 0:23. Jets 6–0. **Drive: 14 plays, 99 yards, 8:22.**

**Second quarter**

- LAR – Kyren Williams 2-yard run (kick failed, hit right upright), 6:22. Tied 6–6. **Drive: 3 plays, 33 yards, 1:34.**
- NYJ – Anders Carlson 21-yard field goal, 0:00. Jets 9–6. **Drive: 15 plays, 67 yards, 6:22.**

**Third quarter**

- No scoring plays.

**Fourth quarter**

- LAR – Joshua Karty 38-yard field goal, 12:44. Tied 9–9. **Drive: 13 plays, 66 yards, 7:31.**
- LAR – Tyler Higbee 11-yard pass from Matthew Stafford (Joshua Karty kick), 10:11. Rams 16–9. **Drive: 3 plays, 21 yards, 1:32.**
- LAR – Joshua Karty 45-yard field goal, 5:17. Rams 19–9. **Drive: 6 plays, 19 yards, 3:06.**

**Top passers**

- LAR – Matthew Stafford – 14/19, 110 yards, TD, INT
- NYJ – Aaron Rodgers – 28/42, 256 yards, TD

**Top rushers**

- LAR – Kyren Williams – 23 rushes, 122 yards, TD
- NYJ – Breece Hall – 14 rushes, 52 yards

**Top receivers**

- LAR – Puka Nacua – 8 receptions, 56 yards
- NYJ – Davante Adams – 7 receptions, 68 yards, TD

The Jets never punted during the game; despite this, they were held to just 9 points, as the team failed to convert on 4th down three times during the game, Aaron Rodgers lost a fumble on a strip-sack and Anders Carlson missed a 46-yard field goal. The 11 losses during this season were the most for Aaron Rodgers in a season as a starting quarterback.

==== Week 17: at Buffalo Bills ====
Week 17: New York Jets at Buffalo Bills – game summary

Quarter	1	2	3	4	Total
Jets	0	0	0	14	**14**
**Bills**	7	5	21	7	**40**

at Highmark Stadium, Orchard Park, New York

- Date: December 29
- Game time: 1:00 p.m. EST
- Game weather: Cloudy, 54 °F (12 °C)
- Game attendance: 70,728
- Referee: Clete Blakeman
- TV announcers (CBS): Jim Nantz, Tony Romo and Tracy Wolfson
- Recap, Game Book

Game information

**First quarter**

- BUF – Josh Allen 1-yard run (Tyler Bass kick), 8:11. Bills 7–0. **Drive: 12 plays, 70 yards, 6:49.**

**Second quarter**

- BUF – Aaron Rodgers sacked in the end zone for a safety, 2:31. Bills 9–0.
- BUF – Tyler Bass 39-yard field goal, 0:00. Bills 12–0. **Drive: 9 plays, 47 yards, 2:31.**

**Third quarter**

- BUF – Amari Cooper 30-yard pass from Josh Allen (Tyler Bass kick), 5:13. Bills 19–0. **Drive: 5 plays, 38 yards, 2:07.**
- BUF – James Cook 1-yard run (Tyler Bass kick), 1:15. Bills 26–0. **Drive: 5 plays, 37 yards, 1:50.**
- BUF – Keon Coleman 14-yard pass from Josh Allen (Tyler Bass kick), 0:12. Bills 33–0. **Drive: 3 plays, 15 yards, 0:56.**

**Fourth quarter**

- BUF – Tyrell Shavers 69-yard pass from Mitch Trubisky (Tyler Bass kick), 12:37. Bills 40–0. **Drive: 3 plays, 65 yards, 1:38.**
- NYJ – Garrett Wilson 9-yard pass from Tyrod Taylor (Tyrod Taylor–Tyler Conklin pass), 6:59. Bills 40–8. **Drive: 13 plays, 75 yards, 5:38.**
- NYJ – Tyler Conklin 20-yard pass from Tyrod Taylor (pass failed), 1:55. Bills 40–14. **Drive: 8 plays, 58 yards, 2:49.**

**Top passers**

- NYJ – Aaron Rodgers – 12/18, 112 yards, 2 INT
- BUF – Josh Allen – 16/27, 182 yards, 2 TD

**Top rushers**

- NYJ – Breece Hall – 10 rushes, 45 yards
- BUF – James Cook – 15 rushes, 53 yards, TD

**Top receivers**

- NYJ – Garrett Wilson – 7 receptions, 66 yards, TD
- BUF – Tyrell Shavers – 1 reception, 69 yards, TD

Aaron Rodgers was pulled during the 4th quarter after the Jets trailed 40–0 and he had thrown 2 interceptions; with the huge loss, the Jets fell to 4–12.

==== Week 18: vs. Miami Dolphins ====
Week 18: Miami Dolphins at New York Jets – game summary

Quarter	1	2	3	4	Total
Dolphins	6	0	0	14	**20**
**Jets**	0	15	3	14	**32**

at MetLife Stadium, East Rutherford, New Jersey

- Date: January 5
- Game time: 4:25 p.m. EST
- Game weather: Sunny, 34 °F (1 °C)
- Game attendance: 68,818
- Referee: Tra Blake
- TV announcers (Fox): Joe Davis, Greg Olsen and Pam Oliver
- Recap, Game Book

Game information

**First quarter**

- MIA – Jason Sanders 26-yard field goal, 11:46. Dolphins 3–0. **Drive: 4 plays, 7 yards, 1:18.**
- MIA – Jason Sanders 28-yard field goal, 0:00. Dolphins 6–0. **Drive: 9 plays, 76 yards, 5:00.**

**Second quarter**

- NYJ – Tyler Conklin 5-yard pass from Aaron Rodgers (Greg Joseph kick), 7:57. Jets 7–6. **Drive: 8 plays, 79 yards, 3:50.**
- NYJ – Allen Lazard 13-yard pass from Aaron Rodgers (Breece Hall 2-pt Conversion run), 0:59. Jets 15–6. **Drive: 3 plays, 39 yards, 0:48.**

**Third quarter**

- NYJ – Greg Joseph 20-yard field goal, 6:35. Jets 18–6. **Drive: 10 plays, 47 yards, 3:58.**

**Fourth quarter**

- MIA – De'Von Achane 15-yard run (Jason Sanders kick), 14:12. Jets 18–13. **Drive: 14 plays, 78 yards, 7:23.**
- NYJ – Davante Adams 4-yard pass from Aaron Rodgers (Greg Joseph kick), 10:24. Jets 25–13. **Drive: 7 plays, 70 yards, 3:48.**
- MIA – Jonnu Smith 4-yard pass from Tyler Huntley (Jason Sanders kick), 5:21. Jets 25–20. **Drive: 12 plays, 70 yards, 5:03.**
- NYJ – Breece Hall 6-yard pass from Aaron Rodgers (Greg Joseph kick), 2:30. Jets 32–20. **Drive: 9 plays, 70 yards, 2:51.**

**Top passers**

- MIA – Tyler Huntley – 25/41, 227 yards, TD, 2 INT
- NYJ – Aaron Rodgers – 23/36, 274 yards, 4 TD, INT

**Top rushers**

- MIA – De'Von Achane – 11 rushes, 121 yards, TD
- NYJ – Breece Hall – 12 rushes, 57 yards

**Top receivers**

- MIA – Jonnu Smith – 9 receptions, 56 yards, TD
- NYJ – Davante Adams – 6 receptions, 88 yards, TD

The Jets' disappointing season closed on a high note, as Aaron Rodgers threw his 500th career touchdown pass to Tyler Conklin before adding three more in the game, while the Jets' defense forced four turnovers, defeating the Dolphins 32–20 and eliminating them from playoff contention. With the win, the Jets finished the season at 5–12. The Jets would not record another interception until Week 4 of the 2026 season. This would also be Aaron Rodgers' last game with the Jets, as he signed with the Pittsburgh Steelers in the offseason.

=== Standings ===
==== Division ====
AFC East
	W	L	T	PCT	DIV	CONF	PF	PA	STK
^{(2)} Buffalo Bills	13	4	0	.765	5–1	9–3	525	368	L1
Miami Dolphins	8	9	0	.471	3–3	6–6	345	364	L1
New York Jets	5	12	0	.294	2–4	5–7	338	404	W1
New England Patriots	4	13	0	.235	2–4	3–9	289	417	W1

==== Conference ====
AFC
Seed	Team	Division	W	L	T	PCT	DIV	CONF	SOS	SOV	STK
**Division leaders**
1	Kansas City Chiefs	West	15	2	0	.882	5–1	10–2	.488	.463	L1
2	Buffalo Bills	East	13	4	0	.765	5–1	9–3	.467	.448	L1
3	Baltimore Ravens	North	12	5	0	.706	4–2	8–4	.529	.525	W4
4	Houston Texans	South	10	7	0	.588	5–1	8–4	.481	.376	W1
**Wild cards**
5	Los Angeles Chargers	West	11	6	0	.647	4–2	8–4	.467	.348	W3
6 (Note: Pittsburgh clinched the #6 seed over Denver based on head-to-head victory.)	Pittsburgh Steelers	North	10	7	0	.588	3–3	7–5	.502	.453	L4
7	Denver Broncos	West	10	7	0	.588	3–3	6–6	.502	.394	W1
**Did not qualify for the postseason**
8	Cincinnati Bengals	North	9	8	0	.529	3–3	6–6	.478	.314	W5
9 (Note: Indianapolis finished ahead of Miami based on head-to-head victory.)	Indianapolis Colts	South	8	9	0	.471	3–3	7–5	.457	.309	W1
10	Miami Dolphins	East	8	9	0	.471	3–3	6–6	.419	.294	L1
11	New York Jets	East	5	12	0	.294	2–4	5–7	.495	.341	W1
12 (Note: Jacksonville finished ahead of New England and Las Vegas based on conference record. (Jacksonville 4–8 to New England 3–9 to Las Vegas 3–9))	Jacksonville Jaguars	South	4	13	0	.235	3–3	4–8	.478	.265	L1
13 (Note: New England finished ahead of Las Vegas based on strength of victory. (New England .471 to Las Vegas .353))	New England Patriots	East	4	13	0	.235	2–4	3–9	.471	.471	W1
14	Las Vegas Raiders	West	4	13	0	.235	0–6	3–9	.540	.353	L1
15 (Note: Cleveland finished ahead of Tennessee based on strength of victory. (Cleveland .510 to Tennessee .431))	Cleveland Browns	North	3	14	0	.176	2–4	3–9	.536	.510	L6
16	Tennessee Titans	South	3	14	0	.176	1–5	3–9	.522	.431	L6
**Tiebreakers** (Note: When breaking ties for three or more teams under the NFL's rules, they are first broken within divisions, then comparing only the highest ranked remaining team from each division.)

== See also ==
- List of organizational conflicts in the NFL
