= 2023 New York Jets season =

64th season in franchise history

- Owner: Woody and Christopher Johnson
- General manager: Joe Douglas
- Head coach: Robert Saleh
- Home stadium: MetLife Stadium

Results
- Record: 7–10
- Division place: 3rd AFC East
- Playoffs: Did not qualify
- All-Pros: CB Sauce Gardner (1st team); LB Quincy Williams (1st team)
- Pro Bowlers: DT Quinnen Williams; CB Sauce Gardner; LB Jermaine Johnson II

Uniform
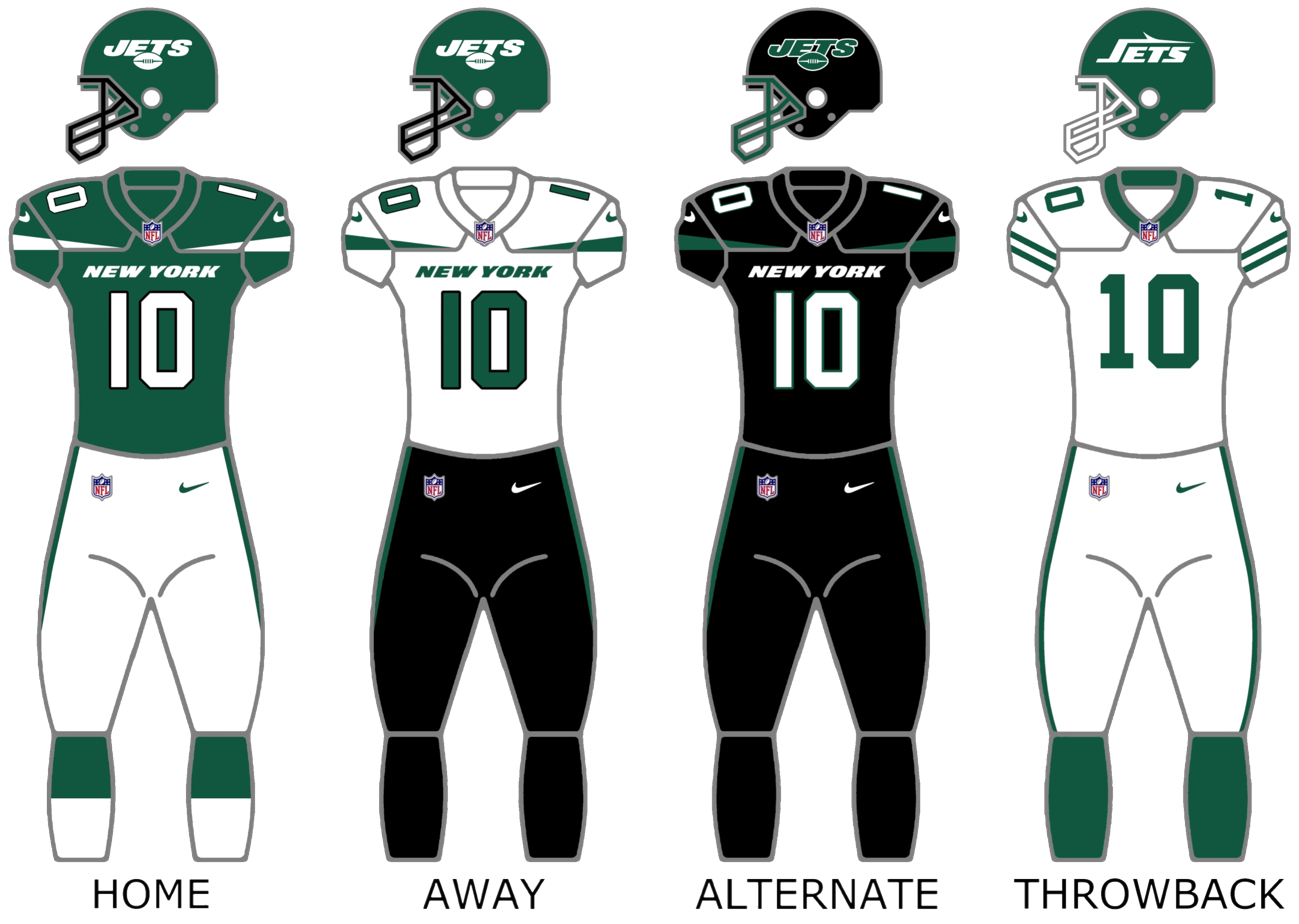

The 2023 season was the New York Jets' 54th season in the National Football League (NFL), their 64th overall, their fifth under general manager Joe Douglas and their third and final full season under head coach Robert Saleh. The season, which was entered with Super Bowl aspirations, was a major disappointment for the team, finishing at 7–10 for the second consecutive season, and matching their record from 2022. It was also the Jets' fourth consecutive season with at least ten losses.

With the acquisition of quarterback Aaron Rodgers in an offseason trade with the Green Bay Packers, expectations were high. However, the season was marred by a series of key injuries, most notably Rodgers suffering a season-ending torn Achilles tendon just four snaps into Week 1. The team struggled with inconsistent quarterback play from Zach Wilson and Tim Boyle throughout the season. Despite starting 4–3, which included their first-ever win against the Philadelphia Eagles after 12 previous losses, the Jets went on a five-game losing streak. They finished the season with a 7–10 record after going 3–2 in their final five games. As a result, the Jets missed the playoffs for the thirteenth consecutive season, extending the longest active postseason drought in the NFL. It was also their eighth consecutive season finishing below .500. The team's preseason was featured on the HBO documentary series Hard Knocks.

The New York Jets drew an average home attendance of 77,890 in 9 home games in the 2023 NFL season.

== Draft ==
2023 New York Jets draft selections
Round	Selection	Player	Position	College	Notes
1	13	Traded to the Green Bay Packers (Note: The Jets traded first-, second- and sixth-round selections (13th, 42nd and 207th overall), and a conditional 2024 second-round selection (that would have become a first-round selection if Rodgers played in 65% of the snaps in 2023, but it was not met) to the Green Bay Packers in exchange for first- and fifth-round selections (15th and 170th overall), and QB Aaron Rodgers.)			
1	15	Will McDonald IV	LB	Iowa State	From Packers
2	42	Traded to the Green Bay Packers			From Browns (Note: The Jets traded a third-round selection (74th overall) and WR Elijah Moore to the Cleveland Browns in exchange for a second-round selection (42nd overall).)
2	43	Joe Tippmann	C	Wisconsin	
3	74	Traded to the Cleveland Browns			
4	112	Traded to the New England Patriots (Note: The Jets traded a fourth-round selection (112th overall) to the New England Patriots in exchange for fourth- and sixth-round selections (120th and 184th overall).)			
4	120	Carter Warren	OT	Pittsburgh	From Steelers via Patriots
5	143	Israel Abanikanda	RB	Pittsburgh	
5	170	Traded to the Las Vegas Raiders (Note: The Jets traded a fifth-round selection (170th overall) to the Las Vegas Raiders in exchange for sixth- and seventh-round selections (204th and 220th overall).)			From Packers
6	184	Zaire Barnes	LB	Western Michigan	From Raiders via Patriots
6	185	Traded to the Jacksonville Jaguars (Note: The Jets traded a sixth-round selection (185th overall) to the Jacksonville Jaguars in exchange for RB James Robinson.)			
6	204	Jarrick Bernard-Converse	CB	LSU	From Cowboys via Raiders
6	207	Traded to the Green Bay Packers			From Texans (Note: The Jets traded LB Blake Cashman to the Houston Texans in exchange for a sixth-round selection (207th overall).)
7	220	Zack Kuntz	TE	Old Dominion	From Cardinals via Raiders
7	230	Traded to the Tampa Bay Buccaneers (Note: The Jets traded a seventh-round selection (230th overall) and NT Steve McLendon to the Tampa Bay Buccaneers in exchange for a 2022 sixth-round selection.)			

2023 New York Jets undrafted free agents
Position	Player	College
DE	Deslin Alexandre	Pittsburgh
WR	Jason Brownlee	Southern Miss
LB	Claudin Cherelus	Alcorn State
S	Trey Dean	Florida
RB	Travis Dye	USC
WR	Xavier Gipson	Stephen F. Austin
LB	Maalik Hall	Southeastern Oklahoma State
TE	E. J. Jenkins	Georgia Tech
LB	Caleb Johnson	Miami
WR	Jerome Kapp	Kutztown
G	Brent Laing	Minnesota Duluth
CB	Derrick Langford	Washington State
WR	T. J. Luther	Gardner–Webb
CB	Nehemiah Shelton	San Jose State
S	Marquis Waters	Texas Tech

Draft trades

== Staff ==
2023 New York Jets staff
Front office: Owner/chairman/CEO – Woody Johnson; Vice chairman – Christopher Johnson; President – Hymie Elhai; Executive vice president/COO – Brian Friedman; General manager – Joe Douglas; Assistant general manager – Rex Hogan; Senior director of football administration – Dave Socie; Director of player personnel – Chad Alexander; Director of pro personnel – Greg Nejmeh; Assistant director of pro personnel – Kevin Murphy; Director of college scouting – Jon Carr; Senior football advisor – Phil Savage; Head coaches: Head coach – Robert Saleh; Offensive coaches: Offensive coordinator – Nathaniel Hackett; Passing game coordinator – Todd Downing; Quarterbacks – Rob Calabrese; Running backs – Taylor Embree; Wide receivers – Zach Azzanni; Tight ends – Ron Middleton; Offensive line/run game coordinator – Keith Carter; Assistant offensive line – Ben Wilkerson; Offensive assistant – Pat Bastien; Offensive assistant – Mack Brown; Offensive assistant/fellowship – Junior Taylor; Offensive assistant – Billy VandeMerkt	Defensive coaches: Defensive coordinator – Jeff Ulbrich; Defensive line – Aaron Whitecotton; Assistant defensive line – Shaq Wilson; Linebackers – Mike Rutenberg; Senior defensive assistant/cornerbacks – Tony Oden; Defensive backs/safeties – Marquand Manuel; Defensive assistant – Ricky Manning Jr; Defensive assistant – Nathaniel Willingham; Special teams coaches: Special teams coordinator – Brant Boyer; Special teams assistant – Michael Ghobrial; Special teams assistant – Leon Washington; Strength and conditioning: Head strength and conditioning – Mike Nicolini; Assistant strength and conditioning – Joe Giacobbe; Assistant strength and conditioning – Aaron McLaurin

== Final roster ==
2023 New York Jets roster
Quarterbacks (QB): 15 Brett Rypien; 14 Trevor Siemian; 8 Aaron Rodgers; Running backs (RB): 25 Israel Abanikanda; 20 Breece Hall; 35 Xazavian Valladay; Wide receivers (WR): 16 Jason Brownlee; 19 Irvin Charles; 18 Randall Cobb; 82 Xavier Gipson; 10 Allen Lazard; 17 Garrett Wilson; Tight ends (TE): 83 Tyler Conklin; 81 Zack Kuntz; 88 Kenny Yeboah	Offensive linemen (OL): 77 Mekhi Becton T; 64 Austin Deculus T; 63 Chris Glaser G; 61 Max Mitchell T; 65 Xavier Newman-Johnson G; 66 Joe Tippmann C; 78 Laken Tomlinson G; 54 Billy Turner T; 67 Carter Warren T; Defensive linemen (DL): 72 Micheal Clemons DE; 91 John Franklin-Myers DE; 98 Bruce Hector DT; 97 Jalyn Holmes DE; 58 Carl Lawson DE; 99 Will McDonald IV DE; 47 Bryce Huff DE; 94 Solomon Thomas DT; 95 Quinnen Williams DT	Linebackers (LB): 52 Samuel Eguavoen OLB; 11 Jermaine Johnson II OLB; 41 Marcelino McCrary-Ball OLB; 57 C. J. Mosley MLB; 44 Jamien Sherwood OLB; 55 Chazz Surratt OLB; 56 Quincy Williams OLB; Defensive backs (DB): 22 Tony Adams FS; 29 Jarrick Bernard-Converse FS; 30 Michael Carter II CB; 21 Ashtyn Davis SS; 26 Brandin Echols CB; 1 Sauce Gardner CB; 37 Bryce Hall CB; 34 Justin Hardee CB; 4 D. J. Reed CB; 3 Jordan Whitehead SS; Special teams (ST): 42 Thomas Hennessy LS; 5 Thomas Morstead P; 9 Greg Zuerlein K	Practice squad: 48 Nick Bawden FB; 32 Anthony Brown CB; 38 Trey Dean SS; 68 Obinna Eze LT; 50 Vitaliy Gurman G; 27 Tae Hayes CB; 93 Manny Jones DE; 85 Lance McCutcheon WR; 31 Jacques Patrick RB; 15 Austin Seibert K; 79 Tanzel Smart DT (PS/I); 51 Marquiss Spencer DT; 86 Malik Taylor WR; 92 Perrion Winfrey DT (PS/I); Reserve: 50 Bradlee Anae DE (IR); 53 Zaire Barnes MLB (IR); 76 Duane Brown LT (IR); 23 Chuck Clark FS (IR); 62 Jake Hanson C (IR); 70 Quinton Jefferson DT (IR); 60 Connor McGovern C (IR); 92 Ifeadi Odenigbo DE (IR); 89 Jeremy Ruckert TE (IR); 71 Wes Schweitzer G (IR); 87 C. J. Uzomah TE (IR); 75 Alijah Vera-Tucker G (IR); 2 Zach Wilson QB (IR); 96 Al Woods DT (IR); Rookies in italics 53 active, 14 reserve, 12 practice squad (2 exempt)

== Preseason ==
Week	Date	Opponent	Result	Record	Venue	Recap
HOF	August 3	Cleveland Browns	L 16–21	0–1	Tom Benson Hall of Fame Stadium	Recap
1	August 12	at Carolina Panthers	W 27–0	1–1	Bank of America Stadium	Recap
2	August 19	Tampa Bay Buccaneers	L 6–13	1–2	MetLife Stadium	Recap
3	August 26	at New York Giants	W 32–24	2–2	MetLife Stadium	Recap

== Regular season ==
The Jets became the second NFL team to play ten regular season games in their home stadium, nine home games as an AFC team in an odd-numbered year plus an away game against the Giants, who share their stadium with the Jets. The first such team was the Los Angeles Rams, who played ten games the previous season at SoFi Stadium under similar circumstances.

=== Schedule ===
Week	Date	Opponent	Result	Record	Venue	Recap
1	September 11	**Buffalo Bills**	**W** 22–16 (OT)	1–0	MetLife Stadium	Recap
2	September 17	at Dallas Cowboys	**L** 10–30	1–1	AT&T Stadium	Recap
3	September 24	**New England Patriots**	**L** 10–15	1–2	MetLife Stadium	Recap
4	October 1	Kansas City Chiefs	**L** 20–23	1–3	MetLife Stadium	Recap
5	October 8	at Denver Broncos	**W** 31–21	2–3	Empower Field at Mile High	Recap
6	October 15	Philadelphia Eagles	**W** 20–14	3–3	MetLife Stadium	Recap
7	Bye					
8	October 29	at New York Giants	**W** 13–10 (OT)	4–3	MetLife Stadium	Recap
9	November 6	Los Angeles Chargers	**L** 6–27	4–4	MetLife Stadium	Recap
10	November 12	at Las Vegas Raiders	**L** 12–16	4–5	Allegiant Stadium	Recap
11	November 19	at **Buffalo Bills**	**L** 6–32	4–6	Highmark Stadium	Recap
12	November 24	**Miami Dolphins**	**L** 13–34	4–7	MetLife Stadium	Recap
13	December 3	Atlanta Falcons	**L** 8–13	4–8	MetLife Stadium	Recap
14	December 10	Houston Texans	**W** 30–6	5–8	MetLife Stadium	Recap
15	December 17	at **Miami Dolphins**	**L** 0–30	5–9	Hard Rock Stadium	Recap
16	December 24	Washington Commanders	**W** 30–28	6–9	MetLife Stadium	Recap
17	December 28	at Cleveland Browns	**L** 20–37	6–10	Cleveland Browns Stadium	Recap
18	January 7	at **New England Patriots**	**W** 17–3	7–10	Gillette Stadium	Recap

Note: Intra-division opponents are in bold text.

=== Game summaries ===
==== Week 1: vs. Buffalo Bills ====
Week 1: Buffalo Bills at New York Jets – Game summary

Quarter	1	2	3	4	OT	Total
Bills	3	10	0	3	0	**16**
**Jets**	0	3	3	10	6	**22**

at MetLife Stadium, East Rutherford, New Jersey

- Date: September 11
- Game time: 8:15 p.m. EDT
- Game weather: Rain, 72 °F (22 °C)
- Game attendance: 83,345
- Referee: Carl Cheffers
- TV announcers (ESPN/ABC): Joe Buck, Troy Aikman and Lisa Salters
- Recap, Game Book

Game information

**First quarter**

- BUF – Tyler Bass 40-yard field goal, 3:05. Bills 3–0. **Drive: 11 plays, 55 yards, 6:19.**

**Second quarter**

- NYJ – Greg Zuerlein 26-yard field goal, 10:35. Tied 3–3. **Drive: 5 plays, 88 yards, 2:27.**
- BUF – Stefon Diggs 5-yard pass from Josh Allen (Tyler Bass kick), 4:43. Bills 10–3. **Drive: 11 plays, 75 yards, 5:52.**
- BUF – Tyler Bass 34-yard field goal, 0:17. Bills 13–3. **Drive: 9 plays, 34 yards, 2:51.**

**Third quarter**

- NYJ – Greg Zuerlein 43-yard field goal, 8:59. Bills 13–6. **Drive: 12 plays, 50 yards, 6:01.**

**Fourth quarter**

- NYJ – Garrett Wilson 3-yard pass from Zach Wilson (Greg Zuerlein kick), 4:55. Tied 13–13. **Drive: 8 plays, 57 yards, 4:48.**
- NYJ – Greg Zuerlein 30-yard field goal, 1:48. Jets 16–13. **Drive: 8 plays, 15 yards, 3:03.**
- BUF – Tyler Bass 50-yard field goal, 0:02. Tied 16–16. **Drive: 9 plays, 42 yards, 1:46.**

**Overtime**

- NYJ – Xavier Gipson 65-yard punt return, 9:02. Jets 22–16.

**Top passers**

- BUF – Josh Allen – 29/41, 236 yards, TD, 3 INT
- NYJ – Zach Wilson – 14/21, 140 yards, TD, INT

**Top rushers**

- BUF – James Cook – 12 rushes, 46 yards
- NYJ – Breece Hall – 10 rushes, 127 yards

**Top receivers**

- BUF – Stefon Diggs – 10 receptions, 102 yards, TD
- NYJ – Allen Lazard – 2 receptions, 46 yards

Just hours before kickoff, there was heavy rain and severe thunderstorm warnings around the Meadowlands. As a result, media coverage and personnel were not permitted to step on the field. It was rumored that the game would have been delayed, or postponed given the severity of the weather warnings. The game, nevertheless, ended up being played on time.

New quarterback Aaron Rodgers was injured and carted off the field after being sacked by Bills edge rusher Leonard Floyd on just his fourth snap, and Buffalo attained a 13–3 halftime lead. However, a strong performance by the Jets defense, which forced Bills quarterback Josh Allen to turn the ball over four times, allowed the Jets offense, now led by backup Zach Wilson, to have short fields and take the lead after the two-minute warning, though Allen and the Bills forced overtime with a late field goal. The Jets won off a punt return touchdown by Xavier Gipson after the Bills went three-and-out on the opening possession of the extra period.

With the win, New York opened the season at 1–0, though the victory was marred by Rodgers' injury, which was revealed to be a ruptured Achilles tendon, ending his season. Head coach Robert Saleh named Wilson the starting quarterback for the remainder of the season.

The game broke the record for the most-watched NFL game in ESPN's history, though that was later overtaken by the Philadelphia Eagles–Kansas City Chiefs game on November 20.

==== Week 2: at Dallas Cowboys ====
Week 2: New York Jets at Dallas Cowboys – Game summary

Quarter	1	2	3	4	Total
Jets	0	10	0	0	**10**
**Cowboys**	7	11	6	6	**30**

at AT&T Stadium, Arlington, Texas

- Date: September 17
- Game time: 4:25 p.m. EDT/3:25 p.m. CDT
- Game weather: None (retractable roof closed)
- Game attendance: 93,689
- Referee: Clete Blakeman
- TV announcers (CBS): Jim Nantz, Tony Romo and Tracy Wolfson
- Recap, Game Book

Game information

**First quarter**

- DAL – Jake Ferguson 4-yard pass from Dak Prescott (Brandon Aubrey kick), 9:19. Cowboys 7–0. **Drive: 12 plays, 75 yards, 5:41.**

**Second quarter**

- DAL – Brandon Aubrey 35-yard field goal, 9:10. Cowboys 10–0. **Drive: 14 plays, 78 yards, 6:44.**
- NYJ – Garrett Wilson 68-yard pass from Zach Wilson (Austin Seibert kick), 7:12. Cowboys 10–7. **Drive: 1 play, 68 yards, 0:09.**
- DAL – Luke Schoonmaker 1-yard pass from Dak Prescott (Tony Pollard run), 1:52. Cowboys 18–7. **Drive: 13 plays, 75 yards, 5:20.**
- NYJ – Austin Seibert 34-yard field goal, 0:04. Cowboys 18–10. **Drive: 11 plays, 59 yards, 1:48.**

**Third quarter**

- DAL – Brandon Aubrey 21-yard field goal, 7:24. Cowboys 21–10. **Drive: 12 plays, 55 yards, 5:52.**
- DAL – Brandon Aubrey 55-yard field goal, 5:19. Cowboys 24–10. **Drive: 4 plays, 1 yard, 1:22.**

**Fourth quarter**

- DAL – Brandon Aubrey 26-yard field goal, 12:23. Cowboys 27–10. **Drive: 12 plays, 71 yards, 6:21.**
- DAL – Brandon Aubrey 30-yard field goal, 8:18. Cowboys 30–10. **Drive: 6 plays, 5 yards, 3:18.**

**Top passers**

- NYJ – Zach Wilson – 10/22, 154 yards, TD, 3 INT
- DAL – Dak Prescott – 30/37, 249 yards, 2 TD

**Top rusher'**

- NYJ – Zach Wilson – 5 rushes, 36 yards
- DAL – Tony Pollard – 22 rushes, 66 yards

**Top receiver**

- NYJ – Garrett Wilson – 2 receptions, 83 yards, TD
- DAL – CeeDee Lamb – 11 receptions, 143 yards

The Cowboys opened the game with a long 12-play touchdown drive, ending with Dallas quarterback Dak Prescott's first touchdown pass of the 2023 season to tight end Jake Ferguson. Dallas later added to their lead with a 13-play, 75-yard field goal drive in the 2nd quarter. After the teams traded punts, the New York Jets fought back with a quick 68-yard touchdown pass from quarterback Zach Wilson to standout wide receiver Garrett Wilson. Dallas quickly responded with a long touchdown drive of their own, which was capped off with a short Dak Prescott touchdown pass to tight end Luke Schoonmaker. The Jets replied with a field goal from backup kicker Austin Seibert to keep the score within one possession at the end of the half.

The third quarter, however, would prove to be the turning point in the game as the Jets were only able to muster a measly 68 yards of offense in the second half while also giving up a fumble and three interceptions. On the other hand, the Dallas Cowboys were able to produce four field goal drives to end the game with a 30–10 victory.

This was the first time the Cowboys defeated the New York Jets since 2007 and is also the first time the New York Jets defense has given up 30 or more points since Week 2 of the 2022 NFL Season.

==== Week 3: vs. New England Patriots ====
Week 3: New England Patriots at New York Jets – Game summary

Quarter	1	2	3	4	Total
**Patriots**	3	7	3	2	**15**
Jets	0	3	0	7	**10**

at MetLife Stadium, East Rutherford, New Jersey

- Date: September 24
- Game time: 1:00 p.m. EDT
- Game weather: Rain, 65 °F (18 °C)
- Game attendance: 80,878
- Referee: Bill Vinovich
- TV announcers (CBS): Jim Nantz, Tony Romo and Tracy Wolfson
- Recap, Game Book

Game information

**First quarter**

- NE – Chad Ryland 48-yard field goal, 10:41. Patriots 3–0. **Drive: 7 plays, 29 yards, 2:37.**

**Second quarter**

- NE – Pharaoh Brown 58-yard pass from Mac Jones (Chad Ryland kick), 11:38. Patriots 10–0. **Drive: 4 plays, 78 yards, 2:09.**
- NYJ – Greg Zuerlein 52-yard field goal, 1:21. Patriots 10–3. **Drive: 10 plays, 33 yards, 6:08.**

**Third quarter**

- NE – Chad Ryland 51-yard field goal, 10:26. Patriots 13–3. **Drive: 10 plays, 42 yards, 4:34.**

**Fourth quarter**

- NYJ – Nick Bawden 1-yard run (Greg Zuerlein kick), 5:24. Patriots 13–10. **Drive: 13 plays, 87 yards, 5:22.**
- NE – Zach Wilson sacked in end zone by Matthew Judon for a safety, 2:19. Patriots 15–10.

**Top passers**

- NE – Mac Jones – 15/29, 201 yards, TD
- NYJ – Zach Wilson – 18/36, 157 yards

**Top rusher'**

- NE – Ezekiel Elliott – 16 rushes, 80 yards
- NYJ – Breece Hall – 12 rushes, 18 yards

**Top receiver**

- NE – Pharaoh Brown – 2 receptions, 71 yards, TD
- NYJ – Garrett Wilson – 5 receptions, 48 yards

The loss to their division rival was the team's 15th straight against them. The Jets fell to 1–2 as a result. The Jets last beat the Patriots in Week 16 of the 2015 NFL season.

==== Week 4: vs. Kansas City Chiefs ====
Week 4: Kansas City Chiefs at New York Jets – Game summary

Quarter	1	2	3	4	Total
**Chiefs**	17	3	0	3	**23**
Jets	0	12	8	0	**20**

at MetLife Stadium, East Rutherford, New Jersey

- Date: October 1
- Game time: 8:20 p.m. EDT
- Game weather: Clear, 69 °F (21 °C)
- Game attendance: 80,461
- Referee: Alex Kemp
- TV announcers (NBC): Mike Tirico, Cris Collinsworth and Melissa Stark
- Recap, Game Book

Game information

**First quarter**

- KC – Harrison Butker 37-yard field goal, 11:35. Chiefs 3–0. **Drive: 8 plays, 57 yards, 3:25.**
- KC – Isiah Pacheco 48-yard run (Harrison Butker kick), 8:32. Chiefs 10–0. **Drive: 5 plays, 69 yards, 2:03.**
- KC – Noah Gray 34-yard pass from Patrick Mahomes (Harrison Butker kick), 3:24. Chiefs 17–0. **Drive: 6 plays, 89 yards, 2:48.**

**Second quarter**

- NYJ – Jawaan Taylor face mask penalty in end-zone resulting in safety, 13:20. Chiefs 17–2.
- NYJ – Greg Zuerlein 31-yard field goal, 9:50. Chiefs 17–5. **Drive: 7 plays, 62 yards, 3:30.**
- NYJ – C. J. Uzomah 1-yard pass from Zach Wilson (Greg Zuerlein kick), 6:26. Chiefs 17–12. **Drive: 7 plays, 41 yards, 3:16.**
- KC – Harrison Butker 37-yard field goal, 2:15. Chiefs 20–12. **Drive: 10 plays, 56 yards, 4:11.**

**Third quarter**

- NYJ – Allen Lazard 10-yard pass from Zach Wilson (Zach Wilson run), 10:40. Tied 20–20. **Drive: 7 plays, 75 yards, 4:20.**

**Fourth quarter**

- KC – Harrison Butker 26-yard field goal, 2:15. Chiefs 23–20. **Drive: 14 plays, 80 yards, 7:23.**

**Top passers**

- KC – Patrick Mahomes – 18/30, 203 yards, TD, 2 INT
- NYJ – Zach Wilson – 28/39, 245 yards, 2 TD

**Top rusher'**

- KC – Isiah Pacheco – 20 rushes, 115 yards, TD
- NYJ – Breece Hall – 6 rushes, 56 yards

**Top receiver**

- KC – Travis Kelce – 6 receptions, 60 yards
- NYJ – Allen Lazard – 3 receptions, 61 yards, TD

In New York's first Sunday Night Football appearance in 12 years, the Jets overcame a 17–0 first quarter deficit, tying the game at 20 in the third quarter and limiting reigning Super Bowl MVP Patrick Mahomes to a 63.6 passer rating. However, the Chiefs regained the lead late, and a crucial fumble from Zach Wilson, who otherwise had one of the best performances in his career, allowed Kansas City to close out the game.

==== Week 5: at Denver Broncos ====
Week 5: New York Jets at Denver Broncos – Game summary

Quarter	1	2	3	4	Total
**Jets**	5	3	10	13	**31**
Broncos	7	6	0	8	**21**

at Empower Field at Mile High, Denver, Colorado

- Date: October 8
- Game time: 4:25 p.m. EDT/2:25 p.m. MDT
- Game weather: Sunny, 73 °F (23 °C)
- Game attendance: 76,387
- Referee: John Hussey
- TV announcers (CBS): Andrew Catalon, Tiki Barber, Matt Ryan and AJ Ross
- Recap, Game Book

Game information

**First quarter**

- NYJ – Greg Zuerlein 30-yard field goal, 11:19. Jets 3–0. **Drive: 5 plays, 8 yards, 1:29.**
- DEN – Jaleel McLaughlin 22-yard pass from Russell Wilson (Wil Lutz kick), 7:34. Broncos 7–3. **Drive: 6 plays, 75 yards, 3:45.**
- NYJ – Intentional grounding penalty on Russell Wilson in end zone for a safety, 4:17. Broncos 7–5.

**Second quarter**

- DEN – Wil Lutz 23-yard field goal, 12:47. Broncos 10–5. **Drive: 8 plays, 52 yards, 4:12.**
- NYJ – Greg Zuerlein 26-yard field goal, 6:41. Broncos 10–8. **Drive: 11 plays, 67 yards, 6:06.**
- DEN – Wil Lutz 22-yard field goal, 1:48. Broncos 13–8. **Drive: 11 plays, 71 yards, 4:53.**

**Third quarter**

- NYJ – Breece Hall 72-yard run (Greg Zuerlein kick), 13:29. Jets 15–13. **Drive: 1 play, 72 yards, 0:10.**
- NYJ – Greg Zuerlein 27-yard field goal, 5:16. Jets 18–13. **Drive: 10 plays, 40 yards, 6:03.**

**Fourth quarter**

- NYJ – Greg Zuerlein 22-yard field goal, 12:19. Jets 21–13. **Drive: 10 plays, 47 yards, 5:52.**
- NYJ – Greg Zuerlein 49-yard field goal, 7:27. Jets 24–13. **Drive: 5 plays, 41 yards, 2:58.**
- DEN – Adam Trautman 3-yard pass from Russell Wilson (Michael Burton run), 4:44. Jets 24–21. **Drive: 7 plays, 75 yards, 2:43.**
- NYJ – Bryce Hall 39-yard fumble return (Greg Zuerlein kick), 0:29. Jets 31–21.

**Top passers**

- NYJ – Zach Wilson – 19/26, 199 yards, INT
- DEN – Russell Wilson – 20/31, 196 yards, 2 TD

**Top rusher**

- NYJ – Breece Hall – 22 rushes, 177 yards, TD
- DEN – Jaleel McLaughlin – 9 rushes, 68 yards

**Top receiver**

- NYJ – Tyler Conklin – 4 receptions, 67 yards
- DEN – Samaje Perine – 4 receptions, 73 yards

For the first time in history, the Jets had safeties in back to back games.

==== Week 6: vs. Philadelphia Eagles ====
Week 6: Philadelphia Eagles at New York Jets – Game summary

Quarter	1	2	3	4	Total
Eagles	7	7	0	0	**14**
**Jets**	0	9	3	8	**20**

at MetLife Stadium, East Rutherford, New Jersey

- Date: October 15
- Game time: 4:25 p.m. EDT
- Game weather: Partly cloudy, 59 °F (15 °C)
- Game attendance: 83,068
- Referee: Scott Novak
- TV announcers (Fox): Kevin Kugler, Mark Sanchez, and Laura Okmin
- Recap, Game Book

Game information

**First quarter**

- PHI – Jalen Hurts 3-yard run (Jake Elliott kick), 3:04. Eagles 7–0. **Drive: 19 plays, 91 yards, 9:47.**

**Second quarter**

- NYJ – Greg Zuerlein 43-yard field goal, 13:12. Eagles 7–3. **Drive: 11 plays, 50 yards, 4:52.**
- PHI – D'Andre Swift 9-yard pass from Jalen Hurts (Jake Elliott kick), 5:32. Eagles 14–3. **Drive: 6 plays, 64 yards, 2:53.**
- NYJ – Greg Zuerlein 42-yard field goal, 2:30. Eagles 14–6. **Drive: 8 plays, 51 yards, 3:02.**
- NYJ – Greg Zuerlein 35-yard field goal, 0:00. Eagles 14–9. **Drive: 8 plays, 34 yards, 1:40.**

**Third quarter**

- NYJ – Greg Zuerlein 38-yard field goal, 0:00. Eagles 14–12. **Drive: 10 plays, 16 yards, 4:45.**

**Fourth quarter**

- NYJ – Breece Hall 8-yard run (Zach Wilson–Randall Cobb pass), 1:46. Jets 20–14. **Drive: 1 play, 8 yards, 0:04.**

**Top passers**

- PHI – Jalen Hurts – 28/45, 280 yards, TD, 3 INT
- NYJ – Zach Wilson – 19/33, 186 yards

**Top rushers**

- PHI – Jalen Hurts – 8 rushes, 47 yards, TD
- NYJ – Breece Hall – 12 rushes, 39 yards, TD

**Top receivers**

- PHI – A. J. Brown – 7 receptions, 131 yards
- NYJ – Garrett Wilson – 8 receptions, 90 yards

The Jets returned home to face the undefeated Philadelphia Eagles, whom they had an 0–12 lifetime record against. After facing a 14–3 deficit in the second quarter, the Jets managed to silence Philadelphia's offense the remainder of the way, and simultaneously chip away at the deficit, pulling within two points by the third quarter. Right after the two minute warning, Tony Adams intercepted Jalen Hurts — the third interception forced by the Jets defense — and returned the ball 45 yards to set New York up inside the Eagles' 10 yard line. On the very next play, Breece Hall scored the go-ahead touchdown for the Jets. The defense then made one final stop on the ensuing Philadelphia drive to preserve the Jets' upset win. With this win, their first ever in thirteen meetings with the Eagles, the Jets improved to 3–3.

==== Week 8: at New York Giants ====
Week 8: New York Jets at New York Giants – Game summary

Quarter	1	2	3	4	OT	Total
**Jets**	7	0	0	3	3	**13**
Giants	3	0	7	0	0	**10**

at MetLife Stadium, East Rutherford, New Jersey

- Date: October 29
- Game time: 1:00 p.m. EDT
- Game weather: Rain, 51 °F (11 °C)
- Game attendance: 83,367
- Referee: Shawn Smith
- TV announcers (CBS): Andrew Catalon, Tiki Barber, Matt Ryan and AJ Ross
- Recap, Game Book

Game information

**First quarter**

- NYG – Graham Gano 31-yard field goal, 12:07. Giants 3–0. **Drive: 4 plays, 6 yards, 1:26.**
- NYJ – Breece Hall 50-yard pass from Zach Wilson (Greg Zuerlein kick), 1:06. Jets 7–3. **Drive: 1 plays, 50 yards, 0:12.**

**Second quarter**

- No scoring plays.

**Third quarter**

- NYJ – Tommy DeVito 6-yard run (Graham Gano kick), 8:59. Giants 10–7. **Drive: 11 plays, 75 yards, 6:01.**

**Fourth quarter**

- NYJ – Greg Zuerlein 35-yard field goal, 0:00. Tied 10–10. **Drive: 4 plays, 58 yards, 0:24.**

**Overtime**

- NYJ – Greg Zuerlein 33-yard field goal, 6:09. Jets 13–10. **Drive: 6 plays, 46 yards, 2:02.**

**Top passers**

- NYJ – Zach Wilson – 17/36, 240 yards, TD
- NYG – Tyrod Taylor – 4/7, 8 yards

**Top rushers**

- NYJ – Zach Wilson – 4 rushes, 25 yards
- NYG – Saquon Barkley – 36 rushes, 128 yards

**Top receivers**

- NYJ – Garrett Wilson – 7 receptions, 100 yards
- NYG – Saquon Barkley – 3 receptions, 0 yards

Despite the Giants leading 10–7 and the Jets having no timeouts remaining, a missed field goal from Graham Gano with 24 seconds left set the Jets up on a game tying drive, with Zach Wilson throwing two 29-yard passes to set up the game tying field goal. In overtime, the Jets forced the Giants to punt before the Jets kicked a game winning field goal in overtime to improve to 4–3.

==== Week 9: vs. Los Angeles Chargers ====
Week 9: Los Angeles Chargers at New York Jets – Game summary

Quarter	1	2	3	4	Total
**Chargers**	14	3	0	10	**27**
Jets	0	3	3	0	**6**

at MetLife Stadium, East Rutherford, New Jersey

- Date: November 6
- Game time: 8:15 p.m. EST
- Game weather: Mostly cloudy, 48 °F (9 °C)
- Game attendance: 75,407
- Referee: Craig Wrolstad
- TV announcers (ESPN/ABC): Joe Buck, Troy Aikman and Lisa Salters
- Recap, Game Book

Game information

**First quarter**

- LAC – Derius Davis 87-yard punt return (Cameron Dicker kick), 13:15. Chargers 7–0.
- LAC – Austin Ekeler 1-yard run (Cameron Dicker kick), 2:45. Chargers 14–0. **Drive: 8 plays, 50 yards, 3:42.**

**Second quarter**

- NYJ – Greg Zuerlein 47-yard field goal, 5:57. Chargers 14–3. **Drive: 7 plays, 26 yards, 3:23.**
- LAC – Cameron Dicker 55-yard field goal, 0:00. Chargers 17–3. **Drive: 3 plays, 21 yards, 0:07.**

**Third quarter**

- NYJ – Greg Zuerlein 46-yard field goal, 9:52. Chargers 17–6. **Drive: 9 plays, 47 yards, 5:08.**

**Fourth quarter**

- LAC – Cameron Dicker 38-yard field goal, 9:18. Chargers 20–6. **Drive: 16 plays, 68 yards, 8:17.**
- LAC – Austin Ekeler 2-yard run (Cameron Dicker kick), 3:22. Chargers 27–6. **Drive: 1 play, 2 yards, 0:06.**

**Top passers**

- LAC – Justin Herbert – 16/30, 136 yards
- NYJ – Zach Wilson – 33/49, 263 yards

**Top rushers**

- LAC – Austin Ekeler – 14 rushes, 47 yards, 2 TD
- NYJ – Breece Hall – 16 rushes, 50 yards

**Top receivers**

- LAC – Keenan Allen – 8 receptions, 77 yards
- NYJ – Garrett Wilson – 7 receptions, 80 yards

The Jets offense once again struggled, as Zach Wilson got sacked 8 times by the Chargers defense.

==== Week 10: at Las Vegas Raiders ====
Week 10: New York Jets at Las Vegas Raiders – Game summary

Quarter	1	2	3	4	Total
Jets	6	3	0	3	**12**
**Raiders**	3	3	3	7	**16**

at Allegiant Stadium, Paradise, Nevada

- Date: November 12
- Game time: 8:20 p.m. EST/5:20 p.m. PST
- Game weather: None (indoor stadium)
- Game attendance: 62,383
- Referee: Shawn Hochuli
- TV announcers (NBC): Mike Tirico, Cris Collinsworth and Melissa Stark
- Recap, Game Book

Game information

**First quarter**

- NYJ – Greg Zuerlein 47-yard field goal, 10:13. Jets 3–0. **Drive: 8 plays, 49 yards, 3:13.**
- LV – Daniel Carlson 41-yard field goal, 6:15. Tied 3–3. **Drive: 6 plays, 53 yards, 3:58.**
- NYJ – Greg Zuerlein 53-yard field goal, 1:11. Jets 6–3. **Drive: 9 plays, 40 yards, 5:04.**

**Second quarter**

- NYJ – Greg Zuerlein 30-yard field goal, 11:48. Jets 9–3. **Drive: 8 plays, 14 yards, 3:39.**
- LV – Daniel Carlson 54-yard field goal, 0:00. Jets 9–6. **Drive: 8 plays, 44 yards, 0:52.**

**Third quarter**

- LV – Daniel Carlson 40-yard field goal, 2:36. Tied 9–9. **Drive: 11 plays, 23 yards, 6:12.**

**Fourth quarter**

- LV – Michael Mayer 7-yard pass from Aidan O'Connell (Daniel Carlson kick), 14:10. Raiders 16–9. **Drive: 5 plays, 53 yards, 1:36.**
- NYJ – Greg Zuerlein 45-yard field goal, 11:58. Raiders 16–12. **Drive: 6 plays, 48 yards, 2:12.**

**Top passers**

- NYJ – Zach Wilson – 23/39, 263 yards, INT
- LV – Aidan O'Connell – 16/27, 153 yards, TD, INT

**Top rushers**

- NYJ – Zach Wilson – 4 rushes, 54 yards
- LV – Josh Jacobs – 27 rushes, 116 yards

**Top receivers**

- NYJ – Garrett Wilson – 9 receptions, 93 yards
- LV – Davante Adams - 6 receptions, 86 yards

The Jets offense continued to struggle, failing to score a touchdown for the second straight game.

==== Week 11: at Buffalo Bills ====
Week 11: New York Jets at Buffalo Bills – Game summary

Quarter	1	2	3	4	Total
Jets	0	6	0	0	**6**
**Bills**	6	10	13	3	**32**

at Highmark Stadium, Orchard Park, New York

- Date: November 19
- Game time: 4:25 p.m. EST
- Game weather: Clear, 40 °F (4 °C)
- Game attendance: 70,603
- Referee: Alan Eck
- TV announcers (CBS): Jim Nantz, Tony Romo and Tracy Wolfson
- Recap, Game Book

Game information

**First quarter**

- BUF – Tyler Bass 48-yard field goal, 13:31. Bills 3–0. **Drive: 4 plays, 9 yards, 1:22.**
- BUF – Tyler Bass 30-yard field goal, 5:56. Bills 6–0. **Drive: 14 plays, 58 yards, 6:05.**

**Second quarter**

- BUF – Tyler Bass 33-yard field goal, 11:26. Bills 9–0. **Drive: 9 plays, 65 yards, 5:52.**
- BUF – James Cook 5-yard pass from Josh Allen (Tyler Bass kick), 3:03. Bills 16–0. **Drive: 5 plays, 23 yards, 2:16.**
- NYJ – Breece Hall 9-yard pass from Zach Wilson (pass failed), 0:45. Bills 16–6. **Drive: 11 plays, 84 yards, 2:18.**

**Third quarter**

- BUF – Ty Johnson 28-yard pass from Josh Allen (kick failed), 10:34. Bills 22–6. **Drive: 8 plays, 75 yards, 4:26.**
- BUF – Khalil Shakir 81-yard pass from Josh Allen (Tyler Bass kick), 6:29. Bills 29–6. **Drive: 2 plays, 86 yards, 0:55.**

**Fourth quarter**

- BUF – Tyler Bass 50-yard field goal, 5:16. Bills 32–6. **Drive: 7 plays, 22 yards, 4:17.**

**Top passers**

- NYJ – Zach Wilson – 7/15, 81 yards, TD, INT
- BUF – Josh Allen – 20/32, 275 yards, 3 TD, INT

**Top rushers**

- NYJ – Breece Hall – 10 rushes, 23 yards
- BUF – James Cook – 17 rushes, 73 yards

**Top receivers**

- NYJ – Breece Hall – 5 receptions, 50 yards, TD
- BUF – Dalton Kincaid – 6 receptions, 46 yards

The Jets scored their first touchdown in 13 quarters of gameplay dating back to their win over the Giants. However, the team otherwise struggled on offense, netting just 155 total yards and turning the ball over three times, leading to Zach Wilson being benched for Tim Boyle in the third quarter. In addition, Buffalo, which had just fired offensive coordinator Ken Dorsey the week before, performed much more effectively on offense as compared to week 1, putting up the most points allowed by the Jets defense at this point of the season and surrendering just one turnover on a Hail Mary attempt at the end of the first half. Notably, the Bills scored 10 points off Jets turnovers, with their first field goal coming off a fumbled opening kickoff return from Xavier Gipson, who had scored the game-winning punt return touchdown in week 1. New York fell to 4–6 with the blowout loss to the Bills.

==== Week 12: vs. Miami Dolphins ====
Black Friday games

Week 12: Miami Dolphins at New York Jets – Game summary

Quarter	1	2	3	4	Total
**Dolphins**	3	14	3	14	**34**
Jets	0	6	0	7	**13**

at MetLife Stadium, East Rutherford, New Jersey

- Date: November 24
- Game time: 3:00 p.m. EST
- Game weather: Partly sunny, 48 °F (9 °C)
- Game attendance: 82,973
- Referee: John Hussey
- TV announcers (WNYW/Prime Video): Al Michaels, Kirk Herbstreit and Kaylee Hartung
- Recap, Game Book

Game information

**First quarter**

- MIA – Jason Sanders 38-yard field goal, 1:26. Dolphins 3–0. **Drive: 7 plays, 36 yards, 3:31.**

**Second quarter**

- MIA – Tyreek Hill 7-yard pass from Tua Tagovailoa (Jason Sanders kick), 8:21. Dolphins 10–0. **Drive: 11 plays, 60 yards, 5:59.**
- NYJ – Brandin Echols 30-yard interception return (kick failed), 0:58. Dolphins 10–6.
- MIA – Jevon Holland 99-yard interception return (Jason Sanders kick), 0:00. Dolphins 17–6.

**Third quarter**

- MIA – Jason Sanders 54-yard field goal, 11:16. Dolphins 20–6. **Drive: 7 plays, 39 yards, 3:44.**

**Fourth quarter**

- MIA – Raheem Mostert 13-yard run (Jason Sanders kick), 14:55. Dolphins 27–6. **Drive: 15 plays, 92 yards, 9:03.**
- NYJ – Garrett Wilson 1-yard pass from Tim Boyle (Greg Zuerlein kick), 4:37. Dolphins 27–13. **Drive: 6 plays, 35 yards, 1:48.**
- MIA – Raheem Mostert 34-yard run (Jason Sanders kick), 3:35. Dolphins 34–13. **Drive: 4 plays, 46 yards, 1:02.**

**Top passers**

- MIA – Tua Tagovailoa – 21/30, 243 yards, TD, 2 INT
- NYJ – Tim Boyle – 27/38, 179 yards, TD, 2 INT

**Top rushers**

- MIA – Raheem Mostert – 20 rushes, 94 yards, 2 TD
- NYJ – Breece Hall – 7 rushes, 25 yards

**Top receivers**

- MIA – Tyreek Hill – 9 receptions, 102 yards, TD
- NYJ – Garrett Wilson – 7 receptions, 44 yards, TD

The New York Jets matched up with the Miami Dolphins for the first ever NFL game played on Black Friday. With Tim Boyle starting at quarterback, the Jets' offensive struggles continued as Miami cruised to a 34–13 victory despite New York's defense intercepting Tua Tagovailoa twice, including once for a pick-six. Notably, after Tagovailoa's second interception, the Jets had a chance to take the lead going into halftime, but Boyle's Hail Mary pass attempt was intercepted by Dolphins safety Jevon Holland, who returned the pass 99 yards for a touchdown to add insult to injury. The embarrassing play, which some fans later nicknamed the "Hell Mary", happened nearly 11 years to the date of the Butt Fumble, which also took place around the Thanksgiving holiday.

==== Week 13: vs. Atlanta Falcons ====
Week 13: Atlanta Falcons at New York Jets – Game summary

Quarter	1	2	3	4	Total
**Falcons**	0	10	3	0	**13**
Jets	2	3	3	0	**8**

at MetLife Stadium, East Rutherford, New Jersey

- Date: December 3
- Game time: 1:00 p.m. EST
- Game weather: Cloudy, 50 °F (10 °C)
- Game attendance: 74,455
- Referee: Ronald Torbert
- TV announcers (Fox): Kenny Albert, Jonathan Vilma and Shannon Spake
- Recap, Game Book

Game information

**First quarter**

- NYJ – Bijan Robinson tackled in end zone for a safety, 1:36. Jets 2–0.

**Second quarter**

- ATL – MyCole Pruitt 20-yard pass from Desmond Ridder (Younghoe Koo kick), 10:04. Falcons 7–2. **Drive: 6 plays, 47 yards, 3:07.**
- NYJ – Greg Zuerlein 27-yard field goal, 3:56. Falcons 7–5. **Drive: 12 plays, 66 yards, 6:08.**
- ATL – Younghoe Koo 22-yard field goal, 0:00. Falcons 10–5. **Drive: 7 plays, 40 yards, 1:13.**

**Third quarter**

- NYJ – Greg Zuerlein 46-yard field goal, 10:32. Falcons 10–8. **Drive: 9 plays, 47 yards, 4:28.**
- ATL – Younghoe Koo 42-yard field goal, 3:38. Falcons 13–8. **Drive: 14 plays, 51 yards, 6:54.**

**Fourth quarter**

- No scoring plays.

**Top passers**

- ATL – Desmond Ridder – 12/27, 121 yards, TD
- NYJ – Tim Boyle – 14/25, 148 yards, INT

**Top rushers**

- ATL – Bijan Robinson – 18 rushes, 53 yards
- NYJ – Dalvin Cook – 9 rushes, 35 yards

**Top receivers**

- ATL – Kyle Pitts – 4 receptions, 51 yards
- NYJ – Breece Hall – 6 receptions, 29 yards

While the Jets took an early 2–0 lead due to a safety, the Falcons quickly scored a touchdown to make it 7–2 and never gave up the lead from there. Despite only allowing 194 yards to the Falcons, the Jets were held to 8 points in the loss. With the loss, the Jets were eliminated from AFC East contention.

==== Week 14: vs. Houston Texans ====
Week 14: Houston Texans at New York Jets – Game summary

Quarter	1	2	3	4	Total
Texans	0	0	6	0	**6**
**Jets**	0	0	14	16	**30**

at MetLife Stadium, East Rutherford, New Jersey

- Date: December 10
- Game time: 1:00 p.m. EST
- Game weather: Rain, 58 °F (14 °C)
- Game attendance: 72,956
- Referee: Brad Allen
- TV announcers (CBS): Kevin Harlan, Trent Green and Melanie Collins
- Recap, Game Book

Game information

**First quarter**

- No scoring plays.

**Second quarter**

- No scoring plays.

**Third quarter**

- NYJ – Randall Cobb 15-yard pass from Zach Wilson (Greg Zuerlein kick), 11:05. Jets 7–0. **Drive: 7 plays, 75 yards, 3:55.**
- NYJ – Xavier Gipson 9-yard run (Greg Zuerlein kick), 4:31. Jets 14–0. **Drive: 8 plays, 69 yards, 5:02.**
- HOU – Devin Singletary 1-yard run (kick failed), 0:00. Jets 14–6. **Drive: 4 plays, 57 yards, 1:20.**

**Fourth quarter**

- NYJ – Breece Hall 3-yard pass from Zach Wilson (Greg Zuerlein kick), 9:27. Jets 21–6. **Drive: 10 plays, 75 yards, 5:33.**
- NYJ – Greg Zuerlein 51-yard field goal, 6:51. Jets 24–6. **Drive: 4 plays, 2 yards, 1:20.**
- NYJ – Greg Zuerlein 55-yard field goal, 4:30. Jets 27–6. **Drive: 5 plays, 6 yards, 1:43.**
- NYJ – Greg Zuerlein 44-yard field goal, 1:08. Jets 30–6. **Drive: 4 plays, 1 yards, 2:10.**

**Top passers**

- HOU – C. J. Stroud – 10/23, 91 yards
- NYJ – Zach Wilson – 27/36, 301 yards, 2 TD

**Top rushers**

- HOU – Devin Singletary – 13 rushes, 65 yards, TD
- NYJ – Breece Hall – 10 rushes, 40 yards

**Top receivers**

- HOU – Brevin Jordan – 3 receptions, 35 yards
- NYJ – Garrett Wilson – 9 receptions, 108 yards

Following the win, Zach Wilson earned AFC Offensive Player of the week due to his 75% completion percentage, 2 touchdowns and 0 interceptions.

==== Week 15: at Miami Dolphins ====
Week 15: New York Jets at Miami Dolphins – Game summary

Quarter	1	2	3	4	Total
Jets	0	0	0	0	**0**
**Dolphins**	7	17	3	3	**30**

at Hard Rock Stadium, Miami Gardens, Florida

- Date: December 17
- Game time: 1:00 p.m. EST
- Game weather: Partly cloudy, 76 °F (24 °C)
- Game attendance: 65,967
- Referee: Brad Rogers
- TV announcers (CBS): Jim Nantz, Tony Romo and Tracy Wolfson
- Recap, Game Book

Game information

**First quarter**

- MIA – Raheem Mostert 2-yard run (Jason Sanders kick), 7:37. Dolphins 7–0. **Drive: 3 plays, 1 yard, 1:28.**

**Second quarter**

- MIA – Jason Sanders 37-yard field goal, 13:56. Dolphins 10–0. **Drive: 9 plays, 22 yards, 6:27.**
- MIA – Jaylen Waddle 60-yard pass from Tua Tagovailoa (Jason Sanders kick), 7:42. Dolphins 17–0. **Drive: 1 play, 60 yards, 0:09.**
- MIA – Raheem Mostert 1-yard run (Jason Sanders kick), 1:03. Dolphins 24–0. **Drive: 11 plays, 80 yards, 4:24.**

**Third quarter**

- MIA – Jason Sanders 27-yard field goal, 8:36. Dolphins 27–0. **Drive: 9 plays, 41 yards, 5:21.**

**Fourth quarter**

- MIA – Jason Sanders 35-yard field goal, 11:42. Dolphins 30–0. **Drive: 12 plays, 42 yards, 7:43.**

**Top passers**

- NYJ – Trevor Siemian – 14/36, 110 yards, 2 INT
- MIA – Tua Tagovailoa – 21/24, 224 yards, TD

**Top rushers**

- NYJ – Breece Hall – 6 rushes, 12 yards
- MIA – Raheem Mostert – 15 rushes, 42 yards, 2 TD

**Top receivers**

- NYJ – Tyler Conklin – 4 receptions, 18 yards
- MIA – Jaylen Waddle – 8 receptions, 142 yards, TD

The shutout loss to the Dolphins officially eliminated the Jets from the playoffs for the 13th consecutive year.

==== Week 16: vs. Washington Commanders ====
Week 16: Washington Commanders at New York Jets – Game summary

Quarter	1	2	3	4	Total
Commanders	0	7	7	14	**28**
**Jets**	17	10	0	3	**30**

at MetLife Stadium, East Rutherford, New Jersey

- Date: December 24
- Game time: 1:00 p.m. EST
- Game weather: Mostly cloudy, 47 °F (8 °C)
- Game attendance: 67,470
- Referee: Clay Martin
- TV announcers (CBS): Spero Dedes, Adam Archuleta and Aditi Kinkhabwala
- Recap, Game Book

Game information

**First quarter**

- NYJ – Greg Zuerlein 13-yard field goal, 13:00. Jets 3–0. **Drive: 5 plays, 17 yard, 1:50.**
- NYJ – Jason Brownlee 8-yard pass from Trevor Siemian (Greg Zuerlein kick), 11:26. Jets 10–0. **Drive: 3 plays, 9 yard, 0:29.**
- NYJ – Breece Hall 36-yard run (Greg Zuerlein kick), 9:37. Jets 17–0. **Drive: 2 plays, 42 yard, 0:41.**

**Second quarter**

- NYJ – Greg Zuerlein 27-yard field goal, 9:10. Jets 20–0. **Drive: 7 plays, 44 yard, 2:29.**
- WAS – Chris Rodriguez Jr. 12-yard run (Joey Slye kick), 6:38. Jets 20–7. **Drive: 1 plays, 12 yards, 0:10.**
- NYJ – Breece Hall 2-yard run (Greg Zuerlein kick), 1:35. Jets 27–7. **Drive: 11 plays, 71 yard, 5:03.**

**Third quarter**

- WAS – Logan Thomas 15-yard pass from Jacoby Brissett (Joey Slye kick), 3:26. Jets 27–14. **Drive: 6 plays, 29 yards, 3:17.**

**Fourth quarter**

- WAS – Chris Rodriguez Jr. 1-yard run (Joey Slye kick), 9:33. Jets 27–21. **Drive: 9 plays, 77 yards, 4:37.**
- WAS – Antonio Gibson 2-yard run (Joey Slye kick), 4:52. Commanders 28–27. **Drive: 6 plays, 83 yards, 3:03.**
- NYJ – Greg Zuerlein 54-yard field goal, 0:05. Jets 30–28. **Drive: 8 plays, 31 yards, 1:36.**

**Top passers**

- WAS – Sam Howell – 6/22, 56 yards, TD, 2 INT
- NYJ – Trevor Siemian – 27/49, 217 yards, TD, INT

**Top rushers**

- WAS – Chris Rodriguez Jr. – 10 rushes, 58 yards, 2 TD
- NYJ – Breece Hall – 20 rushes, 95 yards, 2 TD

**Top receivers**

- WAS – Logan Thomas – 5 receptions, 36 yards, TD
- NYJ – Breece Hall – 12 receptions, 96 yards

Although the Jets raced out to a 27–7 lead, the Commanders scored 21 unanswered points to take a 28–27 lead. However, Greg Zuerlein kicked a game winning field goal with 5 seconds left to preserve the Jets win.

==== Week 17: at Cleveland Browns ====
Week 17: New York Jets at Cleveland Browns – Game summary

Quarter	1	2	3	4	Total
Jets	7	10	0	3	**20**
**Browns**	20	14	0	3	**37**

at Cleveland Browns Stadium, Cleveland, Ohio

- Date: December 28
- Game time: 8:15 p.m. EST
- Game weather: Cloudy, 47 °F (8 °C)
- Game attendance: 67,919
- Referee: Alex Kemp
- TV announcers (WNYW/Prime Video): Al Michaels, Kirk Herbstreit and Kaylee Hartung
- Recap, Game Book

Game information

**First quarter**

- CLE – Jerome Ford 7-yard pass from Joe Flacco (Riley Patterson kick), 11:10. Browns 7–0. **Drive: 7 plays, 75 yards, 3:50.**
- NYJ – Breece Hall 21-yard pass from Trevor Siemian (Greg Zuerlein kick), 8:06. Tied 7–7. **Drive: 6 plays, 75 yards, 3:04.**
- CLE – Kareem Hunt 7-yard run (kick failed), 4:43. Browns 13–7. **Drive: 7 plays, 75 yards, 3:23.**
- CLE – Ronnie Hickman 30-yard interception return (Riley Patterson kick), 2:01. Browns 20–7.

**Second quarter**

- CLE – Elijah Moore 8-yard pass from Joe Flacco (Riley Patterson kick), 6:15. Browns 27–7. **Drive: 10 plays, 79 yards, 5:32.**
- NYJ – Jermaine Johnson 37-yard interception return (Greg Zuerlein kick), 2:02. Browns 27–14.
- CLE – Jerome Ford 50-yard pass from Joe Flacco (Riley Patterson kick), 1:25. Browns 34–14. **Drive: 3 plays, 75 yards, 0:37.**
- NYJ – Greg Zuerlein 46-yard field goal, 0:00. Browns 34–17. **Drive: 6 plays, 47 yards, 1:25.**

**Third quarter**

- No scoring plays.

**Fourth quarter**

- NYJ – Greg Zuerlein 44-yard field goal, 8:50. Browns 34–20. **Drive: 7 plays, 9 yards, 3:05.**
- CLE – Riley Patterson 33-yard field goal, 2:54. Browns 37–20. **Drive: 6 plays, 18 yards, 2:27.**

**Top passers**

- NYJ – Trevor Siemian – 32/45, 261 yards, TD, INT
- CLE – Joe Flacco – 19/29, 309 yards, 3 TD, INT

**Top rushers**

- NYJ – Breece Hall – 13 rushes, 84 yards
- CLE – Jerome Ford – 12 rushes, 64 yards

**Top receivers**

- NYJ – Garrett Wilson – 5 receptions, 50 yards
- CLE – David Njoku – 6 receptions, 134 yards

The Jets defense failed to contain QB Joe Flacco, who passed for 309 yards and 3 touchdowns as the Jets allowed the most points this season with 37.

==== Week 18: at New England Patriots ====
Week 18: New York Jets at New England Patriots – Game summary

Quarter	1	2	3	4	Total
**Jets**	3	3	0	11	**17**
Patriots	0	3	0	0	**3**

at Gillette Stadium, Foxborough, Massachusetts

- Date: January 7
- Game time: 1:00 p.m. EST
- Game weather: Snow, 33 °F (1 °C)
- Game attendance: 64,628
- Referee: Land Clark
- TV announcers (Fox): Chris Myers, Robert Smith and Jen Hale
- Recap, Game Book

Game information

**First quarter**

- NYJ – Greg Zuerlein 21-yard field goal, 2:04. Jets 3–0. **Drive: 10 plays, 35 yards, 5:16.**

**Second quarter**

- NE – Chad Ryland 30-yard field goal, 9:32. Tied 3–3. **Drive: 10 plays, 50 yards, 5:09.**
- NYJ – Greg Zuerlein 40-yard field goal, 6:07. Jets 6–3. **Drive: 8 plays, 56 yards, 3:25.**

**Third quarter**

- No scoring plays.

**Fourth quarter**

- NYJ – Greg Zuerlein 33-yard field goal, 8:08. Jets 9–3. **Drive: 8 plays, 30 yards, 4:09.**
- NYJ – Breece Hall 50-yard run (Breece Hall run), 1:47. Jets 17–3. **Drive: 2 plays, 53 yards, 0:16.**

**Top passers**

- NYJ – Trevor Siemian – 8/20, 70 yards
- NE – Bailey Zappe – 12/30, 88 yards, 2 INT

**Top rushers**

- NYJ – Breece Hall – 37 rushes, 178 yards, TD
- NE – Ezekiel Elliott – 13 rushes, 54 yards

**Top receivers**

- NYJ – Garrett Wilson – 2 receptions, 34 yards
- NE – Ezekiel Elliott – 5 receptions, 27 yards

The Jets finally ended a 15-game losing streak to the Patriots with their win, also finishing the season at 7–10 for the second consecutive season. More significantly, they won what turned out to be their last match ever against the Bill Belichick-led Patriots, as Belichick would part ways with the Patriots just four days later.

=== Standings ===
==== Division ====
AFC East
	W	L	T	PCT	DIV	CONF	PF	PA	STK
^{(2)} Buffalo Bills	11	6	0	.647	4–2	7–5	451	311	W5
^{(6)} Miami Dolphins	11	6	0	.647	4–2	7–5	496	391	L2
New York Jets	7	10	0	.412	2–4	4–8	268	355	W1
New England Patriots	4	13	0	.235	2–4	4–8	236	366	L2

==== Conference ====
AFC
#	Team	Division	W	L	T	PCT	DIV	CONF	SOS	SOV	STK
**Division leaders**
1	Baltimore Ravens	North	13	4	0	.765	3–3	8–4	.543	.529	L1
2 (Note: Buffalo claimed the No. 2 seed over Kansas City based on head-to-head victory.) (Note: Buffalo finished ahead of Miami in the AFC East based on head-to-head sweep.)	Buffalo Bills	East	11	6	0	.647	4–2	7–5	.471	.471	W5
3	Kansas City Chiefs	West	11	6	0	.647	4–2	9–3	.481	.428	W2
4	Houston Texans	South	10	7	0	.588	4–2	7–5	.474	.465	W2
**Wild cards**
5 (Note: Cleveland claimed the No. 5 seed over Miami based on conference record.)	Cleveland Browns	North	11	6	0	.647	3–3	8–4	.536	.513	L1
6	Miami Dolphins	East	11	6	0	.647	4–2	7–5	.450	.358	L2
7	Pittsburgh Steelers	North	10	7	0	.588	5–1	7–5	.540	.571	W3
**Did not qualify for the postseason**
8 (Note: Cincinnati finished ahead of Jacksonville based on head-to-head victory. Division tie break was initially used to eliminate Indianapolis (see below).)	Cincinnati Bengals	North	9	8	0	.529	1–5	4–8	.574	.536	W1
9 (Note: Jacksonville finished ahead of Indianapolis based on head-to-head sweep.)	Jacksonville Jaguars	South	9	8	0	.529	4–2	6–6	.533	.477	L1
10	Indianapolis Colts	South	9	8	0	.529	3–3	7–5	.491	.444	L1
11 (Note: Las Vegas finished ahead of Denver based on head-to-head sweep.)	Las Vegas Raiders	West	8	9	0	.471	4–2	6–6	.488	.426	W1
12	Denver Broncos	West	8	9	0	.471	3–3	5–7	.488	.485	L1
13	New York Jets	East	7	10	0	.412	2–4	4–8	.502	.454	W1
14	Tennessee Titans	South	6	11	0	.353	1–5	4–8	.522	.422	W1
15	Los Angeles Chargers	West	5	12	0	.294	1–5	3–9	.529	.388	L5
16	New England Patriots	East	4	13	0	.235	2–4	4–8	.522	.529	L2
**Tiebreakers** (Note: When breaking ties for three or more teams under the NFL's rules, they are first broken within divisions, then comparing only the highest ranked remaining team from each division.)
