= Xavier Gipson =

American football player (born 2001)

No. 80 – New York Giants
- Position: Wide receiver
- Roster status: Active

Personal information
- Born: March 8, 2001 (age 25); Dallas, Texas, U.S.
- Listed height: 5 ft 9 in (1.75 m)
- Listed weight: 189 lb (86 kg)

Career information
- High school: Woodrow Wilson (Dallas)
- College: Stephen F. Austin (2019–2022)
- NFL draft: 2023: undrafted

Career history
- New York Jets (2023–2025); New York Giants (2025); Philadelphia Eagles (2025); New York Giants (2025–2026)*; Philadelphia Eagles (2026)*; New York Giants (2026–present)
- * Offseason or practice squad member only

Awards and highlights
- 2× WAC Offensive Player of the Year (2021, 2022); 2× First-team All-WAC (2021, 2022); First-team All-Southland (2020); Second-team All-Southland (2019)

Career NFL statistics as of 2025
- Receptions: 29
- Receiving yards: 274
- Receiving touchdowns: 1
- Rushing yards: 73
- Rushing touchdowns: 1
- Return yards: 1,990
- Return touchdowns: 1
- Stats at Pro Football Reference

Xavier Jamar Gipson (born March 8, 2001) is an American professional football wide receiver for the New York Giants of the National Football League (NFL). He played college football for the Stephen F. Austin Lumberjacks, and was signed to the New York Jets after going unselected in the 2023 NFL draft.

== Early life ==
Gipson grew up in Dallas, Texas and attended Woodrow Wilson High School. He was a four-year starter on the football team at cornerback and also began playing wide receiver during his senior season. Gipson initially committed to play college football at Southern Methodist University as a cornerback. He later flipped his commitment to Stephen F. Austin State University (SFA), who recruited him to play on offense.

== College career ==
Gipson played college football for the Stephen F. Austin Lumberjacks for four seasons. He caught 52 passes for 934 yards and seven touchdowns and was named second-team All-Southland Conference during his freshman season. Gipson was named first-team All-Southland after finishing his sophomore season with 52 receptions for 841 yards and nine touchdowns. He was named the Offensive Player of the Year of the Western Athletic Conference (WAC), SFA's new conference, after catching 74 passes for 1,367 yards and 14 touchdowns as a junior. Gipson repeated as the WAC Offensive Player of the Year as a senior.

== Professional career ==
Pre-draft measurables
Height	Weight	Arm length	Hand span	Wingspan	40-yard dash	10-yard split	20-yard split	20-yard shuttle	Three-cone drill	Vertical jump	Broad jump	Bench press
5 ft 9 1/2 in (1.77 m)	189 lb (86 kg)	30 1/8 in (0.77 m)	8 1/8 in (0.21 m)	5 ft 10 5/8 in (1.79 m)	4.42 s	1.46 s	2.58 s	4.07 s	6.88 s	34.5 in (0.88 m)	9 ft 10 in (3.00 m)	14 reps
All values from Pro Day

=== New York Jets ===
The New York Jets signed Gipson as an undrafted free agent on May 5, 2023. In his NFL debut, a Week 1 Monday Night Football matchup against the Buffalo Bills, he returned a punt 65 yards in overtime to score the game-winning touchdown. The NFL later named him AFC Special Teams Player of the Week. In Week 14 against the Houston Texans, he had a rushing touchdown in the 30–6 victory. In the 2023 season, Gipson had 21 receptions for 229 receiving yards, one rushing touchdown, and handled most of the kick and punt return duties.

In Week 8 of the 2024 season, Gipson scored his first NFL receiving touchdown against the New England Patriots.

In Week 1 of the 2025 season, Gipson fumbled a kickoff in the fourth quarter, which was recovered by the Pittsburgh Steelers and led to a touchdown two plays later, in the 32–34 loss. On September 10, Gipson was waived by the Jets.

=== New York Giants ===
On September 11, 2025, Gipson was claimed off waivers by the New York Giants. He was waived by New York on September 20.

=== Philadelphia Eagles (first stint) ===
On September 22, 2025, Gipson was claimed off waivers by the Philadelphia Eagles. He was waived by the Eagles on December 7.

=== New York Giants (second stint) ===
On December 10, 2025, Gipson signed with the New York Giants' practice squad. He was promoted to the active roster on January 3, 2026. On August 30, Gipson was waived by the Giants as a part of final roster cuts.

=== Philadelphia Eagles (second stint) ===
On September 11, 2026, Gipson was signed to the Philadelphia Eagles' practice squad.

=== New York Giants (third stint) ===
On November 16, 2026, Gipson was signed by the New York Giants to their active roster from the Philadelphia Eagles' practice squad.

== NFL career statistics ==
Legend
**Bold**	Career high

=== Regular season ===
Year	Team	Games		Receiving						Rushing					Punt returns					Kickoff returns					Fumbles	
Year	Team	GP	GS	Tgts	Rec	Yds	Avg	Lng	TD	Att	Yds	Avg	Lng	TD	Ret	Yds	Avg	Lng	TD	Ret	Yds	Avg	Lng	TD	Fum	Lost
2023	NYJ	**17**	**3**	**38**	**21**	**229**	**10.9**	**36**	0	**8**	**68**	**8.5**	**18**	**1**	**33**	**319**	9.7	**65**	**1**	**22**	**511**	23.2	34	0	**5**	**2**
2024	NYJ	11	0	9	5	40	8.0	17	**1**	0	0	0	0	0	25	230	9.2	40	0	9	235	26.2	33	0	2	0
2025	NYJ	1	0	0	0	0	0	0	0	0	0	0	0	0	2	19	9.5	19	0	5	142	**28.4**	**40**	0	1	1
2025	PHI	5	0	2	2	6	3	3	0	0	0	0	0	0	6	67	**11.2**	18	0	7	177	25.3	37	0	2	1
Career		33	3	47	28	275	9.4	36	1	8	68	8.5	18	1	66	635	9.1	65	1	43	1319	25.9	40	0	10	4
