= Jimmy Ciarlo =

American football player (born 2001)

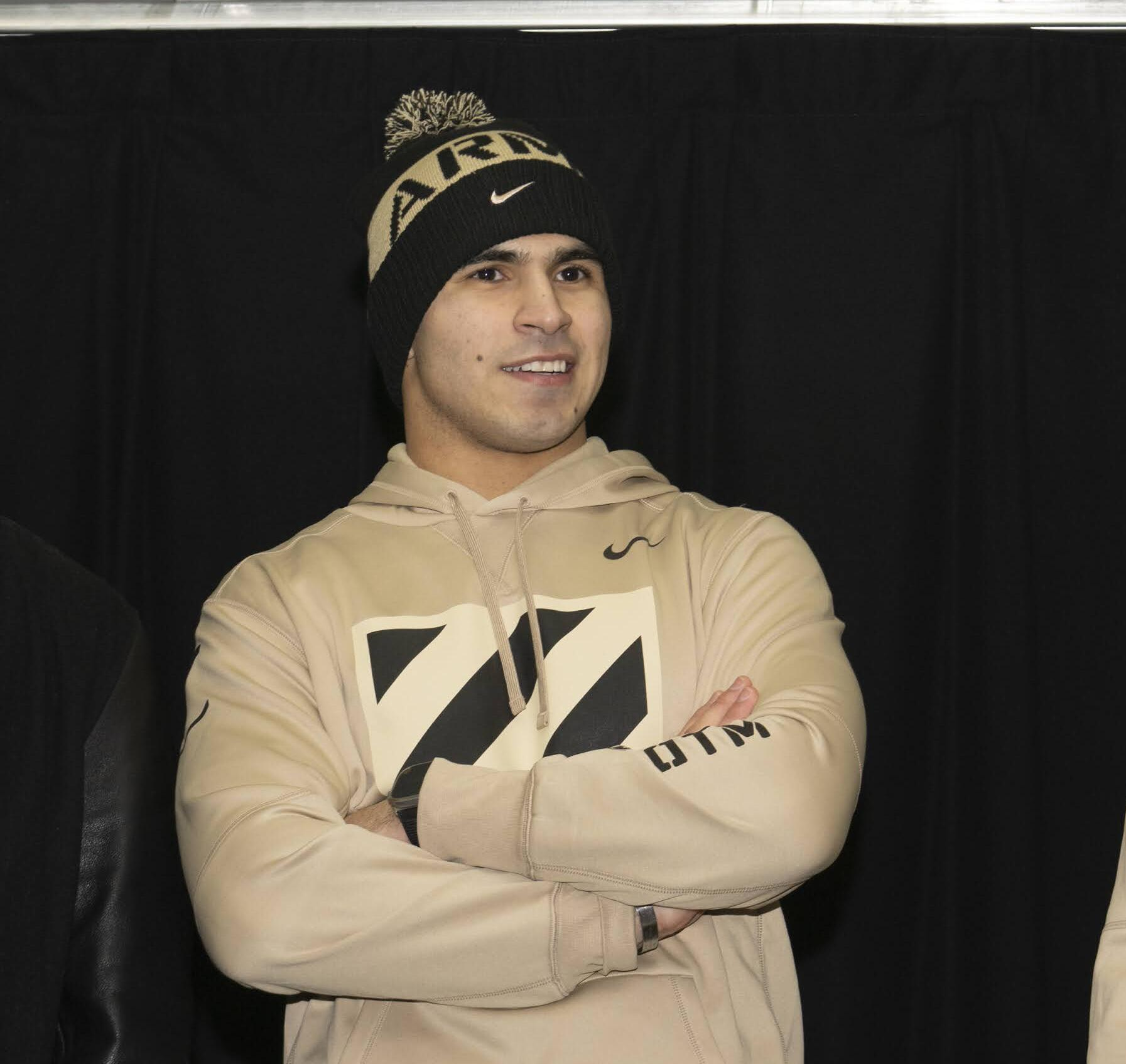
- Ciarlo with the Army Black Knights in 2023

No. 48 – Tennessee Titans
- Position: Linebacker
- Roster status: Practice squad

Personal information
- Born: February 28, 2001 (age 25); Ringwood, New Jersey, U.S.
- Listed height: 6 ft 2 in (1.88 m)
- Listed weight: 229 lb (104 kg)

Career information
- High school: Saint Joseph Regional (Montvale, New Jersey); United States Military Academy Preparatory School (West Point, New York)
- College: Army (2020–2023)
- NFL draft: 2024: undrafted

Career history
- New York Jets (2024)*; Buffalo Bills (2025); Miami Dolphins (2025)*; Buffalo Bills (2026)*; Tennessee Titans (2026)*; Seattle Seahawks (2026)*; Tennessee Titans (2026–present)*
- * Offseason or practice squad member only

Career NFL statistics as of 2025
- Games played: 1
- Stats at Pro Football Reference

Jimmy Ciarlo (born February 28, 2001) is an American professional football linebacker for the Tennessee Titans of the National Football League (NFL). He played college football for the Army Black Knights and was signed by the New York Jets as an undrafted free agent in 2024.

== Early life ==
Ciarlo was born on February 28, 2001, in Ringwood, New Jersey. He attended Saint Joseph Regional High School in Montvale, where he played football as a wide receiver and cornerback. On defense, he totaled over 50 pass breakups and seven interceptions at Saint Joseph. Ciarlo received little attention as a college recruit and signed to play college football for the Army Black Knights, as several of his family members served in the military. He attended the United States Military Academy Preparatory School in 2019.

== College career ==
Ciarlo attended Army from 2020 to 2023 and majored in systems and decision sciences. As a freshman in 2020, he appeared in four games. He then appeared in four games in 2021 and posted four tackles and a pass breakup. Ciarlo became a starting linebacker in the 2022 season and started all 12 games, totaling 55 tackles, 3.5 tackles-for-loss (TFLs) and two passes defended. He was elected team captain as a senior in 2023 and posted 58 tackles and three sacks while starting all 12 games. That year, he chose to serve in the Infantry Branch of the United States Army after his playing career.

== Professional career ==
Pre-draft measurables
Height	Weight	Arm length	Hand span	Wingspan	40-yard dash	10-yard split	20-yard split	20-yard shuttle	Three-cone drill	Vertical jump	Broad jump	Bench press
6 ft 0 5/8 in (1.84 m)	229 lb (104 kg)	31 7/8 in (0.81 m)	9 in (0.23 m)	6 ft 4 in (1.93 m)	4.65 s	1.60 s	2.66 s	4.35 s	6.97 s	36.0 in (0.91 m)	10 ft 0 in (3.05 m)	34 reps
All values from Pro Day

=== New York Jets ===
After going unselected in the 2024 NFL draft, Ciarlo signed with the New York Jets as an undrafted free agent. However, he suffered a torn ACL four plays into his preseason debut with the Jets. He was waived/injured on August 11, 2024, then spent the entire 2024 season on injured reserve. He was released by the Jets on May 8, 2025.

=== Buffalo Bills (first stint) ===
After being released by the Jets, Ciarlo had tryouts with the New England Patriots and New York Giants, but was not signed. While contemplating whether to report to the infantry, he was contacted by the Buffalo Bills and offered a tryout. He signed with the Bills on August 6, 2025. Four days later, he appeared in the team's preseason game against the New York Giants and posted four tackles. Ciarlo was praised for his performance by head coach Sean McDermott, which was featured on the reality series Hard Knocks. He posted four more tackles in the second preseason game. Ciarlo was released by the team on August 26 as a part of final cuts, then was signed to the practice squad the next day. Ciarlo was signed to the active roster on October 4, then made his NFL debut the next day against the New England Patriots. He was released on October 14 and re-signed to the practice squad two days later. Ciarlo was released on November 4.

=== Miami Dolphins ===
On November 25, 2025, Ciarlo signed with the Miami Dolphins' practice squad.

=== Buffalo Bills (second stint) ===
On January 19, 2026, Ciarlo signed a reserve/futures contract with the Buffalo Bills. He was waived by the Bills on August 30 as a part of final roster cuts.

=== Tennessee Titans (first stint) ===
On September 15, 2026, Ciarlo was signed to the Tennessee Titans' practice squad. On September 22, he was waived by the Titans.

=== Seattle Seahawks ===
On September 30, 2026, Ciarlo signed with the Seattle Seahawks practice squad. On November 4, he was released.

=== Tennessee Titans (second stint) ===
On November 9, 2026, Ciarlo was signed to the Tennessee Titans practice squad.
