= Zaire Barnes =

American football player (born 1999)

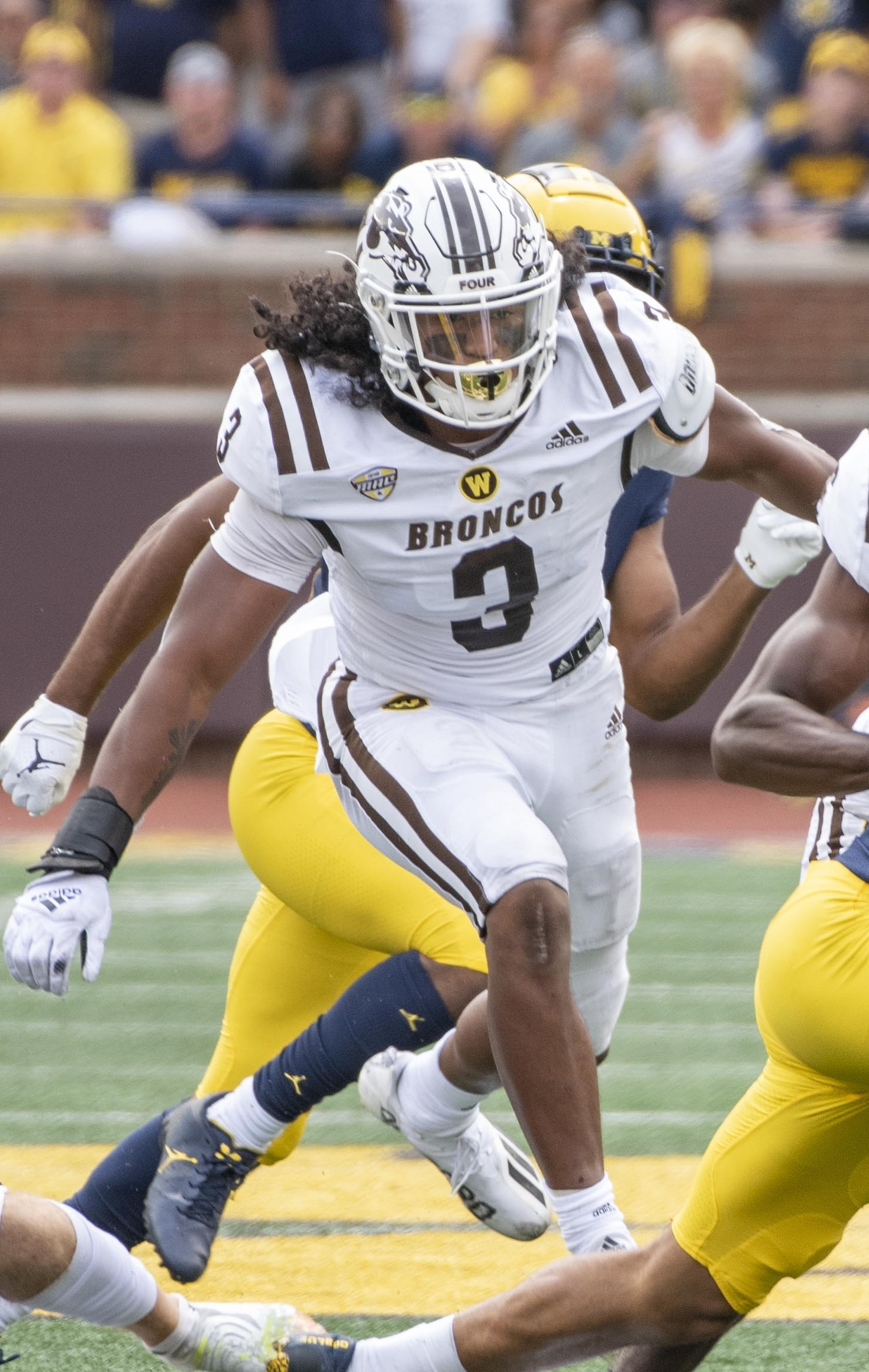
- Barnes with the Western Michigan Broncos in 2021

No. 46 – New York Giants
- Position: Linebacker
- Roster status: Active

Personal information
- Born: September 3, 1999 (age 27); Mundelein, Illinois, U.S.
- Listed height: 6 ft 1 in (1.85 m)
- Listed weight: 232 lb (105 kg)

Career information
- High school: Carmel Catholic (Mundelein)
- College: Western Michigan (2018–2022)
- NFL draft: 2023: 6th round, 184th overall pick

Career history
- New York Jets (2023–2024); New York Giants (2025–present)

Awards and highlights
- First-team All-MAC (2022); Second-team All-MAC (2021)

Career NFL statistics as of 2025
- Total tackles: 29
- Sacks: 1
- Stats at Pro Football Reference

Zaire Barnes (born September 3, 1999) is an American professional football linebacker for the New York Giants of the National Football League (NFL). He played college football for the Western Michigan Broncos.

== College career ==
A three-star recruit according to 247Sports, Barnes committed to play college football for the Western Michigan Broncos on June 18, 2017, over offers from Bowling Green, Central Michigan, and Cincinnati.

== Professional career ==
Pre-draft measurables
Height	Weight	Arm length	Hand span	Wingspan	40-yard dash	10-yard split	20-yard split	20-yard shuttle	Three-cone drill	Vertical jump	Broad jump	Bench press
6 ft 1 5/8 in (1.87 m)	232 lb (105 kg)	32 in (0.81 m)	9 in (0.23 m)	6 ft 4 3/8 in (1.94 m)	4.56 s	1.57 s	2.63 s	4.27 s	7.02 s	34.0 in (0.86 m)	10 ft 3 in (3.12 m)	20 reps
All values from Pro Day

=== New York Jets ===
Barnes was selected 184th overall by the New York Jets in the sixth round of the 2023 NFL draft. On May 5, he signed a four-year contract with the Jets. In the 2023 season, he appeared in four games.

Barnes was placed on injured reserve on September 9, 2024.

Barnes was waived by the Jets on August 27, 2025.

=== New York Giants ===
On August 29, 2025, Barnes was signed to the New York Giants' practice squad. On October 18, Barnes was elevated from the practice squad to the active roster prior to the Giants’ Week 7 matchup against the Denver Broncos. On November 8, he was signed to the active roster.

On March 14, 2026, Barnes re-signed with the Giants on a one-year contract.

== Personal life ==
Barnes is of Filipino and African American descent.
