= 2025 New York Jets season =

66th season in franchise history; 56th in the NFL

- Owner: Woody and Christopher Johnson
- General manager: Darren Mougey
- Head coach: Aaron Glenn
- Home stadium: MetLife Stadium

Results
- Record: 3–14
- Division place: 4th AFC East
- Playoffs: Did not qualify
- Pro Bowlers: None

Uniform
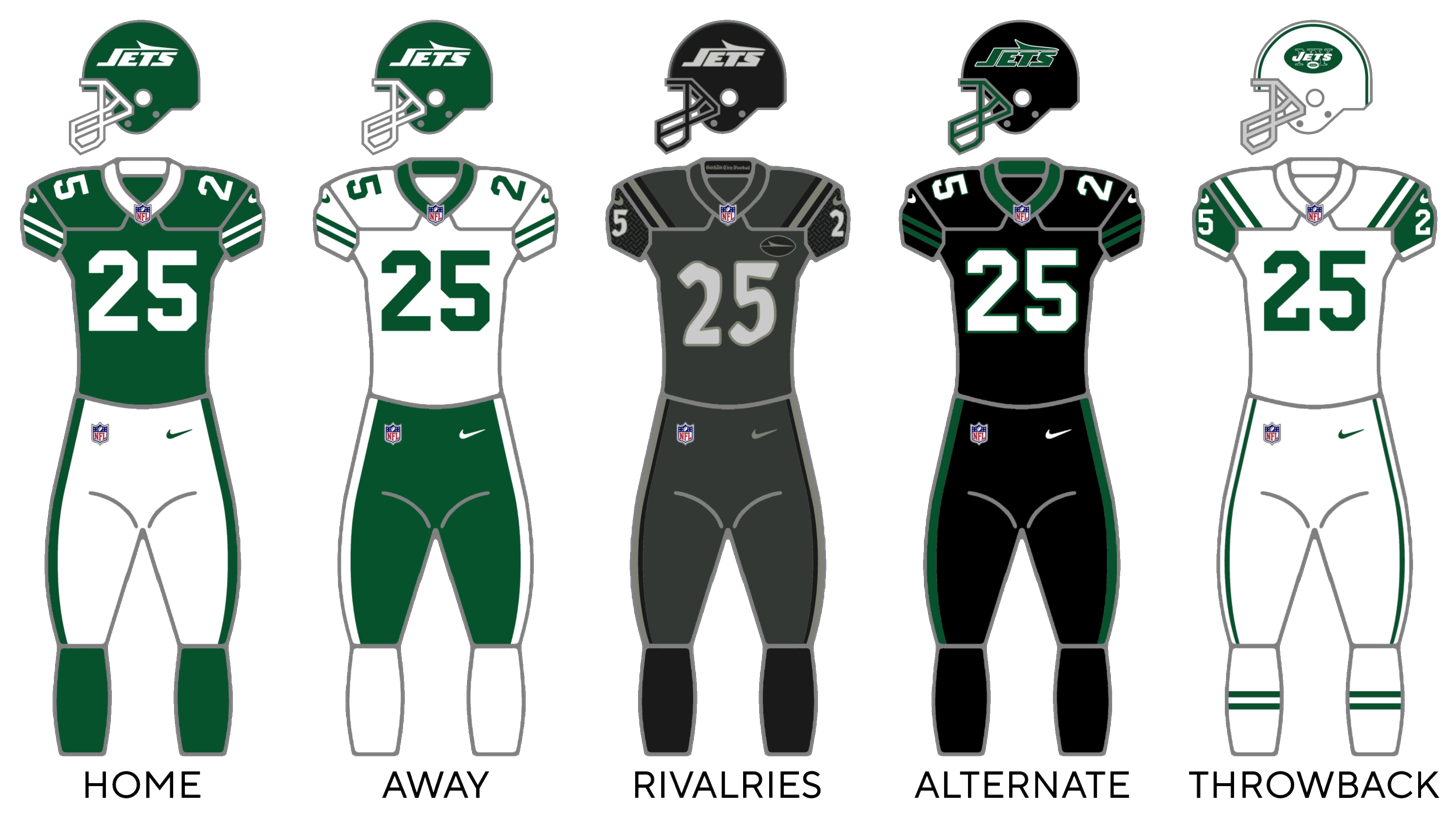

The 2025 season was the New York Jets' 56th in the National Football League (NFL), their 66th overall and their first under general manager Darren Mougey and head coach Aaron Glenn. This season began with the team's fourth head coach in eight seasons.

The team failed to improve on their 5–12 record from the previous season following a 29–6 blowout loss to the New Orleans Saints in Week 16 and instead went 3–14 for their worst season since 2020. The Jets were the last winless team in the NFL, losing their first seven games before earning their first victory against the Cincinnati Bengals in Week 8. This season began with the team's fifth quarterback starting on opening day in six seasons. The Jets clinched their 10th consecutive losing season after a 23–10 loss on the road to the Baltimore Ravens. New York was also eliminated from playoff contention for the 15th straight year after a Week 14 blowout loss to their division rival Miami Dolphins while also clinching the franchise's sixth consecutive season with ten losses or more and got swept by their division rivals for the third time in six seasons. The Jets forced a mere 4 opponent turnovers in the entire season, the lowest of any NFL team since the AFL-NFL merger, breaking the previous record of 7 set by the 2018 San Francisco 49ers. The Jets also infamously became the first team in NFL history to not record an interception in an entire season since the NFL began tracking them in 1933, as all four of their forced turnovers were fumble recoveries. The Jets' −203 point differential was their worst since they got outscored 457–243 in 2020. The Jets got outscored by 107 points in December, which is an NFL record, breaking the record previously set by the 2016 team, who got outscored by 84 in December. They also finished last place in the AFC East for the first time since 2022.

After the Buffalo Sabres of the NHL clinched a playoff berth for the first time since 2011, the Jets officially hold sole possession of the longest active playoff appearance drought in the four major sports leagues.

On November 4, 2025, the Jets traded away All-Pro cornerback Sauce Gardner to the Indianapolis Colts and All-Pro defensive tackle Quinnen Williams to the Dallas Cowboys for multiple first and second round selections.

For the first time since 2021, not a single Jet made the Pro Bowl. The Jets had a four-year aggregate record of 22–46 (.324) from 2022 to 2025, the worst four-year stretch for the franchise since they went 20–47 (.299) from 2020 to 2023.

The New York Jets drew an average home attendance of 73,666, the 5th-highest of all NFL teams.

== Trades ==
Date	Player(s)/Asset(s) received	Team	Player(s)/Asset(s) traded
November 7	WR Adonai Mitchell; 2026 1st round selection 2027 1st round selection	Indianapolis Colts	CB Sauce Gardner
November 7	DT Mazi Smith; 2026 2nd round selection 2027 1st round selection (Note: New York will receive the earlier of Dallas' or Green Bay's selections)	Dallas Cowboys	DT Quinnen Williams

== Draft ==
2025 New York Jets draft selections
Round	Selection	Player	Position	College	Notes
1	7	Armand Membou	OT	Missouri	
2	42	Mason Taylor	TE	LSU	
3	73	Azareye'h Thomas	CB	Florida State	
3	92	Traded to the Las Vegas Raiders (Note: The Jets traded a conditional third-round selection (92nd overall) to the Las Vegas Raiders in exchange for WR Davante Adams. The condition – that Las Vegas would receive a second-round pick in 2025 if Adams was named to the 2024 All-Pro Team during the 2024 NFL season or the Jets reached the AFC Championship Game or Super Bowl LIX with Adams on the active roster – was not met when the Jets missed the 2024-25 NFL playoffs and Adams was not named to the 2024 All-Pro Team. Had any of the conditions converted, the Raiders would have received a second-round selection (42nd overall) instead.)			From Lions (Note: The Jets traded a 2024 fourth-round selection (126th overall) to the Detroit Lions in exchange for a third-round selection (92nd overall).)
4	110	Arian Smith	WR	Georgia	
4	130	Malachi Moore	S	Alabama	From Philadelphia
5	145	Traded to the Philadelphia Eagles			
5	162	Francisco Mauigoa	LB	Miami	From Rams via Steelers (Note: The Jets traded WR Mike Williams to the Pittsburgh Steelers in exchange for a fifth-round selection (162nd overall).)
5	176	Tyler Baron	DE	Miami	From Baltimore
6	186	Traded to the Baltimore Ravens			
6	207	Traded to the Philadelphia Eagles			From Chiefs (Note: The Jets traded a seventh-round selection (225th overall) and WR Mecole Hardman to the Kansas City Chiefs in exchange for a sixth-round selection (207th overall).)
7	225	Traded to the Kansas City Chiefs			

2025 New York Jets undrafted free agents
Name	Position	College	Ref.
Jared Bartlett	LB	Cincinnati	
Dean Clark	DB	Fresno State	
Jordan Clark	DB	Notre Dame	
Brady Cook	QB	Missouri	
Caden Davis	K	Ole Miss	
Donovan Edwards	RB	Michigan	
Gus Hartwig	C	Purdue	
Dymere Miller	WR	Rutgers	
Fatorma Mulbah	DT	West Virginia	
Payton Page	DT	Clemson	
Jamaal Pritchett	WR	South Alabama	
Quentin Skinner	WR	Kansas	
Aaron Smith	LB	South Carolina State	
Ja'Markis Weston	LB	Florida	
Leander Wiegand	G	N/A*	
Kai Kroeger	P	South Carolina	
Lawrance Toafili	RB	Florida State	

* Signed from Germany as part of the International Player Pathway Program

Draft trades

== Staff ==
2025 New York Jets staff
Front office: Owner/chairman/CEO – Woody Johnson; Vice chairman – Christopher Johnson; President – Hymie Elhai; Executive vice president/COO – Brian Friedman; General manager – Darren Mougey; Senior director of football operations – Dan Zbojovsky; Senior director of football administration – Nick Sabella; Senior personnel/special projects – Jon Carr; Director of player personnel – Robbie Paton; Director of pro scouting – Evan Ardoin; Director of college scouting – Jay Mandolesi; Director, football analytics and strategy – Sean Clement; Player personnel research and analytics - Brian Shields; Senior football advisor – Rick Spielman; Senior scout/special projects - TJ McCreight; Consultant - Phil Savage; Head coaches: Head coach – Aaron Glenn; Offensive coaches: Offensive coordinator – Tanner Engstrand; Quarterbacks – Charles London; Running backs – Nic McKissic-Luke; Wide receivers – Shawn Jefferson; Tight ends – Jeff Blasko; Offensive line – Steve Heiden; Assistant offensive line – Brian Natkin; Senior assistant/pass game coordinator – Scott Turner; Offensive assistant – Walter Kusmirek; Offensive assistant – Junior Taylor	Defensive coaches: Interim defensive coordinator/defensive backs/pass game coordinator – Chris Harris; Defensive line – Eric Washington; Assistant defensive line – Cameron Davis; Linebackers – Aaron Curry; Assistant linebackers – Nathaniel Willingham; Assistant defensive backs – Dré Bly; Defensive assistant/nickel – Alonso Escalante; Defensive assistant – Roosevelt Williams; Special teams coaches: Special teams coordinator – Chris Banjo; Special teams assistant – Kevin O'Dea; Game management – Jon Berger; Strength and conditioning: Head strength and conditioning – Corey Smith; Assistant strength and conditioning – Brian Johnson; Assistant strength and conditioning – Thomas Myslinski

== Final roster ==
2025 New York Jets roster
Quarterbacks (QB): 4 Brady Cook; 1 Hendon Hooker; 2 Tyrod Taylor; Running backs (RB): 47 Andrew Beck FB; 20 Breece Hall; 31 Khalil Herbert; 34 Kene Nwangwu; Wide receivers (WR): 16 Tyler Johnson; 3 John Metchie III; 15 Adonai Mitchell; 88 Quentin Skinner; 82 Arian Smith; 18 Isaiah Williams; Tight ends (TE): 89 Jeremy Ruckert; 84 Stone Smartt; 86 Jelani Woods	Offensive linemen (OL): 74 Olu Fashanu LT; 77 Marquis Hayes G; 60 Kohl Levao RG; 70 Armand Membou RT; 61 Max Mitchell LT; 71 Josh Myers C; 79 Chukwuma Okorafor RT; 76 John Simpson LG; 66 Joe Tippmann RG; Defensive linemen (DL): 91 Jowon Briggs DT; 72 Micheal Clemons DE; 11 Jermaine Johnson II DE; 57 Kingsley Jonathan DE; 55 Braiden McGregor DE; 69 Payton Page DT; 97 Harrison Phillips DT; 99 Khalen Saunders DT; 98 Mazi Smith DT; 78 Jay Tufele DT; 58 Eric Watts DE	Linebackers (LB): 43 Cam Jones OLB; 45 Kobe King MLB; 44 Jamien Sherwood MLB; 53 Mykal Walker OLB; 56 Quincy Williams OLB; Defensive backs (DB): 30 Tre Brown CB; 35 Dean Clark SS; 33 Jordan Clark CB; 25 Jarius Monroe S; 27 Malachi Moore FS; 17 Chris Smith II S; 46 Keidron Smith FS; 21 Brandon Stephens CB; 37 Qwan'tez Stiggers CB; 36 Ja'Sir Taylor CB; Special teams (ST): 6 Nick Folk K; 42 Thomas Hennessy LS; 14 Austin McNamara P	Practice squad: 50 Liam Fornadel G; 81 Jamaal Pritchett WR; Reserve: 22 Tony Adams SS (IR); 0 Braelon Allen RB (IR); 94 Tyler Baron DE (IR); 17 Kris Boyd CB (IR); 29 Jarvis Brownlee Jr. CB (IR); 19 Irvin Charles WR (PUP); 8 Andre Cisco FS (IR); 7 Justin Fields QB (IR); 63 Gus Hartwig C (IR); 51 Francisco Mauigoa OLB (IR); 41 Marcelino McCrary-Ball OLB (IR); 9 Will McDonald IV DE (IR); 65 Xavier Newman-Johnson LG (IR); 26 Isaiah Oliver SS (IR); 83 Josh Reynolds WR (IR); 85 Mason Taylor TE (IR); 23 Azareye'h Thomas CB (IR); 5 Garrett Wilson WR (IR); 75 Alijah Vera-Tucker RG (IR); Rookies in italics

== Preseason ==
Week	Date	Opponent	Result	Record	Venue	Recap
1	August 9	at Green Bay Packers	W 30–10	1–0	Lambeau Field	Recap
2	August 16	at New York Giants	L 12–31	1–1	MetLife Stadium	Recap
3	August 22	Philadelphia Eagles	L 17–19	1–2	MetLife Stadium	Recap

== Regular season ==
=== Schedule ===
Week	Date	Opponent	Result	Record	Venue	Recap
1	September 7	Pittsburgh Steelers	**L** 32–34	0–1	MetLife Stadium	Recap
2	September 14	**Buffalo Bills**	**L** 10–30	0–2	MetLife Stadium	Recap
3	September 21	at Tampa Bay Buccaneers	**L** 27–29	0–3	Raymond James Stadium	Recap
4	September 29	at **Miami Dolphins**	**L** 21–27	0–4	Hard Rock Stadium	Recap
5	October 5	Dallas Cowboys	**L** 22–37	0–5	MetLife Stadium	Recap
6	October 12	Denver Broncos	**L** 11–13	0–6	(United Kingdom) Tottenham Hotspur Stadium (London)	Recap
7	October 19	Carolina Panthers	**L** 6–13	0–7	MetLife Stadium	Recap
8	October 26	at Cincinnati Bengals	**W** 39–38	1–7	Paycor Stadium	Recap
9	Bye					
10	November 9	Cleveland Browns	**W** 27–20	2–7	MetLife Stadium	Recap
11	November 13	at **New England Patriots**	**L** 14–27	2–8	Gillette Stadium	Recap
12	November 23	at Baltimore Ravens	**L** 10–23	2–9	M&T Bank Stadium	Recap
13	November 30	Atlanta Falcons	**W** 27–24	3–9	MetLife Stadium	Recap
14	December 7	**Miami Dolphins**	**L** 10–34	3–10	MetLife Stadium	Recap
15	December 14	at Jacksonville Jaguars	**L** 20–48	3–11	EverBank Stadium	Recap
16	December 21	at New Orleans Saints	**L** 6–29	3–12	Caesars Superdome	Recap
17	December 28	**New England Patriots**	**L** 10–42	3–13	MetLife Stadium	Recap
18	January 4	at **Buffalo Bills**	**L** 8–35	3–14	Highmark Stadium	Recap

Note: Intra-division opponents are in bold text.

=== Game summaries ===
==== Week 1: vs. Pittsburgh Steelers ====
Week 1: Pittsburgh Steelers at New York Jets – Game summary

Quarter	1	2	3	4	Total
**Steelers**	7	10	0	17	**34**
Jets	9	10	7	6	**32**

at MetLife Stadium, East Rutherford, New Jersey

- Date: September 7
- Game time: 1:00 p.m. EDT
- Game weather: Cloudy, 67 °F (19 °C)
- Game attendance: 83,253
- Referee: Bill Vinovich
- TV announcers (CBS): Ian Eagle, J. J. Watt and Evan Washburn
- Recap, Game Book

Game information

**First quarter**

- NYJ – Nick Folk 35-yard field goal, 9:15. Jets 3–0. **Drive: 10 plays, 48 yards, 5:45.**
- PIT – Ben Skowronek 22-yard pass from Aaron Rodgers (Chris Boswell kick), 3:38. Steelers 7–3. **Drive: 10 plays, 71 yards, 5:37.**
- NYJ – Garrett Wilson 33-yard pass from Justin Fields (run failed), 0:25. Jets 9–7. **Drive: 6 plays, 55 yards, 3:13.**

**Second quarter**

- PIT – Chris Boswell 56-yard field goal, 13:26. Steelers 10–9. **Drive: 5 plays, 35 yards, 1:59.**
- NYJ – Braelon Allen 8-yard run (Nick Folk kick), 10:03. Jets 16–10. **Drive: 7 plays, 68 yards, 3:23.**
- NYJ – Nick Folk 51-yard field goal, 2:54. Jets 19–10. **Drive: 8 plays, 41 yards, 4:53.**
- PIT – Jonnu Smith 3-yard pass from Aaron Rodgers (Chris Boswell kick), 0:32. Jets 19–17. **Drive: 9 plays, 65 yards, 2:22.**

**Third quarter**

- NYJ – Justin Fields 2-yard run (Nick Folk kick), 3:46. Jets 26–17. **Drive: 8 plays, 68 yards, 5:11.**

**Fourth quarter**

- PIT – Jaylen Warren 5-yard pass from Aaron Rodgers (Chris Boswell kick), 14:57. Jets 26–24. **Drive: 9 plays, 68 yards, 3:49.**
- PIT – Calvin Austin III 18-yard pass from Aaron Rodgers (Chris Boswell kick), 14:07. Steelers 31–26. **Drive: 2 plays, 22 yards, 0:43.**
- NYJ – Justin Fields 1-yard run (pass failed), 7:01. Jets 32–31. **Drive: 12 plays, 67 yards, 7:06.**
- PIT – Chris Boswell 60-yard field goal, 1:03. Steelers 34–32. **Drive: 6 plays, 39 yards, 2:10.**

**Top passers**

- PIT – Aaron Rodgers – 22/30, 244 yards, 4 TD
- NYJ – Justin Fields – 16/22, 218 yards, TD

**Top rushers**

- PIT – Jaylen Warren – 11 rushes, 37 yards
- NYJ – Breece Hall – 19 rushes, 107 yards

**Top receivers**

- PIT – DK Metcalf – 4 receptions, 83 yards
- NYJ – Garrett Wilson – 7 receptions, 95 yards, TD

Despite a competitive effort by the Jets, it wasn't enough to avoid their second consecutive 0–1 start and loss to Pittsburgh.

==== Week 2: vs. Buffalo Bills ====
Week 2: Buffalo Bills at New York Jets – Game summary

Quarter	1	2	3	4	Total
**Bills**	10	10	3	7	**30**
Jets	0	3	0	7	**10**

at MetLife Stadium, East Rutherford, New Jersey

- Date: September 14
- Game time: 1:00 p.m. EDT
- Game weather: Sunny, 80 °F (27 °C)
- Game attendance: 80,875
- Referee: Clete Blakeman
- TV announcers (CBS): Jim Nantz, Tony Romo and Tracy Wolfson
- Recap, Game Book

Game information

**First quarter**

- BUF – James Cook 1-yard run (Matt Prater kick), 7:29. Bills 7–0. **Drive: 12 plays, 81 yards, 5:58.**
- BUF – Matt Prater 28-yard field goal, 5:01. Bills 10–0. **Drive: 6 plays, 14 yards, 2:13.**

**Second quarter**

- BUF – Matt Prater 52-yard field goal, 14:02. Bills 13–0. **Drive: 9 plays, 46 yards, 3:31.**
- BUF – James Cook 44-yard run (Matt Prater kick), 8:50. Bills 20–0. **Drive: 5 plays, 73 yards, 2:55.**
- NYJ – Nick Folk 51-yard field goal, 4:21. Bills 20–3. **Drive: 7 plays, 31 yards, 4:29.**

**Third quarter**

- BUF – Matt Prater 33-yard field goal, 9:01. Bills 23–3. **Drive: 11 plays, 64 yards, 5:59.**

**Fourth quarter**

- BUF – Elijah Moore 4-yard run (Matt Prater kick), 14:57. Bills 30–3. **Drive: 12 plays, 79 yards, 6:59.**
- NYJ – Jeremy Ruckert 5-yard pass from Tyrod Taylor (Nick Folk kick), 3:28. Bills 30–10. **Drive: 10 plays, 54 yards, 3:07.**

**Top passers**

- BUF – Josh Allen – 14/25, 148 yards
- NYJ – Tyrod Taylor – 7/11, 56 yards, TD

**Top rushers**

- BUF – James Cook – 21 rushes, 132 yards, 2 TD
- NYJ – Justin Fields – 5 rushes, 49 yards

**Top receivers**

- BUF – Josh Palmer – 2 receptions, 47 yards
- NYJ – Garrett Wilson – 4 receptions, 50 yards

With the loss, the Jets started 0–2 for the first time since 2021.

==== Week 3: at Tampa Bay Buccaneers ====
Week 3: New York Jets at Tampa Bay Buccaneers – Game summary

Quarter	1	2	3	4	Total
Jets	3	3	0	21	**27**
**Buccaneers**	3	17	3	6	**29**

at Raymond James Stadium, Tampa, Florida

- Date: September 21
- Game time: 1:00 p.m. EDT
- Game weather: Cloudy, 88 °F (31 °C)
- Game attendance: 62,872
- Referee: Adrian Hill
- TV announcers (Fox): Kenny Albert, Jonathan Vilma and Megan Olivi
- Recap, Game Book

Game information

**First quarter**

- NYJ – Nick Folk 38-yard field goal, 8:51. Jets 3–0. **Drive: 11 plays, 51 yards, 6:09.**
- TB – Chase McLaughlin 54-yard field goal, 2:20. Tied 3–3. **Drive: 9 plays, 33 yards, 6:31.**

**Second quarter**

- NYJ – Nick Folk 42-yard field goal, 14:01. Jets 6–3. **Drive: 6 plays, 39 yards, 3:19.**
- TB – Mike Evans 5-yard pass from Baker Mayfield (Chase McLaughlin kick), 11:15. Buccaneers 10–6. **Drive: 7 plays, 77 yards, 2:46.**
- TB – Chase McLaughlin 33-yard field goal, 1:43. Buccaneers 13–6. **Drive: 5 plays, 18 yards, 1:09.**
- TB – Jamel Dean 55-yard interception return (Chase McLaughlin kick), 0:17. Buccaneers 20–6.

**Third quarter**

- TB – Chase McLaughlin 28-yard field goal, 5:51. Buccaneers 23–6. **Drive: 16 plays, 67 yards, 9:09.**

**Fourth quarter**

- NYJ – Garrett Wilson 11-yard pass from Tyrod Taylor (Nick Folk kick), 10:12. Buccaneers 23–13. **Drive: 10 plays, 80 yards, 3:54.**
- TB – Chase McLaughlin 55-yard field goal, 6:13. Buccaneers 26–13. **Drive: 8 plays, 36 yards, 3:59.**
- NYJ – Allen Lazard 4-yard pass from Tyrod Taylor (Nick Folk kick), 3:40. Buccaneers 26–20. **Drive: 11 plays, 73 yards, 2:33.**
- NYJ – Will McDonald IV 50-yard blocked kick return (Nick Folk kick), 1:49. Jets 27–26. **Drive: 6 plays, 40 yards, 1:51.**
- TB – Chase McLaughlin 36-yard field goal, 0:00. Buccaneers 29–27. **Drive: 7 plays, 48 yards, 1:49.**

**Top passers**

- NYJ – Tyrod Taylor – 26/36, 197 yards, 2 TD, INT
- TB – Baker Mayfield – 19/29, 233 yards, TD

**Top rushers**

- NYJ – Tyrod Taylor – 8 rushes, 48 yards
- TB – Bucky Irving – 25 rushes, 66 yards

**Top receivers**

- NYJ – Garrett Wilson – 10 receptions, 84 yards, TD
- TB – Emeka Egbuka – 6 receptions, 85 yards

Despite a comeback attempt in the fourth quarter, the Buccaneers scored a last second field goal to drop the Jets to 0–3. This marked their third loss to Tampa Bay since 2017.

==== Week 4: at Miami Dolphins ====
Week 4: New York Jets at Miami Dolphins – Game summary

Quarter	1	2	3	4	Total
Jets	0	3	7	11	**21**
**Dolphins**	3	7	14	3	**27**

at Hard Rock Stadium, Miami Gardens, Florida

- Date: September 29
- Game time: 7:15 p.m. EDT
- Game weather: Partly cloudy, 86 °F (30 °C)
- Game attendance: 65,848
- Referee: Craig Wrolstad
- TV announcers (ESPN): Chris Fowler, Louis Riddick, Dan Orlovsky, Peter Schrager and Katie George
- Recap, Game Book

Game information

**First quarter**

- MIA – Riley Patterson 47-yard field goal, 10:51. Dolphins 3–0. **Drive: 10 plays, 37 yards, 4:09.**

**Second quarter**

- MIA – Darren Waller 4-yard pass from Tua Tagovailoa (Riley Patterson kick), 9:20. Dolphins 10–0. **Drive: 15 plays, 96 yards, 8:40.**
- NYJ – Nick Folk 58-yard field goal, 0:00. Dolphins 10–3. **Drive: 10 plays, 44 yards, 1:52.**

**Third quarter**

- MIA – Darren Waller 9-yard pass from Tua Tagovailoa (Riley Patterson kick), 11:33. Dolphins 17–3. **Drive: 6 plays, 36 yards, 3:20.**
- NYJ – Justin Fields 43-yard run (Nick Folk kick), 9:23. Dolphins 17–10. **Drive: 4 plays, 52 yards, 2:10.**
- MIA – De'Von Achane 9-yard run (Riley Patterson kick), 5:20. Dolphins 24–10. **Drive: 7 plays, 68 yards, 4:03.**

**Fourth quarter**

- NYJ – Nick Folk 50-yard field goal, 13:09. Dolphins 24–13. **Drive: 6 plays, 31 yards, 3:15.**
- MIA – Riley Patterson 36-yard field goal, 3:33. Dolphins 27–13. **Drive: 8 plays, 56 yards, 3:29.**
- NYJ – Garrett Wilson 23-yard pass from Justin Fields (Justin Fields run), 1:49. Dolphins 27–21. **Drive: 7 plays, 61 yards, 1:44.**

**Top passers**

- NYJ – Justin Fields – 19/26, 198 yards, TD
- MIA – Tua Tagovailoa – 17/25, 177 yards, 2 TD

**Top rushers**

- NYJ – Justin Fields – 7 rushes, 81 yards, TD
- MIA – De'Von Achane – 20 rushes, 99 yards, TD

**Top receivers**

- NYJ – Garrett Wilson – 6 receptions, 82 yards, TD
- MIA – Tyreek Hill – 6 receptions, 67 yards

With the loss, the Jets fell to 0–4, and suffered their tenth consecutive loss to the Dolphins in Miami.

==== Week 5: vs. Dallas Cowboys ====
Week 5: Dallas Cowboys at New York Jets – Game summary

Quarter	1	2	3	4	Total
**Cowboys**	3	20	7	7	**37**
Jets	3	0	3	16	**22**

at MetLife Stadium, East Rutherford, New Jersey

- Date: October 5
- Game time: 1:00 p.m. EDT
- Game weather: Sunny, 82 °F (28 °C)
- Game attendance: 81,738
- Referee: Alex Moore
- TV announcers (Fox): Jason Benetti, Greg Olsen and Pam Oliver
- Recap, Game Book

Game information

**First quarter**

- NYJ – Nick Folk 25-yard field goal, 7:43. Jets 3–0. **Drive: 13 plays, 66 yards, 7:17.**
- DAL – Brandon Aubrey 35-yard field goal, 4:57. Tied 3–3. **Drive: 7 plays, 49 yards, 2:46.**

**Second quarter**

- DAL – Jake Ferguson 26-yard pass from Dak Prescott (Brandon Aubrey kick), 11:40. Cowboys 10–3. **Drive: 13 plays, 90 yards, 6:10.**
- DAL – Javonte Williams 5-yard run (Brandon Aubrey kick), 0:57. Cowboys 17–3. **Drive: 7 plays, 91 yards, 1:21.**
- DAL – Jake Ferguson 1-yard pass from Dak Prescott (kick failed), 0:15. Cowboys 23–3. **Drive: 2 plays, 67 yards, 0:14.**

**Third quarter**

- DAL – George Pickens 43-yard pass from Dak Prescott (Brandon Aubrey kick), 4:33. Cowboys 30–3. **Drive: 2 plays, 53 yards, 0:43.**
- NYJ – Nick Folk 48-yard field goal, 0:57. Cowboys 30–6. **Drive: 6 plays, 44 yards, 3:36.**

**Fourth quarter**

- NYJ – Andrew Beck 1-yard pass from Justin Fields (Justin Fields–Mason Taylor pass), 7:56. Cowboys 30–14. **Drive: 10 plays, 78 yards, 4:13.**
- DAL – Javonte Williams 4-yard pass from Dak Prescott (Brandon Aubrey kick), 4:31. Cowboys 37–14. **Drive: 8 plays, 46 yards, 3:25.**
- NYJ – Garrett Wilson 9-yard pass from Justin Fields (Justin Fields–Josh Reynolds pass), 1:42. Cowboys 37–22. **Drive: 11 plays, 70 yards, 2:49.**

**Top passers**

- DAL – Dak Prescott – 18/29, 237 yards, 4 TD
- NYJ – Justin Fields – 32/46, 283 yards, 2 TD

**Top rushers**

- DAL – Javonte Williams – 16 rushes, 135 yards, TD
- NYJ – Breece Hall – 14 rushes, 113 yards

**Top receivers**

- DAL – Ryan Flournoy – 6 receptions, 114 yards
- NYJ – Garrett Wilson – 6 receptions, 71 yards, TD

With the loss, the Jets fell to 0–5 for the first time since 2020, and became the first team in NFL history to reach that milestone without any takeaways. Head coach Aaron Glenn became the first coach in franchise history to begin his tenure with five losses. Additionally, they became the league’s lone winless team by the end of the week, with the Saints defeating the Giants and the Titans defeating the Cardinals. The Jets also fell to the Cowboys at home for the first time since 2003.

==== Week 6: vs. Denver Broncos ====
NFL London games

Week 6: Denver Broncos at New York Jets – Game summary

Quarter	1	2	3	4	Total
**Broncos**	10	0	0	3	**13**
Jets	6	0	5	0	**11**

at Tottenham Hotspur Stadium, London, England

- Date: October 12
- Game time: 2:30 p.m. BST/9:30 a.m. EDT
- Game weather: Mostly sunny, 59 °F (15 °C)
- Game attendance: 61,155
- Referee: Land Clark
- TV announcers (NFLN): Rich Eisen, Kurt Warner and Sara Walsh
- Recap, Game Book

Game information

**First quarter**

- NYJ – Nick Folk 52-yard field goal, 11:00. Jets 3–0. **Drive: 4 plays, 3 yards, 2:22.**
- DEN – Wil Lutz 57-yard field goal, 7:03. Tied 3–3. **Drive: 7 plays, 23 yards, 3:57.**
- NYJ – Nick Folk 41-yard field goal, 4:55. Jets 6–3. **Drive: 4 plays, 1 yard, 2:08.**
- DEN – Nate Adkins 16-yard pass from Bo Nix (Wil Lutz kick), 0:00. Broncos 10–6. **Drive: 9 plays, 69 yards, 4:55.**

**Second quarter**

- No scoring plays

**Third quarter**

- NYJ – Nick Folk 38-yard field goal, 10:25. Broncos 10–9. **Drive: 10 plays, 37 yards, 4:35.**
- NYJ – Offensive holding penalty enforced in the end zone, 4:56. Jets 11–10.

**Fourth quarter**

- DEN – Wil Lutz 27-yard field goal, 5:06. Broncos 13–11. **Drive: 12 plays, 65 yards, 5:10.**

**Top passers**

- DEN – Bo Nix – 19/30, 174 yards, TD
- NYJ – Justin Fields – 9/17, 45 yards

**Top rushers**

- DEN – J. K. Dobbins – 14 rushes, 40 yards
- NYJ – Breece Hall – 22 rushes, 59 yards

**Top receivers**

- DEN – Evan Engram – 5 receptions, 42 yards
- NYJ – Josh Reynolds – 3 receptions, 25 yards

The Jets' offense struggled significantly against the Broncos' defense. Denver recorded nine sacks on quarterback Justin Fields, including a game-winning sack on fourth down. The Broncos held the Jets to just 82 total net yards of offense and limited Fields to 9-of-17 passing for 45 yards. The Jets finished with −10 net passing yards, setting a franchise record for the fewest in a single game. It was also the lowest total by any NFL team since the San Diego Chargers recorded −19 passing yards against the Kansas City Chiefs in 1998.

==== Week 7: vs. Carolina Panthers ====
Week 7: Carolina Panthers at New York Jets – Game summary

Quarter	1	2	3	4	Total
**Panthers**	3	7	3	0	**13**
Jets	0	3	0	3	**6**

at MetLife Stadium, East Rutherford, New Jersey

- Date: October 19
- Game time: 1:00 p.m. EDT
- Game weather: Mostly Sunny, 71 °F (22 °C)
- Game attendance: 71,047
- Referee: Brad Rogers
- TV announcers (Fox): Chris Myers, Mark Schlereth and Sarah Kustok
- Recap, Game Book

Game information

**First quarter**

- CAR – Ryan Fitzgerald 30-yard field goal, 5:42. Panthers 3–0. **Drive: 13 plays, 54 yards, 6:34.**

**Second quarter**

- NYJ – Nick Folk 34-yard field goal, 11:02. Tied 3–3. **Drive: 7 plays, 33 yards, 3:48.**
- CAR – Xavier Legette 3-yard pass from Bryce Young (Ryan Fitzgerald kick), 1:11. Panthers 10–3. **Drive: 7 plays, 52 yards, 2:30.**

**Third quarter**

- CAR – Ryan Fitzgerald 29-yard field goal, 10:40. Panthers 13–3. **Drive: 10 plays, 38 yards, 4:20.**

**Fourth quarter**

- NYJ – Nick Folk 47-yard field goal, 6:46. Panthers 13–6. **Drive: 9 plays, 56 yards, 2:27.**

**Top passers**

- CAR – Bryce Young – 15/25, 138 yards, TD
- NYJ – Tyrod Taylor – 10/22, 126 yards, 2 INT

**Top rushers**

- CAR – Rico Dowdle – 17 rushes, 79 yards
- NYJ – Breece Hall – 11 rushes, 38 yards

**Top receivers**

- CAR – Xavier Legette – 9 receptions, 92 yards, TD
- NYJ – Tyler Johnson – 3 receptions, 60 yards

Fields struggled once again, completing 6-of-12 passes for 46 yards in the first half. At the start of the third quarter, he was benched in favor of Tyrod Taylor, but the change wasn’t enough, as the Jets lost their seventh straight game to fall to 0–7. They joined the 2020 Jets and the 1996 Jets as the only teams in franchise history to start a season 0–7. The game also marked the end of Sauce Gardner's tenure as a Jet.

==== Week 8: at Cincinnati Bengals ====
Week 8: New York Jets at Cincinnati Bengals – Game summary

Quarter	1	2	3	4	Total
**Jets**	0	13	3	23	**39**
Bengals	10	14	7	7	**38**

at Paycor Stadium, Cincinnati, Ohio

- Date: October 26
- Game time: 1:00 p.m. EDT
- Game weather: Cloudy, 57 °F (14 °C)
- Game attendance: 65,526
- Referee: Scott Novak
- TV announcers (CBS): Spero Dedes, Adam Archuleta and Aditi Kinkhabwala
- Recap, Game Book

Game information

**First quarter**

- CIN – Evan McPherson 26-yard field goal, 10:14. Bengals 3–0. **Drive: 11 plays, 67 yards, 4:46.**
- CIN – Joe Flacco 1-yard run (Evan McPherson kick), 5:35. Bengals 10–0. **Drive: 5 plays, 35 yards, 2:41.**

**Second quarter**

- NYJ – Nick Folk 46-yard field goal, 12:12. Bengals 10–3. **Drive: 7 plays, 46 yards, 4:04.**
- CIN – Tee Higgins 44-yard pass from Joe Flacco (Evan McPherson kick), 10:45. Bengals 17–3. **Drive: 3 plays, 69 yards, 1:27.**
- NYJ – Tyler Johnson 15-yard pass from Justin Fields (Nick Folk kick), 5:18. Bengals 17–10. **Drive: 9 plays, 78 yards, 5:27.**
- CIN – Chase Brown 19-yard pass from Joe Flacco (Evan McPherson kick), 1:15. Bengals 24–10. **Drive: 10 plays, 65 yards, 4:03.**
- NYJ – Nick Folk 25-yard field goal, 0:00. Bengals 24–13. **Drive: 12 plays, 58 yards, 1:15.**

**Third quarter**

- NYJ – Nick Folk 24-yard field goal, 6:12. Bengals 24–16. **Drive: 10 plays, 80 yards, 4:31.**
- CIN – Samaje Perine 32-yard run (Evan McPherson kick), 2:34. Bengals 31–16. **Drive: 8 plays, 65 yards, 3:38.**

**Fourth quarter**

- NYJ – Breece Hall 5-yard run (Justin Fields run), 14:17. Bengals 31–24. **Drive: 6 plays, 66 yards, 3:17.**
- CIN – Chase Brown 1-yard run (Evan McPherson kick), 10:21. Bengals 38–24. **Drive: 7 plays, 73 yards, 3:56.**
- NYJ – Breece Hall 27-yard run (Justin Fields–Isaiah Davis pass), 7:52. Bengals 38–32. **Drive: 5 plays, 60 yards, 2:29.**
- NYJ – Mason Taylor 4-yard pass from Breece Hall (Nick Folk kick), 1:54. Jets 39–38. **Drive: 9 plays, 58 yards, 4:56.**

**Top passers**

- NYJ – Justin Fields – 21/32, 244 yards, TD
- CIN – Joe Flacco – 21/34, 223 yards, 2 TD

**Top rushers**

- NYJ – Breece Hall – 18 rushes, 133 yards, 2 TD
- CIN – Samaje Perine – 9 rushes, 94 yards, TD

**Top receivers**

- NYJ – Tyler Johnson – 3 receptions, 64 yards, TD
- CIN – Ja'Marr Chase – 12 receptions, 91 yards

Before the game, it was announced that longtime Jets center Nick Mangold had died at the age of 41 from complications related to kidney disease.

The Jets stumbled out of the gate once again, falling behind the Bengals and entering the fourth quarter trailing 31–16. Both teams exchanged touchdowns, giving Cincinnati a 38–24 lead with 10:21 remaining. The Jets then mounted a comeback, scoring two unanswered touchdowns. Running back Breece Hall threw a touchdown pass to tight end Mason Taylor, giving New York a one-point lead. The Bengals attempted a late comeback but turned the ball over on downs, sealing the Jets’ first win of the season, becoming the final team in the league to record a win this season.

The Jets finished with 502 total yards of offense, including a season-high 254 rushing yards. Justin Fields bounced back from two bad performances and completed 21-of-32 passes for 244 yards and one touchdown. Hall became the fourth non-quarterback since 1950 to throw a game-winning touchdown pass in the final two minutes of the fourth quarter or overtime. He was also the first non-quarterback to record multiple rushing touchdowns and a touchdown pass in the fourth quarter of a game. Head coach Aaron Glenn recorded his first win after starting the season 0–7, setting a franchise record for the longest losing streak to begin a tenure by a new Jets head coach. With the win, the Jets improved to 1–7 and 1–1 against the AFC North.

==== Week 10: vs. Cleveland Browns ====
Week 10: Cleveland Browns at New York Jets – Game summary

Quarter	1	2	3	4	Total
Browns	7	10	0	3	**20**
**Jets**	14	3	0	10	**27**

at MetLife Stadium, East Rutherford, New Jersey

- Date: November 9
- Game time: 1:00 p.m. EST
- Game weather: Cloudy, 62 °F (17 °C)
- Game attendance: 72,623
- Referee: Shawn Smith
- TV announcers (CBS): Spero Dedes, Adam Archuleta and Aditi Kinkhabwala
- Recap, Game Book

Game information

**First quarter**

- CLE – David Njoku 9-yard pass from Dillon Gabriel (Andre Szmyt kick), 6:34. Browns 7–0. **Drive: 9 plays, 95 yards, 5:02.**
- NYJ – Kene Nwangwu 99-yard kickoff return (Nick Folk kick), 6:21. Tied 7–7.
- NYJ – Isaiah Williams 74-yard punt return (Nick Folk kick), 5:45. Jets 14–7.

**Second quarter**

- CLE – Jerry Jeudy 22-yard pass from Dillon Gabriel (Andre Szmyt kick), 10:34. Tied 14–14. **Drive: 1 play, 22 yards, 0:07.**
- NYJ – Nick Folk 26-yard field goal, 3:51. Jets 17–14. **Drive: 11 plays, 64 yards, 6:43.**
- CLE – Andre Szmyt 45-yard field goal, 0:00. Tied 17–17. **Drive: 7 plays, 34 yards, 0:45.**

**Third quarter**

- No scoring plays

**Fourth quarter**

- NYJ – Breece Hall 42-yard pass from Justin Fields (Nick Folk kick), 14:12. Jets 24–17. **Drive: 8 plays, 58 yards, 4:23.**
- NYJ – Nick Folk 37-yard field goal, 6:13. Jets 27–17. **Drive: 6 plays, 41 yards, 4:02.**
- CLE – Andre Szmyt 29-yard field goal, 2:57. Jets 27–20. **Drive: 10 plays, 58 yards, 3:16.**

**Top passers**

- CLE – Dillon Gabriel – 17/32, 167 yards, 2 TD
- NYJ – Justin Fields – 6/11, 54 yards, TD, INT

**Top rushers**

- CLE – Quinshon Judkins – 22 rushes, 75 yards
- NYJ – Breece Hall – 21 rushes, 83 yards

**Top receivers**

- CLE – Jerry Jeudy – 6 receptions, 78 yards, TD
- NYJ – Breece Hall – 1 reception, 42 yards, TD

After the Browns scored a touchdown, Kene Nwangwu returned a kickoff 99 yards for a score. On the very next drive following a Browns punt, Isaiah Williams returned a punt 74 yards for a touchdown. This marked the first time in franchise history that the Jets had both a kickoff return and a punt return for a touchdown in the same game. The Jets managed to hold off the Browns for their second win of the season

Will McDonald IV tied a Jets franchise record when he finished with four sacks.

With the win, the Jets improved to 2–7 and 2–1 against the AFC North.

==== Week 11: at New England Patriots ====
Week 11: New York Jets at New England Patriots – Game summary

Quarter	1	2	3	4	Total
Jets	7	0	7	0	**14**
**Patriots**	0	14	7	6	**27**

at Gillette Stadium, Foxborough, Massachusetts

- Date: November 13
- Game time: 8:15 p.m. EST
- Game weather: Clear, 39 °F (4 °C)
- Game attendance: 64,628
- Referee: Alan Eck
- TV announcers (Prime Video): Al Michaels, Kirk Herbstreit and Kaylee Hartung
- Recap, Game Book

Game information

**First quarter**

- NYJ – Justin Fields 5-yard run (Nick Folk kick), 6:56. Jets 7–0. **Drive: 14 plays, 72 yards, 8:04.**

**Second quarter**

- NE – TreVeyon Henderson 7-yard run (Andres Borregales kick), 14:17. Tied 7–7. **Drive: 13 plays, 69 yards, 7:40.**
- NE – TreVeyon Henderson 7-yard run (Andres Borregales kick), 7:54. Patriots 14–7. **Drive: 8 plays, 83 yards, 4:49.**

**Third quarter**

- NE – TreVeyon Henderson 6-yard pass from Drake Maye (Andres Borregales kick), 7:46. Patriots 21–7. **Drive: 6 plays, 69 yards, 3:30.**
- NYJ – John Metchie III 22-yard pass from Justin Fields (Nick Folk kick), 3:10. Patriots 21–14. **Drive: 9 plays, 65 yards, 4:36.**

**Fourth quarter**

- NE – Andres Borregales 44-yard field goal, 12:06. Patriots 24–14. **Drive: 10 plays, 46 yards, 6:04.**
- NE – Andres Borregales 26-yard field goal, 6:36. Patriots 27–14. **Drive: 4 plays, 3 yards, 0:53.**

**Top passers**

- NYJ – Justin Fields – 15/26, 116 yards, TD
- NE – Drake Maye – 25/34, 281 yards, TD

**Top rushers**

- NYJ – Justin Fields – 11 rushes, 67 yards, TD
- NE – TreVeyon Henderson – 19 rushes, 62 yards, 2 TD

**Top receivers**

- NYJ – John Metchie III – 3 receptions, 45 yards, TD
- NE – Stefon Diggs – 9 receptions, 105 yards

With their 17th loss in their last 19 against the Patriots since 2016, the Jets fell to 2–8 and 0–3 against the AFC East.

==== Week 12: at Baltimore Ravens ====
Week 12: New York Jets at Baltimore Ravens – Game summary

Quarter	1	2	3	4	Total
Jets	0	7	0	3	**10**
**Ravens**	0	3	14	6	**23**

at M&T Bank Stadium, Baltimore, Maryland

- Date: November 23
- Game time: 1:00 p.m. EST
- Game weather: Cloudy, 54 °F (12 °C)
- Game attendance: 70,029
- Referee: Clete Blakeman
- TV announcers (CBS): Andrew Catalon, Charles Davis, Jason McCourty and AJ Ross
- Recap, Game Book

Game information

**First quarter**

- No scoring plays

**Second quarter**

- NYJ – John Metchie III 13-yard pass from Tyrod Taylor (Nick Folk kick), 4:04. Jets 7–0. **Drive: 12 plays, 79 yards, 6:29.**
- BAL – Tyler Loop 31-yard field goal, 1:35. Jets 7–3. **Drive: 8 plays, 45 yards, 2:29.**

**Third quarter**

- BAL – Derrick Henry 2-yard run (Tyler Loop kick), 8:49. Ravens 10–7. **Drive: 11 plays, 74 yards, 6:11.**
- BAL – Derrick Henry 2-yard run (Tyler Loop kick), 3:33. Ravens 17–7. **Drive: 7 plays, 42 yards, 3:05.**

**Fourth quarter**

- NYJ – Nick Folk 42-yard field goal, 14:41. Ravens 17–10. **Drive: 9 plays, 36 yards, 3:52.**
- BAL – Tyler Loop 35-yard field goal, 9:35. Ravens 20–10. **Drive: 9 plays, 58 yards, 5:06.**
- BAL – Tyler Loop 27-yard field goal, 0:41. Ravens 23–10. **Drive: 4 plays, 2 yards, 1:00.**

**Top passers**

- NYJ – Tyrod Taylor – 17/28, 222 yards, TD, INT
- BAL – Lamar Jackson – 13/23, 153 yards

**Top rushers**

- NYJ – Breece Hall – 16 rushes, 44 yards
- BAL – Derrick Henry – 21 rushes, 64 yards, 2 TD

**Top receivers**

- NYJ – Breece Hall – 4 receptions, 75 yards
- BAL – Zay Flowers – 5 receptions, 58 yards

With the loss, the Jets finished 2–2 against the AFC North and secured their 10th consecutive losing season, falling to 2–9.

The Jets decided to bench Justin Fields and named Tyrod Taylor the starting quarterback.

==== Week 13: vs. Atlanta Falcons ====
Week 13: Atlanta Falcons at New York Jets – Game summary

Quarter	1	2	3	4	Total
Falcons	0	7	10	7	**24**
**Jets**	0	7	7	13	**27**

at MetLife Stadium, East Rutherford, New Jersey

- Date: November 30
- Game time: 1:00 p.m. EST
- Game weather: Cloudy, 43 °F (6 °C)
- Game attendance: 70,012
- Referee: Shawn Hochuli
- TV announcers (Fox): Kenny Albert, Jonathan Vilma and Megan Olivi
- Recap, Game Book

Game information

**First quarter**

- No scoring plays

**Second quarter**

- NYJ – Breece Hall 2-yard run (Nick Folk kick), 13:58. Jets 7–0. **Drive: 1 play, 2 yards, 0:02.**
- ATL – Tyler Allgeier 1-yard run (Zane Gonzalez kick), 0:09. Tied 7–7. **Drive: 10 plays, 62 yards, 3:01.**

**Third quarter**

- ATL – Bijan Robinson 5-yard run (Zane Gonzalez kick), 9:36. Falcons 14–7. **Drive: 8 plays, 95 yards, 4:08.**
- NYJ – AD Mitchell 52-yard pass from Tyrod Taylor (Nick Folk kick), 8:58. Tied 14–14. **Drive: 2 plays, 65 yards, 0:38.**
- ATL – Zane Gonzalez 52-yard field goal, 0:00. Falcons 17–14. **Drive: 5 plays, 21 yards, 1:44.**

**Fourth quarter**

- NYJ – Nick Folk 32-yard field goal, 13:23. Tied 17–17. **Drive: 4 plays, 1 yard, 1:37.**
- ATL – David Sills 9-yard pass from Kirk Cousins (Zane Gonzalez kick), 8:46. Falcons 24–17. **Drive: 8 plays, 74 yards, 4:37.**
- NYJ – Tyrod Taylor 10-yard run (Nick Folk kick), 1:53. Tied 24–24. **Drive: 15 plays, 65 yards, 6:53.**
- NYJ – Nick Folk 56-yard field goal, 0:00. Jets 27–24. **Drive: 7 plays, 19 yards, 0:35.**

**Top passers**

- ATL – Kirk Cousins – 21/33, 234 yards, TD
- NYJ – Tyrod Taylor – 19/33, 172 yards, TD

**Top rushers**

- ATL – Bijan Robinson – 23 rushes, 142 yards, TD
- NYJ – Breece Hall – 19 rushes, 68 yards, TD

**Top receivers**

- ATL – Kyle Pitts – 7 receptions, 82 yards
- NYJ – AD Mitchell – 8 receptions, 102 yards, TD

With their first win against Atlanta since 2013, the Jets improved to 3–9 and 1–2 against the NFC South. This ended up being the Jets' final victory of 2025.

==== Week 14: vs. Miami Dolphins ====
Week 14: Miami Dolphins at New York Jets – Game summary

Quarter	1	2	3	4	Total
**Dolphins**	21	3	0	10	**34**
Jets	7	0	0	3	**10**

at MetLife Stadium, East Rutherford, New Jersey

- Date: December 7
- Game time: 1:00 p.m. EST
- Game weather: Cloudy, 41 °F (5 °C)
- Game attendance: 68,625
- Referee: Bill Vinovich
- TV announcers (CBS): Spero Dedes, Adam Archuleta and Aditi Kinkhabwala
- Recap, Game Book

Game information

**First quarter**

- MIA – Jaylen Waddle 3-yard pass from Tua Tagovailoa (Riley Patterson kick), 12:46. Dolphins 7–0. **Drive: 4 plays, 69 yards, 2:14.**
- MIA – De'Von Achane 13-yard run (Riley Patterson kick), 8:48. Dolphins 14–0. **Drive: 5 plays, 80 yards, 2:56.**
- MIA – Jaylen Wright 2-yard run (Riley Patterson kick), 3:39. Dolphins 21–0. **Drive: 6 plays, 29 yards, 3:48.**
- NYJ – Isaiah Williams 78-yard punt return (Nick Folk kick), 0:20. Dolphins 21–7.

**Second quarter**

- MIA – Riley Patterson 43-yard field goal, 1:56. Dolphins 24–7. **Drive: 7 plays, 55 yards, 5:14.**

**Third quarter**

- No scoring plays

**Fourth quarter**

- NYJ – Nick Folk 31-yard field goal, 12:13. Dolphins 24–10. **Drive: 12 plays, 65 yards, 5:25.**
- MIA – Ollie Gordon II 7-yard run (Riley Patterson kick), 6:18. Dolphins 31–10. **Drive: 9 plays, 67 yards, 5:55.**
- MIA – Riley Patterson 53-yard field goal, 2:24. Dolphins 34–10. **Drive: 6 plays, 7 yards, 2:06.**

**Top passers**

- MIA – Tua Tagovailoa – 13/21, 127 yards, TD
- NYJ – Brady Cook – 14/30, 163 yards, 2 INT

**Top rushers**

- MIA – Jaylen Wright – 24 rushes, 107 yards, TD
- NYJ – Breece Hall – 14 rushes, 43 yards

**Top receivers**

- MIA – Jaylen Waddle – 5 receptions, 50 yards, TD
- NYJ – Mason Taylor – 5 receptions, 51 yards

With the loss, the Jets were eliminated from playoff contention for the 15th consecutive season, extending the NFL’s longest active playoff drought.

==== Week 15: at Jacksonville Jaguars ====
Week 15: New York Jets at Jacksonville Jaguars – Game summary

Quarter	1	2	3	4	Total
Jets	7	3	3	7	**20**
**Jaguars**	14	17	10	7	**48**

at EverBank Stadium, Jacksonville, Florida

- Date: December 14
- Game time: 1:00 p.m. EST
- Game weather: 70 °F (21 °C)
- Game attendance: 60,815
- Referee: Shawn Smith
- TV announcers (CBS): Tom McCarthy, Ross Tucker and Tiffany Blackmon
- Recap, Game Book

Game information

**First quarter**

- JAX – Brian Thomas Jr. 4-yard pass from Trevor Lawrence (Cam Little kick), 10:18. Jaguars 7–0. **Drive: 9 plays, 72 yards, 4:42.**
- JAX – Trevor Lawrence 15-yard run (Cam Little kick), 6:24. Jaguars 14–0. **Drive: 5 plays, 38 yards, 2:22.**
- NYJ – Adonai Mitchell 9-yard pass from Brady Cook (Nick Folk kick), 1:47. Jaguars 14–7. **Drive: 8 plays, 65 yards, 4:37.**

**Second quarter**

- JAX – Bhayshul Tuten 16-yard pass from Trevor Lawrence (Cam Little kick), 14:14. Jaguars 21–7. **Drive: 5 plays, 55 yards, 2:33.**
- NYJ – Nick Folk 41-yard field goal, 5:03. Jaguars 21–10. **Drive: 9 plays, 41 yards, 4:36.**
- JAX – Cam Little 33-yard field goal, 1:33. Jaguars 24–10. **Drive: 10 plays, 45 yards, 3:30.**
- JAX – Travis Etienne 20-yard pass from Trevor Lawrence (Cam Little kick), 0:21. Jaguars 31–10. **Drive: 5 plays, 47 yards, 0:46.**

**Third quarter**

- NYJ – Nick Folk 51-yard field goal, 10:47. Jaguars 31–13. **Drive: 9 plays, 32 yards, 4:13.**
- JAX – Travis Etienne 8-yard pass from Trevor Lawrence (Cam Little kick), 7:01. Jaguars 38–13. **Drive: 7 plays, 72 yards, 3:46.**
- JAX – Cam Little 22-yard field goal, 1:43. Jaguars 41–13. **Drive: 7 plays, 38 yards, 2:58.**

**Fourth quarter**

- NYJ – Isaiah Davis 24-yard run (Nick Folk kick), 14:08. Jaguars 41–20. **Drive: 5 plays, 65 yards, 2:35.**
- JAX – Travis Etienne 45-yard pass from Trevor Lawrence (Cam Little kick), 13:40. Jaguars 48–20. **Drive: 2 plays, 45 yards, 0:28.**

**Top passers**

- NYJ – Brady Cook – 22/33, 176 yards, TD, 3 INT
- JAX – Trevor Lawrence – 20/32, 330 yards, 5 TD

**Top rushers**

- NYJ – Isaiah Davis – 9 rushes, 58 yards, TD
- JAX – Trevor Lawrence – 5 rushes, 51 yards, TD

**Top receivers**

- NYJ – Adonai Mitchell – 6 receptions, 58 yards, TD
- JAX – Travis Etienne – 3 receptions, 73 yards, 3 TD

Following another poor defensive performance, the Jets fired defensive coordinator Steve Wilks the next day. Defensive backs/pass game coordinator Chris Harris took over as the team’s defensive play-caller.

==== Week 16: at New Orleans Saints ====
Week 16: New York Jets at New Orleans Saints – Game summary

Quarter	1	2	3	4	Total
Jets	3	3	0	0	**6**
**Saints**	3	6	7	13	**29**

at Caesars Superdome, New Orleans, Louisiana

- Date: December 21
- Game time: 1:00 p.m. EST/12:00 p.m. CST
- Game weather: None (indoor stadium)
- Game attendance: 70,043
- Referee: Clay Martin
- TV announcers (CBS): Tom McCarthy, Ross Tucker and Tiffany Blackmon
- Recap, Game Book

Game information

**First quarter**

- NYJ – Nick Folk 29-yard field goal, 10:38. Jets 3–0. **Drive: 8 plays, 26 yards, 4:01.**
- NO – Charlie Smyth 35-yard field goal, 6:31. Tied 3–3. **Drive: 12 plays, 43 yards, 4:07.**

**Second quarter**

- NO – Charlie Smyth 49-yard field goal, 14:18. Saints 6–3. **Drive: 8 plays, 35 yards, 3:59.**
- NYJ – Nick Folk 36-yard field goal, 12:38. Tied 6–6. **Drive: 6 plays, 47 yards, 1:40.**
- NO – Charlie Smyth 36-yard field goal, 1:31. Saints 9–6. **Drive: 15 plays, 73 yards, 5:46.**

**Third quarter**

- NO – Chris Olave 23-yard pass from Tyler Shough (Charlie Smyth kick), 0:41. Saints 16–6. **Drive: 12 plays, 93 yards, 5:20.**

**Fourth quarter**

- NO – Charlie Smyth 50-yard field goal, 11:09. Saints 19–6. **Drive: 5 plays, 14 yards, 1:36.**
- NO – Charlie Smyth 39-yard field goal, 5:17. Saints 22–6. **Drive: 10 plays, 23 yards, 3:51.**
- NO – Chris Olave 38-yard pass from Taysom Hill (Charlie Smyth kick), 1:54. Saints 29–6. **Drive: 3 plays, 44 yards, 0:56.**

**Top passers**

- NYJ – Brady Cook – 22/35, 188 yards, INT
- NO – Tyler Shough – 32/49, 308 yards, TD

**Top rushers**

- NYJ – Breece Hall – 16 rushes, 54 yards
- NO – Taysom Hill – 12 rushes, 42 yards

**Top receivers**

- NYJ – Isaiah Davis – 4 receptions, 52 yards
- NO – Chris Olave – 10 receptions, 148 yards, 2 TD

With the loss, the Jets fell to 3–12 and finished 1–3 against the NFC South (1–4 against the NFC). The Jets would also set an NFL record 15 consecutive games without a defensive interception.

==== Week 17: vs. New England Patriots ====
Week 17: New England Patriots at New York Jets – Game summary

Quarter	1	2	3	4	Total
**Patriots**	14	21	7	0	**42**
Jets	0	3	0	7	**10**

at MetLife Stadium, East Rutherford, New Jersey

- Date: December 28
- Game time: 1:00 p.m. EST
- Game weather: Cloudy, 29 °F (−2 °C)
- Game attendance: 70,918
- Referee: Alex Kemp
- TV announcers (Fox): Adam Amin, Drew Brees and Kristina Pink
- Recap, Game Book

Game information

**First quarter**

- NE – Austin Hooper 2-yard pass from Drake Maye (Andres Borregales kick), 10:42. Patriots 7–0. **Drive: 7 plays, 61 yards, 4:18.**
- NE – Rhamondre Stevenson 1-yard run (Andres Borregales kick), 5:06. Patriots 14–0. **Drive: 7 plays, 85 yards, 4:07.**

**Second quarter**

- NE – Rhamondre Stevenson 22-yard pass from Drake Maye (Andres Borregales kick), 14:55. Patriots 21–0. **Drive: 7 plays, 66 yards, 3:40.**
- NYJ – Nick Folk 39-yard field goal, 9:56. Patriots 21–3. **Drive: 9 plays, 49 yards, 4:59.**
- NE – Stefon Diggs 3-yard pass from Drake Maye (Andres Borregales kick), 3:01. Patriots 28–3. **Drive: 11 plays, 74 yards, 6:55.**
- NE – Hunter Henry 13-yard pass from Drake Maye (Andres Borregales kick), 0:31. Patriots 35–3. **Drive: 10 plays, 91 yards, 1:17.**

**Third quarter**

- NE – Efton Chism III 10-yard pass from Drake Maye (Andres Borregales kick), 8:16. Patriots 42–3. **Drive: 6 plays, 47 yards, 3:30.**

**Fourth quarter**

- NYJ – Breece Hall 59-yard run (Nick Folk kick), 14:51. Patriots 42–10. **Drive: 4 plays, 69 yards, 1:57.**

**Top passers**

- NE – Drake Maye – 19/21, 256 yards, 5 TD
- NYJ – Brady Cook – 19/33, 152 yards, INT

**Top rushers**

- NE – TreVeyon Henderson – 19 rushes, 82 yards
- NYJ – Breece Hall – 14 rushes, 111 yards, TD

**Top receivers**

- NE – Stefon Diggs – 6 receptions, 101 yards, TD
- NYJ – John Metchie III – 3 receptions, 41 yards

With their 18th loss in their last 20 against New England, the Jets fell to 3–13 (0–5 against the AFC East) and they finished 2–7 at home. This was their 16th straight game without a defensive pick. New York also secured a point differential of -107 in the month in December, the worst in league history. The only notable positive for the Jets was Breece Hall becoming the first Jets running back since Chris Ivory in 2015 to secure 1,000 yards on the ground.

==== Week 18: at Buffalo Bills ====
Week 18: New York Jets at Buffalo Bills – Game summary

Quarter	1	2	3	4	Total
Jets	0	0	0	8	**8**
**Bills**	7	14	8	6	**35**

at Highmark Stadium, Orchard Park, New York

- Date: January 4
- Game time: 4:25 p.m. EST
- Game weather: Cloudy, 27 °F (−3 °C)
- Game attendance: 70,944
- Referee: Alan Eck
- TV announcers (CBS): Andrew Catalon, Charles Davis, Jason McCourty and AJ Ross
- Recap, Game Book

Game information

**First quarter**

- BUF – Dawson Knox 17-yard pass from Mitch Trubisky (Matt Prater kick), 8:17. Bills 7–0. **Drive: 11 plays, 80 yards, 6:43.**

**Second quarter**

- BUF – Ty Johnson 6-yard run (Matt Prater kick), 11:43. Bills 14–0. **Drive: 13 plays, 84 yards, 6:21.**
- BUF – Ray Davis 2-yard pass from Mitch Trubisky (Matt Prater kick), 4:58. Bills 21–0. **Drive: 5 plays, 51 yards, 2:53.**

**Third quarter**

- BUF – Gabe Davis 2-yard pass from Mitch Trubisky (Mitch Trubisky–Keon Coleman pass), 7:46. Bills 29–0. **Drive: 11 plays, 54 yards, 5:03.**

**Fourth quarter**

- BUF – Ty Johnson 6-yard pass from Mitch Trubisky (pass failed), 12:05. Bills 35–0. **Drive: 5 plays, 55 yards, 2:55.**
- NYJ – Andrew Beck 2-yard pass from Brady Cook (Brady Cook–Quentin Skinner pass), 7:33. Bills 35–8. **Drive: 10 plays, 48 yards, 4:32.**

**Top passers**

- NYJ – Brady Cook – 11/22, 60 yards, TD
- BUF – Mitch Trubisky – 22/29, 259 yards, 4 TD

**Top rushers**

- NYJ – Khalil Herbert – 12 rushes, 42 yards
- BUF – Ray Davis – 21 rushes, 151 yards

**Top receivers**

- NYJ – Isaiah Williams – 5 receptions, 24 yards
- BUF – Keon Coleman – 2 receptions, 49 yards

With the loss, the Jets finished 3–14 (their worst record since 2020) and they were swept by the AFC East for the first time since 2021 while also finishing 1–7 on the road. They also became the first NFL team to not record a single interception in a full season since interceptions became a statistic in 1933. The Jets also finished with the least amount of takeaways in a season (4) since the 2018 49ers.

=== Standings ===
==== Division ====
AFC East
	W	L	T	PCT	DIV	CONF	PF	PA	STK
^{(2)} New England Patriots	14	3	0	.824	5–1	9–3	490	320	W3
^{(6)} Buffalo Bills	12	5	0	.706	4–2	9–3	481	365	W1
Miami Dolphins	7	10	0	.412	3–3	3–9	347	424	L1
New York Jets	3	14	0	.176	0–6	2–10	300	503	L5

==== Conference ====
AFC
Seed	Team	Division	W	L	T	PCT	DIV	CONF	SOS	SOV	STK
**Division leaders**
1 (Note: Denver finished ahead of New England based on common games (Denver 6–0 to New England 5–1 against: Cincinnati, Las Vegas, NY Giants, NY Jets and Tennessee).)	Denver Broncos	West	14	3	0	.824	5–1	9–3	.422	.378	W2
2	New England Patriots	East	14	3	0	.824	5–1	9–3	.391	.370	W3
3	Jacksonville Jaguars	South	13	4	0	.765	5–1	10–2	.478	.425	W8
4	Pittsburgh Steelers	North	10	7	0	.588	4–2	8–4	.503	.453	W1
**Wild cards**
5 (Note: Houston finished ahead of Buffalo based on head-to-head victory.)	Houston Texans	South	12	5	0	.706	5–1	10–2	.522	.441	W9
6	Buffalo Bills	East	12	5	0	.706	4–2	9–3	.471	.412	W1
7	Los Angeles Chargers	West	11	6	0	.647	5–1	8–4	.469	.425	L2
**Did not qualify for the postseason**
8 (Note: Indianapolis finished ahead of Baltimore based on conference record (Indianapolis 6–6 to Baltimore 5–7).)	Indianapolis Colts	South	8	9	0	.471	2–4	6–6	.540	.382	L7
9	Baltimore Ravens	North	8	9	0	.471	3–3	5–7	.507	.408	L1
10	Miami Dolphins	East	7	10	0	.412	3–3	3–9	.488	.378	L1
11 (Note: Cincinnati finished ahead of Kansas City based on conference record (Cincinnati 5–7 to Kansas City 3–9).)	Cincinnati Bengals	North	6	11	0	.353	3–3	5–7	.521	.451	L1
12	Kansas City Chiefs	West	6	11	0	.353	1–5	3–9	.514	.363	L6
13	Cleveland Browns	North	5	12	0	.294	2–4	4–8	.486	.418	W2
14 (Note: Las Vegas finished ahead of NY Jets and Tennessee based on conference record (Las Vegas 3–9 to NY Jets 2–10 and Tennessee 2–10).)	Las Vegas Raiders	West	3	14	0	.176	1–5	3–9	.538	.451	W1
15 (Note: NY Jets finished ahead of Tennessee based on strength of victory (NY Jets .373 to Tennessee .275).)	New York Jets	East	3	14	0	.176	0–6	2–10	.552	.373	L5
16	Tennessee Titans	South	3	14	0	.176	0–6	2–10	.574	.275	L2
**Tiebreakers** (Note: When breaking ties for three or more teams under the NFL's rules, they are first broken within divisions, then comparing only the highest ranked remaining team from each division.)
