= Kevin Knox =

Kevin Knox may refer to:

- Kevin Knox (American football) (born 1971), former American football wide receiver
- Kevin Knox II (born 1999), American professional basketball player, son of the football wide receiver
