= Juanyeh Thomas =

American football player (born 2000)

No. 43 – Dallas Cowboys
- Position: Safety
- Roster status: Active

Personal information
- Born: June 24, 2000 (age 26); Niceville, Florida, U.S.
- Listed height: 6 ft 3 in (1.91 m)
- Listed weight: 217 lb (98 kg)

Career information
- High school: Walton (FL); Niceville (FL)
- College: Georgia Tech (2018–2021)
- NFL draft: 2022: undrafted

Career history
- Dallas Cowboys (2022–2025); Indianapolis Colts (2026)*; Dallas Cowboys (2026–present)
- * Offseason or practice squad member only

Awards and highlights
- Freshman All-American (2018)

Career NFL statistics as of 2025
- Total tackles: 62
- Pass deflections: 5
- Forced fumbles: 1
- Stats at Pro Football Reference

Juanyeh Ajah Thomas Sr. (born June 24, 2000) is an American professional football safety for the Dallas Cowboys of the National Football League (NFL). He played college football for the Georgia Tech Yellow Jackets and was signed by the Dallas Cowboys as an undrafted free agent in 2022. He is the older brother of Azareye'h Thomas.

== Early life ==
Thomas was born on June 24, 2000. His home in Crestview, Florida, was burned down when he was four years old and his father was charged with having intentionally done it. He thus had to be raised with his four siblings by his single mother, living in various places over the coming years, including in a sedan by a rest stop. Despite his family's circumstances, Thomas was still able to play sports, taking up football at age five.

Thomas attended Walton High School. As a sophomore in 2015, he set a national high school record with interceptions returned for touchdowns in five-consecutive games and set a school record with 8 interceptions in a single-season, while receiving All-area and All-state honors. He transferred to Niceville High School after the season.

As a senior in 2017, he had one interception and returned 2 punts for touchdowns, including a school record 90-yard return. He was received All-area and All-state honors for the third straight year. He was ranked a three-star recruit and committed to play college football for the Georgia Tech Yellow Jackets.

Thomas competed in basketball and track. He was an Honor roll student.

== College career ==
As a true freshman in 2018, Thomas served as the team's kick returner and backup safety. He appeared in all 13 games and registered one interception, 3 defensive tackles, 12 special teams tackles (led the team) and 3 non-offensive touchdowns. In the sixth game against the University of Louisville, he returned an interception for a 95-yard touchdown, setting a school record for a freshman, tying the school record for the longest interception return in an ACC game and for the fourth-longest overall. In the eleventh game against the University of Virginia, he became the second freshman in school history to return a kickoff for touchdown (77-yards). In the twelfth game against the University of Georgia, he became the first player in school history to have kickoff returns for touchdowns in two consecutive games, the fourth player to score on a 100-yard kickoff return, the third player and first freshman in school history to have two kickoff returns for touchdowns in a single-season.

As a sophomore, he started 11 out of 12 games at safety, compiling 60 tackles (fourth on the team), 4 pass breakups, one interception and one forced fumble. In the eighth game against the University of Pittsburgh, he had 8 solo tackles, 2 tackles-for-loss and one interception. In the ninth game against the University of Pittsburgh, he had 9 tackles and 2 pass breakups.

As a junior in the COVID-19-shortened 2020 season, he started all 10 games at safety, registering 59 tackles (third on the team), one interception, 5 pass breakups and two forced fumbles. He had 10 tackles in the third game against the University of Syracuse. He made 7 tackles and forced one fumble in the seventh game against the University of Notre Dame.

As a senior in 2021, he started all 12 games at safety, posting 81 tackles (third on the team), 4 tackles for loss, 6 pass breakups, one interception and 2 forced fumbles. He was named honorable-mention all-conference. In the sixth game against Duke University, he had 11 tackles and one interception. In the ninth game against the University of Miami, he made 9 tackles, 1.5 tackles for loss, one sack and one forced fumble (which was returned for a touchdown). He was invited to the NFL Scouting Combine after the conclusion of his collegiate career.

== Professional career ==
Pre-draft measurables
Height	Weight	Arm length	Hand span	Wingspan	40-yard dash	10-yard split	20-yard split	20-yard shuttle	Three-cone drill	Vertical jump	Broad jump	Bench press
6 ft 0 3/4 in (1.85 m)	212 lb (96 kg)	32 3/8 in (0.82 m)	9 3/4 in (0.25 m)	6 ft 6 1/8 in (1.98 m)	4.55 s	1.54 s	2.62 s	4.18 s	7.33 s	34.0 in (0.86 m)	10 ft 2 in (3.10 m)	17 reps
All values from NFL Combine/Pro Day

=== Dallas Cowboys ===
After going unselected in the 2022 NFL draft, Thomas signed with the Dallas Cowboys as an undrafted free agent. He did not make the final roster but afterwards joined the practice squad. He signed a reserve/future contract on January 23, 2023. After impressing in the 2023 preseason, he made the Cowboys' final roster. In his NFL debut against the New York Giants in week one, Thomas blocked a field goal that resulted in the Cowboys' first touchdown in their 40–0 win.

In Week 12 of the 2024 season, Thomas returned an onside kick for his first NFL touchdown that helped the Cowboys defeat the Washington Commanders, 34–26.

Thomas began the 2025 campaign as one of Dallas' reserve safeties, recording 26 combined tackles in seven games (including three starts as the result of an injury to Malik Hooker). On November 12, 2025, the Cowboys placed Thomas on the reserve/non-football illness list due to chronic migraine attacks that began affecting his vision.

=== Indianapolis Colts ===
On March 16, 2026, Thomas signed a one-year contract with the Indianapolis Colts. He was released by the Colts as a part of final roster cuts on August 30.

=== Dallas Cowboys (second stint) ===
On September 30, 2026, Thomas was signed to the Dallas Cowboys' practice squad. He was promoted to the active roster on October 20.

== Personal life ==
Juanyeh's mother is Stephanie Thomas. He has 4 siblings, sisters Cachet and Na'Taliyeh, and brothers Azende', who also played college football, and Thomas's younger brother, Azareye'h played cornerback for the Florida State Seminoles; Azareye'h currently plays for the New York Jets. On March 24, 2024, Thomas and his girlfriend Brandi Yvonne announced the birth of their first child.
