= Khalil Jacobs =

American football player (born 2003)

No. 59 – New England Patriots
- Position: Linebacker
- Roster status: Injured reserve

Personal information
- Born: December 1, 2003 (age 22); Jackson, Mississippi, U.S.
- Listed height: 6 ft 1 in (1.85 m)
- Listed weight: 227 lb (103 kg)

Career information
- High school: Niceville (Niceville, Florida)
- College: South Alabama (2022–2023); Missouri (2024–2025)
- NFL draft: 2026: undrafted

Career history
- New England Patriots (2026–present)
- Stats at Pro Football Reference

Khalil Jacobs (born December 1, 2003) is an American professional football linebacker for the New England Patriots of the National Football League (NFL). He played college football for the South Alabama Jaguars and the Missouri Tigers.

== Early life ==
Jacobs grew up in Jackson, Mississippi and moved to Niceville, Florida during his junior year to live with his brother, who was stationed nearby, and attended Niceville High School. In his high school career, Jacob would receive 16 receptions for 277 yards and three touchdowns. He also made 90 total tackles (51 solo and 39 assisted), 22.0 tackles for loss, 10.0 sacks, an interception for 25 yards, seven pass breakups and two fumble recoveries. He was rated a three-star recruit and committed to play college football at South Alabama over offers from Gardner–Webb, Georgia Tech and UAB.

== College career ==
=== South Alabama ===
During Jacobs' true freshman season in 2022, he appeared in 11 games, mostly on special teams. He finished the season with four total tackles (two solo and two assisted) and one quarterback hurry against Nicholls.

During the 2023 season, he played in all 13 games and started three of them, finishing the season with 56 total tackles (25 solo and 31 assisted), 8.5 tackles for loss, three sacks for 14 yards, three forced fumbles, an interception for 12 yards and three quarterback hurries.

On January 18, 2024, Jacobs announced that he would enter the transfer portal, just a few days after it was announced that head coach Kane Wommack would leave the team to become the defensive coordinator for Alabama. However, five days later on January 23, it was announced that he had withdrawn from the transfer portal.

On April 26, 2024, just a few months after withdrawing from the transfer portal, he would re-enter the transfer portal.

=== Missouri ===
On May 22, 2024, Jacobs announced that he would transfer to Missouri.

== Professional career ==
Pre-draft measurables
Height	Weight	Arm length	Hand span	Wingspan	40-yard dash	10-yard split	20-yard split	20-yard shuttle	Three-cone drill	Vertical jump	Broad jump	Bench press
6 ft 1 in (1.85 m)	227 lb (103 kg)	32 1/4 in (0.82 m)	10 1/4 in (0.26 m)	6 ft 5 3/4 in (1.97 m)	4.77 s	1.65 s	2.75 s	4.54 s	7.35 s	40.0 in (1.02 m)	11 ft 1 in (3.38 m)	27 reps
All values from Pro Day

On May 1, 2026, Jacobs signed with the New England Patriots as an undrafted free agent. He was placed on injured reserve on September 1.
