= Niceville High School =

Niceville Senior High School

Location
- 800 East John Sims Parkway; Niceville, Florida; USA; 30°31′12″N 86°28′34″W

Information
- Type: Public secondary
- Motto: "As the eagle does, soar!"
- Established: 1964
- School district: Okaloosa County School District
- Principal: Amy Meyer
- Teaching staff: 85.40 (FTE)
- Grades: 9–12
- Enrollment: 1,998 (2023-2024)
- Student to teacher ratio: 23.40
- Campus: Suburban
- Colors: Maroon, gold and white
- Mascot: Eagle
- Newspaper: The Eagle Echo
- Yearbook: Aquila
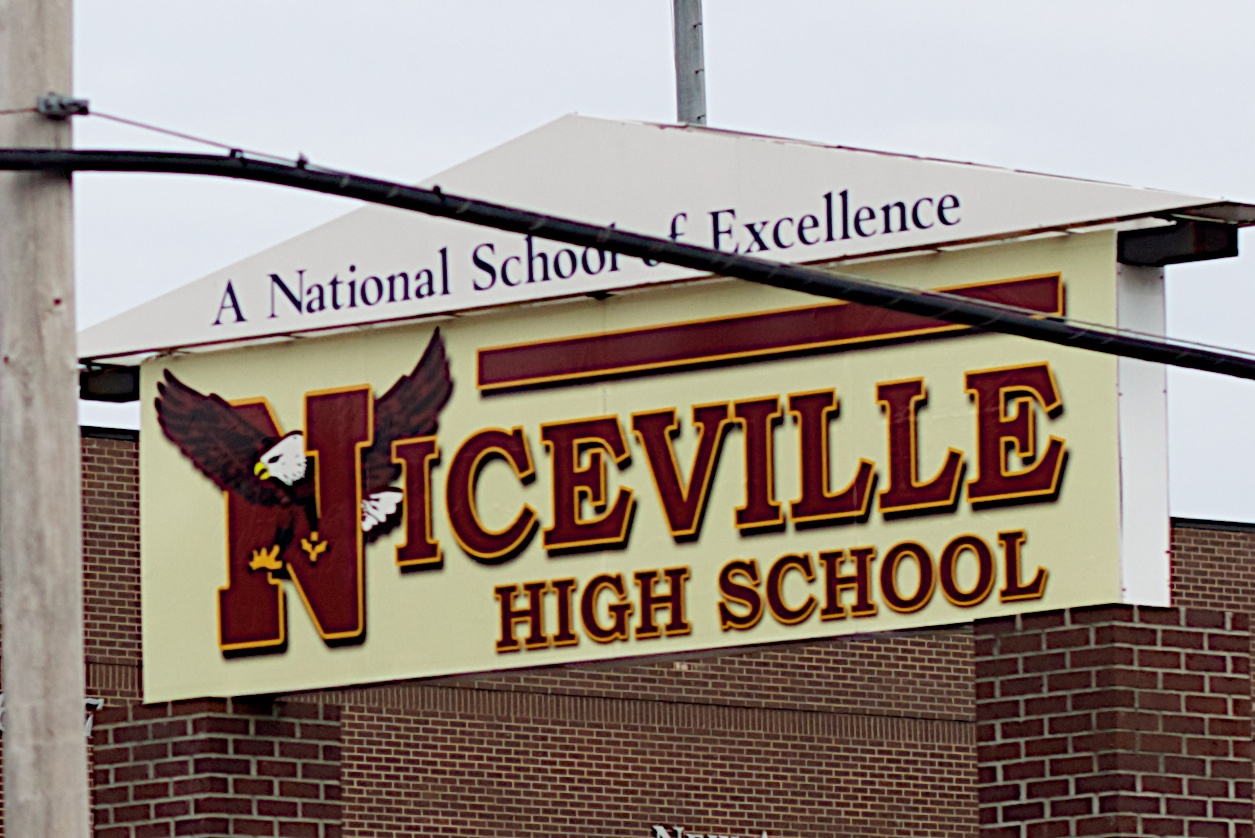

Niceville Senior High School (NHS) is a public high school in the city of Niceville, Florida. It is a part of the Okaloosa County School District.

In 1996, NHS was selected as one of 226 secondary schools (private and public) to be designated as a Blue Ribbon School of Excellence. NHS was also named a New American High School in 1999, one of only 13 in the nation to earn that honor that year. The State of Florida Department of Education rated the school an A+ in 2001, 2002, 2003, and 2005.

The current location of NHS on John Sims Parkway was not the original site of the school, opened in 1964; NHS was initially located in a dance hall on Howell Avenue and once held classes at what is now Edge Elementary.

It is the zoned high school for dependent children living on Eglin Air Force Base.

== Athletics ==
- NHS Varsity Cheerleading won the FHSAA State Championship 2020, 2021, 2022, 2023, 2024 and 2025.
- NHS Junior Varsity Cheerleading won UCA Nationals in Gameday 2022.
- NHS Varsity Cheerleading won UCA Nationals in Gameday 2021.
- NHS Junior Varsity won UCA Nationals 2021 in Gameday and Traditional Comp.
- NHS Women's Track and Field Team won the FHSAA 4A State Championship in 2022.
- NHS Men's Track and Field Team won the FHSAA 4A State Championship in 2021, 2022, 2023, 2024, 2026.
- NHS Cheerleading won Regionals 2020 2021 2022 2023 and 2024
- NHS won the state championship in football in 1988, while the 2009 and 2013 football teams placed second in the state.
- The NHS girls' cross-country team won the state championship in 1994 and were runners-up in 1995, and were crowned state champions in 2016 and runners-up in 2015.
- The 2011 softball team won the state championship in Clermont, FL, defeating Bartow High School 2–1.
- The 2011 girls' golf team won the state championship at Mission Inn Resort.
- The 2014 girls' tennis team won the state championship in Seminole, FL.
- The 2020 varsity boys' soccer team won the 6-A state championship, defeating South Broward High School 7–3.

== Student activities ==
Niceville High School's marching band is set to participate in the 135th Tournament of Roses Parade in Pasadena, California, on January 1, 2024, marking their third appearance in this prestigious event.

Students recently were sent to Plymouth, England to participate in the Natural Geography In-Shore Areas project sponsored by the University of Kyoto, Japan. Niceville High School is the only high school in the United States that is a part of the NaGISA Project.

In 2003, a team from NHS posted 43rd out of almost 200 teams in the Super Bowl of High School Calculus.

The Niceville High School forensics team has won many competitions in the South Florida region, including the University of Blue Key Tournament.

In the Xcellent 25 Writers' Poll Niceville is currently ranked seventh.

== Robotics Team ==
The school's FIRST Robotics Competition team ranked first at the regional competition in Huntsville, Alabama (the only competition in Alabama) moving on to the FIRST Championship in Houston. They have been to the world competition six times, including four times since 2013. While the team is associated with the school, they do most of their meets off campus at the Neiger Education Robotics Facility, a 6000-square-foot workshop built by mentors, alumni and students.

== FL-33RD AFJROTC ==
Niceville High School also supports an Air Force Junior Reserve Officer Training Corps program. The Corps is sponsored by the nearby the Eglin AFB's 33rd Fighter Wing. The Corps has four drill teams, Armed Regulation, Un-Armed Regulation, Armed Exhibition, and Un-Armed Exhibition, in addition to an Honor Guard, Sabre Team, and a Rocket Team that fires off rockets during the National Anthem at home football games.

== NHS Eagle Pride ==
With more than 300 members, the Niceville High School Eagle Pride is one of the largest high school bands in the region. They most recently attended the 2012 Macy's Thanksgiving Day Parade in NYC, New York, and in the same year their Wind Ensemble was one of the select few high school concert bands to perform at CBDNA in Columbus, Georgia. In 2005 the Eagle Pride marched in the Fiesta Bowl Parade and took fourth place in the national marching band contest associated with the parade. In 2008, the Niceville High School Eagle Pride participated in the Tournament of Roses Parade and Bandfest. In 2010, the Niceville Wind Ensemble performed at Carnegie Hall in New York City. They perform every year at the Southeastern States Marching Festival at Troy University in Troy, Alabama. In 2010, the Eagle Pride was chosen to march in the 2012 Macy's Thanksgiving Day Parade. In 2015, the Niceville High School Eagle Pride was selected to attend the 2017 Rose Parade for the 2nd time in school history. They were also selected to attend the Rose Parade for the 3rd time in 2024. The Niceville Wind Symphony performed in the Percy Grainger Wind Band Festival in March of 2026. They performed in the Chicago Symphony Center.

== Principals ==
- Amy Meyer (2026–Present)
- Charlie Marello (2016–2026)
- Jeff Palmer (2014–2016)
- Rodney Nobles (2012–2014)
- Marcus Chambers (2011–2012)
- Dr. Linda Smith, Ed.D. (2007–2011)
- Dr. Janie Varner, Ed.D. (2001–2007)
- Dr. David Morgan, Ed.D. (1994–2000)
- Jeanette Rhodes (1988–1994)
- Ashley Hutcheson (1971–1988)
- Colly V. Williams (1968–1971)
- Orus E. Kinney (1964–1968)

== Notable alumni ==
- Lewis Billups, former NFL player, Cincinnati Bengals
- Roy Finch, Canadian Football League player
- Matt Gaetz, former U.S. Representative for congressional district FL-1
- Khalil Jacobs, college football linebacker for the South Alabama Jaguars and the Missouri Tigers
- Cris Judd, professional dancer once married to Jennifer Lopez
- Kevin Knox, former NFL player, Arizona Cardinals, father of Kevin Knox II
- Jimmy Nelson, MLB Pitcher
- Pam Oliver, Fox Sports sideline analyst
- Craig Page, former NFL player (did not graduate from NHS)
- Julian Pittman, former NFL player, New Orleans Saints
- Conrad Ricamora, Broadway performer and television actor
- Alan Ritchson, actor, singer and songwriter, model
- Azareye'h Thomas, college football cornerback for the Florida State Seminoles
- Juanyeh Thomas, NFL safety for the Dallas Cowboys
- Ricky Thomas, former NFL player and coach
- Toby Turner, YouTube personality
- Rece Hinds, MLB Player in the Miami Marlins Organization
