= Anna Banks =

American author

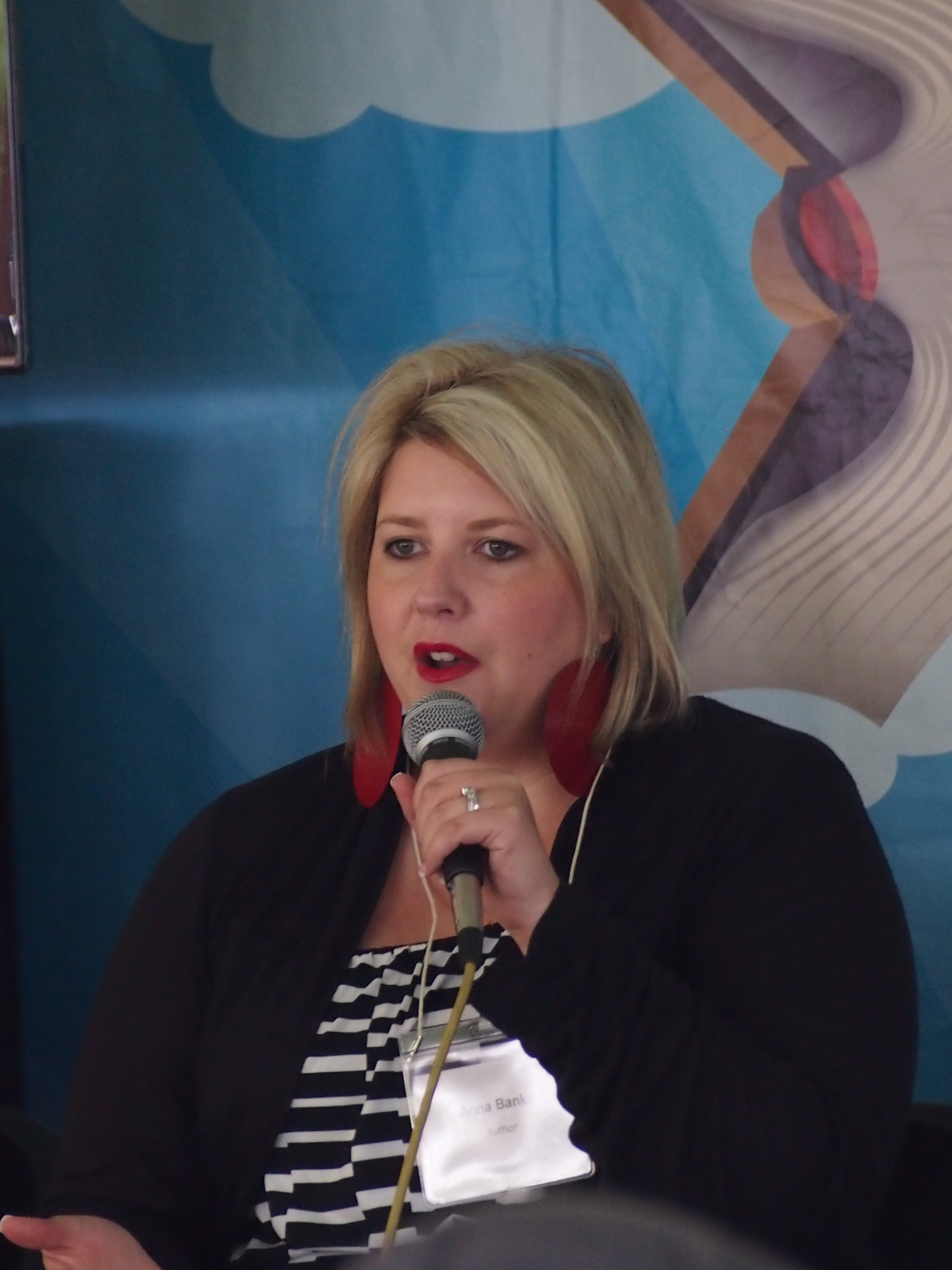
- Born: Niceville, Florida, U.S.
- Occupation: Novelist
- Writing career
- Period: 2012–present
- Genre: Young adult fantasy
- Website: byannabanks.blogspot.de

Anna Banks is an American author, best known for her New York Times best selling Syrena Legacy series. Mad Hatter Entertainment, producer on the How to Train Your Dragon franchise, has acquired movie rights to her Syrena Legacy series.

== Published works ==
=== The Syrena Legacy ===
- Of Poseidon, ISBN 9781250027368, 2012
- Of Triton, ISBN 9781250044310, 2013
- Of Neptune, ISBN 9781250039606, 2014
- Syrena Legacy Stories:
  - "Legacy Lost" (series prequel), ISBN 9781466820098, 2012
  - "The Stranger", ISBN 9781466846111, 2013
  - "Girls Day Out", ISBN 9781466866935, 2014

=== Young adult ===
- Joyride, 2016
- Nemesis, 2016
- Ally (sequel to Nemesis), 2017

=== Romance ===
- How To Lose a Bachelor, 2015
