= Breece Hall =

American football player (born 2001)

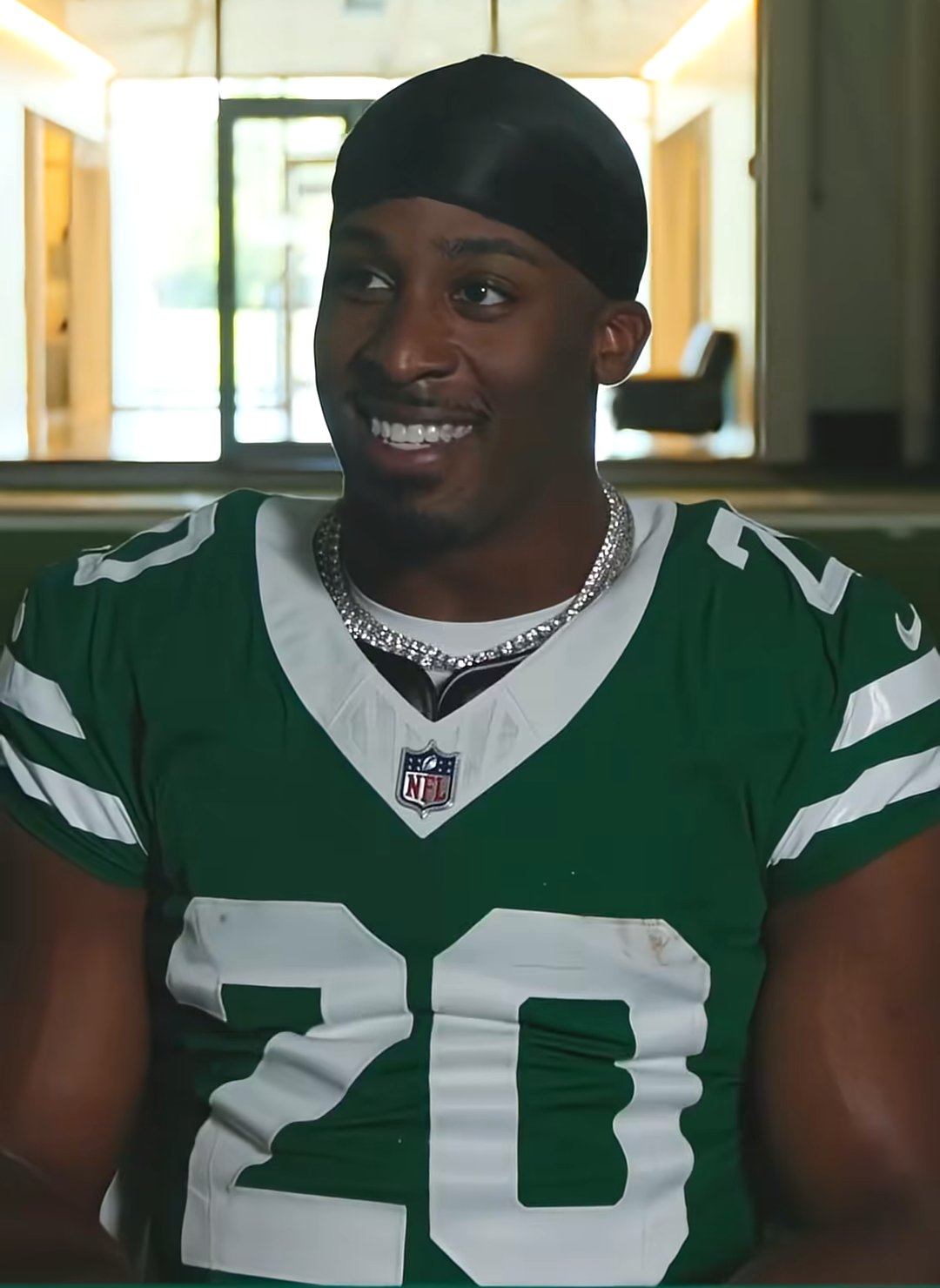
- Hall with the New York Jets in 2026

No. 20 – New York Jets
- Position: Running back
- Roster status: Active

Personal information
- Born: May 31, 2001 (age 25); Omaha, Nebraska, U.S.
- Listed height: 5 ft 11 in (1.80 m)
- Listed weight: 217 lb (98 kg)

Career information
- High school: Wichita Northwest (Wichita, Kansas)
- College: Iowa State (2019–2021)
- NFL draft: 2022: 2nd round, 36th overall pick

Career history
- New York Jets (2022–present)

Awards and highlights
- Unanimous All-American (2020); Consensus All-American (2021); NCAA rushing yards leader (2020); 2× Big 12 Offensive Player of the Year (2020, 2021); Second-team All-Big 12 (2019)

Career NFL statistics as of Week 10, 2026
- Rushing yards: 3,663
- Rushing average: 4.4
- Rushing touchdowns: 19
- Receptions: 205
- Receiving yards: 1,837
- Receiving touchdowns: 9
- Stats at Pro Football Reference

Breece Maelik Hall (born May 31, 2001) is an American professional football running back for the New York Jets of the National Football League (NFL). Hall played college football for the Iowa State Cyclones, where he was a two-time All-American and Big 12 Offensive Player of the Year. He was selected by the Jets in the second round of the 2022 NFL draft.

== Early life ==
Hall was born in Omaha, Nebraska and grew up in Wichita, Kansas, attending Wichita Northwest High School. Hall was named first-team All-Metro and first-team All-State after rushing for 2,082 yards and scoring 36 total touchdowns in his junior season. As a senior, Hall rushed for 2,127 yards and 29 touchdowns and was again named first-team All-State and the Wichita Metro Player of the Year.

== College career ==
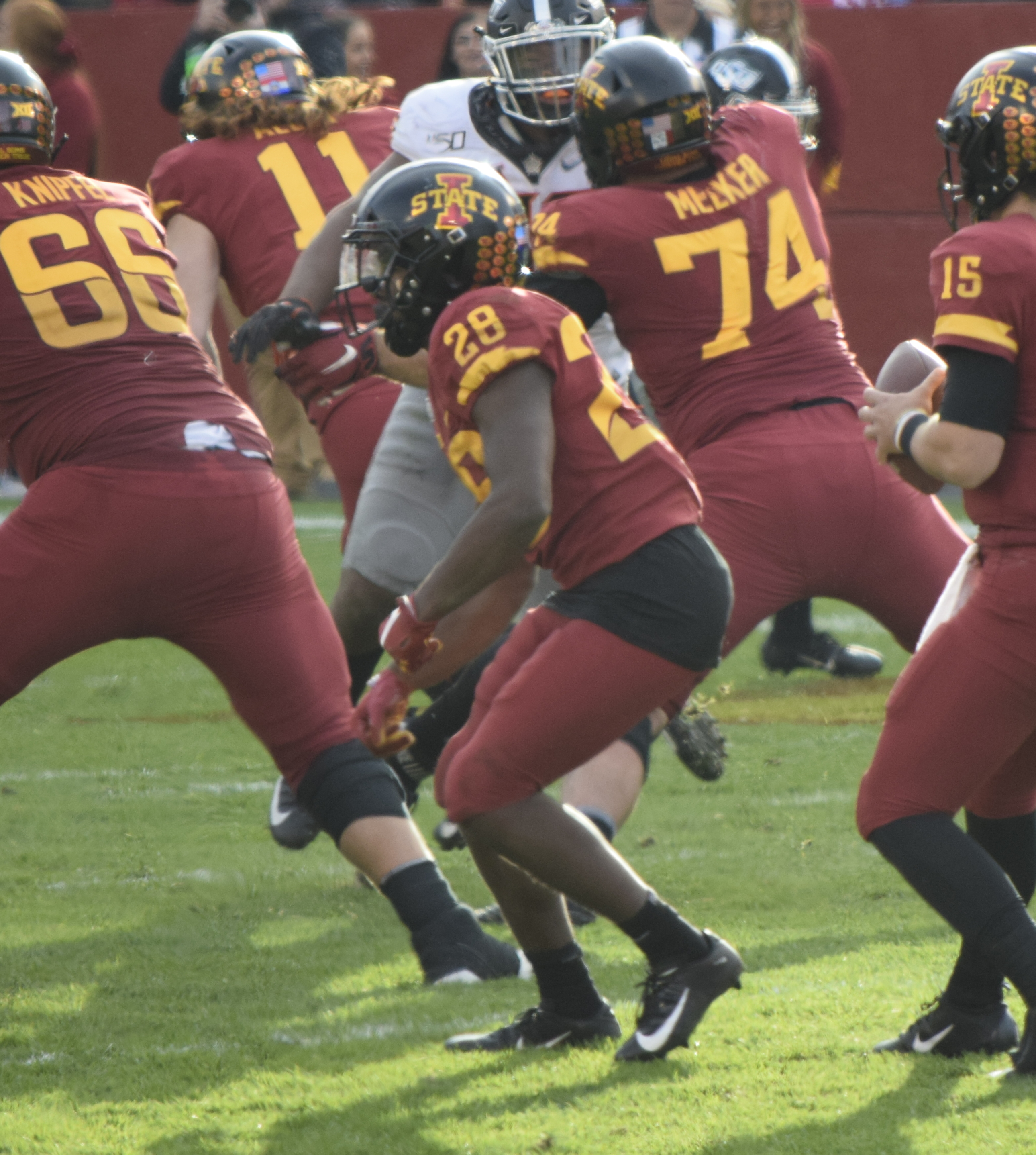
Hall (#28) with Iowa State in 2019

Following the departure of David Montgomery for the NFL, Hall became Iowa State's starting running back during his true freshman season. He was named the co-Newcomer of the Week after rushing 132 yards and three touchdowns 38–14 win over West Virginia. Hall repeated as Newcomer of the Week the following week after rushing for 183 yards and two touchdowns while also catching three passes for 73 yards. He finished the season with 897 rushing yards and nine touchdowns while also catching 23 passes for 252 yards and one touchdown and was named second-team All-Big 12.

Hall rushed for over 100 yards in eight straight games to start his sophomore season. Hall finished the season as the FBS leader in rushing yards with 1,572 on 279 carries and 21 rushing touchdowns while also catching 23 passes for 180 yards and two touchdowns. Hall was named first-team All-Big 12 and the conference Offensive Player of the Year and became the first unanimous All-American in school history.

As a junior in 2021, Hall finished with 1,472 rushing yards, 302 receiving yards, and 23 total touchdowns. Following the season, Hall announced that he would forgo his senior year and enter the 2022 NFL draft.

== Professional career ==
Pre-draft measurables
Height	Weight	Arm length	Hand span	Wingspan	40-yard dash	10-yard split	20-yard split	Vertical jump	Broad jump
5 ft 11 1/4 in (1.81 m)	217 lb (98 kg)	31 1/4 in (0.79 m)	9 3/4 in (0.25 m)	6 ft 3 7/8 in (1.93 m)	4.39 s	1.54 s	2.55 s	40.0 in (1.02 m)	10 ft 6 in (3.20 m)
All values from NFL Combine

=== 2022 ===
Hall was selected by the New York Jets in the second round with the 36th overall pick in the 2022 NFL draft, which made him the first running back selected that year.

Hall made his NFL debut in Week 1 of the 2022 season against the Baltimore Ravens. He scored his first professional touchdown on a ten-yard reception from quarterback Joe Flacco in Week 2 against the Cleveland Browns. During Week 5 against the Miami Dolphins, Hall finished with 97 rushing yards, 100 receiving yards, and a touchdown as the Jets won 40–17. For his performance on Week 6 against the Green Bay Packers, with 20 carries for 116 yards and a rushing touchdown, Hall was named FedEx Ground Player and Pepsi NFL rookie of the week.

In Week 7 against the Denver Broncos, Hall rushed for 72 yards and a touchdown, but tore his ACL and meniscus in the second quarter in the 16–9 win. He was placed on injured reserve on October 25, 2022, ending his season.

=== 2023 ===
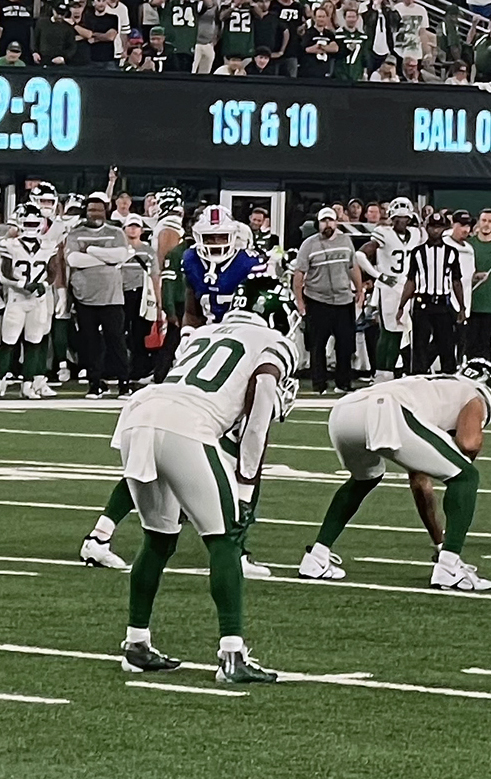
Hall in a game against the Buffalo Bills in 2023

On July 19, 2023, Hall was placed on the active/physically unable to perform list. He was activated from the active/physically unable to perform list on August 15.

During Monday Night Football against the Buffalo Bills in Week 1, Hall finished with 127 yards, including an 83-yard run as the Jets won 22–16 in overtime. During Week 5 against the Denver Broncos, Hall finished with 177 rushing yards, including a 72-yard touchdown as the Jets won 31–21. During Week 8 against the New York Giants, Hall had a 50-yard receiving touchdown, finishing with 76 receiving yards and 17 rushing yards as the Jets won 13–10 in overtime. The week after playing against the Atlanta Falcons, Hall was fined $43,709 for a hit he made on A. J. Terrell that put the latter in concussion protocol, although no penalty was called for the hit. In Week 16 against the Washington Commanders, he had 191 scrimmage yards in the 30–28 win. In Week 18 against the New England Patriots, Hall had 37 carries for 178 yards and one touchdown in the 17–3 win. In the 2023 season, Hall had 223 carries for 994 rushing yards and five rushing touchdowns to go with 76 receptions for 591 receiving yards and four receiving touchdowns.

=== 2024 ===
In Week 6 against the Buffalo Bills, Hall had 169 scrimmage yards in the 23–20 loss. The following week against the Pittsburgh Steelers, he had 141 scrimmage yards in the 37–15 loss. In the 2024 season, Hall had 209 carries for 876 rushing yards and five rushing touchdowns to go with 57 receptions for 483 receiving yards and three receiving touchdowns.

=== 2025 ===
In Week 8 against the Cincinnati Bengals, Hall threw a four-yard touchdown pass to Mason Taylor; the score proved to be the difference in the 39–38 victory, earning the Jets their first win of the season. Hall had 18 carries for 133 yards and two touchdowns to go with the passing touchdown. In the 2025 season, Hall had 243 carries for 1,065 yards and four touchdowns to go with 36 receptions for 350 yards and one touchdown. He had four games on the season going over 100 rushing yards.

=== 2026 ===
On March 3, 2026, the Jets placed the non-exclusive franchise tag on Hall. On May 8, he signed a three-year, $45.75 million contract extension, making him the third-highest-paid running back in the league.

== Career statistics ==
Legend
	Led the league
**Bold**	Career high

=== NFL ===
Year	Team	Games		Rushing					Receiving					Fumbles	
Year	Team	GP	GS	Att	Yds	Y/A	Lng	TD	Rec	Yds	Y/R	Lng	TD	Fum	Lost
2022	NYJ	7	2	80	463	**5.8**	62	4	19	218	**11.5**	**79**	1	1	1
2023	NYJ	17	16	223	994	4.5	**83**	**5**	**76**	**591**	7.8	50	**4**	2	0
2024	NYJ	16	16	209	876	4.2	42	5	57	483	8.5	57	3	**6**	1
2025	NYJ	16	16	**243**	**1,065**	4.4	59	4	36	350	9.7	42	1	2	**2**
2026	NYJ	5	5	77	265	3.4	16	1	17	195	11.5	43	0	0	0
Career		61	55	832	3,663	4.4	83	19	205	1,837	9.0	79	9	11	4

=== College ===
Legend
Led the NCAA

Year	Team	GP	Rushing				Receiving			
Year	Team	GP	Att	Yds	Avg	TD	Rec	Yds	Avg	TD
2019	Iowa State	12	186	897	4.8	9	23	252	**11.0**	1
2020	Iowa State	12	**279**	**1,572**	5.6	**21**	23	180	7.8	2
2021	Iowa State	12	253	1,472	**5.8**	20	**36**	**302**	8.4	**3**
Career		36	718	3,941	5.5	50	82	734	9.0	6

== Personal life ==
Hall has multiple family ties to professional football. His father, Bernard Hall, played college football for the Oklahoma Sooners and in the Arena Football League. His step-father, Jeff Smith, played for the Chiefs and Buccaneers over a four-year NFL career. His cousin, Kenton Keith, had a brief stint in 2004 with the Jets, which would later become Hall's team, as well as a season with the Colts in 2007. He also spent six seasons in the CFL. Hall's third cousin, Hall of Fame running back and three-time Super Bowl champion Roger Craig, played for the San Francisco 49ers in the 1980s.
