= Azareye'h Thomas =

American football player (born 2004)

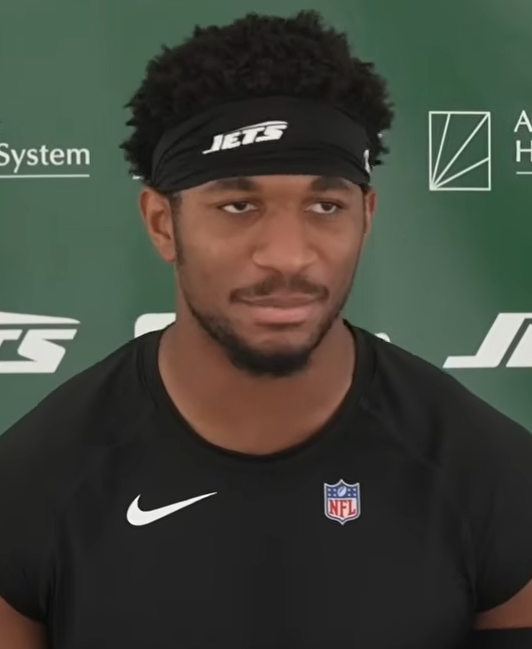
- Thomas with the New York Jets in 2025

No. 1 – New York Jets
- Position: Cornerback
- Roster status: Active

Personal information
- Born: July 6, 2004 (age 22); Okaloosa County, Florida, U.S.
- Listed height: 6 ft 1 in (1.85 m)
- Listed weight: 197 lb (89 kg)

Career information
- High school: Niceville (FL)
- College: Florida State (2022–2024)
- NFL draft: 2025: 3rd round, 73rd overall pick

Career history
- New York Jets (2025–present)

Career NFL statistics as of Week 9, 2026
- Tackles: 64
- Pass deflections: 13
- Stats at Pro Football Reference

Azareye'h Thomas (born July 6, 2004) is an American professional football cornerback for the New York Jets of the National Football League (NFL). He played college football for the Florida State Seminoles and was selected by the Jets in the third round of the 2025 NFL draft. He is the younger brother of NFL player Juanyeh Thomas.

== Early life ==
Thomas attended Niceville High School in Niceville, Florida, where he was a two-way player on the football team. He was rated as a four-star recruit, where he also held offers from schools such as Florida, Florida State, Georgia Tech, LSU, and Oklahoma. Ultimately, Thomas decided to commit to play college football for the Florida State Seminoles.

== College career ==
In week 10 of the 2022 season, Thomas recorded his first career interception in a win over Miami. He finished his freshman season with 14 tackles with two being for a loss, a pass deflection, and an interception. In 2023, Thomas played all 14 games for the Seminoles where he notched 29 tackles with four and a half being for a loss, ten pass deflections, a forced fumble, and a fumble recovery.

== Professional career ==
Pre-draft measurables
Height	Weight	Arm length	Hand span	Wingspan	40-yard dash	10-yard split	20-yard split	20-yard shuttle	Broad jump
6 ft 1 1/2 in (1.87 m)	197 lb (89 kg)	32 3/8 in (0.82 m)	10 in (0.25 m)	6 ft 6 in (1.98 m)	4.58 s	1.55 s	2.66 s	4.21 s	10 ft 2 in (3.10 m)
All values from NFL Combine/Pro Day

Thomas was selected by the New York Jets with the 73rd pick in the third round of the 2025 NFL draft. He made 12 appearances (five starts) for the Jets during his rookie campaign, recording seven pass deflections and 22 combined tackles. On December 13, Thomas was placed on season-ending injured reserve due to a shoulder injury sustained in the team's Week 14 loss to the Miami Dolphins.

== Personal life ==
Thomas is the younger brother of Dallas Cowboys safety Juanyeh Thomas.
