= Kevin Knox (American football) =

American football player (born 1971)

No. 18, 81
- Position: Wide receiver

Personal information
- Born: January 30, 1971 (age 55); Niceville, Florida, U.S.
- Listed height: 6 ft 3 in (1.91 m)
- Listed weight: 195 lb (88 kg)

Career information
- High school: Niceville
- College: Florida State
- NFL draft: 1994: 6th round, 192nd overall pick

Career history
- Buffalo Bills (1994)*; Arizona Cardinals (1994); Rhein Fire (1996); Arizona Cardinals (1996)*; Philadelphia Eagles (1997)*; Hamilton Tiger-Cats (1997); Arizona Rattlers (1998); Milwaukee Mustangs (1998); Arizona Rattlers (2000)
- * Offseason or practice squad member only

Awards and highlights
- National champion (1993)

Career AFL statistics
- Receptions: 38
- Receiving yards: 389
- Touchdowns: 9
- Stats at ArenaFan.com
- Stats at Pro Football Reference

Kevin DeVon Knox Sr. (born January 30, 1971) is an American former professional football who was a wide receiver in the National Football League (NFL), Canadian Football League (CFL), and Arena Football League (AFL). He played college football for the Florida State Seminoles, winning a national championship in 1993. Selected 192nd overall in the sixth round of the 1994 NFL draft, he played one season with the Arizona Cardinals.

Knox's son Kevin Knox II is a professional basketball player who has picked by the New York Knicks with the ninth overall pick in the 2018 NBA draft.
