= Mason Taylor =

American football player (born 2004)

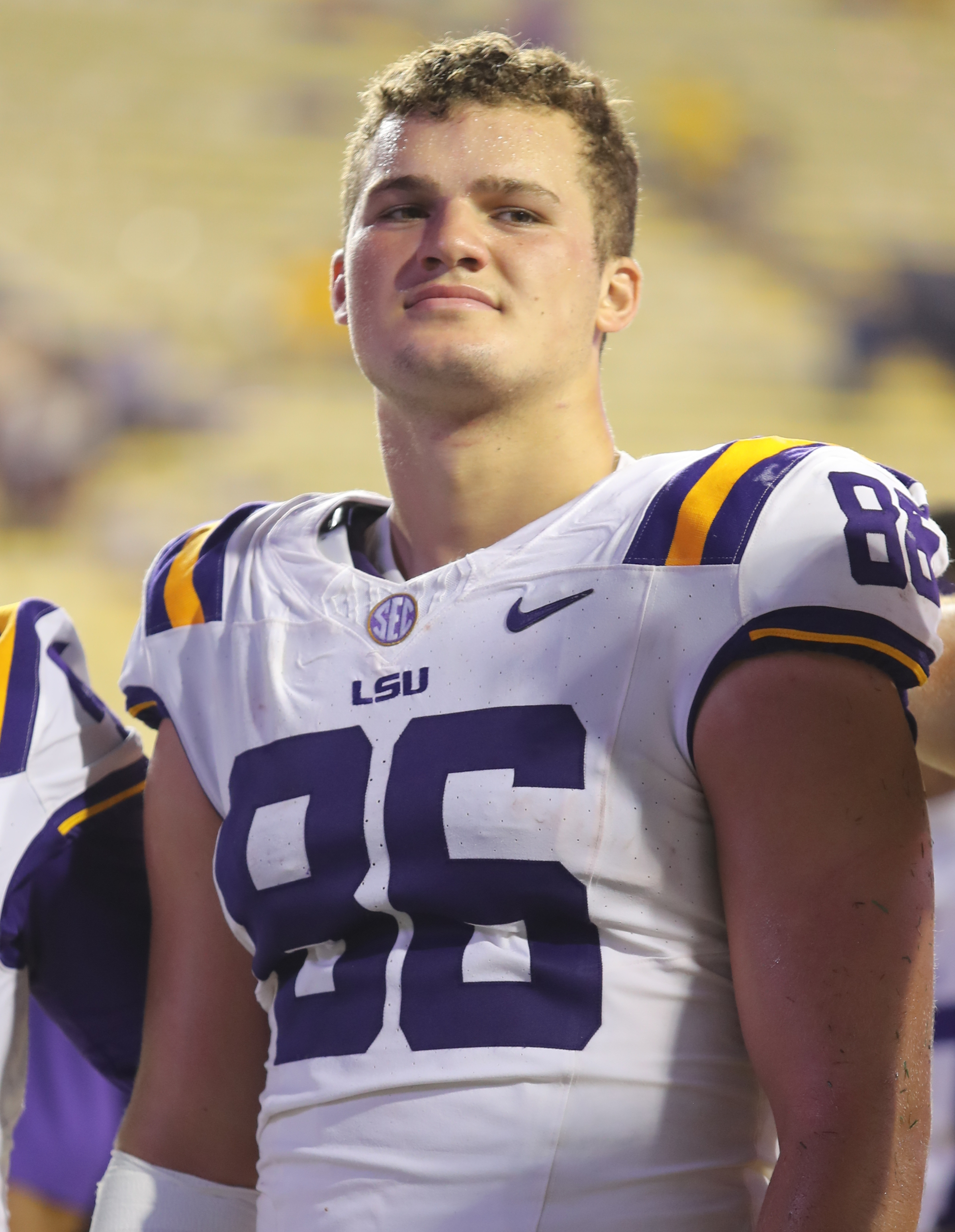
- Taylor with the LSU Tigers in 2023

No. 85 – New York Jets
- Position: Tight end
- Roster status: Active

Personal information
- Born: May 8, 2004 (age 22)
- Listed height: 6 ft 5 in (1.96 m)
- Listed weight: 251 lb (114 kg)

Career information
- High school: St. Thomas Aquinas (Fort Lauderdale, Florida)
- College: LSU (2022–2024)
- NFL draft: 2025: 2nd round, 42nd overall pick

Career history
- New York Jets (2025–present)

Career NFL statistics as of Week 5, 2026
- Receptions: 49
- Receiving yards: 391
- Receiving touchdowns: 1
- Stats at Pro Football Reference

Mason Taylor (born May 8, 2004) is an American professional football tight end for the New York Jets of the National Football League (NFL). He played college football for the LSU Tigers and was selected by the Jets in the second round of the 2025 NFL draft. Taylor is the son of Pro Football Hall of Fame defensive end Jason Taylor.

== Early life ==
Taylor attended St. Thomas Aquinas High School in Fort Lauderdale, Florida. He committed to Louisiana State University (LSU) to play college football.

== College career ==
Taylor earned playing time his true freshman year at LSU in 2022. In his first career game, he had four receptions for 34 yards. In week 10 against Alabama, he caught the game winning 2-point conversion (after a late fourth quarter touchdown) that helped LSU gain their first home win over Alabama since 2010.

== Professional career ==
Pre-draft measurables
Height	Weight	Arm length	Hand span	Wingspan	40-yard dash	10-yard split	20-yard split	20-yard shuttle	Three-cone drill	Bench press
6 ft 5 1/8 in (1.96 m)	251 lb (114 kg)	32 1/4 in (0.82 m)	10 in (0.25 m)	6 ft 6 3/4 in (2.00 m)	4.65 s	1.64 s	2.77 s	4.52 s	7.06 s	28 reps
All values from NFL Combine/Pro Day

Taylor was selected by the New York Jets in the second round, 42nd overall, of the 2025 NFL draft. Taylor recorded his first touchdown catch on a four-yard pass from running back Breece Hall in a 39–38 win against the Cincinnati Bengals. He finished his rookie season with 44 catches for 369 yards and one touchdown through 13 games (including 11 starts). On January 3, 2026, Taylor was placed on season-ending injured reserve due to a neck injury.

== NFL career statistics ==
Legend
**Bold**	Career high

Year	Team	Games		Receiving				
Year	Team	GP	GS	Rec	Yds	Avg	Lng	TD
2025	NYJ	13	11	44	369	8.4	27	1
Career		13	11	44	369	8.4	27	1

== Personal life ==
Taylor is the son of Pro Football Hall of Fame defensive end Jason Taylor and nephew of television host Joy Taylor and Pro Football Hall of Fame linebacker Zach Thomas.
