= Pam Oliver =

American sportscaster

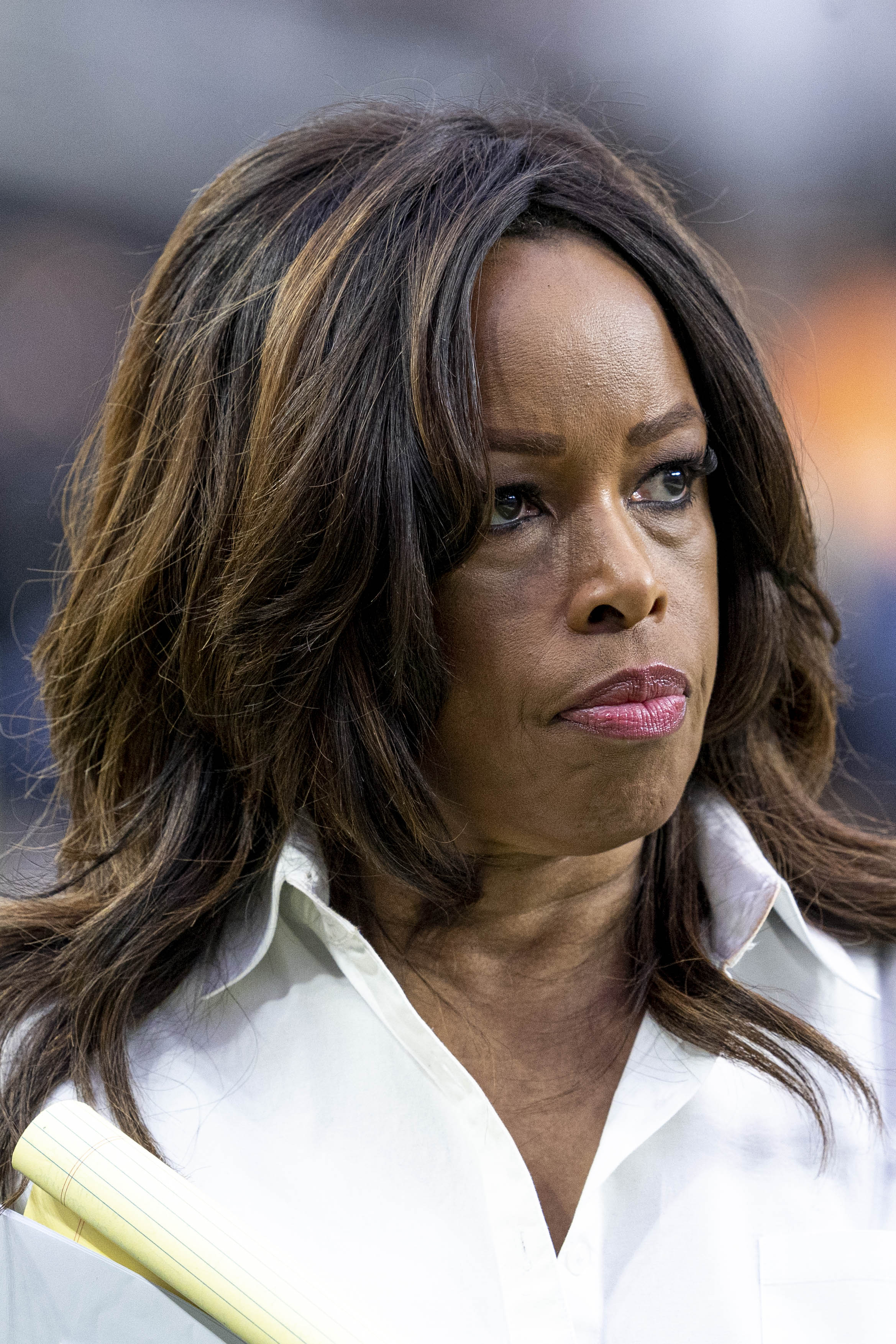
- Oliver in 2021
- Born: March 10, 1961 (age 65); Dallas, Texas, U.S.
- Education: Florida A&M University
- Years active: 1985–present

Pam Oliver (born March 10, 1961) is an American sportscaster known for her work on the sidelines for various National Basketball Association (NBA) and National Football League (NFL) games.

== Early life and education ==
Oliver was born in Dallas, Texas. She attended Niceville High School in Niceville, Florida, where she excelled in tennis, basketball, and track and field. At Florida A&M University, she was an All-American in both the 400-meter and the mile relay.

== Professional career ==
Oliver began her broadcasting career at WALB in Albany, Georgia in 1985 as a news reporter. The next year, Oliver moved to WAAY-TV in Huntsville, Alabama. After that stop, Oliver moved to WIVB-TV in Buffalo, New York in 1988. Two years later in 1990, Oliver moved to WTVT in Tampa, Florida, where she began her career as a sports anchor in 1991. Oliver moved to KHOU-TV in Houston, where she continued to be a sports anchor.

In 1993, Oliver joined ESPN. In 1995, Oliver joined Fox Sports, where she worked as a sideline reporter with the network's number-one broadcast team, Pat Summerall and John Madden. In 2005, Oliver joined TNT as a sideline reporter for their NBA Playoffs coverage and worked as a Sideline Reporter for the NBA Playoffs on TNT until 2009.

On July 14, 2014, Fox moved her to the network's #2 NFL broadcasting team, while Erin Andrews took over as sideline reporter on the #1 crew. In early 2015, Fox extended Oliver's sideline reporting job with the #2 team through the 2016 season. Oliver has continued in that role as of the 2026 season. She was the #2 team for most of the 2023 season; however, in Week 6 of the 2023 NFL, she was the #3 team for the Lions-Buccaneers game along with Adam Amin and Daryl Johnston.

On September 4, 2025, the Sports Broadcasting Hall of Fame announced Oliver's membership in its Class of 2025, noting, "She has long been recognized as one of the premier sports reporters on network television and is the longest tenured NFL sideline reporter. With widespread respect and admiration across the industry, her straightforward and candid interviewing style consistently delivers topical and substantive reports." She was inducted on December 16, 2025.
