= Dean Clark (American football) =

American football player (born 2001)

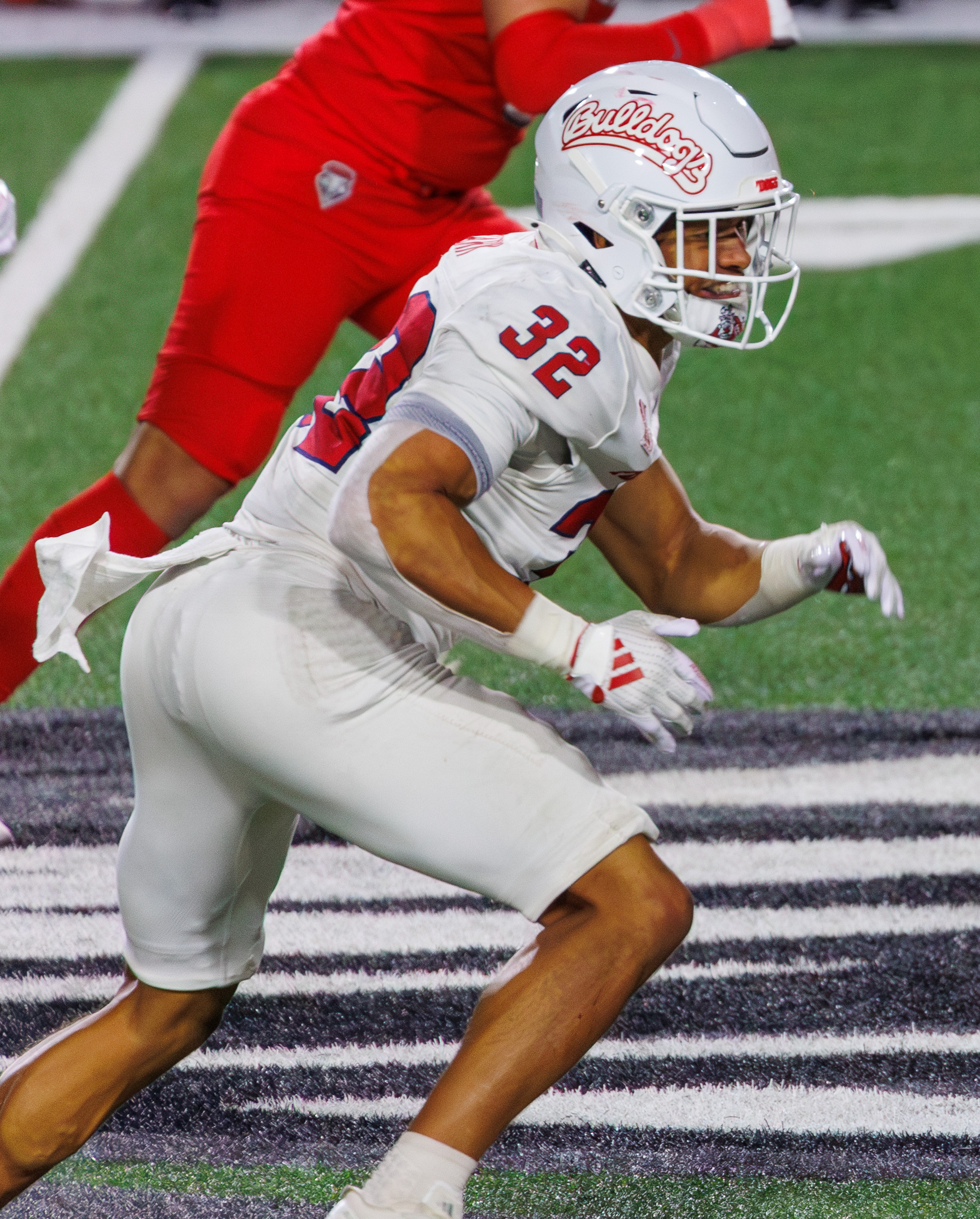
- Clark at Fresno State

Profile
- Position: Safety

Personal information
- Born: June 1, 2001 (age 25); Massillon, Ohio, U.S.
- Listed height: 6 ft 1 in (1.85 m)
- Listed weight: 206 lb (93 kg)

Career information
- High school: Massillon (Massillon, Ohio)
- College: Kent State (2019–2022); Fresno State (2023–2024)
- NFL draft: 2025: undrafted

Career history
- New York Jets (2025); Philadelphia Eagles (2026)*
- * Offseason or practice squad member only

Career NFL statistics as of 2025
- Tackles: 14
- Stats at Pro Football Reference

Dean Clark (born June 1, 2001) is an American professional football safety. He played college football for the Kent State Golden Flashes and Fresno State Bulldogs and was signed by the New York Jets as an undrafted free agent in 2025.

== Early life ==
Clark was born in Massillon, Ohio. He attended Massillon Washington High School where he played football as a safety and also competed in track and field. He became a full-time starter for Massillon as a junior and served as co-team captain as a senior. He was selected first-team All-Northeast Inland District Division II and helped Massillon reach the state title game in 2018. A three-star recruit, he committed to play college football for the Kent State Golden Flashes.

== College career ==
Clark appeared in 12 games, posting six tackles, as a true freshman for Kent State in 2019. He then recorded a team-leading 28 tackles in 2020. In 2021, he totaled 116 tackles, including 79 unassisted, and was named All-Mid-American Conference (MAC) for his performance. Clark redshirted in 2022, appearing in four games, before transferring to play for the Fresno State Bulldogs in 2023. He tallied 83 tackles for the Bulldogs in 2023 before recording 63 tackles, two sacks and an interception in his last year, 2024. In his collegiate career, Clark had five interceptions and posted 14 pass breakups.

== Professional career ==
Pre-draft measurables
Height	Weight	Arm length	Hand span	Wingspan	40-yard dash	10-yard split	20-yard split	20-yard shuttle	Three-cone drill	Vertical jump	Broad jump	Bench press
6 ft 0 3/8 in (1.84 m)	208 lb (94 kg)	31 1/4 in (0.79 m)	9 5/8 in (0.24 m)	6 ft 4 3/4 in (1.95 m)	4.51 s	1.59 s	2.68 s	4.09 s	7.09 s	41.0 in (1.04 m)	11 ft 0 in (3.35 m)	19 reps
All values from Pro Day

=== New York Jets ===
After going unselected in the 2025 NFL draft, Clark signed with the New York Jets as an undrafted free agent. He was waived on August 26, 2025, and re-signed to the practice squad the next day. Clark was elevated to the active roster for the team's Week 3 game against the Tampa Bay Buccaneers. He was signed to the active roster on November 5.

On August 30, 2026, Clark was waived by the Jets as a part of final roster cuts.

=== Philadelphia Eagles ===
On October 14, 2026, Clark signed with the Philadelphia Eagles practice squad. On October 27, he was released.
