= Niceville, Florida =

- City
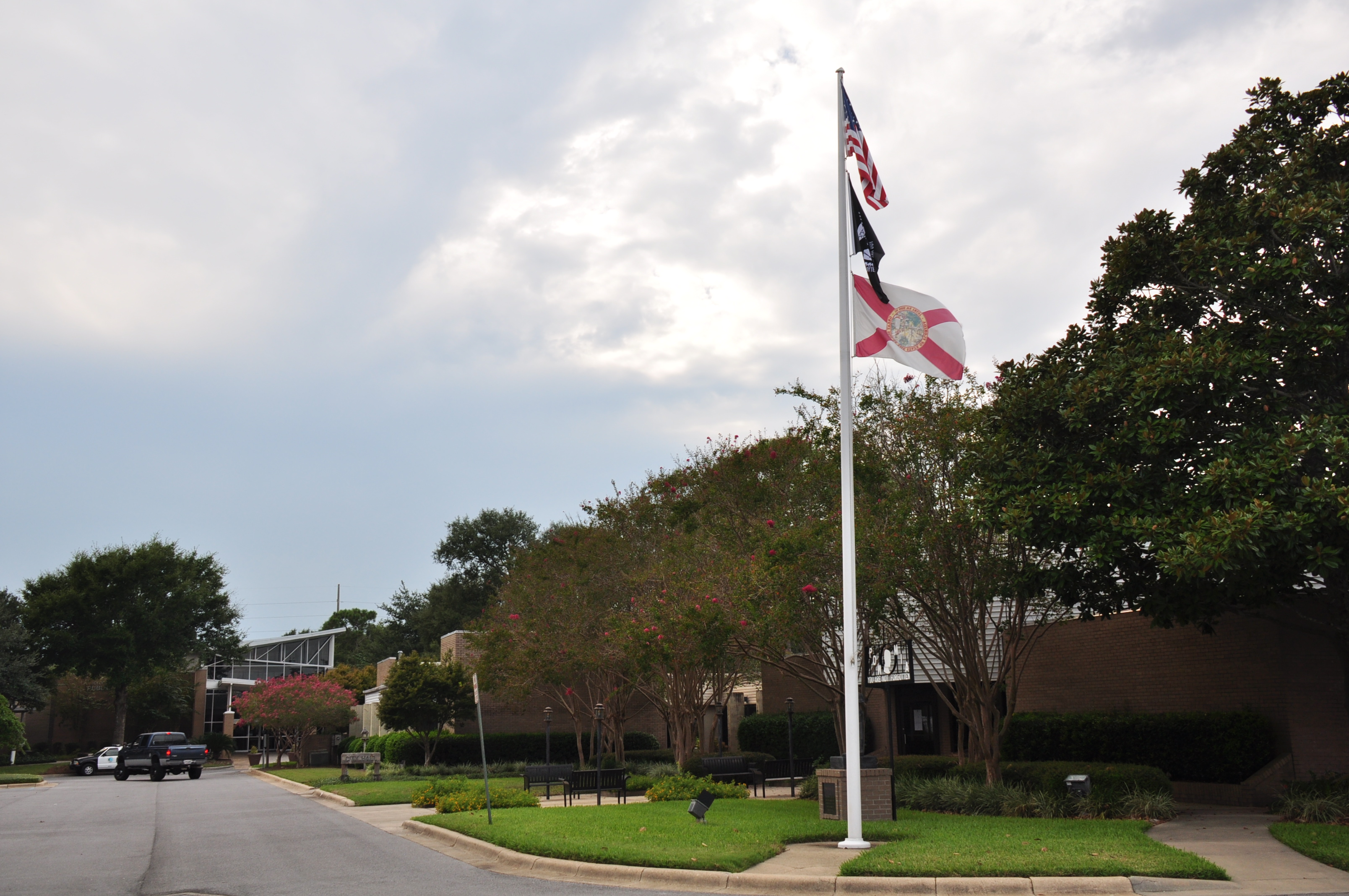
- Niceville City Hall, September 2014

- Seal

- Location in Okaloosa County and the state of Florida
- Coordinates: 30°31′40″N 86°29′18″W
- Country: United States
- State: Florida
- County: Okaloosa

Area
  - Total: 14.92 sq mi (38.63 km^{2})
  - Land: 14.41 sq mi (37.33 km^{2})
  - Water: 0.50 sq mi (1.30 km^{2})
- Elevation: 75 ft (23 m)

Population (2020)
  - Total: 15,772
  - Density: 1,094.2/sq mi (422.49/km^{2})
- Time zone: UTC-6 (Central (CST))
  - Summer (DST): UTC-5 (CDT)
- ZIP codes: 32578, 32588
- Area code: 850
- FIPS code: 12-48750
- GNIS feature ID: 2404378
- Website: www.cityofniceville.org

Niceville is a city in Okaloosa County, Florida, United States, located near Eglin Air Force Base on Boggy Bayou that opens into Choctawhatchee Bay. It is part of the Crestview-Fort Walton Beach-Destin, Florida Metropolitan Statistical Area. The population was 15,772 at the 2020 census, up from 12,749 at the 2010 census.

== History ==
When mail service began on July 21, 1868, the city was known as Boggy, and on November 5, 1910, the name was officially changed to Niceville. The name Niceville was selected by the postmaster's daughter. In 1915, Niceville became part of newly formed Okaloosa County after previously being in Walton County. It is a twin city along with Valparaiso, which borders it on the west side of the city.

== Geography ==
According to the United States Census Bureau, the city has a total area of 11.3 square miles (29 km^{2}), of which 10.9 square miles (28 km^{2}) is land and 0.4 square miles (1.0 km^{2}) is water.

=== Climate ===
Climate data for Niceville, Florida, 1991–2020 normals, extremes 1937–present
Month	Jan	Feb	Mar	Apr	May	Jun	Jul	Aug	Sep	Oct	Nov	Dec	Year
Record high °F (°C)	80 (27)	87 (31)	96 (36)	92 (33)	101 (38)	102 (39)	107 (42)	103 (39)	102 (39)	99 (37)	89 (32)	84 (29)	107 (42)
Mean maximum °F (°C)	72.3 (22.4)	74.9 (23.8)	80.7 (27.1)	83.4 (28.6)	91.1 (32.8)	94.0 (34.4)	95.6 (35.3)	95.1 (35.1)	93.2 (34.0)	88.8 (31.6)	81.1 (27.3)	75.0 (23.9)	97.0 (36.1)
Mean daily maximum °F (°C)	61.2 (16.2)	64.7 (18.2)	70.2 (21.2)	76.2 (24.6)	83.5 (28.6)	88.2 (31.2)	89.9 (32.2)	89.7 (32.1)	87.1 (30.6)	80.2 (26.8)	70.7 (21.5)	63.8 (17.7)	77.1 (25.1)
Daily mean °F (°C)	49.6 (9.8)	52.8 (11.6)	58.3 (14.6)	64.6 (18.1)	72.4 (22.4)	78.8 (26.0)	80.8 (27.1)	80.6 (27.0)	77.3 (25.2)	68.4 (20.2)	57.9 (14.4)	52.4 (11.3)	66.2 (19.0)
Mean daily minimum °F (°C)	38.0 (3.3)	40.8 (4.9)	46.4 (8.0)	53.0 (11.7)	61.4 (16.3)	69.4 (20.8)	71.7 (22.1)	71.5 (21.9)	67.6 (19.8)	56.5 (13.6)	45.1 (7.3)	41.0 (5.0)	55.2 (12.9)
Mean minimum °F (°C)	21.0 (−6.1)	24.7 (−4.1)	30.0 (−1.1)	38.3 (3.5)	47.9 (8.8)	62.5 (16.9)	67.3 (19.6)	66.3 (19.1)	55.6 (13.1)	39.5 (4.2)	29.9 (−1.2)	25.4 (−3.7)	19.9 (−6.7)
Record low °F (°C)	4 (−16)	11 (−12)	19 (−7)	20 (−7)	38 (3)	48 (9)	55 (13)	55 (13)	37 (3)	27 (−3)	18 (−8)	8 (−13)	4 (−16)
Average precipitation inches (mm)	5.86 (149)	5.25 (133)	5.35 (136)	5.99 (152)	3.78 (96)	6.79 (172)	8.91 (226)	9.21 (234)	6.97 (177)	4.60 (117)	4.97 (126)	5.68 (144)	73.36 (1,862)
Average precipitation days (≥ 0.01 in)	10.0	9.6	7.9	7.6	7.2	12.5	14.6	14.9	9.9	6.3	7.0	11.2	118.7
Source: NOAA

== Demographics ==
Historical population
Census	Pop.	Note	%±
1940	948		—
1950	2,497		163.4%
1960	4,517		80.9%
1970	4,155		−8.0%
1980	8,543		105.6%
1990	10,507		23.0%
2000	11,684		11.2%
2010	12,749		9.1%
2020	15,772		23.7%
U.S. Decennial Census

=== Racial and ethnic composition ===
Niceville racial composition (Hispanics excluded from racial categories) (NH = Non-Hispanic)
Race	Pop 2010	Pop 2020	% 2010	% 2020
White (NH)	10,704	11,922	83.96%	75.59%
Black or African American (NH)	519	721	4.07%	4.57%
Native American or Alaska Native (NH)	65	49	0.51%	0.31%
Asian (NH)	400	549	3.14%	3.48%
Pacific Islander or Native Hawaiian (NH)	11	36	0.09%	0.23%
Some other race (NH)	23	79	0.18%	0.50%
Two or more races/Multiracial (NH)	427	1,135	3.35%	7.20%
Hispanic or Latino (any race)	600	1,281	4.71%	8.12%
Total	12,749	15,772		

=== 2020 census ===
As of the 2020 census, Niceville had a population of 15,772. The median age was 40.2 years. 23.3% of residents were under the age of 18 and 17.5% of residents were 65 years of age or older. For every 100 females there were 98.2 males, and for every 100 females age 18 and over there were 96.2 males age 18 and over.

99.1% of residents lived in urban areas, while 0.9% lived in rural areas.

There were 6,246 households in Niceville, of which 32.8% had children under the age of 18 living in them. Of all households, 54.9% were married-couple households, 16.9% were households with a male householder and no spouse or partner present, and 23.3% were households with a female householder and no spouse or partner present. About 24.1% of all households were made up of individuals and 10.5% had someone living alone who was 65 years of age or older.

There were 6,650 housing units, of which 6.1% were vacant. The homeowner vacancy rate was 1.2% and the rental vacancy rate was 8.9%.

There were 4,153 families residing in the city.

=== 2010 census ===
As of the 2010 census, there were 12,749 people, 5,245 households, and 3,933 families residing in the city.

=== 2000 census ===
As of census of 2000, there were 11,684 people, 4,637 households, and 3,385 families living in the city. The population density was 1,069.8 inhabitants per square mile (413.1/km^{2}). There were 4,907 housing units at an average density of 449.3 per square mile (173.5/km^{2}). The racial makeup of the city was 87.25% White, 4.58% African American, 0.74% Native American, 3.20% Asian, 0.11% Pacific Islander, 1.14% from other races, and 2.99% from two or more races. Hispanic or Latino of any race were 3.71% of the population.

Of the 4,637 households in 2000, 31.5% had children under the age of 18 living with them, 59.3% were married couples living together, 10.0% had a female householder with no husband present, and 27.0% were non-families. 21.8% of households were one person and 7.8% were one person aged 65 or older. The average household size was 2.49 and the average family size was 2.89.

In 2000, the age distribution was 23.0% under the age of 18, 9.4% from 18 to 24, 27.4% from 25 to 44, 27.2% from 45 to 64, and 12.9% 65 or older. The median age was 39 years. For every 100 females, there were 97.3 males. For every 100 females age 18 and over, there were 94.1 males.

In 2000, the median household income was $45,685 and the median family income was $51,627. Males had a median income of $34,583 versus $20,987 for females. The per capita income for the city was $20,175. About 7.2% of families and 9.6% of the population were below the poverty line, including 13.8% of those under age 18 and 9.4% of those age 65 or over.

== Education ==
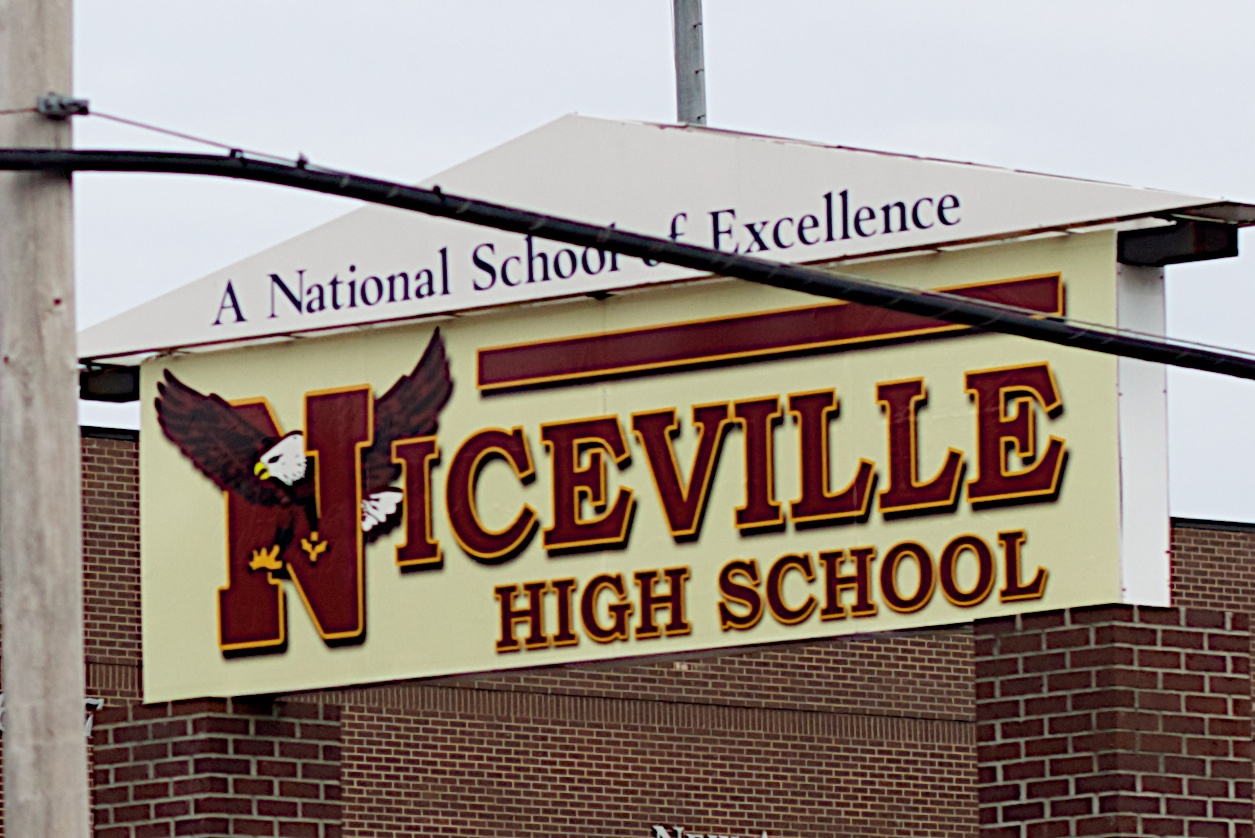
Niceville High School

It is in the Okaloosa County School District.

School district-operated public schools:

- Bluewater Elementary
- James E. Plew Elementary
- Lula J. Edge Elementary
- Addie R. Lewis Middle School
- C.W. Ruckel Middle School
- Niceville High School

Charter schools:

- Collegiate High School at Northwest Florida State College

Private school:

- Rocky Bayou Christian School

Colleges and universities:

- Northwest Florida State College

== Arts and culture ==
The Boggy Fest, previously known as the Boggy Bayou Mullet Festival, was held annually in Niceville.

== Notable people ==
- Anna Banks, author
- Jason Craig, comic book artist
- Roy Finch, football player
- Matt Gaetz, former U.S. Representative for Florida's 1st congressional district, lives here
- Rece Hinds, baseball player
- Shin Hyun-joon, South Korean diplomat, military officer, retired here
- Jarret Johnson, football player
- Cris Judd, actor
- Louis C. Menetrey, Army general
- Jimmy Nelson, baseball pitcher
- Pam Oliver, sportscaster
- Julian Pittman, football player
- Conrad Ricamora, actor
- Alan Ritchson, actor
- Tony Sipp, baseball player
- Toby Turner, YouTuber known as Tobuscus
