= 2026 New York Jets season =

67th season in franchise history; 57th season in the NFL

- Owner: Woody and Christopher Johnson
- General manager: Darren Mougey
- President: Hymie Elhai
- Head coach: Aaron Glenn
- Offensive coordinator: Frank Reich
- Defensive coordinator: Brian Duker
- Home stadium: MetLife Stadium

Results
- Record: 3–8
- Division place: 3rd AFC East

Uniform
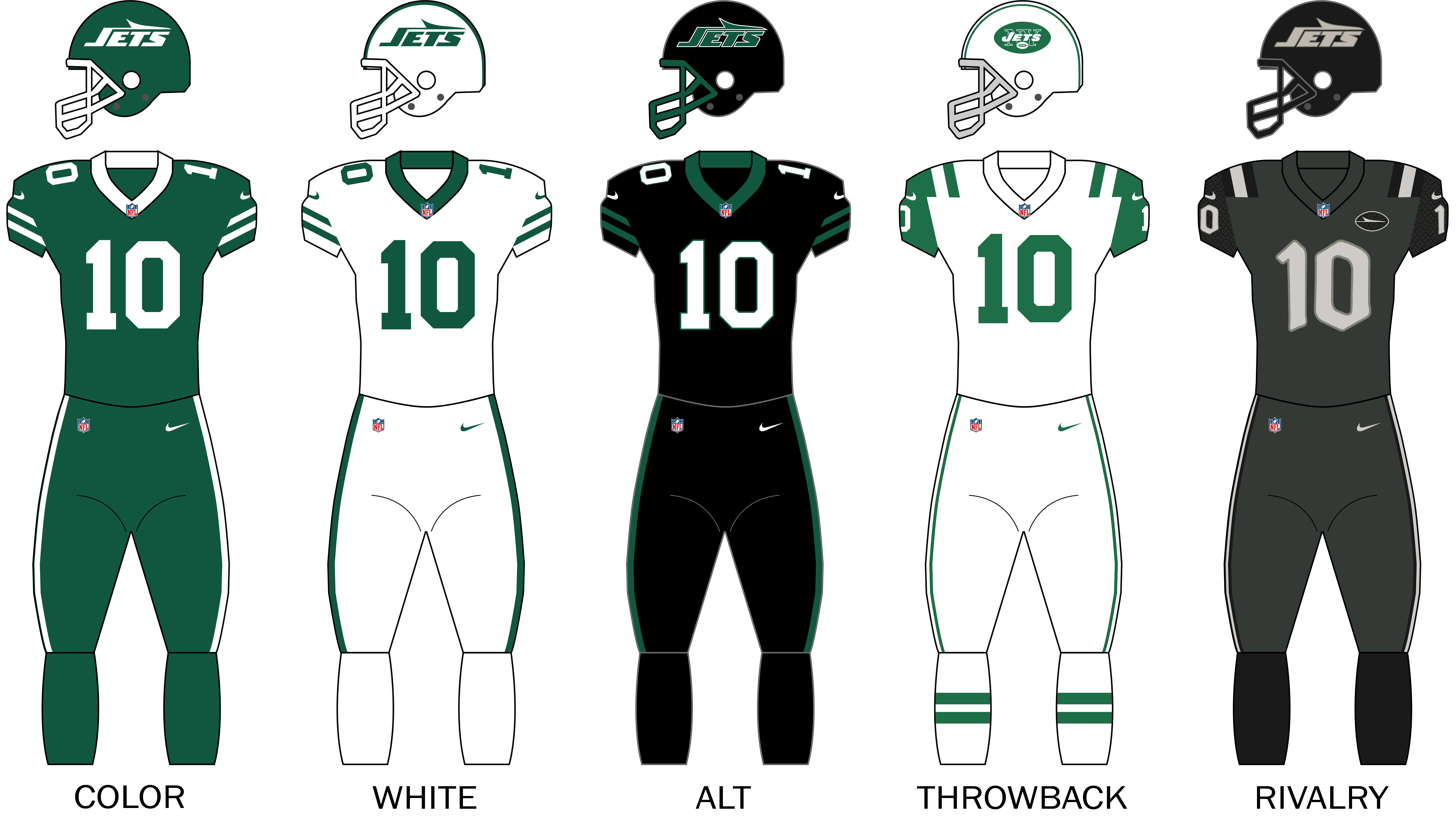

The 2026 season is the New York Jets' 57th in the National Football League (NFL), their 67th overall and their second under general manager Darren Mougey and head coach Aaron Glenn. They are attempting to improve on their 3–14 record from 2025, make the playoffs after a 15-year absence, end their 23-year AFC East title drought, and put an end to 10 consecutive losing records. They opened their 2026 campaign by beating the Titans, led by their former head coach Robert Saleh, on the road, 23–10, to win their first season opener since the 2023 season. If the Jets can win one more time, they will match their 3–14 record from the previous season.

The Jets defense recorded their first interception since Week 18 of the 2024 season during Week 4.

== Offseason ==
=== Draft ===
2026 New York Jets draft selections
Round	Selection	Player	Position	College	Notes
1	2	David Bailey	LB	Texas Tech	
1	16	Kenyon Sadiq	TE	Oregon	From Colts
1	30	Omar Cooper Jr.	WR	Indiana	From Broncos via Dolphins and 49ers
2	33	Traded to the San Francisco 49ers			
2	44	Traded to the Detroit Lions			From Cowboys
2	50	D'Angelo Ponds	CB	Indiana	From Lions
3	68	Traded to the Philadelphia Eagles			
4	103	Darrell Jackson Jr.	DT	Florida State	
4	110	Cade Klubnik	QB	Clemson	From Bengals
4	128	Traded to the Cincinnati Bengals			From Texans via Lions
4	140	Traded to the Cincinnati Bengals			Compensatory selection
5	142	Traded to the Baltimore Ravens			
5	179	Traded to the San Francisco 49ers			Compensatory selection
6	182	Traded to the Cleveland Browns			
6	188	Anez Cooper	G	Miami (FL)	From Browns via Seahawks
6	194	Traded to the Tennessee Titans			From Ravens
6	199	Traded to the Seattle Seahawks			From Lions via Browns and Bengals
6	208	Traded to the Las Vegas Raiders			From Bills
6	211	Traded to the Minnesota Vikings			From Broncos
7	220	Traded to the Buffalo Bills			
7	228	VJ Payne	S	Kansas State	From Cowboys via Bills and Raiders
7	238	Traded to the Miami Dolphins			From Chargers via Titans
7	242	Traded to the Seattle Seahawks			From Bills via Browns

2026 New York Jets undrafted free agents
Name	Position	College	Ref.
Mory Bamba	CB	BYU	
Kendrick Blackshire	LB	UTSA	
Chase Curtis	TE	TCU	
Will Ferrin	K	BYU	
Garrison Grimes	LS	BYU	
Xavier Hill	OL	Colorado	
Caullin Lacy	WR	Louisville	
Malik McClain	WR	Arizona State	
DT Sheffield	WR	Rutgers	
Sam Scott	RB	Wyoming	
Chip Trayanum	RB	Toledo	
Nathan Voorhis	DE	Ball State	
Jaden Keller	LB	Virginia Tech	

Draft trades

== Staff ==
New York Jets staff
Front office: Owner/chairman/CEO – Woody Johnson; Vice chairman – Christopher Johnson; President – Hymie Elhai; Executive vice president/COO – Brian Friedman; General manager – Darren Mougey; Senior director of football operations – Dan Zbojovsky; Senior director of football administration – Nick Sabella; Senior personnel/special projects – Jon Carr, TJ McCreight, Adam Engroff; Director of player personnel – Robbie Paton; Director of pro scouting – Evan Ardoin; Director of college scouting – Jay Mandolesi; Director, football analytics and strategy – Sean Clement; Player personnel research and analytics – Brian Shields; Senior football advisor – Rick Spielman; Manager, personnel operations - Destiny Rodriguez; Coordinator, Scouting strategy – Donovan Doyle; Head coaches: Head coach – Aaron Glenn; Offensive coaches: Offensive coordinator – Frank Reich; Pass game coordinator – Seth Ryan; Quarterbacks – Bill Musgrave; Running backs – Nic McKissic-Luke; Wide receivers – Shawn Jefferson; Tight ends – Alfredo Roberts; Offensive line – Steve Heiden; Assistant offensive line – Al Netter; Assistant offensive line – Brian Natkin; Offensive assistant/assistant quarterbacks – Thomas Merkle; Offensive assistant – Matthew Sargent; Offensive assistant – Junior Taylor	Defensive coaches: Defensive coordinator – Brian Duker; Defensive line – Karl Dunbar; Assistant defensive line – Cameron Davis; Linebackers – Ben Bolling; Assistant linebackers – Nathaniel Willingham; Defensive backs/pass game coordinator – Chris Harris; Safeties – Ryan Slowik; Defensive assistant/nickels – Ronald Booker; Defensive assistant – Collin Bauer; Special teams coaches: Special teams coordinator – Chris Banjo; Special teams assistant – Kevin O'Dea; Support staff: Game management – Jon Berger; Coordinator, Coaching operations – Madilyn Johnson; Strength and conditioning: Head strength and conditioning – Corey Smith; Assistant strength and conditioning – Brian Johnson; Assistant strength and conditioning – Thomas Myslinski; → Coaching staff → Front office → More NFL staffs

== Current roster ==
New York Jets roster
Quarterbacks (QB): 10 Cade Klubnik; 7 Geno Smith; Running backs (RB): 0 Braelon Allen; 47 Andrew Beck FB; 32 Isaiah Davis; 20 Breece Hall; 3 Kene Nwangwu KR; Wide receivers (WR): 11 Omar Cooper Jr.; 84 Malik McClain; 15 Adonai Mitchell; 17 Tim Patrick; 18 Isaiah Williams PR; 5 Garrett Wilson; Tight ends (TE): 89 Jeremy Ruckert; 16 Kenyon Sadiq; 85 Mason Taylor; 86 Jelani Woods	Offensive linemen (OL): 74 Olu Fashanu T; 70 Armand Membou T; 76 Blake Freeland T; 67 Jordan Meredith C; 71 Josh Myers C; 79 Chukwuma Okorafor T; 64 Dylan Parham G; 66 Joe Tippmann G; Defensive linemen (DL): 91 Jowon Briggs DE; 96 Jack Heflin DE; 95 Darrell Jackson Jr. DT; 98 Payton Page DT; 97 Harrison Phillips DE	Linebackers (LB): 31 David Bailey OLB; 56 Demario Davis MLB; 52 Kingsley Enagbare OLB; 48 Jaden Keller MLB; 92 Nate Lynn OLB; 9 Will McDonald IV OLB; 46 Joseph Ossai OLB; 50 Troy Reeder MLB; 44 Jamien Sherwood MLB; 49 Trevin Wallace MLB; Defensive backs (DB): 6 Dane Belton SS; 2 Jarvis Brownlee Jr. CB; 29 Minkah Fitzpatrick FS; 27 Malachi Moore FS; 34 VJ Payne FS; 23 D'Angelo Ponds CB; 21 Brandon Stephens CB; 37 Qwan'tez Stiggers CB; 1 Azareye'h Thomas CB; 26 Nahshon Wright CB; Special teams (ST): 42 Thomas Hennessy LS; 14 Austin McNamara P; 19 Jason Sanders K	Practice squad: 38 Mory Bamba CB; 75 Brant Banks T; 43 Quinton Bell OLB; 33 Jordan Clark CB; 53 Nick Dawkins C; 54 Paschal Ekeji OLB (IPP); 36 Al-Jay Henderson RB; -- Kohl Levao G; 4 Will Levis QB; 58 Isaiahh Loudermilk DE; 83 Joseph Manjack WR; 78 Amari McNeill DT; 65 Jimmy Morrissey C; 81 Jamaal Pritchett WR; 87 Sterling Shepard WR; 45 Mykal Walker MLB; 22 Samuel Womack CB; Reserve: 94 Tyler Baron OLB (PUP); 61 Max Mitchell T (IR); 72 Anez Cooper G (IR/DFR); 57 Kingsley Jonathan OLB (IR); 51 Francisco Mauigoa MLB (IR); 41 Marcelino McCrary-Ball MLB (IR); 55 Braiden McGregor OLB (IR); 93 David Onyemata DE (IR); 82 Arian Smith WR (IR); 99 T'Vondre Sweat DT (IR); 40 Chip Trayanum RB (IR) 53 active, 16 practice squad (1 IPP), 11 reserve As of November 17, 2026. Rookies in italics.; Roster; Depth chart; Transactions

== Preseason ==
Week	Date	Opponent	Result	Record	Venue	Recap
1	August 14	Tampa Bay Buccaneers	L 16–24	0–1	MetLife Stadium	Recap
2	August 21	at Pittsburgh Steelers	W 17–0	1–1	Acrisure Stadium	Recap
3	August 28	New York Giants	L 6–23	1–2	MetLife Stadium	Recap

== Regular season ==
=== Schedule ===
Week	Date	Time (ET)	Opponent	Result	Record	Venue	Network	Recap
1	September 13	1:00 p.m.	at Tennessee Titans	**W** 23–10	1–0	Nissan Stadium	CBS	Recap
2	September 20	1:00 p.m.	Green Bay Packers	**L** 17–20 (OT)	1–1	MetLife Stadium	Fox	Recap
3	September 27	1:00 p.m.	at Detroit Lions	**L** 24–31	1–2	Ford Field	Fox	Recap
4	October 4	1:00 p.m.	at Chicago Bears	**L** 12–23	1–3	Soldier Field	Fox	Recap
5	October 11	1:00 p.m.	Cleveland Browns	**W** 17–12	2–3	MetLife Stadium	CBS	Recap
6	October 18	1:00 p.m.	at **New England Patriots**	**L** 19–26	2–4	Gillette Stadium	CBS	Recap
7	October 25	1:00 p.m.	**Miami Dolphins**	**L** 25–28	2–5	MetLife Stadium	CBS	Recap
8	November 1	1:00 p.m.	Las Vegas Raiders	**L** 33–38	2–6	MetLife Stadium	Fox	Recap
9	November 8	1:00 p.m.	at Kansas City Chiefs	**L** 12–35	2–7	Arrowhead Stadium	CBS	Recap
10	November 15	1:00 p.m.	**Buffalo Bills**	**L** 12–31	2–8	MetLife Stadium	CBS	Recap
11	November 22	4:05 p.m.	at Los Angeles Chargers	**W** 27–24	3–8	SoFi Stadium	Fox	Recap
12	November 29	1:00 p.m.	at **Miami Dolphins**			Hard Rock Stadium	CBS	
13	Bye							
14	December 13	1:00 p.m.	Denver Broncos			MetLife Stadium	CBS	
15	December 20	4:05 p.m.	at Arizona Cardinals			State Farm Stadium	Fox	
16	December 27	1:00 p.m.	**New England Patriots**			MetLife Stadium	CBS	
17	January 3	1:00 p.m.	Minnesota Vikings			MetLife Stadium	CBS	
18	January 9/10	TBD	at **Buffalo Bills**			Highmark Stadium	TBD	

Notes

- Intra-division opponents are in **bold** text.
- Networks, dates and times from Weeks 14–17 are subject to change as a result of flexible scheduling.
- The date, time and network for Week 18 will be finalized at the end of Week 17.

=== Game summaries ===
==== Week 1: at Tennessee Titans ====
Week 1: New York Jets at Tennessee Titans – Game summary

Quarter	1	2	3	4	Total
**Jets**	7	3	10	3	**23**
Titans	3	0	0	7	**10**

at Nissan Stadium, Nashville, Tennessee

- Date: September 13
- Game time: 1:00 p.m. EDT/12:00 p.m. CDT
- Game weather: Cloudy, 90 °F (32 °C)
- Game attendance: 64,336
- Referee: Land Clark
- TV announcers (CBS): Spero Dedes, Adam Archuleta and Aditi Kinkhabwala
- Recap, Game Book

Game information

**First quarter**

- NYJ – Kenyon Sadiq 3-yard run (Jason Sanders kick), 10:45. Jets 7–0. **Drive: 8 plays, 60 yards, 4:15.**
- TEN – Joey Slye 42-yard field goal, 5:03. Jets 7–3. **Drive: 12 plays, 41 yards, 5:42.**

**Second quarter**

- NYJ – Jason Sanders 33-yard field goal, 5:03. Jets 10–3. **Drive: 19 plays, 74 yards, 11:48.**

**Third quarter**

- NYJ – Breece Hall 4-yard run (Jason Sanders kick), 9:41. Jets 17–3. **Drive: 5 plays, 80 yards, 3:20.**
- NYJ – Jason Sanders 51-yard field goal, 4:33. Jets 20–3. **Drive: 7 plays, 46 yards, 4:05.**

**Fourth quarter**

- NYJ – Jason Sanders 51-yard field goal, 5:00. Jets 23–3. **Drive: 5 plays, 19 yards, 3:01.**
- TEN – Elic Ayomanor 11-yard pass from Cam Ward (Joey Slye kick), 2:42. Jets 23–10. **Drive: 9 plays, 65 yards, 2:18.**

**Top passers**

- NYJ – Geno Smith – 19/24, 215 yards
- TEN – Cam Ward – 19/32, 140 yards, TD

**Top rushers**

- NYJ – Breece Hall – 22 rushes, 102 yards, TD
- TEN – Tony Pollard – 7 rushes, 35 yards

**Top receivers**

- NYJ – Garrett Wilson – 6 receptions, 79 yards
- TEN – Wan'Dale Robinson – 5 receptions, 38 yards

The Jets started 1–0 for the first time since 2023. With the Giants upsetting the Cowboys later in the day, it would be the first time both New York teams would win their opening game since 2009.

==== Week 2: vs. Green Bay Packers ====
Week 2: Green Bay Packers at New York Jets – Game summary

Quarter	1	2	3	4	OT	Total
**Packers**	0	7	0	10	3	**20**
Jets	0	7	7	3	0	**17**

at MetLife Stadium, East Rutherford, New Jersey

- Date: September 20
- Game time: 1:00 p.m. EDT
- Game weather: Drizzle, 69 °F (21 °C)
- Game attendance: 78,674
- Referee: Scott Novak
- TV announcers (Fox): Kenny Albert, Jonathan Vilma and Megan Olivi
- Recap, Game Book

Game information

**First quarter**

- No scoring plays

**Second quarter**

- GB – MarShawn Lloyd 6-yard pass from Jordan Love (Trey Smack kick), 9:35. Packers 7–0. **Drive: 9 plays, 64 yards, 5:27.**
- NYJ – Braelon Allen 5-yard run (Jason Sanders kick), 6:04. Tied 7–7. **Drive: 7 plays, 70 yards, 3:31.**

**Third quarter**

- NYJ – Garrett Wilson 5-yard pass from Geno Smith (Jason Sanders kick), 2:30. Jets 14–7. **Drive: 10 plays, 70 yards, 5:00.**

**Fourth quarter**

- NYJ – Jason Sanders 32-yard field goal, 11:04. Jets 17–7. **Drive: 4 plays, 4 yards, 1:23.**
- GB – Christian Watson 3-yard pass from Jordan Love (Trey Smack kick), 7:58. Jets 17–14. **Drive: 7 plays, 73 yards, 3:06.**
- GB – Trey Smack 34-yard field goal, 2:59. Tied 17–17. **Drive: 4 plays, 3 yards, 1:33.**

**Overtime**

- GB – Trey Smack 26-yard field goal, 5:23. Packers 20–17. **Drive: 5 plays, 58 yards, 2:06.**

**Top passers**

- GB – Jordan Love – 16/29, 145 yards, 2 TD
- NYJ – Geno Smith – 27/41, 247 yards, TD

**Top rushers**

- GB – Kaleb Johnson – 8 rushes, 32 yards
- NYJ – Breece Hall – 16 rushes, 29 yards

**Top receivers**

- GB – Matthew Golden – 4 receptions, 58 yards
- NYJ – Breece Hall – 5 receptions, 63 yards

Despite leading 17–7, the Jets surrendered 14 unanswered points and then gave up the game winning field goal from Trey Smack. As a result, the Jets once again failed to beat the Packers at home, not having done so since 2002 and, instead of their first 2–0 start since 2015, the Jets fell to 1–1.

==== Week 3: at Detroit Lions ====
Week 3: New York Jets at Detroit Lions – Game summary

Quarter	1	2	3	4	Total
Jets	0	7	3	14	**24**
**Lions**	0	10	7	14	**31**

at Ford Field, Detroit, Michigan

- Date: September 27
- Game time: 1:00 p.m. EDT
- Game weather: None (indoor stadium)
- Game attendance: 63,193
- Referee: Brad Rogers
- TV announcers (Fox): Adam Amin, Drew Brees and Kristina Pink
- Recap, Game Book

Game information

**First quarter**

- No scoring plays

**Second quarter**

- DET – Jake Bates 30-yard field goal, 9:35. Lions 3–0. **Drive: 9 plays, 49 yards, 5:16.**
- NYJ – Kenyon Sadiq 24-yard pass from Geno Smith (Jason Sanders kick), 5:33. Jets 7–3. **Drive: 7 plays, 74 yards, 4:02.**
- DET – Amon-Ra St. Brown 4-yard pass from Jared Goff (Jake Bates kick), 1:36. Lions 10–7. **Drive: 12 plays, 53 yards, 3:57.**

**Third quarter**

- DET – Jahmyr Gibbs 17-yard run (Jake Bates kick), 10:56. Lions 17–7. **Drive: 7 plays, 80 yards, 4:04.**
- NYJ – Jason Sanders 42-yard field goal, 6:22. Lions 17–10. **Drive: 8 plays, 44 yards, 4:34.**

**Fourth quarter**

- DET – Jahmyr Gibbs 1-yard run (Jake Bates kick), 14:57. Lions 24–10. **Drive: 11 plays, 62 yards, 6:25.**
- NYJ – Jeremy Ruckert 4-yard pass from Geno Smith (pass failed), 11:17. Lions 24–16. **Drive: 9 plays, 80 yards, 3:40.**
- NYJ – Garrett Wilson 23-yard pass from Geno Smith (Geno Smith–Sterling Shepard pass), 4:06. Tied 24–24. **Drive: 8 plays, 54 yards, 4:26.**
- DET – Jahmyr Gibbs 11-yard pass from Jared Goff (Jake Bates kick), 2:25. Lions 31–24. **Drive: 4 plays, 65 yards, 1:41.**

**Top passers**

- NYJ – Geno Smith – 31/37, 321 yards, 3 TD
- DET – Jared Goff – 25/32, 269 yards, 2 TD

**Top rushers**

- NYJ – Breece Hall – 13 rushes, 32 yards
- DET – Jahmyr Gibbs – 20 rushes, 99 yards, 2 TD

**Top receivers**

- NYJ – Garrett Wilson – 10 receptions, 107 yards, TD
- DET – Isaac TeSlaa – 3 receptions, 66 yards

This marked the Jets' first road loss to the Lions since 1997.

==== Week 4: at Chicago Bears ====
Week 4: New York Jets at Chicago Bears – Game summary

Quarter	1	2	3	4	Total
Jets	0	3	3	6	**12**
**Bears**	7	6	7	3	**23**

at Soldier Field, Chicago, Illinois

- Date: October 4
- Game time: 1:00 p.m. EDT/12:00 p.m. CDT
- Game weather: Sunny, 72 °F (22 °C)
- Game attendance: 59,702
- Referee: Carl Cheffers
- TV announcers (Fox): Tim Brando, Drew Brees and Kristina Pink
- Recap, Game Book

Game information

**First quarter**

- CHI – Kyle Monangai 1-yard run (Cairo Santos kick), 0:23. Bears 7–0. **Drive: 12 plays, 57 yards, 7:01.**

**Second quarter**

- NYJ – Jason Sanders 36-yard field goal, 8:15. Bears 7–3. **Drive: 6 plays, 16 yards, 3:27.**
- CHI – Cairo Santos 30-yard field goal, 2:29. Bears 10–3. **Drive: 11 plays, 59 yards, 5:46.**
- CHI – Cairo Santos 30-yard field goal, 0:00. Bears 13–3. **Drive: 11 plays, 69 yards, 1:44.**

**Third quarter**

- NYJ – Jason Sanders 30-yard field goal, 7:00. Bears 13–6. **Drive: 5 plays, 16 yards, 1:46.**
- CHI – Kyle Monangai 5-yard run (Cairo Santos kick), 2:26. Bears 20–6. **Drive: 9 plays, 72 yards, 4:34.**

**Fourth quarter**

- CHI – Cairo Santos 21-yard field goal, 10:01. Bears 23–6. **Drive: 11 plays, 77 yards, 5:56.**
- NYJ – Isaiah Williams 58-yard pass from Geno Smith (kick failed), 9:16. Bears 23–12. **Drive: 2 plays, 72 yards, 0:45.**

**Top passers**

- NYJ – Geno Smith – 8/15, 119 yards, TD
- CHI – Tyson Bagent – 25/34, 268 yards, INT

**Top rushers**

- NYJ – Braelon Allen – 14 rushes, 59 yards
- CHI – Kyle Monangai – 30 rushes, 146 yards, 2 TD

**Top receivers**

- NYJ – Isaiah Williams – 2 receptions, 73 yards, TD
- CHI – Rome Odunze – 6 receptions, 94 yards

The Jets recorded their first interception since Week 18 of the 2024 season, ending a 20-game streak of catching none.

==== Week 5: vs. Cleveland Browns ====
Week 5: Cleveland Browns at New York Jets – Game summary

Quarter	1	2	3	4	Total
Browns	3	3	0	6	**12**
**Jets**	7	0	0	10	**17**

at MetLife Stadium, East Rutherford, New Jersey

- Date: October 11
- Game time: 1:00 p.m. EDT
- Game weather: Rain, 64 °F (18 °C)
- Game attendance: 67,418
- Referee: Bill Vinovich
- TV announcers (CBS): Andrew Catalon, Logan Ryan and AJ Ross
- Recap, Game Book

Game information

**First quarter**

- NYJ – Garrett Wilson 32-yard pass from Geno Smith (Jason Sanders kick), 9:17. Jets 7–0. **Drive: 8 plays, 80 yards, 3:32.**
- CLE – Andre Szmyt 25-yard field goal, 3:27. Jets 7–3. **Drive: 12 plays, 67 yards, 5:50.**

**Second quarter**

- CLE – Andre Szmyt 41-yard field goal, 10:14. Jets 7–6. **Drive: 9 plays, 31 yards, 3:10.**

**Third quarter**

- No scoring plays

**Fourth quarter**

- NYJ – Jason Sanders 54-yard field goal, 14:37. Jets 10–6. **Drive: 9 plays, 27 yards, 4:01.**
- CLE – Denzel Boston 29-yard pass from Deshaun Watson (kick failed), 6:15. Browns 12–10. **Drive: 9 plays, 86 yards, 4:23.**
- NYJ – Braelon Allen 22-yard run (Jason Sanders kick), 3:01. Jets 17–12. **Drive: 3 plays, 23 yards, 0:51.**

**Top passers**

- CLE – Deshaun Watson – 15/33, 155 yards, TD
- NYJ – Geno Smith – 17/30, 182 yards, TD

**Top rushers**

- CLE – Quinshon Judkins – 14 rushes, 44 yards
- NYJ – Braelon Allen – 24 rushes, 116 yards, TD

**Top receivers**

- CLE – Isaiah Bond – 3 receptions, 74 yards
- NYJ – Garrett Wilson – 7 receptions, 104 yards, TD

==== Week 6: at New England Patriots ====
Week 6: New York Jets at New England Patriots – Game summary

Quarter	1	2	3	4	Total
Jets	3	0	10	6	**19**
**Patriots**	7	10	0	9	**26**

at Gillette Stadium, Foxborough, Massachusetts

- Date: October 18
- Game time: 1:00 p.m. EDT
- Game weather: Sunny, 51 °F (11 °C)
- Game attendance: 64,628
- Referee: Clete Blakeman
- TV announcers (CBS): Spero Dedes, Adam Archuleta and Aditi Kinkhabwala
- Recap, Game Book

Game information

**First quarter**

- NYJ – Jason Sanders 42-yard field goal, 8:17. Jets 3–0. **Drive: 13 plays, 48 yards, 6:43.**
- NE – Romeo Doubs 42-yard pass from Drake Maye (Andy Borregales kick), 4:10. Patriots 7–3. **Drive: 2 plays, 42 yards, 0:12.**

**Second quarter**

- NE – Andy Borregales 32-yard field goal, 1:46. Patriots 10–3. **Drive: 12 plays, 47 yards, 5:11.**
- NE – DeMario Douglas 9-yard pass from Drake Maye (Andy Borregales kick), 0:14. Patriots 17–3. **Drive: 7 plays, 71 yards, 1:09.**

**Third quarter**

- NYJ – Omar Cooper Jr. 48-yard pass from Geno Smith (Jason Sanders kick), 10:24. Patriots 17–10. **Drive: 3 plays, 60 yards, 1:24.**
- NYJ – Jason Sanders 36-yard field goal, 4:46. Patriots 17–13. **Drive: 6 plays, 18 yards, 3:24.**

**Fourth quarter**

- NE – Hunter Henry 7-yard pass from Drake Maye (kick failed), 14:10. Patriots 23–13. **Drive: 12 plays, 68 yards, 5:36.**
- NYJ – Jason Sanders 40-yard field goal, 7:20. Patriots 23–16. **Drive: 9 plays, 33 yards, 3:38.**
- NE – Andy Borregales 27-yard field goal, 1:12. Patriots 26–16. **Drive: 13 plays, 51 yards, 6:08.**

**Top passers**

- NYJ – Geno Smith – 20/30, 252 yards, TD, INT
- NE – Drake Maye – 18/32, 235 yards, 3 TD

**Top rushers**

- NYJ – Braelon Allen – 17 rushes, 78 yards
- NE – Corey Kiner – 11 rushes, 57 yards

**Top receivers**

- NYJ – Omar Cooper Jr. – 6 receptions, 103 yards, TD
- NE – DeMario Douglas – 7 receptions, 86 yards, TD

==== Week 7: vs. Miami Dolphins ====
Week 7: Miami Dolphins at New York Jets – Game summary

Quarter	1	2	3	4	Total
**Dolphins**	14	7	0	7	**28**
Jets	7	0	7	11	**25**

at MetLife Stadium, East Rutherford, New Jersey

- Date: October 25
- Game time: 1:00 p.m. EDT
- Game weather: Sunny, 64 °F (18 °C)
- Game attendance: 72,456
- Referee: Brad Allen
- TV announcers (CBS): Spero Dedes, Adam Archuleta, and Aditi Kinkhabwala
- Recap, Game Book

Game information

**First quarter**

- MIA – Caleb Douglas 7-yard pass from Malik Willis (Zane Gonzalez kick), 10:53. Dolphins 7–0. **Drive: 7 plays, 76 yards, 4:07.**
- NYJ – Mason Taylor 13-yard pass from Geno Smith (Jason Sanders kick), 8:37. Tied 7–7. **Drive: 4 plays, 65 yards, 2:16.**
- MIA – Ollie Gordon II 1-yard run (Zane Gonzalez kick), 1:02. Dolphins 14–7. **Drive: 14 plays, 60 yards, 7:35.**

**Second quarter**

- MIA – Malik Willis 2-yard rush (Zane Gonzalez kick), 0:06. 21–7. **Drive: 15 plays, 91 yards, 8:38.**

**Third quarter**

- NYJ – Omar Cooper Jr. 3-yard pass from Geno Smith (Jason Sanders kick), 5:50. Dolphins 21–14. **Drive: 6 plays, 73 yards, 2:26.**

**Fourth quarter**

- NYJ – Jason Sanders 33-yard field goal, 8:57. Dolphins 21–17. **Drive: 12 plays, 68 yards, 6:10.**
- MIA – Caleb Douglas 63-yard pass from Malik Willis (Zane Gonzalez kick), 4:44. Dolphins 28–17. **Drive: 3 plays, 76 yards, 1:25.**
- NYJ – Mason Taylor 12-yard pass from Geno Smith (Geno Smith-Mason Taylor pass), 3:24. Dolphins 28–25. **Drive: 7 plays, 65 yards, 1:20.**

**Top passers**

- MIA – Malik Willis – 14/21, 208 yards, 2 TD
- NYJ – Geno Smith – 23/30, 287 yards, 3 TD, INT

**Top rushers**

- MIA – Ollie Gordon II – 25 rushes, 103 yards, TD
- NYJ – Braelon Allen – 17 rushes, 104 yards

**Top receivers**

- MIA – Greg Dulcich – 5 receptions, 86 yards
- NYJ – Omar Cooper Jr. – 5 receptions, 115 yards, TD

==== Week 8: vs. Las Vegas Raiders ====
Week 8: Las Vegas Raiders at New York Jets – Game summary

Quarter	1	2	3	4	Total
**Raiders**	7	7	14	10	**38**
Jets	6	17	7	3	**33**

at MetLife Stadium, East Rutherford, New Jersey

- Date: November 1
- Game time: 1:00 p.m. EST
- Game weather: Mostly sunny, 61 °F (16 °C)
- Game attendance: 70,080
- Referee: John Hussey
- TV announcers (Fox): Kenny Albert, Jonathan Vilma, and Megan Olivi
- Recap, Game Book

Game information

**First quarter**

- NYJ – Jason Sanders 21-yard field goal, 12:50. Jets 3–0. **Drive: 7 plays, 62 yards, 2:10.**
- LV – Brock Bowers 12-yard pass from Kirk Cousins (Matt Gay kick), 7:23. Raiders 7–3. **Drive: 10 plays, 60 yards, 5:27.**
- NYJ – Jason Sanders 36-yard field goal, 2:13. Raiders 7–6. **Drive: 12 plays, 48 yards, 5:10.**

**Second quarter**

- NYJ – Isaiah Williams 18-yard pass from Geno Smith (Jason Sanders kick), 10:56. Jets 13–7. **Drive: 8 plays, 70 yards, 3:51.**
- LV – Dylan Laube 95-yard kickoff return (Matt Gay kick), 10:44. Raiders 14–13.
- NYJ – Adonai Mitchell 12-yard pass from Geno Smith (Jason Sanders kick), 6:18. Jets 20–14. **Drive: 8 plays, 65 yards, 4:26.**
- NYJ – Jason Sanders 39-yard field goal, 0:09. Jets 23–14. **Drive: 9 plays, 33 yards, 3:40.**

**Third quarter**

- LV – Brock Bowers 2-yard pass from Kirk Cousins (Matt Gay kick), 9:59. Jets 23–21. **Drive: 10 plays, 65 yards, 5:01.**
- NYJ – Braelon Allen 21-yard run (Jason Sanders kick), 8:20. Jets 30–21. **Drive: 3 plays, 58 yards, 1:39.**
- LV – Kirk Cousins 1-yard rush (Matt Gay kick), 4:14. Jets 30–28. **Drive: 10 plays, 65 yards, 4:06.**

**Fourth quarter**

- LV – Jalen Nailor 2-yard pass from Kirk Cousins (Matt Gay kick), 11:33. Raiders 35–30. **Drive: 9 plays, 84 yards, 5:00.**
- NYJ – Jason Sanders 31-yard field goal, 4:31. Raiders 35–33. **Drive: 9 plays, 68 yards, 4:38.**
- LV – Matt Gay 53-yard field goal, 0:27. Raiders 38–33. **Drive: 9 plays, 30 yards, 4:04.**

**Top passers**

- LV – Kirk Cousins – 19/26, 247 yards, 3 TD
- NYJ – Geno Smith – 20/32, 290 yards, 2 TD, INT

**Top rushers**

- LV – Mike Washington Jr. – 25 rushes, 83 yards
- NYJ – Braelon Allen – 21 rushes, 147 yards, TD

**Top receivers**

- LV – Brock Bowers – 7 receptions, 92 yards, 2 TD
- NYJ – Adonai Mitchell – 7 receptions, 142 yards, TD

==== Week 9: at Kansas City Chiefs ====
Week 9: New York Jets at Kansas City Chiefs – Game summary

Quarter	1	2	3	4	Total
Jets	6	6	0	0	**12**
**Chiefs**	0	14	14	7	**35**

at Arrowhead Stadium, Kansas City, Missouri

- Date: November 8
- Game time: 1:00 p.m. EST/12:00 p.m. CST
- Game weather: Sunny, 57 °F (14 °C)
- Game attendance: 73,628
- Referee: Adrian Hill
- TV announcers (CBS): Jim Nantz, JJ Watt, and Tracy Wolfson
- Recap, Game Book

Game information

**First quarter**

- NYJ – Jason Sanders 23-yard field goal, 6:47. Jets 3–0. **Drive: 14 plays, 64 yards, 8:13.**
- NYJ – Jason Sanders 48-yard field goal, 4:35. Jets 6–0. **Drive: 4 plays, 4 yards, 0:59.**

**Second quarter**

- KC – Kenneth Walker III 7-yard pass from Patrick Mahomes (Harrison Butker kick), 14:56. Chiefs 7–6. **Drive: 10 plays, 82 yards, 4:39.**
- NYJ – Jason Sanders 49-yard field goal, 8:12. Jets 9–7. **Drive: 12 plays, 37 yards, 6:44.**
- KC – Kenneth Walker III 25-yard pass from Patrick Mahomes (Harrison Butker kick), 5:37. Chiefs 14–9. **Drive: 2 plays, 24 yards, 0:44.**
- NYJ – Jason Sanders 54-yard field goal, 2:16. Chiefs 14–12. **Drive: 8 plays, 31 yards, 3:21.**

**Third quarter**

- KC – Travis Kelce 1-yard run (Harrison Butker kick), 10:20. Chiefs 21–12. **Drive: 10 plays, 60 yards, 4:40.**
- KC – Kenneth Walker III 2-yard run (Harrison Butker kick), 0:11. Chiefs 28–12. **Drive: 8 plays, 82 yards, 4:03.**

**Fourth quarter**

- KC – Emmett Johnson 6-yard run (Harrison Butker kick), 3:35. Chiefs 35–12. **Drive: 8 plays, 57 yards, 2:55.**

**Top passers**

- NYJ – Geno Smith – 18/32, 165 yards
- KC – Patrick Mahomes – 23/31, 242 yards, 2 TD

**Top rushers**

- NYJ – Breece Hall – 15 rushes, 61 yards
- KC – Kenneth Walker III – 18 rushes, 102 yards, TD

**Top receivers**

- NYJ – Omar Cooper Jr. – 8 receptions, 58 yards
- KC – Travis Kelce – 4 receptions, 72 yards

This game was mentioned in the November 8, 2026 edition of Pearls Before Swine.

==== Week 10: vs. Buffalo Bills ====
Week 10: Buffalo Bills at New York Jets – Game summary

Quarter	1	2	3	4	Total
**Bills**	7	3	14	7	**31**
Jets	0	6	6	0	**12**

at MetLife Stadium, East Rutherford, New Jersey

- Date: November 15
- Game time: 1:00 p.m. EST
- Game weather: Sunny, 49 °F (9 °C)
- Game attendance: 82,953
- Referee: Ron Torbert
- TV announcers (CBS): Kevin Harlan, Trent Green and Melanie Collins
- Recap, Game Book

Game information

**First quarter**

- BUF – Josh Allen 1-yard run (Tyler Bass kick), 2:49. Bills 7–0. **Drive: 12 plays, 63 yards, 6:27.**

**Second quarter**

- NYJ – Jason Sanders 41-yard field goal, 12:20. Bills 7–3. **Drive: 12 plays, 42 yards, 5:29.**
- BUF – Tyler Bass 37-yard field goal, 6:53. Bills 10–3. **Drive: 10 plays, 59 yards, 5:27.**
- NYJ – Jason Sanders 27-yard field goal, 0:12. Bills 10–6. **Drive: 9 plays, 75 yards, 2:03.**

**Third quarter**

- NYJ – Jason Sanders 22-yard field goal, 10:02. Bills 10–9. **Drive: 10 plays, 61 yards, 4:58.**
- BUF – Josh Allen 1-yard run (Tyler Bass kick), 8:02. Bills 17–9. **Drive: 4 plays, 62 yards, 2:00.**
- NYJ – Jason Sanders 48-yard field goal, 4:21. Bills 17–12. **Drive: 7 plays, 35 yards, 3:41.**
- BUF – D. J. Moore 45-yard pass from Josh Allen (Tyler Bass kick), 3:42. Bills 24–12. **Drive: 2 plays, 66 yards, 0:39.**

**Fourth quarter**

- BUF – James Cook 74-yard run (Tyler Bass kick), 4:42. Bills 31–12. **Drive: 1 plays, 74 yards, 0:10.**

**Top passers**

- BUF – Josh Allen – 11/21, 196 yards, TD, INT
- NYJ – Geno Smith – 13/21, 148 yards

**Top rushers**

- BUF – James Cook – 18 rushes, 157 yards, TD
- NYJ – Breece Hall – 11 rushes, 41 yards

**Top receivers**

- BUF – D. J. Moore – 4 receptions, 90 yards, TD
- NYJ – Garrett Wilson – 7 receptions, 106 yards

==== Week 11: at Los Angeles Chargers ====
Week 11: New York Jets at Los Angeles Chargers – Game summary

Quarter	1	2	3	4	Total
**Jets**	3	14	3	7	**27**
Chargers	3	7	0	14	**24**

at SoFi Stadium, Inglewood, California

- Date: November 22
- Game time: 4:05 p.m. EST/1:05 p.m. PST
- Game weather: Sunny, 66 °F (19 °C) (fixed roof)
- Game attendance: 68,195
- Referee: Alex Kemp
- TV announcers (Fox): Adam Amin, Drew Brees, and Kristina Pink
- Recap, Game Book

==== Week 12: at Miami Dolphins ====
Week 12: New York Jets at Miami Dolphins – Game summary

Quarter	1	2	3	4	Total
Jets	0	0	0	0	**0**
Dolphins	0	0	0	0	**0**

at Hard Rock Stadium, Miami Gardens, Florida

- Date: November 29
- Game time: 1:00 p.m. EST
- TV announcers (CBS): Spero Dedes, Adam Archuleta and Aditi Kinkhabwala
- Preview

=== Standings ===
==== Division ====
AFC East
	W	L	T	PCT	DIV	CONF	PF	PA	STK
Buffalo Bills	9	1	0	.900	2–1	6–1	313	208	W6
New England Patriots	5	5	0	.500	3–0	5–1	221	242	L2
New York Jets	3	8	0	.273	0–3	3–5	221	278	W1
Miami Dolphins	1	9	0	.100	1–2	1–6	157	250	L4

==== Conference ====
AFC
Seed	Team	Division	W	L	T	PCT	DIV	CONF	SOS	SOV	STK
**Division leaders**
1	Buffalo Bills	East	9	1	0	.900	2–1	6–1	.424	.416	W6
2	Kansas City Chiefs	West	8	2	0	.800	3–1	6–1	.374	.300	W3
3 (Note: Jacksonville wins tie break over Cincinnati based on head-to-head victory.)	Jacksonville Jaguars	South	7	2	0	.778	2–1	6–2	.444	.408	W3
4	Cincinnati Bengals	North	7	2	0	.778	2–1	5–2	.389	.310	W5
**Wild cards**
5	Denver Broncos	West	7	2	0	.778	2–1	3–1	.591	.522	W5
6 (Note: Cleveland wins tie break over Pittsburgh based on division record.)	Cleveland Browns	North	6	4	0	.600	2–1	4–3	.410	.377	W1
7	Pittsburgh Steelers	North	6	4	0	.600	2–2	3–3	.465	.417	L2
**In the hunt**
8	New England Patriots	East	5	5	0	.500	3–0	5–1	.576	.440	L2
9 (Note: Houston wins tie break over Las Vegas based on strength of victory.)	Houston Texans	South	4	6	0	.400	3–1	4–4	.480	.308	W1
10	Las Vegas Raiders	West	4	6	0	.400	1–1	3–3	.500	.179	L2
11	Baltimore Ravens	North	4	7	0	.364	0–2	2–5	.459	.286	L6
12 (Note: NY Jets wins tie break over Indianapolis based on conference record.)	New York Jets	East	3	8	0	.273	0–3	3–5	.560	.350	W1
13	Indianapolis Colts	South	3	8	0	.273	1–3	2–6	.463	.293	L1
14 (Note: LA Chargers wins tie break over Miami and Tennessee based on strength of victory.)	Los Angeles Chargers	West	1	9	0	.100	0–3	1–6	.529	.364	L1
15 (Note: Miami wins tie break over Tennessee based on strength of schedule.)	Miami Dolphins	East	1	9	0	.100	1–2	1–6	.626	.273	L4
16	Tennessee Titans	South	1	9	0	.100	1–2	1–6	.470	.273	L4
