= 2026 Detroit Lions season =

97th season in franchise history

- Owner: Sheila Ford Hamp
- General manager: Brad Holmes
- President: Richard Haddad
- Head coach: Dan Campbell
- Offensive coordinator: Drew Petzing
- Defensive coordinator: Kelvin Sheppard
- Home stadium: Ford Field

Results
- Record: 8–2
- Division place: 1st NFC North

Uniform
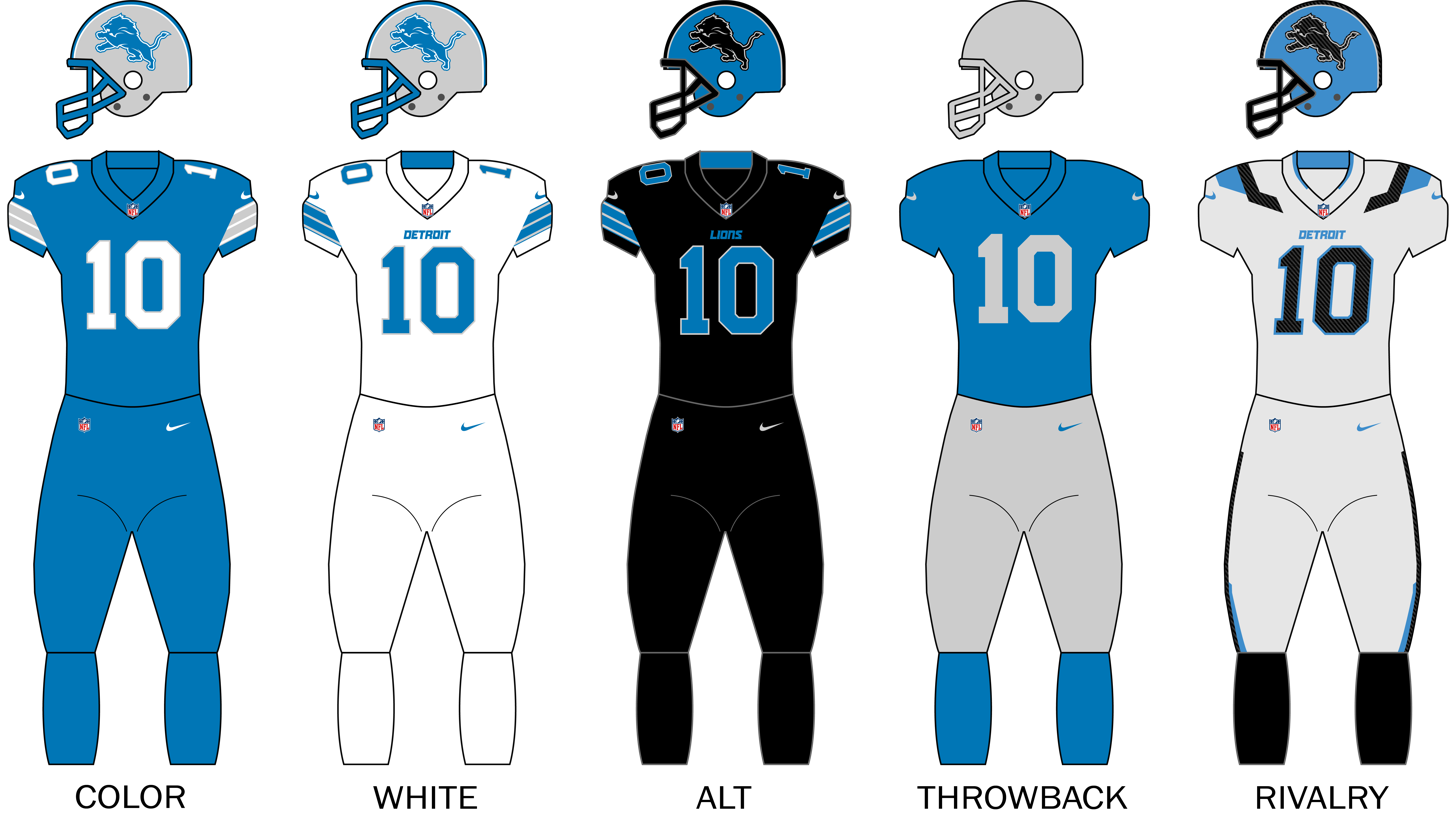

The 2026 season is the Detroit Lions' 97th in the National Football League (NFL) and their sixth under the tandem of general manager Brad Holmes and head coach Dan Campbell. The Lions are attempting to improve upon their 9–8 record from the previous season and return to the playoffs after a one-year absence.

== Player movements ==
=== Free agents ===
Position	Player	Free agency tag	Date signed	2026 team

=== Additions ===
*	= Practice squad signings

==== Pre-Season ====
Position	Player	Previous team	Date	Contract	Notes
OG	Juice Scruggs	Houston Texans	March 11		
OT	Larry Borom	Miami Dolphins	March 12	1 year, $2 million	
C	Cade Mays	Carolina Panthers	March 12	3 years, $25 million	
RB	Isiah Pacheco	Kansas City Chiefs	March 12	1 year, $1.8 million	
S	Christian Izien	Tampa Bay Buccaneers	March 13		
TE	Tyler Conklin	Los Angeles Chargers	March 13		
CB	Roger McCreary	Los Angeles Rams	March 16		
DE	D.J. Wonnum	Carolina Panthers	March 18		
LB	Damone Clark	Houston Texans	March 18	1 year, $1.402 million	
WR	Greg Dortch	Arizona Cardinals	March 18	1 year, $1.4 million	
DE	Payton Turner	New Orleans Saints	March 20	1 year, $1.145 million	
QB	Teddy Bridgewater	Tampa Bay Buccaneers	March 23		
OG	Ben Bartch	San Francisco 49ers	March 25		
S	Chuck Clark	Pittsburgh Steelers	March 31		
LB	Joe Bachie	Tennessee Titans	April 29		
DT	Jay Tufele	New York Jets	April 29		
WR	Cedrick Wilson Jr.	Miami Dolphins	May 20		
WR	Tarik Black	Louisville Kings (UFL)	June 17		
WR	Lucky Jackson	Louisville Kings (UFL)	June 17		
WR	Tay Martin	Columbus Aviators (UFL)	June 17		
WR	Lawrence Keys	Houston Gamblers (UFL)	June 18		
LB	Troy Reeder	Los Angeles Rams	July 27		
TE	Anthony Firkser	Washington Commanders	July 31		
LB	Devin White	Las Vegas Raiders	August 1		
CB	Bump Cooper Jr.	Birmingham Stallions (UFL)	August 9		
LB	Amen Ogbongbemiga	Chicago Bears	August 9		
QB	Joshua Dobbs	New England Patriots	August 9	1 year, $1.425 million	
RB	Trayveon Williams	Cleveland Browns	August 16		
S	Jason Taylor II	Orlando Storm (UFL)	August 24		
RB	Roydell Williams	Indianapolis Colts	August 24		
OC	Gus Hartwig	New York Jets	August 25		
CB	Eric Scott Jr.	Kansas City Chiefs	August 27		

==== Regular Season ====
Position	Player	Previous team	Date	Contract	Notes
OG	Elijah Klein	Tampa Bay Buccaneers	August 31		
CB	Natrone Brooks	Atlanta Falcons	September 10		
S	Bishop Fitzgerald	Pittsburgh Steelers	September 22		
NT	Jeffrey M'Ba	Washington Commanders	October 8		
WR	DeAndre Carter	Cleveland Browns	October 15		
S	Myles Bryant	Cleveland Browns	October 22		
NT	Taki Taimani	Minnesota Vikings	October 27		
LB	K. J. Britt	New England Patriots	November 2		
LB	Owen Pappoe	Tennessee Titans	November 4		
S	Andre Cisco	New York Jets	November 9		
DE	Tyrus Wheat	Dallas Cowboys	November 16		

=== Releases ===
==== Pre-Season ====
Position	Player	2026 team	Release date	Source
C	Graham Glasgow		March 2	
OT	Taylor Decker		March 9	
DE	Josh Paschal		March 11	
WR	Kyre Duplessis	Seattle Seahawks; Denver Broncos	June 18	
CB	Terrion Arnold	Seattle Seahawks	June 29	
DT	Jay Tufele		July 28	
TE	Zach Horton	Detroit Lions	July 31	
WR	Tarik Black	Detroit Lions	August 3	
WR	Lawrence Keys	Detroit Lions	August 4	
CB	De'Shawn Rucker		August 7	
TE	Nick Muse	Atlanta Falcons	August 9	
TE	Miles Kitselman	Detroit Lions	August 10	
TE	Anthony Firkser		August 10	
RB	Kye Robichaux		August 16	
S	Loren Strickland		August 16	
DE	Aidan Keanaaina	Detroit Lions	August 18	
WR	Cedrick Wilson Jr.		August 26	
RB	Raheem Blackshear		August 26	
OC	Michael Niese		August 30	
QB	Luke Altmyer	Detroit Lions	August 30	
WR	Tarik Black		August 30	
CB	Ekow Boye-Doe		August 30	
CB	Aamaris Brown	Detroit Lions	August 30	
RT	Devin Cochran	Detroit Lions	August 30	
CB	Bump Cooper Jr.		August 30	
WR	Malik Cunningham	DC Defenders (UFL)	August 30	
TE	Thomas Gordon	Detroit Lions	August 30	
OC	Gus Hartwig	Atlanta Falcons	August 30	
TE	Zach Horton		August 30	
OLB	Erick Hunter	New England Patriots	August 30	
S	Dan Jackson	Louisville Kings (UFL)	August 30	
WR	Lucky Jackson	Detroit Lions	August 30	
WR	Dominic Lovett	Detroit Lions	August 30	
DE	Anthony Lucas	Detroit Lions	August 30	
OG	Mason Miller	Detroit Lions	August 30	
OG	Melvin Priestly		August 30	
CB	Eric Scott Jr.		August 30	
DT	Chris Smith	Detroit Lions	August 30	
RT	Colby Sorsdal	Atlanta Falcons; New Orleans Saints	August 30	
S	Jason Taylor II		August 30	
DE	Tyre West	Detroit Lions	August 30	
CB	Nick Whiteside	Detroit Lions	August 30	
RB	Roydell Williams	Colorado Stampede (UFL)	August 30	
DT	Myles Adams	Los Angeles Chargers	August 30	
OLB	Joe Bachie	Detroit Lions	August 30	
TE	Tyler Conklin	Detroit Lions	August 30	
WR	Greg Dortch	Buffalo Bills	August 30	
WR	Tom Kennedy	Detroit Lions	August 30	
ILB	Amen Ogbongbemiga	Detroit Lions	August 30	
ILB	Troy Reeder	New York Jets	August 30	
OLB	Ben Stille	Detroit Lions	August 30	
RB	Trayveon Williams		August 30	

==== Regular Season ====
Position	Player	2026 team	Release date	Source
C	Seth McLaughlin	Detroit Lions	September 2	
RB	Jabari Small	Detroit Lions	September 2	
DT	Levi Onwuzurike	Detroit Lions	September 11	
DT	Tyre West		September 11	
LB	Joe Bachie	Detroit Lions	September 22	
CB	Natrone Brooks	Minnesota Vikings; Indianapolis Colts	September 28	
LB	Jalen Mills		October 13	
DT	Chris Smith	Miami Dolphins	October 20	
WR	Lawrence Keys		October 27	
S	Bishop Fitzgerald	Tennessee Titans	November 3	
TE	Jackson Meeks	Detroit Lions	November 9	
CB	Nick Whiteside	Detroit Lions	November 9	
DT	Ben Stille		November 17	

=== Players traded ===
Position	Player	New Team	Trade date	Source
RB	David Montgomery	Houston Texans	March 11	

=== Retirements ===
Position	Player	Date retired	Source
OT	Dan Skipper	January 22, 2026	
QB	Teddy Bridgewater	August 9, 2026	
OT	Jamarco Jones	August 12, 2026	
CB	Arthur Maulet	November 4, 2026	

=== Draft ===
2026 Detroit Lions draft selections
Round	Selection	Player	Position	College	Notes
1	17	Blake Miller	OT	Clemson	
2	44	Derrick Moore	EDGE	Michigan	From Cowboys via Jets (Note: The Lions traded a second-round selection (50th overall) and a fourth-round selection (128th overall) to the New York Jets in exchange for a second-round selection (44th overall).)
2	50	Traded to the New York Jets			
3	81	Traded to the Jacksonville Jaguars (Note: The Lions traded two third-round selections (81st and 100th overall) and a 2025 third-round selection to the Jacksonville Jaguars in exchange for a sixth-round selection (213th overall), and 2025 third- and sixth-round selections.)			
3	100	Traded to the Jacksonville Jaguars			2020 Resolution JC-2A selection (Note: The Lions received Resolution JC-2A third-round selections in the 2025 and 2026 drafts as the result of former defensive coordinator Aaron Glenn being hired as the New York Jets' head coach in the 2025 off-season.)
4	118	Jimmy Rolder	LB	Michigan	
4	128	Traded to the New York Jets			From Texans (Note: The Lions traded RB David Montgomery to the Houston Texans for a fourth-round selection (128th overall), a 2027 seventh-round selection and C Juice Scruggs.)
5	157	Keith Abney II	CB	Arizona State	
5	168	Kendrick Law	WR	Kentucky	Compensatory selection
5	181	Traded to the Buffalo Bills (Note: The Lions traded a fifth-round selection (181st overall) and a sixth-round selection (213th overall) to the Buffalo Bills in exchange for a fifth-round pick (168th overall).)			
6	199	Traded to the Cleveland Browns (Note: The Lions traded a sixth-round selection and a 2025 fifth-round selection to the Cleveland Browns in exchange for a seventh-round pick (222nd overall) and EDGE Za'Darius Smith.)			
6	205	Skyler Gill-Howard	DT	Texas A&M	From Jaguars (Note: The Lions traded WR Tim Patrick to the Jacksonville Jaguars in exchange for a sixth-round selection (205th overall).)
6	213	Traded to the Buffalo Bills			From Seahawks via Jaguars
7	222	Tyre West	DL	Tennessee	From Browns
7	233	Traded to the Jacksonville Jaguars (Note: The Lions traded a conditional seventh-round selection (233rd overall) to the Jacksonville Jaguars in exchange for K Riley Patterson.)			

Draft trades

2026 Detroit Lions undrafted free agents
Name	Position	College	Ref.
Luke Altmyer	QB	Illinois	
Aamaris Brown	DB	UNLV	
Kyre Duplessis	WR	Delaware	
Erick Hunter	LB	Morgan State	
Aidan Keanaaina	DL	California	
Miles Kitselman	TE	Tennessee	
Anthony Lucas	DE	USC	
Eric O'Neill	DE	Rutgers	
Melvin Priestly	OL	Illinois	
De'Shawn Rucker	CB	South Florida	

== Staff ==
Detroit Lions staff
Front office: Owner – Sheila Ford Hamp; Vice chairpeople – William Clay Ford Jr., Martha Ford Morse, Elizabeth Ford Kontulis; President/CEO – Rod Wood; Executive vice president & general manager – Brad Holmes; Chief operating officer – Mike Disner; Special assistant/chairperson – Chris Spielman; Assistant general manager – Ray Agnew; Vice president of player personnel – Dwayne Joseph; Vice president, roster operations/evaluations – Rob Lohman; Director of college scouting – Brian Hudspeth; Assistant director of college scouting – Mark Olson; Director of pro scouting – Joe Kelleher; Senior personnel executive – John Dorsey; Personnel advisor – Chris Grier; Senior director of football administration – Charlie Adkins; Director, football information – Caio Brighenti; Manager, decision science & football information – Paul Ibrahim; Head coaches: Head coach – Dan Campbell; Associate head coach/wide receivers – Scottie Montgomery; Assistant head coach/safeties – Jim O'Neil; Offensive coaches: Offensive coordinator – Drew Petzing; Passing game coordinator – Mike Kafka; Quarterbacks – Mark Brunell; Running backs – Tashard Choice; Assistant wide receivers – Bruce Gradkowski; Tight ends – Steve Oliver; Run game coordinator/offensive line – Hank Fraley; Pass game specialist – David Shaw; Offensive assistant – Dan Skipper; Offensive assistant – Marques Tuiasosopo; Offensive quality control – Justin Mesa	Defensive coaches: Defensive coordinator – Kelvin Sheppard; Run game coordinator/defensive line – Kacy Rodgers; Linebackers – Shaun Dion Hamilton; Passing game coordinator/defensive backs – Deshea Townsend; Senior defensive assistant/outside linebackers – David Corrao; Defensive assistant – Caleb Collins; Defensive assistant – August Mangin; Defensive quality control – Dré Thompson; Special teams coaches: Special teams coordinator – Dave Fipp; Assistant special teams – Jett Modkins; Strength and conditioning: Director of sports performance – Mike Clark; Director of sports science – Jill Costanza; Head strength & conditioning – Josh Schuler; Assistant strength & conditioning – Thaddeus Jackson; Assistant strength & conditioning – Cameron Josse; → Coaching staff → Front office → More NFL staffs

== Current roster ==
Detroit Lions roster
Quarterbacks (QB): 11 Joshua Dobbs; 16 Jared Goff; Running backs (RB): 0 Jahmyr Gibbs; 25 Jacob Saylors KR; 33 Sione Vaki; Wide receivers (WR): 86 DeAndre Carter RS; 17 Tay Martin; 14 Amon-Ra St. Brown; 18 Isaac TeSlaa; 1 Jameson Williams; Tight ends (TE): 83 Tyler Conklin; 87 Sam LaPorta; 89 Brock Wright FB	Offensive linemen (OL): 79 Larry Borom T; 71 Miles Frazier G; 73 Christian Mahogany G; 65 Seth McLaughlin C; 76 Blake Miller T; 69 Tate Ratledge G; 70 Juice Scruggs C; 58 Penei Sewell T; Defensive linemen (DL): 50 Skyler Gill-Howard DT; 99 Ahmed Hassanein ED; 93 Tyler Lacy ED; 54 Alim McNeill DT; 8 Derrick Moore ED; 66 Eric O'Neill ED; 95 Levi Onwuzurike DT; 91 Tyleik Williams DT; 94 Mekhi Wingo DT; 98 D. J. Wonnum ED	Linebackers (LB): 35 Joe Bachie; 55 Derrick Barnes; 40 K. J. Britt; 53 Trevor Nowaske; 57 Amen Ogbongbemiga; 44 Malcolm Rodriguez; 90 Tyrus Wheat; Defensive backs (DB): 6 Keith Abney II CB/S; 32 Brian Branch SS; 28 Andre Cisco FS; 36 Chuck Clark S; 30 Khalil Dorsey CB; 5 Christian Izien S; 31 Kerby Joseph FS; 21 Roger McCreary CB; 2 Ennis Rakestraw Jr. CB; 4 D. J. Reed CB; 38 Nick Whiteside CB; 23 Rock Ya-Sin CB; Special teams (ST): 39 Jake Bates K; 3 Jack Fox P; 49 Hogan Hatten LS	Practice squad: 15 Luke Altmyer QB; 24 Aamaris Brown CB; 27 Myles Bryant S; 77 Devin Cochran T; 82 Thomas Gordon TE; 9 Lucky Jackson WR; 72 Aidan Keanaaina DT; 84 Miles Kitselman TE; 67 Elijah Klein G; 19 Dominic Lovett WR; 61 Anthony Lucas ED; 60 Jeffrey M'Ba DT (IPP); 13 Jackson Meeks TE; 51 Owen Pappoe LB; 26 Jabari Small RB; 74 Taki Taimani DT; Reserve: 78 Ben Bartch G (IR); 46 Jack Campbell LB (IR); 11 Damone Clark MLB (IR); 12 Thomas Harper S (IR); 97 Aidan Hutchinson ED (IR); 85 Tom Kennedy WR (IR); 88 Kendrick Law WR (IR); 29 Avonte Maddox S (IR); 59 Giovanni Manu T (NF-Inj.); 64 Cade Mays C (IR); 63 Mason Miller G (PS/I); 10 Isiah Pacheco RB (IR); 41 Jimmy Rolder LB (IR); 92 Payton Turner ED (IR); 45 Devin White LB (IR) 53 active, 15 practice squad (1 IPP), 15 reserve As of November 21, 2026. Rookies in italics.; Roster; Depth chart; Transactions

== Preseason ==
The Lions' preseason opponents and schedule was announced on May 14—in conjunction with the release of the regular season schedule.

Week	Date	Opponent	Result	Record	Venue	Recap
1	August 13	at Cincinnati Bengals	L 14–16	0–1	Paycor Stadium	Recap
2	August 22	Washington Commanders	W 17–13	1–1	Ford Field	Recap
3	August 29	at Indianapolis Colts	W 25–16	2–1	Lucas Oil Stadium	Recap

== Regular season ==
=== Schedule ===
Week	Date	Time (ET)	Opponent	Result	Record	Venue	TV	Recap
1	September 13	1:00 p.m.	New Orleans Saints	**W** 31–30 (OT)	1–0	Ford Field	Fox	Recap
2	September 17	8:15 p.m.	at Buffalo Bills	**L** 31–41	1–1	Highmark Stadium	Prime Video	Recap
3	September 27	1:00 p.m.	New York Jets	**W** 31–24	2–1	Ford Field	Fox	Recap
4	October 4	8:20 p.m.	at Carolina Panthers	**L** 26–32	2–2	Bank of America Stadium	NBC	Recap
5	October 11	4:25 p.m.	at Arizona Cardinals	**W** 45–21	3–2	State Farm Stadium	Fox	Recap
6	Bye							
7	October 25	4:25 p.m.	**Green Bay Packers**	**W** 20–17	4–2	Ford Field	Fox	Recap
8	November 1	1:00 p.m.	**Minnesota Vikings**	**W** 19–15	5–2	Ford Field	Fox	Recap
9	November 8	1:00 p.m.	at Miami Dolphins	**W** 19–9	6–2	Hard Rock Stadium	CBS	Recap
10	November 15	9:30 a.m.	New England Patriots	**W** 35–10	7–2	(Germany) Allianz Arena (Munich)	Fox	Recap
11	November 22	1:00 p.m.	Tampa Bay Buccaneers	**W** 31–21	8–2	Ford Field	Fox	Recap
12	November 26	1:00 p.m.	**Chicago Bears**			Ford Field	CBS	
13	December 6	1:00 p.m.	at Atlanta Falcons			Mercedes-Benz Stadium	CBS	
14	December 13	1:00 p.m.	Tennessee Titans			Ford Field	Fox	
15	December 20	8:20 p.m.	at **Minnesota Vikings**			U.S. Bank Stadium	NBC	
16	December 28	8:15 p.m.	New York Giants			Ford Field	ESPN	
17	January 3	4:25 p.m.	at **Chicago Bears**			Soldier Field	Fox	
18	January 9/10	TBD	at **Green Bay Packers**			Lambeau Field	TBD	

Notes

- Intra-division opponents are in **bold** text.
- Networks, dates and times from Weeks 13–17 are subject to change as a result of flexible scheduling.
- The date, time and network for Week 18 will be finalized at the end of Week 17.

=== Game summaries ===
==== Week 1: vs. New Orleans Saints ====
Week 1: New Orleans Saints at Detroit Lions – Game summary

Quarter	1	2	3	4	OT	Total
Saints	0	0	14	10	6	**30**
**Lions**	7	0	14	3	7	**31**

at Ford Field, Detroit, Michigan

- Date: September 13
- Game time: 1:00 p.m. EDT
- Game weather: None (indoor stadium)
- Game attendance: 62,897
- Referee: Alan Eck
- TV announcers (Fox): Kenny Albert, Jonathan Vilma and Megan Olivi
- Recap, Game Book

Game information

**First quarter**

- DET – Jahmyr Gibbs 1-yard run (Jake Bates kick), 3:39. Lions 7–0. **Drive: 13 plays, 89 yards, 6:25.**

**Second quarter**

- No scoring plays

**Third quarter**

- DET – Jahmyr Gibbs 1-yard run (Jake Bates kick), 11:14. Lions 14–0. **Drive: 7 plays, 41 yards, 3:37.**
- DET – Amon-Ra St. Brown 19-yard pass from Jared Goff (Jake Bates kick), 8:54. Lions 21–0. **Drive: 3 plays, 25 yards, 0:51.**
- NO – Kendre Miller 8-yard run (Daniel Carlson kick), 4:27. Lions 21–7. **Drive: 9 plays, 79 yards, 4:27.**
- NO – Devaughn Vele 1-yard pass from Tyler Shough (Daniel Carlson kick), 0:28. Lions 21–14. **Drive: 7 plays, 54 yards, 2:52.**

**Fourth quarter**

- NO – Daniel Carlson 28-yard field goal, 7:41. Lions 21–17. **Drive: 11 plays, 66 yards, 5:22.**
- DET – Jake Bates 23-yard field goal, 2:32. Lions 24–17. **Drive: 8 plays, 45 yards, 5:09.**
- NO – Juwan Johnson 9-yard pass from Tyler Shough (Daniel Carlson kick), 1:07. Tied 24–24. **Drive: 8 plays, 75 yards, 1:25.**

**Overtime**

- DET – Amon-Ra St. Brown 4-yard pass from Jared Goff (Jake Bates kick), 5:04. Lions 31–24. **Drive: 10 plays, 70 yards, 4:56.**
- NO – Noah Fant 8-yard pass from Tyler Shough (pass failed), 1:34. Lions 31–30. **Drive: 10 plays, 80 yards, 3:30.**

**Top passers**

- NO – Tyler Shough – 35/56, 410 yards, 3 TD, 2 INT
- DET – Jared Goff – 26/39, 206 yards, 2 TD

**Top rushers**

- NO – Travis Etienne – 9 rushes, 46 yards
- DET – Jahmyr Gibbs – 29 rushes, 156 yards, 2 TD

**Top receivers**

- NO – Chris Olave – 10 receptions, 182 yards
- DET – Amon-Ra St. Brown – 10 receptions, 67 yards, 2 TD

In their season opener, the Lions hosted the New Orleans Saints. The Lions opened the scoring in the first quarter via a one-yard touchdown run from Jahmyr Gibbs. After a scoreless second quarter, Detroit led 7–0 at half-time. The Lions scored 14 points in the third quarter via a one-yard touchdown run from Gibbs and a 19-yard touchdown pass from Jared Goff to Amon-Ra St. Brown. The Saints responded with 14 points in the quarter via an eight-yard touchdown run from Kendre Miller and a one-yard touchdown pass from Tyler Shough to Devaughn Vele. The teams exchanged field goals in the fourth quarter, first a 28-yard field goal by Daniel Carlson for New Orleans then a 23-yard field goal by Jake Bates for Detroit. The Saints scored the final points of the quarter via a nine-yard touchdown pass rom Shough to Juwan Johnson to tie the game and force overtime. During overtime, the Lions scored via a four-yard touchdown pass from Goff to St. Brown. The Saints responded with an eight-yard touchdown pass from Shough to Noah Fant, and failed their two-point conversion attempt, making the final score 31–30 in favor of Detroit.

==== Week 2: at Buffalo Bills ====
Week 2: Detroit Lions at Buffalo Bills – Game summary

Quarter	1	2	3	4	Total
Lions	0	10	7	14	**31**
**Bills**	14	13	7	7	**41**

at Highmark Stadium, Orchard Park, New York

- Date: September 17
- Game time: 8:15 p.m. EDT
- Game weather: Cloudy, 67 °F (19 °C)
- Game attendance: 60,644
- Referee: Ron Torbert
- TV announcers (WJBK/Prime Video): Al Michaels, Kirk Herbstreit and Kaylee Hartung
- Recap, Game Book

Game information

**First quarter**

- BUF – Josh Allen 1-yard run (Tyler Bass kick), 9:09. Bills 7–0. **Drive: 10 plays, 85 yards, 5:51.**
- BUF – Josh Palmer 43-yard pass from Josh Allen (Tyler Bass kick), 3:42. Bills 14–0. **Drive: 8 plays, 79 yards, 3:27.**

**Second quarter**

- BUF – Dawson Knox 1-yard pass from Josh Allen (Tyler Bass kick), 11:48. Bills 21–0. **Drive: 9 plays, 57 yards, 4:09.**
- DET – Jahmyr Gibbs 11-yard pass from Jared Goff (Jake Bates kick), 5:03. Bills 21–7. **Drive: 12 plays, 70 yards, 6:45.**
- BUF – Dalton Kincaid 16-yard pass from Josh Allen (kick failed), 2:52. Bills 27–7. **Drive: 4 plays, 68 yards, 2:11.**
- DET – Jake Bates 31-yard field goal, 0:00. Bills 27–10. **Drive: 8 plays, 65 yards, 0:39.**

**Third quarter**

- DET – Amon-Ra St. Brown 2-yard pass from Jared Goff (Jake Bates kick), 9:29. Bills 27–17. **Drive: 11 plays, 74 yards, 5:31.**
- BUF – Josh Allen 2-yard run (Tyler Bass kick), 1:07. Bills 34–17. **Drive: 15 plays, 75 yards, 8:22.**

**Fourth quarter**

- DET – Sam LaPorta 1-yard pass from Jared Goff (Jake Bates kick), 10:53. Bills 34–24. **Drive: 11 plays, 66 yards, 5:14.**
- BUF – James Cook 1-yard run (Tyler Bass kick), 2:50. Bills 41–24. **Drive: 8 plays, 61 yards, 4:38.**
- DET – Amon-Ra St. Brown 27-yard pass from Jared Goff (Jake Bates kick), 1:42. Bills 41–31. **Drive: 7 plays, 68 yards, 1:08.**

**Top passers**

- DET – Jared Goff – 26/38, 327 yards, 4 TD
- BUF – Josh Allen – 20/31, 248 yards, 3 TD

**Top rushers**

- DET – Jahmyr Gibbs – 16 rushes, 52 yards
- BUF – James Cook – 21 rushes, 135 yards, TD

**Top receivers**

- BUF – Dalton Kincaid – 7 receptions, 95 yards, TD
- DET – Amon-Ra St. Brown – 9 receptions, 142 yards, 2 TD

In week 2, the Lions visited the Buffalo Bills. The Bills scored 14 points in the first quarter via a one-yard touchdown run from Josh Allen and a 43-yard touchdown pass from Allen to Josh Palmer. The Bills extended their lead in the second quarter via a one-yard touchdown pass from Allen to Dawson Knox. The Lions finally got on the board via an 11-yard touchdown pass from Jared Goff to Jahmyr Gibbs. The Bills responded with a 16-yard touchdown pass from Allen to Dalton Kincaid. The Lions scored the final points of the half via a 31-yard field goal by Jake Bates, which made the score 27–10 in favor of Buffalo at half-time. The teams exchanged touchdowns in the third quarter, first a two-yard touchdown pass from Goff to Amon-Ra St. Brown for the Lions, then a two-yard touchdown run from Allen for the Bills. The Lions opened the scoring in the fourth quarter via a one-yard touchdown pass from Goff to Sam LaPorta. The Bills responded with a one-yard touchdown run from James Cook. The Lions scored the final points of the game via a 27-yard touchdown pass from Goff to St. Brown, making the final score 41–31 in favor of Buffalo. This was Detroit's seventh loss to Buffalo since 2006.

==== Week 3: vs. New York Jets ====
Week 3: New York Jets at Detroit Lions – Game summary

Quarter	1	2	3	4	Total
Jets	0	7	3	14	**24**
**Lions**	0	10	7	14	**31**

at Ford Field, Detroit, Michigan

- Date: September 27
- Game time: 1:00 p.m. EDT
- Game weather: None (indoor stadium)
- Game attendance: 63,193
- Referee: Brad Rogers
- TV announcers (Fox): Adam Amin, Drew Brees and Kristina Pink
- Recap, Game Book

Game information

**First quarter**

- No scoring plays

**Second quarter**

- DET – Jake Bates 30-yard field goal, 9:35. Lions 3–0. **Drive: 9 plays, 49 yards, 5:16.**
- NYJ – Kenyon Sadiq 24-yard pass from Geno Smith (Jason Sanders kick), 5:33. Jets 7–3. **Drive: 7 plays, 74 yards, 4:02.**
- DET – Amon-Ra St. Brown 4-yard pass from Jared Goff (Jake Bates kick), 1:36. Lions 10–7. **Drive: 12 plays, 53 yards, 3:57.**

**Third quarter**

- DET – Jahmyr Gibbs 17-yard run (Jake Bates kick), 10:56. Lions 17–7. **Drive: 7 plays, 80 yards, 4:04.**
- NYJ – Jason Sanders 42-yard field goal, 6:22. Lions 17–10. **Drive: 8 plays, 44 yards, 4:34.**

**Fourth quarter**

- DET – Jahmyr Gibbs 1-yard run (Jake Bates kick), 14:57. Lions 24–10. **Drive: 11 plays, 62 yards, 6:25.**
- NYJ – Jeremy Ruckert 4-yard pass from Geno Smith (pass failed), 11:17. Lions 24–16. **Drive: 9 plays, 80 yards, 3:40.**
- NYJ – Garrett Wilson 23-yard pass from Geno Smith (Geno Smith–Sterling Shepard pass), 4:06. Tied 24–24. **Drive: 8 plays, 54 yards, 4:26.**
- DET – Jahmyr Gibbs 11-yard pass from Jared Goff (Jake Bates kick), 2:25. Lions 31–24. **Drive: 4 plays, 65 yards, 1:41.**

**Top passers**

- NYJ – Geno Smith – 31/37, 321 yards, 3 TD
- DET – Jared Goff – 25/32, 269 yards, 2 TD

**Top rushers**

- NYJ – Breece Hall – 13 rushes, 32 yards
- DET – Jahmyr Gibbs – 20 rushes, 99 yards, 2 TD

**Top receivers**

- NYJ – Garrett Wilson – 10 receptions, 107 yards, TD
- DET – Isaac TeSlaa – 3 receptions, 66 yards

Detroit on offense against the New York Jets

In week 3, the Lions hosted the New York Jets, in what was the Jets' head coach Aaron Glenn’s return to Detroit after previously serving as the Lions' defensive coordinator. After a scoreless first quarter, the Lions opened the scoring in the second quarter via a 30-yard field goal by Jake Bates. The Jets responded with a 24-yard touchdown pass from Geno Smith to Kenyon Sadiq to take their first lead of the game. The Lions scored the final points of the half via a four-yard touchdown pass from Jared Goff to Amon-Ra St. Brown, which made the score 10–7 in favor of Detroit at half-time. The Lions extended their lead in the third quarter via a 17-yard touchdown run from Jahmyr Gibbs. The Jets responded with a 42-yard field goal by Jason Sanders. The Lions extended their lead in the fourth quarter via a one-yard touchdown run from Gibbs. The Jets responded with 14 unanswered points to tie the game--a four-yard touchdown pass from Smith to Jeremy Ruckert, followed by a 23-yard touchdown pass Garrett Wilson with a two-point conversion pass from Smith to Sterling Shepard to tie the game. The Lions scored the final points of the game via an 11-yard touchdown pass from Jared Goff to Gibbs, making the final score 31–24 in favor of Detroit.

With their first home against the Jets since 1997, the Lions improved to 2–1.

==== Week 4: at Carolina Panthers ====
Week 4: Detroit Lions at Carolina Panthers – Game summary

Quarter	1	2	3	4	Total
Lions	3	13	3	7	**26**
**Panthers**	7	9	13	3	**32**

at Bank of America Stadium, Charlotte, North Carolina

- Date: October 4
- Game time: 8:20 p.m. EDT
- Game weather: Cloudy, 66 °F (19 °C)
- Game attendance: 73,436
- Referee: Clay Martin
- TV announcers (NBC): Mike Tirico, Cris Collinsworth and Melissa Stark
- Recap, Game Book

Game information

**First quarter**

- DET – Jake Bates 54-yard field goal, 12:05. Lions 3–0. **Drive: 7 plays, 29 yards, 2:55.**
- CAR – Chuba Hubbard 15-yard run (Ryan Fitzgerald kick), 1:50. Panthers 7–3. **Drive: 8 plays, 72 yards, 4:00.**

**Second quarter**

- DET – Jake Bates 43-yard field goal, 12:37. Panthers 7–6. **Drive: 10 plays, 48 yards, 4:13.**
- CAR – Tetairoa McMillan 32-yard pass from Bryce Young (kick failed, hit right upright), 8:08. Panthers 13–6. **Drive: 9 plays, 75 yards, 4:29.**
- DET – Jahmyr Gibbs 1-yard run (Jake Bates kick), 2:14. Tied 13–13. **Drive: 11 plays, 68 yards, 5:54.**
- CAR – Ryan Fitzgerald 47-yard field goal, 0:28. Panthers 16–13. **Drive: 9 plays, 41 yards, 1:46.**
- DET – Jake Bates 41-yard field goal, 0:00. Tied 16–16. **Drive: 4 plays, 49 yards, 0:28.**

**Third quarter**

- CAR – Tetairoa McMillan 10-yard pass from Bryce Young (kick failed, wide right), 9:33. Panthers 22–16. **Drive: 11 plays, 76 yards, 5:27.**
- DET – Jake Bates 26-yard field goal, 6:21. Panthers 22–19. **Drive: 7 plays, 57 yards, 3:12.**
- CAR – Chuba Hubbard 2-yard run (Ryan Fitzgerald kick), 2:47. Panthers 29–19. **Drive: 7 plays, 85 yards, 3:34.**

**Fourth quarter**

- CAR – Ryan Fitzgerald 33-yard field goal, 8:59. Panthers 32–19. **Drive: 13 plays, 72 yards, 5:44.**
- DET – Sam LaPorta 8-yard pass from Jared Goff (Jake Bates kick), 3:38. Lions 31–24. **Drive: 10 plays, 67 yards, 2:29.**

**Top passers**

- DET – Jared Goff – 32/52, 412 yards, TD
- CAR – Bryce Young – 29/41, 329 yards, 2 TD

**Top rushers**

- DET – Jahmyr Gibbs – 15 rushes, 46 yards, TD
- CAR – Chuba Hubbard – 20 rushes, 122 yards, 2 TD

**Top receivers**

- DET – Sam LaPorta – 8 receptions, 84 yards, TD
- CAR – Tetairoa McMillan – 14 receptions, 192 yards, 2 TD

In week 4, the Lions visited the Carolina Panthers. The Lions opened the scoring in the first quarter via a 54-yard field goal by Jake Bates. The Panthers responded with a 15-yard touchdown run from Chuba Hubbard to take their first lead of the game. The Lions scored another field goal in the second quarter, reducing the Panthers' lead to one point. The Panthers extended their lead via a 32-yard touchdown pass from Bryce Young to Tetairoa McMillan, and a failed point after touchdown. The Lions responded with a one-yard touchdown run from Jahmyr Gibbs to tie the game. The Panthers regained the lead via a 47-yard field goal by Ryan Fitzgerald with 28 seconds remaining in the half. The Lions scored the final points of the half via a 41-yard field goal by Bates as time expired, tying the score at 16–16 at half-time. The Panthers regained the lead in the third quarter via a ten-yard touchdown pass from Young to McMillan, and another failed point after touchdown. The Lions responded with a 26-yard field goal by Bates, reducing the Panthers' lead to three points. The Panthers responded with a two-yard touchdown run from Hubbard. The Panthers extended their lead in the fourth quarter via a 33-yard field goal by Fitzgerald. The Lions responded with an eight-yard touchdown pass from Jared Goff to Sam LaPorta. The Lions' attempted comeback failed after turning the ball over on downs with under two minutes remaining in the game, making the final score 32–26 in favor of Carolina.

==== Week 5: at Arizona Cardinals ====
Week 5: Detroit Lions at Arizona Cardinals – Game summary

Quarter	1	2	3	4	Total
**Lions**	0	24	14	7	**45**
Cardinals	7	0	7	7	**21**

at State Farm Stadium, Glendale, Arizona

- Date: October 11
- Game time: 4:25 p.m. EDT/1:25 p.m. MST
- Game weather: None (retractable roof closed)
- Game attendance: 60,968
- Referee: Carl Cheffers
- TV announcers (Fox): Kevin Kugler, Daryl Johnston and Allison Williams
- Recap, Game Book

Game information

**First quarter**

- ARI – Teagan Quitoriano 2-yard pass from Jacoby Brissett (Chad Ryland kick), 5:06. Cardinals 7–0. **Drive: 14 plays, 73 yards, 7:54.**

**Second quarter**

- DET – Jahmyr Gibbs 1-yard run (Jake Bates kick), 12:22. Tied 7–7. **Drive: 7 plays, 54 yards, 1:56.**
- DET – Sam LaPorta 38-yard pass from Jared Goff (Jake Bates kick), 9:30. Lions 14–7. **Drive: 4 plays, 47 yards, 1:21.**
- DET – Jameson Williams 8-yard pass from Jared Goff (Jake Bates kick), 4:50. Lions 21–7. **Drive: 9 plays, 75 yards, 3:39.**
- DET – Jake Bates 46-yard field goal, 0:53. Lions 24–7. **Drive: 8 plays, 35 yards, 2:10.**

**Third quarter**

- DET – Jameson Williams 39-yard pass from Jared Goff (Jake Bates kick), 9:42. Lions 31–7. **Drive: 5 plays, 57 yards, 2:37.**
- ARI – Teagan Quitoriano 13-yard pass from Jacoby Brissett (Chad Ryland kick), 4:22. Lions 31–14. **Drive: 10 plays, 72 yards, 5:20.**
- DET – Jared Goff 1-yard run (Jake Bates kick), 1:05. Lions 38–14. **Drive: 8 plays, 74 yards, 3:17.**

**Fourth quarter**

- DET – Jahmyr Gibbs 3-yard run (Jake Bates kick), 5:03. Lions 45–14. **Drive: 13 plays, 79 yards, 7:52.**
- ARI – Trey McBride 9-yard pass from Jacoby Brissett (Chad Ryland kick), 2:11. Lions 45–21. **Drive: 13 plays, 78 yards, 2:52.**

**Top passers**

- DET – Jared Goff – 19/30, 271 yards, 3 TD
- ARI – Jacoby Brissett – 29/47, 292 yards, 3 TD, INT

**Top rushers**

- DET – Jahmyr Gibbs – 25 rushes, 151 yards, 2 TD
- ARI – Jeremiyah Love – 12 rushes, 22 yards

**Top receivers**

- DET – Sam LaPorta – 5 receptions, 88 yards, TD
- ARI – Kendrick Bourne – 5 receptions, 70 yards

In week 5, the Lions visited the Arizona Cardinals. The Cardinals opened the scoring in the first quarter via a two-yard touchdown pass from Jacoby Brissett to Teagan Quitoriano. After not scoring in the first quarter, the Lions scored 24 unanswered points in the second: a one-yard run from Jahmyr Gibbs, a 38-yard pass from Jared Goff to Sam LaPorta on fourth down, an eight-yard pass to Jameson Williams, also on fourth down, and a 46-yard Jake Bates field goal, making the score 24–7 in favor of Detroit at half-time. The Lions extended their lead in the third quarter via a 39-yard pass from Goff to Williams, his second touchdown reception of the day. The Cardinals responded with a 13-yard touchdown pass from Brissett to Quitoriano, their second hookup of the game. Before the third quarter ended, Goff ran in a one-yard quarterback sneak for a touchdown, the Lions' third fourth down touchdown play of the day. The Lions extended their lead in the fourth quarter via a three-yard touchdown run from Gibbs. This was the seventh consecutive drive by the Lions offense that resulted in points. Arizona scored the final points of the game via a nine-yard touchdown pass from Brissett to Trey McBride, making the final score 45–21 in favor of Detroit. The Lions entered their bye week with a 3–2 record.

==== Week 7: vs. Green Bay Packers ====
Week 7: Green Bay Packers at Detroit Lions – Game summary

Quarter	1	2	3	4	Total
Packers	7	0	7	3	**17**
**Lions**	7	3	7	3	**20**

at Ford Field, Detroit, Michigan

- Date: October 25
- Game time: 4:25 p.m. EDT
- Game weather: None (indoor stadium)
- Game attendance: 64,008
- Referee: Alex Moore
- TV announcers (Fox): Kevin Burkhardt, Tom Brady, Erin Andrews and Tom Rinaldi
- Recap, Game Book

Game information

**First quarter**

- DET – Jameson Williams 16-yard pass from Jared Goff (Jake Bates kick), 7:00. Lions 7–0. **Drive: 6 plays, 80 yards, 3:23.**
- GB – Tucker Kraft 14-yard pass from Jordan Love (Trey Smack kick), 0:58. Tied 7–7. **Drive: 12 plays, 74 yards, 6:02.**

**Second quarter**

- DET – Jake Bates 40-yard field goal, 12:36. Lions 10–7. **Drive: 6 plays, 55 yards, 3:22.**

**Third quarter**

- GB – Josh Jacobs 25-yard pass from Jordan Love (Trey Smack kick), 12:14. Packers 14–10. **Drive: 5 plays, 42 yards, 1:58.**
- DET – Jameson Williams 10-yard pass from Jared Goff (Jake Bates kick), 6:33. Lions 17–14. **Drive: 10 plays, 80 yards, 5:41.**

**Fourth quarter**

- GB – Trey Smack 43-yard field goal, 7:10. Tied 17–17. **Drive: 12 plays, 61 yards, 6:34.**
- DET – Jake Bates 22-yard field goal, 0:00. Lions 20–17. **Drive: 10 plays, 71 yards, 3:21.**

**Top passers**

- GB – Jordan Love – 27/45, 274 yards, 2 TD, INT
- DET – Jared Goff – 22/32, 303 yards, 2 TD

**Top rushers**

- GB – Josh Jacobs – 11 rushes, 36 yards
- DET – Jahmyr Gibbs – 29 rushes, 116 yards

**Top receivers**

- GB – Christian Watson – 5 receptions, 57 yards
- DET – Amon-Ra St. Brown – 9 receptions, 153 yards

Following their bye week, in week 7, the Lions hosted their divisional rival, the Green Bay Packers. The Lions opened the scoring in the first quarter via a 16-yard touchdown pass from Jared Goff to Jameson Williams. The Packers responded with a 14-yard touchdown pass from Jordan Love to Tucker Kraft to tie the game. The Lions regained the lead in the second quarter via a 40-yard field goal by Jake Bates, which made the score 10–7 in favor of Detroit at half-time. The Packers took their first lead of the game in the third quarter via a 25-yard touchdown pass from Love to Josh Jacobs. The Lions responded with a ten-yard touchdown pass from Goff to Williams to regain the lead. The Packers tied the game in the fourth quarter via a 43-yard field goal by Trey Smack. The Lions scored the final points of the game via a 22-yard field goal by Bates as time expired, making the final score 20–17 in favor of Detroit.

==== Week 8: vs. Minnesota Vikings ====
Week 8: Minnesota Vikings at Detroit Lions – Game summary

Quarter	1	2	3	4	Total
Vikings	0	7	0	8	**15**
**Lions**	3	3	6	7	**19**

at Ford Field, Detroit, Michigan

- Date: November 1
- Game time: 1:00 p.m. EST
- Game weather: None (indoor stadium)
- Game attendance: 64,008
- Referee: Craig Wrolstad
- TV announcers (Fox): Kevin Burkhardt, Tom Brady, Erin Andrews and Tom Rinaldi
- Recap, Game Book

Game information

**First quarter**

- DET – Jake Bates 25-yard field goal, 2:18. Lions 3–0. **Drive: 12 plays, 57 yards, 5:03.**

**Second quarter**

- MIN – Justin Jefferson 1-yard pass from Kyler Murray (Will Reichard kick), 14:25. Vikings 7–6. **Drive: 7 plays, 74 yards, 2:53.**
- DET – Jake Bates 37-yard field goal, 0:02. Vikings 7–6. **Drive: 7 plays, 43 yards, 1:45.**

**Third quarter**

- DET – Jahmyr Gibbs 30-yard run (run failed), 4:40. Lions 12–7. **Drive: 6 plays, 72 yards, 2:53.**

**Fourth quarter**

- MIN – T. J. Hockenson 8-yard pass from Kyler Murray (Kyler Murray–Jordan Addison pass), 8:44. Vikings 15–12. **Drive: 7 plays, 84 yards, 3:56.**
- DET – Jameson Williams 7-yard pass from Jared Goff (Jake Bates kick), 4:35. Lions 19–15. **Drive: 7 plays, 69 yards, 4:09.**

**Top passers**

- MIN – Kyler Murray – 17/29, 210 yards, 2 TD, INT
- DET – Jared Goff – 18/25, 176 yards, TD, INT

**Top rushers**

- MIN – Kyler Murray – 4 rushes, 35 yards
- DET – Jahmyr Gibbs – 23 rushes, 153 yards, TD

**Top receivers**

- MIN – Jordan Addison – 3 receptions, 66 yards
- DET – Jameson Williams – 4 receptions, 70 yards, TD

In week 8, the Lions hosted their divisional rival, the Minnesota Vikings. The Lions opened the scoring in the first quarter via a 25-yard field goal by Jake Bates. The Vikings finally got on the board in the second quarter via a one-yard touchdown pass from Kyler Murray to Justin Jefferson. The Lions scored the final points of the half via a 37-yard field goal by Bates with two seconds remaining, which made the score 7–6 in favor of Minnesota at halftime. The Lions scored the only points of the third quarter to take the lead via a 30-yard touchdown run from Jahmyr Gibbs, followed by a failed two-point conversion run attempt. The Vikings regained the lead in the fourth quarter via an eight-yard touchdown pass from Murray to T. J. Hockenson, and a two-point conversion pass from Murray to Jordan Addison. The Lions scored the final points of the game via a seven-yard touchdown pass from Jared Goff to Jameson Williams, making the final score 19–15 in favor of Detroit and handing Minnesota its first loss of the season.

==== Week 9: at Miami Dolphins ====
Week 9: Detroit Lions at Miami Dolphins – Game summary

Quarter	1	2	3	4	Total
**Lions**	3	3	10	3	**19**
Dolphins	3	0	3	3	**9**

at Hard Rock Stadium, Miami Gardens, Florida

- Date: November 8
- Game time: 1:00 p.m. EST
- Game weather: Partly cloudy, 84 °F (29 °C)
- Game attendance: 62,984
- Referee: Land Clark
- TV announcers (CBS): Kevin Harlan, Trent Green and Melanie Collins
- Recap, Game Book

Game information

**First quarter**

- DET – Jake Bates 28-yard field goal, 8:22. Lions 3–0. **Drive: 12 plays, 50 yards, 6:38.**
- MIA – Zane Gonzalez 34-yard field goal, 1:02. Tied 3–3. **Drive: 6, plays, 23 yards, 4:01.**

**Second quarter**

- DET – Jake Bates 40-yard field goal, 3:30. Lions 6–3. **Drive: 8 plays, 35 yards, 4:35.**

**Third quarter**

- DET – Jake Bates 33-yard field goal, 9:14. Lions 9–3. **Drive: 8 plays, 12 yards, 4:09.**
- MIA – Zane Gonzalez 52-yard field goal, 4:00. Lions 9–6. **Drive: 8, plays, 26 yards, 5:14.**
- DET – Jahmyr Gibbs 8-yard run (Jake Bates kick), 1:20. Lions 16–6. **Drive: 6 plays, 65 yards, 2:40.**

**Fourth quarter**

- MIA – Zane Gonzalez 34-yard field goal, 9:26. Lions 16–9. **Drive: 11, plays, 55 yards, 6:54.**
- DET – Jake Bates 43-yard field goal, 4:28. Lions 19–9. **Drive: 9 plays, 46 yards, 4:58.**

**Top passers**

- DET – Jared Goff – 17/25, 170 yards, INT
- MIA – Malik Willis – 13/25, 128 yards, INT

**Top rushers**

- DET – Jahmyr Gibbs – 20 rushes, 74 yards, TD
- MIA – Ollie Gordon II – 16 rushes, 55 yards

**Top receivers**

- DET – Amon-Ra St. Brown – 8 receptions, 86 yards
- MIA – Caleb Douglas – 6 receptions, 70 yards

In week 9, the Lions visited the Miami Dolphins. The Lions opened the scoring in the first quarter via a 28-yard field goal by Jake Bates. The Dolphins responded with a 34-yard field goal by Zane Gonzalez to tie the game. The Lions scored the only points of the second quarter via a 40-yard field goal by Bates, which made the score 6–3 in favor of Detroit at half-time. The teams exchanged field goals in the third quarter, first a 33-yard field goal by Bates for Detroit, then a 52-yard field goal by Gonzalez for Miami. Detroit scored the final points of the quarter via an eight-yard touchdown run from Jahmyr Gibbs. The teams then exchanged field goals in the fourth quarter, first a 34-yard field goal by Gonzalez for Miami, then a 43-yard field goal by Bates for Detroit, making the final score 19–9 in favor of Detroit.

==== Week 10: vs. New England Patriots ====
NFL Germany Game

Week 10: New England Patriots at Detroit Lions – Game summary

Quarter	1	2	3	4	Total
Patriots	3	0	0	7	**10**
**Lions**	7	14	7	7	**35**

at Allianz Arena, Munich, Germany

- Date: November 15
- Game time: 3:30 p.m. CET/9:30 a.m. EST
- Game weather: Cloudy, 52 °F (11 °C)
- Game attendance: 70,225
- Referee: Clay Martin
- TV announcers (Fox): Joe Davis, Greg Olsen and Pam Oliver
- Recap, Game Book

Game information

**First quarter**

- NE – Andy Borregales 33-yard field goal, 9:12. Patriots 3–0. **Drive: 11 plays, 60 yards, 5:48.**
- DET – Amon-Ra St. Brown 56-yard pass from Jared Goff (Jake Bates kick), 6:13. Lions 7–3. **Drive: 6 plays, 70 yards, 2:59.**

**Second quarter**

- DET – Isaac TeSlaa 12-yard pass from Jared Goff (Jake Bates kick), 12:57. Lions 14–3. **Drive: 11 plays, 97 yards, 5:28.**
- DET – Jahmyr Gibbs 5-yard run (Jake Bates kick), 2:06. Lions 21–3. **Drive: 7 plays, 84 yards, 2:53.**

**Third quarter**

- DET – Amon-Ra St. Brown 28-yard pass from Jared Goff (Jake Bates kick), 8:16. Lions 28–3. **Drive: 7 plays, 54 yards, 3:30.**

**Fourth quarter**

- NE – Lan Larison 10-yard pass from Tommy DeVito (Andy Borregales kick), 12:40. Lions 28–10. **Drive: 13 plays, 87 yards, 6:30.**
- DET – Jahmyr Gibbs 28-yard run (Jake Bates kick), 8:56. Lions 35–10. **Drive: 6 plays, 60 yards, 3:44.**

**Top passers**

- NE – Tommy DeVito – 12/24, 81 yards, TD, INT
- DET – Jared Goff – 20/31, 303 yards, 3 TD, 2 INT

**Top rushers**

- NE – Corey Kiner – 10 rushes, 25 yards
- DET – Jahmyr Gibbs – 22 rushes, 153 yards, 2 TD

**Top receivers**

- NE – Mack Hollins – 5 receptions, 48 yards
- DET – Jahmyr Gibbs – 7 receptions, 99 yards

In week 10, the Lions hosted the New England Patriots in Munich, Germany as part of the NFL International Series. The Patriots opened the scoring in the first quarter via a 33-yard field goal by Andy Borregales. The Lions responded with a 56-yard touchdown pass from Jared Goff to Amon-Ra St. Brown. The Lions scored 14 points in the second quarter via a 12-yard touchdown pass from Goff to Isaac TeSlaa and a five-yard touchdown run from Jahmyr Gibbs, which made the score 21–3 in favor of Detroit at half-time. The Lions extended their lead in the third quarter via a 28-yard touchdown pass from Goff to St. Brown. The Patriots scored their only points of the second-half via a ten-yard touchdown pass from Tommy DeVito to Lan Larison. The Lions scored the final points of the game via a 28-yard touchdown run from Gibbs, making the final score 35–10 in favor of Detroit. Also, with the win, the Lions take 1st place in the NFC North.

==== Week 11: vs. Tampa Bay Buccaneers ====
Week 11: Tampa Bay Buccaneers at Detroit Lions – Game summary

Quarter	1	2	3	4	Total
Buccaneers	0	7	7	7	**21**
**Lions**	0	10	7	14	**31**

at Ford Field, Detroit, Michigan

- Date: November 22
- Game time: 1:00 p.m. EST
- Game weather: None (indoor stadium)
- Game attendance: 64,024
- Referee: Adrian Hill
- TV announcers (Fox): Kevin Kugler, Daryl Johnston and Allison Williams
- Recap, Game Book

Game information

**First quarter**

- No scoring plays

**Second quarter**

- DET – Amon-Ra St. Brown 14-yard pass from Jared Goff (Jake Bates kick), 10:37. Lions 7–0. **Drive: 14 plays, 90 yards, 7:22.**
- DET – Jake Bates 36-yard field goal, 1:48. Lions 10–0. **Drive: 7 plays, 48 yards, 3:38.**
- TB – Ted Hurst 23-yard pass from Baker Mayfield (Chase McLaughlin kick), 0:04. Lions 10–7. **Drive: 9 plays, 65 yards, 1:44.**

**Third quarter**

- DET – Jameson Williams 57-yard pass from Jared Goff (Jake Bates kick), 9:01. Lions 17–7. **Drive: 6 plays, 83 yards, 2:55.**
- TB – Bucky Irving 1-yard rush (Chase McLaughlin kick), 2:41. Lions 17–14. **Drive: 12 plays, 70 yards, 6:20.**

**Fourth quarter**

- DET – Jahmyr Gibbs 1-yard rush (Jake Bates kick), 5:24. Lions 24–14. **Drive: 9 plays, 59 yards, 4:52.**
- DET – Jahmyr Gibbs 4-yard rush (Jake Bates kick), 1:55. Lions 31–14. **Drive: 6 plays, 34 yards, 1:21.**
- TB – Ted Hurst 4-yard pass from Baker Mayfield (Chase McLaughlin kick), 0:08. Lions 31–21. **Drive: 7 plays, 65 yards, 1:47.**

**Top passers**

- TB – Baker Mayfield – 20/33, 187 yards, 2 TD
- DET – Jared Goff – 20/28, 279 yards, 2 TD

**Top rushers**

- TB – Bucky Irving – 18 rushes, 68 yards, TD
- DET – Jahmyr Gibbs – 23 rushes, 98 yards, 2 TD

**Top receivers**

- TB – Ted Hurst – 5 reception, 56 yards, 2 TD
- DET – Jameson Williams – 4 receptions, 93 yards, TD

In week 11, the Lions hosted the Tampa Bay Buccaneers.

==== Week 12: vs. Chicago Bears ====
Thanksgiving Day games

Week 12: Chicago Bears at Detroit Lions – Game summary

Quarter	1	2	3	4	Total
Bears	0	0	0	0	**0**
Lions	0	0	0	0	**0**

at Ford Field, Detroit, Michigan

- Date: November 26
- Game time: 1:00 p.m. EST
- Game weather: None (indoor stadium)
- TV announcers (CBS): Jim Nantz, J. J. Watt and Tracy Wolfson
- Preview

For their annual Thanksgiving Day game, the Lions will host their divisional rival, the Chicago Bears.

=== Standings ===
==== Division ====
NFC North
	W	L	T	PCT	DIV	CONF	PF	PA	STK
Detroit Lions	8	2	0	.800	2–0	5–1	288	220	W6
Chicago Bears	8	2	0	.800	0–2	6–2	262	197	W5
Minnesota Vikings	7	2	0	.778	3–1	5–1	176	126	W1
Green Bay Packers	6	4	0	.600	1–3	4–4	226	221	L1

==== Conference ====
NFC
Seed	Team	Division	W	L	T	PCT	DIV	CONF	SOS	SOV	STK
**Division leaders**
1	San Francisco 49ers	West	8	1	0	.889	3–0	5–1	.428	.444	W2
2 (Note: Detroit wins tie break over Chicago based on division record.)	Detroit Lions	North	8	2	0	.800	2–0	5–1	.440	.375	W6
3	New York Giants	East	5	3	1	.611	2–1–1	3–3–1	.356	.308	L1
4	Carolina Panthers	South	5	5	0	.500	2–1	4–3	.510	.412	W2
**Wild cards**
5	Chicago Bears	North	8	2	0	.800	0–2	6–2	.434	.375	W5
6	Minnesota Vikings	North	7	2	0	.778	3–1	5–1	.516	.423	W1
7 (Note: Green Bay wins tie break over Seattle based on conference record. Division tie break was initially used to eliminate LA Rams (see below).)	Green Bay Packers	North	6	4	0	.600	1–3	4–4	.535	.459	L1
**In the hunt**
8 (Note: Seattle wins tie break over LA Rams based on division record.)	Seattle Seahawks	West	6	4	0	.600	2–1	2–3	.515	.393	W2
9	Los Angeles Rams	West	6	4	0	.600	1–2	4–2	.485	.345	W4
10	Dallas Cowboys	East	5	6	0	.455	2–1	2–5	.400	.290	W1
11	Washington Commanders	East	3	5	1	.389	2–2–1	3–4–1	.506	.500	W1
12 (Note: Tampa Bay wins tie break over Philadelphia based on conference record. Division tie break was initially used to eliminate Atlanta and New Orleans (see below).) (Note: Tampa Bay wins tie break over Atlanta and New Orleans based on head-to-head record.)	Tampa Bay Buccaneers	South	3	7	0	.300	2–0	3–4	.616	.419	L2
13 (Note: Atlanta wins tie break over Philadephia based on conference record. Division tie break was initially used to eliminate New Orleans (see below).) (Note: Atlanta wins tie break over New Orleans based on head-to-head victory.)	Atlanta Falcons	South	3	7	0	.300	1–2	3–3	.586	.586	L3
14 (Note: New Orleans wins tie break over Philadelphia based on conference record.)	New Orleans Saints	South	3	7	0	.300	0–2	1–5	.571	.517	L2
15	Philadelphia Eagles	East	3	7	0	.300	1–3	1–6	.521	.362	W1
16	Arizona Cardinals	West	3	8	0	.273	1–4	2–6	.621	.400	L3
