= Garrett Wilson =

American football player (born 2000)

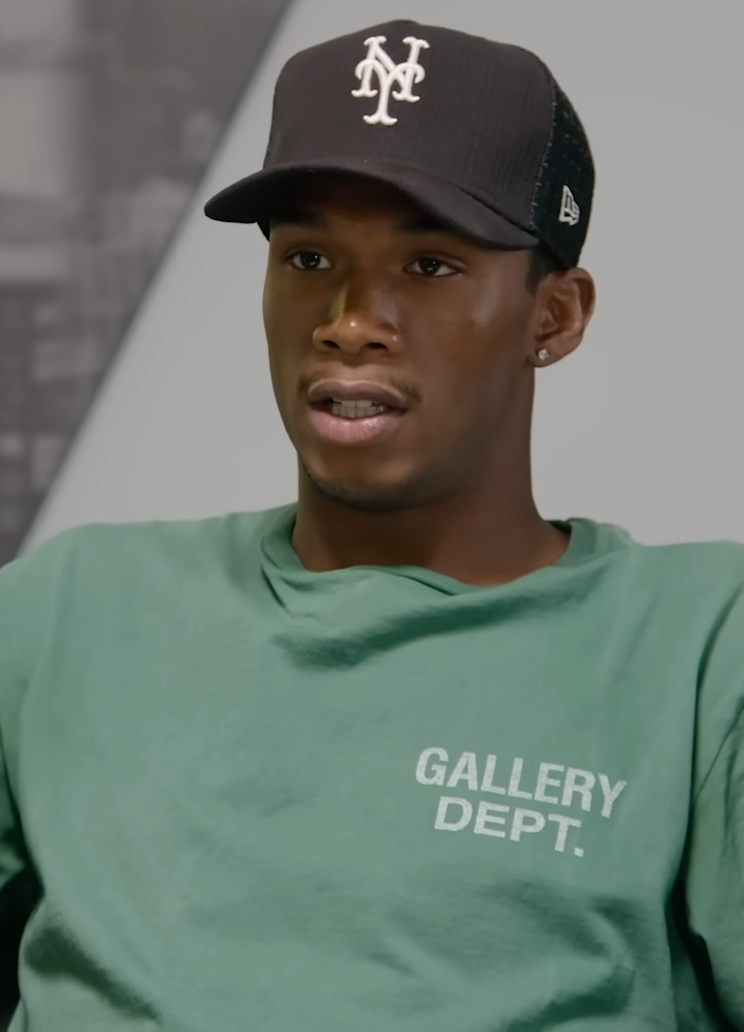
- Wilson in 2025

No. 5 – New York Jets
- Position: Wide receiver
- Roster status: Active

Personal information
- Born: July 22, 2000 (age 26); Chicago, Illinois, U.S.
- Listed height: 6 ft 0 in (1.83 m)
- Listed weight: 183 lb (83 kg)

Career information
- High school: Lake Travis (Austin, Texas)
- College: Ohio State (2019–2021)
- NFL draft: 2022: 1st round, 10th overall pick

Career history
- New York Jets (2022–present)

Awards and highlights
- NFL Offensive Rookie of the Year (2022); PFWA All-Rookie Team (2022); First-team All-Big Ten (2020); Second-team All-Big Ten (2021)

Career NFL statistics as of Week 10, 2026
- Receptions: 365
- Receiving yards: 4,277
- Receiving touchdowns: 21
- Stats at Pro Football Reference

Garrett Wilson (born July 22, 2000) is an American professional football wide receiver for the New York Jets of the National Football League (NFL). He played college football for the Ohio State Buckeyes and was selected 10th overall by the Jets in the 2022 NFL draft. Wilson was named the NFL Offensive Rookie of the Year.

== Early life ==
Wilson was born in Chicago on July 22, 2000, but grew up in Dublin, Ohio (a suburb of Columbus) until the age of 11. He attended Lake Travis High School in Austin, Texas, winning a 6A state championship along with Charlie Brewer in 2016; Wilson would go on to break multiple Lake Travis wide receiver records, including total career receptions (204), total yards (3,359) and total touchdowns (55). Wilson played in the 2019 All-American Bowl. A five-star recruit, he was ranked as the second-highest receiver and committed to play college football at Ohio State University.

== College career ==
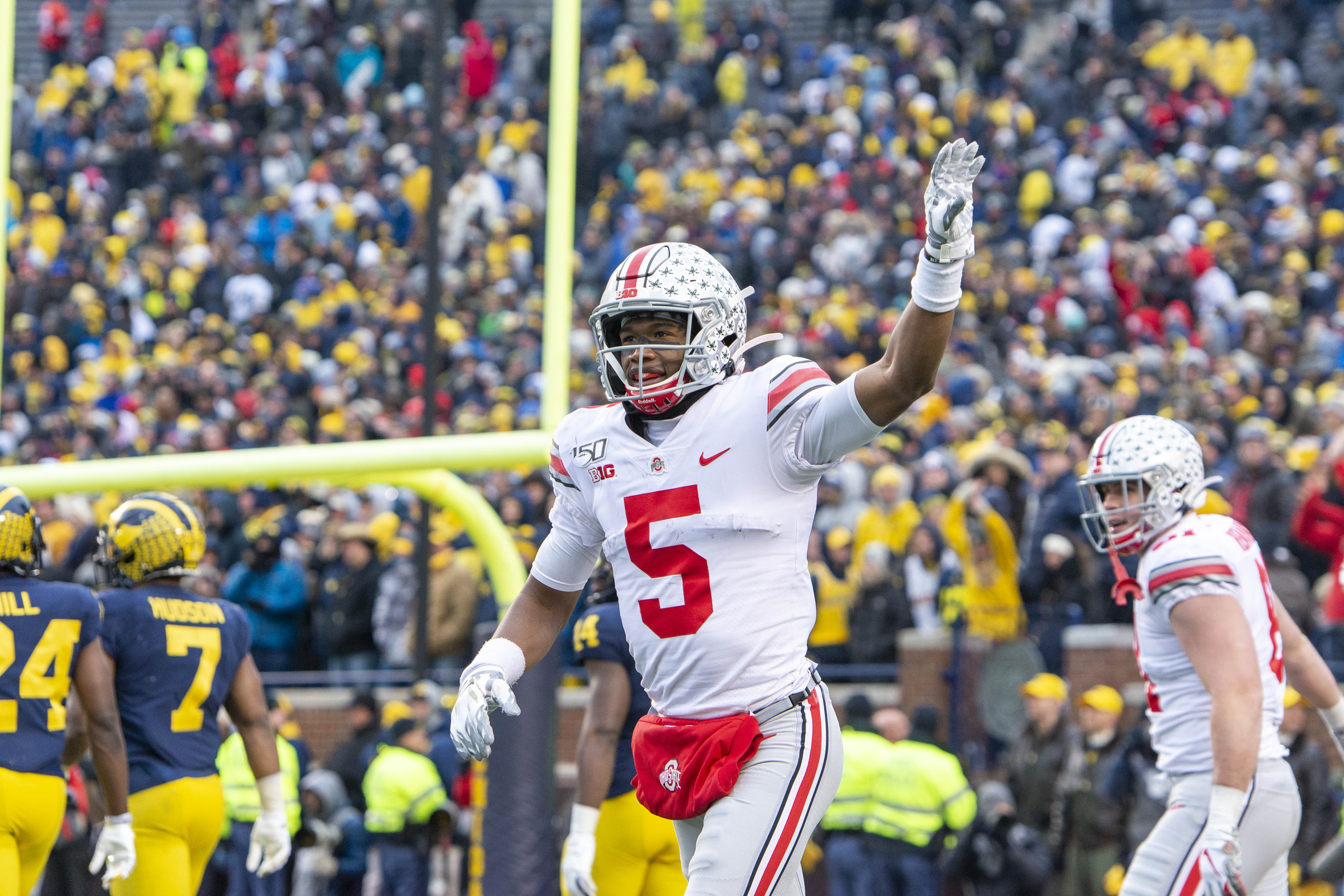
Wilson playing for Ohio State as a freshman.

As a true freshman at Ohio State in 2019, Wilson played in all 14 games and had 30 receptions for 432 yards and five touchdowns. Entering 2020, he was moved from an outside receiver to slot receiver. On November 21, 2020, Wilson became the second player in school history to record four straight games with at least 100 yards receiving. Wilson opted out of the 2022 Rose Bowl to focus on preparing for the 2022 NFL draft.

== Professional career ==
Pre-draft measurables
Height	Weight	Arm length	Hand span	Wingspan	40-yard dash	10-yard split	20-yard split	20-yard shuttle	Vertical jump	Broad jump
5 ft 11 3/4 in (1.82 m)	183 lb (83 kg)	32 in (0.81 m)	9 7/8 in (0.25 m)	6 ft 4 1/2 in (1.94 m)	4.38 s	1.49 s	2.56 s	4.36 s	36.0 in (0.91 m)	10 ft 3 in (3.12 m)
All values from NFL Combine

Wilson was drafted in the first round with the 10th overall by the New York Jets in the 2022 NFL draft. The Jets used the selection that was previously obtained in a 2020 trade that sent Jamal Adams to the Seattle Seahawks. He made his NFL debut in Week 1 against the Baltimore Ravens. In Week 2, against the Cleveland Browns, he recorded his first two NFL touchdowns as part of an eight-reception, 102-yard performance in the 31–30 victory. In Week 8, against the New England Patriots, he had six receptions for 115 receiving yards in the 22–17 loss. In Week 12, against the Chicago Bears, he had two receiving touchdowns in the 31–10 victory. In Week 13, against the Minnesota Vikings, he had eight receptions for 162 receiving yards in the 27–22 loss. He finished his rookie season with 83 receptions for 1,103 receiving yards and four receiving touchdowns. He set franchise rookie records for receptions and receiving yards in a single season. He was named to the PFWA All-Rookie Team.

On February 9, 2023, Wilson was awarded the Associated Press NFL Offensive Rookie of the Year. Wilson started all 17 games in the 2023 season. He finished with 95 receptions for 1,042 yards and three touchdowns.

On January 9, 2024, Wilson changed his jersey number from 17 to 5, the number he used in college. The number 5 was originally worn by punter Thomas Morstead.

In Week 9 of the 2024 season, Wilson had nine catches for 90 yards and two touchdowns in a 21–13 win over the Houston Texans, earning AFC Offensive Player of the Week. In the 2024 season, Wilson recorded 101 receptions for 1,104 yards and seven touchdowns.

On April 21, 2025, the Jets picked up the fifth-year option on Wilson's contract. On July 14, Wilson signed a four-year, $130 million contract extension with the Jets. On November 13, he was placed on injured reserve due to a knee sprain. On December 19, head coach Aaron Glenn confirmed that Wilson would be shut down for the remainder of the season. He finished the 2025 season with 36 receptions for 395 yards and four touchdowns.

== Career statistics ==
Legend
**Bold**	Career high

=== NFL ===
Year	Team	Games		Receiving					Rushing					Fumbles	
Year	Team	GP	GS	Rec	Yds	Y/R	Lng	TD	Att	Yds	Y/A	Lng	TD	Fum	Lost
2022	NYJ	17	12	83	1,103	**13.3**	60	4	**4**	4	1.0	**7**	0	**2**	1
2023	NYJ	17	17	95	1,042	11.0	**68**	3	**4**	0	0.0	6	0	**2**	**2**
2024	NYJ	17	17	**101**	**1,104**	10.9	42	**7**	2	**5**	**2.5**	5	0	**2**	**2**
2025	NYJ	7	7	36	395	11.0	33	4	0	0	0.0	0	0	1	0
2026	NYJ	9	9	50	633	12.7	32	3	0	0	0.0	0	0	1	0
Career		67	62	365	4,277	11.7	68	21	10	9	0.9	7	0	8	5

=== College ===
Year	Team	GP	Receiving					Rushing				
Year	Team	GP	Rec	Yds	Avg	Lng	TD	Att	Yds	Avg	Lng	TD
2019	Ohio State	14	30	432	14.4	47	5	0	0	0.0	0	0
2020	Ohio State	8	43	723	**16.8**	65	6	2	67	**33.3**	**62**	0
2021	Ohio State	11	**70**	**1,058**	15.1	**77**	**12**	**4**	**76**	19.0	51	**1**
Career		33	143	2,213	15.5	77	23	6	143	23.8	62	1

== Personal life ==
Wilson's father, Kenny Wilson, played basketball at Davidson College. Wilson has been friends with New York Mets third baseman Brett Baty since childhood.
