= Brian Duker =

American football coach (born 1989)

New York Jets
- Title: Defensive coordinator

Personal information
- Born: July 15, 1989 (age 37); Baltimore, Maryland, U.S.

Career information
- High school: Calvert Hall (Towson, Maryland)
- College: Towson University

Career history
- Towson (2009–2011) Student assistant; Bryant (2011–2012) Graduate assistant; Missouri (2013–2014); Graduate assistant (2013); Defensive quality control (2014); Cleveland Browns (2015) Defensive intern; San Francisco 49ers (2016) Defensive analyst; Baltimore Ravens (2018–2020); Defensive staff assistant (2018); Defensive analyst (2019–2020); Detroit Lions (2021–2023); Defensive assistant (2021); Safeties coach (2022); Defensive backs coach (2023); Miami Dolphins (2024–2025) Secondary coach & pass game coordinator; New York Jets (2026–present) Defensive coordinator
- Coaching profile at Pro Football Reference

Brian Duker (born July 15, 1989) is an American professional football coach who is the defensive coordinator for the New York Jets of the National Football League (NFL). He previously served as the pass game coordinator for the Miami Dolphins.

Duker attended Towson University. He previously served as an assistant coach with the Detroit Lions, Baltimore Ravens, San Francisco 49ers, Cleveland Browns, Missouri, and Bryant University.

== Coaching career ==
=== Bryant University ===
Duker began his coaching career at Bryant University as a Graduate Assistant for two seasons.

=== University of Missouri ===
Duker then moved on to the University of Missouri where he served as a graduate assistant and then defensive quality control on Gary Pinkel's staff. The Tigers reached the SEC Championship game both of the seasons Duker was in Columbia.

=== Cleveland Browns ===
Duker joined the Cleveland Browns as a defensive intern in 2015 under Head Coach Mike Pettine.

=== San Francisco 49ers ===
Duker joined the San Francisco 49ers as a defensive analyst in 2016 under Head Coach Chip Kelly.

=== Baltimore Ravens ===
Duker joined John Harbaugh's staff with the Baltimore Ravens as a defensive staff assistant in 2018 and then spent 2019-2020 as a defensive coaching analyst.

=== Detroit Lions ===
Duker left Baltimore to join Dan Campbell's Detroit Lions staff in 2021. He initially served as a Defensive Assistant. After the 2021 season, he was promoted to Safeties Coach. During the 2022 season he was promoted to interim defensive backs coach when Aubrey Pleasant was let go following the Lions Week 8 loss to the Miami Dolphins. Following the growth of the Lions defensive secondary, the team confirmed that Duker would continue as the defensive backs coach in 2023.

The Lions young secondary players showed great growth under Duker's direction. Kerby Joseph blossomed into a feared player. As a rookie, Brian Branch was also quick to experience success in the NFL.

=== Miami Dolphins ===
Duker left the Lions to become the Miami Dolphins Secondary Coach and Defensive Passing Game Coordinator in early 2024.

Before the 2025 Season, NFL analysts believed the Dolphins would struggle because of lack of secondary talent. During the second half of the 2025 season, pundits felt that the Dolphins secondary was vastly outplaying that preseason assessment.

=== New York Jets ===
On January 28, 2026, the New York Jets hired Duker as their defensive coordinator under head coach Aaron Glenn.

== Personal life ==
Duker was born on July 15, 1989, in Maryland. He earned a bachelor's degree from Towson University, where he was a student assistant, and his MBA from Bryant University. He and his wife, CJ, have one son.
