= Hymie Elhai =

American football executive (born 1976)

Hymie Elhai (born April 1976) is an American football executive who is the president of the New York Jets of the National Football League (NFL).

== Early life ==
Elhai is a graduate of Rutgers Law School and Johns Hopkins University.

== Career ==
Elhai was promoted to President in September 2019. He assisted owner Christopher Johnson in hiring Adam Gase as head coach prior to the 2019 season. Elhai is responsible for the business side of the Jets, while also working "to integrate football and business operations."

In September 2024, he unveiled an organizational rebrand, which consisted of three new versions of "legacy collection" uniforms, as well as new primary and secondary logos.

== Awards and honors ==
Elhai received the Distinguished Alumni Award from Rutgers School of Law at their Alumni Recognition Gala in October 2021. He was named one of Sports Business Journal's "40 Under 40" in 2016.
