= Christopher Johnson (American football executive) =

American businessman and sports team owner (born 1959)

- Born: Christopher Wold Johnson; August 7, 1959 (age 66); New Brunswick, New Jersey, U.S.
- Occupations: Businessman and sports executive
- Known for: Co-owner, vice-chairman of the New York Jets
- Spouse: Doris Wong (m. 2018)
- Parents: Bobby Johnson (father); Betty Wold (mother)
- Relatives: Woody Johnson (brother)

Christopher Wold Johnson (born August 7, 1959) is an American businessman who is the owner and vice chairman of the New York Jets of the National Football League (NFL). He is a great-grandson of Robert Wood Johnson I (co-founder of Johnson & Johnson), and the brother of Jets chairman Woody Johnson who served as the United States Ambassador to the United Kingdom from 2017 to 2021. He served as Jets chairman and CEO from 2017 to 2021.

== Early life ==
Johnson was born in New Brunswick, New Jersey, United States. He is the son of Betty (Wold) and Robert Wood Johnson III, president of Johnson & Johnson for four years. Johnson grew up with four siblings: Woody Johnson, Keith Johnson, Billy Johnson and Elizabeth "Libet" Johnson, in affluent areas of northern New Jersey. In 1975, Keith died of a cocaine overdose and Billy died in a motorcycle accident.

== Professional sports ==
=== New York Jets ===
Johnson has been an owner of the New York Jets alongside his brother, Woody, since 2000.

In 2017, Johnson became the CEO and chairman of the Jets following Woody's nomination and confirmation to be the United States Ambassador to the United Kingdom. Johnson served as operating head of the Jets during his brother's ambassadorial tenure. In his role as owner, Johnson oversaw the promotion of Hymie Elhai as team president, Joe Douglas as General Manager, and Robert Saleh as head coach. It was Christopher Johnson who fired Adam Gase following the 2020 season.

In addition to his Jets role, Johnson serves as a member of the NFL's Media Owned and Operated committee.

==== Stance on Kneeling ====
Johnson has supported the collective actions of his players' rights and privileges to kneel or to stay in the locker room during the pre-game playing of the American anthem. While he was one of the NFL Team owners that voted for the policy enacted in May 2018 to penalize and fine any player who does not stand during the Anthem he has offered to pay the fines incurred by players who choose to kneel or stay in the locker room stating:

"If somebody [on the Jets] takes a knee, that fine will be borne by the organization, by me, not the players." Johnson said. "I never want to put restrictions on the speech of our players. Do I prefer that they stand? Of course. But I understand if they felt the need to protest. There are some big, complicated issues that we're all struggling with, and our players are on the front lines. I don't want to come down on them like a ton of bricks, and I won't. There will be no club fines or suspensions or any sort of repercussions. If the team gets fined, that's just something I'll have to bear."
