= Aaron Glenn =

American football player and coach (born 1972)

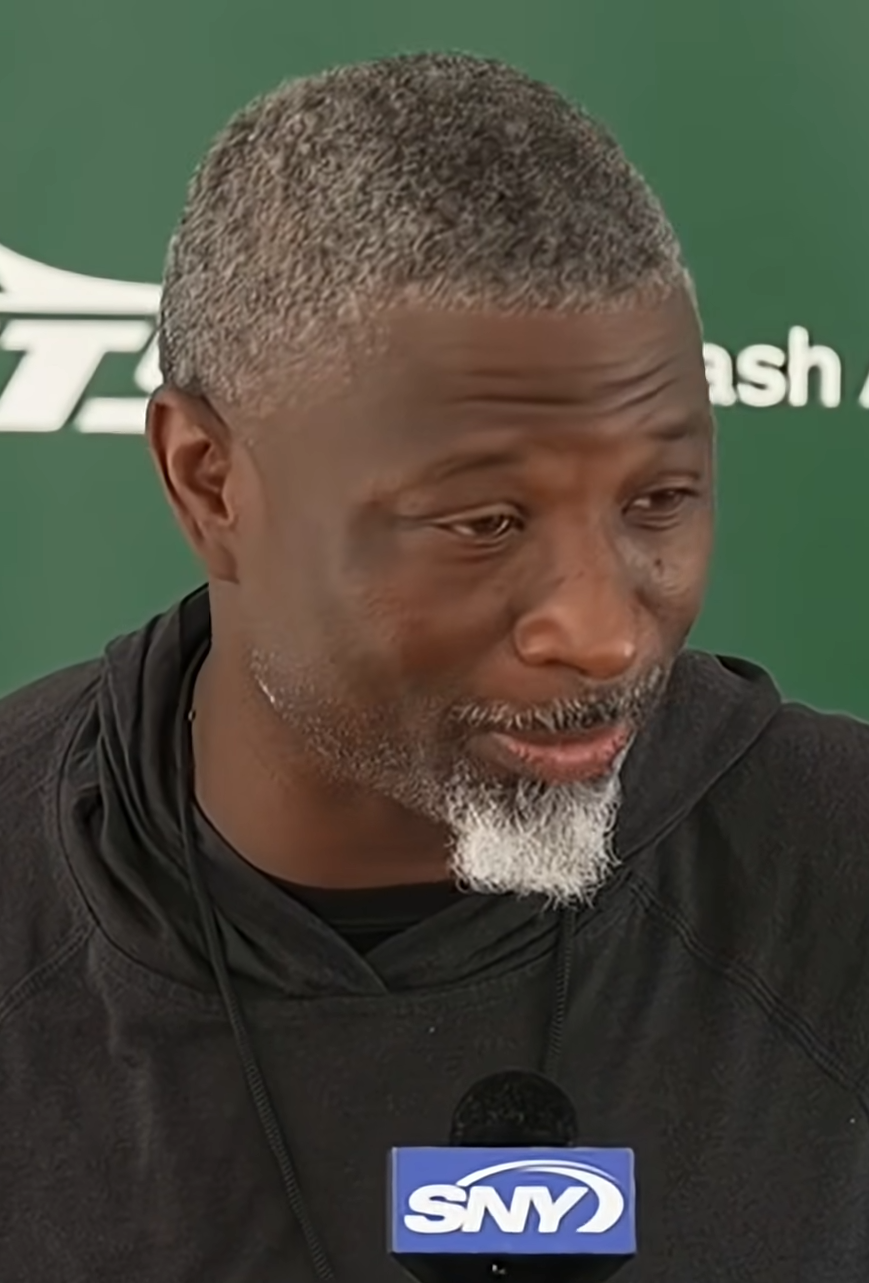
- Glenn with the New York Jets in 2025

New York Jets
- Title: Head coach

Personal information
- Born: July 16, 1972 (age 54); Humble, Texas, U.S.
- Listed height: 5 ft 9 in (1.75 m)
- Listed weight: 183 lb (83 kg)

Career information
- Position: Cornerback (No. 31, 26)
- High school: Nimitz (Houston, Texas)
- College: Navarro (1990–1991); Texas A&M (1992–1993)
- NFL draft: 1994: 1st round, 12th overall pick
- Expansion draft: 2002: 1st round, 3rd overall pick

Career history

Playing
- New York Jets (1994–2001); Houston Texans (2002–2004); Dallas Cowboys (2005–2006); Jacksonville Jaguars (2007); New Orleans Saints (2008)

Coaching
- Cleveland Browns (2014–2015) Assistant defensive backs coach; New Orleans Saints (2016–2020) Defensive backs coach; Detroit Lions (2021–2024) Defensive coordinator; New York Jets (2025–present) Head coach

Operations
- Houston Stallions (2012) General manager; New York Jets (2012–2013) Personnel scout

Awards and highlights
- 3× Pro Bowl (1997, 1998, 2002); New York Jets All-Time Four Decade Team; Consensus All-American (1993); SWC Defensive Player of the Year (1993); 2× First-team All-SWC (1992, 1993); SWC Newcomer of the Year (1992)

Career NFL statistics
- Tackles: 639
- Forced fumbles: 5
- Fumble recoveries: 7
- Pass deflections: 102
- Interceptions: 41
- Return yards: 2,697
- Total touchdowns: 8
- Stats at Pro Football Reference

Head coaching record
- Regular season: 5–22 (.185)
- Coaching profile at Pro Football Reference

Aaron Devone Glenn (born July 16, 1972) is an American professional football coach and former cornerback who is the head coach for the New York Jets of the National Football League (NFL). He previously served as the defensive coordinator for the Detroit Lions from 2021 to 2024, the defensive backs coach for the New Orleans Saints from 2016 to 2020, and as an assistant coach for the Cleveland Browns from 2014 to 2015.

Glenn played 15 seasons in the NFL. During his playing time, Glenn played for the New York Jets, Houston Texans, Dallas Cowboys, Jacksonville Jaguars, and New Orleans Saints. He played college football for the Texas A&M Aggies. His younger brother Jason Glenn played in the NFL from 2001 to 2006, with the Jets, Dolphins, and Vikings, and the two brothers were teammates during Jason's rookie season.

== Early life ==
Glenn was born in Humble, Texas. He played youth football in the Humble Area Football League. He attended Nimitz High School in Houston, Texas, where he was a four-year letterman for the Nimitz Cougars high school football team. As a senior, he posted over 1,000 rushing yards, over 200 receiving yards and seven interceptions. Glenn also lettered in basketball and track.

== Playing career ==
=== College ===
Glenn originally signed his letter of intent to play college football for the Purdue Boilermakers in 1990.

Glenn first attended Navarro College in Corsicana, Texas, where as a sophomore, he won all-conference and junior college All-America honors, after posting two interceptions, 60 tackles, and 15 pass deflections.

Glenn then transferred to Texas A&M University, where he played for the Aggies in 1992 and 1993. As a junior in 1992, he was the Southwest Conference (SWC) Newcomer of the Year and a first-team All-Southwest Conference selection.

As a senior in 1993, he registered 27 tackles, 13 passes defensed and led the nation with a 19.2-yard punt return average, while receiving first-team All-SWC and a consensus first-team All-American honors.

In 2000, he was inducted into the Texas A&M Sports Hall of Fame.

=== National Football League ===
Pre-draft measurables
Height	Weight	Arm length	Hand span	40-yard dash	Vertical jump	Bench press
5 ft 8 1/2 in (1.74 m)	184 lb (83 kg)	30 in (0.76 m)	8 7/8 in (0.23 m)	4.39 s	40.0 in (1.02 m)	9 reps
All values from NFL Combine

==== New York Jets ====
The New York Jets selected Glenn in the first round (12th overall) of the 1994 NFL draft. He played his first eight seasons in the NFL with the Jets, from 1994 to 2001. In 1996, Glenn set the team record for longest interception return with a 100-yard touchdown against the Miami Dolphins.

In 2001, Glenn started 12 games, missing three contests with a sprained knee. He had 39 tackles and 14 pass deflections, which led the team.

==== Houston Texans ====
The Houston Texans selected Glenn through the 2002 NFL expansion draft. He started 16 games at left cornerback, registering 75 tackles, five interceptions, 16 passes defensed and one sack. Glenn and teammate Gary Walker became the first Texans players to reach the NFL Pro Bowl in 2002.

In 2003, Glenn started 11 games and was declared inactive in two because of injury before being placed on the injured reserve list for the final three contests. He finished with 29 tackles, one interception and 16 passes defensed. The next year, Glenn started 16 games, with five interceptions and 14 passes defensed. He was released for salary cap reasons on April 26, 2005.

==== Dallas Cowboys ====
Glenn signed with the Dallas Cowboys before the 2005 season, reuniting him with Bill Parcells, who was his head coach with the New York Jets. Coming in as a 33 year old free agent, he surprised observers with his high level of play. Although he was projected to be involved only on the nickel defense, he started seven games in place of an injured Anthony Henry and recorded four interceptions to lead the team.

The next year, Glenn played in 16 games (one start) and was used mostly on the nickel defense, registering 20 tackles with one interception. In 2007, Wade Phillips was hired as the new head coach and released Glenn on September 1.

==== Jacksonville Jaguars ====
On September 3, 2007, Glenn signed with the Jacksonville Jaguars. He played in five games (four starts) and was declared inactive for eleven regular season games and two playoff games.

==== New Orleans Saints ====
Glenn signed as a free agent with the New Orleans Saints on April 7, 2008. He injured his ankle during the second game of the season, which limited his playing time until being placed on the injured reserve list on November 27.

== NFL career statistics ==
Legend
**Bold**	Career high

Year	Team	GP	Tackles				Fumbles			Interceptions					
Year	Team	GP	Cmb	Solo	Ast	Sck	FF	FR	Yds	Int	Yds	Avg	Lng	TD	PD
1994	NYJ	15	66	**56**	10	0.0	**2**	0	0	0	0	0	0	0	9
1995	NYJ	16	50	40	10	0.0	1	**1**	0	1	17	17	17	0	15
1996	NYJ	16	42	36	6	0.0	1	0	0	4	113	28	**100**	**2**	13
1997	NYJ	16	65	54	**11**	0.0	0	0	0	1	5	5	5	0	11
1998	NYJ	13	48	47	1	0.0	0	0	0	**6**	23	4	26	0	11
1999	NYJ	16	51	46	5	0.0	0	**1**	0	3	20	7	12	0	11
2000	NYJ	16	37	28	9	0.0	0	0	0	4	34	9	34	0	14
2001	NYJ	13	33	27	6	0.0	1	**1**	0	5	82	16	60	1	14
2002	HOU	16	**67**	**56**	**11**	**1.0**	0	0	0	5	**181**	**36**	70	**2**	**18**
2003	HOU	11	35	29	6	0.0	0	0	0	1	0	0	0	0	12
2004	HOU	16	63	55	8	0.0	1	0	0	5	40	8	23	0	14
2005	DAL	16	32	29	3	0.0	0	0	0	4	10	3	10	0	13
2006	DAL	16	22	20	2	0.0	0	0	0	1	7	7	7	0	6
2007	JAX	5	15	13	2	0.0	0	0	0	1	28	28	28	1	1
2008	NO	4	8	7	1	0.0	0	0	0	0	0	0	0	0	1
Career		205	634	543	91	1.0	6	3	0	41	560	13.7	100	6	163

== Executive career ==
=== Houston Stallions ===
Starting in 2012, Glenn held the position of general manager with the Houston Stallions of the Texas Lone Star Football League, an indoor league comprising exclusively teams from Texas.

=== New York Jets ===
In June 2012, Glenn was hired by the New York Jets, his former team, as a personnel scout.

== Coaching career ==
=== Cleveland Browns ===
On May 18, 2014, Glenn was named the assistant defensive backs coach for the Cleveland Browns.

=== New Orleans Saints ===
On January 13, 2016, Glenn was hired by the New Orleans Saints as their secondary coach.

=== Detroit Lions ===
On January 23, 2021, Glenn was hired by the Detroit Lions as their defensive coordinator under head coach Dan Campbell.

On February 24, 2023, Glenn signed a multi–year contract extension with the Lions. The following season, he led the defense to the second-fewest rushing yards allowed in the NFL. In the 2024 season, his defensive unit finished tied for second in the league for fewest passing touchdowns allowed.

=== New York Jets ===
On January 22, 2025, Glenn was hired as the head coach of the New York Jets. The Jets started off the season 0–7, before securing consecutive victories in weeks 8 and 10 over the Cincinnati Bengals and Cleveland Browns. The Jets finished in last place in the AFC East with a 3–14 record, and became the first team to end the regular season without a defensive interception since the statistic began being tracked in 1933. Following his initial season, Glenn had fired both his offensive and defensive coordinators, Tanner Engstrand and Steve Wilks.

On January 28, 2026, he hired Brian Duker, former Miami Dolphins secondary coach, as his new defensive coordinator. A week later, he hired Frank Reich, former head coach of the Indianapolis Colts and Carolina Panthers, as his new offensive coordinator.

== Head coaching record ==
Team	Year	Regular season					Postseason			
Team	Year	Won	Lost	Ties	Win %	Finish	Won	Lost	Win %	Result
NYJ	2025	3	14	0	.176	4th in AFC East	—	—	—	—
NYJ	2026	2	8	0	.200	3rd in AFC East	—	—	—	—
Total		5	22	0	.185		0	0	.000	

== Personal life ==
Glenn has been married to his college sweetheart Devaney Glenn since 1994. They have three children, two daughters and a son.
