= Jeremy Ruckert =

American football player (born 2000)

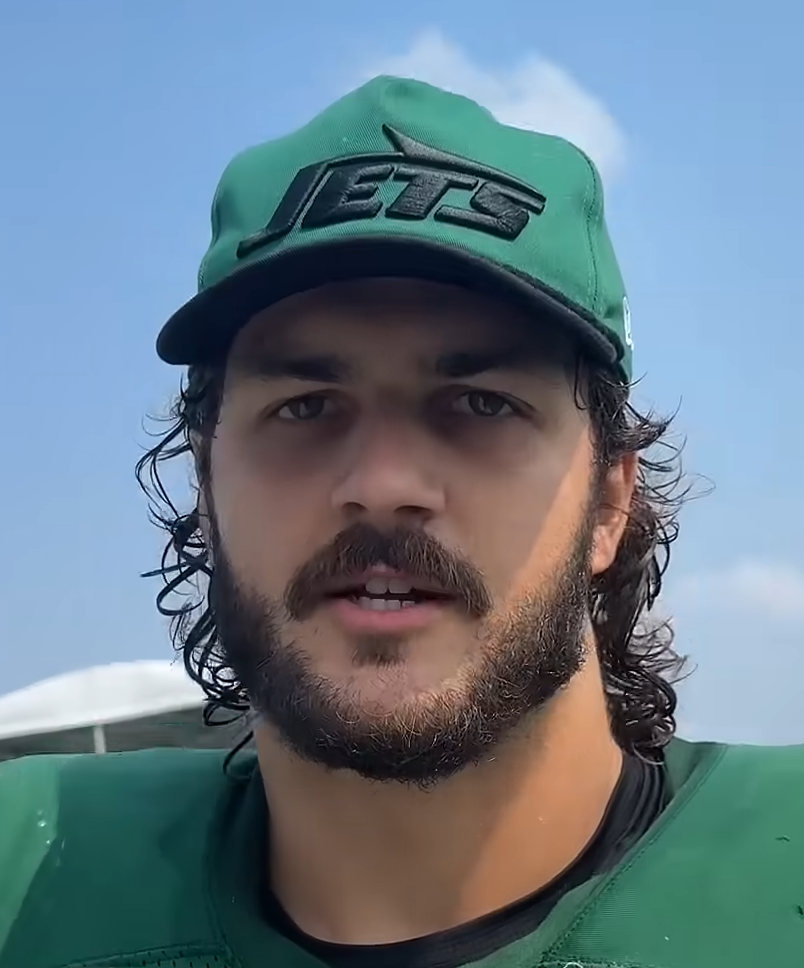
- Ruckert with the New York Jets in 2025

No. 89 – New York Jets
- Position: Tight end
- Roster status: Active

Personal information
- Born: August 11, 2000 (age 26); Lindenhurst, New York, U.S.
- Listed height: 6 ft 5 in (1.96 m)
- Listed weight: 250 lb (113 kg)

Career information
- High school: Lindenhurst Senior
- College: Ohio State (2018–2021)
- NFL draft: 2022: 3rd round, 101st overall pick

Career history
- New York Jets (2022–present)

Career NFL statistics as of 2025
- Receptions: 58
- Receiving yards: 443
- Receiving touchdowns: 1
- Stats at Pro Football Reference

Jeremy Ruckert (born August 11, 2000) is an American professional football tight end for the New York Jets of the National Football League (NFL). He played college football for the Ohio State Buckeyes and was selected 101st overall in the third round of the 2022 NFL draft.

== Early life ==
Ruckert attended Lindenhurst Senior High School in Lindenhurst, New York. During his career, he had 222 receptions for 3,133 yards and 37 touchdowns. As a senior, Ruckert was the New York Gatorade Football Player of the Year after catching 61 passes for 1,094 yards with 13 touchdowns and 61 tackles, 13 sacks and two interceptions. He played in the 2018 U. S. Army All-American Bowl. He committed to Ohio State University to play college football.

== College career ==
As a true freshman at Ohio State in 2018, Ruckert had one reception for 13 yards. He played in all 14 games his sophomore year in 2019, recording 14 receptions for 142 yards and four touchdowns. As a junior in 2020, he had 13 receptions for 151 receiving yards and five receiving touchdowns. As a senior in 2021, he had 26 receptions for 309 receiving yards and three receiving touchdowns.

== Professional career ==
Pre-draft measurables
Height	Weight	Arm length	Hand span	Wingspan	Bench press
6 ft 5 1/2 in (1.97 m)	252 lb (114 kg)	32 3/4 in (0.83 m)	10 1/8 in (0.26 m)	6 ft 7 1/4 in (2.01 m)	22 reps
All values from NFL Combine/Pro Day

Ruckert was drafted by the New York Jets in the third round, 101st overall, of the 2022 NFL draft. In Week 18 against the Miami Dolphins, Ruckert recorded his first career catch on an eight–yard reception from Joe Flacco. As a rookie, he appeared in nine games, logging his one catch, and contributed on special teams as well. In the 2023 season, he had 16 receptions for 151 yards in 15 games and six starts. In the 2024 season, he had 18 receptions for 105 yards in 17 games and nine starts. On September 14, 2025, Ruckert caught his first professional touchdown on a five-yard pass from Tyrod Taylor in a Jets 30–10 loss to the Buffalo Bills.

On December 17, 2025, Ruckert signed a two-year, $10 million contract extension with the Jets. He had 23 receptions for 179 yards and one touchdown in the 2025 season.

== NFL career statistics ==
=== Regular season ===
Year	Team	Games		Receiving				
Year	Team	GP	GS	Rec	Yds	Avg	Lng	TD
2022	NYJ	9	0	1	8	8.0	8	0
2023	NYJ	15	6	16	151	9.4	23	0
2024	NYJ	17	9	18	105	5.8	12	0
2025	NYJ	17	15	23	179	7.8	24	1
Career		58	30	58	443	7.6	24	1
