= Hanover County, Virginia =

County in Virginia, United States

- County
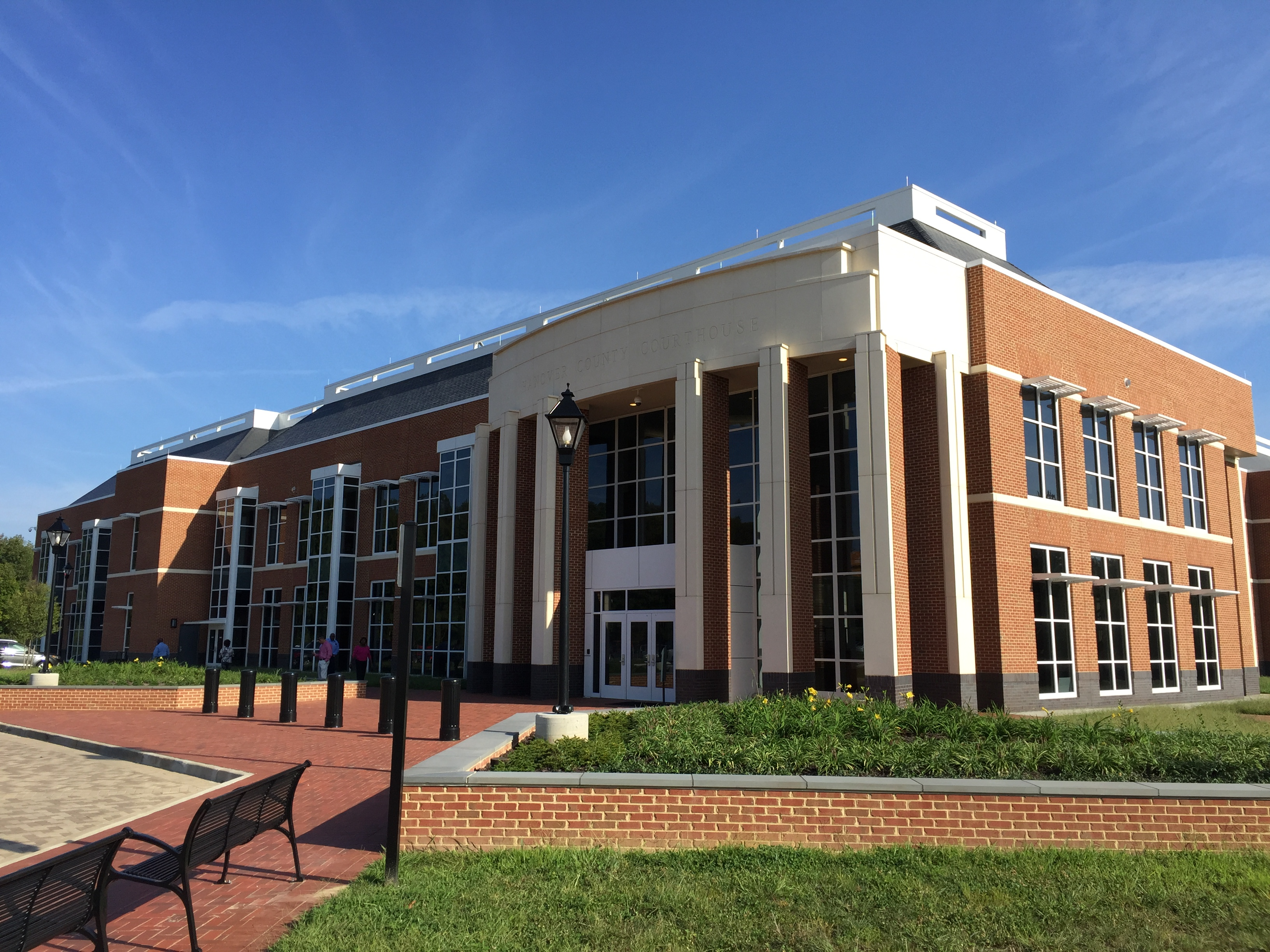
- Current Hanover County Courthouse

- Flag Seal

- Location within the U.S. state of Virginia
- Coordinates: 37°46′N 77°29′W
- Country: United States
- State: Virginia
- Founded: 1720
- Named for: Electorate of Hanover
- Seat: Hanover
- Largest CDP: Mechanicsville

Area
  - Total: 474 sq mi (1,230 km^{2})
  - Land: 469 sq mi (1,210 km^{2})
  - Water: 5 sq mi (13 km^{2}) 1.1%

Population (2020)
  - Total: 109,979
  - Estimate (2025): 116,423 ▲
  - Density: 234/sq mi (90.5/km^{2})
- Time zone: UTC−5 (Eastern)
  - Summer (DST): UTC−4 (EDT)
- Congressional districts: 1st, 5th
- Website: www.hanovercounty.gov

Hanover County is a county in the Commonwealth of Virginia. As of the 2020 census, the population was 109,979 with recent estimates indicating continued growth to around 116,000 amid suburban expansion in the Richmond metropolitan area. Its county seat is Hanover.

Hanover County is a part of the Greater Richmond Region.

== History ==
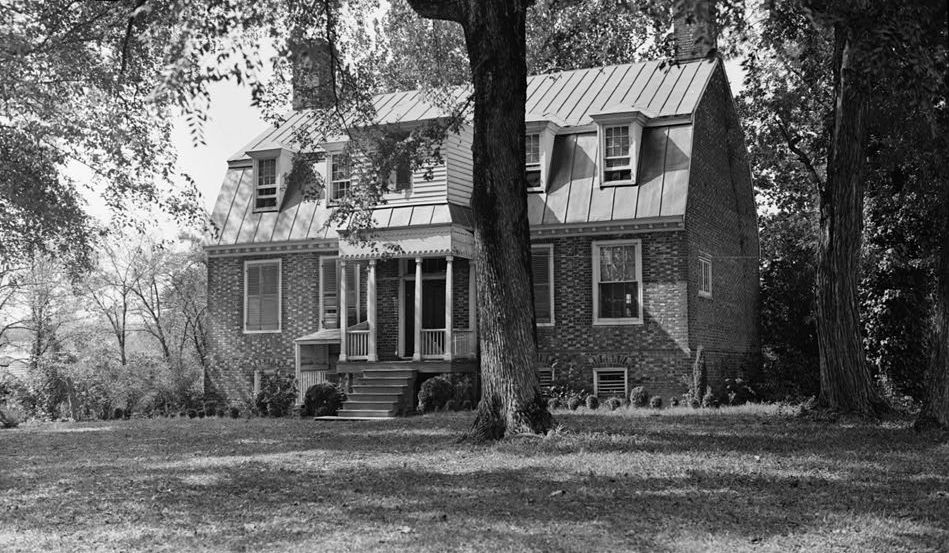
The Rural Plains, located on the grounds of the Richmond National Battlefield Park in Hanover County

Located in the western Tidewater region of Virginia, Hanover County was created on November 26, 1719, from the area of New Kent County called St. Peter's Parish. It was named for the Electorate of Hanover in Germany, because King George I of Great Britain was Elector of Hanover at the time. The county was developed by planters moving west from the Virginia tidewater, where soils had been exhausted by tobacco monoculture.

Hanover County was the birthplace and home of noted American statesman Patrick Henry. He reportedly married Sarah Shelton in the parlor of her family's house, Rural Plains, also known as Shelton House. At the Hanover Courthouse, Henry argued the case of the Parson's Cause in 1763, attacking the British Crown's attempt to set the salaries of clergy in the colony regardless of conditions in the local economy. The historic Hanover Courthouse is pictured in the county seal. Hanover County was also the birthplace of Henry Clay, who became known as a politician in Kentucky, author of the Missouri Compromise of 1820, and Secretary of State.

The Chickahominy River forms the border of the county in the Mechanicsville area. During the American Civil War and the 1862 Peninsula Campaign, the Union Army approached the river and could hear the bells of Richmond's churches. But they learned that the river was a major obstacle. Union General George B. McClellan failed in his attempt to get all his troops across it, intending to overwhelm the outnumbered Confederate forces defending Richmond. His failure to take Richmond has been said to have prolonged the war by almost three years. Hanover County was the site of Civil War battles due to its location between Richmond and northern Virginia, including the Seven Days Battles of the Peninsula Campaign and Battle of Cold Harbor in 1864.

The incorporated town of Ashland is located within Hanover County. Ashland is the second and current home of Randolph-Macon College.

In 1953, Barksdale Theatre was founded at the historic Hanover Tavern. It was the nation's first dinner theater and central Virginia's first professional theatre organization. The Barksdale company continues to produce live theatre at the Tavern, as well as at several locations in Richmond. It is recognized today as Central Virginia's leading professional theatre.

Kings Dominion amusement park opened in 1975 in Doswell and added to the county's economy. In January 2007, America's Promise named Hanover County as one of the top 100 communities for youth.

== Geography ==
According to the U.S. Census Bureau, the county has a total area of 474 square miles (1,230 km^{2}), of which 469 square miles (1,210 km^{2}) is land and 5 square miles (13 km^{2}) (1.1%) is water.

Hanover County is about 90 miles (145 km) south of Washington, D.C., and about 12 miles (19 km) north of Richmond, Virginia.

=== Adjacent counties ===
- Caroline County (north)
- Goochland County (southwest)
- Henrico County (south)
- King William County (northeast)
- Louisa County (west)
- New Kent County (east)
- Spotsylvania County (northwest)

=== Major highways ===
- I-95
- I-295
- US 1
- US 33
- US 301
- US 360
- SR 2
- SR 30
- SR 54
- SR 156
- SR 326

== Demographics ==
Historical population
Census	Pop.	Note	%±
1790	14,754		—
1800	14,403		−2.4%
1810	15,082		4.7%
1820	15,267		1.2%
1830	16,253		6.5%
1840	14,968		−7.9%
1850	15,153		1.2%
1860	17,222		13.7%
1870	16,455		−4.5%
1880	18,588		13.0%
1890	17,402		−6.4%
1900	17,618		1.2%
1910	17,200		−2.4%
1920	18,088		5.2%
1930	17,009		−6.0%
1940	18,500		8.8%
1950	21,985		18.8%
1960	27,550		25.3%
1970	37,479		36.0%
1980	50,398		34.5%
1990	63,306		25.6%
2000	86,320		36.4%
2010	99,863		15.7%
2020	109,979		10.1%
2025 (est.)	116,423	▲	5.9%
U.S. Decennial Census; 1790-1960 1900-1990; 1990-2000 2010 2020

=== Racial and ethnic composition ===
Hanover County, Virginia – Racial and ethnic composition Note: the US Census treats Hispanic/Latino as an ethnic category. This table excludes Latinos from the racial categories and assigns them to a separate category. Hispanics/Latinos may be of any race.
Race / Ethnicity (NH = Non-Hispanic)	Pop 1980	Pop 1990	Pop 2000	Pop 2010	Pop 2020	% 1980	% 1990	% 2000	% 2010	% 2020
White alone (NH)	43,469	56,191	75,753	85,391	88,869	86.25%	88.76%	87.76%	85.51%	80.81%
Black or African American alone (NH)	6,477	6,385	8,026	9,202	9,678	12.85%	10.09%	9.30%	9.21%	8.80%
Native American or Alaska Native alone (NH)	63	143	277	319	311	0.13%	0.23%	0.32%	0.32%	0.28%
Asian alone (NH)	94	255	669	1,333	2,021	0.19%	0.40%	0.78%	1.33%	1.84%
Native Hawaiian or Pacific Islander alone (NH)	x	x	6	31	32	x	x	0.01%	0.03%	0.03%
Other race alone (NH)	35	11	106	136	510	0.07%	0.02%	0.12%	0.14%	0.46%
Mixed race or Multiracial (NH)	x	x	636	1,335	4,620	x	x	0.74%	1.34%	4.20%
Hispanic or Latino (any race)	260	321	847	2,116	3,938	0.52%	0.51%	0.98%	2.12%	3.58%
Total	50,398	63,306	86,320	99,863	109,979	100.00%	100.00%	100.00%	100.00%	100.00%

=== 2020 census ===
As of the 2020 census, the county had a population of 109,979. The median age was 43.2 years. 22.0% of residents were under the age of 18 and 18.8% of residents were 65 years of age or older. For every 100 females there were 95.4 males, and for every 100 females age 18 and over there were 92.0 males age 18 and over.

The racial makeup of the county was 81.6% White, 8.9% Black or African American, 0.4% American Indian and Alaska Native, 1.9% Asian, 0.0% Native Hawaiian and Pacific Islander, 1.6% from some other race, and 5.7% from two or more races. Hispanic or Latino residents of any race comprised 3.6% of the population.

63.0% of residents lived in urban areas, while 37.0% lived in rural areas.

There were 41,417 households in the county, of which 32.5% had children under the age of 18 living with them and 23.0% had a female householder with no spouse or partner present. About 21.3% of all households were made up of individuals and 10.7% had someone living alone who was 65 years of age or older.

There were 43,184 housing units, of which 4.1% were vacant. Among occupied housing units, 82.0% were owner-occupied and 18.0% were renter-occupied. The homeowner vacancy rate was 1.0% and the rental vacancy rate was 3.8%.

=== 2010 Census ===
As of the 2010 United States census, there were 99,863 people living in the county. 86.7% were White, 9.3% Black or African American, 1.4% Asian, 0.4% Native American, 0.8% of some other race and 1.5% of two or more races; 2.1% were Hispanic or Latino (of any race).

As of the census of 2000, there were 86,320 people, 31,121 households, and 24,461 families living in the county. The population density was 183 people per square mile (71 people/km^{2}). There were 32,196 housing units at an average density of 68 units per square mile (26 units/km^{2}). The racial makeup of the county was 88.32% White, 9.34% Black or African American, 0.33% Native American, 0.79% Asian, 0.01% Pacific Islander, 0.37% from other races, and 0.83% from two or more races. 0.98% of the population were Hispanic or Latino of any race.

There were 31,121 households, out of which 39.50% had children under the age of 18 living with them, 66.40% were married couples living together, 9.30% had a female householder with no husband present, and 21.40% were non-families; 17.70% of all households were made up of individuals, and 6.80% had someone living alone who was 65 years of age or older. The average household size was 2.71, and the average family size was 3.07.

In the county, the population was spread out, with 27.10% under the age of 18, 6.90% from 18 to 24, 30.70% from 25 to 44, 24.80% from 45 to 64, and 10.60% who were 65 years of age or older. The median age was 37 years. For every 100 females there were 96.90 males; for every 100 females age 18 and over, there were 92.80 males.

The median income for a household in the county was $77,550, and the median income for a family was $90,812. The median income was $46,864 for males and $32,662 for females. The per capita income for the county was $34,241. About 3.54% of families and 5.50% of the population were below the poverty line, including 3.90% of those under age 18 and 5.80% of those age 65 or over.

== Government ==
=== Board of supervisors ===
- Ashland District: Faye O. Prichard (R)
- Beaverdam District: Aubrey M. "Bucky" Stanley (R)
- Chickahominy District: Danielle Grieshaber Floyd (R)
- Cold Harbor District: F. Michael Herzberg IV(Chariman)(R)
- Henry District: Sean M. Davis(Vice Chairman) (R)
- Mechanicsville District: Ryan M. Hudson (R)
- South Anna District: Susan P. Dibble (R)

=== Constitutional officers ===
- Clerk of the Circuit Court: Frank D. Hargrove, Jr. (R)
- Commissioner of the Revenue: T. Scott Harris (R)
- Commonwealth's Attorney: R. E. "Trip" Chalkley, III (R)
- Sheriff: Gregory Six (R)
- Treasurer: M. Scott Miller (R)

=== Law enforcement ===
Hanover County Sheriff's Office
- Abbreviation: HCSO

Agency overview
- Formed: 1720
- Employees: 236+

Jurisdictional structure
- Constituting instrument: Yes
- General nature: Local civilian police

Operational structure
- Headquarters: Hanover Courthouse, Virginia
- Deputys: 242
- Civilians: 2
- Agency executive: Gregory Six, Sheriff

Website
- Official website

The Hanover County Sheriff's Office (HCSO) is the primary law enforcement agency in Hanover County, Virginia. The HCSO was created shortly after the county was formed on November 26, 1720. The Sheriff is Gregory Six.

=== State and federal ===
Hanover County is represented by Republicans Ryan McDougle and Luther Cifers in the Virginia Senate, Republicans Buddy Fowler and Scott Wyatt in the Virginia House of Delegates and Republicans Rob Wittman and John McGuire in the U.S. House of Representatives.

Hanover County is a strongly Republican county; no Democratic presidential candidate has won it since Harry Truman in 1948, and it was one of four counties that did not vote for Mark Warner in his 2008 landslide. However, conservative Democrats represented it at the state level as late as the 1990s.

United States presidential election results for Hanover County, Virginia
Year	Republican		Democratic		Third party(ies)	
Year	No.	%	No.	%	No.	%
1880	884	37.91%	1,447	62.05%	1	0.04%
1884	1,488	45.04%	1,816	54.96%	0	0.00%
1888	1,511	46.72%	1,721	53.22%	2	0.06%
1892	1,064	37.05%	1,536	53.48%	272	9.47%
1896	1,337	46.12%	1,499	51.71%	63	2.17%
1900	1,201	49.67%	1,203	49.75%	14	0.58%
1904	261	32.71%	527	66.04%	10	1.25%
1908	204	27.72%	522	70.92%	10	1.36%
1912	87	12.39%	609	86.75%	6	0.85%
1916	102	11.67%	760	86.96%	12	1.37%
1920	224	19.77%	903	79.70%	6	0.53%
1924	135	14.92%	732	80.88%	38	4.20%
1928	592	41.60%	831	58.40%	0	0.00%
1932	238	17.87%	1,073	80.56%	21	1.58%
1936	327	18.84%	1,397	80.47%	12	0.69%
1940	364	21.18%	1,347	78.36%	8	0.47%
1944	575	28.04%	1,471	71.72%	5	0.24%
1948	838	38.06%	1,048	47.59%	316	14.35%
1952	2,257	59.76%	1,518	40.19%	2	0.05%
1956	2,272	54.07%	1,109	26.39%	821	19.54%
1960	3,020	59.39%	2,023	39.78%	42	0.83%
1964	4,879	62.95%	2,864	36.95%	8	0.10%
1968	5,425	50.01%	2,079	19.17%	3,343	30.82%
1972	11,095	81.20%	2,200	16.10%	368	2.69%
1976	11,559	64.72%	6,069	33.98%	231	1.29%
1980	14,262	70.02%	5,383	26.43%	723	3.55%
1984	18,800	79.26%	4,831	20.37%	87	0.37%
1988	20,570	76.99%	5,985	22.40%	163	0.61%
1992	20,336	59.36%	8,021	23.41%	5,904	17.23%
1996	22,086	63.60%	9,880	28.45%	2,758	7.94%
2000	28,614	68.81%	12,044	28.96%	927	2.23%
2004	35,404	71.36%	13,941	28.10%	266	0.54%
2008	37,344	66.39%	18,447	32.80%	457	0.81%
2012	39,940	67.63%	18,294	30.98%	824	1.40%
2016	39,630	63.15%	19,382	30.89%	3,741	5.96%
2020	44,318	62.45%	25,307	35.66%	1,342	1.89%
2024	45,569	62.08%	26,733	36.42%	1,102	1.50%

== Education ==
Hanover County Public Schools has fifteen elementary schools, four middle schools, four high schools, one alternative school, and one technology school. The four high schools are Atlee High School, Hanover High School, Mechanicsville High School, and Patrick Henry High School. Forbes magazine named Hanover County as one of the top fifty counties in the United States for student achievement vs. cost per student.

== Economy ==
Hanover County has the lowest real estate property tax rate in the Richmond Region, which makes for a competitive business location. Some of the major businesses that have taken advantage of the tax rate include: Bass Pro Shops, FedEx Ground, and The Vitamin Shoppe. These businesses located in the county with help from the Hanover County Economic Development and the Greater Richmond Partnership, regional economic development organizations.

Top employers

Employer	Sector	Number of Employees
Hanover County	Government/Education	1000+
Bon Secours	Health Care	1000+
Kings Dominion	Amusement Park	1000+
Tyson Farms	Food Processing	500-999
SuperValu	Food Distributor	500-999
Randolph-Macon College	Private Education	500-999
Walmart	Retail	250-499
Owens & Minor	Corp HQ/Distribution	250-499
Media General	Newspaper Publishers	250-499
QubicaAMF	Corp HQ/Athletics Manufacturing	250-499
Kroger	Retail	250-499
Food Lion	Retail	250-499
Sheltering Arms	Rehabilitation Hospital	250-499
Publix	Retail	250-499

== Communities ==
=== Town ===
- Ashland

=== Census-designated places ===
- Hanover (Hanover Courthouse)
- Mechanicsville

=== Other unincorporated communities ===
- Atlee
- Beaverdam
- Brown Grove
- Doswell
- Elmont
- Montpelier
- Old Church
- Rockville
- Studley

== Notable people ==
- Henry Clay (1777-1852), U.S. Secretary of State, Speaker of the U.S. House of Representatives and U.S. Senator from Kentucky
- Samuel Davies (1723-1761), co-founder, first presbytery in Virginia, who evangelized slaves and influenced the young Patrick Henry
- Thomas Sumter (1734 - 1832), American military officer, planter, and politician
- London Ferrill (1789–1854), African-American antebellum Baptist minister
- Patrick Henry (1736-1799), American statesman and lawyer, noted for his "Give me liberty or give me death!" speech in 1775
- Thomas Hinde (1737-1828), personal physician to Patrick Henry and physician during the American Revolutionary War
- Richard Clough Anderson Sr. (1750-1826), Lt. Col. in American Revolutionary War and land surveyor of Virginia Military District
- Thomas S. Hinde (1785-1846), real estate speculator, Methodist minister, and founder of Mount Carmel, Illinois
- Susan Archer Weiss (1822–1917), poet, author, artist
- Sheri Holman (1966-), award-winning novelist and screenwriter
- Jock Jones (1968-), former NFL player, Cleveland Browns and Arizona Cardinals
- Dolley Madison (1768–1849), First Lady, spent much of her childhood in Hanover County
- Jason Mraz (1977-), Grammy Award-winning singer-songwriter
- Sam Rogers (fullback) (1995-), former NFL player, Buffalo Bills and Los Angeles Rams
- Lucien D. Starke (1826–1902), politician and newspaper publisher
- Damien Woody (1977-), ESPN analyst, former NFL player and two-time Super Bowl champion, Detroit Lions, New England Patriots, and New York Jets
- Josh Wells (1991-), former NFL offensive tackle for the Jacksonville Jaguars, Tampa Bay Buccaneers, and Baltimore Ravens and Super Bowl LV Champion
- JJ Lawhorn (1993-), American country music singer-songwriter

== See also ==
- Hanover County Municipal Airport
- Hanover County Sheriff's Office
- Hanover tomato
- National Register of Historic Places listings in Hanover County, Virginia
