= J. Harwood Cochrane =

American businessman

- Born: James Harwood Cochrane; November 16, 1912; Goochland, Virginia, U.S.
- Died: July 25, 2016 (aged 103); Richmond, Virginia, U.S.
- Occupations: Trucker, businessman, farmer, philanthropist
- Known for: Overnite Transportation

James Harwood Cochrane (November 16, 1912 – July 25, 2016) was an American businessman and philanthropist, as well as inductee into the Automotive Hall of Fame.

== Early and family life ==
Cochrane and his six brothers and sisters grew up in humble circumstances. Their rural Goochland County home lacked both plumbing and central heating. His father died of pneumonia when Harwood was 16 years old, and his mother ran a soup kitchen in Richmond, Virginia.

He met his future wife of eight decades, Louise Odell Blanks, on a blind date (each with another person) and they wed in the parlor of the pastor of Tabernacle Baptist Church in 1934. His mother fixed their wedding dinner, and their honeymoon was a movie at the Loew's theater in downtown Richmond. Harwood and Louise celebrated their 80th anniversary at the same location, although the location had become the Carpenter Theater, and their 1000 guests listened to Steven Smith conduct the Richmond Symphony Women's Chorus, Richmond Ballet and various soloists.

== Career ==
In 1929, the teenaged Cochrane quit Goochland High School and began delivering milk for the Virginia Dairy Company (1912–1978). He long remembered those years of starting work shortly before 2 a.m. He, his brother Calvin and Charlie the Horse were "Cochrane Transportation."

The brothers established separate trucking companies in 1933, splitting up routes. In 1935, despite the Great Depression and having married Louise only about a year earlier, Cochrane quit the part-time dairy delivery job and formed Overnite Transportation. The name's spelling arose because a Baltimore company already was called "Overnight Transportation." Cochrane later told tales of eating frugally on the road, sometimes pawning his watch or other items to buy gasoline to return home, and even for nine months in 1934 driving a truck lacking both brakes and fourth gear.

Overnite Trucking nonetheless grew both internally and by acquiring other trucking companies. It relied on establishing a system of terminals to facilitate short-haul deliveries. The development of the Interstate Highway System helped business, and the Interstate Commerce Commission also began regulating the industry in 1935. Overnite Trucking's stock became publicly traded in 1957 despite a bruising unionization effort by the International Brotherhood of Teamsters. Cochrane later treasured a copy of the $359,000 check written in 1963 by then Teamsters president Jimmy Hoffa to Overnite to settle a legal judgment against the Union.

By 1986, the company which began with a tractor, a trailer, a straight truck and two part-time drivers had become large enough that the Union Pacific Corporation offered to buy it. Though Cochrane initially demurred, he finally sold it for $1.2 billion. Many of his employees, who had received stock, also became wealthy. Cochrane remained as Overnite's CEO until 1991 (at age 79 and when a 5-year non-competition agreement expired). Union Pacific spun Overnite off in 2003, and in 2005 United Parcel Service bought it for $1.25 billion. It became the UPS Freight division, the country's fifth largest less-than-load carrier.

In 1991 Cochrane both was inducted into the Automotive Hall of Fame for building Overnite, as well as having started Highway Express Inc., a full-load trucking company based near Overnite's terminal on the Midlothian Turnpike. He sold Highway Express in 2003 to the Celadon Group and with his wife Louise concentrated on philanthropic activities.

They become major philanthropists of their home town. Rockville, Virginia named its library (part of the Pamunkey Regional Library) after the Cochranes, who also donated $1 million to the American Red Cross to provide relief after Hurricane Katrina. Richmond cultural institutions that they both often visited and donated to included: the Virginia Museum of Fine Arts, Richmond Ballet, Richmond Symphony, Lewis Ginter Botanical Garden and Virginia Opera. They also made donations to their Tabernacle Baptist Church and numerous Baptist causes, including the Baptist Theological Seminary at Richmond (which gave them both honorary degrees in 2012), well-digging efforts in Africa and $8 million to the Southern Baptist International Mission Board (although Cochrane) ended up writing it out of his will, displeased with increasing fundamentalism).

== Death and legacy ==
Cochrane died within a year of his beloved wife of 81 years, Louise. They are survived by their son James Harwood Cochrane Jr. and daughter Judith Cochrane Gilman-Hines, as well as numerous grandchildren and great-grandchildren, one of whom shared a birthday with Louise. Their daughter Suzanne Hope Cochrane Austell Martin died in 2009 and another daughter Treena died as an infant.
