= Union Pacific Rail =

Union Pacific Rail may refer to:

- Union Pacific Corporation, holding company that owns the Union Pacific Railroad
- Union Pacific Railroad
