= Pamunkey Regional Library =

Public library system in Virginia, United States

- Location: US
- Established: 1942
- Branches: 7

Access and use
- Circulation: 900,000
- Population served: 145,664
- Members: 68,000

Other information
- Website: Pamunkey Regional Library

Pamunkey Regional Library serves the counties of Goochland and Hanover, and the town of Ashland, in central Virginia.

== Service area ==
According to the FY 2014 Institute of Museum and Library Services Data Catalog, the Library System has a service area population of 145,664 with no central library and 10 branch libraries. The service area is approximately 1,349 square miles (3,490 km^{2}), and approximately 68,000 are registered patrons of the Library. Average monthly circulation of materials is 75,000, among ten branch libraries and a bookmobile. There is no central or main branch. Administrative offices are located in the Hanover Branch. Technical Services and Mobile Services (the Bookmobile and Delivery) are located at the Atlee Branch.

== History ==
The library system is named after the Pamunkey River, a ninety-mile river that begins twenty miles (32 km) north of Richmond, Virginia, where it joins the North and South Anna rivers. The Pamunkey River goes on to divide Hanover and King William counties. It joins its sister river, the Mattaponi, near West Point, where they create the York River.

The Hanover Branch of the Pamunkey Regional Library opened its doors on October 22, 1942. It was one of eleven libraries donated to rural Virginia counties by Mr. David K. E. Bruce. Mr. Bruce also donated equipment and a book collection. The library was built to resemble 18th-century architecture. The Hanover Branch also houses a Virginiana collection that includes local history and genealogy.

The library system served King and Queen County until 2024 and King William County until 2025, after which library service was provided by each county separately to its residents.

The Pamunkey Regional Library Board of Trustees includes six members: two from Goochland County and four from Hanover County.

== Branches ==
| Name | Address | Image |
|---|---|---|
| Ashland Branch Library | 201 S. Railroad Avenue, Ashland, VA 23005 | |
| Atlee Branch Library | 9212 Rutlandshire Drive, Mechanicsville, VA 23116 | |
| Goochland Branch Library | 3075 River Road West, Goochland, VA 23063 | |
| Hanover Branch Library | 7527 Library Drive, Hanover, VA 23069 | |
| Mechanicsville Branch Library | 7461 Sherwood Crossing Place, Mechanicsville, VA 23111 | |
| Montpelier Branch Library | 15302 Clazemont Road, Montpelier, VA 23192 | |
| Rockville Branch Library | 16600 Pouncey Tract Road, Rockville, VA 23146 | |
