= Atlee High School =

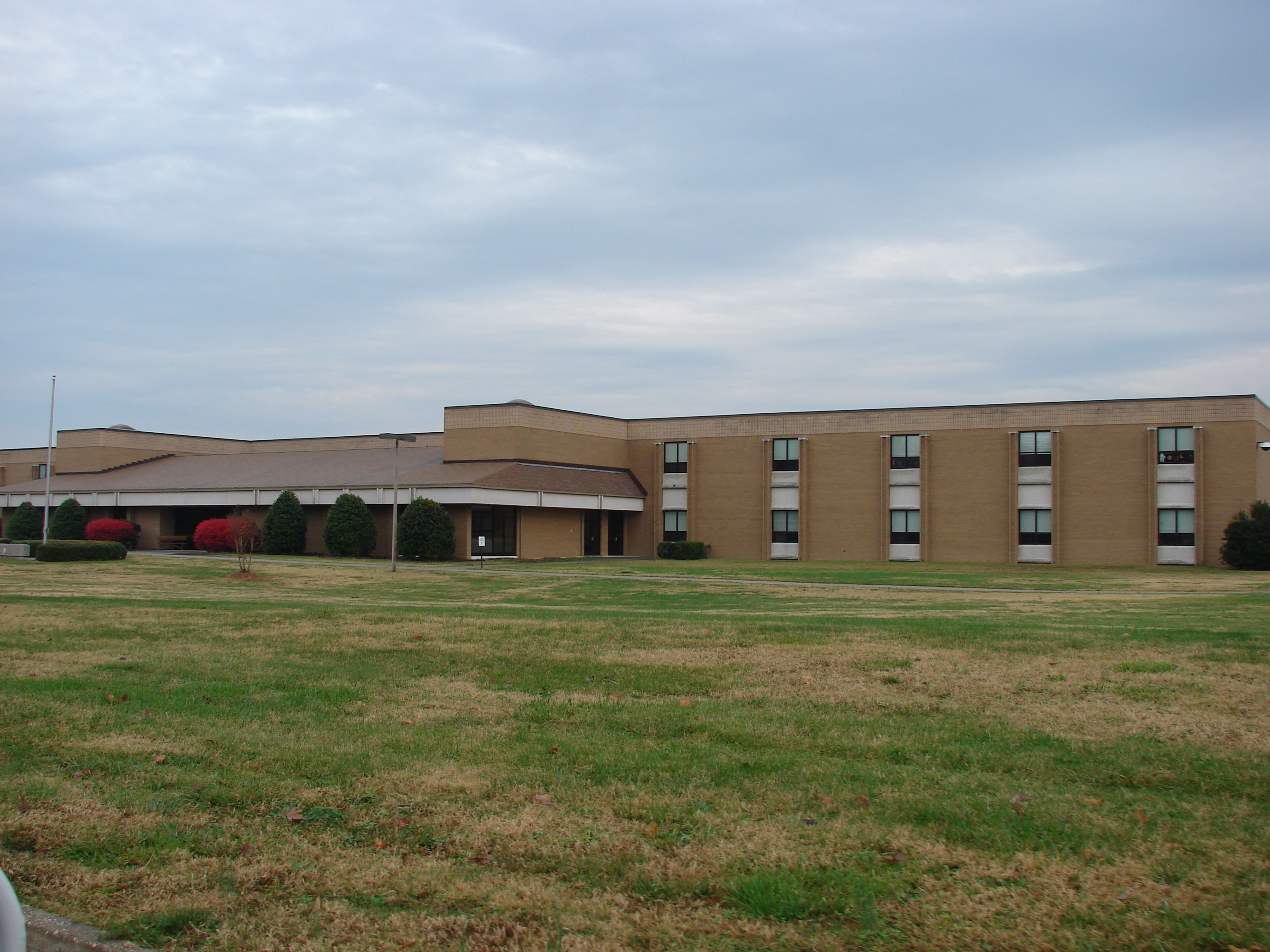

Location
- 9414 Atlee Station Road; Mechanicsville, Virginia 23116; United States; 37°39′54″N 77°24′37″W

Information
- School type: Public, High school
- Motto: "Students today, leaders tomorrow, Raiders forever"
- Founded: 1991
- Locale: Suburban, Large
- School district: Hanover County Public Schools
- NCES District ID: 5101830
- Superintendent: Lisa Pennycuff
- NCES School ID: 510183000114
- Principal: John Wheeler
- Teaching staff: 96.63 (on an FTE basis)
- Grades: 9–12
- Enrollment: 1,470 (2024–25)
- Student to teacher ratio: 15.21
- Colors: Royal blue, black, white, and silver
- Athletics conference: Virginia High School League, Class 4 Region B
- Mascot: Raider
- Rival: Hanover High School, Mechanicsville High School
- Feeder schools: Chickahominy Middle School
- Website: ahs.hcps.us

Atlee High School is a public high school in Mechanicsville, Virginia, United States. Opened in 1991, it is one of four high schools in Hanover County Public Schools and serves central Hanover County. John Wheeler is the principal.

== History ==
Atlee High School opened in the fall of 1991 with a faculty of 75 and an enrollment of 920 students in grades 9 through 12, relieving crowding at Lee-Davis High School as the Mechanicsville area grew. The school became an authorized International Baccalaureate World School in January 2000. By its 33rd year the school enrolled about 1,460 students with a faculty of 166.

== Campus ==
The school is located on Atlee Station Road in the Atlee area of Mechanicsville, adjacent to Chickahominy Middle School, its feeder school. In 2022, the school's patriotic turf design for its homecoming football game won the Sports Field Management Association's national Stars and Stripes contest.

== Academics ==
Atlee offers Advanced Placement courses, dual enrollment through the Advance College Academy, and the International Baccalaureate Diploma Programme. The school is fully accredited by the Virginia Department of Education for the 2025–26 school year. In its 2026–27 rankings, U.S. News & World Report ranked Atlee 29th among Virginia high schools and 1,209th nationally, reporting a 95 percent graduation rate and a 59 percent Advanced Placement participation rate. Of the 383 graduates in the class of 2024, 76 percent enrolled in four-year institutions. In 2021 the school was named a Blue Star School by Working in Support of Education for student performance on its financial literacy certification test, one of 74 schools nationally to receive the designation.

== Athletics ==
The Raiders compete in the Virginia High School League in Class 4, Region B. The school offers the following sports:

- Baseball (boys)
- Basketball (boys, girls)
- Cross country (boys, girls)
- Field hockey (girls)
- Football (boys)
- Lacrosse (boys, girls)
- Soccer (boys, girls)
- Softball (girls)
- Swimming (boys, girls)
- Tennis (boys, girls)
- Volleyball (boys, girls)
- Wrestling (coed)

=== State championships ===
In 2024, Atlee won two VHSL Class 4 state championships on the same day: the baseball team defeated Courtland 12–2 and the boys' lacrosse team defeated Loudoun County 13–6. The boys' volleyball team won the Class 4 state championship in 2025.

== Student activities ==
The school offers the following clubs and organizations:

- 7th Up
- Academic Team
- Archery Club
- Art Guild
- ASTRA Club
- Atlee Kindness Club
- Atlee Ruriteens
- Beta Club
- Book Club
- Chess and Board Game Club
- Club America
- Color Guard
- Computer Science Honor Society
- Dance Team
- DECA
- Ducks Unlimited
- Educators Rising
- Empowerment Club
- Fellowship of Christian Athletes
- FFA
- First Priority Club
- FIRST Robotics
- French Honor Society
- German Club and Honor Society
- Government Club
- History Club
- Human Relations Club
- Interact Club
- International Thespian Society
- Key Club
- Math Team
- Model United Nations
- Morgan's Message
- Music Appreciation Club
- National Honor Society
- National Green School Society
- Peer Assistants
- Skateboarding Club
- SkillsUSA
- SODA
- Spanish Club and Honor Society
- Speak Up Club
- Spectrum
- Student Activity Leadership Team
- Table Tennis and Badminton
- Technology Student Association
- Yearbook
- Young Democrats
- Young Investors Club

The school also has band, chorus, orchestra, and theater programs. In 2022, Atlee students were among five Hanover County students to earn top honors at the DECA International Career Development Conference.

=== Performing arts ===
Atlee has three competitive show choirs: the mixed-gender Illusion and the women's-only Elegance and Serenade. The school also fields a competitive marching band.

== Demographics ==
In the 2024–25 school year, the school enrolled 1,470 students: 354 in grade 9, 366 in grade 10, 389 in grade 11, and 361 in grade 12. The student body was 77.8 percent White, 7.8 percent Black, 5.3 percent multiracial, 4.5 percent Hispanic, and 4.5 percent Asian.

== Notable alumni ==
- Wayne Grubb (class of 1994), former NASCAR driver and crew chief
- Kevin Grubb (class of 1996), NASCAR driver who made 174 starts in the Busch Series
- Zuriel Smith (class of 1998), former Dallas Cowboys wide receiver and return specialist
- Billy Parker (class of 1999), two-time Grey Cup champion with the Montreal Alouettes and college football coach
- Ashley Riefner (class of 2012), professional soccer player for Fortuna Hjørring in Denmark and 2012 Virginia state player of the year
- Connor Overton (class of 2012), former MLB pitcher for the Toronto Blue Jays, Pittsburgh Pirates, and Cincinnati Reds
- Tyler Warren (class of 2020), NFL tight end for the Indianapolis Colts and 14th overall pick in the 2025 NFL draft
