= Hanover High School (Mechanicsville, Virginia) =

Coordinates: 37°41′13″N 77°23′3.5″W

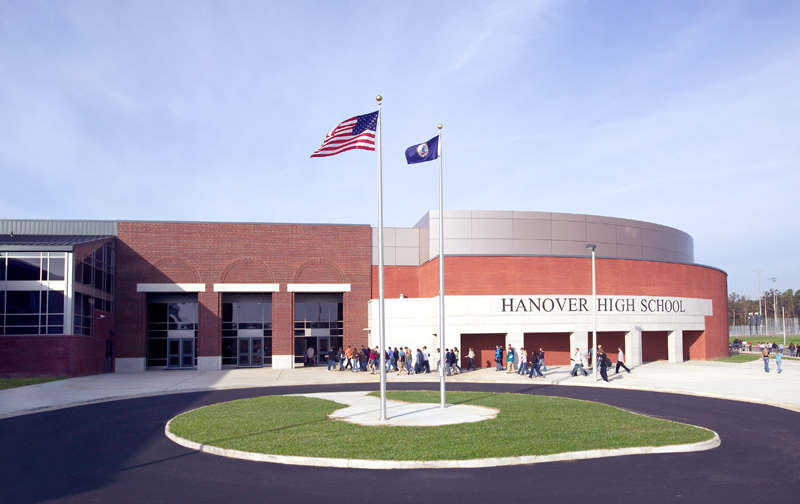

Location
- 10307 Chamberlayne Road; Mechanicsville, Virginia 23116

Information
- School type: Public, High school
- Founded: 2003
- Locale: Suburban, Large
- School district: Hanover County Public Schools
- NCES District ID: 5101830
- Superintendent: Lisa Pennycuff
- NCES School ID: 510183002338
- Principal: Kristina Reece
- Staff: 94.00 (on an FTE basis)
- Grades: 9–12
- Enrollment: 1,349 (2024–25)
- Student to teacher ratio: 14.35
- Colors: Sky blue and forest green
- Athletics conference: Virginia High School League, Class 4 Region B
- Mascot: Hawk
- Rival: Atlee High School, Mechanicsville High School, Patrick Henry High School (Ashland)
- Feeder schools: Oak Knoll Middle School
- Website: hhs.hcps.us

Hanover High School is a public high school in the Mechanicsville census-designated place of unincorporated Hanover County, Virginia, United States. Opened in 2003, it is one of four high schools in Hanover County Public Schools and is an authorized International Baccalaureate World School. Kristina Reece has been principal since 2015.

== History ==
Hanover High School opened in 2003 as the fourth high school in Hanover County Public Schools. Its first principal was Carol Cash, who served from 2003 to 2007. She was succeeded by George Sadler, who served from 2007 until his retirement in 2012. Dana Gresham served as principal from 2012 to 2015. Kristina Reece has been principal since 2015.

== Campus ==
The school is located on Chamberlayne Road (U.S. Route 301) in the Atlee area of Mechanicsville, adjacent to Oak Knoll Middle School, its feeder school.

== Academics ==
Hanover offers Advanced Placement courses, dual enrollment, and the International Baccalaureate Diploma Programme. In 2024–25, 31.8 percent of students were enrolled in at least one Advanced Placement course and 28 percent took an AP exam. The school is fully accredited by the Virginia Department of Education for the 2025–26 school year. Its four-year on-time graduation rate was 97.6 percent for the class of 2025, above the division rate of 95.2 percent and the state rate of 92.9 percent; 70.2 percent of that class earned advanced studies diplomas. In its 2026 rankings, U.S. News & World Report ranked the school 70th among Virginia high schools and 2,959th nationally.

=== Specialty Center ===
The Specialty Center at Hanover High School offers STEM, public safety, and health sciences electives.

STEM electives

- Electronics I, II, and III
- Engineering I and II
- Design, Multimedia, and Web Technologies

Public safety electives

- Firefighting
- Criminal Justice I and II

Health sciences electives

- Emergency Medical Technician
- Patient Care Technician
- Nurse Aide
- Pharmacy Technician I and II
- Sports Medicine I and II

== Athletics ==
The Hawks compete in the Virginia High School League in Class 4, Region B. The school offers the following sports:

- Baseball (boys)
- Basketball (boys, girls)
- Cheerleading (coed)
- Cross country (boys, girls)
- Field hockey (girls)
- Football (boys)
- Golf (boys, girls)
- Gymnastics (coed)
- Lacrosse (boys, girls)
- Soccer (boys, girls)
- Softball (girls)
- Swimming (boys, girls)
- Tennis (boys, girls)
- Track and field (boys, girls)
- Volleyball (girls)
- Wrestling (boys, girls)

=== State championships ===
The baseball team has won five VHSL state championships: Group AAA titles in 2013, 2014, and 2016, and Class 4 titles in 2022 and 2023. The softball team won state championships in 2006 and 2022.

== Student activities ==
The school offers the following clubs and organizations:

- 7th Up
- Academic/Battle of the Brains Team
- Art Guild
- Band
- Beta Club
- Character Education
- Chess Club
- Color Guard
- Debate
- DECA
- Drama Club
- Environmental/Human Rights Club
- Environmental Science Club
- Emerging Leaders
- Film Club
- Forensics
- French Club/Société Honoraire de Français
- FFA
- German Club/German National Honor Society
- Hawk Ambassadors
- Honor Council
- HOSA
- International Thespian Society
- Latin Honor Society
- Key Club
- Math Team
- Model United Nations
- National Honor Society
- National Spanish Honor Society
- Newspaper
- Orchestra
- Psychology Club
- Photography Club
- Robotics Team 1522
- Show choir (Sound FX)
- Sign Language Club
- S.O.S. (Serving Our Soldiers)
- S.O.D.A.
- Spanish Club
- Spirit Club
- Student Council Association
- Tri-M Music Honor Society
- W.E.B.
- Yearbook

== Demographics ==
In the 2024–25 school year, the school enrolled 1,349 students: 347 in grade 9, 359 in grade 10, 308 in grade 11, and 335 in grade 12. Enrollment has declined from 1,427 in 2022–23. The student body was 79.3 percent White, 6.9 percent Black, and 5.6 percent Hispanic, with the remainder Asian, multiracial, or of other backgrounds.

== Notable alumni ==
- Josh Wells (class of 2009), former NFL offensive tackle and Super Bowl LV champion with the Tampa Bay Buccaneers
- Ed Davis, NBA power forward and 13th overall pick in the 2010 NBA draft; attended Hanover for two years before transferring to Benedictine
- Jonathan Wayne "JJ" Lawhorn, country music singer-songwriter
- Andrew Knizner (class of 2013), MLB catcher who led Hanover to the 2013 Virginia Class AAA baseball state championship
- Sam Rogers (class of 2013), former NFL fullback who became Hanover's head football coach in 2020
- Seth Keller (class of 2022), Gatorade Virginia Baseball Player of the Year and sixth-round pick of the Atlanta Braves in the 2022 Major League Baseball draft
