= Rockville, Virginia =

Unincorporated community in Virginia, United States

Coordinates: 37°43′34″N 77°40′42″W

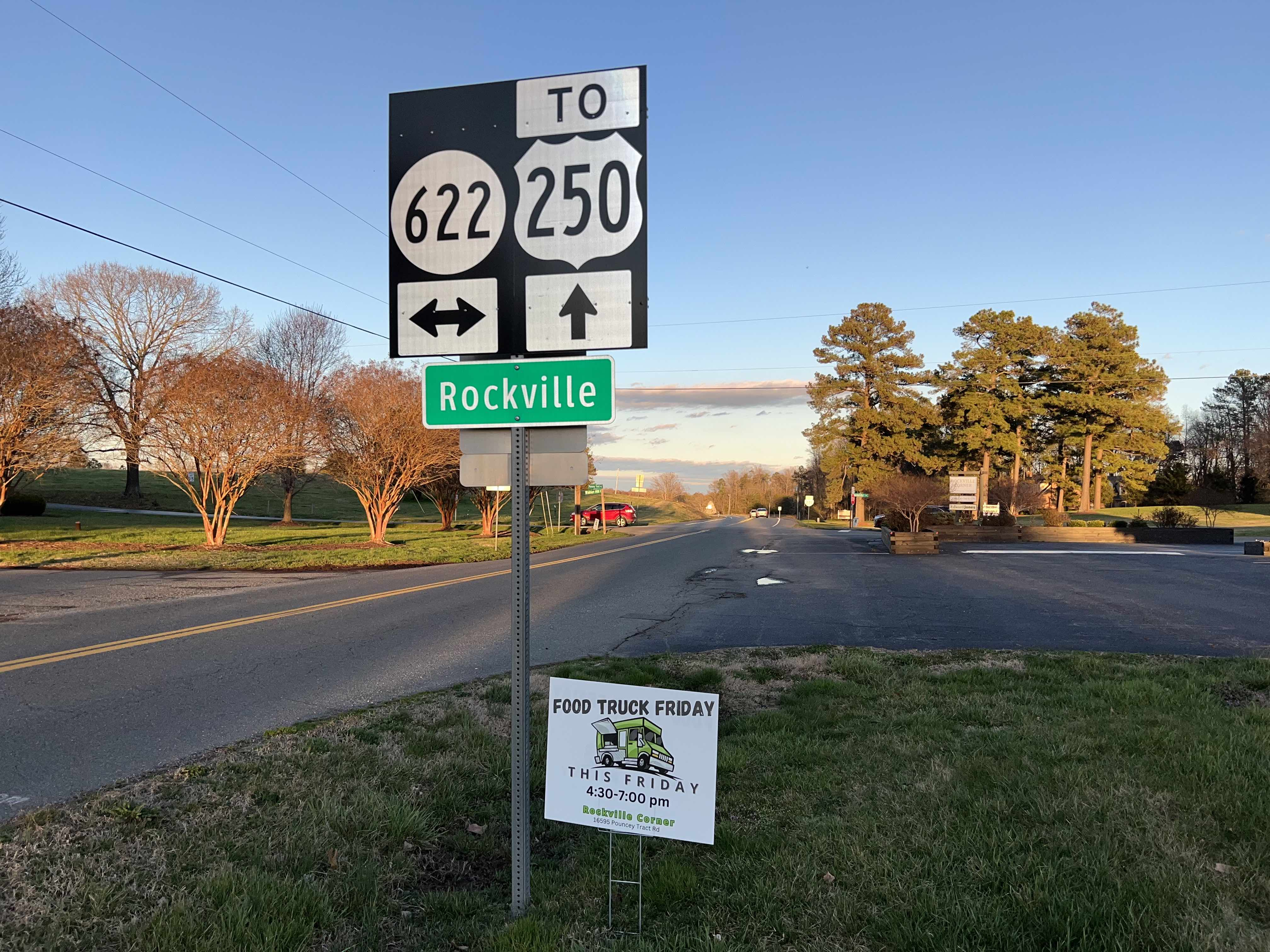
Center of Rockville, Virginia.

Rockville is an unincorporated community in Hanover County in the Central Region of the U.S. state of Virginia. Rockville was named after early 19th century postmaster, William Rock. Prior to the name "Rockville," the community was named "Dentonsville," after postmaster Allen Denton, the descendant of colonial settler Thomas Denton, whose tavern ("Denton's Tavern") exists today as a private residence. When Allen Denton sold the tavern to William Rock, the name of the community also changed to reflect the new postmaster. The community formerly consisted primarily of farmland. Today many Rockville residents commute to jobs in Richmond.

While most of the land in the area is still farmland, some of the land has been developed into subdivisions. One example of this is Carrington Glen, a rural conservation development (meaning 70% of the land remains undeveloped and undisturbed by development) of new homes on an old farm tract. Other large neighborhoods in the area include Shop Creek and Willoughby.

The local library has recently been renovated and has nearly doubled in size due to area resident J. Harwood Cochrane, retired founder of Overnight Transportation. The library has changed its name in his honor from the Rockville Library to the Cochrane Rockville Library. The library is in the Pamunkey Library System.

Rockville has a variety of recreational sports for children. There is a soccer and baseball field area at the Rockville School Park. There is also a gym and an outdoor pool at the Rockville Center(a private club). Rockville has its own soccer, baseball and swim teams. Some of their baseball teams have achieved excellence, including the 2017 Rockville 8U team that won their division, placed second in the state, and third in the region. That same group of players took their division once again in 2018 as nine-year-olds, won the Virginia State Title, finished in second place in the southeast region, and became the first baseball team from Rockville to play in the World Series. In 2019, as 10 year olds, the All-Stars defended the district and state titles, and won the southeast regional tournament, which qualified them to advance to the 2019 World Series.

Rockville has several civic associations (i.e.: the Rockville Ruritans and the West Hanover Garden Club, Friends of the Rockville Library) and is home to the Monastery of the Visitation of Holy Mary and the Southern Baptist Convention's International Learning Center (formerly known as the Missionary Learning Center ).

Rockville is located in the Hanover County Public Schools school district and the children attend South Anna Elementary School Liberty Middle School and Patrick Henry High School.
