= Billy Parker (gridiron football) =

American gridiron football player and coach (born 1981)

No. 17 – Texas Southern Tigers
- Title: Defensive coordinator & defensive backs coach

Personal information
- Born: May 17, 1981 (age 45); Mechanicsville, Virginia, U.S.
- Listed height: 6 ft 2 in (1.88 m)
- Listed weight: 215 lb (98 kg)

Career information
- High school: Mechanicsville (VA) Atlee
- College: William & Mary
- NFL draft: 2004: undrafted

Career history

Playing
- Cleveland Browns (2004)*; New York Dragons (2005); Miami Dolphins (2005)*; Carolina Panthers (2005–2006); New York Dragons (2007–2008); Montreal Alouettes (2009–2016)
- * Offseason or practice squad member only

Coaching
- Richmond Revolution (2010) Assistant secondary coach; Richmond Raiders (2011) Defensive backs coach & special teams coordinator; Montreal Alouettes (2017–2018) Defensive assistant; South Carolina State (2019) Tight ends coach; Tampa Bay Vipers (2020) Analyst; VMI (2020) Running backs coach; VMI (2021-2022) Assistant head coach & cornerbacks coach; William & Mary (2023) Safeties & nickels coach; Texas Southern (2024–present) Defensive coordinator & defensive backs coach

Awards and highlights
- 2× Grey Cup champion (2009, 2010); 2× First-team All-Arena Team (2005, 2008); AFL All-Rookie (2005)
- Stats at CFL.ca (archive)
- Stats at ArenaFan.com

William Parker V (born May 17, 1981) is an American former professional football linebacker. He serves as the defensive coordinator and defensive backs coach at Texas Southern, positions he has held since 2024. He played college football at William & Mary, and played professionally for the Cleveland Browns, Carolina Panthers, New York Dragons and Montreal Alouettes. He was a defensive assistant coach for the Montreal Alouettes of the Canadian Football League (CFL) from 2017 to 2018, and most recently served as an analyst for the Tampa Bay Vipers of the XFL.

== Early life ==
Parker attended Atlee High School where he was a letterman in football, basketball, and track. In football, he was an All-Metro selection.

== College career ==
Parker attended The College of William & Mary, where he graduated with a degree in Sociology.

As a freshman, in 2000, he finished second on the team with eight passes defended. In 2001, he was finished second on the team with 15 passes defended, and recorded 33 tackles. In 2002, he led the conference in passes defended from the beginning of the season to the end. He returned interceptions for touchdowns in back-to-back games and tied the Atlantic 10 record for interception returns for a touchdown in a season. He finished in the nation's top 50 in interceptions per game with 0.45. In his senior season, he recorded 45 tackles, two interceptions and forced one fumble with one recovery.

== Professional career ==
=== National Football League ===
In 2004, Parker attended mini camp with the Cleveland Browns. In 2005, he attended training camp with the Miami Dolphins, then signed to the Carolina Panthers practice squad for a portion of the regular season and the entire post-season. In 2006, he attended training camp with the Panthers, however he was later released.

=== Arena Football League ===
In 2005, Parker made his Arena Football League debut on February 6 against the Dallas Desperados and recorded his first interception and tackle. He finished as the runner-up in both Rookie and Defensive Player of the Year voting. He was named to the All-Rookie and All-Arena teams as a Defensive specialist. He tied the franchise interception record with 10 and finished second on the team in tackles with 90.5. He also recorded two two-interception games on February 11 at the Las Vegas Gladiators and May 15 at and the Tampa Bay Storm.

In 2007, Parker recorded 66.0 total tackles and four interceptions for 39 yards. He also recorded a league-high 28 pass break-ups. He was named Defensive Player of the Game for Weeks 9 and 12.

In 2008, Parker played in all 16 games and finished with 71 tackles, 20 passes defensed, one fumble recovery, and eight interceptions. On September 23, 2008, Parker along with new Dragons advisory board members Kerry Rhodes of the New York Jets and Danny Clark of the New York Giants, unveiled the new logo for the New York Dragons.

=== Canadian Football League ===
Parker signed with the Montreal Alouettes on May 25, 2009. In his first 6 seasons in the Canadian Football League Parker recorded 283 tackles (average of 47.2 tackles per season), 7 special teams tackles, 11 interceptions, and 2 fumble recoveries. Parker was an East division all-star in 2013. He was a member of both the 97th Grey Cup and 98th Grey Cup championship team with the Montreal Alouettes. Parker was set to become a free agent in February 2014, following the 2013 CFL season, however, he was re-signed by the Alouettes to a new 2-year contract.

== Coaching career ==
Parker helped to coach the Hanover Hawks football team during the 2004 season. He was a defensive backs assistant coach for the Richmond Revolution of the Indoor Football League. He was also an assistant coach for the Richmond Raiders of the Southern Indoor Football League. He became a defensive assistant coach for the Montreal Alouettes in 2017.

In 2019, he was hired by the Tampa Bay Vipers of the XFL as an analyst.

== See also ==
- List of Arena Football League and National Football League players
