= Mechanicsville High School =

Public high school in Mechanicsville, Virginia

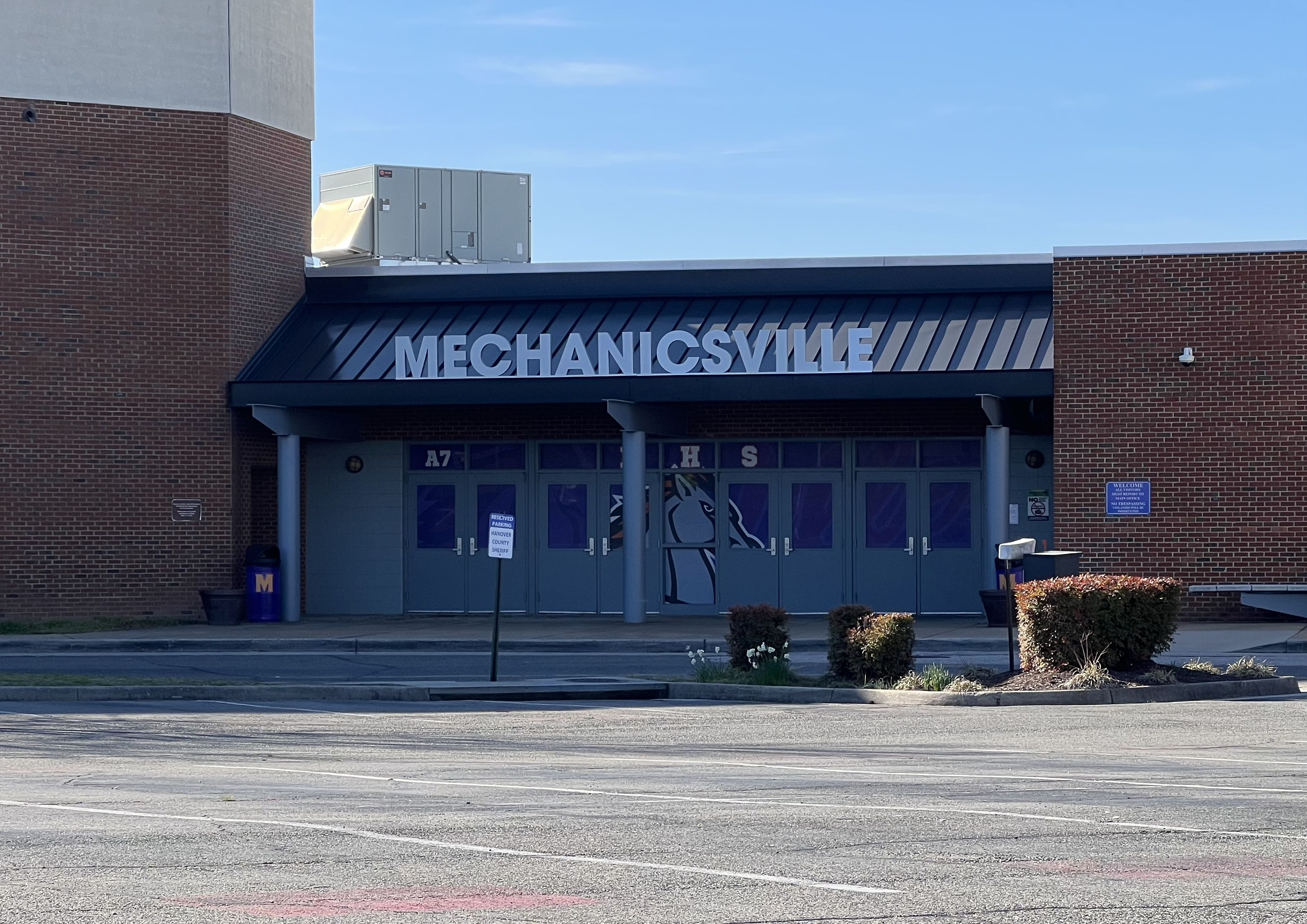

Location
- 7052 Mechanicsville Turnpike; Mechanicsville, (Hanover County), Virginia 23111; 37°36′49.1″N 77°20′25.5″W

Information
- Type: Public high school
- Opened: 1959; 67 years ago
- Locale: Suburban, Large
- School district: Hanover County Public Schools
- NCES District ID: 5101830
- Superintendent: Lisa Pennycuff
- NCES School ID: 510183000772
- Principal: Brandon Petrosky
- Teaching staff: 96.70 (on an FTE basis)
- Grades: 9–12
- Enrollment: 1,245 (2024–25)
- Student to teacher ratio: 12.87
- Colors: Purple; Orange; Additional colors: gray and white
- Athletics conference: Virginia High School League, Class 4 Region B
- Mascot: Mustangs
- Rivals: Patrick Henry Patriots; Atlee Raiders; Hanover Hawks
- Feeder schools: Bell Creek Middle School
- Website: mhs.hcps.us

Mechanicsville High School (formerly Lee-Davis High School) is a public high school in Mechanicsville, Virginia, United States. Opened in 1959, it is one of four high schools in Hanover County Public Schools and serves the eastern portion of Hanover County. The school carried the name Lee-Davis, honoring Confederate figures Robert E. Lee and Jefferson Davis, until 2020, when the Hanover County School Board renamed it after a lengthy controversy. Brandon Petrosky is the principal.

== History ==
Mechanicsville High School opened in 1959 under the name Lee-Davis High School and received students from the consolidation of Battlefield Park and Washington-Henry High Schools. After the new high school opened, both Battlefield Park and Washington-Henry became elementary schools. Lee-Davis opened in the midst of Massive Resistance, as the State of Virginia opposed desegregation of its public schools despite the 1954 Supreme Court ruling in Brown v. Board of Education. After opening as an all-white school, Lee-Davis admitted a small number of Black students in 1963, but did not fully integrate until the 1969–70 school year, after all legal avenues resisting full integration were exhausted.

== Naming controversy ==
Former school logo

Replacement school logo

The Hanover County School Board named the school "in the memory and honor of two prominent members of the Confederacy, Robert E. Lee and Jefferson Davis." The two men were featured in the school's logo.

The school's name and mascot were contested from the time the school was fully integrated in 1969–70. That year, the Hanover chapter of the NAACP appealed to the school board, on behalf of Black athletes, to remove the Confederate moniker from athletic teams because Black athletes did not want to play as "Confederates." After a poll of the Lee-Davis student body found overwhelming approval of the names, the principal decided to keep them.

In fall 2017, shortly after the Unite the Right rally in Charlottesville, a group of alumni, students, and local residents appealed to the School Board to change the name of Lee-Davis and its feeder school, Stonewall Jackson Middle School. Following a survey, the School Board voted in April 2018 to keep the names.

In August 2019, the Hanover County NAACP sued the Hanover County School Board in federal court on constitutional grounds. The suit was dismissed by a federal judge in May 2020. In June 2020, the Hanover County NAACP said that it would appeal the ruling.

After the murder of George Floyd in May 2020, another local movement to change the name arose. On July 14, 2020, the Hanover County School Board voted 4–3 to rename both Lee-Davis and Stonewall Jackson. In October 2020, after considering other names such as Twin Rivers High School, the board approved the name Mechanicsville High School.

== Academics ==
Mechanicsville offers Advanced Placement courses, dual enrollment, and the International Baccalaureate program. The school is fully accredited by the Virginia Department of Education for the 2025–26 school year. In its 2025–26 rankings, U.S. News & World Report ranked the school 144th among Virginia high schools, reporting a 95 percent graduation rate and a 32 percent Advanced Placement participation rate. The school has been recognized as a national Blue Ribbon School.

== Athletics ==
The Mustangs compete in the Virginia High School League in Class 4, Region B. The school offers the following sports:

- Baseball (boys)
- Basketball (boys, girls)
- Cheerleading (sideline and competition; coed)
- Cross country (boys, girls)
- Dance (coed)
- Field hockey (girls)
- Football (boys)
- Golf (coed)
- Gymnastics (coed)
- Lacrosse (boys, girls)
- Soccer (boys, girls)
- Softball (girls)
- Swimming (boys, girls)
- Tennis (boys, girls)
- Track and field (indoor and outdoor; boys, girls)
- Volleyball (boys, girls)
- Wrestling (coed)

=== State championships ===
The baseball team won VHSL Group AAA state championships in 1997 and 2001, and the softball team won the state championship in 2011. The boys' outdoor track and field team won back-to-back Class 5A state championships in 2014 and 2015.

== Student activities ==
The school offers the following clubs and organizations:

- Academic Team
- Beta Club
- Board Game Club
- Career Association
- Chick-fil-A Leader Academy
- Color Guard
- Computer Club
- Culture Club
- Debate
- DECA
- Ducks Unlimited
- Empowerment Club
- Environmental Club
- Esports
- Fashion and Design
- FBLA
- FFA
- Film Club
- First Priority
- Fishing Club
- Forensics
- Interact
- International Thespian Society
- Key Club
- Model United Nations
- Mustang Citizenship Club
- National Art Honor Society
- National Honor Society
- Newspaper
- Penpoint literary magazine
- Pep Club
- Photography
- Ping Pong
- Quill and Scroll
- Robotics
- SADD
- Sign Language
- SkillsUSA
- SODA
- Speak Up Club
- Step Team
- Student Council Association
- Tri-M Music Honor Society
- Ultimate Frisbee
- Varsity Club
- Ville TV
- World Language clubs (French, German, Latin, Spanish)
- Yearbook
- Young Democrats
- Young Republicans

The school also has a NJROTC unit and band, chorus, orchestra, and theater programs.

=== Performing arts ===
Mechanicsville has two competitive show choirs, the mixed-gender Madz and the women's-only New Horizons. Together with Hanover High School, Mechanicsville hosts a choir competition every year.

== Demographics ==
In the 2024–25 school year, the school enrolled 1,246 students: 285 in grade 9, 305 in grade 10, 321 in grade 11, and 334 in grade 12. Enrollment has declined from 1,354 in 2022–23. The student body was 73.4 percent White, 10.8 percent Black, 6.7 percent Hispanic, 6.7 percent multiracial, and 2.3 percent Asian. About 30 percent of students were classified as economically disadvantaged.

== Notable alumni ==
- Jock Jones (class of 1986), NFL linebacker for the Cleveland Browns and Phoenix Cardinals
- Ryan McDougle (class of 1990), Minority Leader of the Senate of Virginia, where he has served since 2006
- Joe Douglas (class of 1994), senior vice president of player personnel for the Philadelphia Eagles and former general manager of the New York Jets
- Gordy Haab (class of 1994), Grammy Award-winning composer for film, television, and video games, including the Star Wars video game franchise
- Latrell Scott (class of 1994), college football coach who served as head coach at the University of Richmond, Virginia State University, and Norfolk State University; currently an assistant coach at the University of Maryland
- Jason Mraz (class of 1995), Grammy Award-winning singer-songwriter
