= Joe Douglas (American football) =

American football executive (born 1976)

Philadelphia Eagles
- Title: Senior vice president of player personnel

Personal information
- Born: July 20, 1976 (age 50); Mechanicsville, Virginia, U.S.

Career information
- Position: Offensive lineman
- College: Richmond (1995-1998)

Career history
- Baltimore Ravens (2000–2014) Scout; Chicago Bears (2015) Director of college scouting; Philadelphia Eagles (2016–2019) Vice president of player personnel; New York Jets (2019–2024) General manager; Philadelphia Eagles (2025–present); Senior personnel director/advisor to the general manager (2025); Senior vice president of player personnel (2026-present)

Awards and highlights
- 3× Super Bowl champion (XXXV, XLVII, LII)
- Executive profile at Pro Football Reference

Joe Douglas (born July 20, 1976) is an American professional football executive who currently serves as the senior vice president of player personnel for the Philadelphia Eagles of the National Football League (NFL). Douglas served as the general manager of the New York Jets of the NFL from 2019 to 2024. Prior his Jets stint, Douglas was a longtime scout with the Baltimore Ravens and senior executive with the Chicago Bears and Eagles.

== Early life ==
Douglas was born on July 20, 1976, in Mechanicsville, Virginia. He attended Lee-Davis High School there, where he was a two-time all-state offensive lineman. In college at the University of Richmond in Richmond, Virginia, Douglas was in the Football Championship Subdivision (FCS) of the NCAA, where he started 45 consecutive games for the Richmond Spiders, and in his senior year was named All-Atlantic 10 selection. Before his senior year at Richmond, he interned for United States Senator Max Cleland. Douglas was a volunteer assistant coach for the Richmond football team after graduation.

== Executive career ==
=== Baltimore Ravens ===
Douglas began his career in the NFL by working in the personnel department on the Baltimore Ravens in 2000 where he worked until 2015.

=== Chicago Bears ===
For the 2015 season, Douglas was director of college scouting for the Chicago Bears.

=== Philadelphia Eagles ===
In 2016, Douglas joined the Philadelphia Eagles to become their vice president of player personnel.

=== New York Jets ===
On June 7, 2019, Douglas signed a six-year contract to become the general manager of the New York Jets. The Jets fired Douglas on November 19, 2024, after a 3–8 start to the season.

=== Philadelphia Eagles (second stint) ===
On May 19, 2025, Douglas was hired by the Philadelphia Eagles in a senior scouting role. On July 21, the Eagles announced that Douglas' official position would be the senior personnel director and advisor to the general manager. In May of 2026, He was promoted to senior vice president of player personnel.

== Personal life ==
Douglas and his wife Shannon married in 2004. Together they have three children: Daughter Addison, son Tommy, and daughter Leighton.

Douglas was an extra in the film The Replacements in 2000.
