= TForce Freight =

American trucking company

TForce Freight, Inc.
- Formerly: Overnite Transportation (1935–2006); UPS Freight (2006–2021)
- Type: Subsidiary
- Industry: Transportation
- Founded: 1935; 91 years ago in Richmond, Virginia
- Founder: J. Harwood Cochrane
- Headquarters: Richmond, Virginia, U.S.
- Area served: United States; Mexico; Canada
- Parent: Independent (1935-1986, 2003-2005) Union Pacific Corporation (1986–2003); UPS (2005–2021); TFI International (2021–present)
- Website: www.tforcefreight.com

TForce Freight, a subsidiary of TFI International, is an American less-than-truckload (LTL) freight carrier based in Richmond, Virginia. The company was founded in 1935 as Overnite Transportation, the name it used until 2006 when it was rebranded UPS Freight by new owner UPS. Its name changed to TForce Freight in 2021 when UPS sold the company to TFI.

== History ==
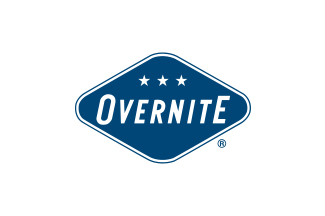
Logo of Overnite Transportation Company

=== Foundation as Overnite Transportation ===
TForce Freight traces its history back to 1935 when J. Harwood Cochrane founded the Overnite Transportation Company. Initially, the Overnite fleet consisted of one tractor, one trailer, and one straight truck. Overnite saw steady growth in its early years fueled in part by contracts with Philip Morris and R. J. Reynolds. During World War II, Overnite provided transportation for the U.S. Marine Corps. The company went public in 1957 and was listed on the New York Stock Exchange in 1962.

Cochrane and Overnite became known for a strong anti-union stance despite a 1959 Teamsters picketing of a number of companies in North Carolina, including Overnite. Over 1,400 employees picketed terminals in Georgia, North Carolina, South Carolina, and Virginia.

The Teamsters later organized a boycott of Overnite's freight by a number of other carriers, prompting the Interstate Commerce Commission (ICC) to grant Overnite temporary authorization to deliver freight outside its own routes. The boycott led Overnite to sue the Teamsters for lost business, eventually winning a $900,000 judgement.

Through the 1960s, 1970s, and 1980s, Overnite grew through the acquisition of smaller carriers or the assets of bankrupt competitors. In 1982, Overnite received authorization to operate in all 48 states of the contiguous US allowing it to grow outside its home market in Virginia. By the mid-1980s, Overnite operated in 33 states plus Washington, D.C. primarily in the Great Lakes, Northeast, and Southeast, but it already had four terminals in California.

=== Union Pacific ownership ===
In 1986, Cochrane sold Overnite to the Union Pacific Corporation (parent company of the Union Pacific Railroad) for $1.2 billion. Cochrane remained with the company as chairman until 1990.

The company had historically focused on LTL services, but following the UP acquisition, it began to haul truckloads as well. Specifically, on an ad hoc basis as part of final mile services for UP loads of auto parts to GM and Ford. This led to Overnite officially starting a truckload “special services” division in 1993.

Overnite expanded west in 2001 with its $80 million purchase of Salt Lake City-based western regional LTL carrier Motor Cargo Industries. This gave Overnite the ability to offer national linehaul services by interlining with Motor Cargo.

In 2003, Union Pacific spun Overnite off via an IPO. By this time, Overnite was a nationwide LTL carrier employing over 14,400 mostly non-union employees and operating more than 6,000 tractors and 21,000 trailers. According to Union Pacific, Overnite was profitable on a revenue of $1.33 billion in 2002, having benefited from the bankruptcy of Consolidated Freightways.

=== Independent operation ===
From 2003 to 2005, Overnite Transportation operated as an independent, publicly traded company again through an initial public offering of $475 million under the ticker symbol OVNT.

=== UPS ownership as UPS Freight ===
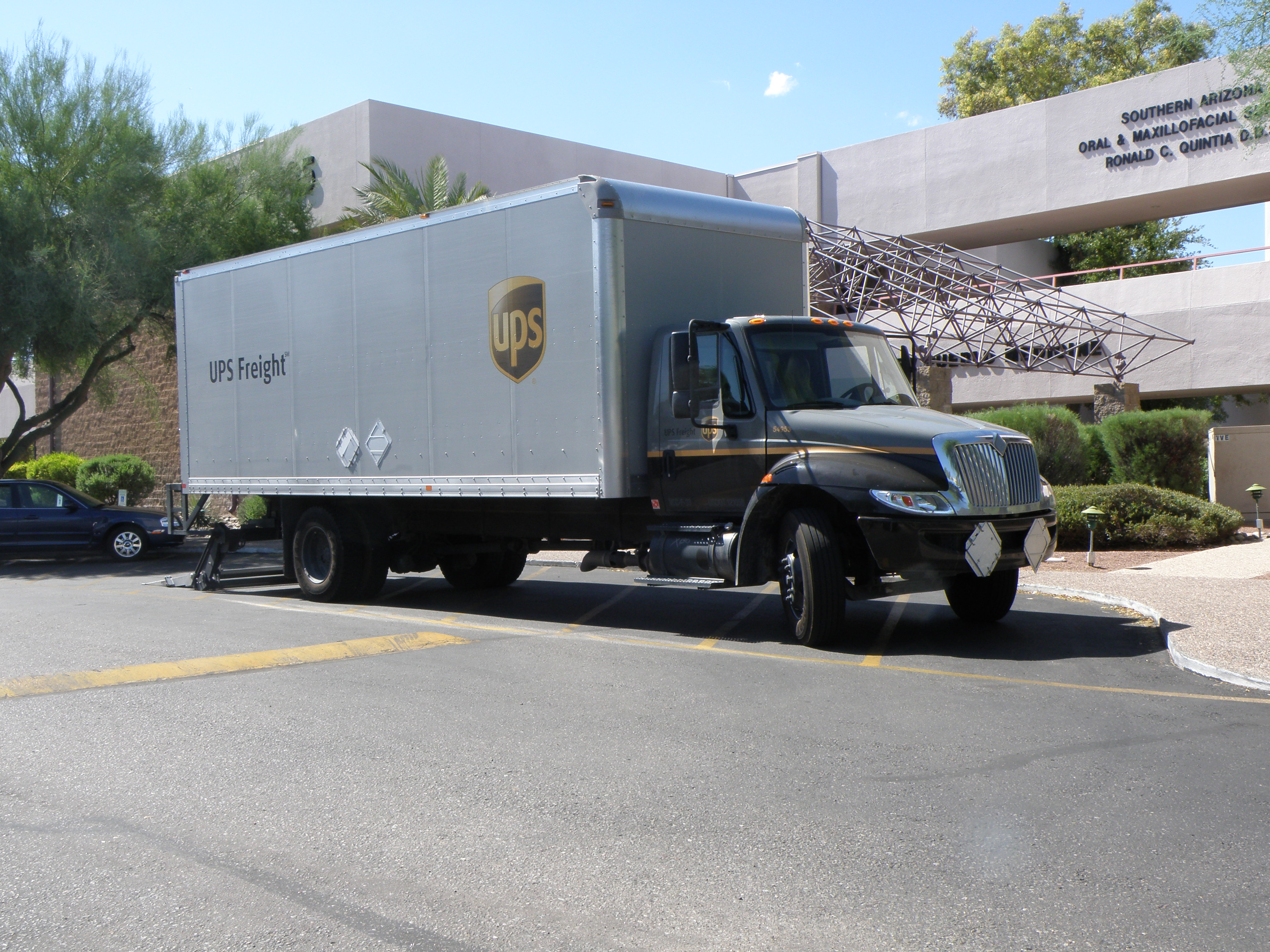
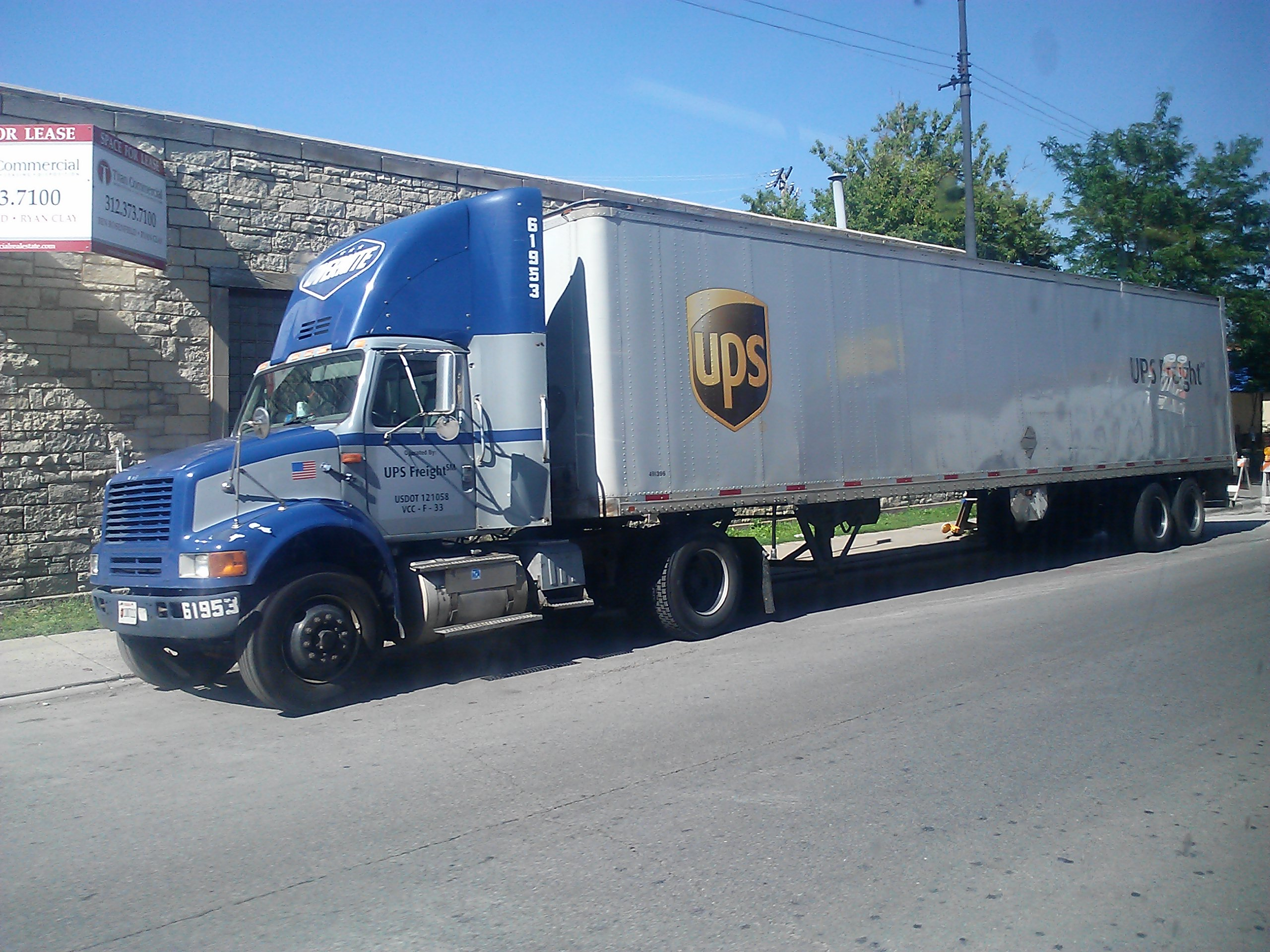
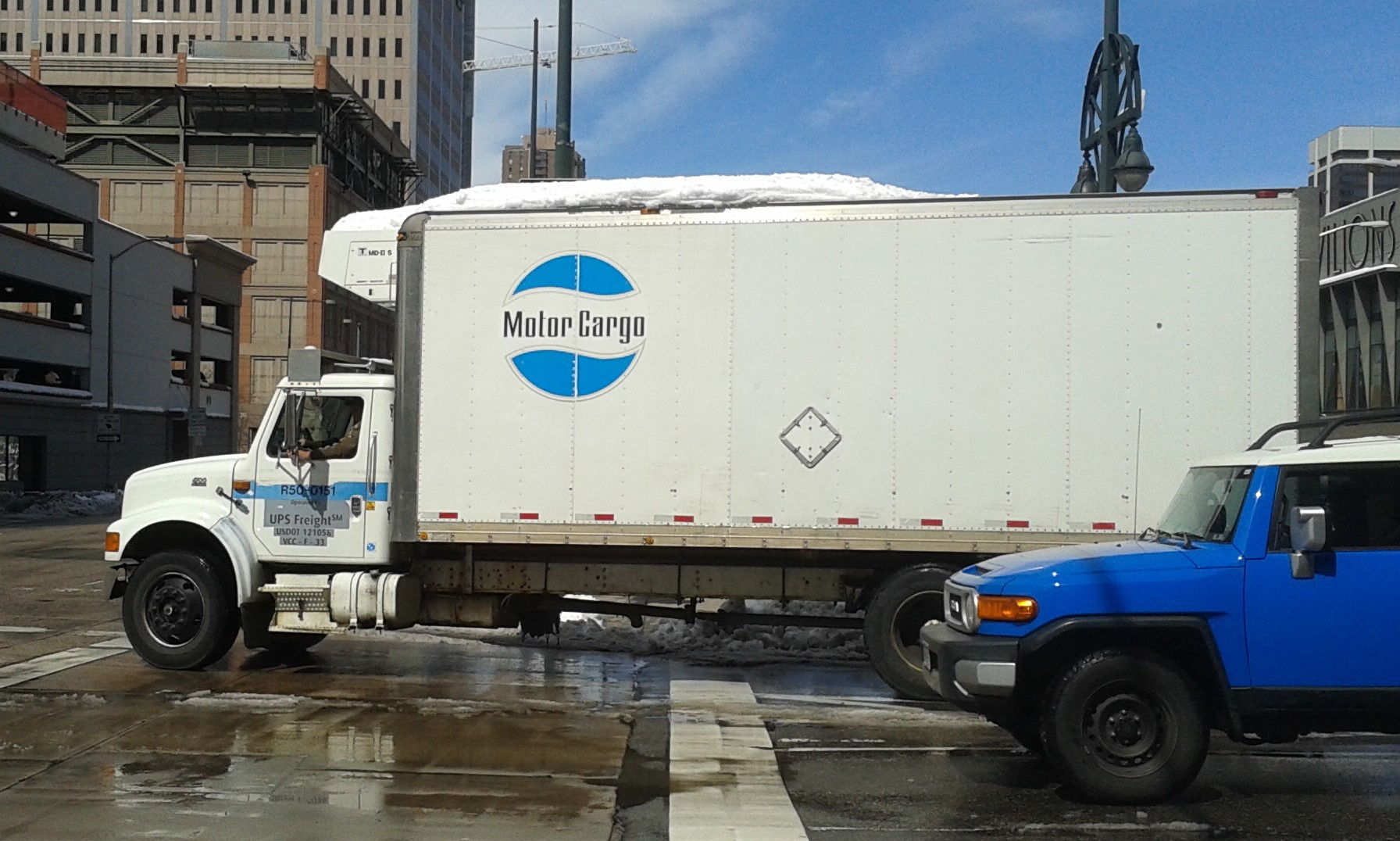
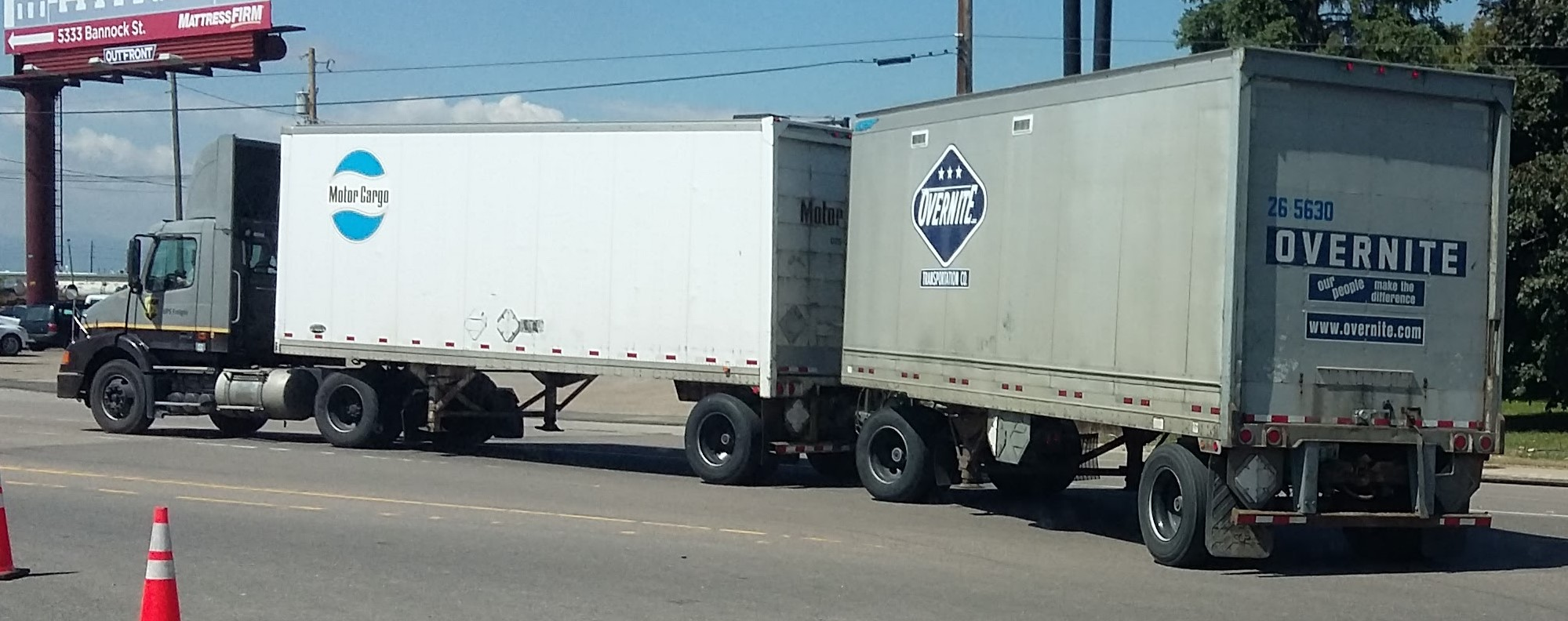
UPS Freight branding proceeded slowly. Clockwise from upper left: Box truck in UPS Freight livery in 2009, tractor in Overnite livery pulling UPS Freight-branded trailer in 2013, UPS Freight truck with Motor Cargo and Overnite trailers in 2016, Motor Cargo branded box truck in 2016.

UPS acquired Overnite and its subsidiary, Motor Cargo, on August 8, 2005 for $1.25 billion. Overnite offered LTL and truckload services nationwide, and Motor Cargo operated regionally in the western US. UPS intended to integrate the two to form a single network with three services: UPS Freight LTL, UPS Freight Truckload, and Specialty Solutions (offering services like trade show, temperature-controlled freight, etc.). On April 28, 2006, Overnite Transportation officially became UPS Ground Freight Inc.

The acquisition of Overnite was partially a way for UPS to remain competitive against its largest rival, FedEx. FedEx had acquired Viking Freight, a west coast LTL carrier, as part of its 1998 purchase of Caliber System and in 2001 acquired American Freightways, an east coast LTL carrier. The two had been combined to create FedEx Freight in a bid to expand into the growing LTL market. This pressured UPS to respond. Immediately after acquisition, the logos on the doors of the Overnite and Motor Cargo tractors were covered with signs showing the operator as UPS Freight.

In March 2006, UPS announced the rebranding of both companies' services to UPS Freight. Starting in April, some drivers started wearing UPS-branded uniforms. UPS began repainting existing tractors and purchasing new vehicles with the UPS trademark Pullman brown on the bottom, a gold line near the center of the tractor, and a gray ("reminiscent of the Overnite gray" according to UPS) for the upper color. At the time, UPS expected the rebranding to take "several years" given the fleet's size, particularly its 22,000 trailers. New tractors for the truckload division (former Overnite Transportation—Special Services Division) were solid white with the UPS shield on the roof fairing.

=== TFI ownership as TForce Freight ===
In January 2021, UPS agreed to sell their freight business to Canadian rival TFI International for $800 million. UPS cited as rationale its plans to move the company's focus away from the domestic trucking market towards small package delivery, which had become more profitable due to the COVID-19 pandemic. The deal was completed in April 2021. Under the purchase agreement, UPS Freight LTL operations would be independent with existing management remaining in place and would be rebranded "TForce Freight". Truckload operations would be merged into TFI's existing truckload group which included Joplin, Missouri-based CFI.

TFI completed the $800 million acquisition on April 30, 2021. About 90 percent of the business, with more than 14,000 employees, began operating independently within TFI's less-than-truckload segment as TForce Freight, while UPS Freight's dedicated truckload assets moved to TFI's truckload segment. In October 2021, TFI announced it would close four former UPS Freight terminals, out of more than 200 facilities it had acquired, as part of efforts to lower costs. Chief executive Alain Bédard said his long-term goal was an operating ratio of 80 percent, matching TFI's Canadian operations; the U.S. unit's ratio that quarter was 90.7 percent.

In July 2023, about 7,800 TForce Freight drivers and clerical workers represented by the Teamsters ratified a five-year national agreement with 81 percent approval; the contract eliminated two-tier wages. In February 2025, Bédard described the fourth quarter of 2024 as "a disaster" for TFI, largely reflecting its U.S. LTL operations, where shipment counts had fallen 6 percent year over year, and said TForce Freight's costs were "still too high".
