= Zuriel Smith =

American football player (born 1980)

No. 87
- Positions: Wide receiver, return specialist

Personal information
- Born: January 15, 1980 (age 46); Richmond, Virginia, U.S.
- Listed height: 6 ft 2 in (1.88 m)
- Listed weight: 196 lb (89 kg)

Career information
- High school: Mechanicsville (VA) Atlee
- College: Hampton
- NFL draft: 2003: 6th round, 187th overall pick

Career history
- Dallas Cowboys (2003); New York Giants (2005)*; New England Patriots (2006); Rhein Fire (2006)
- * Offseason or practice squad member only

Awards and highlights
- PFWA All-Rookie Team (2003); Pro Football Weekly All-Rookie Team (2003); All-American (2002); All-MEAC (2001, 2002)

Career NFL statistics
- Games played: 9
- Receptions: 3
- Receiving yards: 46
- Stats at Pro Football Reference

Zuriel Smith (born January 15, 1980) is an American former professional football player who was a wide receiver and return specialist who played in the National Football League (NFL) for the Dallas Cowboys. He played college football for the Hampton Pirates and was selected by the Cowboys in the sixth round of the 2003 NFL draft.

== Early life ==
Smith attended Atlee High School in Mechanicsville, Virginia, where he practiced football, track and basketball. He began playing football until his junior year. He was a standout in track, receiving All-state honors three times in the long jump, high jump and triple jump.

He accepted a football scholarship from Hampton University. As a redshirt freshman, he appeared in 10 games, registering 31 receptions (tied for the team lead) for 429 yards, 4 touchdowns and a 13-yard average per punt return. The next year, he led the team with 47 receptions for 816 yards (17.4-yard avg.) and 5 touchdowns.

As a junior, he registered 58 receptions (led the team) for 732 yards, 6 touchdowns and a 17.7-yard average per punt return, including 4 touchdown returns. He also tied an NCAA Division I-AA record with 3 punt returns for touchdowns in one game (Hampton vs. Virginia State University, September 22, 2001). In that same game, his teammate Terrance Patrick returned 2 kickoffs for touchdowns.

As a senior, he posted 53 receptions (led the team) for 773 yards (14.6-yard avg.), 6 touchdowns and an 18.5-yard average per punt return, including one touchdown return.

In 2002, he graduated with a BS in biology, leaving as the school's All-time leader in receptions (189) and punt returns yards (1,145). He also had the record for receptions in a season (58) and in a single-game (13 - Hampton vs. South Carolina State University, 2001).

== Professional career ==
=== Dallas Cowboys ===
Smith was selected by the Dallas Cowboys in the sixth round (186th overall) of the 2003 NFL draft, to upgrade the return game of the special teams units.

In his NFL debut playing on Monday Night Football against the New York Giants on September 15, he returned five kickoffs for 120 yards and also returned four punts. But his best play came with 11 seconds left in the game, after he let a Matt Bryant kickoff roll out of bounds, just inches from the end zone. The penalty gave the Cowboys the ball at their own 40 yard-line with no time off the clock, and allowed them to tie the game and eventually win it in overtime (35–32).

In 2003, he led all NFC rookies in punt return average (7.1 yards), earning Pro Football Weekly's All-rookie honors as a return specialist.

Smith was waived on September 5, 2004. After being out of football for a year, he was re-signed on January 13, 2005 and released on August 17.

=== New York Giants ===
On August 18, 2005, he was claimed off waivers by the New York Giants and later cut on August 29.

=== New England Patriots ===
On February 10, 2006, he signed as a free agent with the New England Patriots and was allocated to the Rhein Fire of NFL Europe. He was injured and placed on the NFL Europe reserve list. He was released on February 13, 2007.
