= Andre Curtis =

American football coach (born 1976)

Kansas City Chiefs
- Title: Safeties coach

Personal information
- Born: December 8, 1976 (age 49); Beaverdam, Virginia, U.S.

Career information
- Position: Linebacker
- High school: Patrick Henry (Ashland, Virginia)
- College: VMI (1995–1999)

Career history
- VMI (2000–2003) Linebackers coach; Georgia Southern (2004–2005) Defensive ends coach; New York Giants (2006–2008) Defensive quality control coach; St. Louis Rams (2009–2011) Defensive backs coach; New Orleans Saints (2012–2014) Assistant secondary coach; Seattle Seahawks (2015–2016) Assistant secondary coach/safeties coach; Seattle Seahawks (2017) Defensive backs coach; Seattle Seahawks (2018–2021) Defensive passing game coordinator; Chicago Bears (2022–2024) Safeties coach; Dallas Cowboys (2025) Defensive passing game coordinator; Kansas City Chiefs (2026–present) Safeties coach

Awards and highlights
- Super Bowl champion (XLII)

Andre Jamahl Curtis (born December 8, 1976) is an American football coach who is currently the safeties coach for the Kansas City Chiefs of the National Football League (NFL). He was a former linebacker at Virginia Military Institute.

== Playing career ==
Curtis was a four-year letter winner playing linebacker for the Keydets between 1996 and 1999.

== Coaching career ==
=== College coaching career ===
Curtis began his coaching career at his alma mater coaching his former position, linebackers. He was there for four years and would then go on to coach the 2004 and 2005 seasons at Georgia Southern as their defensive ends coach. During his time coaching at the college level Curtis had internships with the New York Jets and Tampa Bay Buccaneers as a part of the NFL's Bill Walsh Minority Coaching Fellowship.

=== New York Giants ===
Curtis was a defensive quality control coach for the New York Giants from 2006-2008 coaching under Dave Merritt, who he played under at VMI. With the Giants, Curtis won the Super Bowl.

=== St. Louis Rams ===
From 2009 to 2011 Curtis served as the defensive backs/safeties coach for the St. Louis Rams when he went to the team with Steve Spagnuolo.

=== New Orleans Saints ===
Once again following Spagnuolo, Curtis went to New Orleans and became the Saints assistant defensive backs coach.

=== Seattle Seahawks ===
On March 25, 2015, Curtis was hired by the Seahawks organization to be the team's safeties coach. In 2017 he was made the team's defensive backs coach. In 2018 he was promoted to defensive pass game coordinator. He was released by the team after the 2021 season.

=== Chicago Bears ===
On February 10, 2022, it was announced that Curtis was joining the Chicago Bears as their safeties coach.

=== Dallas Cowboys ===
On January 29, 2025, it was announced that Curtis was joining the Dallas Cowboys as their defensive pass coordinator. On January 22, 2026, Curtis was fired by the Cowboys.

=== Kansas City Chiefs ===
On February 18, 2026, the Kansas City Chiefs hired Curtis to serve as the team's safeties coach.
