= Patrick Henry High School (Ashland, Virginia) =

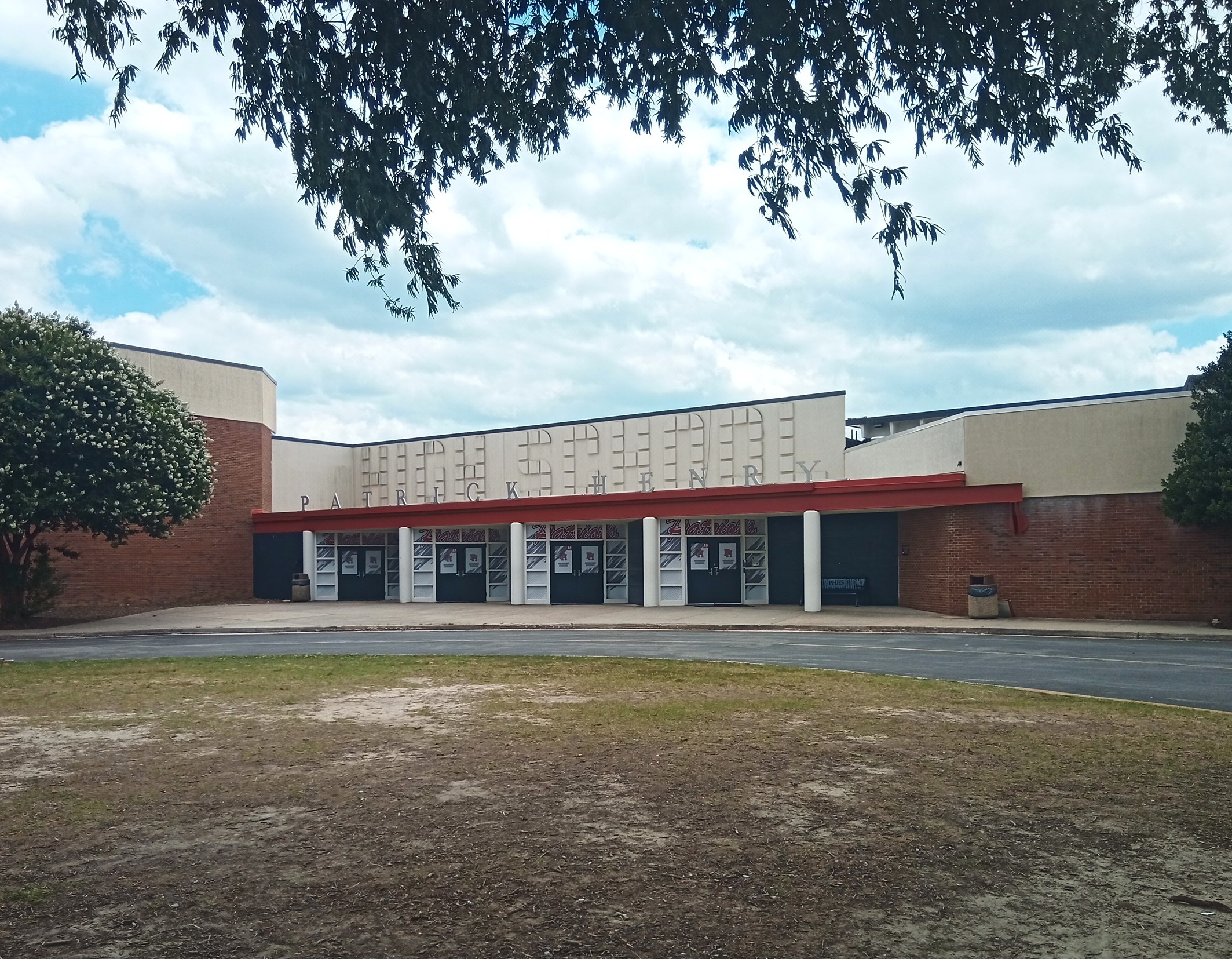

Location
- 12449 West Patrick Henry Road; Ashland, Virginia 23005; 37°47′7.8″N 77°32′2.7″W

Information
- School type: Public, High school
- Founded: 1959
- Locale: Rural, Fringe
- School district: Hanover County Public Schools
- NCES District ID: 5101830
- Superintendent: Lisa Pennycuff
- NCES School ID: 510183000776
- Principal: Chris Martinez
- Teaching staff: 96.51 (on an FTE basis)
- Grades: 9–12
- Enrollment: 1,294 (2024–25)
- Student to teacher ratio: 13.41
- Colors: Red, white, and blue
- Mascot: Patriot
- Rival: Mechanicsville High School
- Feeder schools: Liberty Middle School
- Website: phhs.hcps.us

Patrick Henry High School is a public high school in Ashland, Virginia, United States. Opened in 1959, it is one of four high schools in Hanover County Public Schools and serves the rural western and northern portions of Hanover County. The school is named for Founding Father Patrick Henry, who lived in Hanover County, and its literary publications, The Voice, The Spark, and The Orator, also reference him. Chris Martinez is the principal.

== History ==
Patrick Henry High School was formed in 1959 through the consolidation of Montpelier, Beaverdam, Henry Clay, and Rockville high schools. Its first graduating class was the class of 1960. The school celebrated its 50th anniversary in September 2009.

== Campus ==
The school is located about 15 miles north of Richmond and five miles west of the town of Ashland, near Liberty Middle School.

== Academics ==
Patrick Henry offers Advanced Placement courses, dual enrollment, and the International Baccalaureate program. In 2024–25, 28.4 percent of students were enrolled in at least one Advanced Placement course and 18.3 percent took an AP exam. The school is fully accredited by the Virginia Department of Education for the 2025–26 school year. Its four-year on-time graduation rate for the class of 2025 was 92 percent, and 59 percent of that class earned advanced studies diplomas.

== Athletics ==
The Patriots compete in the Virginia High School League. The school's main rival is Mechanicsville High School. The school offers the following sports:

- Baseball (boys)
- Basketball (boys, girls)
- Cheerleading (coed)
- Cross country (boys, girls)
- Field hockey (girls)
- Football (boys)
- Golf (coed)
- Gymnastics (coed)
- Lacrosse (boys, girls)
- Soccer (boys, girls)
- Softball (girls)
- Swimming (coed)
- Tennis (boys, girls)
- Track and field (indoor and outdoor; boys, girls)
- Volleyball (boys, girls)
- Wrestling (coed)

=== State championships ===
The football team won the 1994 VHSL Group AAA Division 5 state championship, after an undefeated regular season in 1985 and a state semifinal appearance in 1993. The team also won Central Region championships in 1986 and 1993.

The boys' volleyball program won eight consecutive VHSL state titles from 2016 to 2023, the 2016 championship in Class 5 and the rest in Class 4. The eight titles are the most in VHSL boys' volleyball history.

== Student activities ==
As of 2026, the school offers the following clubs and organizations:

- 7th Up
- Anime Club
- Beta Club
- Book Club
- Cheese Club
- Debate
- DECA
- Environmental Club
- FBLA
- FFA
- Hope Squad
- International Thespian Society
- Key Club
- Latin Club
- Model United Nations
- Mu Alpha Theta
- National Honor Society
- PH Ramps
- Photography
- Poetry Society
- Quill and Scroll
- Robotics Club
- Science National Honor Society
- Science Quiz Bowl
- SODA
- Spectrum
- Step Team
- Student Council Association
- Tri-M Music Honor Society
- World Language Club

The school also has a NJROTC unit and band, chorus, orchestra, and theater programs.

== Demographics ==
In the 2024–25 school year, the school enrolled 1,295 students: 336 in grade 9, 302 in grade 10, 319 in grade 11, and 337 in grade 12. The student body was 66.5 percent White, 14.1 percent Hispanic, 12.0 percent Black, 5.8 percent multiracial, and 1.5 percent Asian. About 34 percent of students were classified as economically disadvantaged.

== Notable alumni ==
- Andre Curtis (class of 1995), NFL assistant coach, currently safeties coach for the Kansas City Chiefs
- Erron Kinney (class of 1995), NFL tight end for the Tennessee Titans and member of Patrick Henry's 1994 state championship team
- Damien Woody (class of 1995), NFL offensive lineman, two-time Super Bowl champion with the New England Patriots, and ESPN analyst
- Mickie James (class of 1997), professional wrestler and country music singer
