= Jock Jones =

American football player (born 1968)

No. 55
- Position: Linebacker

Personal information
- Born: March 13, 1968 (age 58); Ashland, Virginia, U.S.
- Listed height: 6 ft 2 in (1.88 m)
- Listed weight: 227 lb (103 kg)

Career information
- High school: Lee-Davis (Mechanicsville, Virginia)
- College: Virginia Tech
- NFL draft: 1990: 8th round, 212th overall pick

Career history
- Cleveland Browns (1990–1991); Phoenix Cardinals (1991–1993); Philadelphia Eagles (1994)*; Baltimore Stallions (1995)
- * Offseason or practice squad member only

Career NFL statistics
- Fumble recoveries: 2
- Interceptions: 1
- Sacks: 1
- Stats at Pro Football Reference

Jock Stacy Jones (born March 13, 1968) is an American former professional football player who was a linebacker in the National Football League (NFL). He played college football for the Virginia Tech Hokies and was selected by the Cleveland Browns in the eighth round of the 1990 NFL draft with the 212th overall pick. He played in the NFL for the Browns from 1990 to 1991 and for the Phoenix Cardinals from 1991 to 1993.
