= Sam Rogers (fullback) =

American football player and coach (born 1995)

No. 39, 36
- Position: Fullback

Personal information
- Born: April 12, 1995 (age 31); Mechanicsville, Virginia, U.S.
- Listed height: 5 ft 11 in (1.80 m)
- Listed weight: 230 lb (104 kg)

Career information
- High school: Hanover (Mechanicsville)
- College: Virginia Tech
- NFL draft: 2017: 6th round, 206th overall pick

Career history
- Los Angeles Rams (2017–2018)*; Buffalo Bills (2018)*
- * Offseason or practice squad member only
- Stats at Pro Football Reference

Sam Rogers (born April 12, 1995) is an American former professional football fullback and coach who is currently the head coach at Hanover High School. He played college football at Virginia Tech, and spent time on the rosters of the Los Angeles Rams and Buffalo Bills.

== Early life ==
In high school, Rogers played a multitude of positions, including quarterback, running back, and wide receiver. He rushed for 1,178 yards and 18 touchdowns and threw for 1,006 yards and six touchdowns as a senior, and caught 5 passes for 90 yards. During that time, he also played basketball and lacrosse.

== College career ==
Rogers played college football at Virginia Tech.

== Professional career ==
=== Los Angeles Rams ===
Rogers was selected by the Los Angeles Rams in the sixth round, 206th overall, in the 2017 NFL draft. He was the third of four Virginia Tech Hokies to be selected that year. He was waived on September 2, 2017, and was signed to the Rams' practice squad the next day. He signed a reserve/future contract with the Rams on January 8, 2018. On May 15, 2018, Rogers was waived by the Rams.

=== Buffalo Bills ===
Rogers signed with the Buffalo Bills on August 15, 2018, but was waived on September 1, 2018.

== Coaching career ==
After his NFL playing career was over, Rogers joined Benedictine College Preparatory as an assistant coach for their football team in 2018. He later joined the coaching staff of his alma mater, Hanover High School, beginning as an assistant in 2019 and becoming the head coach in 2020.
