= Josh Wells =

American football player (born 1991)

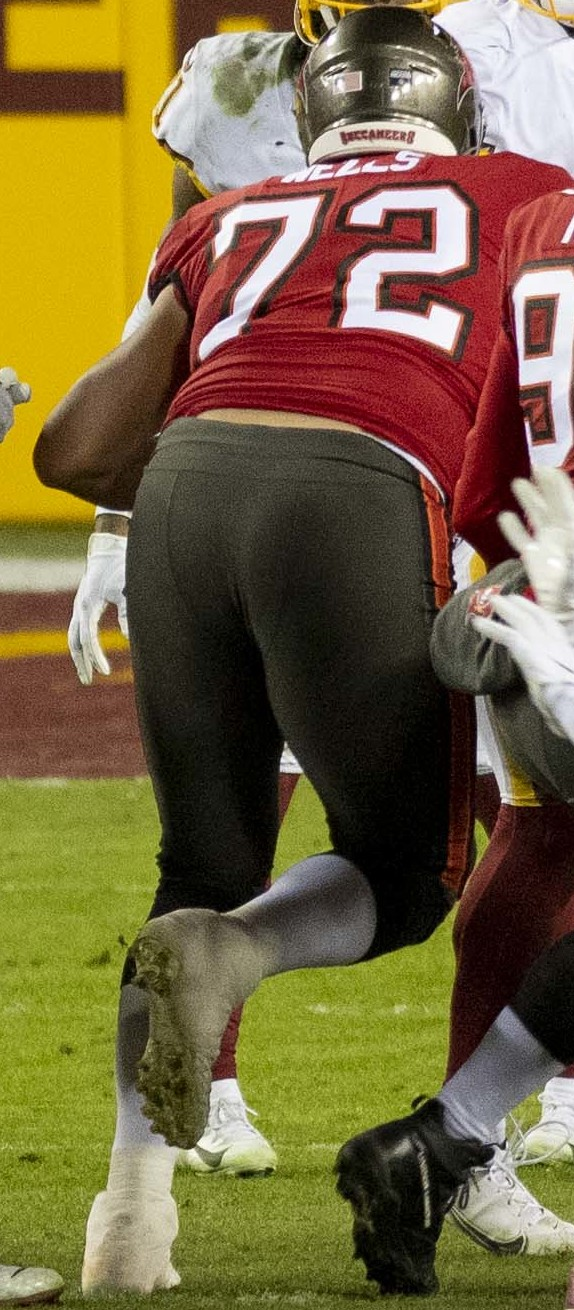
- Wells with the Tampa Bay Buccaneers in 2021

Profile
- Position: Offensive tackle

Personal information
- Born: February 14, 1991 (age 35); Mechanicsville, Virginia, U.S.
- Listed height: 6 ft 6 in (1.98 m)
- Listed weight: 306 lb (139 kg)

Career information
- High school: Hanover (Mechanicsville, Virginia)
- College: James Madison (2009–2013)
- NFL draft: 2014: undrafted

Career history
- Jacksonville Jaguars (2014–2018); Tampa Bay Buccaneers (2019–2022); Jacksonville Jaguars (2023)*; Baltimore Ravens (2023)*
- * Offseason or practice squad member only

Awards and highlights
- Super Bowl champion (LV); 2× Second-team All-CAA (2012, 2013)

Career NFL statistics
- Games played: 95
- Games started: 24
- Stats at Pro Football Reference

Joshua Ryan Wells (born February 14, 1991) is an American professional football offensive tackle. He was signed as an undrafted free agent by the Jacksonville Jaguars after the 2014 NFL draft. He played college football for the James Madison Dukes.

== Professional career ==
=== Jacksonville Jaguars (first stint) ===
Following the 2014 NFL draft, Wells was signed by the Jacksonville Jaguars as an undrafted free agent. He made the team's 53-man roster on August 30, 2014.

On September 4, 2016, Wells was placed on injured reserve with a thumb injury. He was activated off injured reserve to the active roster on November 21, 2016.

On February 17, 2017, Wells re-signed with the Jaguars. He played in 15 games in 2017, starting four at right and left tackle due to injuries.

In 2018, Wells was named the backup left tackle to start the season behind Cam Robinson. He was later named the starter in Week 3 after Robinson suffered a season-ending torn ACL. He started the next three games before suffering a groin injury in Week 5. He was placed on injured reserve on October 12, 2018. He was activated off injured reserve on December 14, 2018. He was placed back on injured reserve on December 28, 2018, with a concussion.

On April 2, 2019, Wells re-signed with the Jaguars. He was released during final roster cuts on August 30, 2019.

=== Tampa Bay Buccaneers ===
On September 10, 2019, Wells was signed by the Tampa Bay Buccaneers. Wells played in 13 games, of which he started two, in the 2019 season.

He was re-signed on May 5, 2020. Wells played in all four games in the Buccaneers' playoff run that resulted in the team winning Super Bowl LV.

Wells re-signed with the Buccaneers again on March 30, 2021. He played in all 17 games as the primary swing tackle.

On March 28, 2022, Wells re-signed with the Buccaneers. He suffered a calf injury in Week 2 and was placed on injured reserve on September 21, 2022. He was activated on October 22. Wells suffered a torn left patellar tendon in Week 16 against the Arizona Cardinals, and was ruled out for the remainder of the year.

=== Jacksonville Jaguars (second stint) ===
On April 4, 2023, Wells signed with the Jaguars. He was placed on injured reserve on August 29, 2023, then released on September 8.

=== Baltimore Ravens ===
On November 14, 2023, Wells was signed on the Baltimore Ravens practice squad. He was not signed to a reserve/future contract after the season and thus became a free agent when his practice squad contract expired.

== Personal life ==
Wells is a Christian. He and Morgan, his wife, have one daughter and two sons.
