= Hanover County Public Schools =

School district in Virginia

Coordinates: 37°46′7.31748″N 77°28′30.65614″W

Address
- 200 Berkley Street Ashland, Virginia, 23005; United States

District information
- Type: Public
- Grades: Pre-K–12
- Superintendent: Dr. Lisa Pennycuff
- Asst. superintendent(s): Mandy Baker (Human Resources); Jennifer Greif (Instructional Leadership); Terry Stone (Business and Operations); Chris Whitley (Community Engagement and Legislative Affairs)
- School board: 7 members
- Chair of the board: Robert J. May
- Schools: 25
- Budget: $230,673,000 (2021–22)
- NCES District ID: 5101830

Students and staff
- Students: 16,820 (2021–22)
- Teachers: 1,247.70
- Student–teacher ratio: 13.48

Other information
- Website: hcps.us

Hanover County Public Schools is a school division headquartered in Ashland, Virginia. It serves approximately 17,000 students across 25 schools in Hanover County, including 14 elementary, four middle, and four high schools, one trade and technology center, one K–12 online school, and one alternative education school.

== Leadership ==
=== School board ===
- Robert J. May, chair (South Anna)
- Steven Ikenberry, vice chair (Cold Harbor)
- Karen Lynne (Ashland)
- Greg Coleman (Beaverdam)
- Bob Seifert (Chickahominy)
- Whitney Welsh (Henry)
- Ryan Martin (Mechanicsville)

== Schools ==
Schools in the Hanover County Public Schools division:

=== Elementary schools ===
Name	Address	Image
Ashland Elementary School	201 Archie Cannon Drive, Ashland, Virginia 23005	
Battlefield Park Elementary School	5501 Mechanicsville Turnpike, Mechanicsville, Virginia 23111	
Beaverdam Elementary School	15485 Beaverdam School Road, Beaverdam, Virginia 23015	
Cold Harbor Elementary School	6740 Cold Harbor Road, Mechanicsville, Virginia 23111	
Cool Spring Elementary School	9964 Honey Meadows Road, Mechanicsville, Virginia 23116	
Elmont Elementary School	12007 Cedar Lane, Ashland, Virginia 23005	
Kersey Creek Elementary School	10004 Learning Lane, Mechanicsville, Virginia 23116	
Laurel Meadow Elementary School	8248 Lee-Davis Road, Mechanicsville, Virginia 23111	
Mechanicsville Elementary School	7425 Mechanicsville Elementary Drive, Mechanicsville, Virginia 23111	
Pearson's Corner Elementary School	8290 New Ashcake Road, Mechanicsville, Virginia 23116	
Pole Green Elementary School	8993 Pole Green Park Lane, Mechanicsville, Virginia 23116	
Rural Point Elementary School	7161 Studley Road, Mechanicsville Virginia 23116	
South Anna Elementary School	13122 Walton's Tavern Road, Montpelier, Virginia 23192	
Washington-Henry Elementary School	9025 Washington Henry Drive, Mechanicsville, Virginia 23116	

=== Middle schools ===
Name	Address	Image
Bell Creek Middle School (formerly Stonewall Jackson Middle School before 2020)	8021 Lee-Davis Road, Mechanicsville, Virginia 23111	
Chickahominy Middle School	9450 Atlee Station Road, Mechanicsville, Virginia 23116	
Liberty Middle School	13496 Liberty School Road, Ashland, Virginia 23005	
Oak Knoll Middle School	10295 Chamberlayne Road, Mechanicsville, Virginia 23116	

=== High schools ===
Name	Address	Image
Atlee High School	9414 Atlee Station Road, Mechanicsville, Virginia 23116	
Hanover High School	10307 Chamberlayne Road, Mechanicsville, Virginia 23116	
Patrick Henry High School	12449 West Patrick Henry Road, Ashland, Virginia 23005	
Mechanicsville High School (formerly Lee-Davis High School before 2020)	7052 Mechanicsville Turnpike, Mechanicsville, Virginia 23111	

=== Alternative schools ===
- The Georgetown School (Mechanicsville)
- The Hanover Center for Trades & Technology (Mechanicsville)
- Hanover County Online School
