= Damien Woody =

American football player (born 1977)

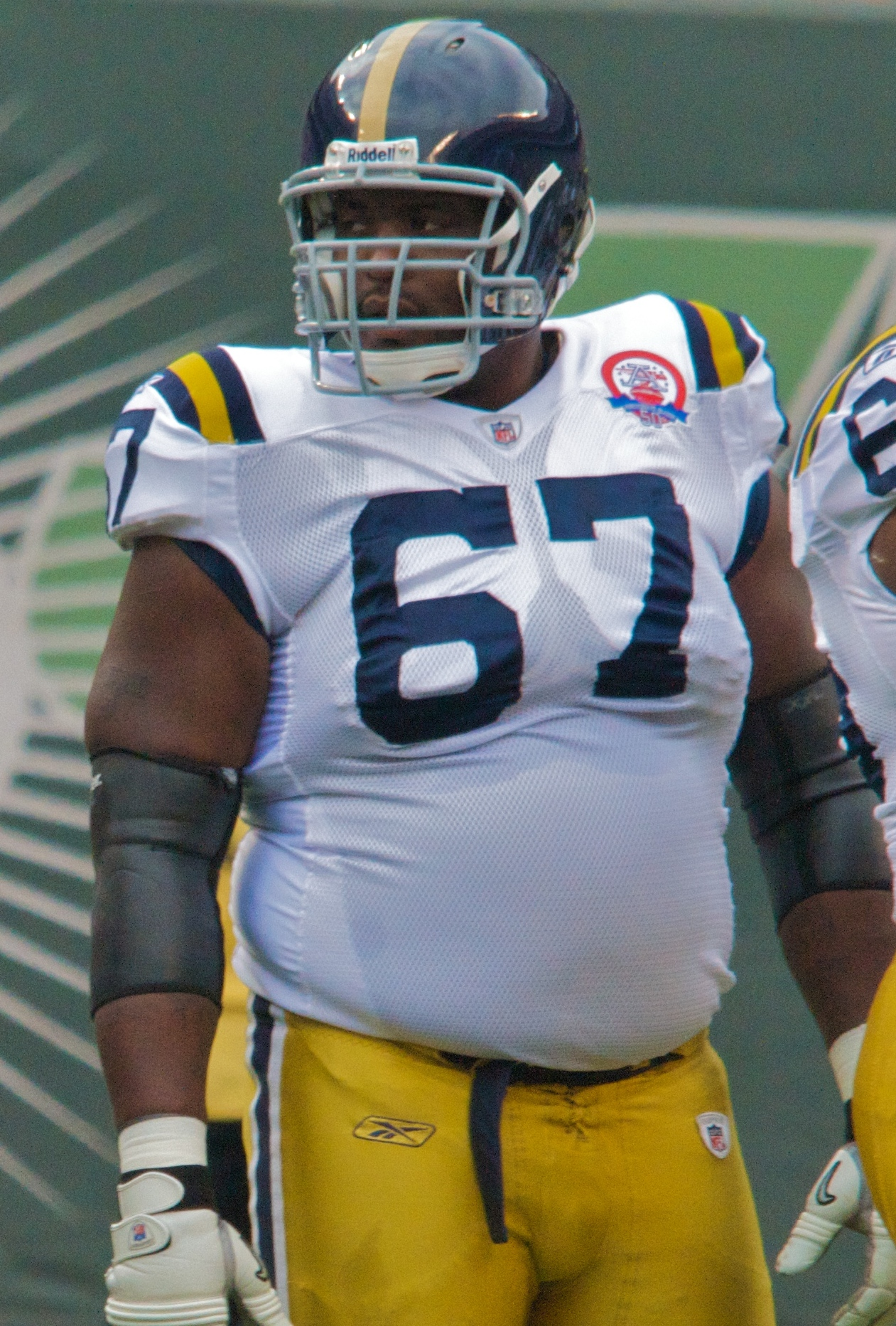
- Woody with the New York Jets in 2009

No. 65, 67
- Position: Offensive guard

Personal information
- Born: November 3, 1977 (age 49); Beaverdam, Virginia, U.S.
- Listed height: 6 ft 3 in (1.91 m)
- Listed weight: 330 lb (150 kg)

Career information
- High school: Patrick Henry (Ashland, Virginia)
- College: Boston College (1995–1998)
- NFL draft: 1999: 1st round, 17th overall pick

Career history
- New England Patriots (1999–2003); Detroit Lions (2004–2007); New York Jets (2008–2010)

Awards and highlights
- 2× Super Bowl champion (XXXVI, XXXVIII); Pro Bowl (2002); NFL All-Rookie Team (1999)

Career NFL statistics
- Games played: 173
- Games started: 166
- Fumble recoveries: 6
- Stats at Pro Football Reference

Damien Michael Woody (born November 3, 1977) is an American former professional football player who was an center and guard and tackles for the New England Patriots, Detroit Lions, and New York Jets of the National Football League (NFL). He played college football for the Boston College Eagles. He was drafted as a center by the Patriots in the first round of the 1999 NFL draft with the 17th overall pick. During his pro career, he played every position on the offensive line. A Pro Bowl selection in 2002, Woody won two Super Bowl rings with the Patriots.

== Early life ==
Woody attended Patrick Henry High School in Ashland, Virginia, where he teamed with Erron Kinney and helped the Patrick Henry Patriots win the 1994 state football championship. He played college football for Boston College in Chestnut Hill, Massachusetts.

== Professional career ==
Pre-draft measurables
| Height | Weight | Arm length | Hand span | 40-yard dash | 10-yard split | 20-yard split | 20-yard shuttle | Three-cone drill | Vertical jump | Broad jump | Bench press |
|---|---|---|---|---|---|---|---|---|---|---|---|
| 6 ft 3 1/8 in (1.91 m) | 328 lb (149 kg) | 33 in (0.84 m) | 9 1/2 in (0.24 m) | 5.15 s | 1.82 s | 3.04 s | 4.99 s | 8.21 s | 28.5 in (0.72 m) | 3 ft 2 in (0.97 m) | 26 reps |
All values from NFL Combine

=== New England Patriots ===
The Patriots selected him 17th overall in the first round of the 1999 NFL draft. Woody would go on to start 76 games with the Patriots, mostly at center.

Woody was known to struggle with delivering the snap in the shotgun formation. When a play was called that required a shotgun snap to the quarterback, Woody would rotate to the guard position.

As an important player in the New England offensive line, Woody was a member of two Super Bowl-winning teams, in 2001 and 2003. He did not play in Super Bowl XXXVIII against the Carolina Panthers because of a knee injury.

=== Detroit Lions ===
Woody signed as a free agent with the Detroit Lions in March 2004 and started every game in the 2004 and 2005 seasons before missing most of 2006 on injured reserve. His play earned him a selection as a Pro Bowl alternate in 2004.

=== New York Jets ===
On March 2, 2008, Woody and the Jets agreed to a five-year, $25 million contract with $11 million in guaranteed money.

During the Jets' post-season run during the 2010 season, Woody suffered a torn Achilles tendon in a Wild Card victory over the Indianapolis Colts on January 8, 2011. Woody was subsequently placed on the injured reserve list on January 12, 2011. Following the injury, Woody was released by the Jets on February 28, 2011.

Woody announced his retirement on July 26, 2011.

=== Broadcasting career ===
On August 5, 2011, Woody joined ESPN as an NFL analyst. He appeared on SportsCenter, NFL Live, Get Up, Fantasy Football Now, and other shows. In 2026, ESPN did not renew Woody's contract.

== Personal life ==
Woody is a Christian. Woody is married to Nicole Woody. They have seven children: Kamille, Jalynn, Alexandra, Domonique, Deuce, Dontrell, and Jacoby.

Woody was a contestant on Season 16 of the reality competition The Biggest Loser, which premiered on September 11, 2014, on NBC under the name The Biggest Loser: Glory Days, appearing along with former NFL quarterback Scott Mitchell.

Woody is a fan of the NHL's New York Islanders. Woody is also a fan of the Los Angeles Lakers.
