= Union Pacific Corporation =

American railroad company

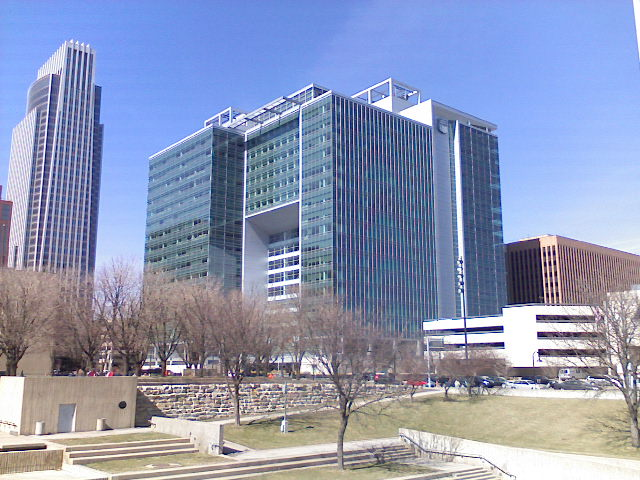
- Headquarters in Omaha, Nebraska
- Type: Public
- Traded as: NYSE: UNP; DJTA component; S&P 100 component; S&P 500 component
- Industry: Transportation
- Founded: 1969; 57 years ago in Utah, United States
- Headquarters: Union Pacific Center, Omaha, Nebraska, United States
- Area served: Western and Mid-Western United States
- Key people: Jim Vena (CEO); Beth Whited (president); Mike McCarthy (chairman)
- Revenue: ▲US$24.5 billion (2025)
- Net income: ▲US$7.14 billion (2025)
- Number of employees: ▲32,439 (2024)
- Subsidiaries: Union Pacific Railroad
- Website: up.com
- Footnotes; Financials as of December 31, 2024. References

The Union Pacific Corporation is an American publicly traded railroad holding company serving as the holding company for the Union Pacific Railroad.

Incorporated in 1969 in Utah, it is headquartered in Omaha, Nebraska along with its Union Pacific Railroad subsidiary. Along with BNSF Railway, owned by Berkshire Hathaway, the companies have a near-duopoly on freight railroad transportation west of the Mississippi River.

Notable companies acquired by Union Pacific and merged into Union Pacific Railroad include Missouri Pacific Railroad which included the Missouri–Kansas–Texas Railroad, the Chicago and North Western Transportation Company, the Western Pacific Railroad, the Denver and Rio Grande Western Railroad, the St. Louis Southwestern Railway, the SPCSL Corporation, and the Southern Pacific Transportation Company.

Union Pacific has announced plans to acquire the Norfolk Southern in a deal worth $85 billion. If approved by regulators, it would create the first transcontinental railroad network in the United States.

== History ==
=== Pre-history ===
On July 1, 1862, after the passage of the Pacific Railway Acts, an entity called Union Pacific Railroad was incorporated. The act was approved by President Abraham Lincoln, and it provided for the construction of railroads from the Missouri River to the Pacific as a war measure for the preservation of the Union. The railroad was constructed westward from Council Bluffs, Iowa to meet the Central Pacific Railroad line, which was constructed eastward from San Francisco Bay. The railroads were united with the "Golden spike" in May 1869. The combined Union Pacific-Central Pacific line became known as the First transcontinental railroad and the train route that operated on it was called the Overland Route.

Union Pacific was entangled in the Crédit Mobilier scandal, a fraud involving the company, which hurriedly constructed the railroad, and Crédit Mobilier of America, which was formed to finance the construction, from 1864 to 1867 and exposed in 1872. The company was significantly overbilled, with executives and financiers, led by Thomas C. Durant, Oakes Ames, and Oliver Ames, embezzling large sums of money. The company faced financial difficulty during the Panic of 1873.

In the 1870s, under the ownership of Jay Gould, the company expanded its rail network noticeably. On January 24, 1880, Union Pacific Railroad was consolidated with Kansas Pacific Railway and Denver Pacific Railway under a new holding company called Union Pacific Railway. Jay Gould controlled all three railroads but, after leveraging the company and paying large dividends, Gould sold a large stake that year.

The Union Pacific Railway declared bankruptcy during the Panic of 1893, in part due to losses from the fraud and new competition, and went into government receivership. In 1898, under a bankruptcy plan sponsored by Kuhn, Loeb & Co., it emerged from the receivership under a new similarly named entity controlled by E. H. Harriman. In 1901, the company acquired a 46% interest in Southern Pacific Railroad; however, the government forced the company to sell the stake in 1913 due to antitrust concerns.

=== 20th century ===
The Union Pacific Corporation was established in 1969 with its incorporation in Utah as a holding company for the Union Pacific Railroad and other subsidiaries. In 1982, Union Pacific Corporation acquired Missouri Pacific Railroad, which included the Missouri–Kansas–Texas Railroad, and the Western Pacific Railroad. The Missouri Pacific Railroad continued operations until January 1, 1997 when it was legally merged into Union Pacific Railroad.

In 1986, the company acquired Overnite Transportation Company (now TForce Freight) for $1.2 billion. At the time, it was the fifth largest trucking company in the United States and represented the expansion of Union Pacific east of the Mississippi River. It also created the first transcontinental transportation system in the United States. However, the companies did not integrate well, exacerbated by issues with labor unions. In 2001, the division acquired Motor Cargo Industries for $580 million. In 2003, Union Pacific completed a corporate spin-off and initial public offering of Overnite. In 2005, the company was acquired by United Parcel Service for $1.3 billion.

Union Pacific completed the corporate spin-off of Union Pacific Resources, its hydrocarbon exploration subsidiary, in 1996. Anadarko Petroleum acquired Union Pacific Resources in 2000 for $4.4 billion in stock. In June 1995, the company acquired the 70% of Chicago and North Western Transportation Company that it did not already own for $1.1 billion. In 1996, Union Pacific Corporation acquired the Southern Pacific Rail Corporation, which included the Southern Pacific Transportation Company, the Denver and Rio Grande Western Railroad, the St. Louis Southwestern Railway and the SPCSL Corporation, for $5.4 billion. It was led by Philip Anschutz. In 1997, the company sold 220 miles of track in northern Wisconsin and Michigan to Wisconsin Central Ltd. for $85 million.

=== 21st century ===
In 2000, due to a slowdown in business activity during the early 2000s recession, the company cut 2,000 jobs. In 2005, James R. Young was named CEO of the company. In 2015, Union Pacific Corporation legally merged the Southern Pacific Rail Corporation into Union Pacific Railroad.

In March 2024 Union Pacific layoffs caused concern at the Federal Railroad Administration to the extent that the FRA, in a letter to UP's CEO, said "safety of railroad operations is paramount ... decisions that comprise that fundamental ... are unacceptable. You must ensure that highly trained and experienced personnel perform critical inspections and repairs .... Your railroad (layoffs) are far outpacing any of your Class 1 peers."

On July 29, 2025, Union Pacific and Norfolk Southern announced an $85 billion agreement to create a transcontinental railroad, subject to review by the Surface Transportation Board (STB). On January 16, 2026, the STB rejected the merger application as incomplete because it did not contain certain information required by the Board’s regulations, and rejected the filing without prejudice to refiling a revised application. The decision did not dismiss the proceeding and directed the applicants to file a letter in the docket by February 17, 2026 indicating if and when they anticipate refiling. Union Pacific and Norfolk Southern submitted an amended application on April 30, 2026 that was accepted by the STB on May 28, 2026, with a request for additional information.

=== Headquarters history ===
The Union Pacific Corporation was headquartered in New York City at the time of its founding in 1969. In 1988, CEO Drew Lewis relocated the corporate headquarters to Bethlehem, Pennsylvania. In 1997, the headquarters was shifted to Dallas, Texas. In 2004, the corporate headquarters was relocated to Omaha to join the Union Pacific Railroad headquarters.

== Finances ==
Year	Revenue in million US$	Net income in million US$	Total Assets in million US$	Price per Share in US$	Employees
2000	10,765	842	30,917	7.56	50,500
2001	10,830	966	31,552	9.80	48,700
2002	11,159	1,341	32,772	11.09	47,300
2003	11,551	1,585	33,496	11.23	46,400
2004	12,215	604	34,596	11.58	48,300
2005	13,578	1,026	35,620	13.17	49,700
2006	15,578	1,606	36,515	17.52	50,700
2007	16,283	1,855	38,033	22.78	50,100
2008	17,970	2,335	39,722	26.95	48,200
2009	14,143	1,890	42,184	22.10	43,500
2010	16,965	2,780	43,088	32.35	42,900
2011	19,557	3,292	45,096	41.68	44,900
2012	20,926	3,943	47,153	51.26	45,900
2013	21,963	4,388	49,731	67.61	46,445
2014	23,988	5,180	52,372	92.50	47,201
2015	21,813	4,772	54,600	92.58	47,457
2016	19,941	4,233	55,718	84.65	42,919
2017	21,240	10,712	57,806	108.51	41,992
2018	22,832	5,966	59,147	138.23	41,967
2019	21,708	5,919	61,673	180.79	37,483
2020	19,533	5,349	62,398	208.22	30,960
2021	21,804	6,523	63,525	251.93	29,905
2022	24,875	6,998	65,449		30,717
2023	24,119	6,379	67,132		31,490
2024	24,250	6,747	67,715		32,439

== See also ==
- Economy of Omaha, Nebraska
