= Key Club =

Student service-leadership organization

Key Club International
- Founded: May 7, 1925
- Type: Service club
- Headquarters: Indianapolis, Indiana, United States
- Origins: Sacramento, California, United States
- Region served: Worldwide
- Method: Community service
- Members: 229,652 (2025)
- International President: Eleanor Koh
- International Vice President: Aayush Tadhani
- International Trustees: Clint Bacon; Malik Bah; Grace Cai; Edwina Jackson; Art Macias; Sara Norman; Andres Salcido; Janvi Singh; Sawyer Sullivan; Isaac Teran; Andy Vo
- Director: Matt Ellis
- Parent organization: Kiwanis International
- Revenue: US$1,782,484 (2019)
- Staff: 120
- Website: www.keyclub.org

Key Club International, also called Key Club, is an international service organization for high school students. Key Club International is the high school branch of the Kiwanis International family, classified as a Service Leadership Program and, more specifically, as a Kiwanis Youth Program. Many Key Clubs are sponsored by a local Kiwanis club.

The organization was started by California State Commissioner of Schools Albert C. Olney and vocational education teacher Frank C. Vincent, who worked together to establish the first Key Club at Sacramento High School in California on May 7, 1925. Female students were first admitted in 1977, ten years before women were admitted to the sponsoring organization, Kiwanis International.

== Background ==
Key Club International is composed of 32 organized districts with an additional district, Western Canada, in formation. Key Club International is currently in 44 countries. As of 2020, Key Club International includes 229,652 members and 4,841 paid clubs.

Key Club International itself employs three full-time staff members and utilizes the services of nearly 120 additional specialists employed by Kiwanis International—all are employed at Kiwanis International headquarters in Indianapolis, Indiana.

== History ==
In 1924, the local Kiwanis Club decided to begin a service club at the Sacramento High School, and the school principal supported the idea and began searching for students willing to start the club. In May 1925, a group of boys at Sacramento High School held their first club meeting.

Female students were first allowed to join in 1977. This occurred ten years before adult women were permitted to join the parent (sponsoring) organization, Kiwanis International.

In 1980, the first women were elected to the Key Club International Board. Lisa Cross and Renee Wetstein were elected as Key Club International Trustees. In addition, the first African American was elected to serve on the International Board. Greg Broussard was elected as Key Club International vice-president. In 1987, Key Club began awarding members with twenty-five, forty, or fifty years of service. In 1996, Craig Melvin was elected as the first African-American president of Key Club International.

The 2019 Key Club International Convention's House of Delegates voted to change all references of gender-specific pronouns (i.e., he/him/his or she/her/hers) to the neutral they/them/their pronoun set throughout all of the organization's bylaws. During the same session, the delegation passed a resolution to change the phrase "...my nation and God..." to "...my nation and world..." in the Key Club Pledge; the Kiwanis Youth Programs Board of Directors, directed by the International Guidebook to review any votes from the House of Delegates, approved the changes.

== Activities ==
The organization maintains partnerships with UNICEF, AYUSA Global Youth Exchange, the March of Dimes, and Children's Miracle Network Telethon. Through the partnership with UNICEF, a major initiative was launched in 1994 to address HIV/AIDS education and prevention in Kenya.

=== Theme of the Major Emphasis ===
At Key Club International's first convention in 1946, the organization began to branch out internationally.

"Children: Their Future, Our Focus" is Key Club International's Major Emphasis theme. Officially, any project conducted by members or clubs that serve needy children locally or globally is considered a project of the Major Emphasis. The three preferred charities of Key Club International are paramount to the organization's success in serving children. These are the U.S. Fund for UNICEF, March of Dimes, and Children's Miracle Network Hospitals.
