= Trinity (disambiguation) =

The Trinity is the Christian doctrine of one God in three persons.

Trinity may also refer to Trinity (nuclear test), a nuclear weapon test in New Mexico, United States. Other uses include:

== Characters ==
- Trinity (comics character), a DC comics supervillain
- Trinity (Team Tejas), an Aztecan superhero
- Trinity (The Matrix), a character in The Matrix franchise
- Team Trinity, a group of Mobile Suit Gundam 00 characters
- Trinity, a character in the films They Call Me Trinity (1970) and Trinity Is Still My Name (1971)
- Trinity, a character in the 2007 novel The Girl Who Kicked the Hornets' Nest by Stieg Larsson
- Sister Trinity, a character in Warrior Nun Areala
- Trinity Collins (née LaFleur), a recurring character in Trailer Park Boys
- The Trinity Killer, a fictional serial killer from the Dexter TV series

== Education ==
- Trinity College (disambiguation)
- Trinity School (disambiguation)
- Trinity University (disambiguation)

== Enterprises ==
- Troitsk Institute of Innovative and Thermonuclear Research, a Russian scientific research center (acronym "TRINITY")
- Trinity Hospice, Blackpool, Lancashire, England
- Trinity Centre, Aberdeen, Scotland
- Trinity Leeds, England
- Trinity Industries, Dallas, Texas

== Film and television ==
- Trinity (2003 film), a 2003 British science fiction film
- Trinity (2016 film), a 2016 American psychological thriller film
- Blade: Trinity, a 2004 action film
- Trinity (American TV series), a 1998 drama series
- Trinity (British TV series), a 2009 drama series
- Trinity (2026 TV series), a British–American thriller series
- "Trinity" (Stargate Atlantis), a 2005 episode of Stargate Atlantis
- "Trinity" (Supergirl), an episode of Supergirl
- Trinity Broadcasting Network
- Trinity and Beyond, a 1995 documentary

== Games ==
- Trinity (role-playing game), a 1997 role-playing game by White Wolf
- Trinity (video game), a 1986 interactive fiction game by Infocom
- Trinity: Souls of Zill O'll, a 2010 video game by Tecmo Koei
- Trinity, a fictional group in Rise of the Tomb Raider and Shadow of the Tomb Raider

== Literature ==
- Trinity (novel), a 1976 novel by Leon Uris
- Trinity (comic book), a 2008–2009 DC weekly series featuring Batman, Superman, and Wonder Woman
- Trinity: A Graphic History of the First Atomic Bomb, a 2012 graphic novel by Jonathan Fetter-Vorm
- Batman/Superman/Wonder Woman: Trinity, a 2003 DC three-issue series
- Trinity, a 2001–02 fantasy trilogy by Fiona McIntosh
- Trinities, a 1994 novel by Nick Tosches

== Music ==
=== Artists ===
- Brian Auger and the Trinity, a 1960s British musical group
- Trinity of Carnatic music, an eighteenth-century group of three composers
- Trinity, a musical group featuring Vivian Campbell
- Trinity (Thai band), a Thai boy band formed in 2019
- The Trinity Band, an English musical group formed in 2004

=== Albums ===
- Trinity (Clea album) (2006)
- Trinity (Tommy Flanagan album) (1976)
- Trinity (Shizuka Kudo album) (1992)
- The Trinity (EP), a 2013 EP by The Lox
- Trinity (Mat Maneri album) (1999)
- Trinity (Joe McPhee album) (1972)
- Trinity (My Dying Bride album) (1995)
- The Trinity (album), a 2005 album by Sean Paul
- Trinity (Prototype album) (2002)
- Trinity (Revolution Renaissance album) (2010)
- Trinity (Past, Present and Future), a 2002 album by Slum Village
- Trinity (Visions of Atlantis album) (2007)
- Trinity, a 2019 album by Eartheater

=== Songs ===
- "Trinity", a 1972 song by Fleetwood Mac from 25 Years – The Chain
- "Trinity", a 2010 song by Paper Tongues

== People ==
- Trinity (given name), a popular name for girls
- Trinity (musician) or Wade Brammer (1954–2021), Jamaican reggae artist
- Trinity (wrestler) or Stephanie Finochio (born 1971), American stuntwoman and professional wrestler
- Trinity Baptiste (born 1998), American basketball player
- Trinity Benson (born 1997), American football player
- Trinity Rodman (born 2002), American soccer player
- Naomi (wrestler), (Trinity Fatu, born 1987), previously known under the ring name Trinity

== Places ==
=== Canada ===
- Trinity (electoral district) (1935–1988), Ontario
- Trinity, Bonavista Bay, Newfoundland and Labrador
- Trinity, Newfoundland and Labrador
- Trinity Bay (Newfoundland and Labrador), a bay
- Trinity–Bellwoods, Toronto
- Trinity—Conception (1949–1968), a federal electoral district in Newfoundland and Labrador
- Trinity Islands, Nunavut, one of the Baffin Island offshore island groups
- Mount Trinity or Three Sisters, British Columbia

=== United Kingdom ===
- Trinity, Angus
- Trinity, Edinburgh, Scotland
- Trinity (Merton ward), a former electoral ward of Merton London Borough Council that existed from 1978 to 2022
- Trinity (Wandsworth ward), an electoral ward of Wandsworth London Borough Council that existed since 2022
- Trinity Gask, a parish in West Perthshire, Scotland

=== United States ===
- Trinity, Alabama
- Trinity, Florida
- Trinity, Kentucky
- Trinity (Rosedale, Louisiana), a National Register of Historic Places listing in Iberville Parish, Louisiana
- Trinity, Mississippi
- Trinity, North Carolina
- Trinity, Texas
- Trinity, Virginia
- Trinity Alps, a mountain range in California
- Trinity County, California
  - Trinity Center, California, a census-designated place in the county
  - Trinity Lake, formed by the Trinity Dam
  - Trinity Lakes AVA, a California wine region in Trinity County
  - Trinity Village, California, a census-designated place in the county
- Trinity County, Texas
- Trinity Islands, Alaska, including Tugidak Island
- Trinity Mountain (Idaho), Boise National Forest, Idaho
- Trinity River (California)
- Trinity River (Texas)

=== Other places ===
- Trinity Peninsula, Antarctica
  - Trinity, Argentina, location of Esperanza base, a permanent Antarctic research station
- Trinity, Jersey
- Trinity, Saint Kitts and Nevis

== Religion ==
- Ayyavazhi Trinity, the incarnation of God in Ayyavazhi theology
- Hindu Trinity or Trimurti
- Trika Shaivism, or Kashmir Shaivism, a Hindu Shakta-Shaiva tradition centered on a trinity (trika) of three goddesses
- Trinity Sunday, in Christian liturgical calendars
- Three Pure Ones, in Taoism

== Sport ==
- Gainsborough Trinity F.C., an English football club
- Trinity Racing A British continental cycling team
- Wakefield Trinity, an English rugby club

== Technology ==
- AMD Trinity, a codename for the first iteration of the 'Piledriver' generation AMD Accelerated processing units
- HTC P3600, a PDA phone, codenamed Trinity
- Korg Trinity, a 1995 music workstation released by Korg
- Trinity (desktop environment), a fork of KDE 3, a desktop environment for Linux
- Trinity Rescue Kit, a live Linux distribution for recovery and repair of Windows, based on Mandriva Linux, 2005

see History of personal computers § 1977 and the emergence of the "Trinity"

== Visual arts ==
- Trinity (Andrei Rublev), a 1425 painting
- Trinity, a seventeenth-century painting by Bartolomé Esteban Murillo

== Other uses ==
- Trinity (supercomputer), a computer at Los Alamos National Laboratory, Los Alamos, New Mexico, US
- Trinity House, a lighthouse authority board
- Trinity house (Philadelphia), a type of small townhouse principally found in Philadelphia, Pennsylvania
- Trinity House Pilot Station, a port tower in Folkestone Harbour
- Trinity metro station, a metro station in Bangalore, India
- Trinity term
- Trinity Tower, a skyscraper in Jakarta, Indonesia
- Trinity Towers, Washington, D.C.
- Trinity Building, part of the Wall Street Historic District in New York City, New York, US
- Trinity Peak, a mountain in Pakistan
- ADE classification § Trinities, a connection between mathematical fields suggested by Vladimir Arnold

== See also ==
- Holy Trinity (disambiguation)
- Operation Trinity (disambiguation)
- Santísima Trinidad (disambiguation) ('Holy Trinity' in Spanish)
- Trilogy (disambiguation)
- Trinitaria (disambiguation)
- Trinity Bridge (disambiguation)
- Trinity Church (disambiguation)
- Trinity (comics), a list of comics
- Trinity Court, Gray’s Inn Road
- Trinity Foundation (disambiguation)
- Trio (disambiguation)
- Triple deity, a theme commonly found in human history
- Unholy Trinity (disambiguation)
