= Trinidad (disambiguation) =

Trinidad is the principal island of Trinidad and Tobago.

Trinidad may also refer to:

== Geography ==
=== Mexico ===
- La Trinidad Vista Hermosa, Oaxaca, a municipality and town
- Trinidad Zaachila, Oaxaca, a municipality and town

=== Philippines ===
- La Trinidad, Benguet, Philippines
- Trinidad, Bohol, Philippines

=== United States ===
- Trinidad, California, a city
- Trinidad, Colorado, a city
- Trinidad, Texas, a city
- Trinidad, Washington, D.C., a neighborhood of Washington, D.C.
- Trinidad, Washington, a ghost town

=== Elsewhere ===
- Trinity Island, Antarctica
- Trinidad, Bolivia, capital of the Beni department
- Trindade and Martim Vaz, an island of Brazil shown on some atlases as Trinidad
- Trinidad, Casanare, Colombia
- Trinidad, Colombia, in Guaviare Department, also known as Barranquilla
- Trinidad, Cuba, a city in Sancti Spíritus province, central Cuba
- Trinidad, Paraguay
- Doña Remedios Trinidad, Bulacan, Philippines
- Trinidad, Uruguay

== People ==
=== Given name ===
- Trinidad (given name), the history of the name

=== Surname ===
- Diego Capel, a Spanish footballer
- Félix Trinidad, a Puerto Rican boxer
- Josie Trinidad, American storyboard artist
- Stanley Trinidad, fictional character
- Telesforo Trinidad, Filipino Medal of Honor recipient
- Thea Trinidad, American professional wrestler

== Entertainment ==
- Trinidad (2008 film), a documentary
- Trinidad (2026 film), a Spanish Western adventure film
- "Trinidad" (song), a song by American rock band Geese
- "Trinidad", a song by Edguy on Rocket Ride
- Trinidad, a fictional character in Battle Angel Alita: Last Order
- Trinidad!, the first word of the Geographical Fugue by Ernst Toch

== Transportation ==
- The Trinidad (ship), the flagship of Magellan's voyage
- HMS Trinidad, three ships of the Royal Navy
- The Socata TB-20 Trinidad, a single-engine aircraft
- Trinidad station (disambiguation), stations of the name
- 45634 Trinidad, a British LMS Jubilee Class locomotive

== Other uses ==
- Trinidad Energy Services, an oil and gas services company and trust
- Trinidad (cigar brand), a Cuban cigar brand named after Trinidad, Cuba

== See also ==
- Santísima Trinidad (disambiguation)
- Trindade (disambiguation)
- Trinity (disambiguation)
