= 2022 Detroit Lions season =

93rd season in franchise history

- Owner: Sheila Ford Hamp
- General manager: Brad Holmes
- Head coach: Dan Campbell
- Home stadium: Ford Field

Results
- Record: 9–8
- Division place: 2nd NFC North
- Playoffs: Did not qualify
- All-Pros: PR Kalif Raymond (2nd team)
- Pro Bowlers: 4: WR Amon-Ra St. Brown; T Penei Sewell; C Frank Ragnow; QB Jared Goff

Uniform
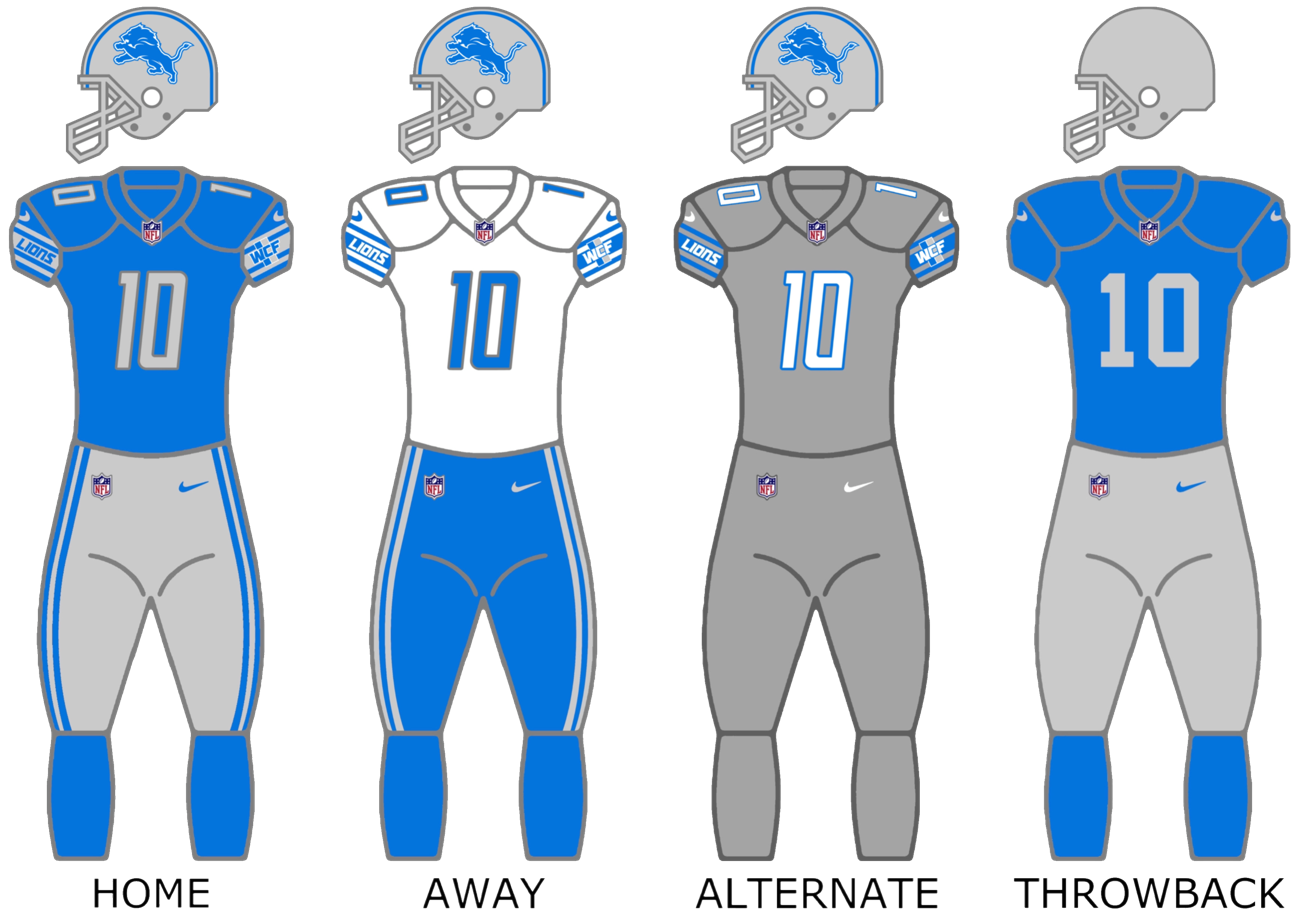

The 2022 season was the Detroit Lions' 93rd in the National Football League (NFL), the 21st playing their home games at Ford Field and their second under the head coach/general manager tandem of Dan Campbell and Brad Holmes.

On March 28, NFL Films and HBO announced that the Lions would be featured in the newest season of Hard Knocks, a show that follows NFL teams through training camp.

After a 1–6 start, the Lions had a mid-season turnaround, winning eight of their next ten games. The Lions finished the season 9–8, improving upon their 3–13–1 record from the previous season. This marked their first winning record since 2017. The Lions won five out of six divisional games, splitting their season series with the Minnesota Vikings.

Prior to taking the field in Week 18 against the Green Bay Packers, the Lions were eliminated from playoff contention for the sixth consecutive season after the Seattle Seahawks defeated the Los Angeles Rams. Despite beating the Packers and having the same 9–8 record as the Seahawks, they lost the playoff spot based on the teams' Week 4 head-to-head meeting, won by the Seahawks. Nevertheless, their win simultaneously eliminated their NFC North rival from playoff contention and allowed the Seahawks to claim the final NFC wild card berth.

This was the last season that the Lions missed the playoffs until 2025 which they placed last in the division with a winning record like this.

== Player movements ==
=== Free agents ===
Position	Player	Free agency tag	Date signed	2022 team	Source
LB	Alex Anzalone	UFA	March 14	Detroit Lions	
QB	David Blough	RFA	March 22	Detroit Lions	
C	Evan Brown	UFA	March 15	Detroit Lions	
QB	Tim Boyle	UFA	March 22	Detroit Lions	
FB	Jason Cabinda	UFA	February 17	Detroit Lions	
OT	Tyrell Crosby	UFA			
S	Jalen Elliott	ERFA	March 14	Detroit Lions	
LB	Shaun Dion Hamilton	UFA	March 14	Detroit Lions	
DE	Charles Harris	UFA	March 15	Detroit Lions	
DT	Joel Heath	UFA			
WR	KhaDarel Hodge	UFA	March 25	Atlanta Falcons	
OT	Will Holden	RFA		New York Giants	
S	Dean Marlowe	UFA	March 31	Atlanta Falcons	
S	C. J. Moore	UFA	March 14	Detroit Lions	
WR	Kalif Raymond	UFA	March 18	Detroit Lions	
LB	Jalen Reeves-Maybin	UFA	March 23	Houston Texans	
WR	Josh Reynolds	UFA	March 9	Detroit Lions	
S	Tracy Walker	UFA	March 15	Detroit Lions	
DT	Nick Williams	UFA		New York Giants	
LB	Josh Woods	UFA	February 22	Detroit Lions	

=== Additions ===
Position	Player	Previous team	Date	Source
LB	Chris Board	Baltimore Ravens	March 23	
WR	D. J. Chark	Jacksonville Jaguars	March 17	
CB	Mike Hughes	Kansas City Chiefs	March 23	
LB	Jarrad Davis	New York Jets	March 25	
TE	Garrett Griffin	New Orleans Saints	March 28	
S	DeShon Elliott	Baltimore Ravens	April 14	
RB	Justin Jackson	Los Angeles Chargers	August 1	

=== Subtractions ===
Position	Player	2022 team	Release date	Source
OLB	Trey Flowers	Miami Dolphins	March 16	

=== Draft ===
Detroit held the second overall pick in the draft. They had also gained the final pick in the first round, number 32, from the LA Rams. With days until the Draft, the Lions were heavily projected to draft University of Michigan's defensive end Aidan Hutchinson. After the Jaguars chose Travon Walker with the first overall pick, the Lions made their selection choosing Hutchinson. Holmes reflected on Hutchinson being a Michigan native, saying "It's always great to get the hometown favorite, but I know there's a lot of fanfare for Aidan. His ability to stay home and hopefully be, not only a productive player for our football team, but I know that he'll make his mark in this community. He already has so it's only gonna continue to trend up from here."

With the Lions holding the 32nd and 34th picks, they traded them along with the 66th pick to the Minnesota Vikings for the 12th and 46th picks. With the 12th pick, the Lions chose wide receiver Jameson Williams, who was coming off an ACL tear in the 2022 national championship.

2022 Detroit Lions Draft
Round	Selection	Player	Position	College	Notes
1	2	Aidan Hutchinson	Defensive end	Michigan	
1	12	Jameson Williams	Wide receiver	Alabama	From Minnesota (Note: The Lions traded first-, second- and third-round selections (32nd, 34th and 66th overall) to the Minnesota Vikings in exchange for first- and second-round selections (12th and 46th overall).)
1	32	Traded to Minnesota			From LA Rams (Note: The Lions traded QB Matthew Stafford to the Los Angeles Rams in exchange for QB Jared Goff, a first-round selection (32nd overall), a 2021 third-round selection and a 2023 first-round selection.)
2	34	Traded to Minnesota			
2	46	Josh Paschal	Defensive end	Kentucky	From Minnesota
3	66	Traded to Minnesota			
3	97	Kerby Joseph	Free safety	Illinois	Compensatory selection (Note: Compensatory selections awarded to the Detroit Lions. Under the rules for compensatory draft selections, a team losing more or better compensatory free agents than it acquires in the previous year is eligible to receive compensatory picks. Compensatory free agents are determined by a formula based on salary, playing time and postseason honors. The formula was developed by the NFL management council. Not every free agent lost or signed by a club is covered by this formula, and no club may receive more than four compensatory picks in any one year.)
4	107	Traded to Cleveland (Note: The Lions traded a fourth-round selection (107th overall) and a 2021 fifth-round selection to the Cleveland Browns in exchange for 2021 fourth- and seventh-round selections.)			
5	145	Traded to Denver (Note: The Lions traded fifth- and seventh-round selections (145th and 234th overall) to the Denver Broncos in exchange for WR Trinity Benson and a 2023 sixth-round pick.)			
5	177	James Mitchell	Tight end	Virginia Tech	Compensatory selection
6	181	Traded to Philadelphia (Note: The Lions traded a sixth-round selection (181st overall) to the Philadelphia Eagles in exchange for sixth- and seventh-round selections (188th and 237th overall).)			
6	188	Malcolm Rodriguez	Linebacker	Oklahoma State	From Seattle via Jacksonville and Philadelphia
6	217	James Houston IV	Linebacker	Jackson State	Compensatory selection
7	223	Traded to Cleveland (Note: The Lions traded a conditional seventh-round selection (223rd overall) in exchange for QB David Blough and a seventh-round selection (234th overall).)			
7	234	Traded to Denver			From Cleveland
7	237	Chase Lucas	Cornerback	Arizona State	From New Orleans via Philadelphia

Notes

2022 Detroit Lions undrafted free agents
Name	Position	College	Ref.
Greg Bell	RB	San Diego State	
Cedric Boswell	CB	Miami (OH)	
Derrick Deese Jr.	TE	San Jose State	
Obinna Eze	OT	TCU	
Nolan Givan	TE	Southeastern Louisiana	
Kevin Jarvis	G	Michigan State	
Josh Johnson	WR	Tulsa	
Zein Obeid	G	Ferris State	
Kalil Pimpleton	WR	Central Michigan	
Corey Sutton	WR	Appalachian State	
Demetrius Taylor	DT	Appalachian State	
Jermaine Waller	CB	Virginia Tech	

== Staff ==
2022 Detroit Lions staff
Front office: Owner – Sheila Ford Hamp; Vice chairpeople – William Clay Ford Jr., Martha Ford Morse and Elizabeth Ford Kontulis; Team president – Rod Wood; Chief operating officer - Mike Disner; Special assistant to chairman and president & CEO – Chris Spielman; Executive vice president/general manager – Brad Holmes; Assistant general manager – Ray Agnew; Director of player personnel – Lance Newmark; Director of pro scouting – Rob Lohman; Director of college scouting – Dave Sears; Director of scouting advancement – Mike Martin; Senior director of football administration – Brandon Sosna; Senior personnel executive – John Dorsey; Head coaches: Head coach – Dan Campbell; Assistant head coach/running backs – Duce Staley; Offensive coaches: Offensive coordinator – Ben Johnson; Quarterbacks – Mark Brunell; Wide receivers – Antwaan Randle El; Assistant wide receivers – Seth Ryan; Tight ends/passing game coordinator – Tanner Engstrand; Offensive line – Hank Fraley; Senior offensive assistant – John Morton; Offensive quality control – Steve Oliver; Offensive assistant – J. T. Barrett; WCF minority fellowship – Deon'tae Pannell	Defensive coaches: Defensive coordinator – Aaron Glenn; Defensive line – Todd Wash; Assistant defensive line – Cameron Davis; Linebackers – Kelvin Sheppard; Safeties – Brian Duker; Defensive assistant/outside linebackers – David Corrao; Defensive quality control – Addison Lynch; Defensive quality control – Wayne Blair; WCF minority fellowship – Shaun Dion Hamilton; Special teams coaches: Special teams coordinator – Dave Fipp; Assistant special teams – Jett Modkins; Strength and conditioning: Director of sports performance – Mike Clark; Director of sports science – Jill Costanza; Head strength & conditioning – Josh Schuler; Assistant strength & conditioning – Morris Henry

=== Coaching changes ===
- January 10: Anthony Lynn fired as offensive coordinator.
- February 9: Ben Johnson named offensive coordinator.
- October 31: Aubrey Pleasant fired as defensive backs coach.

== Final roster ==
2022 Detroit Lions roster
Quarterbacks (QB): 16 Jared Goff; 10 Nate Sudfeld; Running backs (RB): 45 Jason Cabinda; 42 Justin Jackson; 46 Craig Reynolds; 32 D'Andre Swift; 30 Jamaal Williams; Wide receivers (WR): 4 D. J. Chark; 11 Kalif Raymond; 8 Josh Reynolds; 14 Amon-Ra St. Brown; 9 Jameson Williams; Tight ends (TE): 82 James Mitchell; 89 Brock Wright; 84 Shane Zylstra	Offensive linemen (OL): 74 Kayode Awosika G; 63 Evan Brown G/C; 68 Taylor Decker T; 73 Jonah Jackson G; 67 Matt Nelson T; 66 Ross Pierschbacher G; 77 Frank Ragnow C; 58 Penei Sewell T; 70 Dan Skipper G/T; 71 Logan Stenberg G; Defensive linemen (DL): 90 Michael Brockers DT; 2 Austin Bryant DE; 96 Isaiah Buggs DT; 79 John Cominsky DE; 97 Aidan Hutchinson DE; 94 Benito Jones DT; 54 Alim McNeill DT; 95 Romeo Okwara DE; 93 Josh Paschal DE	Linebackers (LB): 34 Alex Anzalone MLB; 55 Derrick Barnes OLB; 49 Chris Board OLB; 59 James Houston OLB; 57 Anthony Pittman OLB; 44 Malcolm Rodriguez OLB; 51 Josh Woods MLB; Defensive backs (DB): 5 DeShon Elliott FS; 25 Will Harris CB; 23 Mike Hughes CB; 39 Jerry Jacobs CB; 31 Kerby Joseph SS; 26 Ifeatu Melifonwu FS/CB; 38 C. J. Moore SS; 1 Jeff Okudah CB; 24 Amani Oruwariye CB; Special teams (ST): 17 Michael Badgley K; 47 Scott Daly LS; 3 Jack Fox P	Practice squad: 15 Maurice Alexander WR; 83 Stanley Berryhill WR; 15 Brady Breeze SS; 43 Khalil Dorsey CB; 65 Obinna Eze T (PS/I); 18 Sam Ficken K; 86 Garrett Griffin TE; 28 Jermar Jefferson RB; 85 Tom Kennedy WR; 12 Steven Montez QB; 41 A. J. Parker CB; 60 Darrin Paulo T; 19 Saivion Smith FS/CB; 40 Julian Stanford MLB; 52 Demetrius Taylor DT; 33 Jarren Williams CB; 62 Jarrid Williams T; 13 Brandon Zylstra WR; Reserve: -- Greg Bell RB (IR); 17 Trinity Benson WR (IR); 87 Quintez Cephus WR (IR/DFR); 53 Charles Harris DE (IR); 78 Tommy Kraemer G (IR); 36 Chase Lucas CB (IR); 99 Julian Okwara OLB (IR); 91 Levi Onwuzurike DT (IR); 27 Bobby Price CB (IR); 21 Tracy Walker SS (IR); 72 Halapoulivaati Vaitai G (IR); Rookies in italics 53 active, 11 reserve, 16 practice squad (2 exempt)

== Preseason ==
Week	Date	Opponent	Result	Record	Venue	Recap
1	August 12	Atlanta Falcons	L 23–27	0–1	Ford Field	Recap
2	August 20	at Indianapolis Colts	W 27–26	1–1	Lucas Oil Stadium	Recap
3	August 28	at Pittsburgh Steelers	L 9–19	1–2	Acrisure Stadium	Recap

== Regular season ==
=== Schedule ===
Week	Date	Opponent	Result	Record	Venue	Recap
1	September 11	Philadelphia Eagles	**L** 35–38	0–1	Ford Field	Recap
2	September 18	Washington Commanders	**W** 36–27	1–1	Ford Field	Recap
3	September 25	at **Minnesota Vikings**	**L** 24–28	1–2	U.S. Bank Stadium	Recap
4	October 2	Seattle Seahawks	**L** 45–48	1–3	Ford Field	Recap
5	October 9	at New England Patriots	**L** 0–29	1–4	Gillette Stadium	Recap
6	Bye					
7	October 23	at Dallas Cowboys	**L** 6–24	1–5	AT&T Stadium	Recap
8	October 30	Miami Dolphins	**L** 27–31	1–6	Ford Field	Recap
9	November 6	**Green Bay Packers**	**W** 15–9	2–6	Ford Field	Recap
10	November 13	at **Chicago Bears**	**W** 31–30	3–6	Soldier Field	Recap
11	November 20	at New York Giants	**W** 31–18	4–6	MetLife Stadium	Recap
12	November 24	Buffalo Bills	**L** 25–28	4–7	Ford Field	Recap
13	December 4	Jacksonville Jaguars	**W** 40–14	5–7	Ford Field	Recap
14	December 11	**Minnesota Vikings**	**W** 34–23	6–7	Ford Field	Recap
15	December 18	at New York Jets	**W** 20–17	7–7	MetLife Stadium	Recap
16	December 24	at Carolina Panthers	**L** 23–37	7–8	Bank of America Stadium	Recap
17	January 1	**Chicago Bears**	**W** 41–10	8–8	Ford Field	Recap
18	January 8	at **Green Bay Packers**	**W** 20–16	9–8	Lambeau Field	Recap

Note: Intra-division opponents are in bold text.

=== Game summaries ===
==== Week 1: vs. Philadelphia Eagles ====
Week 1: Philadelphia Eagles at Detroit Lions – Game summary

Quarter	1	2	3	4	Total
**Eagles**	0	24	14	0	**38**
Lions	7	7	7	14	**35**

at Ford Field, Detroit, Michigan

- Date: September 11
- Game time: 1:00 p.m. EDT
- Game weather: None (indoor stadium)
- Game attendance: 64,537
- Referee: Brad Allen
- TV announcers (Fox): Adam Amin, Mark Schlereth, and Kristina Pink
- Recap, Game Book

Game information

**First quarter**

- DET – Jamaal Williams 1-yard run (Austin Seibert kick), 10:18. Lions 7–0. **Drive: 9 plays, 75 yards, 4:42.**

**Second quarter**

- PHI – Jalen Hurts 1-yard run (Jake Elliott kick), 12:56. Tied 7–7. **Drive: 13 plays, 82 yards, 7:55.**
- PHI – Miles Sanders 1-yard run (Jake Elliott kick), 7:34. Eagles 14–7. **Drive: 8 plays, 66 yards, 2:10.**
- PHI – James Bradberry 27-yard interception return (Jake Elliott kick), 6:26. Eagles 21–7. **Drive: 2 plays, 1:08.**
- DET – D'Andre Swift 7-yard run (Austin Seibert kick), 1:55. Eagles 21–14. **Drive: 10 plays, 75 yards, 4:31.**
- PHI – Jake Elliott 23-yard field goal, 0:06. Eagles 24–14. **Drive: 9 plays, 73 yards, 1:49.**

**Third quarter**

- PHI – Kenneth Gainwell 2-yard run (Jake Elliott kick), 10:21. Eagles 31–14. **Drive: 10 plays, 82 yards, 4:39.**
- DET – Amon-Ra St. Brown 4-yard pass from Jared Goff (Austin Seibert kick), 4:09. Eagles 31–21. **Drive: 14 plays, 75 yards, 6:12.**
- PHI – Boston Scott 1-yard run (Jake Elliott kick), 1:41. Eagles 38–21. **Drive: 5 plays, 49 yards, 2:28.**

**Fourth quarter**

- DET – Jamaal Williams 1-yard run (Austin Seibert kick), 14:16. Eagles 38–28. **Drive: 6 plays, 75 yards, 2:25.**
- DET – D. J. Chark 22-yard pass from Jared Goff (Austin Seibert kick), 3:51. Eagles 38–35. **Drive: 11 plays, 72 yards, 4:28.**

**Top passers**

- PHI – Jalen Hurts – 18/32, 243 yards
- DET – Jared Goff – 21/37, 215 yards, 2 TD, INT

**Top rushers**

- PHI – Miles Sanders – 13 rushes, 96 yards, TD
- DET – D'Andre Swift – 15 rushes, 144 yards, TD

**Top receivers**

- PHI – A. J. Brown – 10 receptions, 155 yards
- DET – Amon-Ra St. Brown – 8 receptions, 64 yards, TD

To open the regular season, the Lions hosted the Philadelphia Eagles. The Lions opened the scoring in the first quarter via a one-yard touchdown run from Jamaal Williams. The Eagles responded with 21 unanswered points in the second quarter via two one-yard touchdown runs from Jalen Hurts and Miles Sanders, respectively, and a 27-yard interception return by James Bradberry. The Lions responded with a seven-yard touchdown run from D'Andre Swift. The Eagles scored the final points of the half via a 23-yard field goal by Jake Elliott, which made the score 24–14 in favor of Philadelphia at half-time. The Eagles scored 14 points in the third quarter via a two-yard touchdown run from Kenneth Gainwell and a one-yard touchdown run from Boston Scott. The Lions responded with a four-yard touchdown pass from Jared Goff to Amon-Ra St. Brown. The Lions scored 14 points in the fourth quarter via a one-yard touchdown run from Williams and a 22-yard touchdown pass from Goff to D. J. Chark, making the final score 38–35 in favor of Philadelphia.

==== Week 2: vs. Washington Commanders ====
Week 2: Washington Commanders at Detroit Lions – Game summary

Quarter	1	2	3	4	Total
Commanders	0	0	15	12	**27**
**Lions**	12	10	7	7	**36**

at Ford Field, Detroit, Michigan

- Date: September 18
- Game time: 1:00 p.m. EDT
- Game weather: None (indoor stadium)
- Game attendance: 57,687
- Referee: Bill Vinovich
- TV announcers (Fox): Kenny Albert, Jonathan Vilma and Shannon Spake
- Recap, Game Book

Game information

**First quarter**

- DET – Austin Seibert 35-yard field goal, 8:06. Lions 3–0. **Drive: 7 plays, 63 yards, 3:26.**
- DET – Charles Harris safety, 3:17. Lions 5–0.
- DET – Amon-Ra St. Brown 13-yard pass from Jared Goff (Austin Seibert kick), 1:40. Lions 12–0. **Drive: 4 plays, 31 yards, 1:37.**

**Second quarter**

- DET – Austin Seibert 48-yard field goal, 13:47. Lions 15–0. **Drive: 5 plays, 28 yards, 1:14.**
- DET – Josh Reynolds 3-yard pass from Jared Goff (Austin Seibert kick), 6:43. Lions 22–0. **Drive: 9 plays, 77 yards, 5:27.**

**Third quarter**

- WSH – Curtis Samuel 15-yard pass from Carson Wentz (Joey Slye kick), 12:58. Lions 22–7. **Drive: 5 plays, 64 yards, 2:02.**
- WSH – Logan Thomas 20-yard pass from Carson Wentz (Carson Wentz–Jahan Dotson pass), 2:58. Lions 22–15. **Drive: 7 plays, 94 yards, 4:20.**
- DET – D'Andre Swift 22-yard pass from Jared Goff (Austin Seibert kick), 1:28. Lions 29–15. **Drive: 4 plays, 75 yards, 1:30.**

**Fourth quarter**

- WSH – Antonio Gibson 1-yard run (pass failed), 10:39. Lions 29–21. **Drive: 12 plays, 83 yards, 5:49.**
- DET – Amon-Ra St. Brown 11-yard pass from Jared Goff (Austin Seibert kick), 7:00. Lions 36–21. **Drive: 6 plays, 70 yards, 3:39.**
- WSH – Jahan Dotson 1-yard pass from Carson Wentz (kick failed), 1:56. Lions 36–27. **Drive: 14 plays, 76 yards, 5:04.**

**Top passers**

- WSH – Carson Wentz – 30/46, 337 yards, 3 TD, INT
- DET – Jared Goff – 20/34, 256 yards, 4 TD

**Top rushers**

- WSH – Antonio Gibson – 14 rushes, 28 yards, TD
- DET – Amon-Ra St. Brown – 2 rushes, 68 yards

**Top receivers**

- WSH – Curtis Samuel – 7 receptions, 78 yards, TD
- DET – Amon-Ra St. Brown – 9 receptions, 116 yards, 2 TD

In week 2, the Lions hosted the Washington Commanders. The Lions scored 12 points in the first quarter via a 35-yard field goal by Austin Seibert, a fumble forced by Charles Harris in the end zone for a safety, and a 13-yard touchdown pass from Jared Goff to Amon-Ra St. Brown. The Lions extended their lead in the second quarter via a 48-yard field goal by Seibert and a three-yard touchdown pass from Goff to Josh Reynolds, which made the score 22–0 in favor of Detroit at half-time. The Commanders finally got on the board in the third quarter via a 15-yard touchdown pass from Carson Wentz to Curtis Samuel and a 20-yard touchdown pass from Wentz to Logan Thomas. The Lions responded with a 22-yard touchdown pass from Goff to D'Andre Swift. The teams exchanged touchdowns in the fourth quarter, first a one-yard touchdown run from Antonio Gibson for the Commanders, then an 11-yard touchdown pass from Goff to St. Brown for the Lions. The Commanders scored the final points of the game via a one-yard touchdown pass from Wentz to Jahan Dotson, making the final score 36–27 in favor of Detroit.

Amon-Ra St. Brown had 2 touchdown receptions for the Lions and set an NFL record with his 6th consecutive game with 8+ catches.

==== Week 3: at Minnesota Vikings ====
Week 3: Detroit Lions at Minnesota Vikings – Game summary

Quarter	1	2	3	4	Total
Lions	7	7	10	0	**24**
**Vikings**	0	14	0	14	**28**

at U.S. Bank Stadium, Minneapolis, Minnesota

- Date: September 25
- Game time: 1:00 p.m. EDT/12:00 p.m. CDT
- Game weather: None (indoor stadium)
- Game attendance: 66,638
- Referee: John Hussey
- TV announcers (Fox): Brandon Gaudin, Brady Quinn and Megan Olivi
- Recap, Game Book

Game information

**First quarter**

- DET – Jamaal Williams 2-yard run (Austin Seibert kick), 6:44. Lions 7–0. **Drive: 6 plays, 54 yards, 2:36.**

**Second quarter**

- DET – T. J. Hockenson 5-yard pass from Jared Goff (Austin Seibert kick), 13:38. Lions 14–0. **Drive: 12 plays, 70 yards, 5:28.**
- MIN – Adam Thielen 1-yard pass from Kirk Cousins (Greg Joseph kick), 8:50. Lions 14–7. **Drive: 11 plays, 80 yards, 4:48.**
- MIN – Dalvin Cook 4-yard run (Greg Joseph kick), 1:12. Tied 14–14. **Drive: 9 plays, 49 yards, 3:46.**

**Third quarter**

- DET – Austin Seibert 40-yard field goal, 8:36. Lions 17–14. **Drive: 10 plays, 46 yards, 5:22.**
- DET – Jamaal Williams 13-yard run (Austin Seibert kick), 2:08. Lions 24–14. **Drive: 5 plays, 54 yards, 2:38.**

**Fourth quarter**

- MIN – Alexander Mattison 6-yard run (Greg Joseph kick), 7:50. Lions 24–21. **Drive: 6 plays, 57 yards, 2:49.**
- MIN – K. J. Osborn 28-yard pass from Kirk Cousins (Greg Joseph kick), 0:45. Vikings 28–24. **Drive: 3 plays, 56 yards, 0:25.**

**Top passers**

- DET – Jared Goff – 25/41, 277 yards, TD, INT
- MIN – Kirk Cousins – 24/41, 260 yards, 2 TD

**Top rushers**

- DET – Jamaal Williams – 20 rushes, 87 yards, 2 TD
- MIN – Dalvin Cook – 17 rushes, 96 yards, TD

**Top receivers**

- DET – Josh Reynolds – 6 receptions, 96 yards
- MIN – K. J. Osborn – 5 receptions, 73 yards, TD

In week 3, the Lions visited their divisional rival, the Minnesota Vikings. The Lions opened the scoring in the first quarter via a two-yard touchdown run from Jamaal Williams. The Lions extended their lead in the second quarter via a five-yard touchdown pass from Jared Goff to T. J. Hockenson. The Vikings responded with 14 points in the quarter via a one-yard touchdown pass from Kirk Cousins to Adam Thielen and a four-yard touchdown run from Dalvin Cook, tying the score at 14–14 at half-time. The Lions scored 10 points in the third quarter via a 40-yard field goal by Austin Seibert and a 13-yard touchdown run from Williams. The Vikings scored 14 points in the fourth quarter via a six-yard touchdown run from Alexander Mattison and a 28-yard touchdown pass from Cousins to K. J. Osborn with 45 seconds left in the half. The Lions' attempted comeback failed when Goff's pass intended for D. J. Chark was intercepted by Josh Metellus with 17 seconds remaining in the game, making the final score 28–24 in favor of Minnesota.

==== Week 4: vs. Seattle Seahawks ====
Week 4: Seattle Seahawks at Detroit Lions – Game summary

Quarter	1	2	3	4	Total
**Seahawks**	14	10	14	10	**48**
Lions	6	9	8	22	**45**

at Ford Field, Detroit, Michigan

- Date: October 2
- Game time: 1:00 p.m. EDT
- Game weather: None (indoor stadium)
- Game attendance: 63,920
- Referee: Clay Martin
- TV announcers (Fox): Chris Myers, Robert Smith and Jen Hale
- Recap, Game Book

Game information

**First quarter**

- SEA – Will Dissly 17-yard pass from Geno Smith (Jason Myers kick), 8:24. Seahawks 7–0. **Drive: 11 plays, 75 yards, 6:36.**
- DET – T. J. Hockenson 32-yard pass from Jared Goff (kick failed, wide left), 6:47. Seahawks 7–6. **Drive: 1 play, 32 yards, 0:07.**
- SEA – Geno Smith 8-yard run (Jason Myers kick), 4:35. Seahawks 14–6. **Drive: 5 plays, 75 yards, 2:12.**

**Second quarter**

- DET – Dominik Eberle 49-yard field goal, 13:07. Seahawks 14–9. **Drive: 12 plays, 41 yards, 6:28.**
- SEA – Jason Myers 56-yard field goal, 9:08. Seahawks 17–9. **Drive: 8 plays, 22 yards, 3:59.**
- SEA – Noah Fant 2-yard pass from Geno Smith (Jason Myers kick), 5:04. Seahawks 24–9. **Drive: 3 plays, 52 yards, 1:38.**
- DET – Jamaal Williams 1-yard run (kick failed, wide right), 0:00. Seahawks 24–15. **Drive: 12 plays, 75 yards, 5:04.**

**Third quarter**

- SEA – Tariq Woolen 40-yard interception return (Jason Myers kick), 14:49. Seahawks 31–15. **Drive: 1 play, 0 yards, 0:11.**
- DET – Jamaal Williams 51-yard run (Jared Goff run), 6:30. Seahawks 31–23. **Drive: 3 plays, 71 yards, 0:59.**
- SEA – Rashaad Penny 36-yard run (Jason Myers kick), 0:33. Seahawks 38–23. **Drive: 11 plays, 75 yards, 5:57.**

**Fourth quarter**

- DET – Josh Reynolds 3-yard pass from Jared Goff (Jared Goff–T. J. Hockenson pass), 14:23. Seahawks 38–31. **Drive: 3 plays, 75 yards, 1:10.**
- SEA – Jason Myers 25-yard field goal, 9:32. Seahawks 41–31. **Drive: 10 plays, 68 yards, 4:51.**
- DET – T. J. Hockenson 4-yard pass from Jared Goff (Dominik Eberle kick), 5:26. Seahawks 41–38. **Drive: 12 plays, 75 yards, 4:06.**
- SEA – Rashaad Penny 41-yard run (Jason Myers kick), 2:14. Seahawks 48–38. **Drive: 7 plays, 75 yards, 3:12.**
- DET – Justin Jackson 2-yard pass from Jared Goff (Dominik Eberle kick), 1:06. Seahawks 48–45. **Drive: 9 plays, 75 yards, 1:08.**

**Top passers**

- SEA – Geno Smith – 23/30, 320 yards, 2 TD
- DET – Jared Goff – 26/39, 378 yards, 4 TD, INT

**Top rushers**

- SEA – Rashaad Penny – 17 rushes, 151 yards, 2 TD
- DET – Jamaal Williams – 19 rushes, 108 yards, 2 TD

**Top receivers**

- SEA – DK Metcalf – 7 receptions, 149 yards
- DET – T. J. Hockenson – 8 receptions, 179 yards, 2 TD

In week 4, the Lions hosted the Seattle Seahawks. The Seahawks opened the scoring in the first quarter via a 17-yard touchdown pass from Geno Smith to Will Dissly. The Lions responded with a 32-yard touchdown pass from Jared Goff to T. J. Hockenson, Dominik Eberle's extra point was wide left. The Seahawks extended their lead via an eight-yard touchdown run from Smith. The Seahawks scored 10 points in the second quarter via a 56-yard field goal by Jason Myers and a two-yard touchdown pass from Smith to Noah Fant. The Lions scored nine points in the quarter via a 49-yard field goal by Eberle and a one-yard touchdown run from Jamaal Williams as time expired in the half. Eberle's extra point was wide right, which made the score 24–15 in favor of Seattle at half-time. The Seahawks scored 14 points in the third quarter via a 40-yard interception return by Tariq Woolen and a 36-yard touchdown run from Rashaad Penny. The Lions responded with a 51-yard touchdown run from Williams and a two-point conversion run by Goff. The Seahawks scored 10 points in the fourth quarter via a 25-yard field goal by Myers and a 41-yard touchdown run from Penny. The Lions scored 22 points in the quarter via a three-yard touchdown pass from Goff to Josh Reynolds and a two-point conversion pass from Goff to Hockenson, a four-yard touchdown pass from Goff to Hockenson, and a two-yard touchdown pass from Goff to Justin Jackson. The Lions' attempted comeback failed when the onside kick was recovered by the Seahawks, making the final score 48–45 in favor of Seattle.

==== Week 5: at New England Patriots ====
Week 5: Detroit Lions at New England Patriots – Game summary

Quarter	1	2	3	4	Total
Lions	0	0	0	0	**0**
**Patriots**	3	13	10	3	**29**

at Gillette Stadium, Foxborough, Massachusetts

- Date: October 9
- Game time: 1:00 p.m. EDT
- Game weather: Sunny, 58 °F (14 °C)
- Game attendance: 65,878
- Referee: Craig Wrolstad
- TV announcers (Fox): Kenny Albert, Jonathan Vilma and Shannon Spake
- Recap, Game Book

Game information

**First quarter**

- NE – Nick Folk 37-yard field goal, 8:47. Patriots 3–0. **Drive: 6 plays, 26 yards, 2:22.**

**Second quarter**

- NE – Nick Folk 32-yard field goal, 14:14. Patriots 6–0. **Drive: 11 plays, 83 yards, 6:18.**
- NE – Kyle Dugger 59-yard fumble return (Nick Folk kick), 3:26. Patriots 13–0. **Drive: 8 plays, 9 yards, 4:06.**
- NE – Nick Folk 44-yard field goal, 0:00. Patriots 16–0. **Drive: 6 plays, 61 yards, 1:46.**

**Third quarter**

- NE – Nick Folk 37-yard field goal, 10:09. Patriots 19–0. **Drive: 9 plays, 56 yards, 4:51.**
- NE – Jakobi Meyers 24-yard pass from Bailey Zappe (Nick Folk kick), 8:24. Patriots 26–0. **Drive: 8 plays, 6 yards, 4:43.**

**Fourth quarter**

- NE – Nick Folk 29-yard field goal, 5:01. Patriots 29–0. **Drive: 7 plays, 57 yards, 4:19.**

**Top passers**

- DET – Jared Goff – 19/35, 229 yards, INT
- NE – Bailey Zappe – 17/21, 188 yards, TD, INT

**Top rushers**

- DET – Jamaal Williams – 15 rushes, 56 yards
- NE – Rhamondre Stevenson – 25 rushes, 161 yards

**Top receivers**

- DET – Josh Reynolds – 6 receptions, 92 yards
- NE – Jakobi Meyers – 7 receptions, 111 yards, TD

In week 5, the Lions visited the New England Patriots. The Patriots opened the scoring in the first quarter via a 37-yard field goal by Nick Folk. The Patriots scored 13 points in the second quarter via a 32-yard field goal by Folk, a 59-yard fumble return by Kyle Dugger and a 44-yard field goal by Folk, which made the score 16–0 in favor of New England at half-time. The Patriots scored 10 points in the third quarter via a 37-yard field goal by Folk, and a 24-yard touchdown pass from Bailey Zappe to Jakobi Meyers. The Patriots extended their lead in the fourth quarter via a 29-yard field goal by Folk, making the final score 29–0 in favor of New England. It was the Lions' first shutout loss since week 11 of 2020. The Lions failed to convert six fourth-down tries, the first time in NFL history a team failed to convert a fourth down with six or more tries in a game. The 1995 New England Patriots held the previous record, going 0–5 in a loss to the Denver Broncos. With the loss, the Lions went into their bye week at 1–4.

==== Week 7: at Dallas Cowboys ====
Week 7: Detroit Lions at Dallas Cowboys – Game summary

Quarter	1	2	3	4	Total
Lions	3	3	0	0	**6**
**Cowboys**	0	3	7	14	**24**

at AT&T Stadium, Arlington, Texas

- Date: October 23
- Game time: 1:00 p.m. EDT/12:00 p.m. CDT
- Game weather: None (retractable roof closed)
- Game attendance: 93,487
- Referee: Adrian Hill
- TV announcers (CBS): Jim Nantz, Tony Romo and Tracy Wolfson
- Recap, Game Book

Game information

**First quarter**

- DET – Michael Badgley 40-yard field goal, 3:58. Lions 3–0. **Drive: 10 plays, 49 yards, 4:55.**

**Second quarter**

- DAL – Brett Maher 22-yard field goal, 12:24. Tied 3–3. **Drive: 12 plays, 72 yards, 6:34.**
- DET – Michael Badgley 53-yard field goal, 7:59. Lions 6–3. **Drive: 8 plays, 41 yards, 4:25.**

**Third quarter**

- DAL – Ezekiel Elliott 1-yard run (Brett Maher kick), 10:18. Cowboys 10–6. **Drive: 7 plays, 82 yards, 3:19.**

**Fourth quarter**

- DAL – Ezekiel Elliott 1-yard run (Brett Maher kick), 2:46. Cowboys 17–6. **Drive: 11 plays, 54 yards, 5:39.**
- DAL – Peyton Hendershot 2-yard pass from Dak Prescott (Brett Maher kick), 1:55. Cowboys 24–6. **Drive: 4 plays, 24 yards, 0:25.**

**Top passers**

- DET – Jared Goff – 21/26, 228 yards, 2 INT
- DAL – Dak Prescott – 19/25, 207 yards, TD

**Top rushers**

- DET – Jamaal Williams – 15 rushes, 79 yards
- DAL – Tony Pollard – 12 rushes, 83 yards

**Top receivers**

- DET – Kalif Raymond – 5 receptions, 75 yards
- DAL – CeeDee Lamb – 4 receptions, 70 yards

Following their bye week, in week 7, the Lions visited the Dallas Cowboys. The Lions opened the scoring in the first quarter via a 40-yard field goal by Michael Badgley. The Cowboys tied the game in the second quarter via a 22-yard field goal by Brett Maher. The Lions responded with a 53-yard field goal by Badgley, which made the score 6–3 in favor of Detroit at half-time. The Lions were held scoreless in the second half. The Cowboys scored a one-yard touchdown run from Ezekiel Elliott in the third quarter to take their first lead of the game. The Cowboys scored 14 points in the fourth quarter via a one-yard touchdown run from Elliott and a two-yard touchdown pass from Dak Prescott to Peyton Hendershot, making the final score 24–6 in favor of Dallas.

==== Week 8: vs. Miami Dolphins ====
Week 8: Miami Dolphins at Detroit Lions – Game summary

Quarter	1	2	3	4	Total
**Dolphins**	7	10	14	0	**31**
Lions	14	13	0	0	**27**

at Ford Field, Detroit, Michigan

- Date: October 30
- Game time: 1:00 p.m. EDT
- Game weather: None (indoor stadium)
- Game attendance: 61,447
- Referee: Alex Kemp
- TV announcers (CBS): Andrew Catalon, James Lofton and Amanda Renner
- Recap, Game Book

Game information

**First quarter**

- DET – Jamaal Williams 7-yard run (Michael Badgley kick), 12:59. Lions 7–0. **Drive: 5 plays, 75 yards, 2:01.**
- DET – D'Andre Swift 7-yard pass from Jared Goff (Michael Badgley kick), 5:36. Lions 14–0. **Drive: 6 plays, 78 yards, 2:31.**
- MIA – Jaylen Waddle 5-yard pass from Tua Tagovailoa (Jason Sanders kick), 0:50. Lions 14–7. **Drive: 9 plays, 80 yards, 4:46.**

**Second quarter**

- DET – Jamaal Williams 1-yard run (Michael Badgley kick), 13:46. Lions 21–7. **Drive: 6 plays, 75 yards, 2:04.**
- MIA – Jaylen Waddle 29-yard pass from Tua Tagovailoa (Jason Sanders kick), 11:30. Lions 21–14. **Drive: 4 plays, 75 yards, 2:16.**
- DET – Michael Badgley 42-yard field goal, 7:02. Lions 24–14. **Drive: 11 plays, 51 yards, 4:28.**
- MIA – Jason Sanders 45-yard field goal, 2:06. Lions 24–17. **Drive: 11 plays, 48 yards, 4:56.**
- DET – Michael Badgley 26-yard field goal, 0:00. Lions 27–17. **Drive: 11 plays, 67 yards, 2:06.**

**Third quarter**

- MIA – Alec Ingold 1-yard run (Jason Sanders kick), 9:11. Lions 27–24. **Drive: 9 plays, 75 yards, 5:49.**
- MIA – Mike Gesicki 11-yard pass from Tua Tagovailoa (Jason Sanders kick), 0:12. Dolphins 31–27. **Drive: 9 plays, 67 yards, 5:04.**

**Fourth quarter**

- No scoring plays.

**Top passers**

- MIA – Tua Tagovailoa – 29/36, 382 yards, 3 TD
- DET – Jared Goff – 27/37, 321 yards, TD

**Top rushers**

- MIA – Raheem Mostert – 14 rushes, 64 yards
- DET – Jamaal Williams – 10 rushes, 53 yards, 2 TD

**Top receivers**

- MIA – Tyreek Hill – 12 receptions, 188 yards
- DET – T. J. Hockenson – 3 receptions, 80 yards

In week 8, the Lions hosted the Miami Dolphins. The Lions scored 14 points in the first quarter via a seven-yard touchdown run from Jamaal Williams and a seven-yard touchdown pass from Jared Goff to D'Andre Swift. The Dolphins responded with a five-yard touchdown pass from Tua Tagovailoa to Jaylen Waddle. The Dolphins scored 10 points in the second quarter via a 29-yard touchdown pass from Tagovailoa to Waddle and a 45-yard field goal by Jason Sanders. The Lions scored 13 points in the quarter via a one-yard touchdown run from Williams, and two field goals by Michael Badgley, from 42-yards and 26-yards, respectively, which made the score 27–17 in favor of Detroit at half-time. The Lions were held scoreless in the second-half. The Dolphins scored 14 points in the third quarter via a one-yard touchdown run from Alec Ingold and an 11-yard touchdown pass from Tagovailoa to Mike Gesicki. Neither team scored in the fourth quarter, making the final score 31–27 in favor of Miami.

==== Week 9: vs. Green Bay Packers ====
Week 9: Green Bay Packers at Detroit Lions – Game summary

Quarter	1	2	3	4	Total
Packers	0	0	6	3	**9**
**Lions**	0	8	0	7	**15**

at Ford Field, Detroit, Michigan

- Date: November 6
- Game time: 1:00 p.m. EST
- Game weather: None (indoor stadium)
- Game attendance: 63,379
- Referee: Tra Blake
- TV announcers (Fox): Kevin Burkhardt, Greg Olsen, Tom Rinaldi and Erin Andrews
- Recap, Game Book

Game information

**First quarter**

- No scoring plays.

**Second quarter**

- DET – Shane Zylstra 1-yard pass from Jared Goff (Jamaal Williams run), 0:15. Lions 8–0. **Drive: 8 plays, 61 yards, 2:20.**

**Third quarter**

- GB – Allen Lazard 20-yard pass from Aaron Rodgers (pass failed), 4:53. Lions 8–6. **Drive: 7 plays, 54 yards, 3:22.**

**Fourth quarter**

- DET – James Mitchell 3-yard pass from Jared Goff (Michael Badgley kick), 14:51. Lions 15–6. **Drive: 13 plays, 70 yards, 5:02.**
- GB – Mason Crosby 25-yard field goal, 6:36. Lions 15–9. **Drive: 14 plays, 68 yards, 8:15.**

**Top passers**

- GB – Aaron Rodgers – 23/43, 291 yards, TD, 3 INT
- DET – Jared Goff – 14/26, 137 yards, 2 TD, INT

**Top rushers**

- GB – Aaron Rodgers – 4 rushes, 40 yards
- DET – Jamaal Williams – 24 rushes, 81 yards

**Top receivers**

- GB – Allen Lazard – 4 receptions, 87 yards, TD
- DET – Amon-Ra St. Brown – 4 receptions, 55 yards

In week 9, the Lions hosted their divisional rival, the Green Bay Packers. After a scoreless first quarter, the Lions opened the scoring in the second quarter via a one-yard touchdown pass from Jared Goff to Shane Zylstra and a two-point conversion run from Jamaal Williams, which made the score 8–0 in favor of Detroit at half-time. The Packers scored the only points of the third quarter via a 20-yard touchdown pass from Aaron Rodgers to Allen Lazard, but were unable to tie the score as the 2-point conversion attempt failed. The Lions extended their lead in the fourth quarter via a three-yard touchdown pass from Goff to James Mitchell. The Packers scored the final points of the game via a 25-yard field goal by Mason Crosby, making the final score 15–9 in favor of Detroit. The Lions' defense forced three interceptions, including two in the endzone. This marked the first game since week 15 of 2017 that Rodgers threw three interceptions.

==== Week 10: at Chicago Bears ====
Week 10: Detroit Lions at Chicago Bears – Game summary

Quarter	1	2	3	4	Total
**Lions**	3	7	0	21	**31**
Bears	3	7	14	6	**30**

at Soldier Field, Chicago, Illinois

- Date: November 13
- Game time: 1:00 p.m. EST/12:00 p.m. CST
- Game weather: Scattered clouds, 34 °F (1 °C)
- Game attendance: 61,817
- Referee: Land Clark
- TV announcers (Fox): Kevin Kugler, Mark Sanchez and Laura Okmin
- Recap, Game Book

Game information

**First quarter**

- CHI – Cairo Santos 33-yard field goal, 10:39. Bears 3–0. **Drive: 8 plays, 60 yards, 4:21.**
- DET – Michael Badgley 25-yard field goal, 3:21. Tied 3–3. **Drive: 14 plays, 68 yards, 7:18.**

**Second quarter**

- DET – Brock Wright 2-yard pass from Jared Goff (Michael Badgley kick), 7:18. Lions 10–3. **Drive: 13 plays, 80 yards, 7:26.**
- CHI – Justin Fields 1-yard run (Cairo Santos kick), 0:12. Tied 10–10. **Drive: 15 plays, 75 yards, 7:06.**

**Third quarter**

- CHI – Cole Kmet 6-yard pass from Justin Fields (Cairo Santos kick), 7:36. Bears 17–10. **Drive: 10 plays, 76 yards, 5:19.**
- CHI – Cole Kmet 50-yard pass from Justin Fields (Cairo Santos kick), 2:43. Bears 24–10. **Drive: 3 plays, 71 yards, 1:26.**

**Fourth quarter**

- DET – D'Andre Swift 9-yard run (Michael Badgley kick), 11:37. Bears 24–17. **Drive: 4 plays, 55 yards, 1:58.**
- DET – Jeff Okudah 20-yard interception return (Michael Badgley kick), 10:29. Tied 24–24. **Drive: 2 plays, -8 yards, 1:08.**
- CHI – Justin Fields 67-yard run (kick failed), 9:11. Bears 30–24. **Drive: 3 plays, 75 yards, 1:18.**
- DET – Jamaal Williams 1-yard run (Michael Badgley kick), 2:21. Lions 31–30. **Drive: 8 plays, 91 yards, 3:02.**

**Top passers**

- DET – Jared Goff – 19/26, 236 yards, TD
- CHI – Justin Fields – 12/20, 167 yards, 2 TD, INT

**Top rushers**

- DET – Jamaal Williams – 16 rushes, 59 yards, TD
- CHI – Justin Fields – 13 rushes, 147 yards, 2 TD

**Top receivers**

- DET – Amon-Ra St. Brown – 10 receptions, 119 yards
- CHI – Cole Kmet – 4 receptions, 74 yards, 2 TD

In week 10, the Lions visited their divisional rival, the Chicago Bears. The Bears opened the scoring in the first quarter via a 33-yard field goal by Cairo Santos. The Lions responded with a 25-yard field goal by Michael Badgley to tie the game. The teams exchanged touchdowns in the second quarter, first a two-yard touchdown pass from Jared Goff to Brock Wright for the Lions, then a one-yard touchdown run from Justin Fields for the Bears, tying the score at 10–10 at half-time. The Bears scored 14 points in the third quarter via two touchdown passes from Fields to Cole Kmet from six-yards, and 50-yards, respectively. The Lions scored 21 points in the fourth quarter via a nine-yard touchdown run from D'Andre Swift, a 20-yard interception return by Jeff Okudah and a one-yard touchdown run from Jamaal Williams. The Bears responded with a 67-yard touchdown run from Fields, however they missed the extra point, making the final score 31–30 in favor of Detroit.

==== Week 11: at New York Giants ====
Week 11: Detroit Lions at New York Giants – Game summary

Quarter	1	2	3	4	Total
**Lions**	3	14	7	7	**31**
Giants	6	0	0	12	**18**

at MetLife Stadium, East Rutherford, New Jersey

- Date: November 20
- Game time: 1:00 p.m. EST
- Game weather: Fair and breezy, 35 °F (2 °C)
- Game attendance: 76,267
- Referee: Brad Rogers
- TV announcers (Fox): Kevin Burkhardt, Greg Olsen and Erin Andrews
- Recap, Game Book

Game information

**First quarter**

- DET – Michael Badgley 24-yard field goal, 7:52. Lions 3–0. **Drive: 11 plays, 64 yards, 5:06.**
- NYG – Daniel Jones 3-yard run (Graham Gano kick blocked), 2:41. Giants 6–3. **Drive: 11 plays, 75 yards, 5:11.**

**Second quarter**

- DET – Jamaal Williams 4-yard run (Michael Badgley kick), 4:38. Lions 10–6. **Drive: 3 plays, 18 yards, 1:31.**
- DET – Jamaal Williams 1-yard run (Michael Badgley kick), 0:54. Lions 17–6. **Drive: 7 plays, 68 yards, 1:25.**

**Third quarter**

- DET – Jamaal Williams 1-yard run (Michael Badgley kick), 10:10. Lions 24–6. **Drive: 9 plays, 56 yards, 4:50.**

**Fourth quarter**

- NYG – Matt Breida 3-yard run (kick failed), 13:21. Lions 24–12. **Drive: 9 plays, 67 yards, 3:01.**
- DET – D'Andre Swift 4-yard run (Michael Badgley kick), 6:10. Lions 31–12. **Drive: 4 plays, 33 yards, 1:43.**
- NYG – Richie James 9-yard pass from Daniel Jones (pass failed), 4:20. Lions 31–18. **Drive: 6 plays, 75 yards, 1:50.**

**Top passers**

- DET – Jared Goff – 17/26, 165 yards
- NYG – Daniel Jones – 27/44, 341 yards, TD, 2 INT

**Top rushers**

- DET – Justin Jackson – 9 rushes, 66 yards
- NYG – Daniel Jones – 7 rushes, 50 yards, TD

**Top receivers**

- DET – Amon-Ra St. Brown – 7 receptions, 76 yards
- NYG – Wan'Dale Robinson – 9 receptions, 100 yards

In week 11, the Lions visited the New York Giants. The Lions opened the scoring in the first quarter via a 24-yard field goal by Michael Badgley. The Giants responded with a three-yard touchdown run from Daniel Jones. John Cominsky blocked the extra point. The Lions scored 14 points in the second quarter via two touchdown runs from Jamaal Williams from four-yards, and one-yard, respectively, which made the score 17–6 in favor of Detroit at half-time. The Lions scored the only points of the third quarter via a one-yard touchdown run from Williams. The Giants scored 12 points in the fourth quarter via a three-yard touchdown run from Matt Breida and a nine-yard touchdown pass from Jones to Richie James. The Lions extended their lead via a four-yard touchdown run from D'Andre Swift, making the final score 31–18 in favor of Detroit. The win marked the Lions' first three-game winning streak since 2017.

==== Week 12: vs. Buffalo Bills ====
Week 12: Buffalo Bills at Detroit Lions – Game summary

Quarter	1	2	3	4	Total
**Bills**	7	10	2	9	**28**
Lions	7	7	0	11	**25**

at Ford Field, Detroit, Michigan

- Date: November 24
- Game time: 12:30 p.m. EST
- Game weather: None (indoor stadium)
- Game attendance: 66,553
- Referee: Clete Blakeman
- TV announcers (CBS): Jim Nantz, Tony Romo and Tracy Wolfson
- Recap, Game Book

Game information

**First quarter**

- DET – Jamaal Williams 2-yard run (Michael Badgley kick), 6:44. Lions 7–0. **Drive: 12 plays, 61 yards, 6:17.**
- BUF – Isaiah McKenzie 19-yard pass from Josh Allen (Tyler Bass kick), 1:58. Tied 7–7. **Drive: 10 plays, 75 yards, 4:46.**

**Second quarter**

- BUF – Josh Allen 3-yard run (Tyler Bass kick), 7:55. Bills 14–7. **Drive: 10 plays, 58 yards, 5:28.**
- DET – Amon-Ra St. Brown 1-yard pass from Jared Goff (Michael Badgley kick), 1:52. Tied 14–14. **Drive: 15 plays, 76 yards, 6:03.**
- BUF – Tyler Bass 47-yard field goal, 0:00. Bills 17–14. **Drive: 10 plays, 47 yards, 1:52.**

**Third quarter**

- BUF – Ed Oliver safety, 9:05. Bills 19–14.

**Fourth quarter**

- DET – D. J. Chark 1-yard pass from Jared Goff (D'Andre Swift run), 13:47. Lions 22–19. **Drive: 5 plays, 35 yards, 2:09.**
- BUF – Stefon Diggs 5-yard pass from Josh Allen (kick failed), 2:40. Bills 25–22. **Drive: 14 plays, 90 yards, 6:19.**
- DET – Michael Badgley 51-yard field goal, 0:23. Tied 25–25. **Drive: 10 plays, 42 yards, 2:17.**
- BUF – Tyler Bass 45-yard field goal, 0:02. Bills 28–25. **Drive: 4 plays, 48 yards, 0:21.**

**Top passers**

- BUF – Josh Allen – 24/42, 253 yards, 2 TD, INT
- DET – Jared Goff – 23/37, 240 yards, 2 TD

**Top rushers**

- BUF – Josh Allen – 10 rushes, 78 yards, TD
- DET – Jamaal Williams – 18 rushes, 66 yards, TD

**Top receivers**

- BUF – Stefon Diggs – 8 receptions, 77 yards, TD
- DET – Amon-Ra St. Brown – 9 receptions, 122 yards, TD

For their annual Thanksgiving Day game, the Lions hosted the Buffalo Bills. The Lions opened the scoring in the first quarter via a two-yard touchdown run from Jamaal Williams. The Bills responded with a 19-yard touchdown pass from Josh Allen to Isaiah McKenzie to tie the game. In the second quarter, the Bills took their first lead of the game via a three-yard touchdown run from Allen. The Lions responded with a one-yard touchdown pass from Jared Goff to Amon-Ra St. Brown. The Bills scored the final points of the half via a 47-yard field goal by Tyler Bass, which made the score 17–14 in favor of Buffalo at half-time. The Bills scored the only points of the third quarter after they sacked Goff in the end zone for a safety. The Lions regained the lead in the fourth quarter via a one-yard touchdown pass from Goff to D. J. Chark and a two-point conversion run by D'Andre Swift. The Bills responded with a five-yard touchdown pass from Allen to Stefon Diggs. The Lions scored via a 51-yard field goal by Michael Badgley to tie the score with 23 seconds remaining in the game. The Bills responded with a 45-yard field goal by Bass with two seconds remaining in the game, making the final score 28–25 in favor of Buffalo.

==== Week 13: vs. Jacksonville Jaguars ====
Week 13: Jacksonville Jaguars at Detroit Lions – Game summary

Quarter	1	2	3	4	Total
Jaguars	3	3	8	0	**14**
**Lions**	14	9	7	10	**40**

at Ford Field, Detroit, Michigan

- Date: December 4
- Game time: 1:00 p.m. EST
- Game weather: None (indoor stadium)
- Game attendance: 60,743
- Referee: Jerome Boger
- TV announcers (Fox): Chris Myers, Robert Smith and Jen Hale
- Recap, Game Book

Game information

**First quarter**

- DET – Jamaal Williams 1-yard run (Michael Badgley kick), 10:55. Lions 7–0. **Drive: 7 plays, 38 yards, 3:13.**
- JAX – Riley Patterson 31-yard field goal, 7:42. Lions 7–3. **Drive: 10 plays, 62 yards, 3:13.**
- DET – Amon-Ra St. Brown 10-yard pass from Jared Goff (Michael Badgley kick), 4:04. Lions 14–3. **Drive: 7 plays, 75 yards, 3:38.**

**Second quarter**

- DET – Michael Badgley 45-yard field goal, 12:39. Lions 17–3. **Drive: 9 plays, 59 yards, 3:17.**
- DET – Michael Badgley 47-yard field goal, 6:57. Lions 20–3. **Drive: 8 plays, 41 yards, 4:35.**
- JAX – Riley Patterson 42-yard field goal, 4:15. Lions 20–6. **Drive: 9 plays, 51 yards, 2:43.**
- DET – Michael Badgley 38-yard field goal, 0:31. Lions 23–6. **Drive: 11 plays, 47 yards, 3:44.**

**Third quarter**

- DET – D'Andre Swift 1-yard run (Michael Badgley kick), 10:35. Lions 30–6. **Drive: 10 plays, 61 yards, 4:25.**
- JAX – Evan Engram 3-yard pass from Trevor Lawrence (Trevor Lawrence–Jamal Agnew pass), 2:54. Lions 30–14. **Drive: 16 plays, 75 yards, 7:41.**

**Fourth quarter**

- DET – Michael Badgley 44-yard field goal, 12:21. Lions 33–14. **Drive: 12 plays, 49 yards, 5:33.**
- DET – Amon-Ra St. Brown 4-yard pass from Jared Goff (Michael Badgley kick), 2:43. Lions 40–14. **Drive: 12 plays, 68 yards, 7:33.**

**Top passers**

- JAX – Trevor Lawrence – 17/31, 179 yards, TD
- DET – Jared Goff – 31/41, 340 yards, 2 TD

**Top rushers**

- JAX – Travis Etienne – 13 rushes, 54 yards
- DET – D'Andre Swift – 14 rushes, 62 yards, TD

**Top receivers**

- JAX – Christian Kirk – 6 receptions, 104 yards
- DET – Amon-Ra St. Brown – 11 receptions, 114 yards, 2 TD

In week 13, the Lions hosted the Jacksonville Jaguars. The Lions opened the scoring in the first quarter via a one-yard touchdown run from Jamaal Williams. The Jaguars responded with a 31-yard field goal by Riley Patterson. The Lions extended their lead via 10-yard touchdown pass from Jared Goff to Amon-Ra St. Brown. The Lions scored nine points in the second quarter via three field goals by Michael Badgley from 45-yards, 47-yards, and 38-yards, respectively. The Jaguars scored via a 42-yard field goal by Patterson, which made the score 23–6 in favor of Detroit at half-time. The Lions extended their lead in the third quarter via a one-yard touchdown run from D'Andre Swift. The Jaguars scored their only points of the second half via a three-yard touchdown pass from Trevor Lawrence to Evan Engram and a two-point conversion pass from Lawrence to Jamal Agnew. The Lions scored 10 points in the fourth quarter via a 44-yard field goal by Badgley, and a four-yard touchdown pass from Goff to St. Brown, making the final score 40–14 in favor of Detroit.

==== Week 14: vs. Minnesota Vikings ====
Week 14: Minnesota Vikings at Detroit Lions – Game summary

Quarter	1	2	3	4	Total
Vikings	7	0	6	10	**23**
**Lions**	7	7	7	13	**34**

at Ford Field, Detroit, Michigan

- Date: December 11
- Game time: 1:00 p.m. EST
- Game weather: None (indoor stadium)
- Game attendance: 66,374
- Referee: Ronald Torbert
- TV announcers (Fox): Kenny Albert, Jonathan Vilma and Shannon Spake
- Recap, Game Book

Game information

**First quarter**

- DET – Jameson Williams 41-yard pass from Jared Goff (Michael Badgley kick), 10:27. Lions 7–0. **Drive: 2 plays, 46 yards, 0:51.**
- MIN – Dalvin Cook 1-yard run (Greg Joseph kick), 4:02. Tied 7–7. **Drive: 10 plays, 75 yards, 6:25.**

**Second quarter**

- DET – D. J. Chark 48-yard pass from Jared Goff (Michael Badgley kick), 6:34. Lions 14–7. **Drive: 1 play, 48 yards, 0:08.**

**Third quarter**

- DET – Josh Reynolds 5-yard pass from Jared Goff (Michael Badgley kick), 5:44. Lions 21–7. **Drive: 12 plays, 76 yards, 7:04.**
- MIN – Adam Thielen 23-yard pass from Kirk Cousins (pass failed), 2:17. Lions 21–13. **Drive: 7 plays, 75 yards, 3:27.**

**Fourth quarter**

- DET – Justin Jackson 15-yard run (Michael Badgley kick), 13:28. Lions 28–13. **Drive: 10 plays, 75 yards, 3:49.**
- MIN – Greg Joseph 41-yard field goal, 10:47. Lions 28–16. **Drive: 7 plays, 52 yards, 2:41.**
- DET – Michael Badgley 41-yard field goal, 4:06. Lions 31–16. **Drive: 12 plays, 52 yards, 6:41.**
- MIN – K. J. Osborn 15-yard pass from Kirk Cousins (Greg Joseph kick), 2:50. Lions 31–23. **Drive: 6 plays, 75 yards, 1:16.**
- DET – Michael Badgley 48-yard field goal, 0:17. Lions 34–23. **Drive: 7 plays, 14 yards, 2:33.**

**Top passers**

- MIN – Kirk Cousins – 31/41, 425 yards, 2 TD
- DET – Jared Goff – 27/39, 330 yards, 3 TD

**Top rushers**

- MIN – Dalvin Cook – 15 rushes, 23 yards, TD
- DET – C. J. Moore – 1 rush, 42 yards

**Top receivers**

- MIN – Justin Jefferson – 11 receptions, 223 yards
- DET – D. J. Chark – 6 receptions, 94 yards, TD

In week 14, the Lions hosted their divisional rival, the Minnesota Vikings, in a rematch of week 3. The Lions opened the scoring in the first quarter via a 41-yard touchdown pass from Jared Goff to Jameson Williams, for his first career NFL reception and first career NFL touchdown. The Vikings responded with a one-yard touchdown run from Dalvin Cook to tie the game. The Lions scored the only points of the second quarter via a 48-yard touchdown pass from Goff to D. J. Chark, which made the score 14–7 in favor of Detroit at half-time. The Lions extended their lead in the third quarter via a five-yard touchdown pass from Goff to Josh Reynolds. The Vikings responded with a 23-yard touchdown pass from Kirk Cousins to Adam Thielen and a failed two-point conversion attempt. The Vikings scored 10 points in the fourth quarter via a 41-yard field goal by Greg Joseph and a 15-yard touchdown pass from Cousins to K. J. Osborn. The Lions scored 13 points in the quarter via a 15-yard touchdown run from Justin Jackson and two field goals by Michael Badgley, from 41-yards, and 48-yards, respectively, making the final score 34–23 in favor of Detroit. This is the first time since 2017 in which the Lions defeated all three of their division rivals at least once in the same season.

==== Week 15: at New York Jets ====
Week 15: Detroit Lions at New York Jets – Game summary

Quarter	1	2	3	4	Total
**Lions**	7	3	3	7	**20**
Jets	0	10	0	7	**17**

at MetLife Stadium, East Rutherford, New Jersey

- Date: December 18
- Game time: 1:00 p.m. EST
- Game weather: Mostly sunny, 39 °F (4 °C)
- Game attendance: 75,076
- Referee: Craig Wrolstad
- TV announcers (CBS): Ian Eagle, Charles Davis and Evan Washburn
- Recap, Game Book

Game information

**First quarter**

- DET – Kalif Raymond 47-yard punt return (Michael Badgley kick), 6:00. Lions 7–0. **Drive: 3 plays, -1 yard, 0:55.**

**Second quarter**

- NYJ – C. J. Uzomah 40-yard pass from Zach Wilson (Greg Zuerlein kick), 14:06. Tied 7–7. **Drive: 3 plays, 78 yards, 1:09.**
- DET – Michael Badgley 31-yard field goal, 7:06. Lions 10–7. **Drive: 15 plays, 62 yards, 7:00.**
- NYJ – Greg Zuerlein 34-yard field goal, 0:00. Tied 10–10. **Drive: 5 plays, 65 yards, 0:25.**

**Third quarter**

- DET – Michael Badgley 34-yard field goal, 11:55. Lions 13–10. **Drive: 4 plays, -1 yard, 1:22.**

**Fourth quarter**

- NYJ – C. J. Uzomah 1-yard pass from Zach Wilson (Greg Zuerlein kick), 4:41. Jets 17–13. **Drive: 7 plays, 56 yards, 3:12.**
- DET – Brock Wright 51-yard pass from Jared Goff (Michael Badgley kick), 1:49. Lions 20–17. **Drive: 7 plays, 78 yards, 2:52.**

**Top passers**

- DET – Jared Goff – 23/38, 252 yards, TD
- NYJ – Zach Wilson – 18/35, 317 yards, 2 TD, INT

**Top rushers**

- DET – D'Andre Swift – 8 rushes, 52 yards
- NYJ – Zonovan Knight – 13 rushes, 23 yards

**Top receivers**

- DET – Amon-Ra St. Brown – 7 receptions, 76 yards
- NYJ – Garrett Wilson – 4 receptions, 98 yards

In week 15, the Lions visited the New York Jets for their second game at MetLife Stadium this season. The Lions opened the scoring in the first quarter via a 47-yard punt return touchdown by Kalif Raymond. In the second quarter, the Jets responded with a 40-yard touchdown pass from Zach Wilson to C. J. Uzomah to tie the game. The Lions regained the lead via a 31-yard field goal by Michael Badgley. The Jets responded with a 34-yard field goal by Greg Zuerlein as time expired in the half, tying the score at 10–10 at half-time. The Lions scored the only points of the third quarter via a 34-yard field goal by Badgley. In the fourth quarter, the Jets scored via a one-yard touchdown pass from Wilson to Uzomah, to take their first lead of the game. The Lions responded with a 51-yard touchdown pass from Jared Goff to Brock Wright, making the final score 20–17 in favor of Detroit. Zuerlein missed a 58-yard field goal wide left that would have sent the game to overtime with one second left.

==== Week 16: at Carolina Panthers ====
Week 16: Detroit Lions at Carolina Panthers – Game summary

Quarter	1	2	3	4	Total
Lions	7	0	6	10	**23**
**Panthers**	7	17	7	6	**37**

at Bank of America Stadium, Charlotte, North Carolina

- Date: December 24
- Game time: 1:00 p.m. EST
- Game weather: Sunny, 20 °F (−7 °C)
- Game attendance: 69,173
- Referee: Shawn Hochuli
- TV announcers (Fox): Chris Myers, Robert Smith and Jen Hale
- Recap, Game Book

Game information

**First quarter**

- CAR – Raheem Blackshear 7-yard run (Eddy Piñeiro kick), 11:57. Panthers 7–0. **Drive: 5 plays, 78 yards, 3:03.**
- DET – Shane Zylstra 3-yard pass from Jared Goff (Michael Badgley kick), 8:38. Tied 7–7. **Drive: 8 plays, 60 yards, 3:19.**

**Second quarter**

- CAR – Sam Darnold 3-yard run (Eddy Piñeiro kick), 9:35. Panthers 14–7. **Drive: 8 plays, 91 yards, 4:42.**
- CAR – D'Onta Foreman 4-yard run (Eddy Piñeiro kick), 2:08. Panthers 21–7. **Drive: 11 plays, 92 yards, 6:26.**
- CAR – Eddy Piñeiro 37-yard field goal, 0:00. Panthers 24–7. **Drive: 7 plays, 68 yards, 0:59.**

**Third quarter**

- CAR – D. J. Moore 5-yard pass from Sam Darnold (Eddy Piñeiro kick), 9:12. Panthers 31–7. **Drive: 7 plays, 74 yards, 3:34.**
- DET – Shane Zylstra 7-yard pass from Jared Goff (Run failed), 3:09. Panthers 31–13. **Drive: 7 plays, 80 yards, 3:12.**

**Fourth quarter**

- CAR – Eddy Piñeiro 40-yard field goal, 13:13. Panthers 34–13. **Drive: 10 plays, 47 yards, 4:56.**
- DET – Shane Zylstra 1-yard pass from Jared Goff (Michael Badgley kick), 3:46. Panthers 34–20. **Drive: 8 plays, 87 yards, 1:50.**
- CAR – Eddy Piñeiro 36-yard field goal, 1:56. Panthers 37–20. **Drive: 6 plays, 32 yards, 1:50.**
- DET – Michael Badgley 34-yard field goal, 0:36. Panthers 37–23. **Drive: 8 plays, 62 yards, 1:20.**

**Top passers**

- DET – Jared Goff – 25/42, 355 yards, 3 TD
- CAR – Sam Darnold – 15/22, 250 yards, TD

**Top rushers**

- DET – Jared Goff – 3 rushes, 15 yards
- CAR – D'Onta Foreman – 21 rushes, 165 yards, TD

**Top receivers**

- DET – D. J. Chark – 4 receptions, 108 yards
- CAR – D. J. Moore – 5 receptions, 83 yards, TD

In week 16, the Lions visited the Carolina Panthers on Christmas Eve. The Panthers opened the scoring in the first quarter via a seven-yard touchdown run from Raheem Blackshear. The Lions responded with a three-yard touchdown pass from Jared Goff to Shane Zylstra to tie the game. The Panthers scored 17 points in the second quarter via a three-yard touchdown run from Sam Darnold, a four-yard touchdown run from D'Onta Foreman and a 37-yard field goal by Eddy Piñeiro, which made the score 24–7 in favor of Carolina at half-time. The teams exchanged touchdowns in the third quarter, first a five-yard touchdown pass from Darnold to D. J. Moore for the Panthers, then a seven-yard touchdown pass from Goff to Zylstra and a failed two-point conversion attempt for the Lions. The Panthers scored six points in the fourth quarter via two field goals by Piñeiro from 40-yards, and 36-yards, respectively. The Lions scored 10 points in the quarter via a one-yard touchdown pass from Goff to Zylstra and a 34-yard field goal by Michael Badgley, making the final score 37–23 in favor of Carolina. The game time temperature of 20 °F (−7 °C) was the coldest ever at Bank of America Stadium.

==== Week 17: vs. Chicago Bears ====
Week 17: Chicago Bears at Detroit Lions – Game summary

Quarter	1	2	3	4	Total
Bears	10	0	0	0	**10**
**Lions**	7	17	14	3	**41**

at Ford Field, Detroit, Michigan

- Date: January 1
- Game time: 1:00 p.m. EST
- Game weather: None (indoor stadium)
- Game attendance: 66,169
- Referee: Adrian Hill
- TV announcers (Fox): Kenny Albert, Jonathan Vilma and Shannon Spake
- Recap, Game Book

Game information

**First quarter**

- CHI – Cole Kmet 13-yard pass from Justin Fields (Cairo Santos kick), 10:54. Bears 7–0. **Drive: 9 plays, 75 yards, 4:06.**
- DET – Brock Wright 2-yard pass from Jared Goff (Michael Badgley kick), 6:45. Tied 7–7. **Drive: 9 plays, 75 yards, 4:09.**
- CHI – Cairo Santos 23-yard field goal, 2:26. Bears 10–7. **Drive: 7 plays, 70 yards, 4:19.**

**Second quarter**

- DET – D'Andre Swift 17-yard run (Michael Badgley kick), 14:24. Lions 14–10. **Drive: 6 plays, 75 yards, 3:02.**
- DET – Brock Wright 9-yard pass from Jared Goff (Michael Badgley kick), 4:16. Lions 21–10. **Drive: 9 plays, 63 yards, 5:04.**
- DET – Michael Badgley 23-yard field goal, 0:17. Lions 24–10. **Drive: 8 plays, 46 yards, 2:33.**

**Third quarter**

- DET – Jamaal Williams 2-yard run (Michael Badgley kick), 11:38. Lions 31–10. **Drive: 6 plays, 75 yards, 3:22.**
- DET – D'Andre Swift 21-yard pass from Jared Goff (Michael Badgley kick), 6:36. Lions 38–10. **Drive: 7 plays, 92 yards, 3:56.**

**Fourth quarter**

- DET – Michael Badgley 41-yard field goal, 2:40. Lions 41–10. **Drive: 5 plays, 47 yards, 2:31.**

**Top passers**

- CHI – Justin Fields – 7/21, 75 yards, TD, INT
- DET – Jared Goff – 21/29, 255 yards, 3 TD

**Top rushers**

- CHI – Justin Fields – 10 rushes, 132 yards
- DET – Jamaal Williams – 22 rushes, 144 yards, TD

**Top receivers**

- CHI – Cole Kmet – 2 receptions, 27 yards, TD
- DET – Amon-Ra St. Brown – 4 receptions, 62 yards

In week 17, the Lions hosted their divisional rival, the Chicago Bears, in a New Year's Day rematch of week 10. The Bears opened the scoring in the first quarter via a 13-yard touchdown pass from Justin Fields to Cole Kmet. The Lions responded with a two-yard touchdown pass from Jared Goff to Brock Wright to tie the game. The Bears regained the lead via a 23-yard field goal by Cairo Santos. The Lions scored 17 unanswered points in the second quarter via a 17-yard touchdown run from D'Andre Swift, a nine-yard touchdown pass from Goff to Wright and a 23-yard field goal by Michael Badgley, which made the score 24–10 in favor of Detroit at half-time. The Bears were held scoreless in the second half. The Lions scored 14 points in the third quarter via a two-yard touchdown run from Jamaal Williams and a 21-yard touchdown pass from Goff to Swift. The Lions scored the only points of the fourth quarter via a 41-yard field goal by Badgley, making the final score 41–10 in favor of Detroit. The Lions swept the Bears for the first time since 2017.

==== Week 18: at Green Bay Packers ====
Week 18: Detroit Lions at Green Bay Packers – Game summary

Quarter	1	2	3	4	Total
**Lions**	3	3	7	7	**20**
Packers	6	3	7	0	**16**

at Lambeau Field, Green Bay, Wisconsin

- Date: January 8
- Game time: 8:20 p.m. EST/7:20 p.m. CST
- Game weather: Cloudy, 21 °F (−6 °C)
- Game attendance: 78,191
- Referee: Brad Rogers
- TV announcers (NBC): Mike Tirico, Cris Collinsworth and Melissa Stark
- Recap, Game Book

Game information

**First quarter**

- GB – Mason Crosby 22-yard field goal, 11:21. Packers 3–0. **Drive: 7 plays, 75 yards, 3:39.**
- DET – Michael Badgley 37-yard field goal, 7:00. Tied 3–3. **Drive: 5 plays, 12 yards, 1:32.**
- GB – Mason Crosby 49-yard field goal, 1:54. Packers 6–3. **Drive: 8 plays, 36 yards, 5:06.**

**Second quarter**

- GB – Mason Crosby 48-yard field goal, 12:56. Packers 9–3. **Drive: 7 plays, 25 yards, 2:21.**
- DET – Michael Badgley 33-yard field goal, 0:00. Packers 9–6. **Drive: 10 plays, 70 yards, 1:16.**

**Third quarter**

- DET – Jamaal Williams 1-yard run (Michael Badgley kick), 8:05. Lions 13–9. **Drive: 3 plays, 57 yards, 1:27.**
- GB – Allen Lazard 13-yard pass from Aaron Rodgers (Mason Crosby kick), 3:17. Packers 16–13. **Drive: 9 plays, 83 yards, 4:48.**

**Fourth quarter**

- DET – Jamaal Williams 1-yard run (Michael Badgley kick), 5:55. Lions 20–16. **Drive: 13 plays, 75 yards, 8:03.**

**Top passers**

- DET – Jared Goff – 23/34, 224 yards
- GB – Aaron Rodgers – 17/27, 205 yards, TD, INT

**Top rushers**

- DET – Jamaal Williams – 16 rushes, 72 yards, 2 TD
- GB – Aaron Jones – 12 rushes, 48 yards

**Top receivers**

- DET – Kalif Raymond – 4 receptions, 66 yards
- GB – Christian Watson – 5 receptions, 104 yards

To finish the season, in week 18, the Lions visited their divisional rival, the Green Bay Packers, in a rematch of week 9. The Packers opened the scoring in the first quarter via a 22-yard field goal by Mason Crosby. The Lions responded with a 37-yard field goal by Michael Badgley to tie the game. The Packers regained the lead via a 49-yard field goal by Crosby. The Packers extended their lead in the second quarter via a 48-yard field goal by Crosby. The Lions responded with a 33-yard field goal by Badgley as time expired in the half, which made the score 9–6 in favor of Green Bay at half-time. The Lions took their first lead of the game in the third quarter via a one-yard touchdown run from Jamaal Williams. The Packers responded with a 13-yard touchdown pass from Aaron Rodgers to Allen Lazard to regain the lead. The Lions scored the only points of the fourth quarter via a one-yard touchdown run from Williams, making the final score 20–16 in favor of Detroit. With the win, the Lions swept the Packers for the first time since 2018 and eliminated them from playoff contention. (The Lions had already been eliminated from the playoffs due to the Seattle Seahawks win earlier in the day.) With two rushing touchdowns in the game, Williams set the Lions' single-season touchdown record with 17, surpassing the previous record of 16 set by Barry Sanders in 1991. This would be the last season the Lions failed to qualify for the playoffs until 2025.

=== Standings ===
==== Division ====
NFC North
	W	L	T	PCT	DIV	CONF	PF	PA	STK
^{(3)} Minnesota Vikings	13	4	0	.765	4–2	8–4	424	427	W1
Detroit Lions	9	8	0	.529	5–1	7–5	453	427	W2
Green Bay Packers	8	9	0	.471	3–3	6–6	370	371	L1
Chicago Bears	3	14	0	.176	0–6	1–11	326	463	L10

==== Conference ====
NFC
#	Team	Division	W	L	T	PCT	DIV	CONF	SOS	SOV	STK
**Division leaders**
1	Philadelphia Eagles	East	14	3	0	.824	4–2	9–3	.474	.460	W1
2 (Note: San Francisco claimed the No. 2 seed over Minnesota based on conference record (10–2 vs. 8–4).)	San Francisco 49ers	West	13	4	0	.765	6–0	10–2	.417	.414	W10
3	Minnesota Vikings	North	13	4	0	.765	4–2	8–4	.474	.425	W1
4	Tampa Bay Buccaneers	South	8	9	0	.471	4–2	8–4	.503	.426	L1
**Wild cards**
5	Dallas Cowboys	East	12	5	0	.706	4–2	8–4	.507	.485	L1
6	New York Giants	East	9	7	1	.559	1–4–1	4–7–1	.526	.395	L1
7 (Note: Seattle finished ahead of Detroit based on head-to-head victory, claiming the 7th and final playoff spot.)	Seattle Seahawks	West	9	8	0	.529	4–2	6–6	.462	.382	W2
**Did not qualify for the postseason**
8	Detroit Lions	North	9	8	0	.529	5–1	7–5	.535	.451	W2
9	Washington Commanders	East	8	8	1	.500	2–3–1	5–6–1	.536	.449	W1
10	Green Bay Packers	North	8	9	0	.471	3–3	6–6	.524	.449	L1
11 (Note: Carolina finished ahead of New Orleans and Atlanta based on head-to-head record (3–1 vs. 2–2/1–3).)	Carolina Panthers	South	7	10	0	.412	4–2	6–6	.474	.437	W1
12 (Note: New Orleans finished ahead of Atlanta based on head-to-head sweep.)	New Orleans Saints	South	7	10	0	.412	2–4	5–7	.507	.462	L1
13	Atlanta Falcons	South	7	10	0	.412	2–4	6–6	.467	.429	W2
14	Los Angeles Rams	West	5	12	0	.294	1–5	3–9	.517	.341	L2
15	Arizona Cardinals	West	4	13	0	.235	1–5	3–9	.529	.368	L7
16	Chicago Bears	North	3	14	0	.176	0–6	1–11	.571	.480	L10
**Tiebreakers** (Note: When breaking ties for three or more teams under the NFL's rules, they are first broken within divisions, then comparing only the highest-ranked remaining team from each division.)

== Awards and honors ==
Recipient	Award(s)
Amon-Ra St. Brown	Week 2; NFC Offensive Player of the Week
Jared Goff	Week 4; FedEx Air Player of the Week; Week 14; FedEx Air Player of the Week
Aidan Hutchinson	Week 11; NFC Defensive Player of the Week; November; NFL Defensive Rookie of the Month
Jamaal Williams	Week 11; FedEx Ground Player of the Week; Week 17; FedEx Ground Player of the Week
