= Trinity (comics) =

Trinity, in comics, may refer to:

- DC Comics comics and characters:
  - Trinity (comics character), a character created in 1990 and used in stories featuring the Teen Titans and Wonder Woman
  - Trinity (story arc), a 1993 crossover story arc that include a limited series and issues of Green Lantern vol. 3, Darkstars, and L.E.G.I.O.N.
  - Batman/Superman/Wonder Woman: Trinity, a 2002 limited series by Matt Wagner
  - Trinity (comic book), a 2008 weekly limited series written by Kurt Busiek, with art by Mark Bagley
  - Blue Trinity and Red Trinity, Soviet superspeedster teams created by Pyotr Orloff, featured in Flash and Suicide Squad
- Trinity (Team Tejas), an Azteca Productions superheroine and member of Team Tejas
- Trinity Blood, a light novel series and manga
- Trinity Angels, a 1997 series from Acclaim Comics
- Broken Trinity, a 2008 series from Image Comics
- Sister Trinity, a late nineteenth century, Old West avatar of Warrior Nun Areala

== See also ==
- Trinity (disambiguation)
