= Trindade =

Trindade (Portuguese for Trinity) may refer to:

== Places ==
=== Brazil ===
- Trindade, Rio de Janeiro
- Trindade, Goiás
- Trindade, Pernambuco
- Trindade, Florianópolis, Santa Catarina, Florianópolis, Santa Catarina
- Trindade (island), Espírito Santo

=== Portugal ===
- Trindade (Beja), a parish in the municipality of Beja
- Trindade (Vila Flor), a parish in the municipality of Vila Flor

=== São Tomé and Príncipe ===
- Trindade (São Tomé and Príncipe), a town and the capital of the Mé-Zóchi District

== People ==
- Armando Trindade (born 1927), Pakistani Catholic priest, 9th Bishop of Lahore
- Rui Manuel Trindade Jordão, (1952) Angola born Portuguese international footballer
- Manuel da Costa (footballer, born 1986) (1986) France born Portuguese footballer
- Camila Trindade (1989) Brazilian model
- Joyce Trindade (born 1996), Brazilian politician

== Other uses ==
- Trindade Atlético Clube, a Brazilian football (soccer) club
- Trindade (brand), a brand of bottled water from Cape Verde

== See also ==
- Trindade station (disambiguation)
- Trinidad (disambiguation)
