= Trinity Island (disambiguation) =

Trinity Island or Trinity Islands may refer to:

- Trinity Island, Palmer Archipelago, Antarctica
- Trinity Island, Willis Islands, South Georgia
- Trinity Islands (Alaska), an uninhabited island group consisting of the two larger islands Sitkinak and Tugidak, as well as several smaller islands, lying off Kodiak Island and belonging to Kodiak Island Borough, U.S.
- Trinity Islands (Nunavut), an uninhabited island group offshore Baffin Island, Canada
- Trinity Islands, Manchester, a skyscraper development in Manchester, England

== See also ==
- Trindade and Martim Vaz (Trinity and Martim Vaz), archipelago in Brazil
