= Trindade station =

Trindade station may refer to:

- Trindade station (Porto Metro), a light rail station on the Porto Metro in the city of Porto, Portugal
- Porto-Trindade railway station, a former railway terminus in the city of Porto, Portugal

== See also ==
- Trindade (disambiguation)
- Trinidad station (disambiguation)
