= Trinitaria =

Trinitaria may refer to:

- La Trinitaria, Chiapas, a town and one of the 119 municipalities of Chiapas, Mexico
- La Trinitaria (Dominican Republic), a revolutionary group which fought for independence of the Dominican Republic
- Trinitarios, a Hispanic-American gang
- The Spanish word for the Trinity, a central concept in Christian theology

== See also ==
- Trinity (disambiguation)
