= Savitar (character) =

DC Comics supervillain

- Savitar as depicted in The Flash Secret Files & Origins #1 (November 1997). Art by Kenny Martinez (pencils), Abigal Roddriguez (inks), and Patrick Martin (colors).

Publication information
- Publisher: DC Comics
- First appearance: The Flash (vol. 2) #108 (December 1995)
- Created by: Mark Waid (writer); Oscar Jimenez (artist)

In-story information
- Alter ego: Unknown
- Species: Metahuman
- Abilities: Superhuman speed, stamina, agility, reflexes, and senses; Electricity and lightning manipulation; Accelerated healing; Force field; Time travel

Savitar (/sævitɑːr/) is a supervillain appearing in comic books published by DC Comics. An immensely powerful speedster who leads a cult dedicated to the Speed Force, he is an enemy of the Flash and he has battled Wally West, Jay Garrick, and Barry Allen.

The character has been adapted from the comics into various forms of media.

== Publication history ==
Savitar first appeared in The Flash (vol. 2) #108 (December 1995), and was created by Mark Waid and Oscar Jimenez.

== Fictional character biography ==
Savitar was originally an unnamed pilot for a third-world nation that was to test a supersonic fighter jet during the Cold War. As he reached top speed, his plane was struck by what appeared to be lightning and he went down in hostile territory. Discovering he could defeat the enemy by moving at super-speed, he became obsessed, naming himself after the Hindu deity Savitr and dedicating his life to unlocking the secrets of his powers. As he studied, Savitar discovered new powers that no other living speedster has mastered. He can protect himself in a null-inertia force field, give speed and kinetic energy to objects or people, even those in a "rest state", and he could also heal his own injuries almost instantly.

Savitar's obsession gains followers, and he becomes the leader of a cult. In search of more knowledge, he seeks out the only super-speed hero operating at the time: Johnny Quick. This encounter turns into a battle, the tide of which was turned with Max Mercury's arrival leading Savitar toward the Speed Force, but causing him to bounce off, both speedsters being thrown forward in time. Emerging from the timestream before Savitar, Mercury becomes a mentor to the Flash family's various members and other speedsters, secretly preparing them for Savitar's return.

Reappearing decades later, Savitar learns that his cult had grown in his absence, awaiting his return. He recruits former Blue Trinity member Lady Flash (Christina Alexandrova) and discovers a way to use Alexandrova's speed to divert energy from the Speed Force to an army of ninjas. He then seeks to eliminate the competition: Wally West, Impulse, Jay Garrick, Johnny Quick, Jesse Quick, XS, and Mercury.

Wally's connection to the Speed Force prevents Savitar from stealing his speed, and a coalition of speedsters foil his plans. Hell-bent on destroying Earth in retribution, Savitar leads Wally on a worldwide race of destruction until Wally allows him to enter the Speed Force once more.

In The Flash: Rebirth, Savitar escapes from the Speed Force, but is killed by Barry Allen, who Professor Zoom gave the ability to kill other speedsters with a single touch. In Infinite Frontier, it is revealed that Savitar survived and was returned to the Speed Force, with its attempts to expel him causing an explosion that destroyed the Sanctuary center during Heroes in Crisis.

== Powers and abilities ==
Savitar can move at super-speed, and is able to lend or steal speed from moving objects. He has accelerated healing due to increased metabolism and can generate a null Inertia force field.

== In other media ==
=== Television ===
Savitar wearing his armor in a promotional image of The Flash.

A loose interpretation of Savitar appears in The Flash, voiced by Tobin Bell while Andre Tricoteux portrayed his armored form. This version is a time remnant doppelgänger of Barry Allen who was driven to insanity. Originally created in the future to help imprison Savitar in the Speed Force, the time remnant travels back in time to create his own myth, recruit Doctor Alchemy to serve as his proxy, and escape his imprisonment, creating a time loop in the process.

=== Video games ===
- Savitar appears as a character summon in Scribblenauts Unmasked: A DC Comics Adventure.
- Savitar appears as a playable character in DC Legends.
