= Trinity (given name) =

Feminine name

- The Holy Trinity by Andrés López

Origin
- Origin: English
- Meaning: “Trinity”

Other names
- See also: Trini, Trinidad.

Trinity is a given name of recent English origin that is derived from the Christian doctrine of the Trinity. It became popular starting in 1999 because of the character Trinity in The Matrix movies.

In the United States, it rose in popularity for girls in the 1990s, peaking as the 48th most popular feminine name in 2004-2005, down to the 310th most popular in 2022. In other English-speaking countries, it rose in usage in 2000.

== Men ==
- Trinity Benson (born 1997), American football player
- Trinity Gray (born 1978), American middle-distance runner

== Women ==
- Trinity Baptiste (born 1998), American basketball player
- Trinity Bliss (born 2009), American actress and singer
- Trinity Fatu (born 1987), known by the ring names Naomi and Trinity, American professional wrestler and dancer
- Trinity Likins (born 2006), Canadian actress
- Trinity Lowthian (born 2002), Canadian wheelchair fencer
- Trinity Rodman (born 2002), American professional soccer player
- Trinity Smith (born 2004), Jersey cricketer
- Trinity Thomas (born 2001), American artistic gymnast

== See also ==
- Trinity (wrestler) (Stephanie Finochio, born 1971), American stuntwoman, actress, and former professional wrestler and valet
- Trinity K. Bonet (Joshua Jamal Jones, born 1991), American drag queen, performer, celebrity impersonator, actor and singer
- Trinity the Tuck (Ryan A. Taylor, born 1985), American drag queen and recording artist
