= Trinity Foundation =

Trinity Foundation may refer to:

- Trinity Foundation (Dallas) of Dallas, Texas, a non-denominational Christian organization most notable for being a televangelism watchdog group and publisher of The Door magazine
- Trinity Foundation, an evangelical organization founded by Mark Rutland, now known as Global Servants

== See also ==
- Trinity (disambiguation)
