= Red Trinity =

- Drawn by Jackson Guice in The Flash (vol. 2) #7.

Publication information
- Publisher: DC Comics
- First appearance: The Flash (vol. 2) #6 (November 1987)
- Created by: Mike Baron (writer); Jackson Guice (artist)

In-story information
- Member(s): Anatole; Bebeck; Cassiopeia

Red Trinity (Russian: Красная Троица, romanized: Krasnaya Troitsa, a.k.a. Kapitalist Kouriers) is a fictional DC Comics Russian superteam introduced in Flash (vol. 2) #6 (November 1987). They were created by Mike Baron and Jackson Guice.

== Fictional history ==
Doctor Pytor Orloff is a prominent Russian scientist at the Puleski Institute in Siberia. Orloff was able to inflict super-speed on laboratory subjects using steroids and cybernetic implants, in conjunction with specialized gene therapy. Orloff decided to create Red Trinity after conquering the adverse side effects which afflicted his prototype team, Blue Trinity.

While the members of Blue Trinity were extremely powerful, they were also emotionally unstable, slow witted, and prone to violence. Currently known only as Anatole, Bebeck and Cassiopeia, the trio became super-powered operatives in the employ of the Russian army.

Red Trinity came into conflict with Blue Trinity after they helped Wally West (Flash) smuggle Doctor Orloff out of Russia, because his expertise was needed to save the life of Doctor Jerry McGee (Speed Demon) in America. Flash and Red Trinity fight and defeat Blue Trinity at the Finnish border. As a result of their trip, Red Trinity decided to make the United States their home. They started up a super-powered intercontinental messenger service called "Kapitalist Kourier Service, Inc."

Later Lady Flash (Christina Alexandrova of Blue Trinity) and the three Kapitalist Kouriers were asked to capture a rogue Soviet terrorist named Proletariat who opposed glasnost. Together they prevent Proletariat from detonating a concealed bomb.

During the War of the Gods intracompany crossover, the combined forces of Flash, Lady Flash, the Kapitalist Kouriers and Chunk ended a battle between the Roman god Mercury and the Greek god Hermes who were locked in a competition to prove who was faster, a competition which put all Keystone City in danger.

The big man named Cassiopeia died due to Savitar absorbing the speed from all of the world's super-speedsters in The Flash (vol. 2) #108, while Cassiopeia was running up the side of a building; he then fell to his death.

== Membership ==
- Anatole - a medium-sized cocky young man, he wanted to defect.
- Bebeck - a woman, and the head of Kapitalist Kouriers. She also wanted to defect.
- Cassiopeia - a large man, initially unwilling to defect but he gave in to the other two, now deceased.

== See also ==
- List of Russian superheroes
