= Brock Wright =

American football player (born 1998)

No. 89 – Detroit Lions
- Position: Tight end / Fullback
- Roster status: Active

Personal information
- Born: November 27, 1998 (age 27); Cypress, Texas, U.S.
- Listed height: 6 ft 5 in (1.96 m)
- Listed weight: 254 lb (115 kg)

Career information
- High school: Cy-Fair (Cypress)
- College: Notre Dame (2017–2020)
- NFL draft: 2021: undrafted

Career history
- Detroit Lions (2021–present)

Career NFL statistics as of Week 5, 2026
- Receptions: 75
- Receiving yards: 663
- Receiving touchdowns: 11
- Stats at Pro Football Reference

Brock Joseph Wright (born November 27, 1998) is an American professional football tight end and fullback for the Detroit Lions of the National Football League (NFL). He played college football for the Notre Dame Fighting Irish.

== College career ==
Wright played college football at the University of Notre Dame, where he appeared in 48 games with 11 starts. He had seven receptions for 78 yards and one touchdown during his career with the Fighting Irish.

== Professional career ==
Pre-draft measurables
Height	Weight	Arm length	Hand span	Wingspan	40-yard dash	10-yard split	20-yard split	20-yard shuttle	Three-cone drill	Vertical jump	Broad jump	Bench press
6 ft 4 1/2 in (1.94 m)	257 lb (117 kg)	32 3/8 in (0.82 m)	10 in (0.25 m)	6 ft 5 1/8 in (1.96 m)	4.66 s	1.60 s	2.64 s	4.25 s	7.31 s	31.5 in (0.80 m)	9 ft 10 in (3.00 m)	26 reps
All values from Pro Day

On May 1, 2021, Wright signed with the Detroit Lions as an undrafted free agent after the 2021 NFL draft. On October 23, Wright was activated from the practice squad by the Lions for the team's week 7 game against the Los Angeles Rams. He was signed to the active roster on November 8. On December 5, Wright scored his first NFL touchdown against the Minnesota Vikings on a 23-yard pass from Jared Goff.

On December 18, 2022, in a Week 15 game at the New York Jets, Wright scored the go-ahead touchdown on a 51-yard pass from Goff on 4th down and inches with 1:49 remaining in the game. The Lions held on for the 20–17 win — improving their record to 7–7 and keeping their playoff hopes alive in the NFC.

As a restricted free agent in 2024, the San Francisco 49ers signed Wright to a three-year, $12 million offer sheet. Five days later, the Lions matched the offer, and Wright re-signed with Detroit on April 3, 2024.

In 2025, Wright made 11 appearances (eight starts) for the Lions, recording 14 receptions for 108 yards and two touchdowns. On December 4, 2025, Wright was placed on injured reserve due to a neck injury.

== Career statistics ==
=== NFL ===
Year	Team	Games		Receiving				
Year	Team	GP	GS	Rec	Yds	Avg	Lng	TD
2021	DET	10	5	12	117	9.8	36	2
2022	DET	17	10	18	216	12.0	51	4
2023	DET	14	4	13	91	7.0	25	1
2024	DET	17	8	13	100	7.7	16	2
2025	DET	11	8	14	108	7.7	20	2
2026	DET	5	3	5	31	6.2	11	0
Career		74	38	75	663	8.8	51	11

=== College ===
Year	Team	Games		Receiving				
Year	Team	GP	GS	Rec	Yds	Avg	Lng	TD
2017	Notre Dame	11	0	0	0	0.0	0	0
2018	Notre Dame	12	1	2	12	6.0	9	1
2019	Notre Dame	13	3	2	45	22.5	40	0
2020	Notre Dame	12	7	3	21	7.0	11	0
Career		48	11	7	78	11.1	40	1
