= Michael Badgley =

American football player (born 1995)

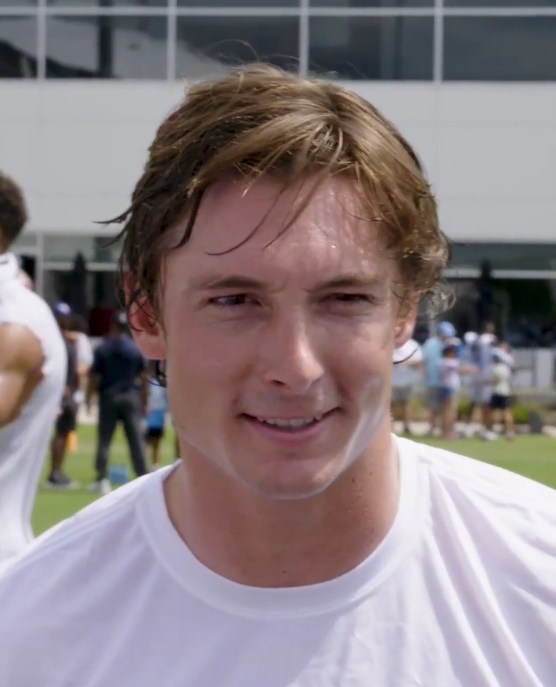
- Badgley with the Tennessee Titans in 2023

Profile
- Position: Placekicker

Personal information
- Born: July 28, 1995 (age 31); Summit, New Jersey, U.S.
- Listed height: 5 ft 10 in (1.78 m)
- Listed weight: 188 lb (85 kg)

Career information
- High school: Summit
- College: Miami (FL) (2014–2017)
- NFL draft: 2018: undrafted

Career history
- Indianapolis Colts (2018)*; Los Angeles Chargers (2018–2020); Tennessee Titans (2021); Indianapolis Colts (2021); Chicago Bears (2022); Detroit Lions (2022); Washington Commanders (2023)*; Tennessee Titans (2023)*; Detroit Lions (2023–2024); Indianapolis Colts (2025); Buffalo Bills (2025)
- * Offseason or practice squad member only

Awards and highlights
- First-team All-ACC (2017)

Career NFL statistics as of 2025
- Field goals made: 109
- Field goals attempted: 131
- Field goal %: 83.2%
- Extra points made: 188
- Extra points attempted: 200
- Extra point %: 94%
- Points: 515
- Longest field goal: 59
- Touchbacks: 6
- Stats at Pro Football Reference

Michael Badgley (badge-LEE; born July 28, 1995), nicknamed "the Money Badger", is an American professional football placekicker. He played college football for the Miami Hurricanes and was signed as an undrafted free agent by the Indianapolis Colts in 2018. Badgley has also played for the Los Angeles Chargers, Tennessee Titans, Chicago Bears, Detroit Lions, and Buffalo Bills.

== Early life ==
Badgley was born on July 28, 1995, in Summit, New Jersey. He attended Summit High School, where he played hockey, lacrosse, and football. Badgley won at least one state championship in every sport he played in high school including consecutive group NJSIAA state lacrosse championships in 2010-2011 and a NJSIAA state hockey championship at the Prudential Center in 2012. Badgley had planned to play collegiate lacrosse and follow his older brother's footsteps until a coach convinced him that he could play football at the Division I level. Michael's older brother, Peter Badgley, is a former Division I lacrosse goalie at Providence College competing in the Big East Conference where he was selected first-team and Big East Goalie of the year in 2015.

=== Summit High School ===
In addition to kicking for Summit, Michael started on both sides of the ball at DB and RB, he returned kicks, punts and filled in at QB due to injuries to starting QB and completed 18 of 33 passes with 7 TD passes for 448 yards. He set 12 Summit HS football records for the Summit Hilltoppers, including longest field goal of 49 yards, most kicking points in season with 84, most consecutive PATs with 67, most kicking points in career with 202. Scored in record 34 consecutive games for Summit with career total of 389 points, second to Willie Wilson’s (Kansas City Royals) 401 career all-time points scored for Summit, including record 181 total points scored in senior season. Career totals include: 3,198 total all-purpose yards, 1,320 rushing yards, 607 receiving yards, 1,271 return yards. Scored 31 TDs including 17 rushing, seven receiving, two by kickoff returns, four by punt returns and one pick-6. Varsity team captain, leading Summit to 12–0 season and N.J. State Football Championship at MetLife Stadium in 2012 playing for head coach John Liberato. Michael was selected as the Star-Ledger Player of the Year in Union County in 2012 and the Maxwell Football Club’s Top 50 players in NJ.

=== Fork Union Military Academy ===
After Summit he attended Fork Union Military Academy’s post-graduate program playing for head coach Col. John Shuman. At FUMA he was on the Dean's list and was No. 1 Ranked kicker in 247Sports Composite Rankings. His longest field goal at Fork Union Military Academy was 58 yards. Fork Union Military Academy School also produced former NFL players Vinny Testaverde and Eddie George.

== College career ==
Badgley attended and played college football at the University of Miami in Coral Gables, Florida. Badgley is Miami's all-time leading scorer and was a 2017 all-ACC, first teamer. Badgley was named team captain, first-team All-ACC, Walter Kichefski Award recipient and U of Miami Special Teams MVP in 2017. Michael was the Miami Hurricanes starting kicker as a true freshman in 2014 through his senior season in 2017, leaving Miami with six school records including the all-time leading scorer at The U. After graduating, Michael was invited to the Reese's Senior Bowl and NFL Combine. Badgley left Miami holding career records in field goals (77) and point scored (403).

=== College statistics ===
Year	G	XPM	XPA	XP%	FGM	FGA	FG%	Pts
2014	11	34	38	89.5	14	18	77.8	76
2015	12	40	40	100.0	25	30	83.3	115
2016	13	53	55	96.4	21	26	80.8	116
2017	13	45	46	97.8	17	23	73.9	96
Career	49	172	179	96.1	77	97	79.4	403

== Professional career ==
Pre-draft measurables
Height	Weight	Arm length	Hand span	Wingspan	40-yard dash	10-yard split	20-yard split	Broad jump
5 ft 9 3/4 in (1.77 m)	183 lb (83 kg)	29 in (0.74 m)	8 3/4 in (0.22 m)	5 ft 10 5/8 in (1.79 m)	4.89 s	1.78 s	2.85 s	9 ft 3 in (2.82 m)
All values from NFL Combine/Pro Day

=== Indianapolis Colts (first stint) ===
After not being selected in the 2018 NFL draft, Badgley signed with the Indianapolis Colts as an undrafted free agent. Badgley worked with kicker Adam Vinatieri during the pre-season with the Colts. Vinatieri said "He's a good kid, and he's a really good kicker as well, He's got a nice leg and he's doing a good job picking my brain. We joke around that he's always kind of in my back pocket all the time, and rightfully so." The Colts ended up releasing Badgley before the start of the regular season in favor of Adam Vinatieri, but not before he had connected on all five of his field goal attempts in the preseason, with a long of 51 yards. On September 1, 2018, Badgley was waived by the Colts as part of the final roster cuts.

=== Los Angeles Chargers ===
Badgley was signed by the Los Angeles Chargers on October 11, 2018. In Week 6, he made his NFL debut against the Cleveland Browns. In the 38–14 victory, he converted all five extra point attempts and his one field goal attempt. In the next game, a 20–19 victory over the Tennessee Titans, he converted two field goal attempts and two extra point attempts. In Week 13, against the Pittsburgh Steelers on Sunday Night Football, Badgley missed a 52-yard try on the game's first possession. He rebounded from it to hit both his extra point tries, and then, after missing one attempt and having one blocked—both negated by defensive offside penalties—he hit the game-winner from 29 yards out to give the Chargers a 33–30 win. The following week against Cincinnati, Badgley hit four field goals from 59, 31, 32, and 46 yards during a 26–21 win. The 59-yarder set a Chargers franchise record for longest field goal. He was named AFC Special Teams Player of the Week for his performance. During the 2018 AFC Wildcard matchup against the Baltimore Ravens, Badgley went four-for-four from field goal range in the first half, becoming only the third kicker to do so. The Chargers went on to beat the Ravens with a final score of 23–17, he rewrote the record books with the most field goals (five) and points (15) in a postseason game in Chargers history. Badgley was the league's top special teams rookie for the 2018 season.

At the completion of the 2020 season, his first complete season, and third season overall with the Chargers, Badgley became the 19th leading scorer in team history with a total of 238 points scored in regular season games played for the Chargers.

Badgley was waived by the Chargers on August 31, 2021.

=== Tennessee Titans (first stint) ===
On September 10, 2021, Badgley was signed to the Titans' practice squad. On September 13, Badgley was waived by the Titans.

=== Indianapolis Colts (second stint) ===
On October 14, 2021, Badgley signed with the Colts practice squad. On October 16, he was elevated to the active roster following an injury to starting kicker Rodrigo Blankenship, and officially signed to the roster after making all five of his kicks in Week 6. The Colts would be eliminated from the playoffs following a surprising 26-11 Week 18 defeat against the Jacksonville Jaguars and the Pittsburgh Steelers beating the Baltimore Ravens later in the day. Badgley finished the season making 18 of 21 field goals and 39 of 39 extra points.

=== Chicago Bears ===
On October 1, 2022, the Chicago Bears signed Badgley to their practice squad. He was elevated to the active roster for the team's game against the New York Giants due to kicker Cairo Santos being questionable for personal reasons. He made all four field goals he attempted during the game. He was released two days later.

=== Detroit Lions (first stint) ===
On October 5, 2022, Badgley was signed to the Detroit Lions practice squad. He was promoted to the active roster on October 29. He finished the season by making 24 of 28 (85.7 pct.) field goals attempts and was a perfect 33 of 33 (100 pct.) on his extra point attempts. He was named NFC Special Teams Player of the Week in Week 13 after scoring 16 points on four extra points and four field goals in a 40-14 win over the Jacksonville Jaguars. He finished the season by making 24 of 28 (85.7 pct.) field goals attempts and was a perfect 33 of 33 (100 pct.) He was one of six Lions to win an NFC player of the week award.

Badgley was released on July 20, 2023.

=== Washington Commanders ===
On July 25, 2023, the Commanders signed Badgley. On August 20, 2023, he was released.

=== Tennessee Titans (second stint) ===
On August 22, 2023, the Titans signed Badgley. He was released on August 27, 2023.

=== Detroit Lions (second stint) ===
On August 30, 2023, Badgley was signed to the practice squad of the Lions. On December 16, Badgley was elevated from the practice squad for the game against the Denver Broncos after struggles from Lions kicker Riley Patterson. He was signed to the active roster on December 29. Badgley and the Lions advanced to the 2023 NFC Championship against the San Francisco 49ers. He hit a 54-yard game deciding field goal in the NFC Wild Card Round, securing a 24–23 victory against the Los Angeles Rams to advance to the NFC Divisional Round against the Tampa Bay Buccaneers. He finished the post-season going a perfect 3-of-3 on field goal attempts and 11-of-11 on his extra point attempts.

On February 22, 2024, Badgley re-signed with the Lions. On July 26, Badgley suffered a torn hamstring; he was subsequently placed on injured reserve after it was announced he would miss the entire 2024 season. Without Badgley, the Lions went on to be the NFC's top seed with a record of 15–2.

=== Indianapolis Colts (third stint) ===
On October 7, 2025, Badgley was signed to the Indianapolis Colts' active roster following a season-ending injury to Spencer Shrader. On December 2, Badgley was waived by the Colts, following a crucial PAT miss in Week 13 against the Houston Texans.

=== Buffalo Bills ===
On December 16, 2025, Badgley was signed to the Buffalo Bills' practice squad, following an injury to Matt Prater. On December 20, Badgley was elevated from the practice squad for the team's game against the Cleveland Browns. In the game, Badgley missed a PAT, but converted his lone field goal attempt from 41 yards, in the 23–20 win. The following week against the Philadelphia Eagles, Badgley missed another PAT after the Bills scored their first touchdown of the game. Following another touchdown that cut the deficit to 13–12 in favor of Philadelphia, the Bills opted to go for two points and the win instead of having Badgley kick a potential game-tying PAT, but failed, resulting in a loss. Badgley was subsequently released on December 29.

== NFL career statistics ==
Year	Team	GP	Field goals				Extra points			Points
Year	Team	GP	FGA	FGM	Lng	Pct	XPA	XPM	Pct	Points
2018	LAC	10	16	15	59	93.8	28	27	96.4	72
2019	LAC	8	16	13	49	81.3	19	19	100.0	58
2020	LAC	16	33	24	48	72.7	39	36	92.3	108
2021	TEN	1	1	0	0	0.0	2	1	50.0	1
2021	IND	12	21	18	46	85.7	39	39	100.0	93
2022	CHI	1	4	4	40	100.0	0	0	0.0	12
2022	DET	12	24	20	53	83.3	33	33	100.0	93
2023	DET	4	4	4	41	100.0	15	13	86.7	25
2024	DET	Did not play due to injury								
2025	IND	7	11	10	53	90.9	21	18	85.7	48
2025	BUF	2	1	1	41	100.0	4	2	50.0	5
Career		73	131	109	59	83.2	200	188	94.0	515

=== Records ===
Los Angeles Chargers franchise records:

- Longest field goal (59 yards, 2018, tied, with Cameron Dicker)
- Post-season field goals made (5, 2018)
