= Obinna Eze =

American football player (born 1998)

No. 68 – Cleveland Browns
- Position: Offensive tackle
- Roster status: Practice squad

Personal information
- Born: June 12, 1998 (age 28); Lagos, Nigeria
- Listed height: 6 ft 8 in (2.03 m)
- Listed weight: 325 lb (147 kg)

Career information
- High school: Davidson Academy (Nashville, Tennessee, U.S.)
- College: Memphis (2017–2020); TCU (2021)
- NFL draft: 2022: undrafted

Career history
- Detroit Lions (2022)*; Pittsburgh Steelers (2023)*; Michigan Panthers (2023)*; New York Jets (2023–2024)*; Miami Dolphins (2025); Cleveland Browns (2026–present)*
- * Offseason or practice squad member only
- Stats at Pro Football Reference

Obinna Eze (born June 12, 1998) is a Nigerian professional American football offensive tackle for the Cleveland Browns of the National Football League (NFL). He played college football for the Memphis Tigers and TCU Horned Frogs.

== Early life ==
Eze migrated to the United States in 2015. Initially a basketball player, he did not start playing football until arriving in the US.

== College career ==
Eze was a highly-ranked OT recruit, and received scholarship offers from many SEC schools. He eventually committed to Memphis prior to his senior year of high school.

== Professional career ==
Pre-draft measurables
Height	Weight	Arm length	Hand span	Wingspan	40-yard dash	10-yard split	20-yard split	20-yard shuttle	Three-cone drill	Vertical jump	Broad jump	Bench press
6 ft 6 1/2 in (1.99 m)	321 lb (146 kg)	36 1/8 in (0.92 m)	9 7/8 in (0.25 m)	7 ft 1 3/4 in (2.18 m)	5.17 s	1.79 s	3.01 s	5.00 s	8.01 s	27.5 in (0.70 m)	8 ft 8 in (2.64 m)	18 reps
All values from NFL Combine/Pro Day

=== Detroit Lions ===
Eze went undrafted in the 2022 NFL draft, but was signed on May 13, 2022 ahead of Detroit Lions training camp. His quest to make the 53-man roster, along with other players', was featured on the HBO television show Hard Knocks. During the 2022 preseason, though not starting, he appeared in 31 snaps against the Falcons, 22 snaps against the Colts, and 23 snaps against the Steelers.

Eze was waived on August 30, as part of final roster cuts, but signed to the practice squad the next day. He signed a reserve/future contract on January 9, 2023. He was waived on August 27, 2023.

=== Pittsburgh Steelers ===
On October 3, 2023, Eze signed with the practice squad of the Pittsburgh Steelers. He was released on October 24.

=== Michigan Panthers ===
On December 8, 2023, Eze signed with the Michigan Panthers of the United States Football League (USFL). He was released on December 12 to sign with an NFL team.

=== New York Jets ===
On December 13, 2023, Eze was signed to the New York Jets practice squad. He signed a reserve/future contract with the Jets on January 8, 2024.

On August 27, 2024, Eze was waived by the Jets and re-signed to the practice squad. He signed a reserve/future contract with New York on January 6, 2025. On July 22, Eze was released by the Jets.

=== Miami Dolphins ===
On July 24, 2025, Eze signed with the Miami Dolphins. He was placed on injured reserve on July 30.

=== Cleveland Browns ===
On September 15, 2026, Eze signed to the Cleveland Browns' practice squad.

== Personal life ==
Eze's parents live in Nigeria. He has four siblings. He is married to Yasmeen Eze.
