= Trinidad station =

Trinidad station may refer to:

- Trinidad station (Colorado), a railroad station in Trinidad, Colorado, USA
- Trinidad metro station, a metro station in Santiago, Chile

== See also ==
- Trindade station (disambiguation)
- Trinidad (disambiguation)
