= Shane Zylstra =

American football player (born 1996)

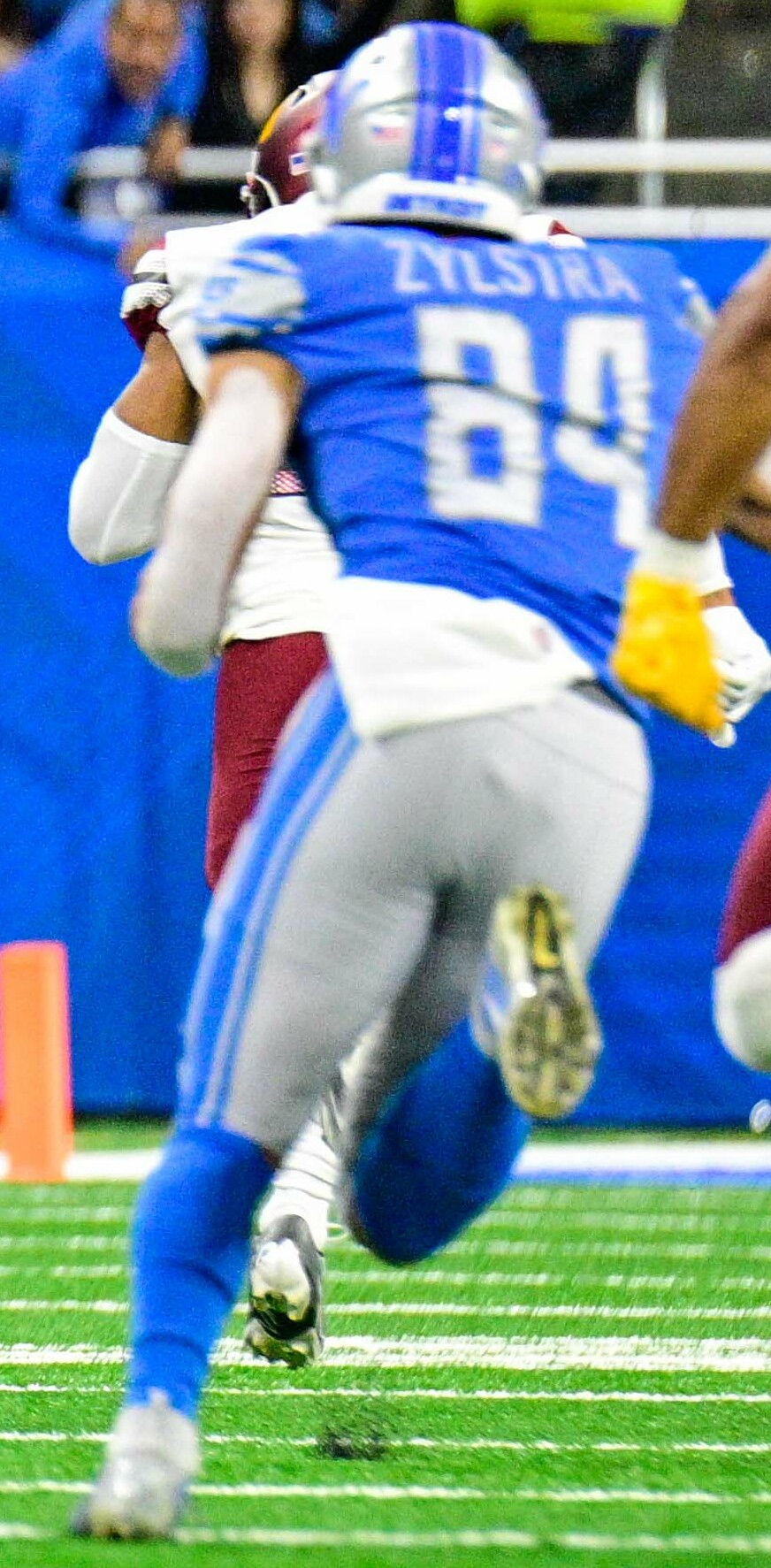
- Zylstra in 2022

Profile
- Position: Tight end

Personal information
- Born: November 16, 1996 (age 30); Spicer, Minnesota, U.S.
- Listed height: 6 ft 4 in (1.93 m)
- Listed weight: 244 lb (111 kg)

Career information
- High school: New London-Spicer (New London, Minnesota)
- College: Minnesota State (2015–2019)
- NFL draft: 2020: undrafted

Career history
- Minnesota Vikings (2021)*; Detroit Lions (2021–2025); Buffalo Bills (2026)*; New England Patriots (2026)*
- * Offseason or practice squad member only

Awards and highlights
- First-team All-American (2019); Second-team All-American (2018); NSIC Offensive Player of the Year (2017); 3x First-team All-NSIC (2017–2019)

Career NFL statistics as of 2025
- Receptions: 18
- Receiving yards: 136
- Receiving touchdowns: 4
- Stats at Pro Football Reference

Shane Zylstra (born November 16, 1996) is an American professional football tight end. He played college football for the Minnesota State Mavericks.

== College career ==
Zylstra was a member of the Minnesota State Mavericks for five seasons, redshirting his true freshman season. Zylstra finished his collegiate career with as Minnesota State school records of 227 catches, 4,297 receiving yards, and 54 touchdown receptions.

== Professional career ==
Pre-draft measurables
Height	Weight	Arm length	Hand span	Wingspan
6 ft 3 1/8 in (1.91 m)	213 lb (97 kg)	33 1/8 in (0.84 m)	10 in (0.25 m)	6 ft 7 3/4 in (2.03 m)
All values from Pro Day

=== Minnesota Vikings ===
Zylstra signed with the Minnesota Vikings as an undrafted free agent on May 7, 2021. After signing with the team he was moved from wide receiver to tight end. Zylstra was waived by the Vikings on August 31, during final roster cuts.

=== Detroit Lions ===
Zylstra was signed to the practice squad of the Detroit Lions on September 1, 2021. He was elevated to the active roster on October 10, for the team's week 5 game against the Minnesota Vikings. He signed a reserve/future contract with the Lions on January 10, 2022.

On October 1, 2022, Zylstra was waived by the Lions and re-signed to the practice squad. Zylstra was activated along with his brother Brandon Zylstra for Week 9 against the Green Bay Packers, Shane finished with his first professional touchdown, a one-yard touchdown reception from quarterback Jared Goff. He was signed to the active roster on November 13. On December 24, Zylstra caught three touchdown passes during a game against the Carolina Panthers.

On August 1, 2023, Zylstra was waived/injured by the Lions after suffering a knee injury in training camp, and placed on injured reserve.

Zylstra was waived by the Lions on August 27, 2024, and re-signed to the practice squad. He was promoted to the active roster on November 9.

In Week 2 of the 2025 season against the Chicago Bears, Zylstra suffered an ankle injury while blocking on a punt return; he was placed on injured reserve on September 16, 2025. He was activated on December 13, ahead of the team's Week 15 matchup against the Los Angeles Rams.

=== Buffalo Bills ===
On May 12, 2026, Zylstra signed with the Buffalo Bills on a one-year contract. He was released by the Bills on August 29.

=== New England Patriots ===
On September 2, 2026, Zylstra was signed to the New England Patriots' practice squad. He was released by the Patriots on September 15.

== Personal life ==
Zylstra is the younger brother of wide receiver Brandon Zylstra.
