= Operation Trinity =

Operation Trinity may refer to:

- Trinity (nuclear test)
- Operation Trinity Clerkenwell crime syndicate, first post-Cold War collaboration of Mi5 to investigate organised crime
- Operation Trinity, a supplementary work in the 39 Clues series
