= Brandon Zylstra =

American gridiron football player (born 1993)

No. 83, 15, 11, 16, 13
- Positions: Wide receiver, return specialist

Personal information
- Born: March 25, 1993 (age 33); Spicer, Minnesota, U.S.
- Listed height: 6 ft 2 in (1.88 m)
- Listed weight: 215 lb (98 kg)

Career information
- High school: New London-Spicer (New London, Minnesota)
- College: Concordia–Moorhead
- NFL draft: 2016: undrafted

Career history
- Edmonton Eskimos (2016–2017); Minnesota Vikings (2018); Carolina Panthers (2019–2021); Detroit Lions (2022)

Awards and highlights
- CFL All-Star (2017); CFL West All-Star (2017)

Career NFL statistics
- Receptions: 30
- Receiving yards: 414
- Receiving touchdowns: 1
- Stats at Pro Football Reference

Career CFL statistics
- Receptions: 134
- Receiving yards: 2,195
- Receiving touchdowns: 8
- Stats at CFL.ca

Brandon Zylstra (born March 25, 1993) is an American former professional football player who was a wide receiver and return specialist in the National Football League (NFL) and Canadian Football League (CFL). He played college football for the Concordia Cobbers. After going undrafted in 2016, Zylstra signed with the Edmonton Eskimos of the CFL. He has also played in the NFL for the Minnesota Vikings, Carolina Panthers, and Detroit Lions.

== Early life ==
After playing football and basketball at New London-Spicer High School in New London, Minnesota, Zylstra did not receive any Division I scholarship offers.

== College career ==
Zylstra played college football at Augustana University for a year and then Concordia College in Moorhead, Minnesota. In 2013, during his first year at Concordia, he caught 41 passes for 774 yards with seven touchdowns. In 2014, while working a summer job on the grounds crew at Moorhead Country Club, he suffered a foot injury which required surgery which caused him to miss 1 game. He finished his college career with 1,932 receiving yards and 18 touchdowns in 29 games with the Cobbers.

Zylstra was also an outstanding track and field athlete at Concordia. In 2015, Zylstra helped lead his team to a first-place finish at the Cobber Duals, clearing the bar at 6 ft 8 in (2.03 m) to win the high jump, and traveling a distance of 21 ft 6.75 in (6.5723 m) to win the long jump. He posted a personal-best leap of 22 ft 5.75 in (6.8517 m) in the long jump at the Thundering Herd Classic on February 7. Later in the season, Zylstra came away with the only event win for Concordia at the Cobber Twilight Meet. His 6'9" high jump tied the indoor school-record mark set by Joe Schmidgall back in 2000. He also won the long jump competition with a mark of 21 ft 10 in (6.65 m). Zylstra ultimately broke the outdoor record at the MIAC meet, clearing 6'10.75" Zylstra went on to compete for the Division 3 track nationals where he came in with the third best height in 2015. (2.10m).

== Professional career ==
Before the 2016 NFL draft, Zylstra participated in North Dakota State's pro day and at an NFL regional combine in Arizona, posting a 34-inch vertical jump, a 4.64-second 40-yard dash and 16 reps on the 225 lbs bench press. While he went undrafted, he impressed scouts with his athleticism and catching ability.

Pre-draft measurables
Height	Weight	Arm length	Hand span	40-yard dash	10-yard split	20-yard split	20-yard shuttle	Three-cone drill	Vertical jump	Broad jump	Bench press
6 ft 2 1/2 in (1.89 m)	219 lb (99 kg)	32 1/4 in (0.82 m)	9 in (0.23 m)	4.64 s	1.64 s	2.75 s	4.54 s	7.19 s	34 in (0.86 m)	10 ft 8 in (3.25 m)	16 reps
All values from North Dakota State Pro Day

=== Edmonton Eskimos ===
Following college, Zylstra moved to Arizona to train with former teammate Griffin Neal. While in Arizona, he attracted the interest of CFL teams during tryouts and was signed by the Edmonton Eskimos to a two-year contract. In his first season in the league Zylstra made a quick impact, catching 34 passes for 508 yards with 3 touchdowns in only six regular season games. In two playoff games he caught six passes for 108 yards. He was named the Eskimos rookie of the year for the 2016 season. Zylstra had an outstanding 2017 campaign, leading the CFL in receiving yards with 1,687 (225 ahead of second place S. J. Green). He played a big role in both of the Eskimos playoff games as well, catching 12 passes for 221 yards with one touchdown. He was named a CFL All-Star after the conclusion of the season.

=== Minnesota Vikings ===
On January 3, 2018, Zylstra signed a standard rookie, non-guaranteed three-year deal starting at a $480,000 salary for 2018 with the Minnesota Vikings. He made the Vikings roster, playing in all 16 games primarily on special teams, and had one catch for 23 yards against the New York Jets in Week 7.

On August 31, 2019, Zylstra was waived by the Vikings.

=== Carolina Panthers ===
On September 1, 2019, Zylstra was claimed off waivers by the Carolina Panthers. Zylstra caught one of two targets for seven yards in a Week 14 40–20 loss to the Atlanta Falcons. In Week 17, against the New Orleans Saints, Zylstra posted a career-high six catches on eight targets for 96 yards. On December 27, 2020, Zylstra scored his first career NFL touchdown after recovering a muffed punt return in the endzone that was mishandled by Washington Football Team returner Steve Sims Jr. during the first quarter of a 20–13 victory for the Panthers. After the game, Zylstra was congratulated by Washington head coach Ron Rivera, who was his coach the previous season.

On February 22, 2021, Zylstra signed a one-year contract extension with the Panthers. He was placed on injured reserve on October 19, 2021. He was activated on November 13.

On December 18, 2021, Zylstra kicked off three times in place of Zane Gonzalez after he got injured in warmups against the Buffalo Bills, averaging 48.7 yards per kick.

On March 16, 2022, Zylstra re-signed with the Panthers. He was released on August 30, 2022.

=== Detroit Lions ===
On October 4, 2022, Zylstra signed with the Detroit Lions, joining his brother Shane on the practice squad. Zylstra was activated along with Shane for Week 9 against the Green Bay Packers.
