= Trindade (brand) =

Brand of still bottled water in Cape Verde

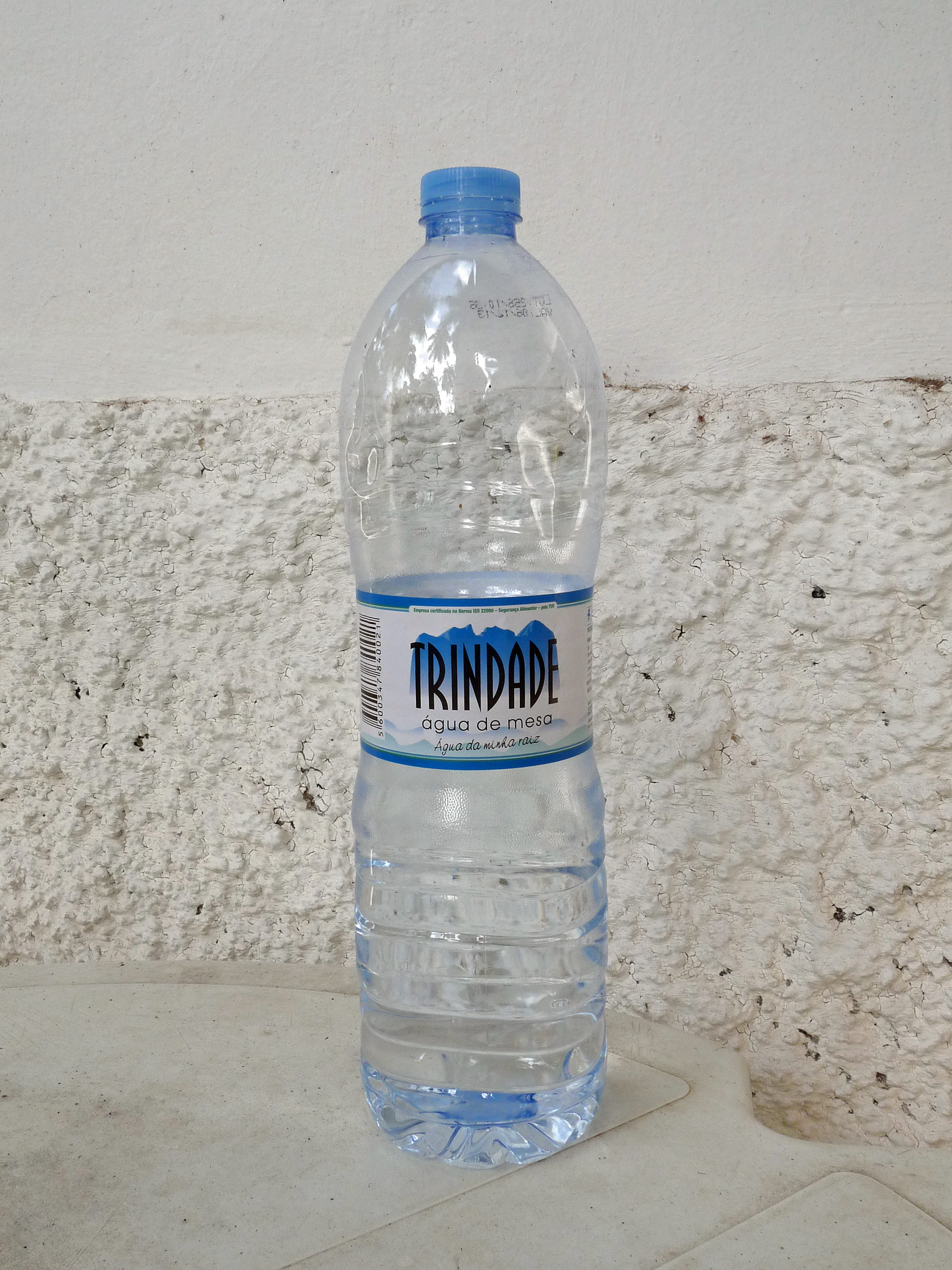
Bottle of Trindade water

Trindade (Portuguese meaning Trinity) is a brand of still bottled water in Cape Verde. It is produced by the company Tecnicil Indústria ("Águas de Cabo Verde" before 2008).
