= Trinity Bridge =

Trinity Bridge may refer to:

- Trinity Bridge, Greater Manchester
- Trinity Bridge, Crowland
- Trinity Bridge, Saint Petersburg
- Trinity College Bridge, Cambridge
