= Trilogy (disambiguation) =

A trilogy is a set of three dramatic or literary works.

Trilogy may also refer to:

== Business ==
- Trilogy (company), a technology consulting company based in Austin, Texas
- Trilogy Education Services, an education technology company
- Trilogy International Partners, an American wireless telecommunications company
- Trilogy Systems, a failed startup company founded by Gene Amdahl
- Viva (network operator), a Dominican mobile network operator formerly known as Trilogy Dominicana

== Music ==
=== Albums ===
- The Cure: Trilogy, a live performance DVD by The Cure
- III – Tri-Logy, an album by the Finnish group Kingston Wall
- Trill OG, an album by Bun B
- Trilogy: Past Present Future, a 1980 triple album by Frank Sinatra
- Trilogy (ATB album), 2007
- Trilogy (Emerson, Lake & Palmer album)
- Trilogy (Enigma album), a compilation album by Enigma
- Trilogy (Faderhead album), a compilation album by Faderhead
- Trilogy (The Weeknd album), a compilation album by The Weeknd
- Trilogy (Yngwie Malmsteen album)
- Trilogy (Sam Rivers album), 2011
- Trilogy (Chick Corea album), 2013
- Trilogy (Ana Popović album), 2016
- Trilogy 2, album by Chick Corea with Christian McBride and Brian Blade, released 2018
- The Trilogy (album), a 2004 box set by Green Carnation
- "Trilogy," a compilation of the three Carpenter Brut EPs

=== Other music ===
- Trilogy (group), a freestyle music group from New York City, US
- "Trilogy," a three-song suite by Sonic Youth from the album Daydream Nation
- Trilogy polyphonic synthesizer, manufactured by Crumar in the 1980s
- The Trilogy Tour (Melanie Martinez), a concert tour by American artist Melanie Martinez
- The Trilogy Tour (Nine Inch Nails)

== Other titles ==
- The Trilogy of Sienkiewicz, the series of three novels written by the Polish author Henryk Sienkiewicz
- German trilogy, also known as the trilogy, three novels by Louis-Ferdinand Céline
- Trilogy (film), a 1969 film
- "Trilogy" (Quantum Leap), a 1992 television episode in three parts
- Trilogy (sculpture), a bronze sculpture by Larry Anderson

== Other ==
- Trilogy (basketball), the 3-on-3 basketball team that plays in the BIG3
