= Trinidad (given name) =

Origin
- Origin: Spanish
- Meaning: “Trinity”

Other names
- See also: Trini, Trinity

Trinidad is a given name of Spanish origin that is often given in reference to the Christian doctrine of the Trinity, or one God in three persons. It is currently among the most popular names for girls in Chile.

- Trinidad Cardona (born 1999), American singer and songwriter
- Trinidad Chambliss (born 2002), American college football quarterback
- Trinidad de Leon-Roxas (1899–1995), 5th First Lady of the Philippines
- Trinidad James (born 1987), Trinidad-born American rapper
- Trinidad Legarda (1899–1998), Filipina suffragist, clubwoman, philanthropist, and editor
- Trinidad López III (1937–2020), American singer and guitarist
- Trinidad María Enríquez (1846–1891), Peruvian teacher and student
- Trinidad Morales Vargas (born 1957), Mexican politician
- Trinidad Núñez Quiñones (born 1948), artisan, artist, researcher and teacher
- Trinidad Olga Ramos Sanguino (1918–2005), Spanish cupletista, violinist, and actress
- Trinidad "Trina" Padilla de Sanz (1894–1957), Puerto Rican, writer, poet, storyteller
