= Trinity Islands (Nunavut) =

Island group in Nunavut, Canada

- Location within Nunavut Location within Canada

Geography
- Location: Northern Canada
- Coordinates: 64°27′20″N 078°07′00″W

Administration
- Canada
- Territory: Nunavut
- Region: Qikiqtaaluk

Demographics
- Population: Uninhabited

One of the Baffin Island offshore island groups, the uninhabited Trinity Islands are located in Foxe Basin, west of Lonebutte Bay. They are part of the Qikiqtaaluk Region, in the Canadian territory of Nunavut.
