= Blue Trinity =

Series of Soviet supervillains by DC Comics

Publication information
- Publisher: DC Comics
- First appearance: The Flash (vol. 2) #7 (December 1987)
- Created by: Mike Baron (writer); Jackson Guice (artist)

In-story information
- Base(s): Kiev, Soviet Union
- Member(s): Gregor Gregorovich; Boleslaw Uminski; Christina Alexandrova Molotova

The Blue Trinity (Russian: Голубая Троица, romanized: Golubaya Troitsa) are a series of Soviet supervillains, created by DC Comics, that debuted in The Flash vol. 2 #7 (December 1987). Unlike their successors, the Red Trinity, the members of this team were emotionally unstable and abnormally strong and antagonists in the stories of the Flash.

== Fictional story ==
Two Soviet scientists, Dr. Pytor Orloff and Dr. Krulik, were amazed at reports of Barry Allen. Orloff was interested with the benefits such powers would bring to society, whereas Krulik was only interested in the military applications.

They began working on a serum, which Orloff invented first. However, Krulik was fed up because he consistently used only animal subjects. Krulik wanted to test with human subjects. The Kremlin provided three children, but not before Krulik had tested the serum on himself. When he first used his speed, the friction from the air burned him alive.

The three children were Gregor Gregorovich, Boleslaw Uminski, and Christina. Orloff was left to oversee their upbringing. They became Blue Trinity. They were controlled by the army and stationed near Kiev. They were stronger and more loyal to the Soviet Union than their counterparts Red Trinity. Blue Trinity was sent to chase the Flash and Red Trinity who were fleeing the Soviet Union with Dr. Orloff who was being brought to the United States to help Jerry McGee, but they were defeated. After Orloff had arrived in America, Blue Trinity again was sent by the Soviet government to kill him. After a short battle with Red Trinity, Orloff convinced them to leave in peace. Blue Trinity had been hired by Rudy West to capture the Flash and take back to the Manhunter's base in Siberia. However, their attempt was foiled by Red Trinity who appeared at just the right moment.

Blue Trinity was betrayed by the Manhunters and imprisoned, then sold to Vandal Savage who experimented on them with Velocity.

== Members ==
- Gregor Gregorovich
- Boleslaw Uminski
- Christina Alexandrova Molotova / Lady Flash
