= Trinity Benson =

American football player (born 1997)

No. 17, 19
- Position: Wide receiver

Personal information
- Born: January 16, 1997 (age 29); Lewisville, Texas, U.S.
- Listed height: 5 ft 11 in (1.80 m)
- Listed weight: 180 lb (82 kg)

Career information
- High school: Lewisville
- College: East Central
- NFL draft: 2019: undrafted

Career history
- Denver Broncos (2019–2021)*; Detroit Lions (2021); Denver Broncos (2022)*; Detroit Lions (2022); Cleveland Browns (2023)*
- * Offseason or practice squad member only

Career NFL statistics
- Receptions: 10
- Receiving yards: 103
- Stats at Pro Football Reference

Trinity Benson (born January 16, 1997) is an American former professional football player who was a wide receiver in the National Football League (NFL). He played college football for the East Central Tigers.

== College career ==
Benson played college football for the East Central Tigers. He rushed for 324 yards and five touchdowns with 507 yards and four touchdowns on 45 receptions as a senior and was named first-team All-Great American Conference.

== Professional career ==
Pre-draft measurables
| Height | Weight | Arm length | Hand span | 40-yard dash | 10-yard split | 20-yard split | 20-yard shuttle | Three-cone drill | Vertical jump | Broad jump | Bench press |
|---|---|---|---|---|---|---|---|---|---|---|---|
| 5 ft 11 1/4 in (1.81 m) | 182 lb (83 kg) | 32 1/8 in (0.82 m) | 9 3/8 in (0.24 m) | 4.44 s | 1.60 s | 2.54 s | 4.25 s | 6.87 s | 40.5 in (1.03 m) | 10 ft 4 in (3.15 m) | 15 reps |
All values from Pro Day

=== Denver Broncos (first stint) ===
Benson signed with the Denver Broncos as an undrafted free agent on April 29, 2019. He was cut by the team at the end of training camp on August 31. The Broncos re-signed Benson to their practice squad on September 24.

=== Detroit Lions (first stint) ===
On August 31, 2021, the Broncos traded Benson and a sixth-round selection in the 2023 NFL draft to the Detroit Lions in exchange for fifth- and seventh-round selections in the 2022 NFL draft.

On August 30, 2022, Benson was waived by the Lions.

=== Denver Broncos (second stint) ===
On October 11, 2022, Benson was signed to the Broncos practice squad.

=== Detroit Lions (second stint) ===
On November 9, 2022, Benson was signed by the Lions off the Broncos practice squad. He was placed on injured reserve on November 18. Benson was waived on August 27, 2023.

=== Cleveland Browns ===
On November 7, 2023, Benson was signed to the Cleveland Browns practice squad. He was released on November 20.

== NFL career statistics ==
=== Regular season ===
| Year | Team | GP | GS | Receiving | | | | | | | Fumbles | |
| Year | Team | GP | GS | Rec | Tgt | Yds | Avg | Lng | TD | FD | Fum | Lost |
|---|---|---|---|---|---|---|---|---|---|---|---|---|
| 2021 | DET | 8 | 3 | 10 | 22 | 103 | 10.3 | 24 | 0 | 4 | 0 | 0 |
| 2022 | DET | 1 | 0 | 0 | 0 | 0 | 0.0 | 0 | 0 | 0 | 0 | 0 |
| Total | | 9 | 3 | 10 | 22 | 103 | 10.3 | 24 | 0 | 4 | 0 | 0 |

== Personal life ==
In May 2024, Benson began dating professional soccer player Trinity Rodman, the daughter of former NBA player Dennis Rodman.
