= Holy Trinity Church =

Holy Trinity Church may refer to:

== Albania ==
- Holy Trinity Church (Berat), Berat County
- Holy Trinity Church, Lavdar, Opar, Korçë County

== Antarctica ==
- Trinity Church (Antarctica)

== Armenia ==
- Holy Trinity Church, Yerevan

== Australia ==
- Garrison Church, Sydney, South Wales, also known as Holy Trinity Garrison Church
- Holy Trinity Anglican Church, Berrima, New South Wales
- Holy Trinity Anglican Church, Coburg, Victoria
- Holy Trinity Anglican Church, Herberton, Queensland
- Holy Trinity Anglican Church, Northampton, Western Australia
- Holy Trinity Anglican Church, Roebourne, Western Australia
- Holy Trinity Anglican Church, Woolloongabba, Brisbane, Queensland
- Holy Trinity Church, Adelaide, South Australia
- Holy Trinity Church, Bacchus Marsh, Victoria
- Holy Trinity Church, Fortitude Valley, Brisbane, Queensland
  - Holy Trinity Parish Hall, Fortitude Valley
  - Holy Trinity Rectory, Fortitude Valley
- Holy Trinity Church, Mackay, Queensland
- Holy Trinity Church, Saibai Island, Queensland
- Holy Trinity Church, North Hobart, Tasmania
- Holy Trinity Church, York, Western Australia
- Lutheran Trinity Church, East Melbourne, Victoria

== Austria ==
- Holy Trinity Church, Salzburg
- Wotruba Church, Vienna

== Belarus ==
- Church of the Holy Trinity, Minsk

== Bulgaria ==
- Church of the Holy Trinity, Svishtov

== Canada ==
- Cathedral of the Holy Trinity (Quebec)
- Church of the Holy Trinity (Toronto)
- Holy Trinity Anglican Church (Winnipeg)
- Holy Trinity Anglican Church (Alma, Prince Edward Island)
- Holy Trinity Anglican Church (Maple Grove, Quebec)
- Holy Trinity Anglican Church (Stanley Mission, Saskatchewan)

== China ==
- Holy Trinity Church, Shanghai

== Croatia ==
- Church of the Holy Trinity, Split

== Czech Republic ==
- Holy Trinity Church, Fulnek
- Holy Trinity Church, Opočno

== Finland ==
- Holy Trinity Church, Helsinki

== France ==
- Abbey of Sainte-Trinité, Caen, in the Abbaye aux Dames
- Holy Trinity Church, Ajaccio, Corsica
- Sainte-Trinité, Paris

== Georgia ==
- Gergeti Trinity Church

== Germany ==
- Holy Trinity Church, Bad Berneck
- Holy Trinity Church, Berlin
- Trinitatiskirche, Dresden
- Trinity Church, Munich
- Dreifaltigkeitskirche, Speyer
- St. Trinitatis, Wolfenbüttel

== Hong Kong ==
- Holy Trinity Church, Kowloon, consecrated a cathedral in 2010

== India ==
- Holy Trinity Church, Bangalore, Karnataka
- The Holy Trinity Church, Changanacherry, Kerala
- Holy Trinity Church, Powai, Mumbai, Maharashtra
- Holy Trinity Church, Ooty, Tamil Nadu
- Holy Trinity Church, Yercaud, Tamil Nadu
- Holy Trinity Church, Bolarum, Secunderabad, Telangana

== Ireland ==
- Holy Trinity Church, Cork, County Cork
- Holy Trinity Church, Templebreedy, County Cork

== Italy ==
- See Santissima Trinità (disambiguation)

== Kosovo ==
- Church of the Holy Trinity, Velika Reka

== Latvia ==
- Holy Trinity Orthodox Church, Riga

== Lithuania ==
- Church of the Holy Trinity, Panevėžys
- Church of the Holy Trinity, Pikeliai
- Church of the Holy Trinity in Trinapolis, Vilnius
- Monastery of the Holy Trinity, Vilnius
- Sanctuary of the Divine Mercy, Vilnius

== Luxembourg ==
- Trinity Church, Luxembourg

== Malta ==
- Church of the Holy Trinity, Sliema
- Trinity Church, Marsa

== Mongolia ==
- Holy Trinity Church, Ulaanbaatar

== New Zealand ==
- Holy Trinity Avonside, Christchurch
- Holy Trinity Church, New Plymouth
- Holy Trinity Church, Pakaraka
- Holy Trinity Church, Port Chalmers

== Poland ==
- Holy Trinity Church, Baldwinowice
- Church of the Holy Trinity, Bydgoszcz
- Church of the Holy Trinity, Dubienka
- Church of the Holy Trinity, Hajnówka
- Church of the Holy Trinity, Kraków (Kazimierz)
- Church of the Holy Trinity, Kraków (Old Town)
- Chapel of the Holy Trinity, Lublin Castle
- Holy Trinity Church, Miejsce Odrzańskie
- Holy Trinity Church, Strzelno
- Church of the Holy Trinity, Tarnogród
- Church of the Holy Trinity, Podwale, Warsaw (Orthodox)
- Holy Trinity Church, Warsaw (Lutheran)

== Puerto Rico ==
- Iglesia de la Santísima Trinidad, Ponce

== Romania ==
- Holy Trinity Church, Alba Iulia
- Dârste Church, or Holy Trinity Church, Dârste, Brașov
- Greek Church (Brașov), or Holy Trinity Greek Church, Brașov
- Holy Trinity Church, Oradea
- Holy Trinity Church, Sighișoara

== Russia ==
- Church of the Holy Trinity at the Borisovo Ponds, Moscow
- Holy Trinity Church, Tobolsk

== Serbia ==
- Cathedral of the Holy Trinity, Leskovac

== Sierra Leone ==
- Holy Trinity Church, Freetown

== Singapore ==
- Church of the Holy Trinity, Singapore

== Slovakia ==
- Articular church, Kežmarok
- Church of Holy Trinity, Mošovce
- Most Holy Trinity Church, Tvrdošín
- Holy Trinity Church (Žilina)

== Slovenia ==
- Holy Trinity Church (Hrastovlje)
- Ursuline Church of the Holy Trinity, Ljubljana

== South Africa ==
- Holy Trinity Catholic Church, Braamfontein

== Sri Lanka ==
- Holy Trinity Church, Nuwara Eliya

== Sweden ==
- Holy Trinity Parish, Arboga
- Holy Trinity Church, Gävle
- Holy Trinity Church, Kristianstad
- Holy Trinity Church, Malmö
- Holy Trinity Church, Uppsala

== Syria ==
- Holy Trinity Church, Aleppo

== Turkey ==
- Holy Trinity Church, Eskişehir
- Holy Trinity Church, Sivrihisar

== Ukraine ==
- Gate Church of the Trinity (Pechersk Lavra), Kyiv
- Holy Trinity Cathedral, Simferopol (Simferopol), Crimea
- Holy Trinity Church, Kamianets-Podilskyi
- Holy Trinity Church, Zarvanytsia
- Holy Trinity Church, Zhovkva

== United Arab Emirates ==
- Holy Trinity Church, Dubai

== United Kingdom ==
=== England ===
==== Berkshire ====
- Holy Trinity Church, Reading
- Holy Trinity Church, Theale

==== Bristol ====
- Church of Holy Trinity, Hotwells
- Holy Trinity Church, Lawrence Hill (now the Trinity Centre)
- Church of Holy Trinity, Stapleton
- Holy Trinity Church, Westbury on Trym

==== Buckinghamshire ====
- Holy Trinity Church, Bledlow

==== Cambridgeshire ====
- Holy Trinity Church, Balsham
- Holy Trinity Church, Cambridge

==== Cheshire ====
- Holy Trinity Church, Bickerton
- Holy Trinity Church, Capenhurst
- Holy Trinity Chapel, Capesthorne
- Holy Trinity Church, Chester (now the Guildhall)
- Holy Trinity Church, Congleton
- Holy Trinity Church, Hurdsfield
- Holy Trinity Church, Northwich
- Holy Trinity Church, Rainow
- Holy Trinity Church, Runcorn
- Holy Trinity Church, Warrington

==== Cornwall ====
- Holy Trinity Church, St Austell

==== Cumbria ====
- Holy Trinity Church, Brathay
- Holy Trinity Church, Casterton
- Holy Trinity Church, Colton
- Holy Trinity Church, Howgill
- Church of Holy Trinity and St George, Kendal (the town's Roman Catholic parish church)
- Kendal Parish Church, also known as Holy Trinity Church (the town's Anglican parish church)
- Holy Trinity Church, Millom
- Holy Trinity Church, Seathwaite
- Holy Trinity Church, Ulverston

==== Derbyshire ====
- Holy Trinity Church, Ashford-in-the-Water
- Holy Trinity Church, Chesterfield
- Holy Trinity Church, Derby
- Holy Trinity Church, Kirk Ireton
- Holy Trinity Church, Stanton-in-Peak

==== Dorset ====
- Holy Trinity Church, Bothenhampton
- Holy Trinity Church, Dorchester

==== Devon ====
- Holy Trinity Church, Exmouth
- Holy Trinity Church, Torbryan

==== Durham ====
- Holy Trinity Church, Sunderland
- Holy Trinity Church, Thorpe Thewles

==== East Riding of Yorkshire ====
- Hull Minster, known as Holy Trinity Church until 2017

==== East Sussex ====
- Holy Trinity Church, Brighton
- Holy Trinity Church, Hastings
- Holy Trinity Church, Hove

==== Essex ====
- Holy Trinity Church, Halstead
- Holy Trinity Church, Southchurch

==== Gloucestershire ====
- Holy Trinity Church, Kingswood

==== Greater Manchester ====
- Holy Trinity Armenian Church, Manchester
- Holy Trinity Church, Bolton
- Holy Trinity Church, Bury
- Holy Trinity Church, Horwich
- Holy Trinity Platt Church, Rusholme, Manchester

==== Hampshire ====
- Holy Trinity Church, Aldershot
- Holy Trinity Church, Millbrook
- Holy Trinity Church, Privett
- Holy Trinity Church, Winchester

==== Hertfordshire ====
- Holy Trinity Church, Weston

==== Isle of Wight ====
- Holy Trinity Church, Bembridge
- Holy Trinity Church, Cowes
- Holy Trinity Church, Ryde
- Holy Trinity Church, Ventnor

==== Kent ====
- Holy Trinity Church, Coxheath
- Holy Trinity Church, East Peckham
- Holy Trinity Church, Tunbridge Wells (now Trinity Theatre)

==== Lancashire ====
- Holy Trinity Church, Blackburn
- Holy Trinity Church, Blackpool
- Holy Trinity Church, Bolton-le-Sands
- Holy Trinity Church, Burnley
- Holy Trinity Church, Hoghton
- Holy Trinity Church, Morecambe
- Holy Trinity Church, Tarleton
- Holy Trinity Church, Wray

==== Leicestershire ====
- Holy Trinity Church, Ashby-de-la-Zouch
- Holy Trinity Church, Leicester
- Holy Trinity Church, Barrow upon Soar

==== Lincolnshire ====
- Church of Holy Trinity, Barrow upon Humber
- Holy Trinity Church, Tattershall
- Holy Trinity in Clasketgate Church, Lincoln

==== London ====
- Holy Trinity Brompton
- Holy Trinity Church, Canning Town
- Holy Trinity Church, Clapham
- Holy Trinity Church, Dalston
- Church of Holy Trinity, Eltham
- Holy Trinity Church, Marylebone
- Church of Holy Trinity, Minories
- Holy Trinity, Sloane Street
- Holy Trinity Church, South Kensington
- Holy Trinity Church, Tulse Hill

==== Merseyside ====
- Holy Trinity Church, Hoylake
- Holy Trinity Church, Southport
- Holy Trinity Church, Wavertree, Liverpool

==== Norfolk ====
- Holy Trinity Church, Rackheath

==== Northamptonshire ====
- Holy Trinity Church, Blatherwycke

==== North Yorkshire ====
- Holy Trinity Church, Coverham
- Holy Trinity Church, Goodramgate, York
- Holy Trinity Church, King's Court, demolished church in York
- Holy Trinity Church, Little Ouseburn
- Holy Trinity Church, Micklegate, York
- St James with Holy Trinity Church, Scarborough
- Holy Trinity Church, Skipton
- Holy Trinity Church, Wensley

==== Nottinghamshire ====
- Holy Trinity Church, Besthorpe
- Holy Trinity Church, Bulcote
- Holy Trinity Church, Everton
- Holy Trinity Church, Kirton
- Holy Trinity Church, Lambley
- Holy Trinity Church, Lenton
- Holy Trinity Church, Ratcliffe-on-Soar
- Holy Trinity Church, Rolleston
- Holy Trinity Church, Southwell
- Holy Trinity Church, Trinity Square, Nottingham (demolished 1958)
- Holy Trinity Church, Tythby
- Holy Trinity Church, Wysall

==== Oxfordshire ====
- Holy Trinity Church, Chipping Norton
- Holy Trinity Church, Headington Quarry

==== Shropshire ====
- Holy Trinity Church, Coalbrookdale
- Holy Trinity Church, Holdgate

==== Somerset ====
- Holy Trinity Church, Abbots Leigh
- Church of Holy Trinity, Burrington
- Church of Holy Trinity, Cleeve
- Church of the Holy Trinity, Long Sutton
- Holy Trinity Church, Norton Malreward
- Church of the Holy Trinity, Paulton

==== South Yorkshire ====
- Holy Trinity Church, Thurgoland, Thurgoland
- Old Holy Trinity Church, Wentworth

==== Staffordshire ====
- Holy Trinity Church, Eccleshall
- Holy Trinity Church, Newcastle-under-Lyme

Stockton-on-Tees

- Holy Trinity Church, Stockton-on-Tees

==== Suffolk ====
- Holy Trinity Church, Blythburgh
- Holy Trinity Church, Long Melford
- Holy Trinity Church, Nailsea

==== Surrey ====
- Holy Trinity Church, Guildford

==== Tyne and Wear ====
- Holy Trinity Church, Sunderland

==== Warwickshire ====
- Holy Trinity Church, Leamington Spa
- Church of the Holy Trinity, Stratford-upon-Avon, William Shakespeare's burial site

==== West Midlands ====
- Holy Trinity Church, Birchfield, Birmingham
- Holy Trinity Church, Bordesley, Birmingham
- Holy Trinity Church, Coventry
- Holy Trinity Church, Heath Town, Wolverhampton
- Holy Trinity Church, Smethwick
- Holy Trinity Church, Sutton Coldfield, Birmingham

==== West Sussex ====
- Holy Trinity Church, Bosham
- Holy Trinity Church, Cuckfield
- Holy Trinity Church, Rudgwick

==== West Yorkshire ====
- Holy Trinity Church, Bingley
- Holy Trinity Church, Bradford
- Holy Trinity Church, Huddersfield
- Holy Trinity Church, Leeds
- Holy Trinity Church, Rothwell

==== Wiltshire ====
- Holy Trinity Church, Trowbridge

==== Worcestershire ====
- Holy Trinity Church, Lickey
- Holy Trinity Church, Malvern Link

==== York ====
- Holy Trinity Church, Goodramgate, York
- Holy Trinity Church, Micklegate, York

=== Scotland ===
- Holy Trinity Church, Spynie, Moray
- Holy Trinity Church, Melrose, Scottish Borders

=== Wales ===
- Holy Trinity Church, Greenfield, Flintshire
- Holy Trinity Church, Sarn, Powys

== United States ==
- Holy Trinity Church (Juneau, Alaska)
- Holy Trinity Church, Fresno, California
- Holy Trinity Church (Trinidad, California)
- Holy Trinity Roman Catholic Church (Hartford, Connecticut)
- Church of the Holy Trinity and Rectory (Middletown, Connecticut)
- Holy Trinity Church (Old Swedes), in New Castle County, Delaware
- Holy Trinity Catholic Church (Washington, D.C.)
- Holy Trinity Episcopal Church (Melbourne, Florida)
  - Holy Trinity Episcopal Church Parish (Melbourne, Florida)
- Holy Trinity Catholic Church (Honolulu), Hawaii
- Holy Trinity Church Rectory and Convent, Bloomington, Illinois
- Holy Trinity Roman Catholic Church (Chicago), Illinois
- Holy Trinity Catholic Church (Shreveport, Louisiana)
- Holy Trinity Episcopal Church (Bowie, Maryland)
- Church of the Holy Trinity (Churchville, Maryland)
- Holy Trinity Episcopal Church (Luverne, Minnesota)
- Church of the Holy Trinity (Rollingstone, Minnesota)
- Church of the Holy Trinity (Vicksburg, Mississippi)
- Most Holy Trinity Church, Mamaroneck, New York
- Holy Trinity Church (Upper West Side), New York City
- Holy Trinity Church, St. Christopher House and Parsonage, Manhattan, New York City
- Holy Trinity Roman Catholic Church Complex (Niagara Falls, New York)
- Church of the Holy Trinity (Hertford, North Carolina)
- Holy Trinity Anglican Church (Raleigh, North Carolina)
- Holy Trinity Ukrainian Greek Orthodox Church, Wilton, North Dakota
- Holy Trinity Church (Cincinnati, Ohio)
- Church of the Holy Trinity, Philadelphia, Pennsylvania
- Holy Trinity Church (Central Falls, Rhode Island)
- Church of the Holy Trinity (Ridgeland, South Carolina)
- Holy Trinity Church (Kimball, South Dakota)
- Holy Trinity Church (Nashville), Tennessee
- Holy Trinity Roman Catholic Church (Milwaukee, Wisconsin)

== Other uses ==
- Church of the Holy Trinity v. United States (1892), U.S. Supreme Court case

== See also ==
- Trinity Church (disambiguation)
- Dreifaltigkeitskirche (disambiguation)
- Holy Trinity Anglican Church (disambiguation)
- Holy Trinity Cathedral (disambiguation)
- Holy Trinity Episcopal Church (disambiguation)
- Holy Trinity Greek Orthodox Church (disambiguation)
- Holy Trinity Lutheran Church (disambiguation)
