= List of churches in the Diocese of Santa Rosa in California =

This is a list of current and former Catholic churches in the Diocese of Santa Rosa in California in Northern California. The diocese is divided geographically into five deaneries as follows: Humboldt/Del Norte (Del Norte and Humboldt Counties); Mendocino/Lake (Lake and Mendocino Counties); Napa (Napa County); Sonoma North (northern Sonoma County); and Sonoma South (southern Sonoma County).

== Humboldt/Del Norte Deanery ==
Name	Image	Location	Established	Sources
Church of the Assumption		546 Berding St, Ferndale	1879	
Christ the King		1951 McKinleyville Ave, McKinleyville	1967	
Holy Trinity Mission		Trinidad	1873	
Humboldt State University Newman Center		700 Union St, Arcata	1958	
Our Lady of the Redwoods		515 Maple St, Garberville	1950	
Sacred Heart		2085 Myrtle Ave, Eureka	1963	
St. Bernard		615 H St, Eureka	1864	
St. Joseph		14th & N Sts, Fortuna	1909	
St. Joseph		319 E St, Crescent City	1869	
St. Joseph Mission		340 Greenwood Ave, Blue Lake		
St. Joseph Mission		Henderson & C Sts, Eureka		
St. Kateri Tekakwitha Mission		Kateri Lane-Pine Creek Rd, Hoopa		
St. Mary		1690 Janes Rd, Arcata	1883	
St. Patrick Mission		Loleta	1925	
St. Patrick Mission		Petrolia	1912	
St. Robert and St. Ann Mission		Klamath		

== Mendocino/Lake Deanery ==
Name	Image	Location	Established	Sources
Blessed Sacrament Mission		Elk	1968	
Mary Star of the Sea Mission		39141 Church St, Gualala		
Our Lady of Good Counsel		255 S. Harold St, Fort Bragg	1909	
Our Lady of the Lakes		Loch Lomond		
Our Lady of the Pines Mission		Cobb		
Our Lady, Queen of Peace		14435 Uhl Ave, Clearlake	1967	
Our Lady Queen of Peace Mission		23300 Foothill Blvd, Covelo		
Queen of the Rosary Mission		3972 Country Club Dr, Lucerne		
St. Aloysius		70 School Street (Hwy 1), Point Arena	1952	
St. Anthony		10700 Lansing St, Mendocino	1968	
St. Anthony of Padua		61 W. San Francisco Ave, Willits	1923	
St. Elizabeth Seton Mission		Philo		
St. Francis Mission		Hopland	1887	
St. Joseph		21396 Hwy. 175, Middletown	1894	
St. Mary of the Angels		900 S Oak St, Ukiah	1887	
St. Mary Immaculate		801 N. Main St, Lakeport	1914	
St. Peter Mission		Kelseyville		

== Napa Deanery ==
Name	Image	Location	Established	Sources
Holy Family		101 Antonina Ave, American Canyon	1994	
Holy Family Mission		1241 Niebaum Lane, Rutherford		
Our Lady of Perpetual Help		901 Washington St, Calistoga	1915	
St. Apollinaris		3700 Lassen St, Napa	1957	
St. Helena		1340 Tainter St, St. Helena	1887	
St. Joan of Arc		6404 Washington St, Yountville	1920	
St. John the Baptist		960 Caymus St, Napa	1858	
St. Thomas Aquinas		2725 Elm St, Napa	1964	

== Sonoma North Deanery ==
Name	Image	Location	Established	Sources
Cathedral of St. Eugene		2323 Montgomery Dr, Santa Rosa	1950	
Holy Spirit		1244 St. Francis Rd, Santa Rosa	1964	
Sonoma State University Newman Center		1798 East Cotati Ave, Penngrove		
Our Lady of Guadalupe		8400 Old Redwood Hwy, Windsor	1969	
Our Lady of Mount Carmel Mission		23600 Old Redwood Hwy, Asti		
Resurrection Church		303 Stony Point Rd, Santa Rosa	1967	
St. Catherine of Siena Mission		Chapel Dr, Monte Rio		
St. Colman Mission		Cazadero Hwy, Cazadero		
St. Elizabeth		14095 Woodland Dr, Guerneville	1916	
St. John the Baptist		208 Matheson St, Healdsburg	1884	
St. Peter		491 S. Franklin St, Cloverdale	1917	
St. Philip the Apostle		3730 Bohemian Hwy, Occidental	1964	
St. Rose of Lima		398 Tenth St, Santa Rosa	1877	
St. Theresa of Avila		Bodega	1860	
Star of the Valley		545 White Oak Dr, Santa Rosa	1981	

== Sonoma South Deanery ==
Name	Image	Location	Established	Sources
St. Elizabeth Seton		4595 Snyder Lane, Rohnert Park	1981	
St. Francis Solano		469 Third St West, Sonoma	1878	
St. James		125 Sonoma Mountain Parkway, Petaluma	1964	
St. Joseph		150 St. Joseph Way, Cotati	1913	
St. Leo the Great		601 West Agua Caliente Rd, Sonoma	1966	
St. Sebastian		7983 Covert Lane, Sebastopol	1878	
St. Vincent de Paul		35 Liberty St, Petaluma	1857	
