= Holy Trinity Church, Tobolsk =

Coordinates: 58.1966°N 68.2533°E

Holy Trinity Church
- Храм Пресвятой Троицы
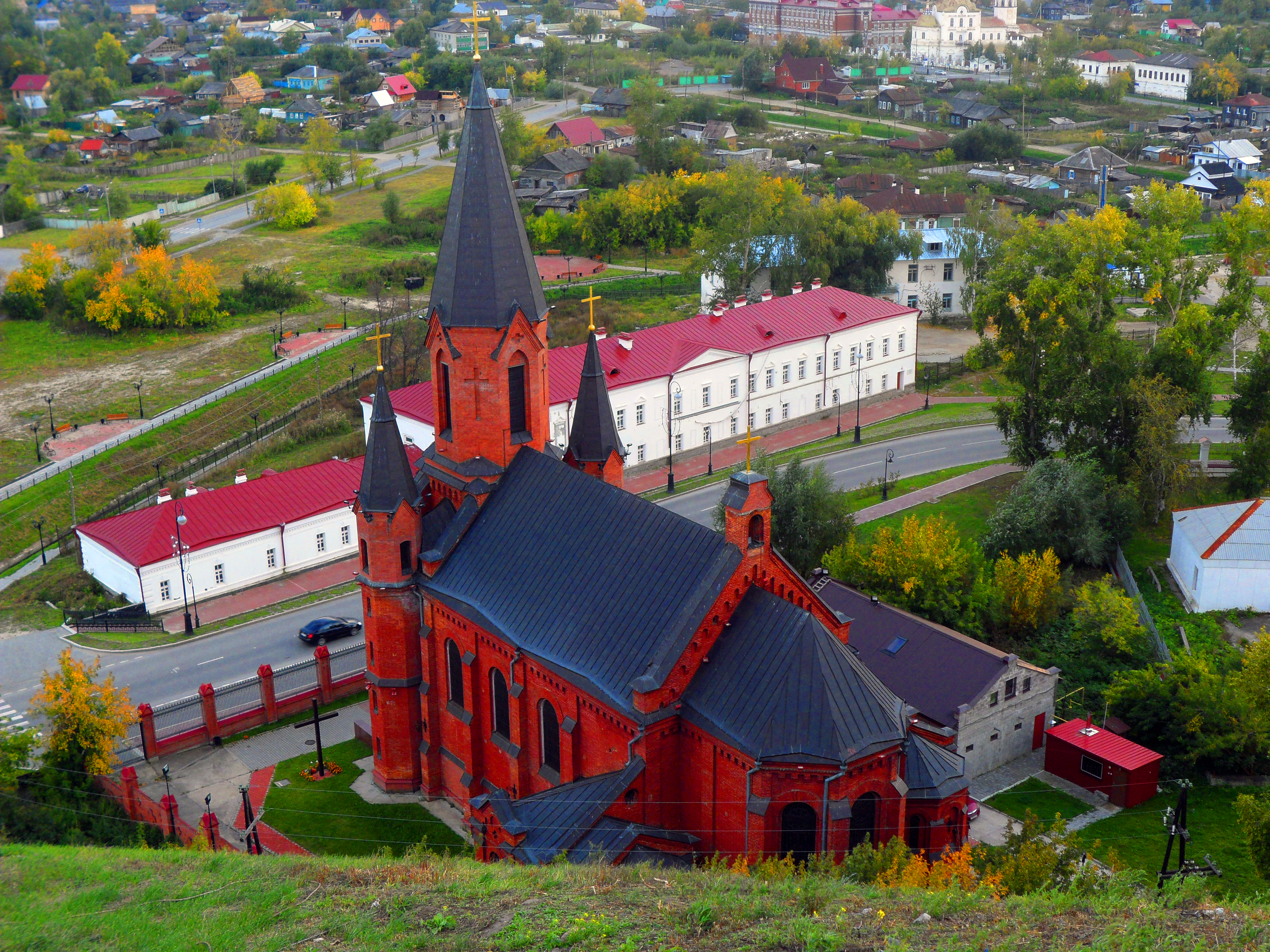
- Holy Trinity Church
- Location: Tobolsk
- Country: Russia
- Denomination: Roman Catholic Church

The Holy Trinity Church (Russian: Храм Пресвятой Троицы) is a Catholic church in the city of Tobolsk, Russia. The church is part of Diocese of Novosibirsk. It is a protected historical monument of Gothic architecture. The church also offers public organ concerts.

== History ==
As with many Catholic communities in Siberia, the original nucleus of the parish consisted of Poles and Lithuanians exiled to Siberia after the insurrectionary events of November 1830 in Poland. The governor gave permission to the community of Catholics to build a church in 1843. The first wooden chapel was built in 1848, and the community was established as a parish in 1868.

In 1891, the church's priest asked permission to build a larger church, and permission was granted six years later. The church was closed for a campaign of atheism during Communism in 1923, and its bell tower was destroyed. During the period of its closure, the church served various other uses. Russia's relationship with religion was normalized after the fall of the communist regime, and the church was returned to the parish in 1993. Restoration of the church lasted until 2000; the church was reconsecrated on August 13, 2000, by Bishop Joseph Werth.

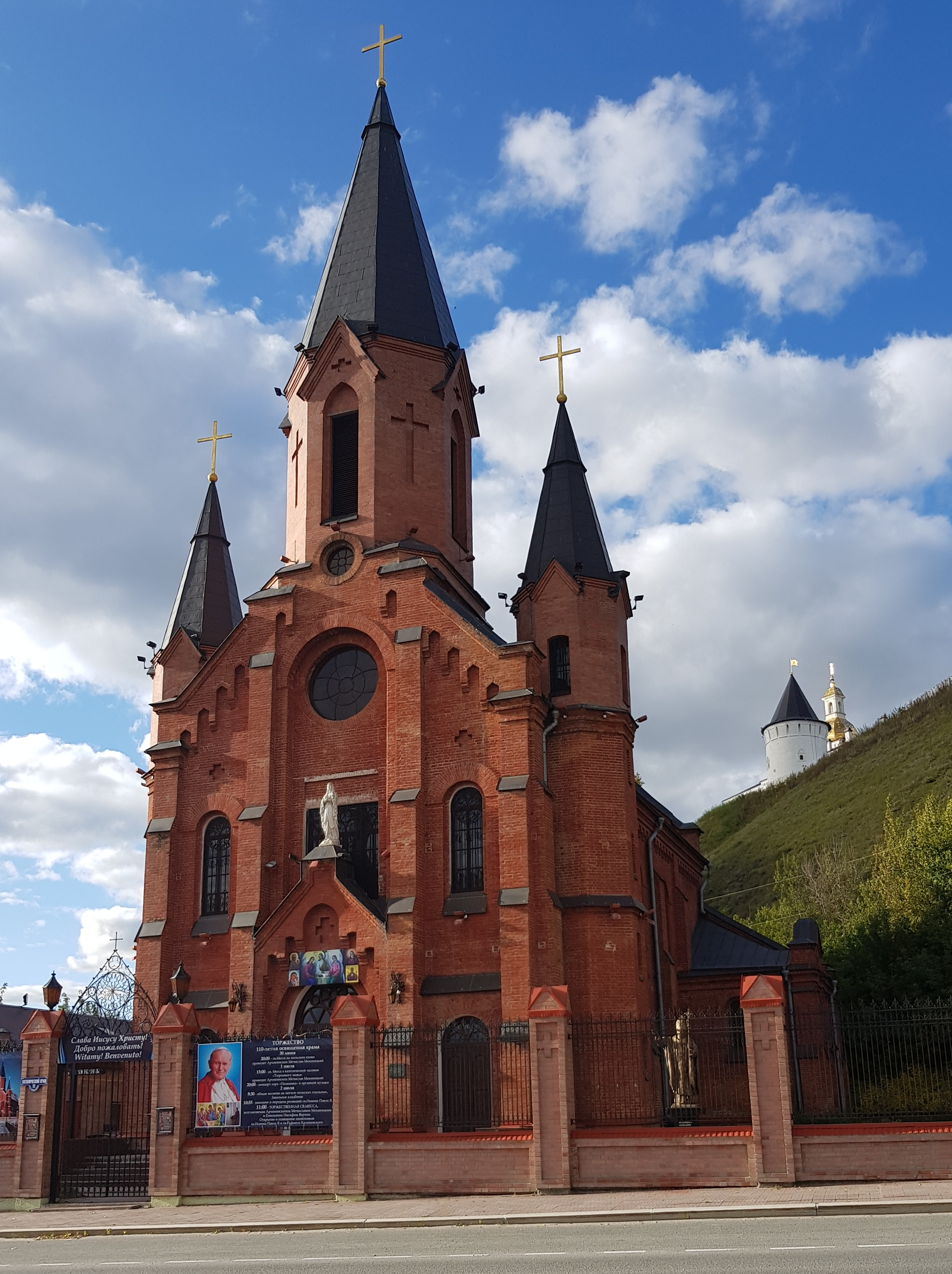
Holy Trinity Church, Tobolsk.

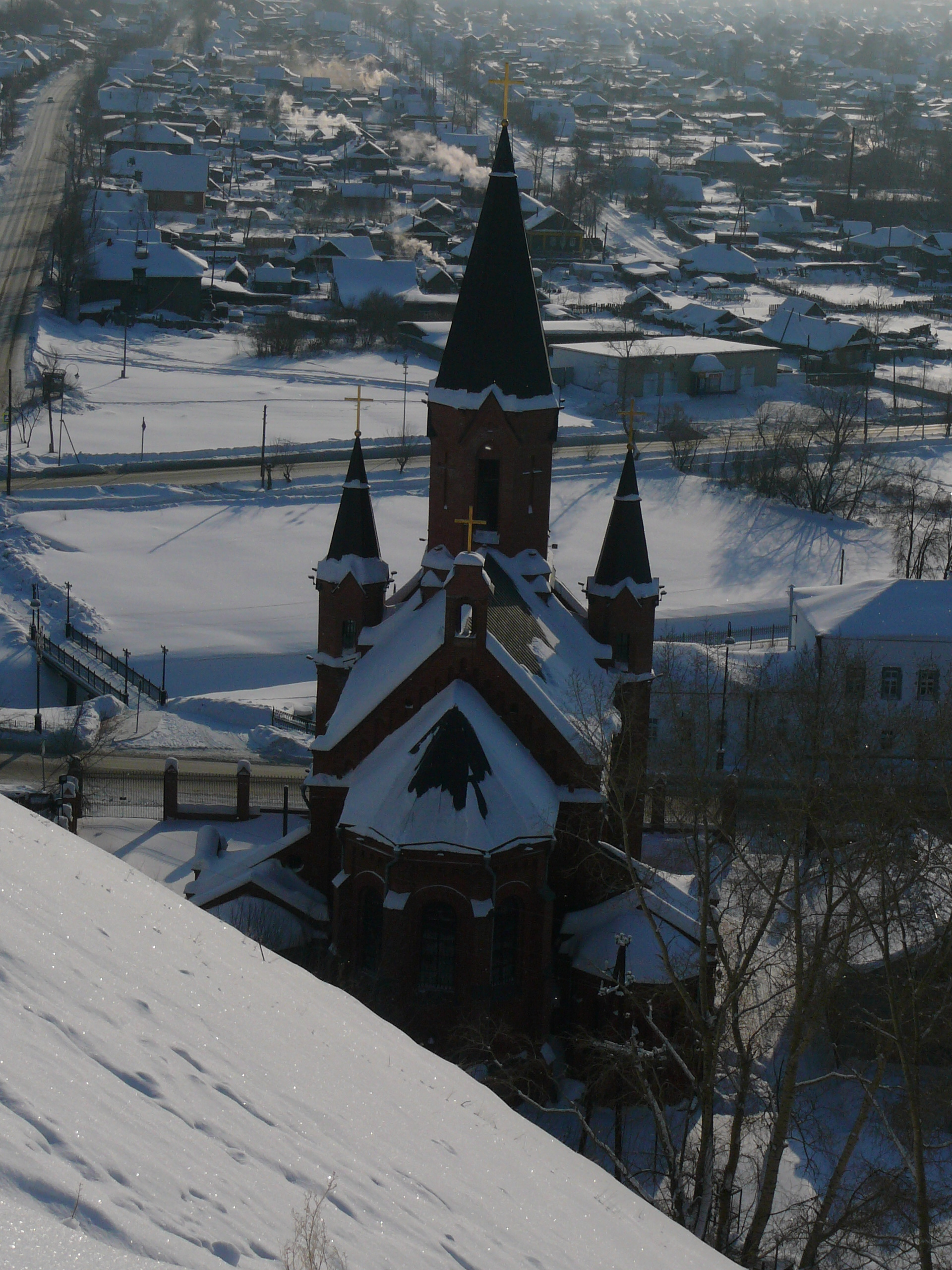
The Catholic Church of the Holy Trinity, view from the Trinity Cape.

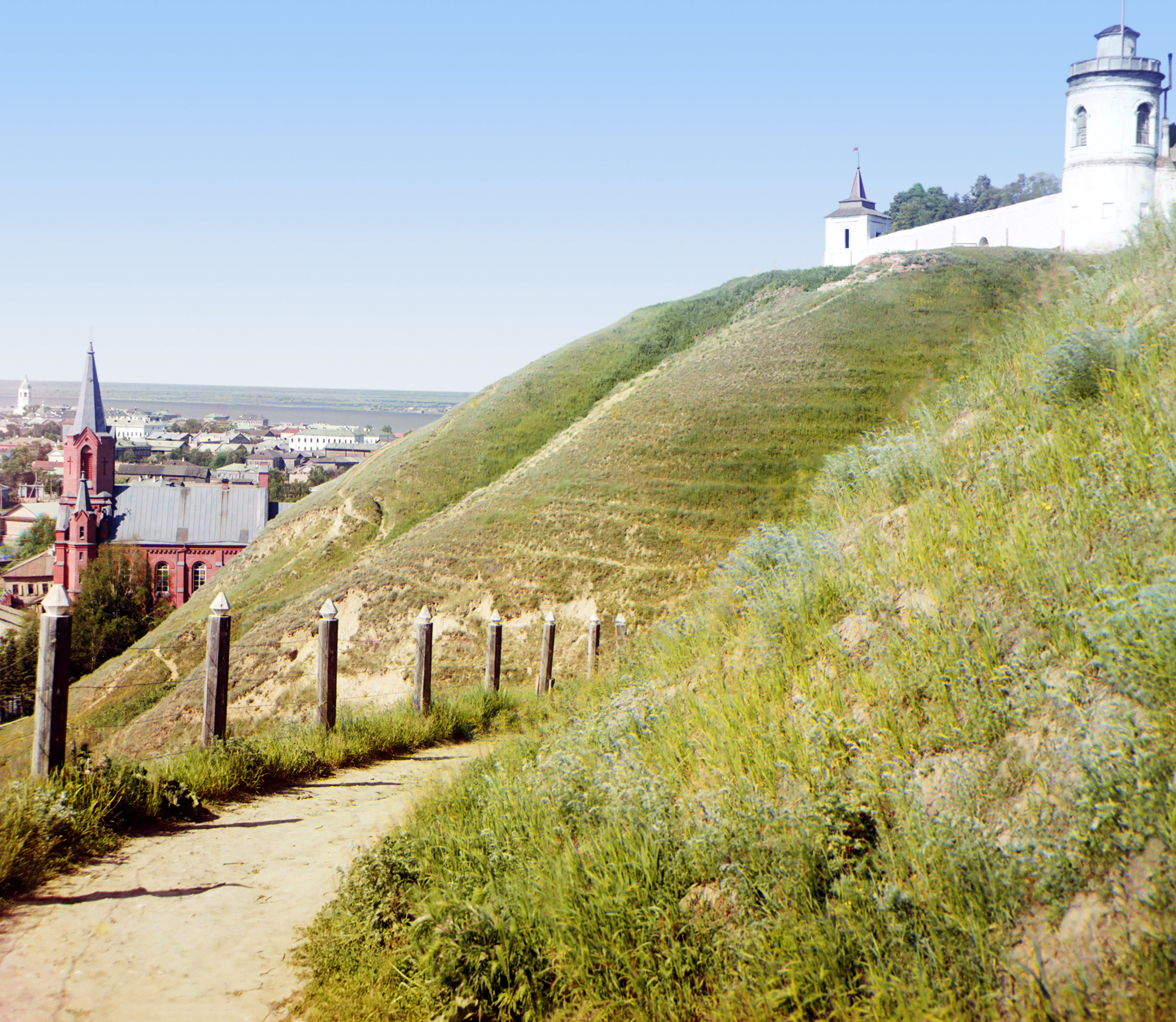
View of the Church, 1912.

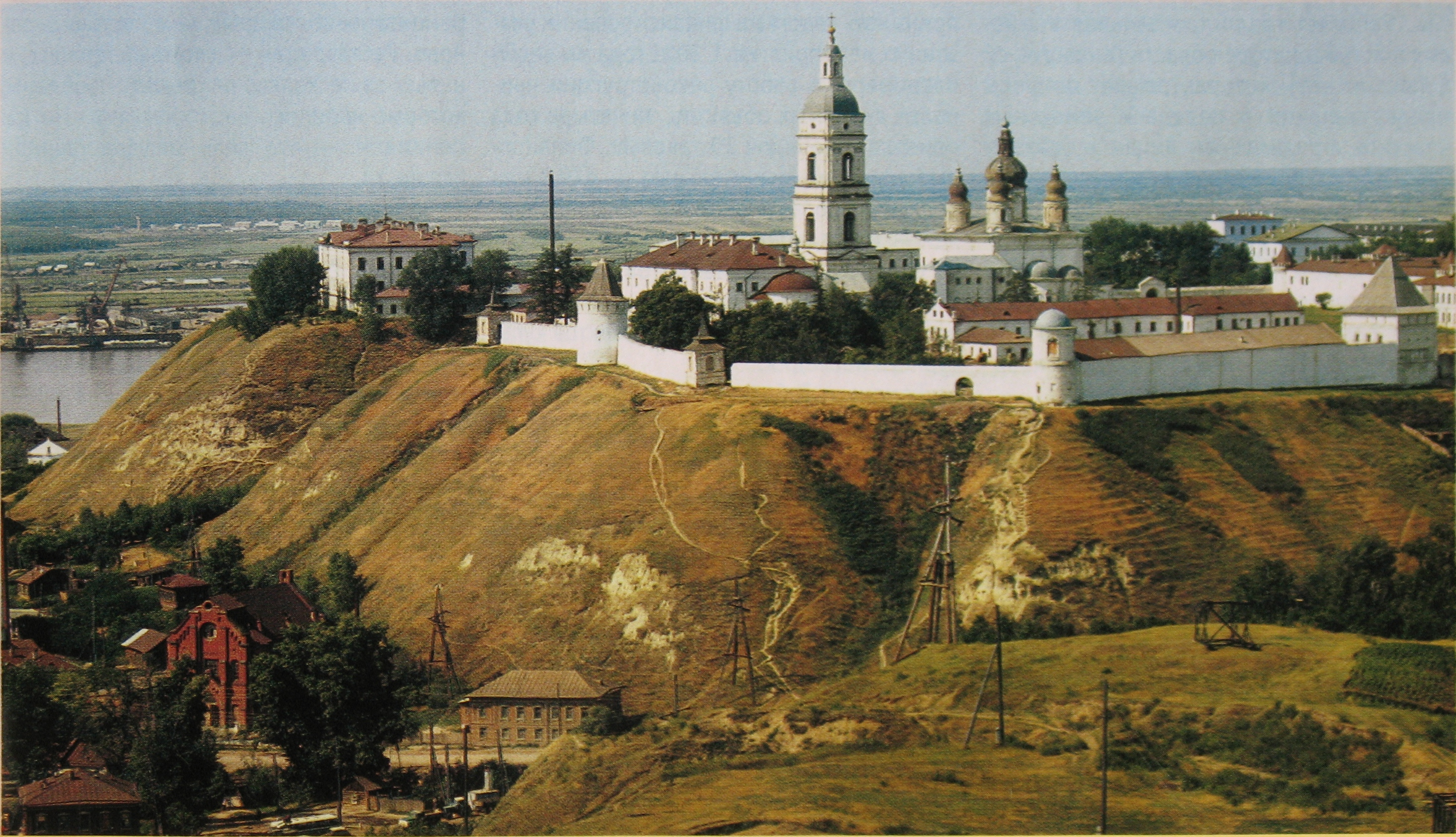
The TChurch (bottom left) without a bell tower, 1990.

== See also ==
- Catholic Church in Russia
- Holy Trinity Church (disambiguation)
