= Holy Trinity Episcopal Church Parish (Melbourne, Florida) =

Holy Trinity Episcopal Church 50 West Strawbridge Avenue Melbourne, Florida
- Holy Trinity Episcopal Church 50 West Strawbridge Avenue Melbourne, Florida
- 28.080206°N 80.623166°W
- Denomination: Episcopal
- Website: Holy Trinity Episcopa Church website

History
- Dedication: Holy Trinity

Administration
- Province: IV
- Diocese: Central Florida
- Parish: Holy Trinity

Clergy
- Rector: The Rev. Tom Phillips

Holy Trinity Episcopal Church, founded in 1884 and now located at 50 West Strawbridge Avenue in Melbourne, Florida, in the United States, is a historic parish in the Episcopal Diocese of Central Florida. Holy Trinity is the oldest church organization in Melbourne. Its original church building, now the chapel, is a historic Carpenter Gothic church built in 1886.

== Carpenter Gothic chapel ==
Holy Trinity's original church building, now the chapel, is a historic Carpenter Gothic church built in 1886. The Rev. Dr. William Porcher DuBose presided over the first service in it on December 27, 1886. The church was originally located on the south bank of Crane Creek, but was moved north of the creek in the 1890s. In the 1950s a new church and other buildings were erected on Strawbridge Avenue and the old church became the chapel. In 1963 the chapel was moved to its present location on the new church grounds on Strawbridge Avenue.

== Gallery ==
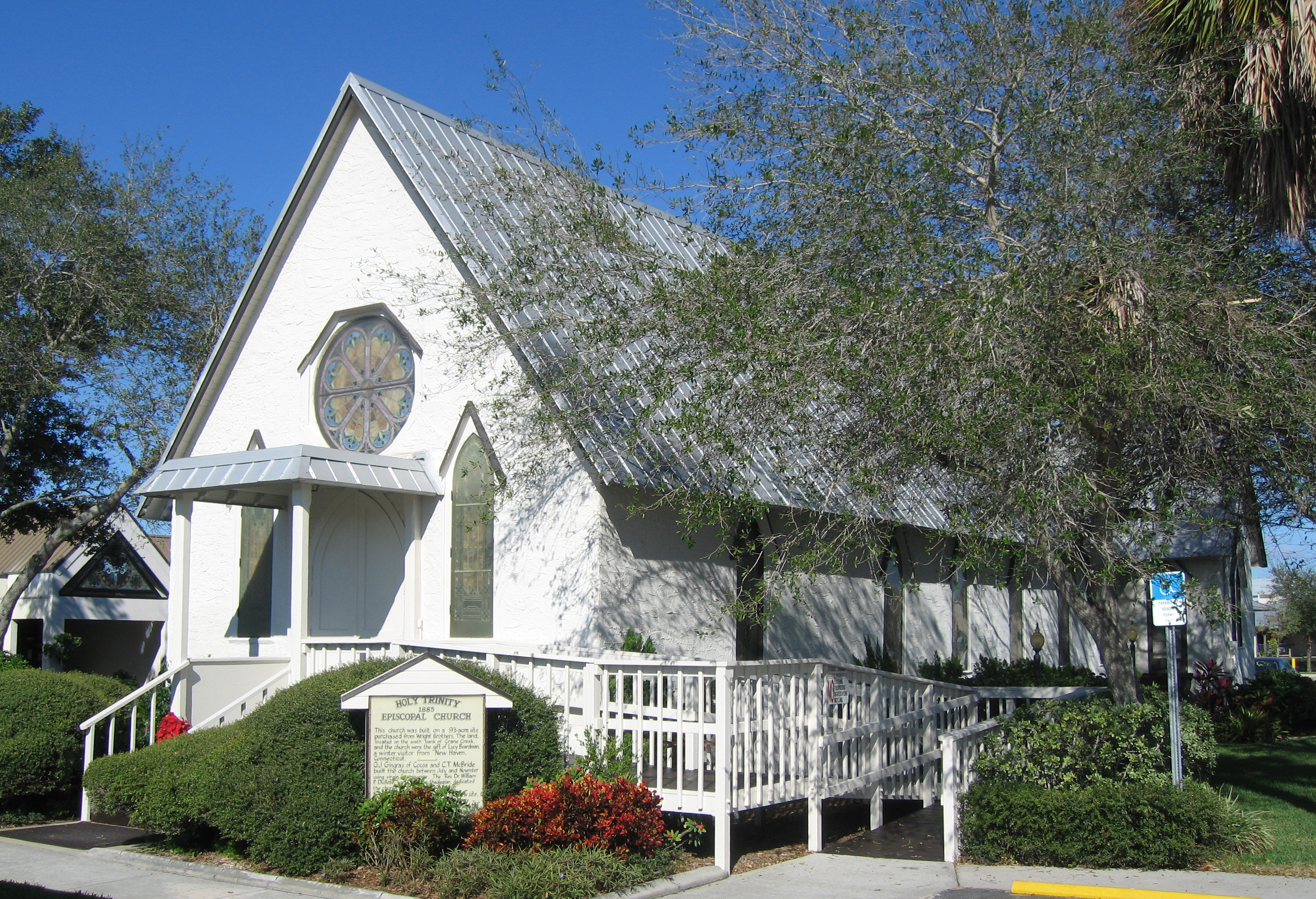

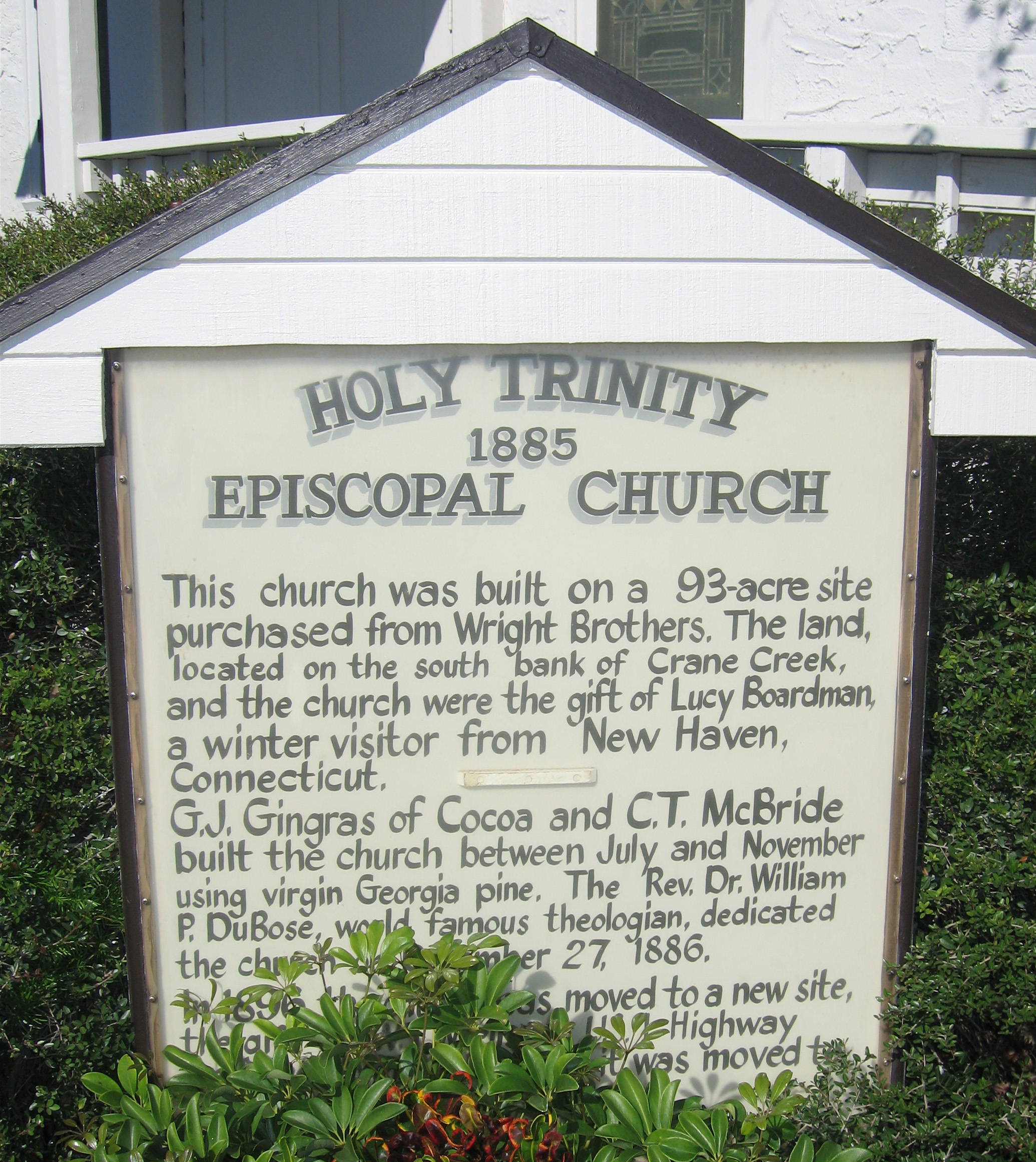
Sign in front of chapel

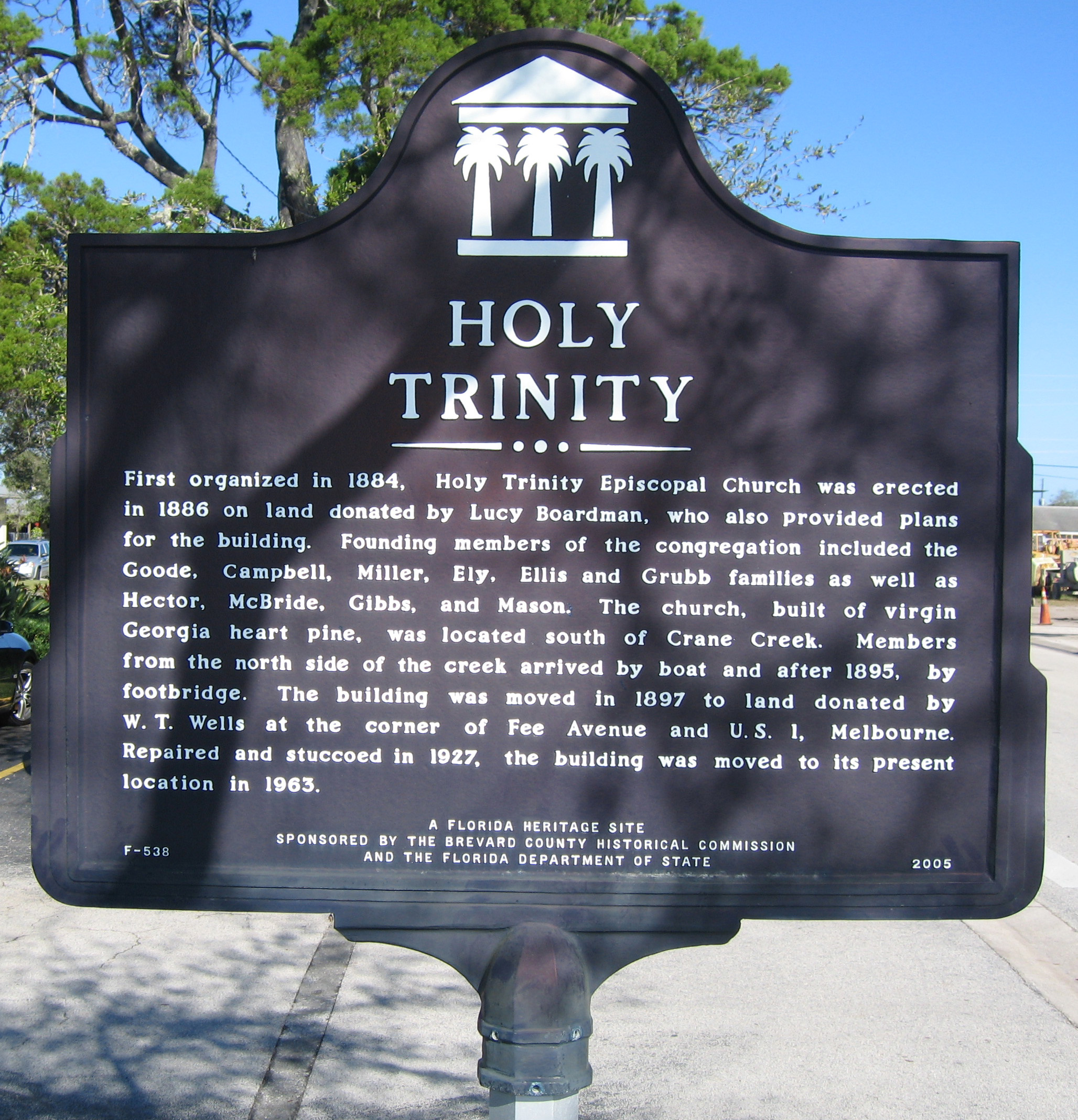
Historical Marker at the church

== See also ==
- Holy Trinity Episcopal Academy
- Holy Trinity Church (disambiguation)
