= Santissima Trinità =

Santissima Trinità (Italian for Most Holy Trinity) may refer to:

- Santissima Trinità, Cattinara
- Santissima Trinità di Cava de’ Tirreni
- Santissima Trinità di Saccargia, Codrongianos
- Santissima Trinità, Lucca
- Santissima Trinità alla Cesarea, Naples
- Santissima Trinità delle Monache, Naples
- Santissima Trinità dei Pellegrini, Naples
- Santissima Trinità degli Spagnoli, Naples
- Santissima Trinità dei Monti, Rome
- Santissima Trinità dei Pellegrini, Rome
- Santissima Trinità a Via Condotti, Rome
- Abbey of the Santissima Trinità (Venosa)
- Santissima Trinità, Verona

== See also ==
- Santa Trinita, a church in Florence, Italy
- Holy Trinity Church (disambiguation)
