= Dârste Church =

Heritage site in Braşov County, Romania

Coordinates: 45°37′00″N 25°39′12″E

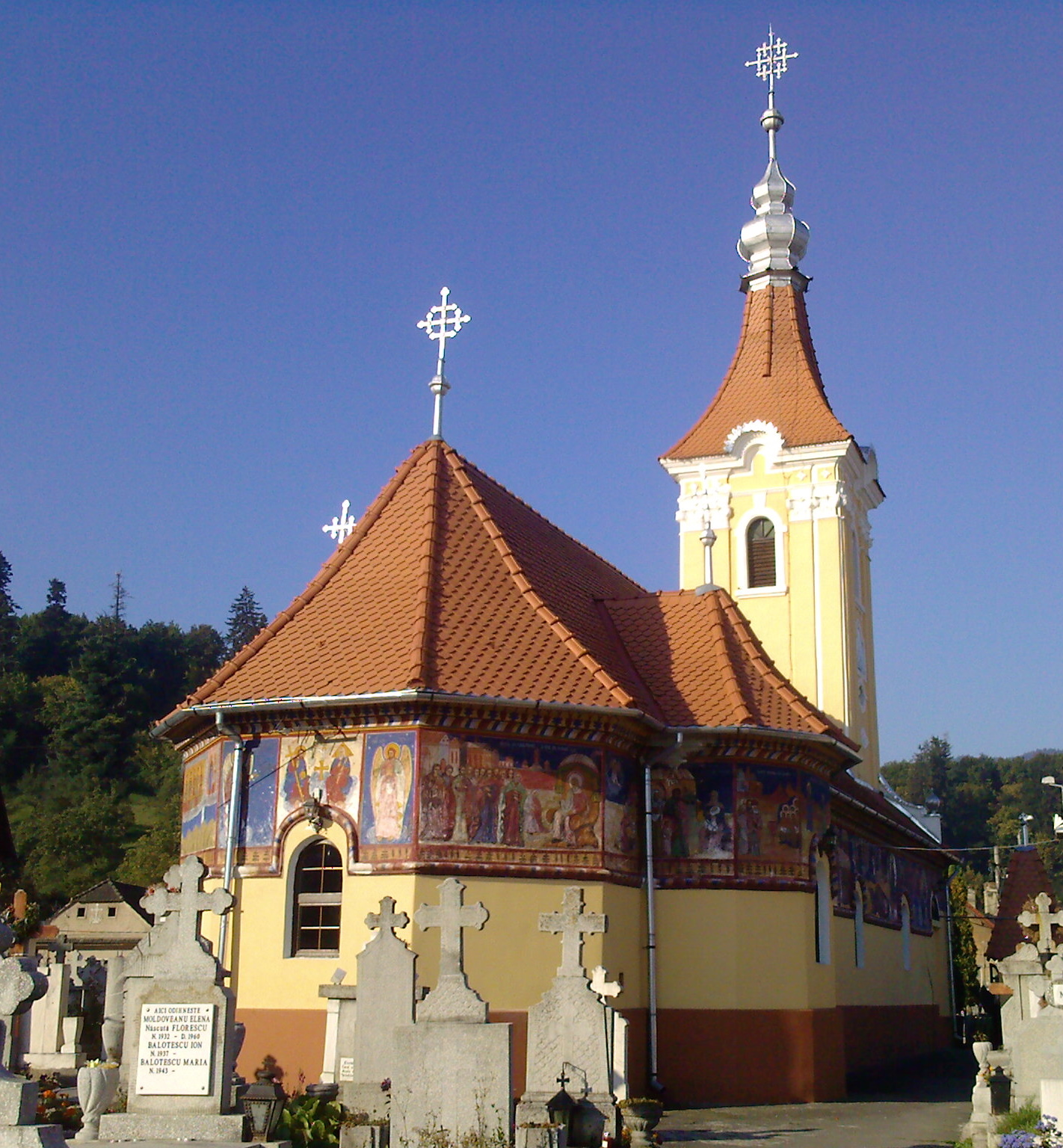
Dârste Church

The Dârste Church is a Romanian Orthodox church located at 255 Calea București, Brașov, Romania. Located in Dârste, a former village that is now a district of Brașov, it is dedicated to the Holy Trinity.

Before the church was built, the local Orthodox community worshiped in Săcele and Brașov. In 1783, during a visit by Joseph II, the villagers handed him a petition requesting permission to establish a church. This was soon granted, and the first ktetor purchased a plot of land. Later, in 1796, Bishop Gerasim Adamović consecrated the church.

The architectural style resembles that of other Orthodox churches in Țara Bârsei. In terms of shape, height and exterior decor, it recalls four historic churches of Săcele. Several icons date to 1784, while the wall frescoes are from 1833. The earliest surviving fresco is in the altar, and shows Jesus lying in the tomb. The painting was restored in the 1970s and again in the 1990s.

The church is listed as a historic monument by Romania's Ministry of Culture and Religious Affairs, which supplies a completion date of 1783.
