= Holy Trinity Church, Kamianets-Podilskyi =

Holy Trinity Church
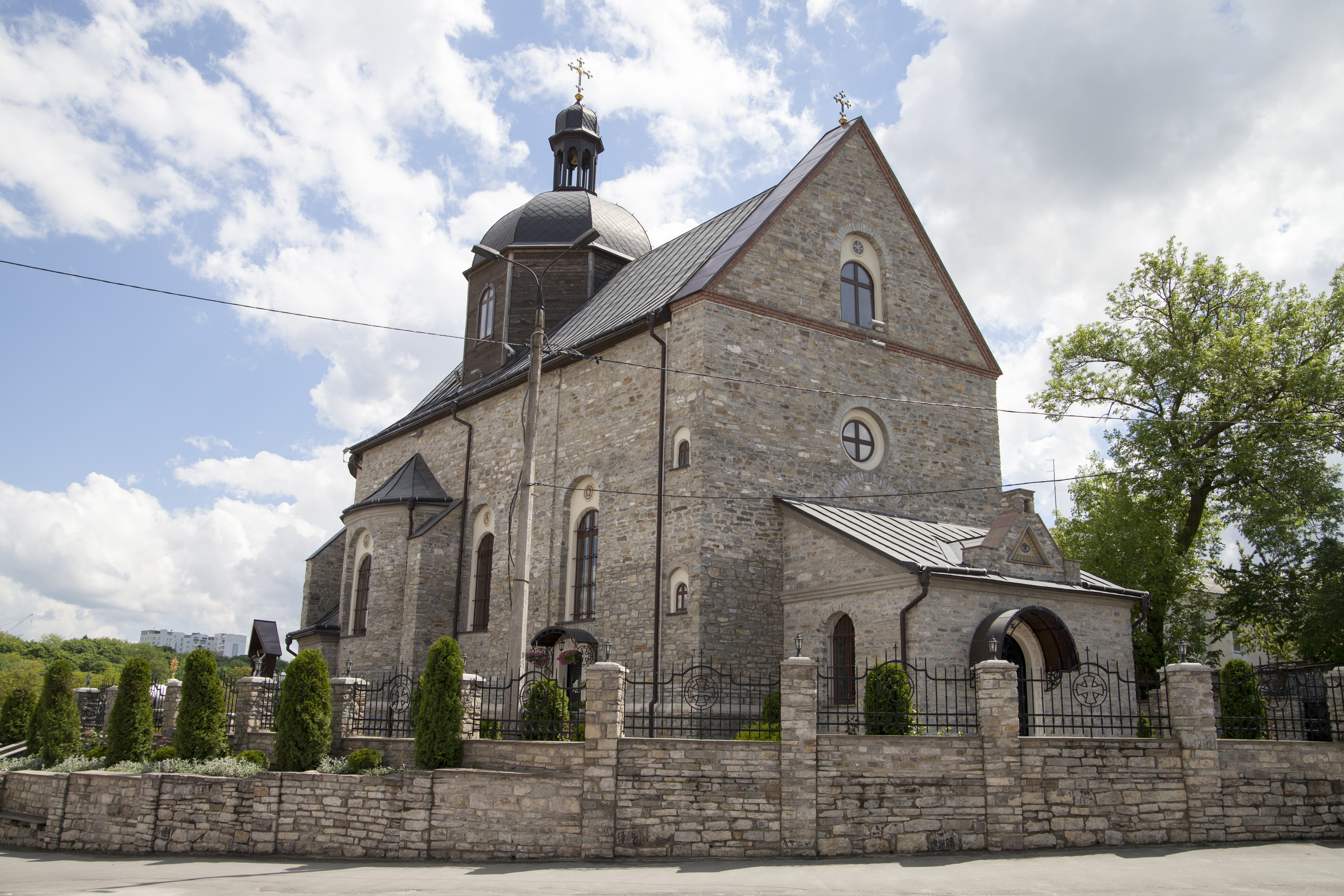
- The Holy Trinity Church was rebuilt in 2006–2008
- Interactive map of the Holy Trinity Church area

General information
- Type: Ukrainian Greek Catholic Church
- Location: Old Town Kamianets-Podilskyi, Ukraine
- Coordinates: 48°40′40″N 26°34′29″E
- Opened: late 16th century

The Holy Trinity Church (Ukrainian: Храм Пресвятої Трійці; Polish: Kościół św. Trójcy) is a church in the city of Kamianets-Podilskyi, Khmelnytskyi Oblast (province) of western Ukraine. The church is situated on Trinity Square near the entrance to the historic Old Town neighborhood of Kamianets-Podilskyi.

Written documents date the Holy Trinity Church back to 1582, although archaeologists have found evidence that the church might even date back to the 14th century. After the Turkish seizure of Kamianets in 1672, the Holy Trinity Church, along with other Orthodox churches in the area, was converted into a Muslim mosque. It remained a mosque until 1699 when it was transferred over to the Uniates when the entire region of Podolia returned to Polish control. The church was one of the oldest in the city and the surrounding region, until its destruction by the Soviets in 1935.

After Ukrainian independence in 1991, the square upon which it sits was renamed from Kuibyshev Square to Trinity Square. In 2006, restoration work commenced, being completed in 2008. On July 10, 2010, the church was consecrated by Vasyl Semeniuk, the eparch of Ternopil – Zboriv of the Ukrainian Greek Catholic Church.

Architecturally, the Holy Trinity Church resembles two other 16th-century Kamianets-Podilskyi churches, the Church of Ss. Peter and Paul, and the Ioanno-Predtechynska Church. It is an oval-shaped construction, with an altar at the east, and a choir room at the south; the church's western portion features a bell tower.
