= Holy Trinity Church, Powai =

Holy Trinity Church
- Holy Trinity Church, Powai
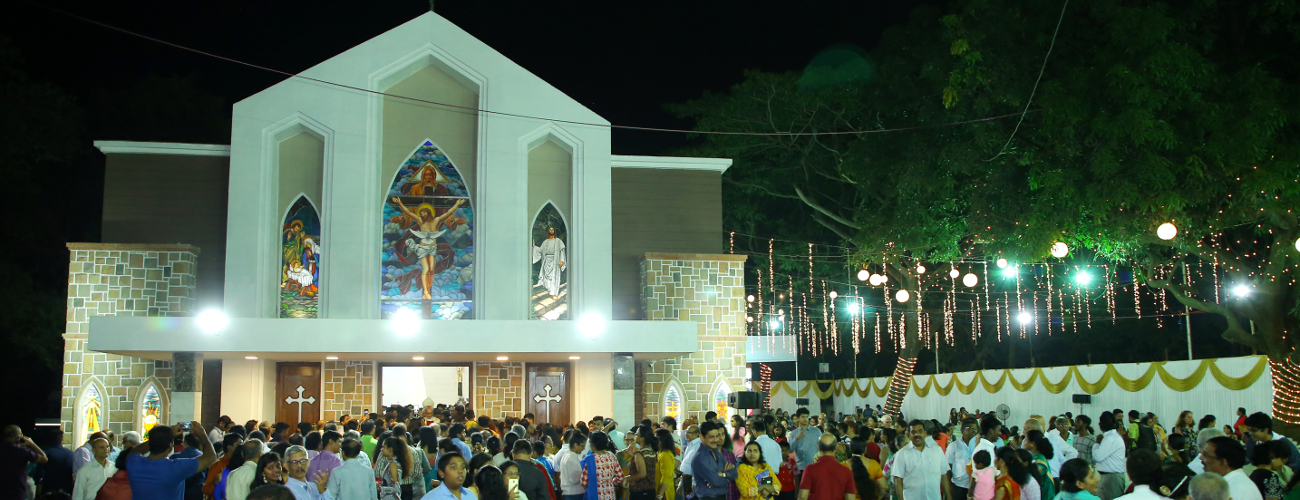
- The faithful celebrating after the renovation and blessing of our Holy Trinity Church
- Holy Trinity Church
- 19°7′46.7″N 72°55′17.3″E
- Location: Powai, Mumbai
- Country: India
- Denomination: Roman Catholic
- Website: http://holytrinitychurchpowai.com/

History
- Status: Parish Church
- Founded: 1557

Architecture
- Functional status: Active

Administration
- Archdiocese: Archdiocese of Bombay
- Deanery: Thane Deanery
- Parish: Holy Trinity Parish

Clergy
- Archbishop: Oswald Cardinal Gracias
- Bishop: Rev. Fr. Allwyn D’Silva
- Priest: Fr. Michael Pinto (Principal - St. Xavier’s School)

Holy Trinity Church or the Most Holy Trinity is a Roman Catholic church in Powai, a suburb of Mumbai. It was built during the Portuguese era by the Jesuits in 1557 and belongs to the Archdiocese of Bombay.

== Gallery ==
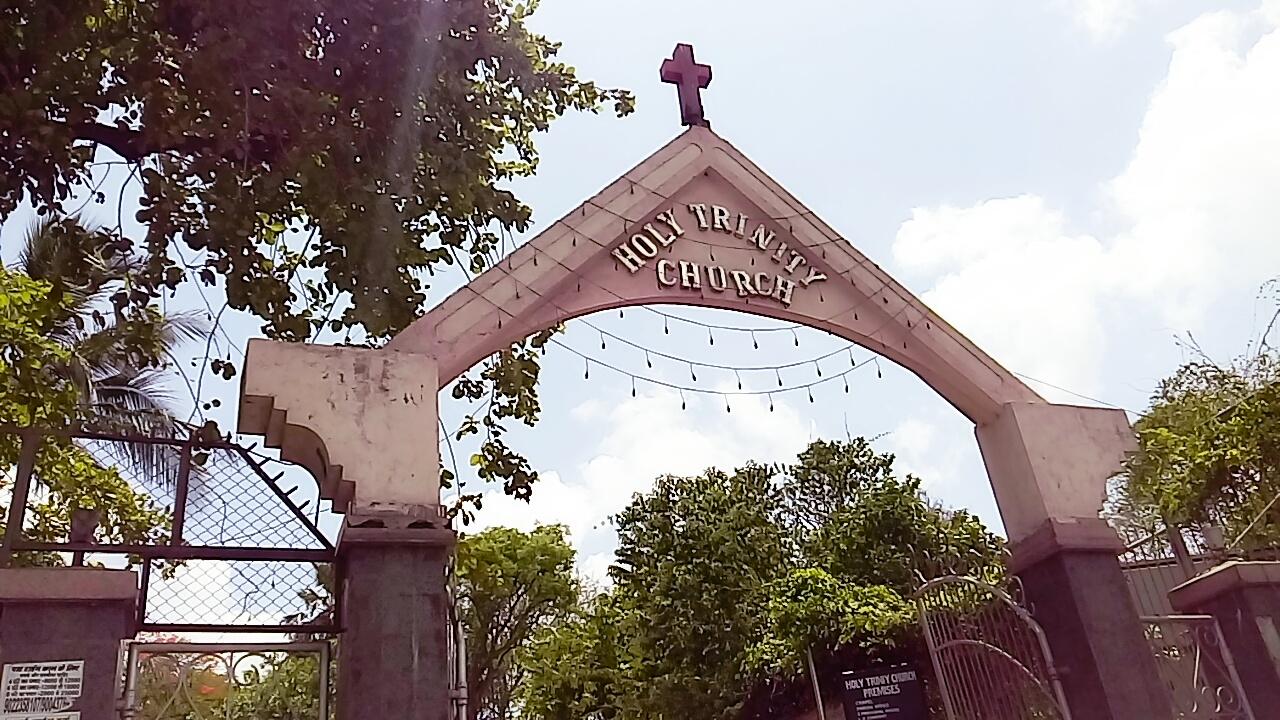
Main entrance

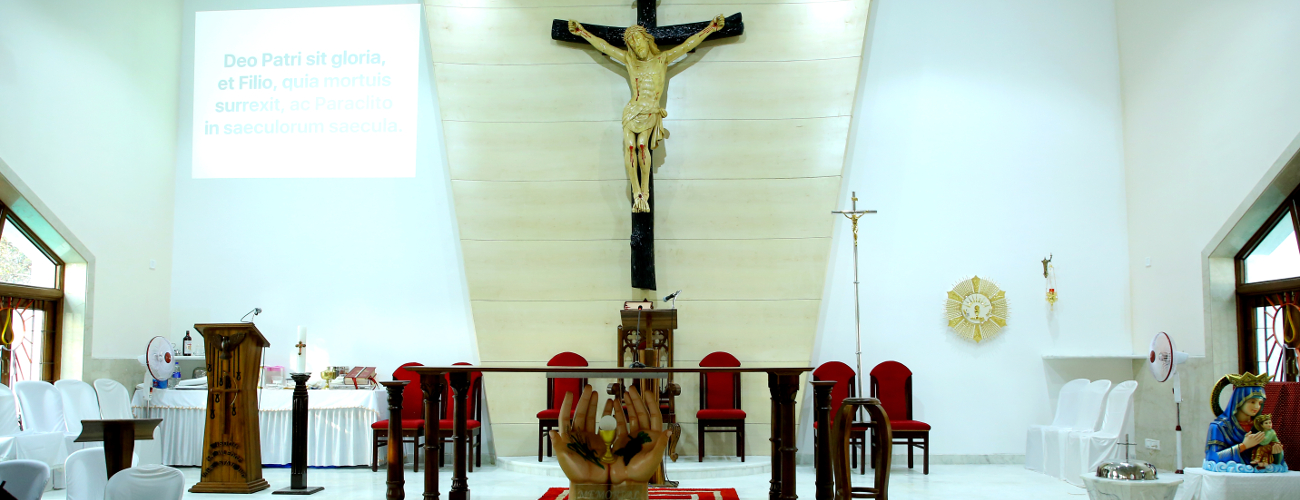
Main altar of the renovated church

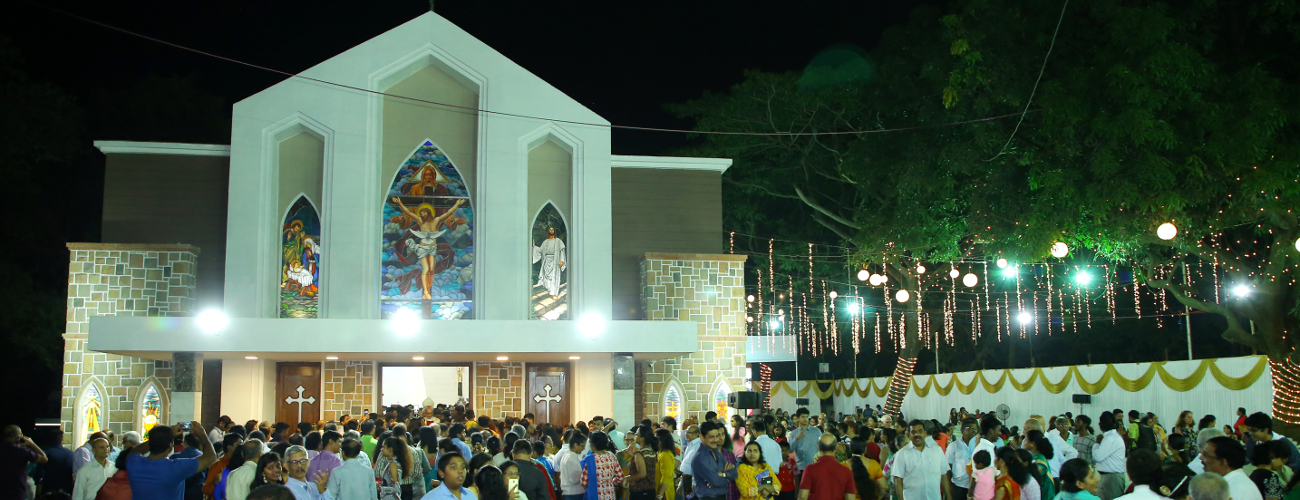
Church exterior

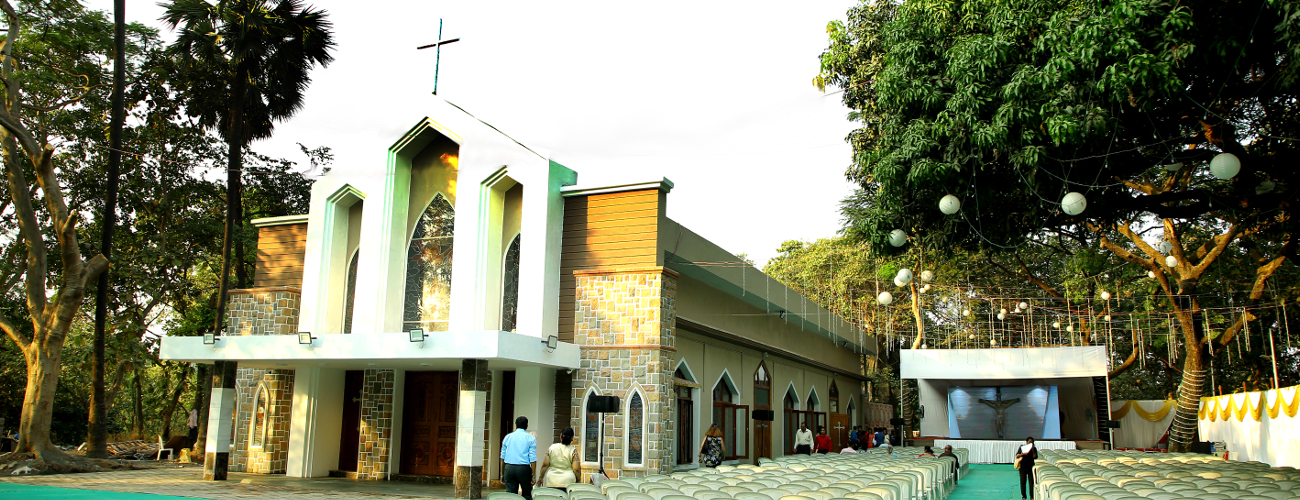
Renovated church

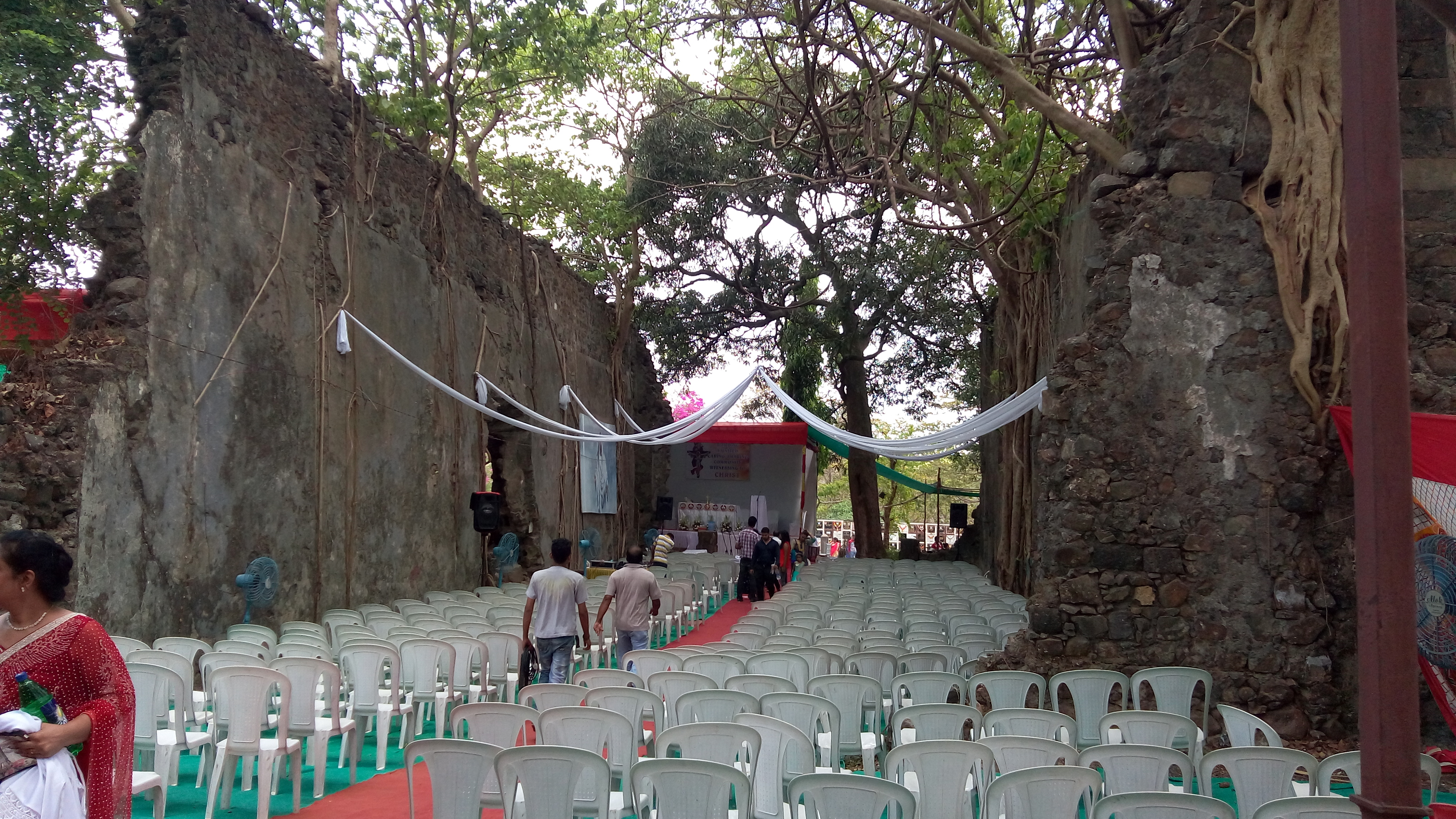
Old church

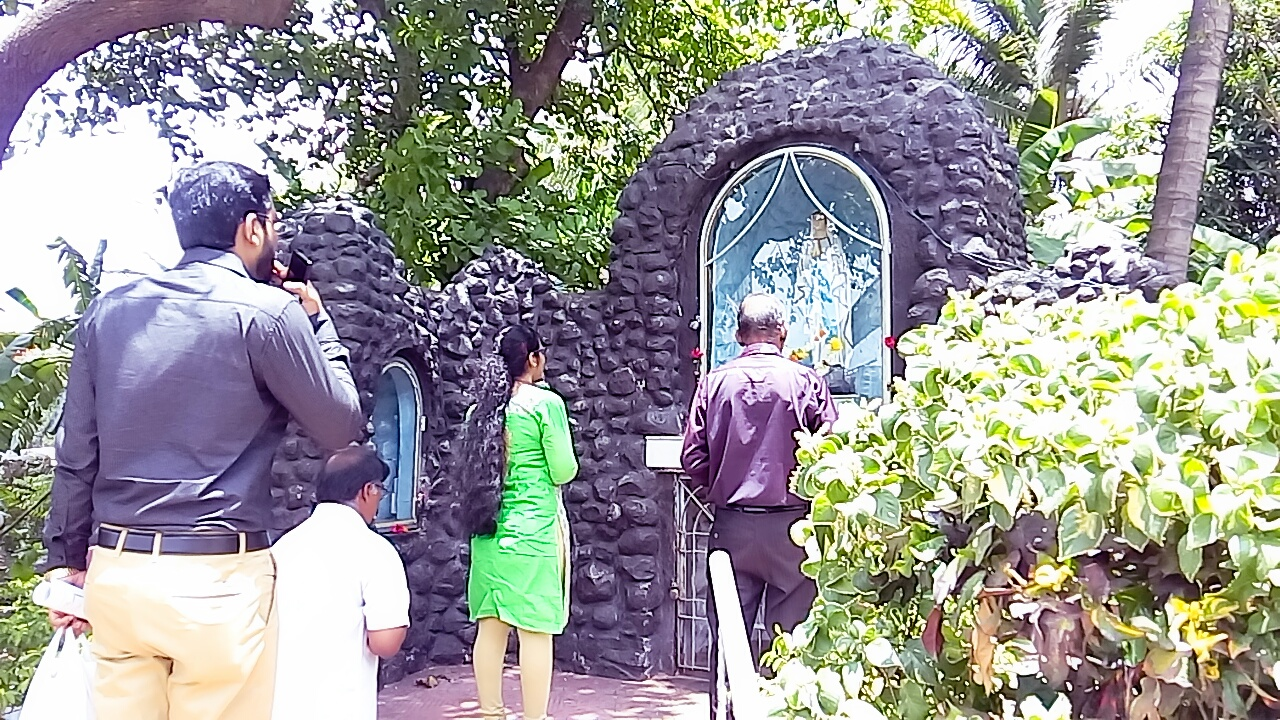
Church grotto

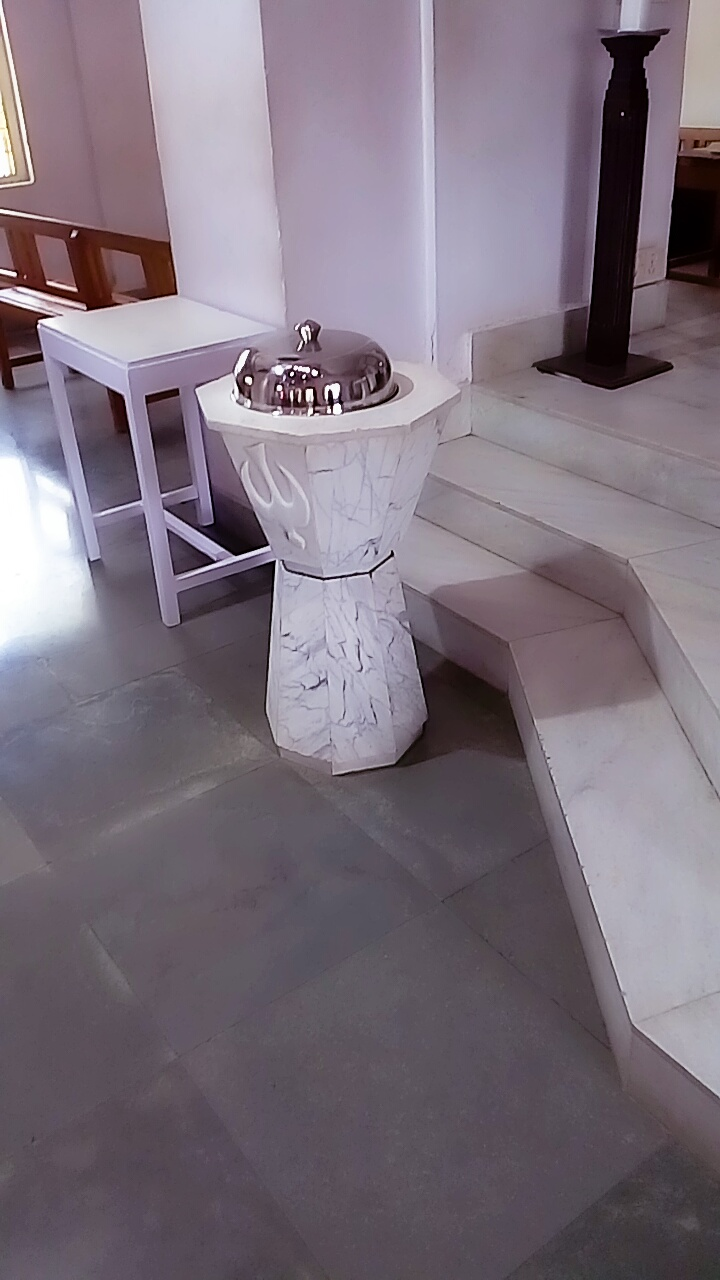
baptismal font

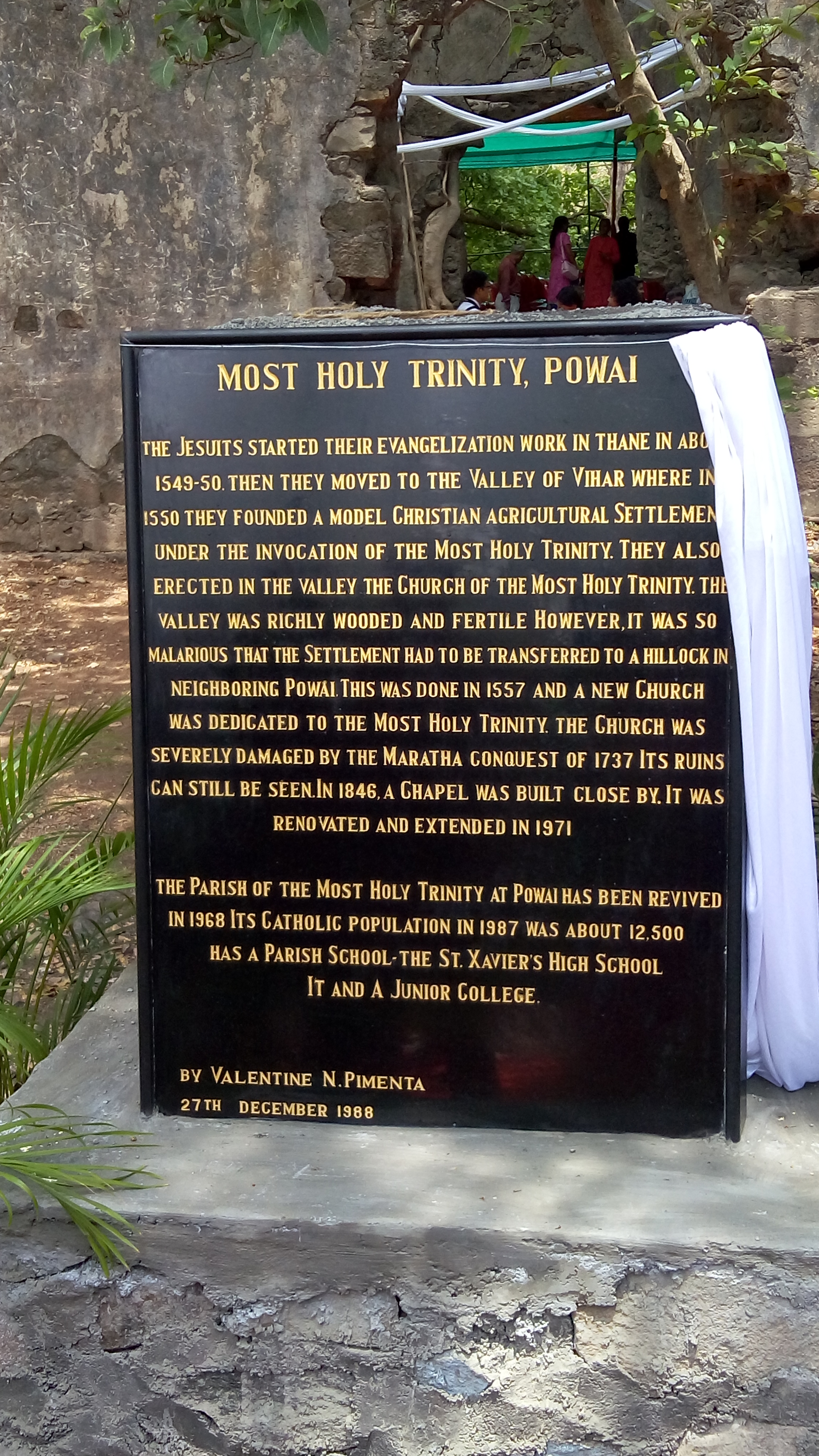
Information stone

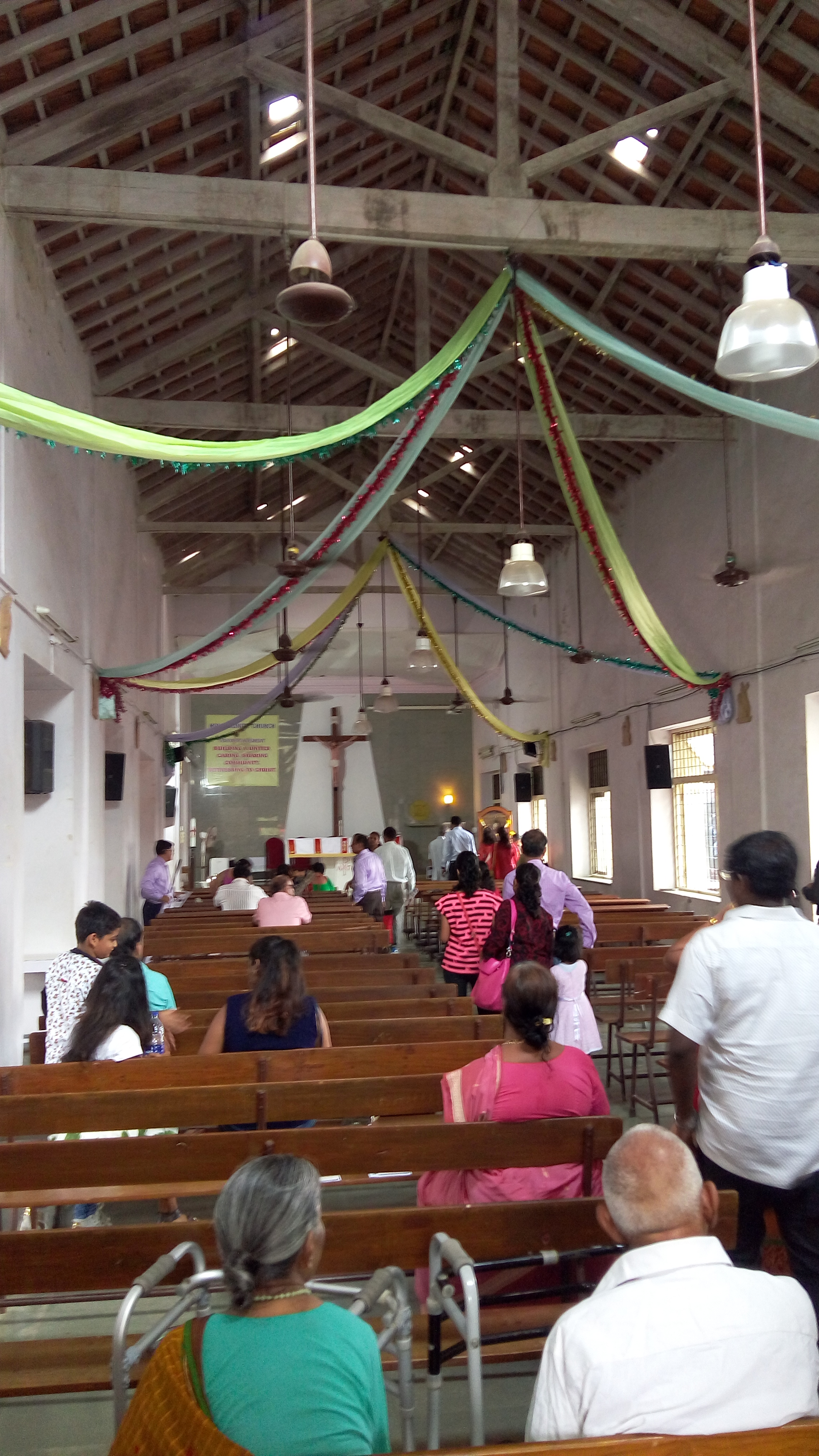
Old church

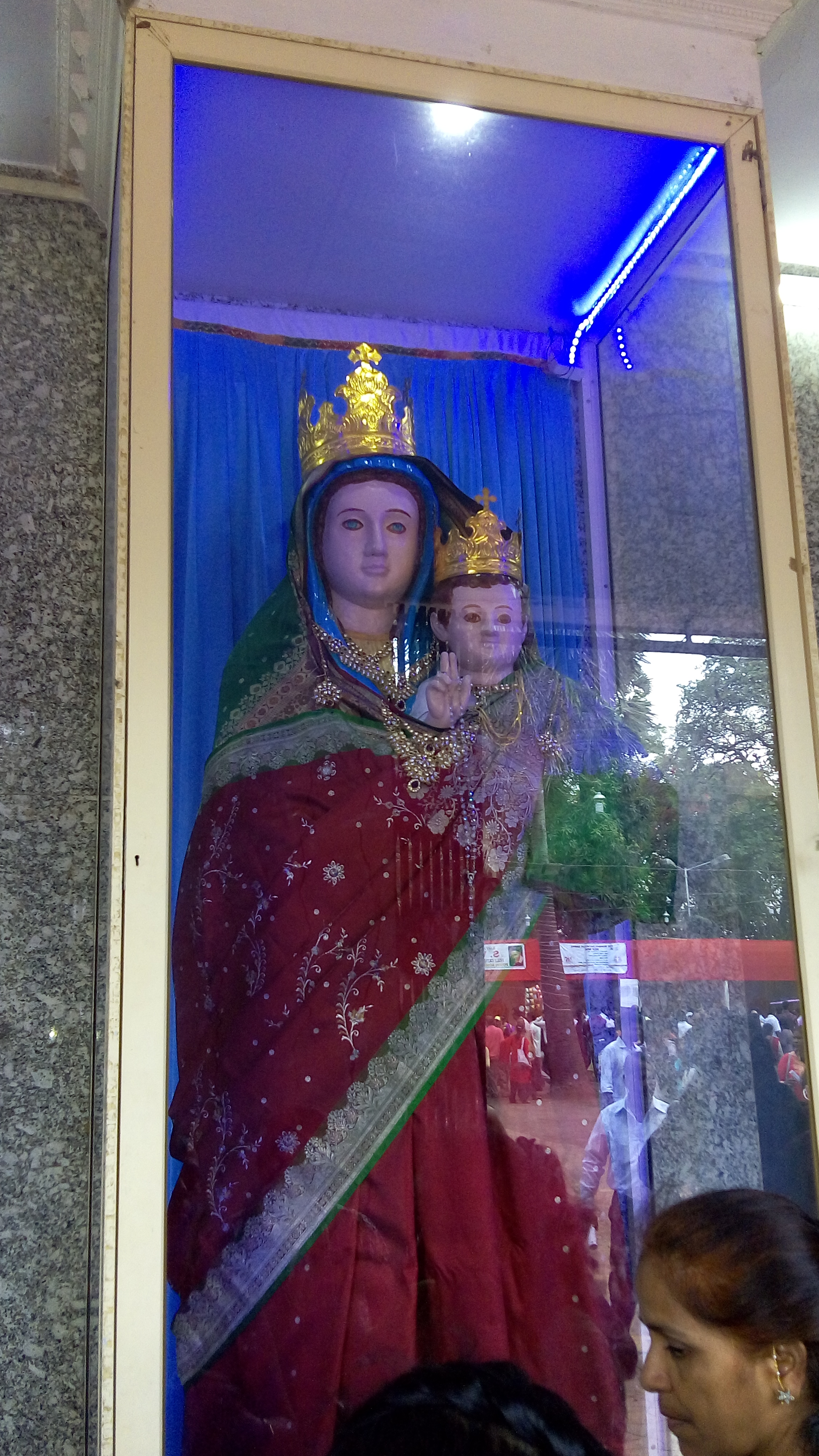
Mary statue

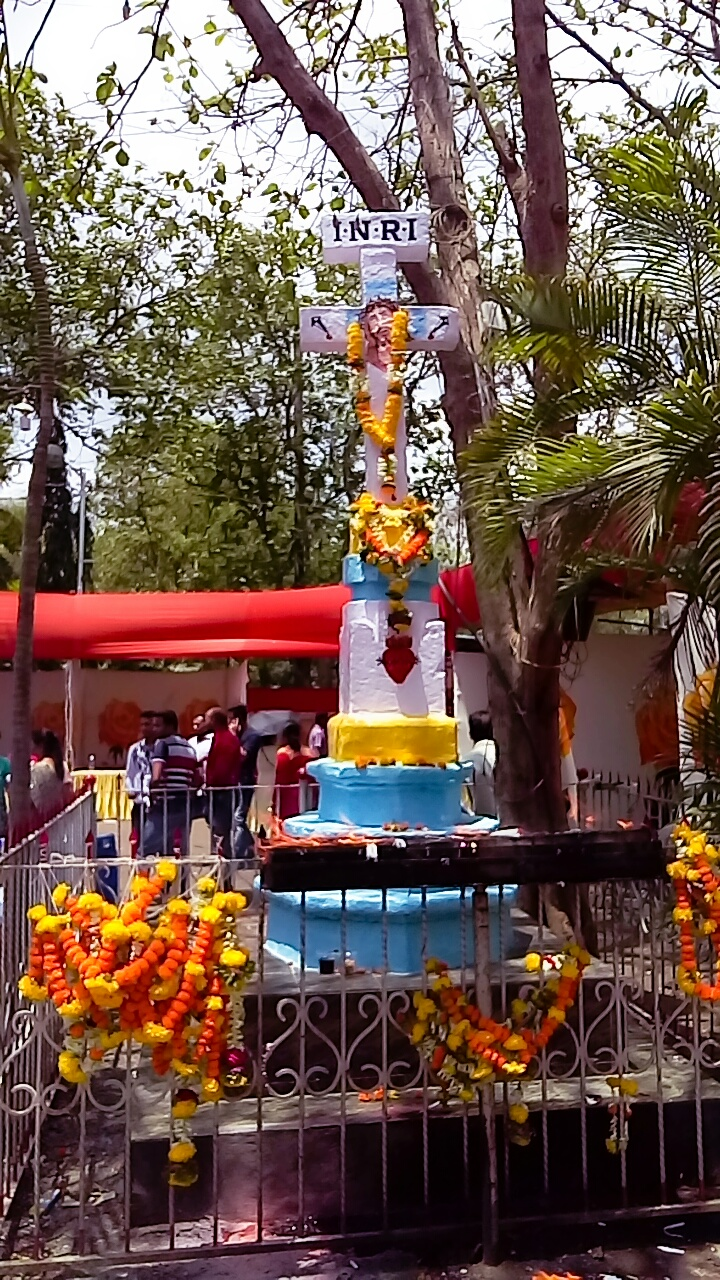
Cross at the church facade

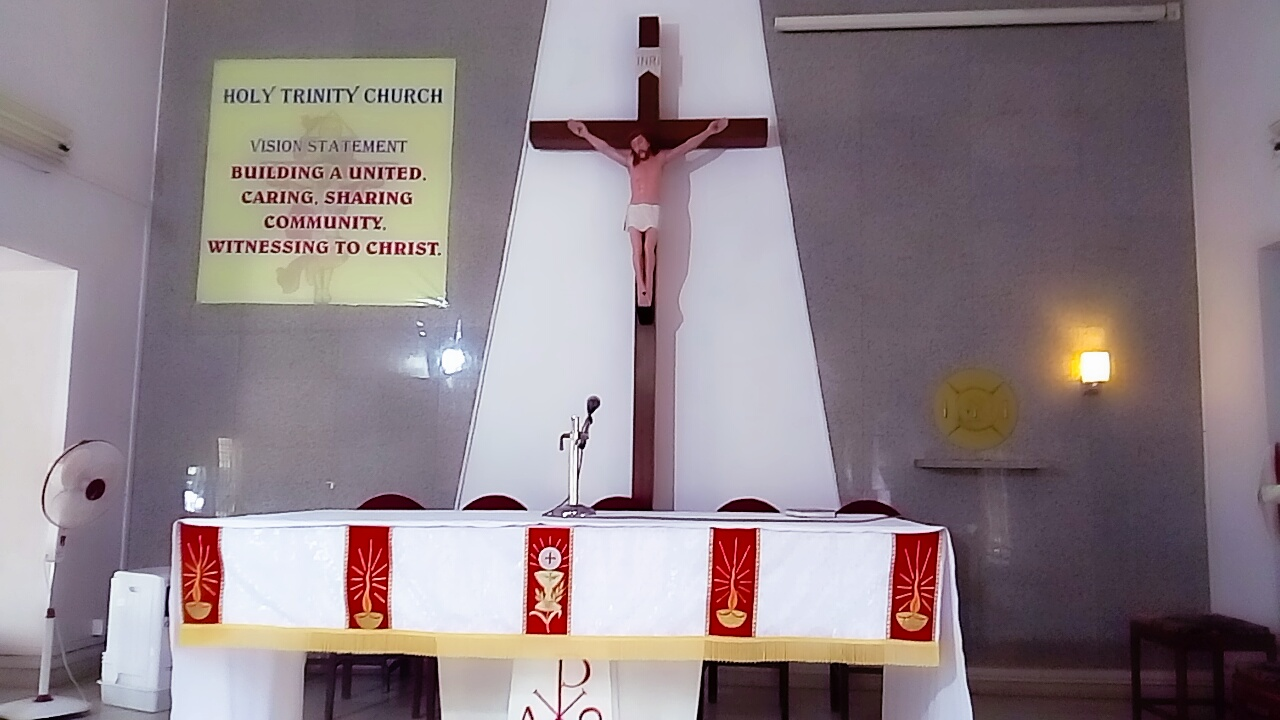
Main altar of the old church
