= Holy Trinity Church, Ajaccio =

Church in Corsica, France

- Église de la Sainte-Trinité d'Ajaccio (in French)
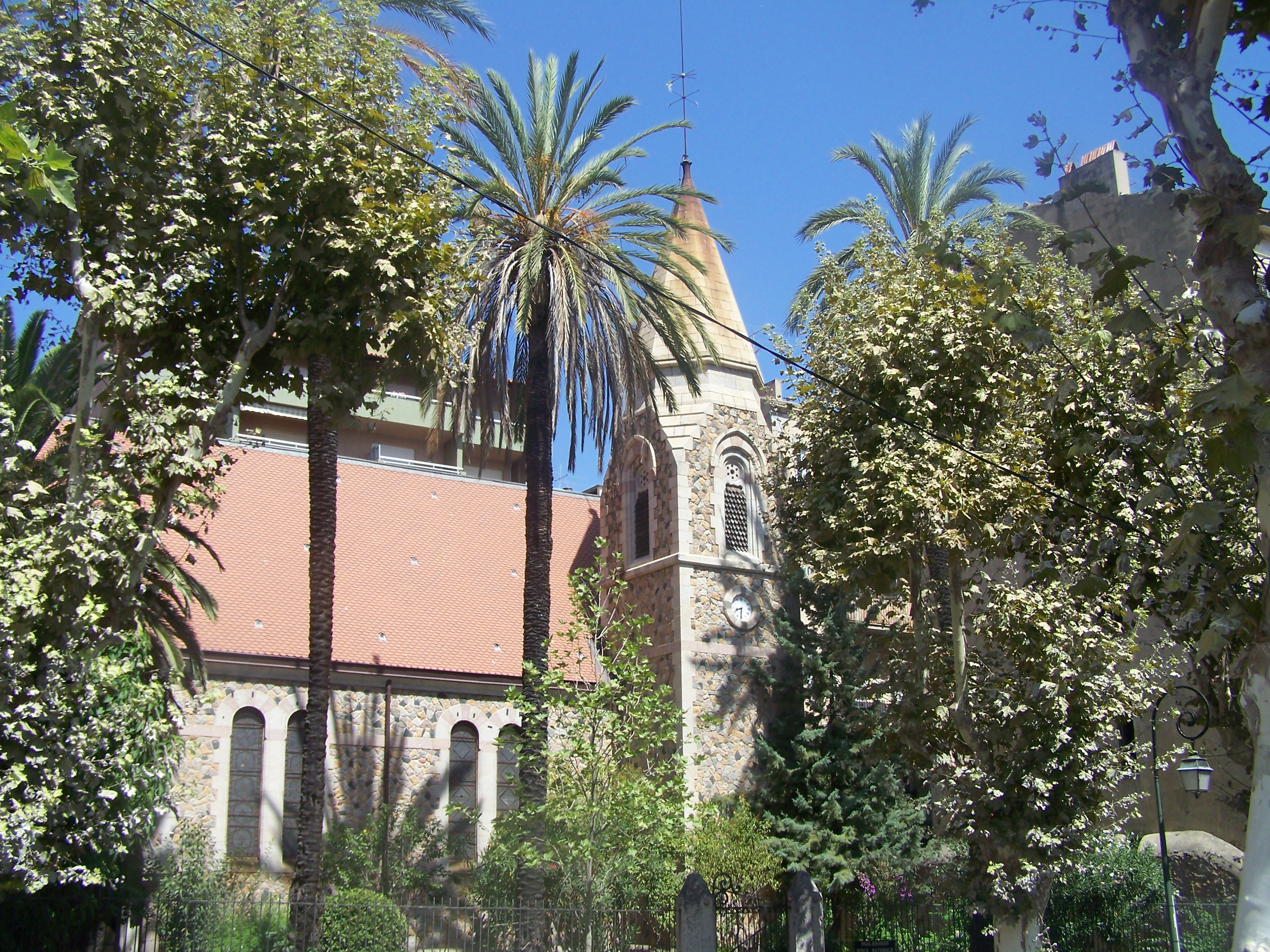

Religion
- Affiliation: Anglican Church
- Rite: Anglican

Location
- Location: Ajaccio,Corsica
- Interactive map of Holy Trinity Church, Ajaccio
- Coordinates: 41°55′04″N 08°43′49″E

Architecture
- Type: church

Anglican Church, officially the Holy Trinity Church of Ajaccio (French: Église de la Sainte-Trinité d'Ajaccio) is located in the "Quartier des étrangers" in Ajaccio, Corsica.

== History ==
The church opened for worship in 1878, thanks to Miss Thomasina Campbell, to serve as a place of worship for tourists from Britain to indulge their faith freely and between people of the same faith. In the 19th century the city was very popular with tourists, especially the British. The church was built of local granite.

The church no longer fulfils its original role, but is the property of Ajaccio; it is now the place of the national school of music.
