= Holy Trinity Orthodox Church, Riga =

Church building in Riga, Latvia

Holy Trinity Orthodox Church
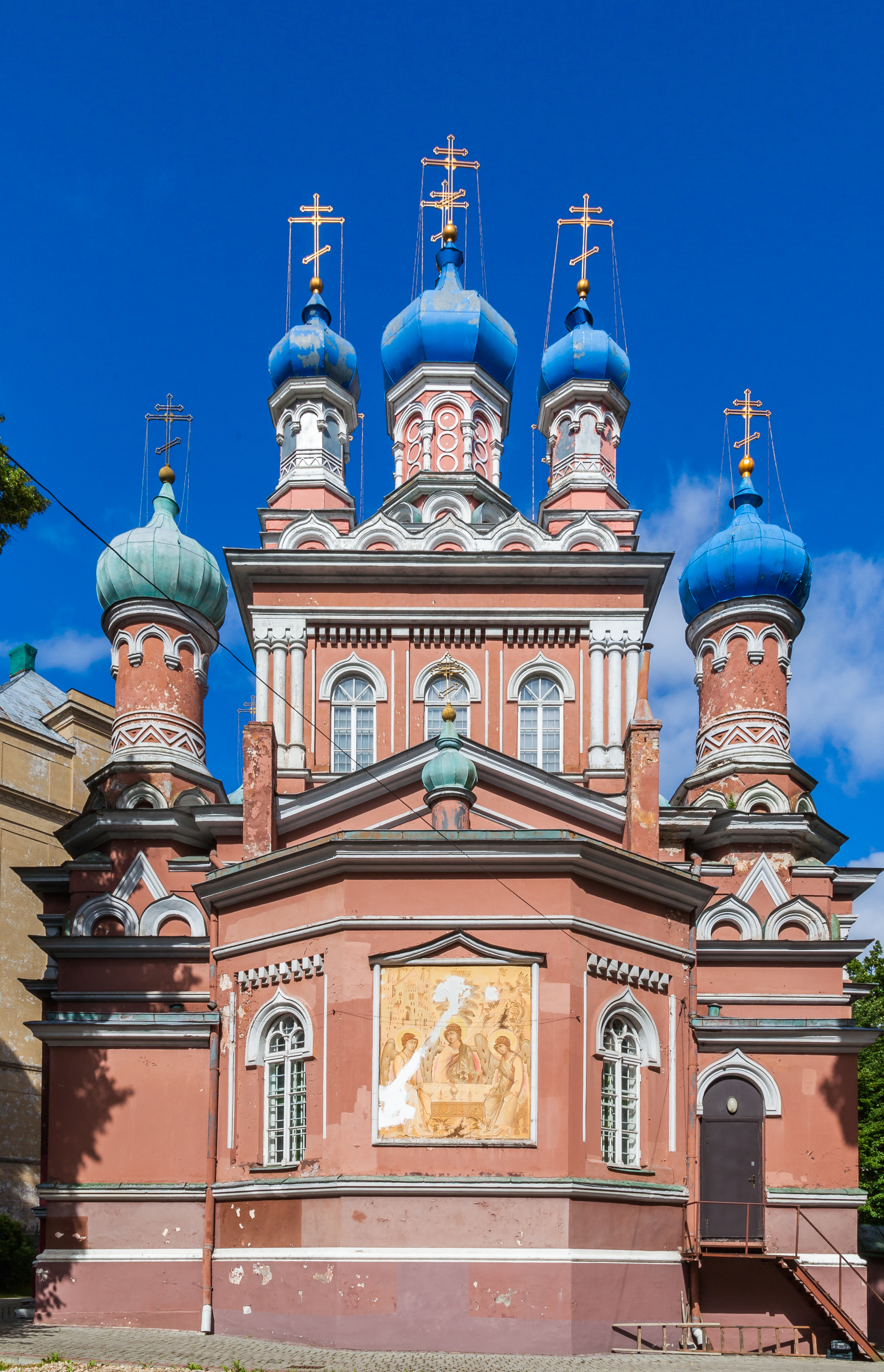

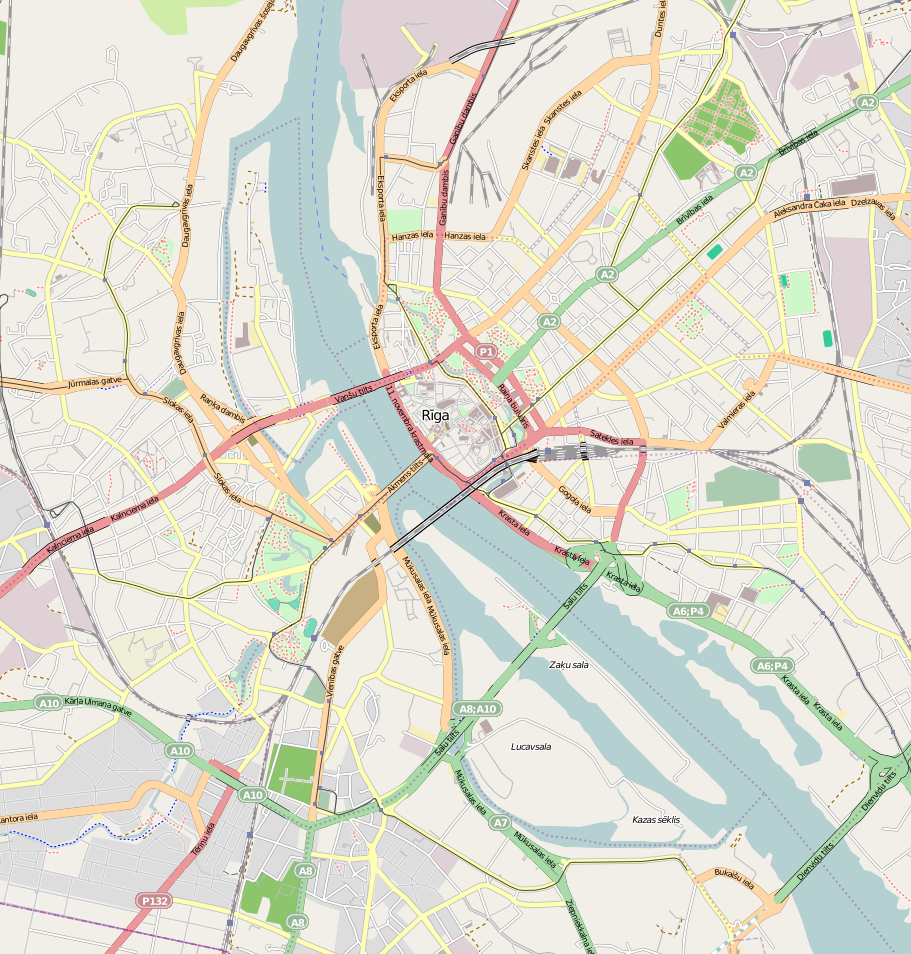
- Location within Riga
- 56°56′38.21″N 24°4′53.38″E
- Location: Riga
- Country: Latvia
- Denomination: Eastern Orthodox

Holy Trinity Orthodox Church (Latvian: Svētās Trīsvienības Pārdaugavas pareizticīgo baznīca) is an Eastern Orthodox church in Riga, the capital of Latvia. The church is situated in Pārdaugava at the address 2 Meža Street.
