= Holy Trinity Lutheran Church =

Holy Trinity Lutheran Church may refer to:

- Holy Trinity Lutheran Church (Lancaster, Pennsylvania)
- Holy Trinity Lutheran Church (Manhattan)
- Holy Trinity Lutheran Church, Riga
