= Holy Trinity Roman Catholic Church (Hartford, Connecticut) =

Holy Trinity Church
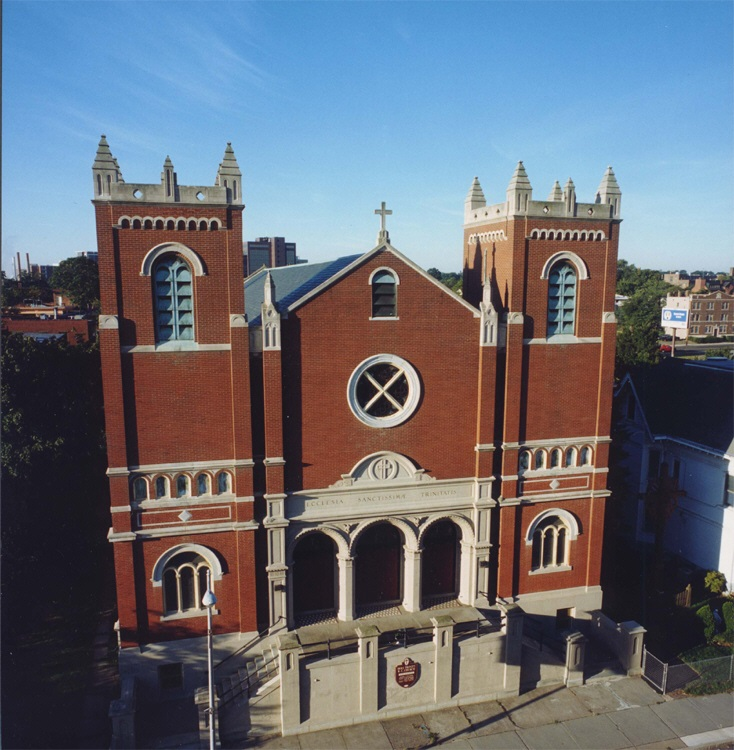
- Hartford Holy Trinity Roman Catholic Church, 2000
- Holy Trinity Church
- 41°45′39.4″N 72°40′36.1″W
- Location: 53 Capitol Avenue; Hartford, Connecticut
- Country: United States
- Denomination: Roman Catholic
- Website: www.holytrinityhartford.org

History
- Status: Mission church
- Founded: 1900
- Founder: Lithuanian immigrants
- Dedication: Holy Trinity
- Dedicated: March 18, 1928

Architecture
- Functional status: Active
- Architectural type: Church
- Style: Romanesque Revival
- Groundbreaking: 1912
- Completed: March 1927

Specifications
- Materials: Brick

Clergy
- Priest: Rev. Charles E. Jacobs

Holy Trinity Roman Catholic Church is a parish church in the Archdiocese of Hartford located in Hartford, Connecticut, United States. The parish was founded by Lithuanian immigrants within the 20th century. Construction of the church began in 1912.

== History ==
Lithuanians began settling in the Hartford, Connecticut area in the 1890s. In 1894, Father Joseph Zebris, who had been celebrating Mass in Waterbury, Connecticut, began his mission in Hartford, where 20 Lithuanian families had already settled. Father Zebris, founded "The Sons of Lithuania Society" in Hartford in 1896, under the patronage of St. John the Baptist.

In June 1898, Father Zebris was appointed as pastor of a church in New Britain. During the 19th century, many Lithuanians came to the Eastern United States. About 80 immigrants settled in Hartford. Father Zebris organized a meeting for all Lithuanian Hartfordites and those from Windsor and Poquonock to discuss offering Mass on Sundays in Hartford. The immigrants held a July 4 bazaar, and from the proceeds were able to rent a large room in a building on the corner of Sheldon and Main Street. They celebrated their first Mass there on July 17, 1898.
