= Holy Trinity Church, Tarleton =

Coordinates: 53.67743°N 2.832295°W

Holy Trinity Church
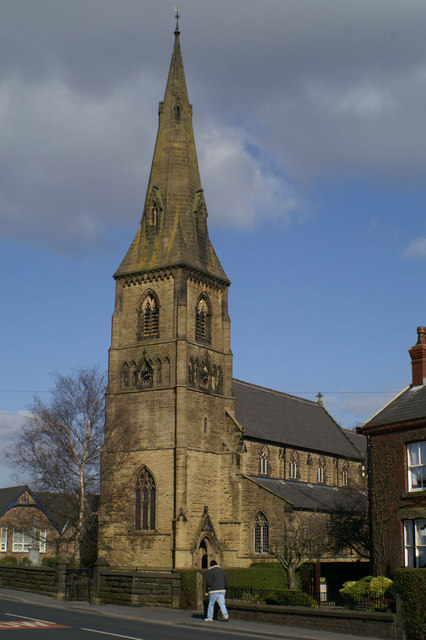
- Holy Trinity Church, Tarleton

- Location in West Lancashire
- OS grid reference: SD 45118 20427
- Location: Tarleton, Lancashire
- Country: England
- Denomination: Anglican

History
- Status: Parish church
- Consecrated: 1888

Architecture
- Functional status: Active
- Architectural type: Church
- Completed: 1886
- Construction cost: £6,138

Specifications
- Length: 117 feet 5 inches (35.79 m)
- Width: 63 feet (19.202400 m)
- Materials: Stone and a Slate roof

Holy Trinity Church, Tarleton is an Anglican church which stands in the village of Tarleton, Lancashire, England.

The church was built in 1886 to replace the old St Mary's Church on the edge of the village, which was no longer big enough for the local population to attend. The cost to build Holy Trinity was £6,138. The steeple and bells cost £2,600. The repair of the steeple in 1968 cost £3,500.
