= Church of the Holy Trinity, Panevėžys =

Roman Catholic church in Aukštaitija, Lithuania

Church of the Holy Trinity Švč. Trejybės bažnyčia
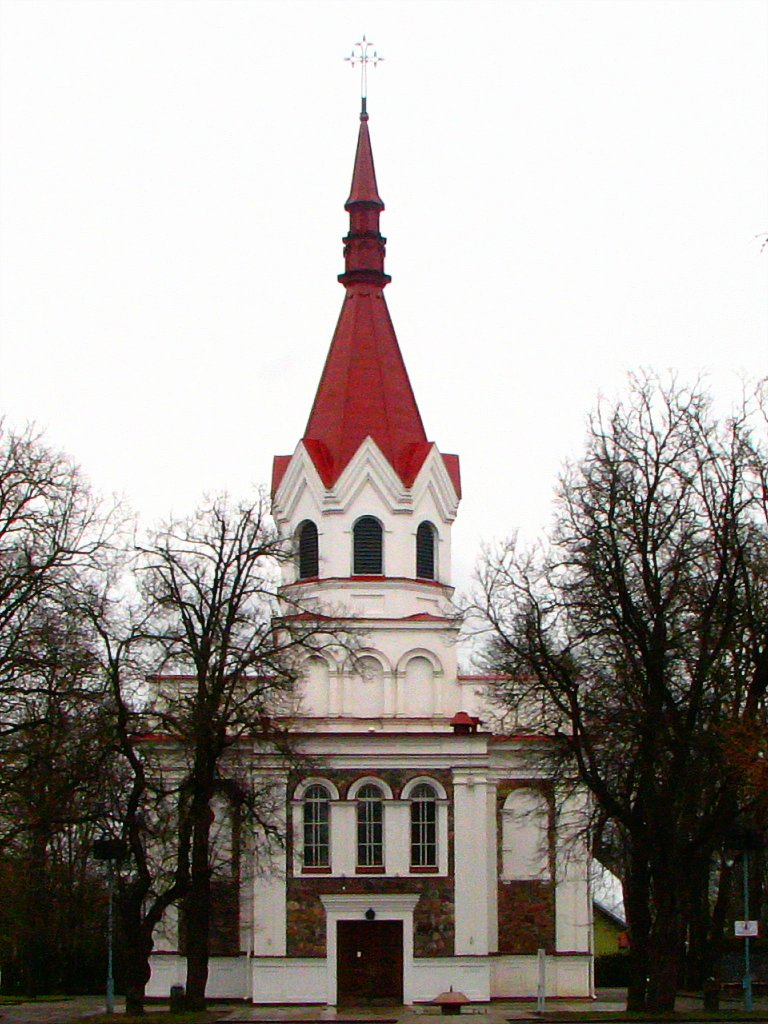
- Front façade of Holy Trinity's

Religion
- Affiliation: Roman Catholic
- Leadership: Roman Catholic Diocese of Panevėžys

Location
- Location: Panevėžys, Lithuania
- Interactive map of Church of the Holy Trinity; Švč. Trejybės bažnyčia
- Coordinates: 55°43′35.62″N 24°21′29.56″E

Architecture
- Type: Church
- Style: Classicism
- Completed: 1803
- Materials: Stone masonry

Website
- Paneveziovyskupija.lt

The Church of the Holy Trinity (Lithuanian: Švč. Trejybės bažnyčia) is a Roman Catholic church in Panevėžys, Lithuania. It was built in 1803 by the Piarists, along with a monastery and a college.

== Gallery ==
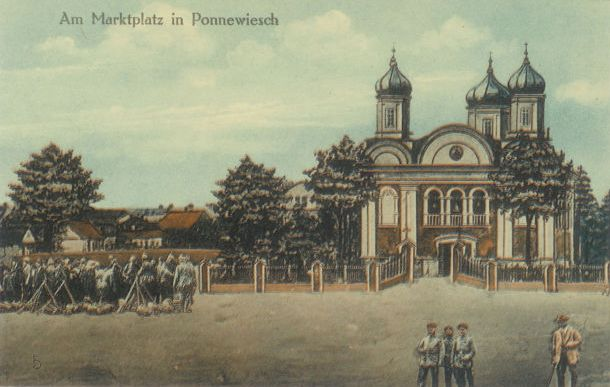
View of the church when it was converted into an Eastern Orthodox church

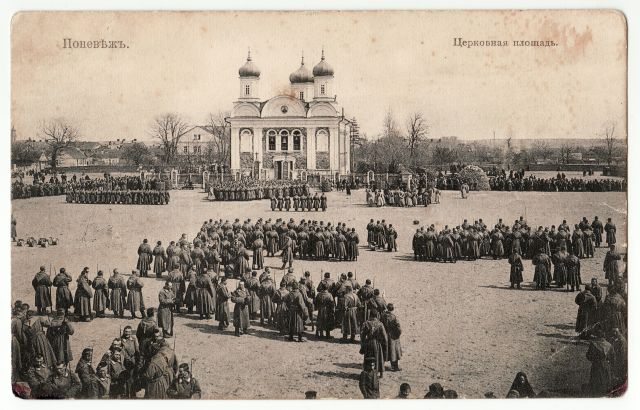
Soldiers near the church during the Russian Empire occupation period

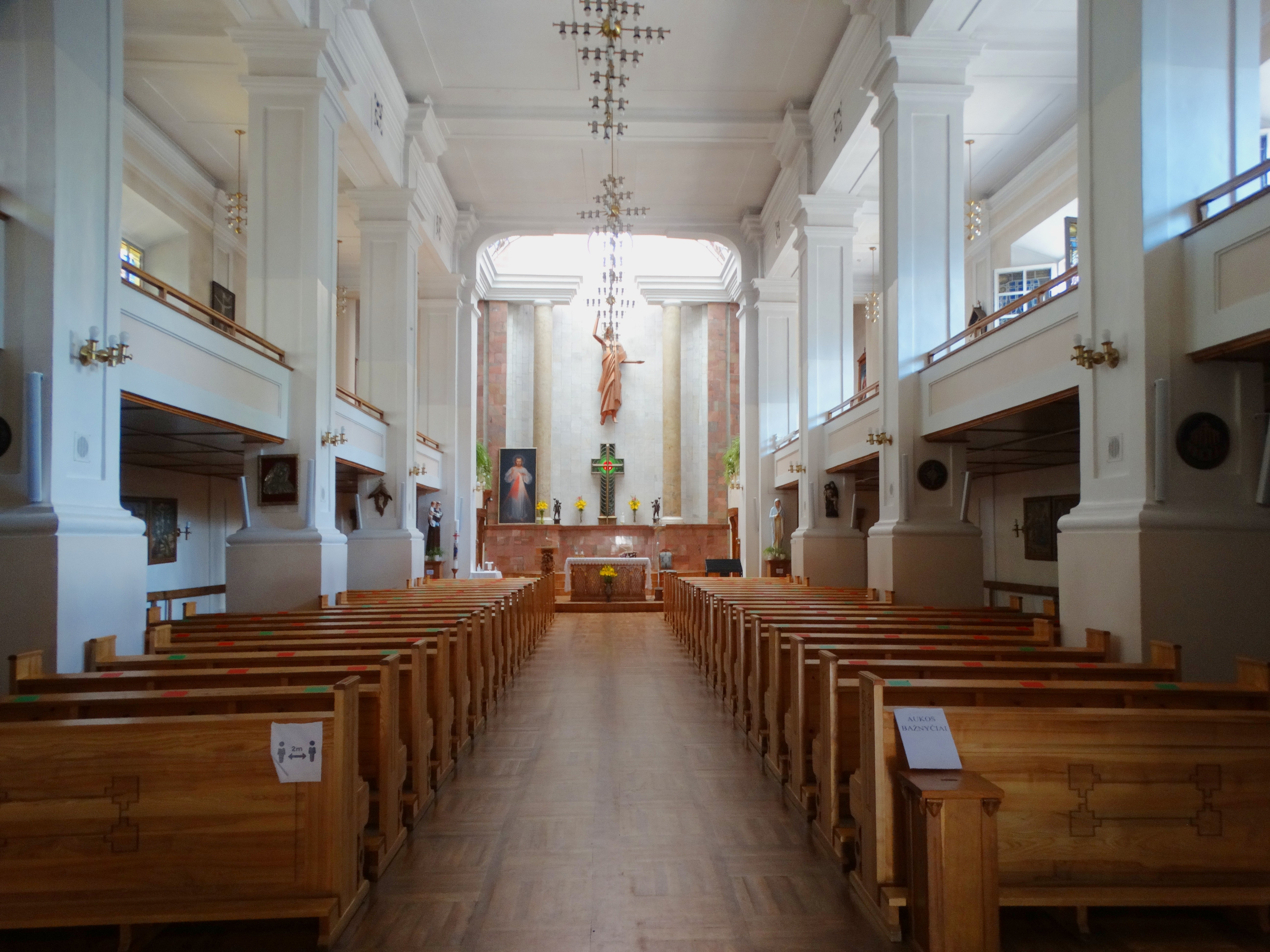
Interior

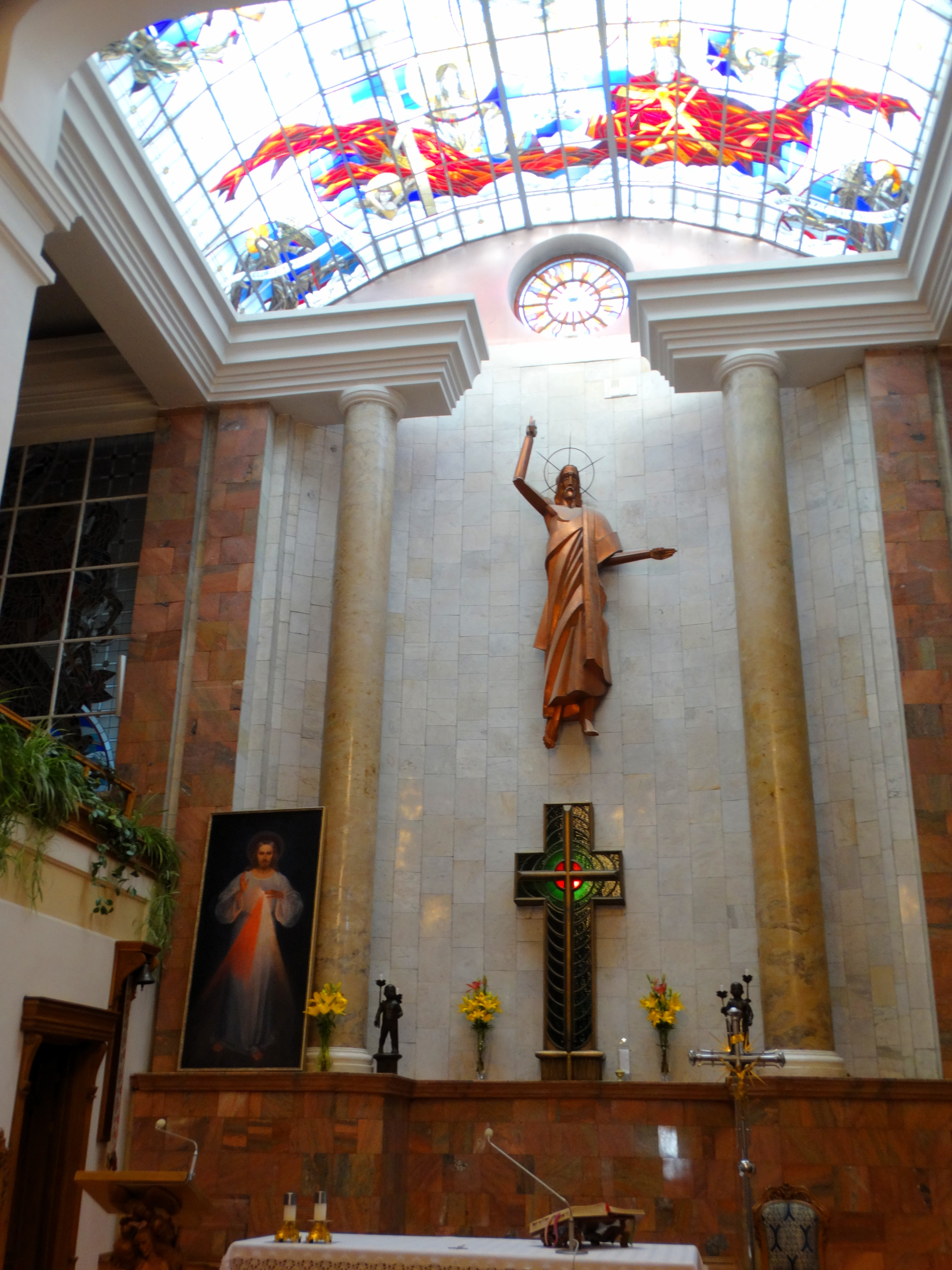
Altar

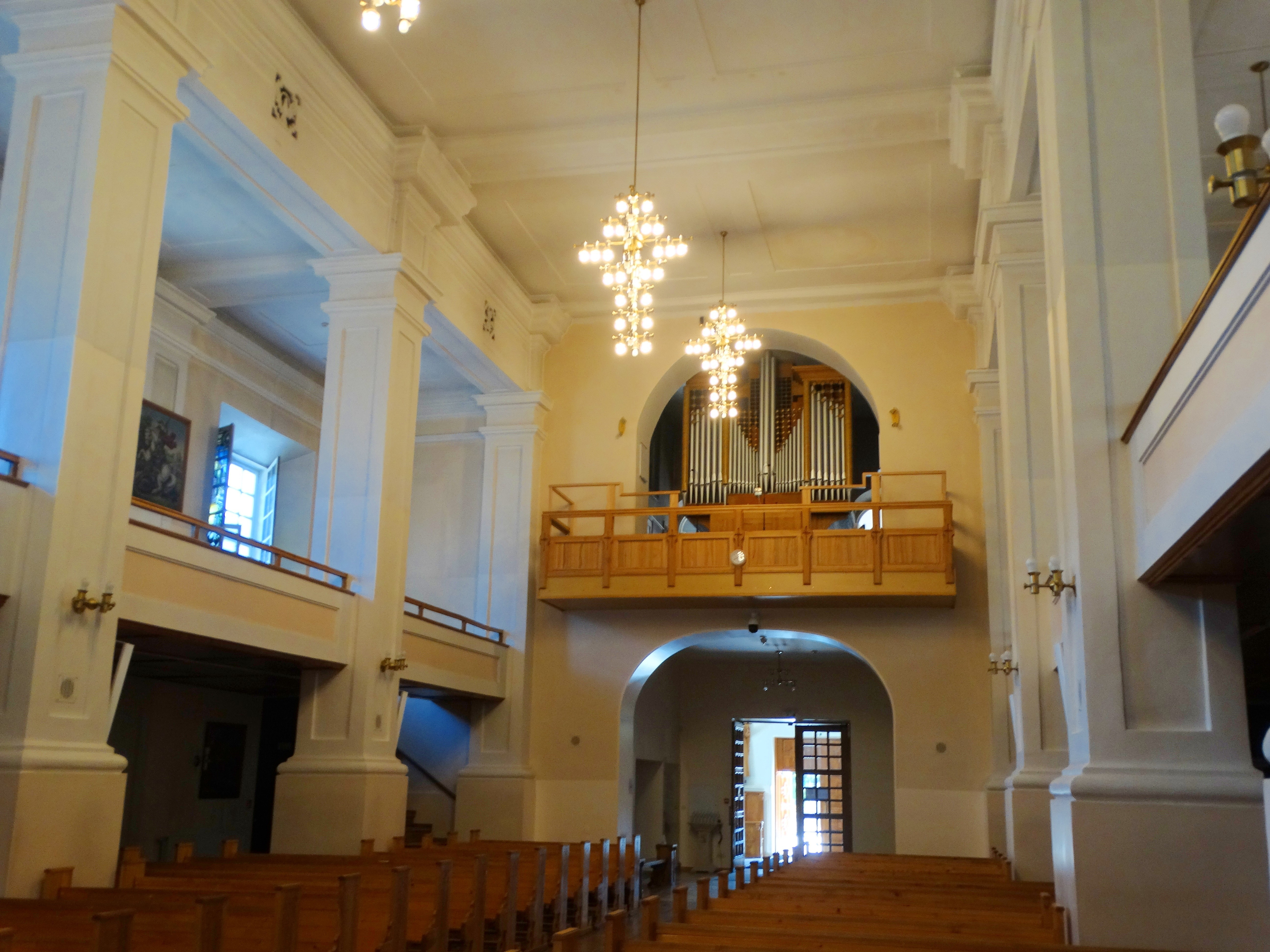
Organ
