= Holy Trinity Church, Oradea =

Heritage site in Bihor County, Romania

Coordinates: 47°03′25″N 21°56′11″E

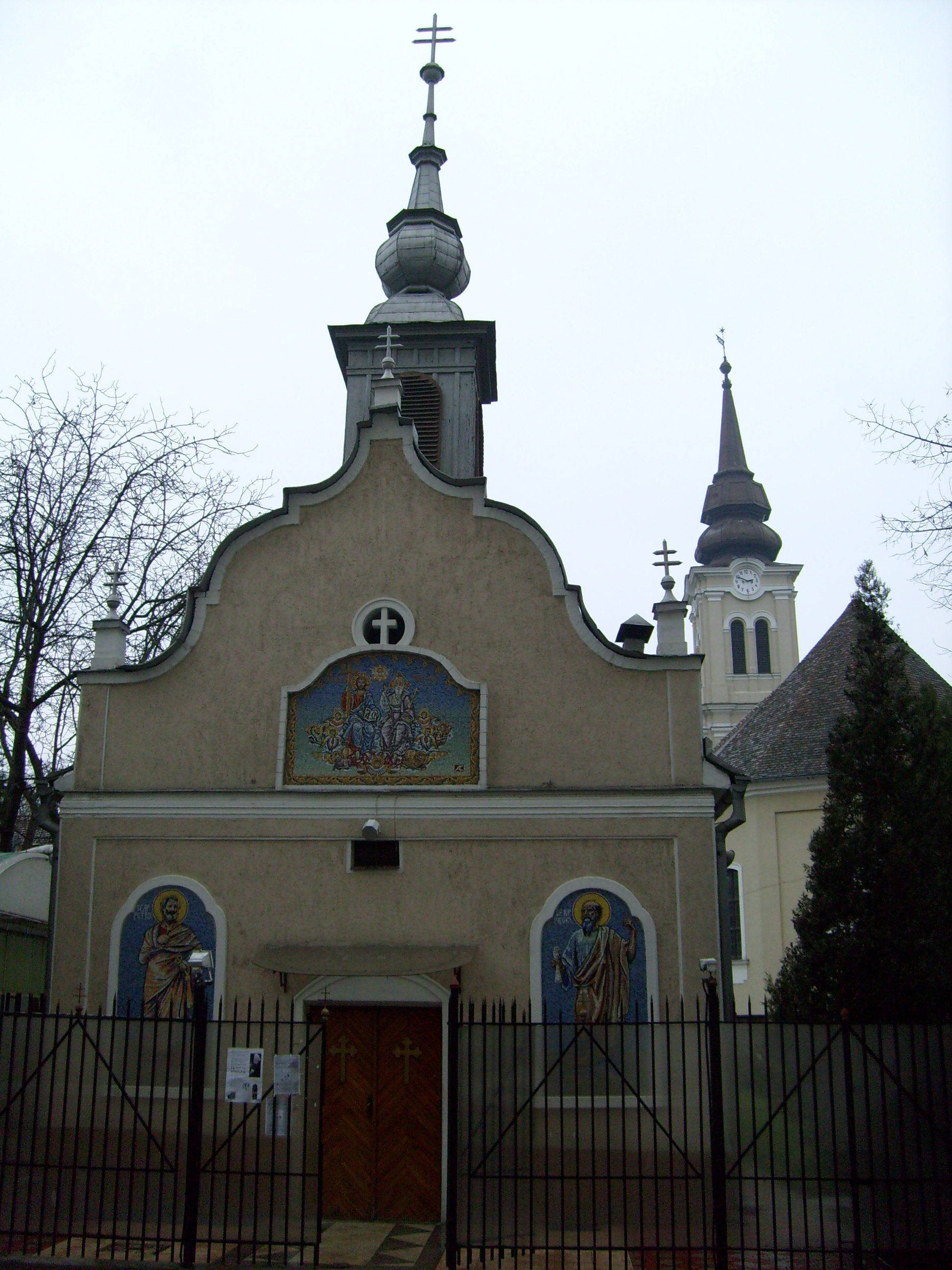
Holy Trinity Church

Holy Trinity Church (Romanian: Biserica Sfânta Treime) is a Romanian Orthodox church located at 13 Parcul Traian Street, Oradea, Romania. It is dedicated to the Holy Trinity.

The church was begun in 1692, after the loss of Ottoman control over the city during the Great Turkish War, in favor of the Habsburg monarchy. Originally a Roman Catholic church, it was initiated by Bishop Ágoston Benkovich and dedicated to Saint Bridget of Sweden. It was the first Catholic church outside the Oradea Citadel, located in the Olosig district. It burned in 1703 and was rebuilt in 1722.

Ship-shaped, it has a pentagonal altar; the exterior features a small wooden tower. Initially Baroque in style, as seen in the pediment decorations, it is now Eclectic. The interior frescoes date to 1982–1985. After its Roman Catholic period, the church passed to the Ruthenian Greek Catholic community, who dedicated it to the Holy Spirit. Administered by the Oradea Mare Eparchy from 1786, it was controlled by the Hajdúdorog Eparchy between 1912 and 1919. The church was Greek-Catholic until 1948, when the new communist regime outlawed the denomination.

The church is listed as a historic monument by Romania's Ministry of Culture and Religious Affairs.
