= Holy Trinity Church, East Peckham =

Parish church in East Peckham, Kent, England

Coordinates: 51.21725°N 0.38173°E

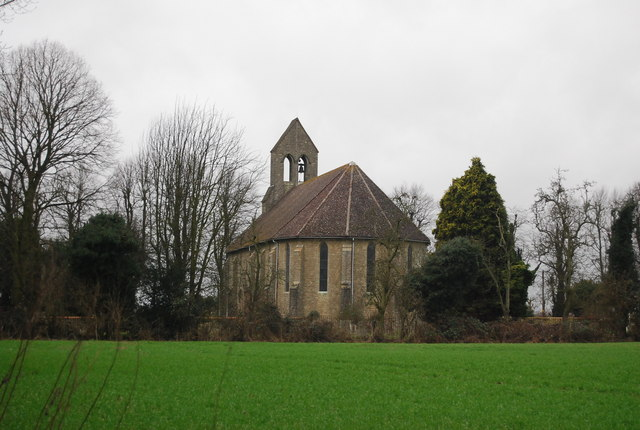

- Location within Kent
- OS grid reference: TQ 66430 49144
- Location: East Peckham, Kent
- Country: England
- Denomination: Anglican
- Website: holytrinityeastpeckham.co.uk

History
- Status: Parish church

Architecture
- Functional status: Active
- Heritage designation: Grade II
- Designated: 19 April 1985
- Completed: 1842

Administration
- Province: Canterbury
- Diocese: Rochester
- Archdeaconry: Tonbridge
- Deanery: Paddock Wood
- Parish: East Peckham

Holy Trinity Church is a parish church in East Peckham, Kent. It is a Grade II listed building.

== Building ==
Built of coursed rubble stone with a tiled roof.

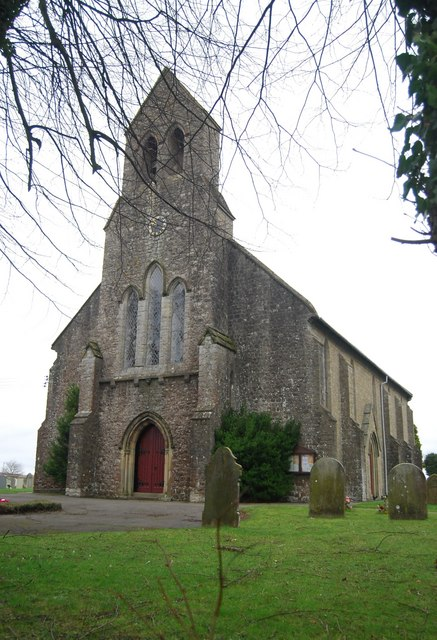
The church viewed from the front

== History ==
The "New Church" of the Most Holy Trinity was built in 1842 to replace the medieval parish church of St. Michael & All Angels which was now situated in the countryside over two miles from where the present 19th century village was later built.

== See also ==
- East Peckham
