= Holy Trinity Church (Trinidad, California) =

Historic church in California, United States

- U.S. National Register of Historic Places
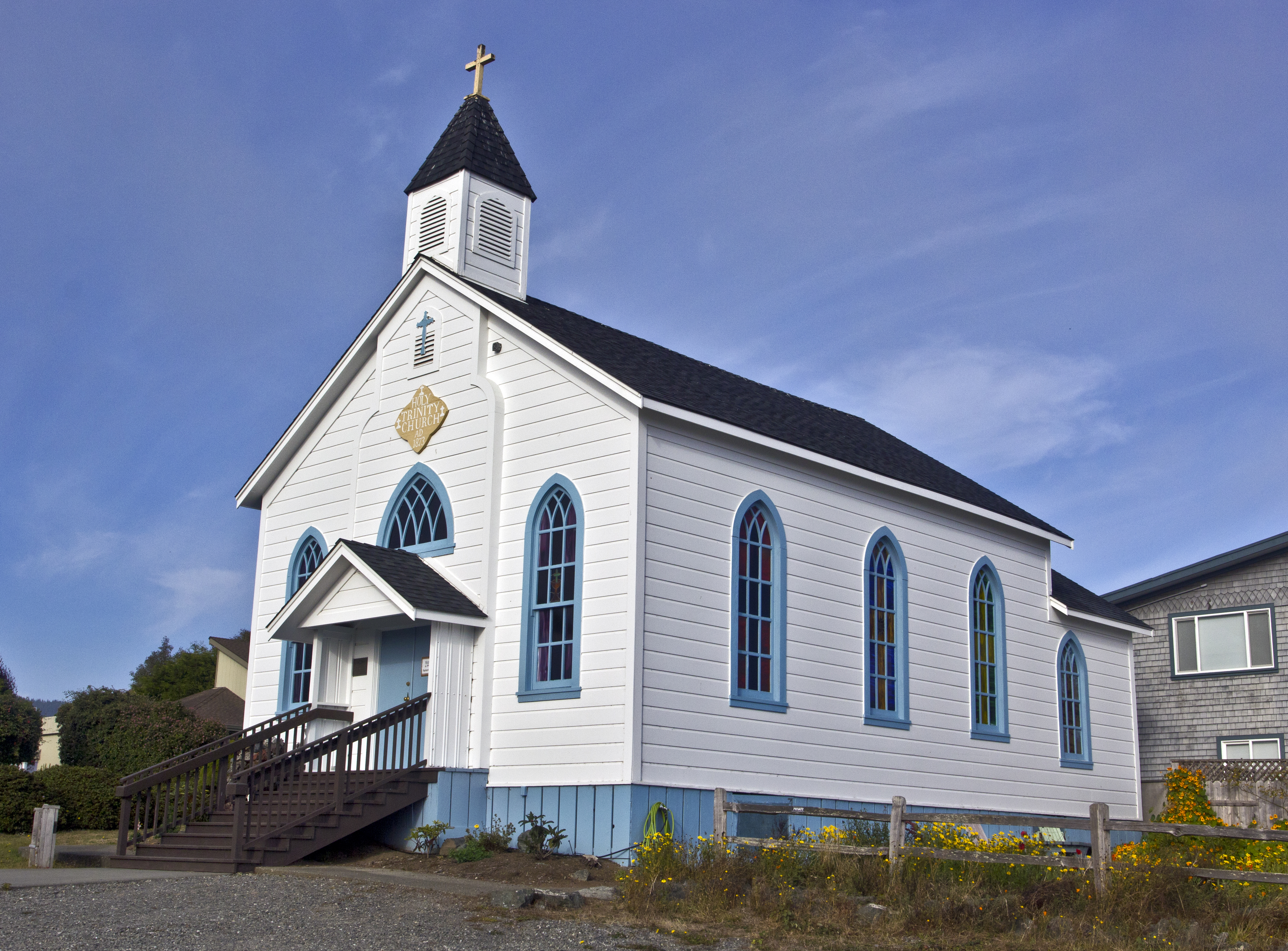

- Location within California Location within the United States
- Location: Parker and Hector St., Trinidad, California
- Coordinates: 41.05913°N 124.14399°W
- Area: less than one acre
- Built: 1873
- Architect: Purcell & Griffith
- Architectural style: Gothic Revival
- NRHP reference No.: 80004608
- Added to NRHP: August 6, 1980

The Holy Trinity Church at Parker and Hector St. in Trinidad, California was built in 1873. It was listed on the National Register of Historic Places in 1980.

The wood-frame building has a gable roof and a small steeple. The steeple replaced a slightly larger sometime between 1907 and 1954. Sixty people can sit in the long wooden pews with another 18 sitting in the choir loft.
