= Holy Trinity (disambiguation) =

The Holy Trinity is the Christian concept of God as three entities: the Father, the Son and the Holy Spirit.

Holy Trinity may also refer to:

== Paintings ==
- Holy Trinity (Botticelli), a 1490s altarpiece by Sandro Botticelli
- Holy Trinity (Lotto), a c. 1519-1520 painting by Lorenzo Lotto
- Holy Trinity (Masaccio), a 1428 fresco in a church in Florence, Italy
- Holy Trinity (Raphael and Perugino), a 16th-century fresco in San Severo church in Perugia, Italy

== Other uses ==
- Holy Trinity (colleges) or the Big Three, Harvard, Princeton, and Yale
- Holy trinity (cooking), a mix of vegetables in Cajun cookery
- Holy Trinity (film), a 2019 American comedy film directed by and starring Molly Hewitt
- "The Holy Trinity" (The Grand Tour), an episode of The Grand Tour, or the trio of hypercars featured in the episode
- "The Holy Trinity", a nickname used by fans to refer to Canadian rock trio Rush

== See also ==
- ARA Santísima Trinidad (D-2) "Most Holy Trinity", a 1974 Argentinian warship
- Feast of the Holy Trinity or Trinity Sunday, which celebrates the Christian doctrine of the Trinity
- Holy Trinity Academy (disambiguation)
- Holy Trinity Anglican Church (disambiguation)
- Holy Trinity Cathedral (disambiguation)
- Holy Trinity Catholic High School (disambiguation)
- Holy Trinity Church (disambiguation)
- Holy Trinity College (disambiguation)
- Holy Trinity Episcopal Church (disambiguation)
- Holy Trinity Greek Orthodox Church (disambiguation)
- Holy Trinity High School (disambiguation)
- Holy Trinity School (disambiguation)
- House of the Holy Trinity or Soutra Aisle, a ruined church in southern Scotland
- Trimurti, the Hindu Trinity
- Trinity (disambiguation)
- Unholy Trinity (disambiguation)
