= HTA =

HTA may refer to:

== Education ==
- Hawaii Technology Academy
- High Tech Academy, in Cleveland, Ohio, United States
- Holy Trinity Academy (disambiguation)
- Home Team Academy, a government training institute in Singapore

== Other uses ==
- Chita-Kadala International Airport, in Russia
- Hapoel Tel Aviv F.C., an Israeli football club
- Hard Truck Apocalypse, a video game
- Harris Tweed Authority, a Scottish statutory public body
- Health technology assessment, a multidisciplinary policy analysis methodology
- Health Technology Assessment, a journal
- Heavier than air
- Helitrans, a Norwegian airline
- Hierarchical task analysis, one method of task analysis
- Highway Traffic Act (Ontario)
- Hizb ut-Tahrir America, an American Islamic organization
- Home team advantage, a sports term
- Home Technology Association, an industry association
- Horticultural Trades Association
- Hot Thespian Action, a Canadian sketch comedy troupe
- HTML Application, a user interface markup language originated by Microsoft
- Human Tissue Authority, of the British Department of Health
- Humboldt Transit Authority
