= Holy Trinity College =

Holy Trinity College may refer to:

- Holy Trinity College, Hong Kong
- Holy Trinity College, Cookstown in County Tyrone, Northern Ireland
- Holy Trinity College Bromley, a former school in London
- Holy Trinity College of General Santos City in General Santos, Philippines
- Holy Trinity College, Catholic University of Zimbabwe in Harare, Zimbabwe
- Holy Trinity College, former name of Holy Trinity University, in Puerto Princesa City
- Theological College of the Holy Trinity, in Addis Ababa, Ethiopia
- Holy Trinity College, precursor to the University of Dallas

== See also ==
- Holy Trinity (disambiguation)
- Holy Trinity Academy (disambiguation)
- Holy Trinity School (disambiguation)
