= Angela Maria Autsch =

German religious sister

Venerable Angela Maria Autsch CSST
- Born: Maria Cäcilia Autsch; 26 March 1900; Röllecken, Attendorn, German Empire
- Died: 23 December 1944 (aged 44); Auschwitz-Birkenau, German-occupied Poland

Angela Maria Autsch, baptized as Maria Cäcilia Autsch, religious name Angela Maria of the Sacred Heart of Jesus (26 March 1900 – 23 December 1944), was a German religious sister of the Congregation Sisters of the Most Holy Trinity. Her beatification process was opened in 1992.

== Early life ==
Maria Cäcilia Autsch was born in Röllecken, part of Attendorn in the Olpe district of (Westphalia), German Empire on 26 March 1900. She was a member of a modest working-class family (her father was a quarry worker) that regularly practised the Catholic faith. She went to school in the village of Bamenohl. The terrible economic situation in the Weimar Republic meant that she had to go out to work in the clothing store Bischoff & Broegger in Finnentrop, where she was popular amongst both fellow workers and customers

Maria was thirty-three years old when she joined the Trinitarian Sisters of Valence in Mötz, Austria. Upon her investiture on 4 July 1934 she was given the religious name Angela Maria of the Sacred Heart of Jesus. She made her first vows on 16 August 1934 and her solemn vows on 28 September 1938, the year Hitler annexed Austria.

== Imprisonment and martyrdom ==
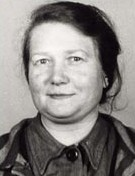
Sr. Angela Maria Autsch, photograph of 26 March 1942, on the day of arrival in Auschwitz

Since the Gauleiter at that time wanted to report a "monastery-free Tyrol" to Hitler on his birthday in April 1939, the convent in Mötz was to be confiscated. When the Nazi party tried to expropriate the convent, Sr. Autsch, who represented the mother superior, succeeded in saving it by claiming the Tyrolean monastery was Spanish property.

Official records lack any substantive justification for Sr. Angela's imprisonment, so the prevailing theory is, that her attitude led to her arrest. In March 1940, she disapproved of her nephew's volunteering for the air force. She wrote in a letter: "It will be horrible ... It will be stormy for all nations! We ... are only there for Him." In March 1940, she wrote that it was necessary to "pray for the hard-pressed monasteries".

On 10 August 1940, Sr. Angela, who took care of a sick woman, went to buy some milk. She met some women she knew and she related that the Allies had sunk a German ship off Norway and many had died in that disaster. She ended saying: "Der Hitler ist eine Geißel für ganz Europa!" (or "eine Plage") ("Hitler is a scourge [or "a plague"] for all of Europe").

The Gestapo opened a file on Sr. Angela and arrested her on 12 August 1940. She was jailed for seventeen days in Innsbruck before, without a trial, becoming prisoner no. 4651 in the concentration camp of Ravensbrück on 31 August 1940; as a political inmate she had to wear a red triangle.

In Ravensbrück, she was a light of hope and courage to her fellow inmates. She was frequently beaten by her captors but her contagious good humor was "a ray of sunshine in deepest Hell". Some prisoners who might have killed themselves were inspired by her, they said afterwards, even those who had no idea that she was a religious sister. After a few weeks, she was sent to the infirmary, where she cared for postpartum women, worked in the laundry, and served as a cook. She used this opportunity to secretly distribute medication and soap to fellow prisoners.

In March 1942, the Nazis sent Sr. Angela to Auschwitz concentration camp, along with a transport of a thousand female prisoners who were to be used to build a women's concentration camp. In Auschwitz, Sr. Angela befriended a Jewish doctor from Slovakia, Margarita Schwalbova. Feeling depressed and less than human, Schwalbova was deeply moved when the sister went up to her and gently stroked her hair. Although Schwalbova was an atheist, she and Sr. Angela became friends, with the latter acting in a way that earned her the byname "Angel of Auschwitz". When Schwalbova was sick, she told her stories about the lives and miracles of the saints, and shared her meager rations with her and others even though this was strictly forbidden. Sr. Angela told Schwalbowa, that she was arrested for "insulting the Führer and inciting the population".

In March 1943, Sr. Angela was transferred to Birkenau, the extermination camp, where she worked in the kitchen and infirmary. In October, she contracted typhus, from which she never fully recovered. On 15 May 1943 she was sent to the camp's SS hospital, where she cared for her torturers. She was even offered to be released from the concentration camp as a free nurse if she left her religious congregation, but refused. Sr. Angela died in an Allied air raid on 23 December 1944, just a month before the Soviet Red army liberated the camp. Her body was burned in the concentration camp crematorium.

Her mother superior, Michaela Roth CSST, who recorded the basic information of every sister of the congregation, wrote: "Died on 23 December 1944, as a martyr in Auschwitz concentration camp in Silesia, where she had to spend four and a half years.

== Beatification process ==
The testimony of the surviving prisoners, particularly of Margarita Schwalbova, and nearly one hundred letters of Sr. Angela, speaking of her deep faith during her imprisonment, prompted the Archdiocese of Vienna to initiate the beatification process on 8 March 1990. The diocesan process was completed in 1996. On 19 May 2018, Pope Francis declared Sr. Angela venerable and confirmed her heroic virtue. In 2024, Francis remembered Sr. Angela in video message on the occasion of the opening of the International Eucharistic Congress in Quito: "when the evil looming over the world was already evident, she inspired her relatives to resist through simple yet profound gestures like frequent Communion, in the conviction that the Eucharist strengthened the Church and its members against evil."
