= Holy Trinity School =

Holy Trinity School or Holy Trinity Catholic School may refer to:

== Canada ==
- Holy Trinity School (Richmond Hill), Ontario

== India ==
- Holy Trinity School, Allahabad, Uttar Pradesh; affiliated with Boys' High School & College
- Holy Trinity School, Kanjikode, Kerala

== United Kingdom ==
- Holy Trinity School, Crawley, West Sussex, England
- Holy Trinity School, Kidderminster, Worcestershire, England
- Holy Trinity School, Guildford, Surrey, England

== United States ==
- Holy Trinity Catholic School, Birmingham, Alabama
- Holy Trinity Catholic Schools, headquartered in Fort Madison, Iowa
- Holy Trinity School (Washington, D.C.)

== See also ==
- Holy Trinity Catholic and Church of England School, Barnsley, South Yorkshire, England
- Holy Trinity (disambiguation)
- Holy Trinity Academy (disambiguation)
- Holy Trinity Catholic High School (disambiguation)
- Holy Trinity College (disambiguation)
- Holy Trinity High School (disambiguation)
