= Holy Trinity Episcopal Church =

Holy Trinity Episcopal Church may refer to:

== United States ==
(by state)

- Holy Trinity Episcopal Church (Fruitland Park, Florida)
- Holy Trinity Episcopal Church (Melbourne, Florida)
- Holy Trinity Episcopal Church (West Palm Beach, Florida)
- Holy Trinity Episcopal Church (Georgetown, Kentucky)
- Holy Trinity Episcopal Church (Luverne, Minnesota)
- Holy Trinity Episcopal Church (Bowie, Maryland)
- Holy Trinity Episcopal Church (Southbridge, Massachusetts)
- Holy Trinity Episcopal Church (Manhattan)
- Holy Trinity Episcopal Church (Fallon, Nevada), listed on the National Register of Historic Places (NRHP) in Nevada
- Holy Trinity Episcopal Church (Spring Lake, New Jersey), NRHP-listed
- Holy Trinity Episcopal Church (Greensboro, North Carolina)
- Holy Trinity Episcopal Church (Glendale Springs, North Carolina), part of Holy Communion Episcopal Parish (Ashe County, North Carolina)
- Holy Trinity Episcopal Church (Swanton, Vermont)
- Holy Trinity Episcopal Church (Palouse, Washington), NRHP-listed

== See also ==
- Holy Trinity Church (disambiguation)
- Holy Trinity Anglican Church (disambiguation)
