= Attendorn =

- Town
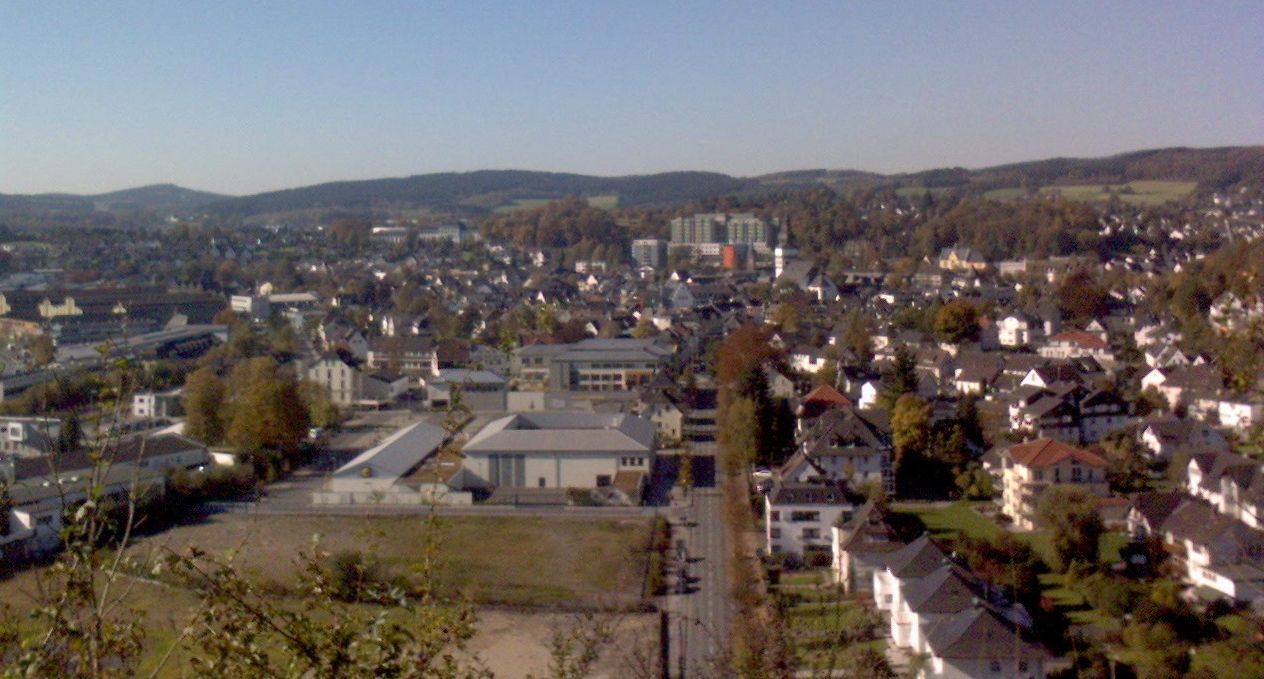

- Coat of arms

- Location of Attendorn within Olpe district
- Interactive map of Attendorn
- Location within Germany Location within North Rhine-Westphalia
- Coordinates: 51°07′44″N 07°54′08″E
- Country: Germany
- State: North Rhine-Westphalia
- Admin. region: Arnsberg
- District: Olpe

Government
  - Mayor (2025–2030): Christian Pospischil (SPD)

Area
  - Total: 97.95 km^{2} (37.82 sq mi)
- Elevation: 257 m (843 ft)

Population (2025-12-31)
  - Total: 23,376
  - Density: 238.7/km^{2} (618.1/sq mi)
- Time zone: UTC+01:00 (CET)
  - Summer (DST): UTC+02:00 (CEST)
- Postal codes: 57439
- Dialling codes: 02722
- Vehicle registration: OE
- Website: www.attendorn.de

The Hanseatic town of Attendorn (German pronunciation: [ˈatn̩dɔʁn]) is a medium-sized district town in North Rhine-Westphalia in the Olpe district in the southern Sauerland region with 25,089 inhabitants. It is known nationwide for the Atta Cave and Lake Bigge. Since March 19, 2012, Attendorn has been officially allowed to use the title “Hanseatic town.”

== History ==
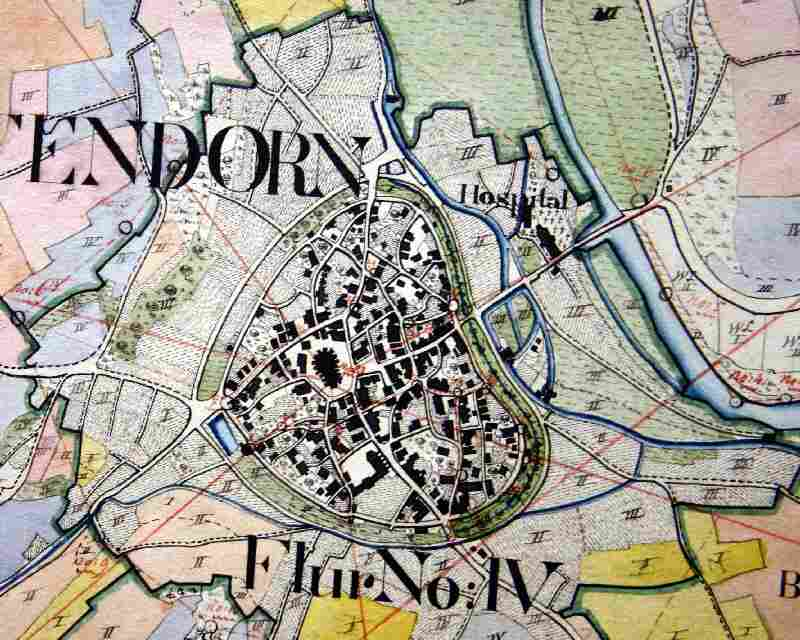
Town of Attendorn 1832 with town wall and moat

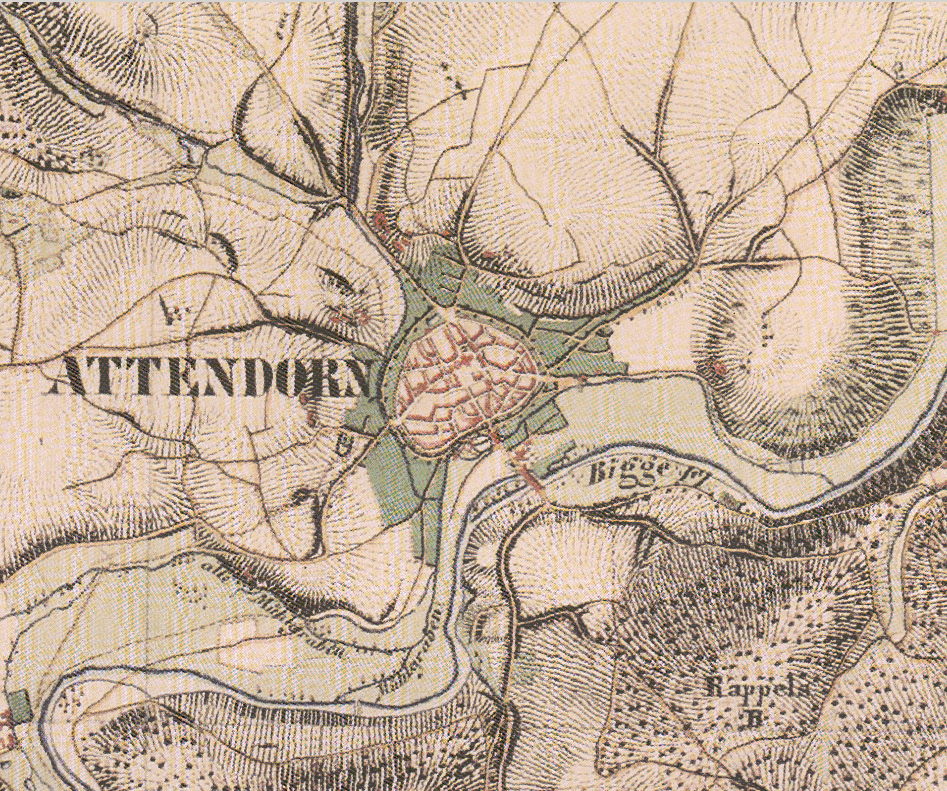
Overview map of Attendorn 1840, from the “Original Prussian Survey” (Preußische Uraufnahme)

The town's location was favoured by the good climate in the Attendorn-Elsper Limestone Double Basin (Attendorn-Elsper-Kalkdoppelmulde), the fruitful soil and favourable transport potential, and was already attracting people in prehistoric times. Heavier settlement, however, can be traced only as far back as the Middle Ages.

The town lies at the crossroads of two former long-distance roads, the Heidenstraße (“Heath Road”) and the so-called Königsstraße (“King’s Road”). Here, in Charlemagne’s time, arose a parish. Under the St.-Johannes-Kirche (church) are found the foundations of an old missionary church. In 1072, Archbishop Anno of Cologne endowed the Grafschaft Abbey and granted it, among other things, rights to an estate in Attendorn. Indeed, the monastery's endowment document stands as the town's earliest documentary mention.

In 1222, town rights, on the Soest model, were granted the town under Engelbert II of Berg. Schnellenberg Castle, built about 1200, and the acquisition of the Waldenburg (another castle) in 1248 served to safeguard Cologne's interests in the region.

Attendorn's heyday was brought about not only by its nine guilds but also, and mainly, by its wool and linen weavers. Furthermore, the town's political and ecclesiastical status as a bulwark against the County of Mark and as seat of a deanery in the old Archbishopric of Cologne brought it wealth and prosperity. As the Sauerland's only town, Attendorn joined the Rhenish League of Towns in 1255. Attendorn was only an indirect member of the Hanse, and was thus represented at the Hanseatic League’s great assemblies by the town of Soest.

By about 1200, Attendorn was already home to one of the archbishopric's mints. Mediaeval coins from Attendorn have been found as far afield as Brussels, Łubnice (Poland) and the island of Gotland.

From the early 14th century until today there has existed a hospital with a church and graveyard outside the town's walls. In 1420, Heinrich Weke endowed the Ewig Monastery. In 1429, he also added a hospital for the poor. For a time, the town was so well off that it could even grant the Archbishop of Cologne himself credit. Moreover, the town also supported him during his dispute with the town of Soest. In 1444 and 1445, the town helped the Archbishop conquer the castle and the land of Bilstein in the so-called Soest Feud.

Four times, in 1464, 1597, 1598 and 1613, the Plague beset the town. Great fires, too, ravaged the town in 1613, 1623, 1656, 1710, 1732, 1742 and 1783. The one in 1656 destroyed half the town. Attendorn also suffered as a result of war, sackings and occupations. Examples include the War of the Limburg-Hohenlimburg Succession in 1280, the Soest Feud from 1444 to 1449, the Truchsess War in 1583 and 1584 and the Thirty Years' War from 1618 to 1648. Attendorn reached its deepest economic despair in Napoleonic times, only recovering from the downturn in the mid-19th century.

The rise of Nazis and the Second World War affected Attendorn much like the rest of Germany. An Attendorn teacher and historian, supported by the government, documented the persecution of Attendorn Jewish families under Nazi rule. As in many places, this included destruction of property, boycotting Jewish stores, appropriating factories, and shipping Jews to concentration camps. A Nazi civilian forced-labor camp was established in Attendorn to provide labor to area factories. It housed up to 1,000 conscripted Polish, Soviet, and Czech laborers, until being liberated by U.S. military forces in April, 1945. Attendorn lost many citizens during the war and suffered heavy destruction under bombing on 28 March 1945, and also on 15 June that same year as a result of a munitions explosion.

== Geography ==
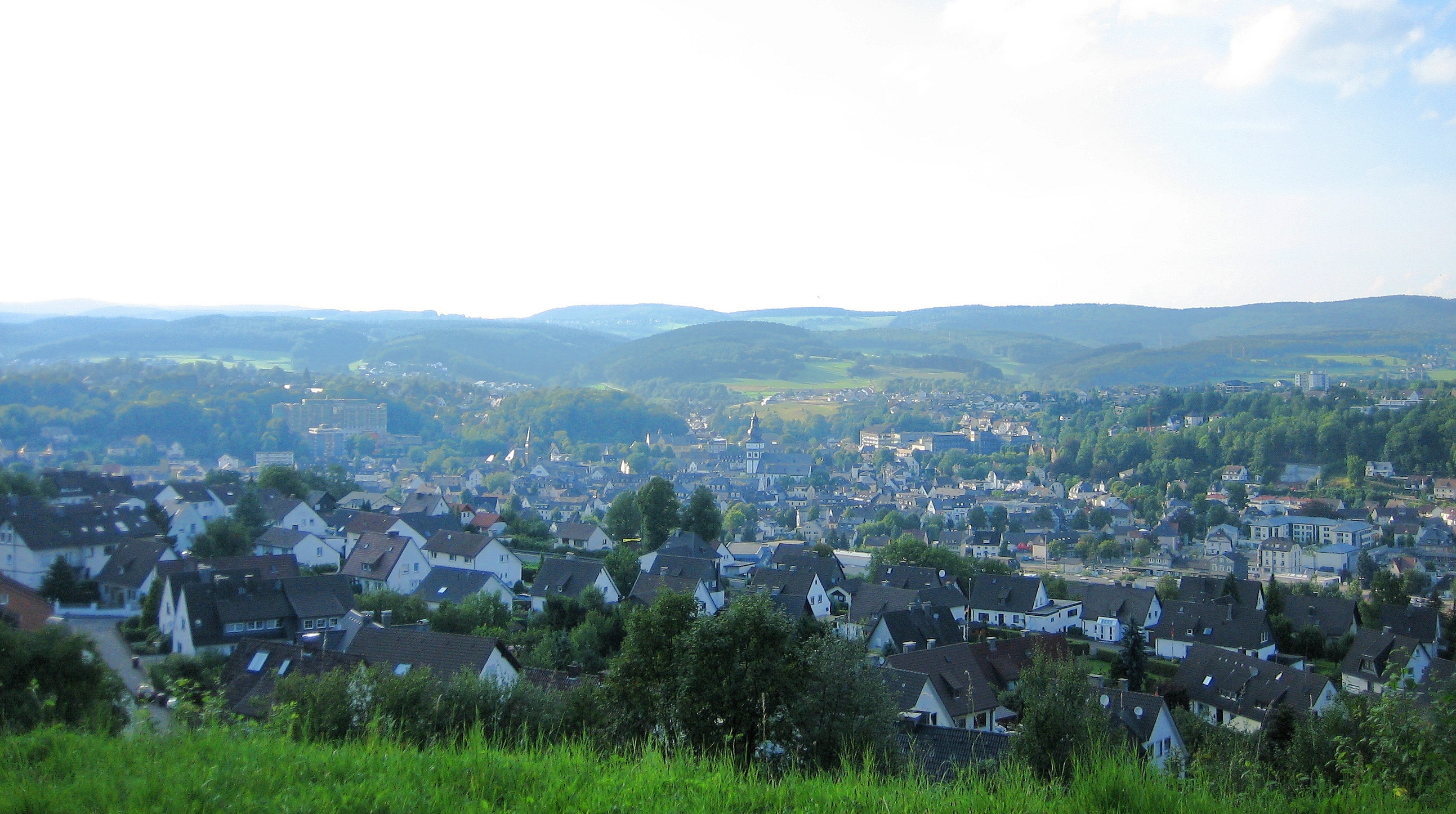
Inner town from the southeast

The town of Attendorn lies in the Naturpark Ebbegebirge, right on the Biggesee (lake) in the district's northwest. The town's highest point is the Rüenhardt (636 m), whereas the Ahauser Stausee (reservoir) has an elevation of only 248 m. The municipal area comprises 97 km², roughly half of which is wooded. It is a part of South Westphalia.

=== Constituent municipalities ===
Attendorn is subdivided into the following municipalities (with population figures): Albringhausen (91), Attendorn (13,684), Berlinghausen (20), Beukenbeul (291), Biekhofen (623), Biggen (55), Borghausen (26), Bremge bei Ennest (7), Bremge/Biggesee (37), Bürberg (49), St. Claas (182), Dahlhausen (6), Dünschede (650), Ebbe, Forsthaus (2), Ebbelinghagen (36), Eichen (30), Ennest (2,039), Erlen (36), Ewig (24), Fernholte (4), Hebberg (39), Helden (1,144), Hofkühl (14), Hohen Hagen (8), Holzweg (406), Jäckelchen (15), Keseberg (29), Keuperkusen (11), Kraghammer (66), Lichringhausen (516), Listerscheid (161), Mecklinghausen (196), Merklinghausen (17), Milstenau (80), Neuenhof (429), Neu-Listernohl (1,195), Niederhelden (324), Nuttmecke (23), Papiermühle (111), Petersburg (535), Rauterkusen (38), Rautersbeul (3), Repe (158), Rieflinghausen (75), Röllecken (478), Roscheid (21), Schnellenberg (8), Silbecke (93), Uelhof (17), Voßsiepen (3), Wamge (204), Weltringhausen (29), Weschede (60), Weuste (18), Windhausen (668) and Wörmge (24).

=== Population development ===
Historical population

Year	Pop.	±% p.a.
1939	12,100	—
1950	15,600	+2.34%
1961	19,130	+1.87%
1965	21,083	+2.46%
1970	21,735	+0.61%
1975	22,080	+0.32%
1980	21,515	−0.52%
1985	21,072	−0.42%

Year	Pop.	±% p.a.
1990	22,736	+1.53%
1995	23,888	+0.99%
2000	24,460	+0.47%
2005	24,814	+0.29%
2010	24,693	−0.10%
2015	24,676	−0.01%
2020	24,330	−0.28%
2025	23,376	−0.80%

Source: Landesdatabank Nordrhein-Westfalen (1965-2025)

== Politics ==
=== Mayor ===
In the 2014 local elections, SPD candidate Christian Pospischil was elected mayor. Pospischil was most recently re-elected in 2025 with 67.53 percent (2020: 77.5 percent) of the vote. CDU candidate Dr. Brodhun was defeated with 32.47 percent.

=== City council ===
After the 2025 elections, the Attendorn city council is composed as follows:

Party	Votes	%	+/-	Seats	+/-
Social Democratic Party (SPD)	4,781	41.6	▼0.3	16	±0
Christian Democratic Union (CDU)	4,085	35.6	▼1.7	14	▼1
Alternative for Germany (AfD)	1,173	10.2	New	4	New
Alliance 90/The Greens (Grüne)	682	5.9	▼3.0	2	▼1
Independent Voters' Association Attendorn (UWG)	369	3.2	▼2.8	1	▼1
Free Democratic Party (FDP)	324	2.8	▼3.1	1	▼1
The PARTY (PARTEI)	72	0.6	New	0	New
Valid votes	10,782	99.5			
Invalid votes	62	0.5			
Total	11,548	100.0		38	±0
Electorate/voter turnout	19,217	60.1			
Source: City of Attendorn

==== History of Attendorn‘s mayors ====
Owing to a fire that damaged the town in 1783, no information from before then is available.

===== Mayors (1783–1804) =====
- 1783-1804: Franz Anton Plange
- 1783: Johann Eberhard Hoberg
- 1783-1784: Johann Emmerich Gottfried Joanvahrs
- 1786-1794: Johann Pieper
- 1790-1796: Johann Arnold Gertmann
- 1791-1793: Dr. Theodor Greve
- 1800-1802: Ferdinand Dingerkus
- 1802-1804: Johann Greve
- 1804: [Stephan?] Dingerkus

===== Stadtschultheiße (1812–1826) =====
A Schultheiß in German history was an official somewhat akin to a sheriff in England.

- 1812-1818: Johann Anton Goebel
- 1818-1826: Adolf Salomon

===== Mayors from 1826 =====
- 1826-1829: Adolf Salomon
- 1829-1832: Kaspar Belke
- 1832-1835: Eberhard Belke
- 1835-1862: Arnold Becker
- 1862-1864: Franz Lex
- 1864-1865: Ferdinand Wurzer
- 1865-1866: Eberhard Wilmes (acting mayor during a vacancy)
- 1866-1908: Richard Heim
- 1908-1911: Heinrich Tück
- 1911-1919: Dr. Theodor Laymann
- 1920-1932: Wilhelm Hennemann
- 1932-1933: Hans Becker (commissary)
- 1933-1934: Peter Struif (NSDAP)
- 1934-1945: Josef Schütte (NSDAP)
- 1945: Dr. Wolfram Ebers (CDU)
- 1945-1946: Dr. Johannes Weber (CDU)
- 1946: Josef Mayworm (SPD)
- 1946-1948: Robert Schmidt (CDU)
- 1948-1949: Erich Berghoff (CDU)
- 1949-1950: August Bruse (SPD)
- 1951-1952: Robert Schmidt (CDU)
- 1952-1969: Alois Albus (CDU)
- 1969-1978: Karl Hammer (CDU)
- 1978-1994: Josef Rüenauver (CDU) – Honorary Mayor
- 1994-2009: Alfons Stumpf (SPD)
- 2009-2014: Wolfgang Hilleke (independent)
- since 2014: Christian Pospischil (SPD)

=== Coat of arms ===
The town's arms show the black cross of the Electorate of Cologne on a white/silver background with a waxing crescent moon in the upper left (or right – dexter – in heraldry). The oldest surviving town seal, from 1243, shows Saint Peter, patron of the Archbishopric of Cologne, with his key and a half moon next to his head, and in later seals enthroned on the Electorate's shield. In 1910, the coat of arms was officially approved in its current form, and after municipal reform, it was also approved for further use in 1970. The half moon was used as a symbol for John the Baptist, who was also to be found as the parish's holy protector in early secret seals.

== Culture and sightseeing ==
=== Customs ===
==== Easter customs ====
Attendorners practise many specific Easter customs, among them the Semmelsegnen – which might be translated "Blessing of the Buns" – on Easter Saturday, and the felling, erection and burning of the Easter Crosses on Easter Saturday and Sunday.

===== Semmelsegnen =====
The Attendorn Easter bread, called Ostersemmel – “Easter bun” – is a mixed bread with caraway baked in local bakeries in the week leading up to Easter. Especially striking about these buns are the notches at each end that look somewhat like a fish's fins. This is an old Christian symbol. On Easter Saturday at 14:00, Attendorners gather outside the parish church to have their buns blessed by the minister. This custom is witnessed in documents as far back as 1658, but is likely much older.

===== Easter fire =====
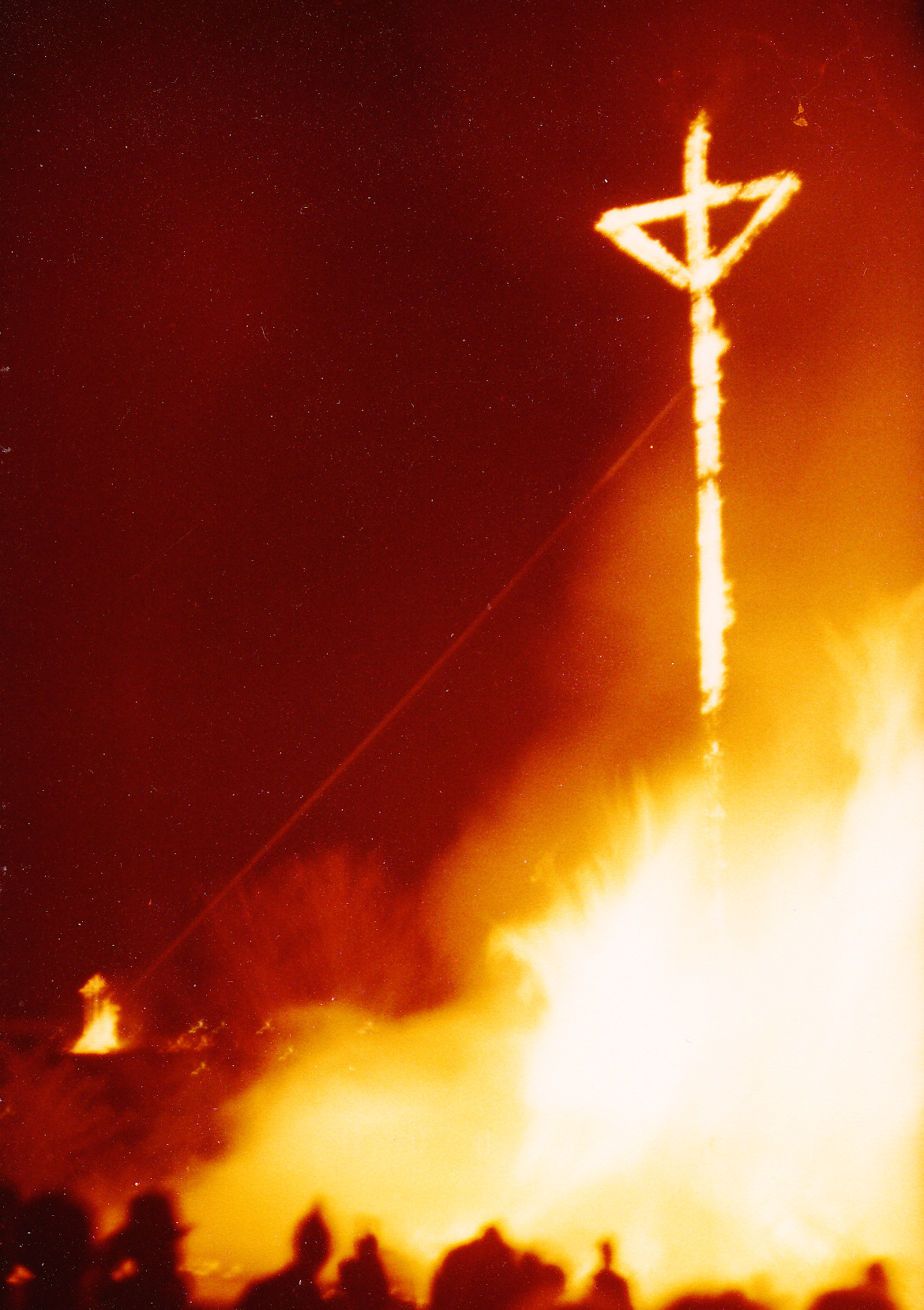
Easter fire

In the weeks leading up to Easter, the (male) members of the Easter fire club, the so-called Poskebrüder, gather in the woods that ring the town for the Holzstellen. This entails gathering brushwood to make faggots, called Bürden – “burdens” – which are later used to burn the crosses. The Easter fire club is divided into four Porten, based on the town's former “quarters” each of which was to be reached through its own town gate. Each Attendorner goes with his Porte, either the one in which he was born or the one in which his family lives. Not surprisingly, this leads to a rivalry, not always taken seriously, that can be seen not only at Easter but also throughout the year.

After the Semmelsegnen on Easter Saturday, members of the four Porten move into the town forest, and each fells a great spruce, whereafter these trees are borne into the town, to the marketplace, where they are measured. This is a contest, too, to try to get the longest spruce with the greatest diameter. Then, the trees go to the Osterköpfe – “Easter heads” – which are high spots at the edge of town or outside the town where the Easter crosses are put up the next day (Easter Sunday).

On Easter Sunday they gather on the Osterköpfe and prepare the spruces for the fire to come that evening. Each spruce is given a crossbar swathed in straw, and is lifted into place by muscle power alone. Once this has been done, the faggots are heaped in layers at the foot of the cross, and are likewise wrapped in straw.

Towards 20:40, the Poskebrüder begin their Fackelschwenken – “Torch Swinging” – in which torches cut from sprucewood are lit from the torch fire, itself in turn having been lit beforehand from the Easter candle. Participants stand around the Easter cross and, holding the torches upright, swing them back and forth, either beside or before the body. At 21:00, when the lighting for the cross on the parish church's steeple is switched on, the torches are thrown onto the faggots and the cross goes up in flames.

At 20:30, the four columns of the Easter procession, waiting at the town's former gates, begin to move towards the church, signalled by the four burning crosses. There, the Easter festivities are concluded with a celebratory prayer.

=== Music ===
There are many music clubs in Attendorn.

=== Buildings ===
==== St. John the Baptist parish church ====
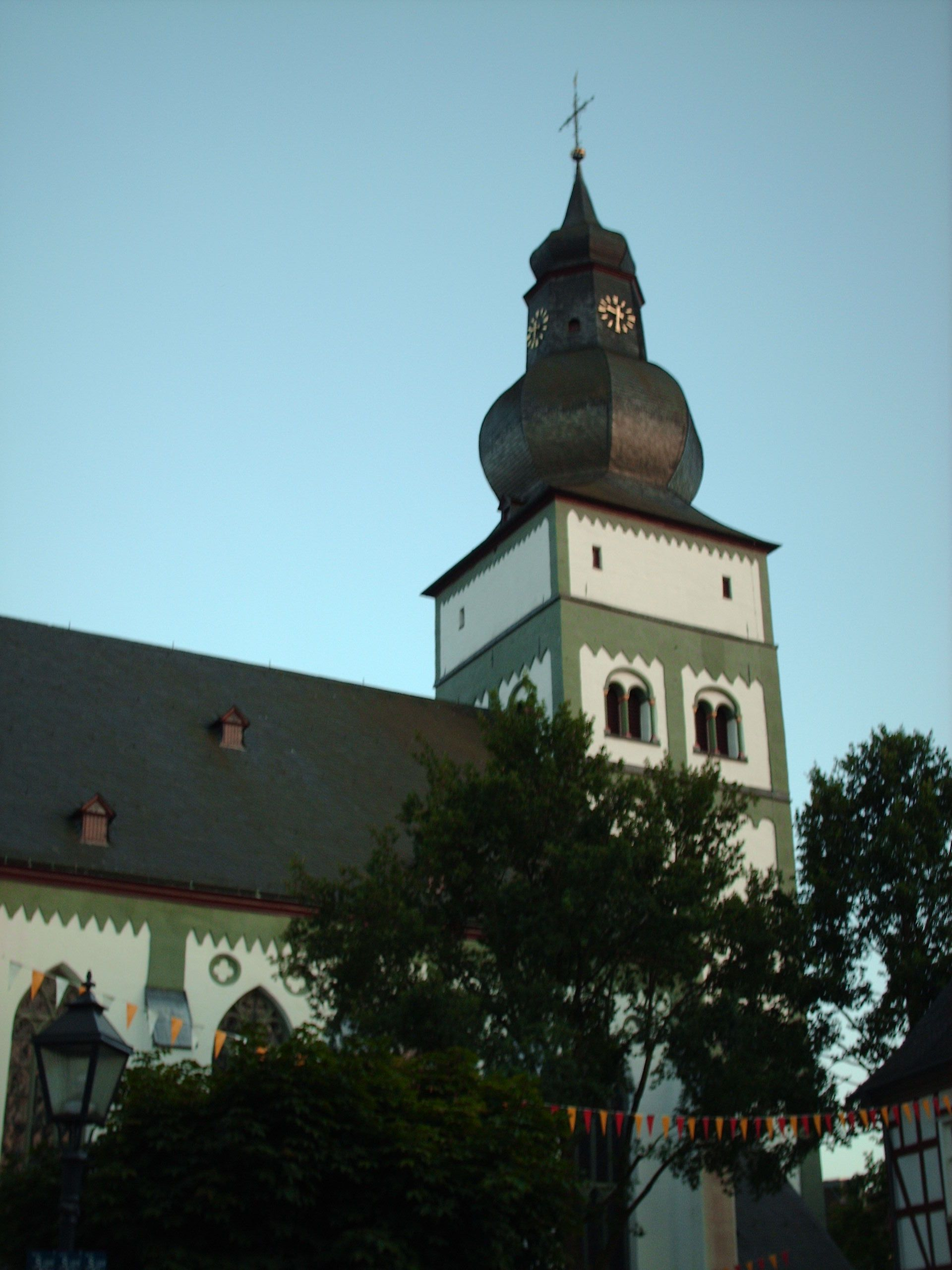
St. John the Baptist

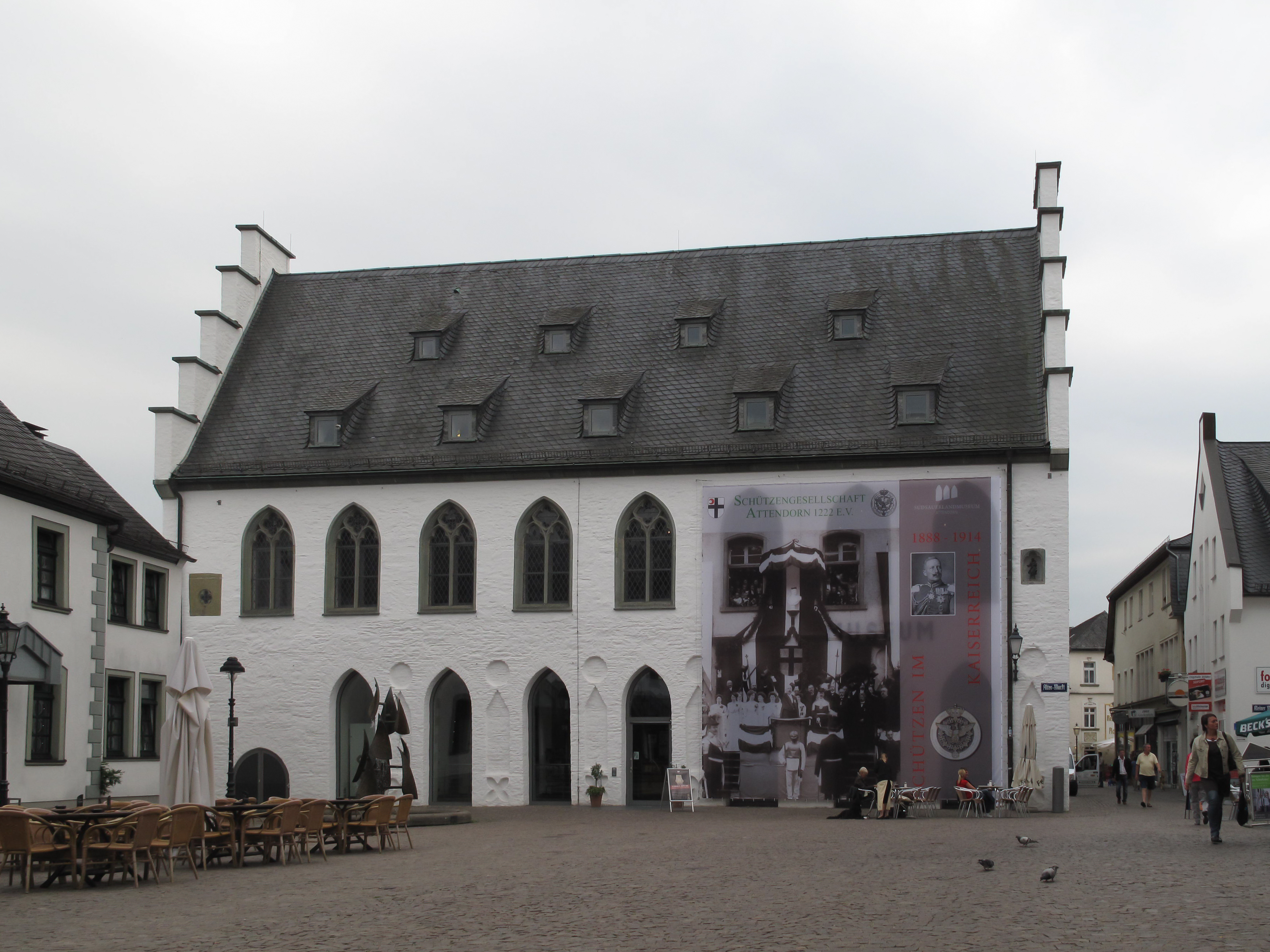
South Sauerlandmuseum

The Pfarrkirche St. Johannes Baptist is also called the Sauerländer Dom – Sauerland Cathedral. It has a Romanesque tower from about 1200 and a Gothic nave from the 14th century. Striking about the church is the tower's Baroque cupola, which has adorned the church since 1634.

==== Town Hall with South Sauerland Museum ====
The old town hall (Rathaus) likely dates back to the 14th century, and it was thoroughly remodelled in the 18th and 19th centuries. Between 1962 and 1964, on the basis of some findings and an illustration kept at the parish church, the town hall's exterior was remodelled so that it once again took on its original appearance. It is a massive building with reconstructed crow-stepped gables at the sides. The ground floor, which opens into an arcade, was once used as a shopping centre, but is now given over to the Südsauerlandmuseum. This has exhibits from the Olpe district, and also the Westphalian Tin Figure Cabinet (Westfälisches Zinnfigurenkabinett).

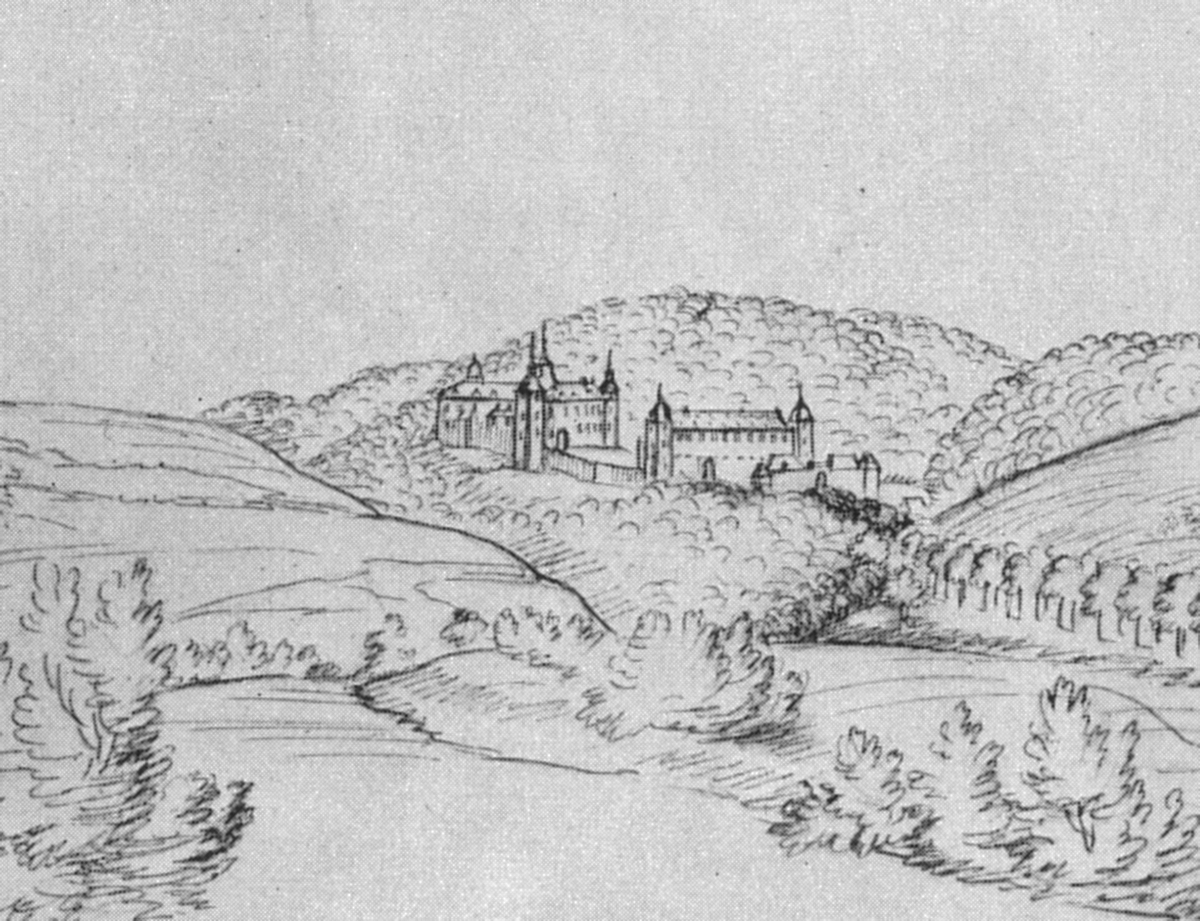
Drawing of Schnellenberg Castle (first half of the 18th century)

==== Schnellenberg Castle ====
On one of the town's hills is found the Burg Schnellenberg. Since 1594 it has been owned by the family of the Barons of Fürstenberg. In 1594, the later Landdroste of the Duchy of Westphalia, Kaspar von Fürstenberg, bought this castle complex, which had Imperial immediacy, in South Westphalia. It houses a hotel and a restaurant.

==== Town wall’s towers ====
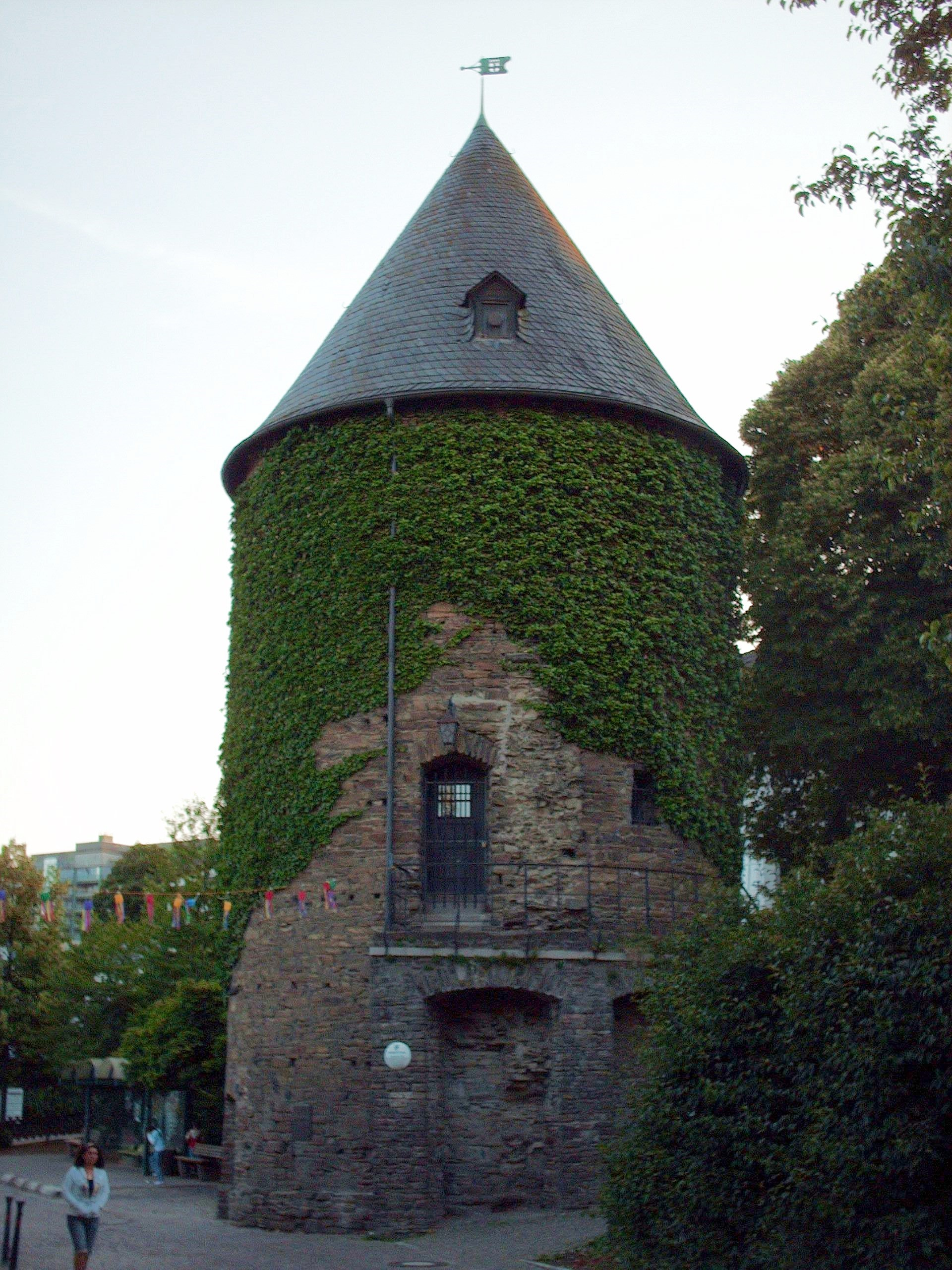
Bieketurm

Of the town fortifications demolished in 1812, two towers, the Pulverturm and the Bieketurm from the 13th century have been kept. The latter is nowadays used by the Schützengesellschaft Attendorn 1222 e. V. (a shooting club) as an armoury. Flags, king's chains, armour and other things may be viewed Saturdays from May to October between 10:00 and 12:00. On the tower's side, the former wall's height may be gauged from remnants there.

=== Natural monuments ===
==== Atta Cave ====
The best known sightseeing place in Attendorn is the Atta Cave (Atta-Höhle), a cave exposed during limestone mining in 1907 and one of Germany's biggest interconnected cave systems. Its genesis lies mainly in the limestone deposits in the Attendorn-Elsper Double Basin.

==== Bigge reservoir ====
In the south of the municipal area is the dam that holds the Biggetalsperre, or Bigge Reservoir. Together with the Listertalsperre and the Ahauser Stausee – two other reservoirs – it forms a large recreation area for the town and its environs.

== Economy and infrastructure ==
Attendorn's economy is based on midsize enterprises of the metal industry, which specialize for the most part in manufacturing armatures, pipes and other metal parts. Among them are Mubea, Viega, Aquatherm, GEDIA, and BeulCo.

=== Transport ===
Near Attendorn lies the Attendorn-Finnentrop airfield. Moreover, the town lies on the Biggesee-Expeess, RB92 (Finnentrop-Freudenberg railway) of Hessische Landesbahn, section DreiLänderBahn which has several stops and stations in the municipal area. Altendorn is located in the area of the fare association Westfalen-Tarif.

== Twin towns – sister cities ==
Attendorn is twinned with:

- Rawicz, Poland

== Notable people ==
=== Born in Attendorn ===
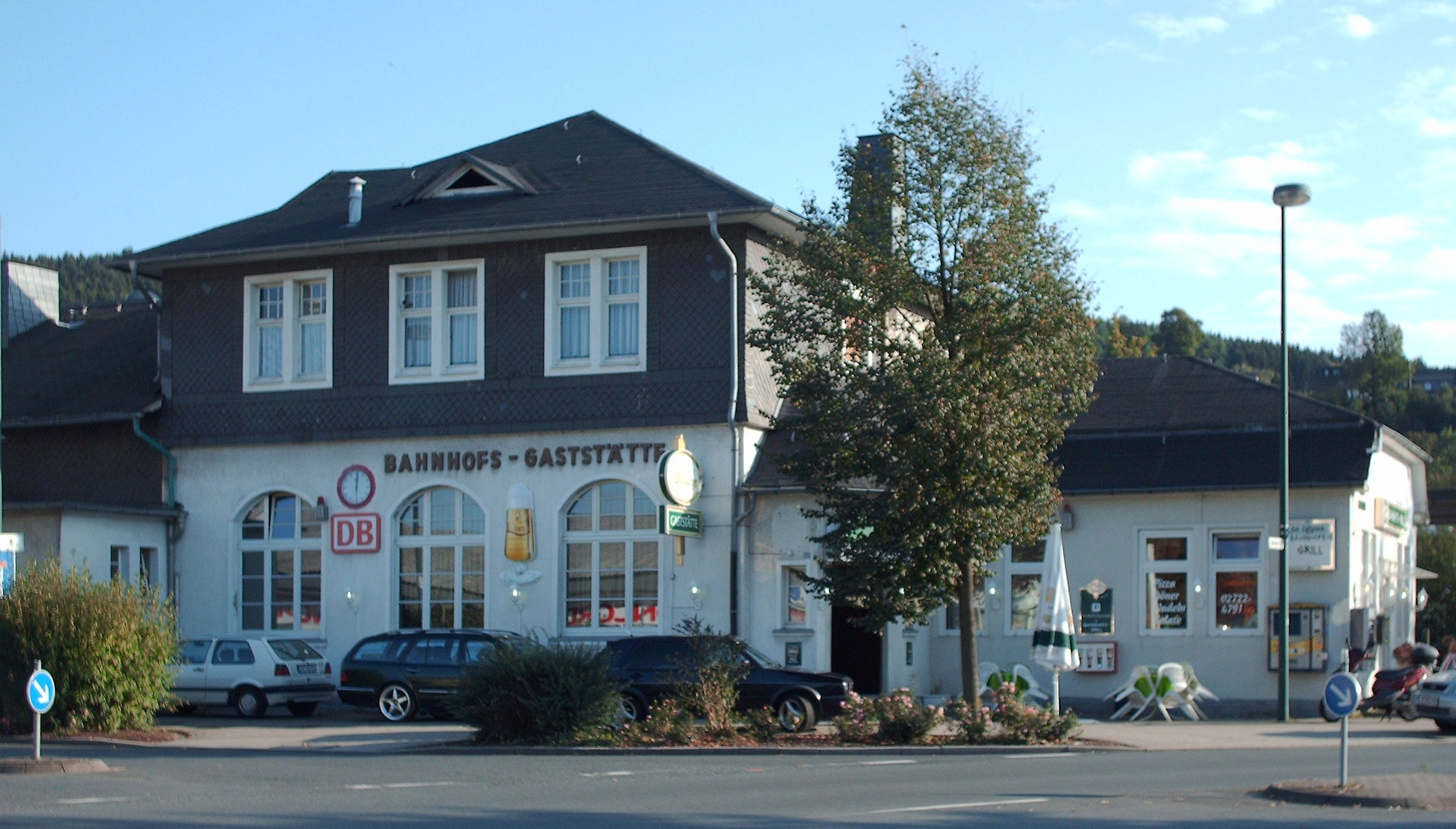
Train station in Attendorn

- ven. Angela Maria Autsch (1900–1944), Trinitarian Sister of Valence
- Herbert Sohler (1908–1991), World War II U-boat commander
- Otto Pöggeler (1928–2014), philosopher
- Wolfgang Demtröder (born 1931), physicist
- Tanja Hennes (born 1971), cyclist
- Daniel Beckmann (born 1980), organist
- Britta Hofmann (born 1980), journalist
- Florian Müller (born 1987), politician

=== Associated with Attendorn ===
- Willibrord Benzler (1853–1921), Bishop of the Diocese of Metz from 1901 to 1919, studied here
- Carl Schmitt (1888–1985), constitutional lawyer and political philosopher, lived as a boy in the Catholic convent in Attendorn and studied here
- Paul Josef Cordes (1934-2024), courier cardinal of the Roman Catholic Church, studied here
