= Holy Trinity Greek Orthodox Church =

Holy Trinity Greek Orthodox Church may refer to:

in Australia

- Holy Trinity Church, North Hobart
- Holy Trinity Greek Orthodox Church, Surry Hills

in Austria

- Holy Trinity Greek Orthodox Church, Vienna

in England

- Greek Orthodox Church of the Holy Trinity, Brighton

in the United States

(by state)

- Holy Trinity Greek Orthodox Church (San Francisco, California)
- Holy Trinity Greek Orthodox Church (Wilmington, Delaware)
- Holy Trinity Greek Orthodox Church (Sioux City, Iowa), listed on the NRHP in Woodbury County, Iowa
- Holy Trinity Greek Orthodox Church (Lowell, Massachusetts), NRHP-listed
- Archdiocesan Cathedral of the Holy Trinity, New York, New York
- Holy Trinity Ukrainian Greek Orthodox Church, Wilton, North Dakota
- First Methodist Episcopal-Holy Trinity Greek Orthodox Church, Steubenville, Ohio, listed on the NRHP in Jefferson County, Ohio
- Holy Trinity Greek Orthodox Church (Tulsa, Oklahoma)
- Holy Trinity Cathedral (Salt Lake City), Utah, listed on the NRHP as Holy Trinity Greek Orthodox Church

== See also ==
- Holy Trinity Church (disambiguation)
