= Troilo Baglioni =

Italian bishop

Troilo Baglioni († 1506) was an Italian bishop from the Baglioni family of Perugia.

He belonged to an influential noble lineage in the city and served as bishop of Perugia in the early 16th century. During his episcopate, he commissioned Raphael to paint the fresco of the Holy Trinity in the San Severo Chapel, a work later completed by Perugino.
