= Unholy Trinity =

Unholy Trinity may refer to:

- Impossible trinity or unholy trinity, a concept in international economics
- The unholy trinity in John Milton's Paradise Lost consisting of Satan, Sin and Death
- The unholy trinity of the dragon and the first and second beasts of the Book of Revelation
- The unholy trinity of the Song of Roland: Apollyon, Termagant, and Mahound.

== Popular culture ==
- The Unholy Trinity, a 2024 film starring Samuel L. Jackson
- Unholy Trinity, a 1995 album by Blitzkrieg
- Unholy Trinity, a 2025 album by Lord Belial
- "Unholy Trinity", a song by Aggressor from Of Long Duration Anguish
- "Unholy Trinity", a song by Epica from The Score – An Epic Journey
- "Unholy Trinity", a song by The Who from Endless Wire
- Unholy Trinity, a book by Mark Aarons and John Loftus
- Unholy Trinity, a book by Robert Bloch
- Unholy Trinity: Labor, Capital, and Land in the New Economy, a book by Duncan K. Foley
- Unholy Trinity: The IMF, World Bank, and WTO, a book by Richard Peet
- "Unholy Trinity", a term used to label atheist authors Richard Dawkins, Christopher Hitchens, and Sam Harris; see The God Delusion
- "Unholy Trinity", a term used to label atheist speakers Matt Dillahunty, Seth Andrews, and Aron Ra
- "Unholy Trinity", a nickname for three albums by Norwegian black metal band Darkthrone: A Blaze in the Northern Sky, Under a Funeral Moon and Transilvanian Hunger
- "Unholy Trinity", nickname of the trio of Quinn Fabray, Santana Lopez, and Brittany Pierce from the TV show Glee
- "Unholy Trinity of British Hard Rock and Heavy Metal", an honorific nickname for the three original heavy metal bands Black Sabbath, Deep Purple and Led Zeppelin
- "Unholy Trinity", a nickname for the three personas of professional wrestling legend The Undertaker; "The Deadman", "The American Badass" and Mark Calaway
- "Unholy Trinity", a concept and the main antagonists in the game "Faith: The Unholy Trinity" made by Airdorf Games and published by New Blood Interactive
- "Unholy Trinity", a term used to refer to three famous British folk horror films from the late 1960s to the early 1970s, Witchfinder General (1968), The Blood on Satan's Claw (1971), and The Wicker Man (1973).

== See also ==
- Trinity (disambiguation)
- Holy Trinity (disambiguation)
