= Britta Hofmann =

German journalist

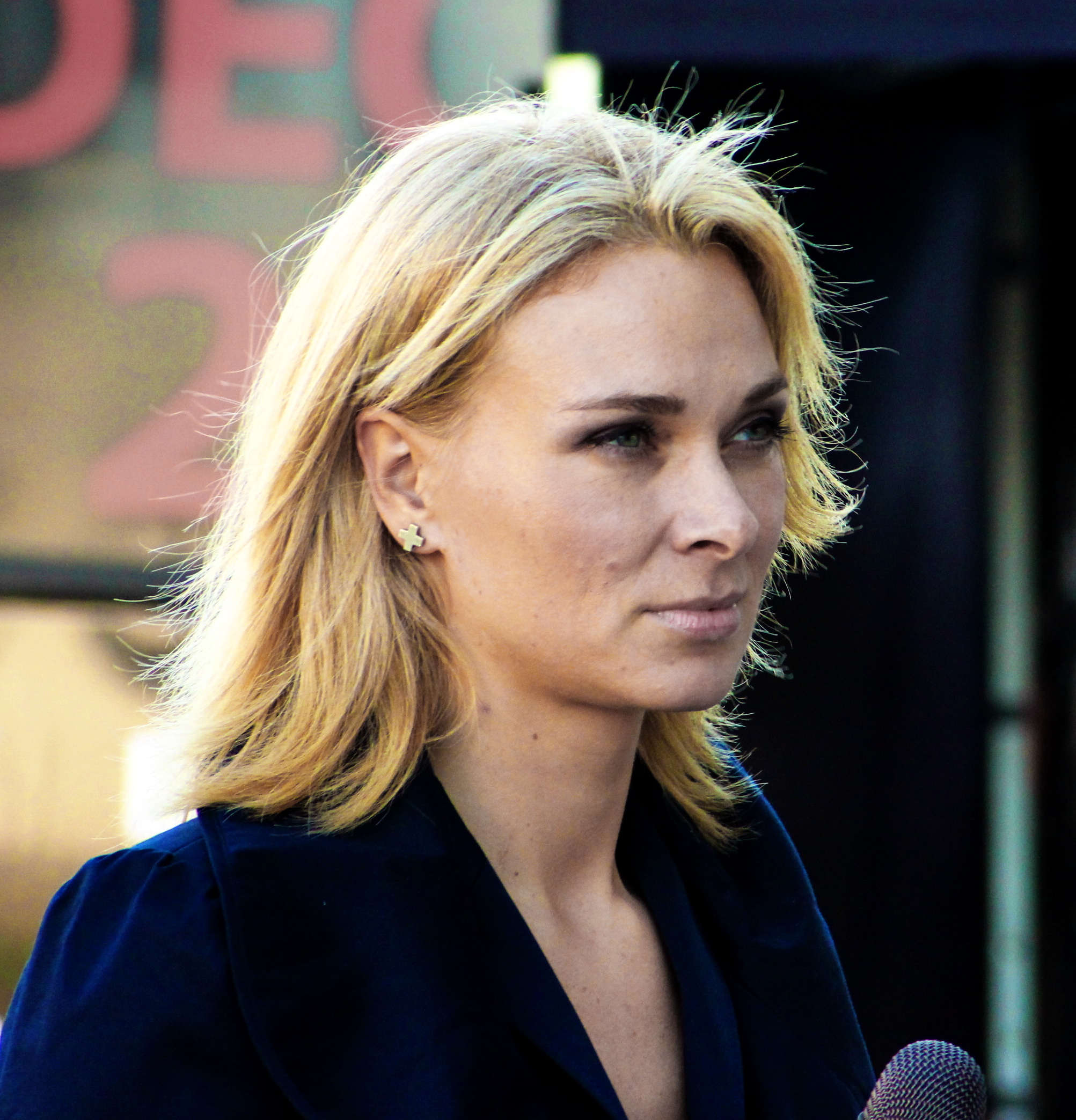
- Britta Hofmann in Munich in 2012
- Born: 25 February 1980 (age 46); Attendorn, North Rhine-Westphalia, Germany
- Occupations: Journalist, television presenter
- Years active: 2005–present (television)
- Television: N-tv (2005–2011); Sky Deutschland (2011–present)

Britta Hofmann (born 25 February 1980) is a German journalist and television presenter.

== Early life and education ==
Britta Hofmann was born in Attendorn in the region of North Rhine-Westphalia, and spent her first three years of her life in her hometown. She then moved to Hamm with her father, where she spent the rest of her childhood. After graduating with her Abitur in 1999, she studied from 2000 to 2005 and graduated with a sports science diploma at the German Sport University Cologne.

== Television career ==
After completing her studies, Hofmann completed a traineeship at N-tv from 2006 to 2008, where in addition to sports she also presented the news on the program. From 2005 to 2011, she was a sports presenter of the daily news on the same channel. In addition to presenting, she also worked as a live reporter, where she reported for example on N-tv and RTL Television for the 2008 Summer Olympics in Beijing and the 2010 Winter Olympics in Vancouver.

In December 2011, she joined the channel Sky Deutschland, where she mainly works as a presenter for Sky Sport News HD. Before switching to teams of presenters, she initially formed a permanent presenting pair with Martin Winkler and presented sports news from all over the world. Since the 2012–2013 season, she worked for Sky Sport at the football Bundesliga as a field reporter. Since the beginning of the 2015–2016 season, she presented the UEFA Europa League on Sky and since August 2017 the Bundesliga program Super Samstag. During the 2020 COVID-19 pandemic, Hofmann became the presenter of the new program Dein Verein, in which various German football clubs and their greatest moments are presented. Even after that, the format with Hofmann remained a permanent section in Sky's program, but from then on served as a preview show for the upcoming Bundesliga matchday.
