= Viega =

Manufacturing company

Viega LLC
- Viega logo

- Viega World seminar center in Attendorn-Ennest, Germany (2023)
- Type: Limited liability company (LLC)
- Industry: Building materials
- Founded: 1899 (Attendorn, Germany), 1999 (Wichita, Kansas, United States)
- Headquarters: Broomfield, CO, United States
- Key people: Walter Viegener (owner), Claus Holst-Gydesen (CEO DE), Dave Garlow (CEO US)
- Products: HVAC and plumbing systems
- Website: www.viega.us

Viega is a family owned international manufacturer of Plumbing and HVAC solutions. Viega sells PEX for Radiant heating and plumbing systems along with copper, stainless, and metal alloy pipe along with mechanical pressure fitting products.

Viega at Plumbex India 2026, BIEC

== History ==
Founded in 1899 in Germany by Franz Viegener, the company started as a manufacturer of brass beer taps for taverns and breweries. In 1901, the company started manufacturing plumbing products.

== Innovation ==
In 1995 Viega presented press technology that joined copper and PEX tubing to plumbing fittings. Products like Viega's ProPress and MANABLOC define a trend to mitigate installation errors. Green or innovative buildings use Viega or other related products for radiant heating and snow melt applications. Reduction of water consumption increases the mixing of water tubing and pipe size to minimize the in process water to the user.

Viega has awards from ISH 2007 and 2008 ASPE Industry Award among others. Viega builds to represent its products and innovation.

== Products ==
=== ProPress ===
ProPress is a series of products based on copper pressed fittings. These fittings do not require sweating copper pipe with tin and lead solder.

=== PureFlow MANABLOC ===
MANABLOC is a manifold type product that allows the management of fluids to plumbing fixtures. Each leg of the manifold has a valve to enable maintenance.

=== ProRadiant ===
ProRadiant is a series of products to assist in the installation of radiant heating. These products manage PEX tubing installation on or in a building floor.

=== Visign ===
Push button interfaces for bathroom controls.

=== Others ===
Round Design Grates, Quick Connect Gas Outlets

=== MegaPress ===
MegaPress is system for joining black iron pipe for use on SCH 5-40 suitable for natural gas and mechanical applications. Fittings range in size from 1/2" - 4".

=== GEOPRESS ===
There are two types of GEOPRESS: GEOPRESS K and GEOPRESS Gas. These systems can be used for dispensing drinking water, gas, and even hydrogen. The name "GEOPRESS" is derived from "geography." There has been a legal dispute between Viega and Swiss Fittings, questioning the similarity of the brand "GOPRESS." The GEOPRESS System holds a DVGW certificate and is installed using a press ring.

== Markets ==
Viega has offices and or manufacturing plants in Germany, Denmark, Finland, Italy, Hungary, Netherlands, Norway, Poland, Sweden, Belgium, Canada, Australia, and the United States.
