= Holy Trinity High School =

Holy Trinity High School Kenema may refer to:

== United Kingdom ==
- Holy Trinity School, Crawley, Crawley, West Sussex

== United States ==
- Holy Trinity Diocesan High School, in Hicksville, New York
- Holy Trinity High School (Chicago), in Chicago, Illinois
- Holy Trinity High School (Fort Madison, Iowa)
- Holy Trinity High School (Winsted, Minnesota), in Winsted, Minnesota
- Holy Trinity High School (Roxbury, Massachusetts), former Catholic high school for girls, located in Roxbury, Massachusetts

== Canada ==
- Holy Trinity Catholic Secondary School (Oakville), in Oakville, Ontario
- Holy Trinity High School (Bradford), in Bradford, Ontario
- Holy Trinity Academy (Drayton Valley), in Drayton Valley, Alberta
- Holy Trinity Catholic High School (Edmonton), in Edmonton, Alberta
- Holy Trinity High School (Torbay), in Torbay, Newfoundland

== Jamaica ==
- Holy Trinity High School, Jamaica

== See also ==
- Holy Trinity School (disambiguation)
- Holy Trinity Catholic High School (disambiguation)
