= Schnellenberg Castle =

Coordinates: 51.1241°N 7.9260°E

Schnellenberg Castle (de: Burg Schnellenberg) is a hilltop fortress in the Olpe district between the Biggesee and Attendorn in the district of North Rhine-Westphalia, Germany. It is a prominent high-altitude castle overlooking the Biggetal valley. The castle is said to be the largest hilltop castle in the Sauerland area and has been in the ownership of the family of the Baron of Fürstenberg-Herdringen since 1594. This castle is a notable Westphalian architectural monument and a popular destination in southern Sauerland, currently housing a hotel and restaurant with views across the landscape between the Ebbe and Rothaar mountain ranges.

The Baroque castle was first mentioned in 1222 and owned by the von Fürstenberg family since 1594. Undergoing extensive renovations from 1594 onward, the castle includes a 16th-century Renaissance Chapel, an underground cellar, a restaurant in the Gobelin Hall, and a Knights Hall, in addition to providing conference facilities. The castle retains its medieval features, such as watchtowers, stone archways, and a treasure chamber with historical artifacts, reflecting its long history.

== History ==
=== Founding in 1222 ===
Built in 1222, Schnellenberg castle occupies a strategically advantageous mountain spur above the southern bank of the Bigge. It was initiated at the same time as the Attendorn town fortifications were erected, constructed at the direction of Archbishop Engelbert von Berg of Cologne to secure the "Heidenstraße", a significant trade route crossing the Bigge near Attendorn, as documented in an agreement with the Counts of der Mark, who was granted two fiefs within the castle.

=== Expansion after 1291 under Johann von Plettenberg ===
In 1288, after the Archbishop of Cologne suffered a defeat in the Battle of Worringen, the Cologne castle of Waldenburg, located just over three kilometers southwest of Schnellenberg, had to be ceded to the Count von der Mark in 1289 as a pledge. To compensate for this loss, Johann I von Plettenberg, Marshal of the Duchy of Westphalia, oversaw the reconstruction and fortification of Schnellenberg Castle around 1291, with the assistance of the citizens of Attendorn. In 1294, Archbishop Siegfried von Westerburg of Cologne promised the citizens of Attendorn, who had helped build the Castrum Snellenberch, that the castle would never be used to harm them.

The significance of Schnellenberg Castle quickly declined after the pledged castle of Waldenburg was redeemed by Archbishop Wigbold von Holte in 1300. Following the redemption, von Holte appointed Johann von Plettenberg, who had lent him 700 marks, as Drosten of the greatly expanded administrative unit of Amt Waldenburg, further reducing Schnellenberg's prominence.

After the death of Johannes von Plettenberg, his son Heidenreich returned Schnellenberg Castle to Archbishop Walram von Jülich of Cologne. A deed dated 12 July 1339 records this transfer, stating: "To all who will see or hear the present deed, we Heidenrich von Plettenberg, son of the deceased knight, Lord Johannes von Plettenberg, and his wife Pyronetta, announce and confess through the contents of the present deed, that we, for ourselves and our heirs purely and simply, of our own accord and free will, have handed over and entrusted to our most venerable lord, Lord Walram, Archbishop of Cologne and his church of Cologne, because of the special affection, and the favours granted to us by our Lord himself, Schnellenberg Castle, built by my, Heidenreich's, deceased father, and the jurisdiction over the town of Attendorn and all its appurtenances, once acquired by him with his own money, renouncing all rights which we or our said heirs or any of them are or may be entitled to in the said castle and jurisdiction and its appurtenances ...’.

=== Ownership of the feudal lords Vogt von Elspe and von Schnellenberg after 1339 ===
The Archbishop subsequently appointed various officials, including the governors of Elspe, to serve as castle guards at Schnellenberg. In 1337, Goswin and Hermann von Schnellenberg also resided in the castle, seemingly sharing the space with the governors of Elspe. In 1387, in addition to the Schnellenberg family, the squire, Wilhelm Vogt von Elspe appears as a castle guard. In 1411, Archbishop Friedrich of Cologne granted permission to Grete, the widow of Wilhelm Vogt von Elspe, and her children to construct a house within Schnellenberg Castle so they could reside there and improve their castle fief.

In 1441, a division occurred between the brothers Johann, Heinrich, Wilhelm, and Dietrich Vogt von Elspe and Johann von Schnellenberg zu Schnellenberg. Johann von Schnellenberg retained his house with the tower in Schnellenberg, along with the house on the lower side of the Porten, referred to as "der Vögte altes Haus," as well as three-quarters of the fields and meadows associated with the castle. It was agreed that, in the event of a feud, the von Schnellenbergs and the bailiffs of Elspe would support each other.

=== Acquisition of the castle by the von Fürstenberg family in 1594 ===
When the Cologne Elector and Archbishop Gebhardt Truchsess von Waldburg converted to Protestantism in 1583, Kaspar von Fürstenberg remained a loyal Catholic and opposed his sovereign out of conviction. After Gebhardt was deposed, the new Elector, Ernst of Bavaria, recognised Kaspar as a faithful supporter. Kaspar, who served as the bailiff of the Waldenburg and Fredeburg districts then purchased Schnellenberg castle in 1594 though it was in a state of disrepair. The purchase agreements were made between Kaspar von Fürstenberg zu Bilstein and Bernhard Vogt von Elspe zu Borghausen, along with Hennecke Schungel, regarding their shares in the Schnellenberg estate.

Rumors of the castle's imperial status began circulating after its acquisition. In 1595, after Kaspar von Fürstenberg was accepted into the imperial knighthood, he applied for imperial immediacy for the castle. Kaspar von Fürstenberg initiated extensive reconstruction efforts which spanned over 12 years, and in 1607 he relocated from his former residence at Bilstein Castle, near today’s Lennestadt, to Schnellenberg Castle. As a plant collector and garden enthusiast, Kaspar dedicated nearly 25 years to developing various gardens around the castle, traces of which remain today. Kaspar's diaries document his ongoing involvement in developing the castle gardens alongside the castle’s construction. His entries frequently describe days spent planting, refining fruit trees, or overseeing garden construction. He commissioned the installation of irrigation pipes, the building of wells, and the construction of walls for terraced areas. The gardens were established in various locations around the castle, which at the time consisted only of what is now the Oberburg. His notes mention a "small vineyard garden for the porten," a tree garden (then a term for a fruit tree garden) "base under the fastenbergh," a "newly made garden in front of the house," and a "cake garden at the vurwerk." The six existing fish ponds also date back to his time, with structural remains indicating a mill he built in 1596 near the fifth pond. Kaspar lived at the castle with his second wife, Enneke, for five years until his appointment as Landdroste in 1613, after which they moved to Arnsberg, where he died in 1618.

In the generations following Kaspar von Fürstenberg, the castle underwent significant development, including enhancements to the gardens. Intensive construction activities led to the current three-part structure established in 1686. Ferdinand von Fürstenberg (1661–1718), Kaspar’s great-grandson, constructed the large outer bailey between 1687 and 1694, which now houses the hotel. Designed similarly to a hunting lodge, it included numerous rooms for guests and stables.

Plans from the early 18th century provide insight into the possible Baroque design of the gardens. Although the designer remains unknown, the plans may have originated from architect Gottfried Laurenz Pictorius (1663–1729), known for projects like the Prince-Bishop’s Residence Palace in Nordkirchen, Münsterland. The plans depict symmetrical arrangements typical of Baroque style, featuring a central axis with a fountain leading to a cascade adorned with figures. A series of steps, still visible today, connected to a higher garden section divided by square beds, with a side staircase leading to a pavilion. Water from nearby hills was channeled into a reservoir to supply the garden’s water features, hinting at the opulent courtly life that once animated these now partially fallow grounds.

In 1671, the town of Attendorn confirmed that the von Fürstenberg family had never been obligated to pay taxes or treasure to the town. The captains of the knighthood in Friedberg therefore requested the family to display the imperial eagle as a symbol of imperial immediacy. The Elector, who had previously remained silent on the matter, ordered an investigation in 1698, and in 1701, the electoral court chancellery in Bonn ordered that the request for the imperial symbol display be granted. In 1708, further expansions to the castle added the farm and the lower castle area.

In 1785, Elector Maximilian Franz called Baron Clemens Lothar von Fürstenberg to account for an expression used in a document and ordered the Schnellenberg house to be incorporated into the Cologne Brand Society. Baron Clemens Lothar von Fürstenberg took legal action against this order and obtained favourable rulings in the lower courts in 1785 and 1789. In the course of these proceedings, he had his membership of the Imperial Knighthood re-certified in 1791.

The final decision was not made until 1802, when the Hesse-Darmstadt government and the Duchy of Westphalia took possession of Schnellenberg Castle. On 17 September 1812, the Court of Appeal in Darmstadt finally ruled in Fürstenberg's favour after 217 years, stating that Schnellenberg Castle had been directly owned and property of the Reich Empire under the old imperial constitution.

The castle remained the residence of the Fürstenberg family until they moved their main residence to Herdringen Castle near Arnsberg.

== St George's Chapel ==
The St. George's Chapel (de: St.-Georg-Kapelle), located in the upper castle, is a notable feature, built in the Mannerist style and preserved in its original form from 1599.

The chapel measures four by four meters with a seven-meter-high ceiling. The design was crafted by Frankfurt artists commissioned by the Fürstenberg family. Kaspar von Fürstenberg oversaw its construction, with funding provided by his brother, Bishop Dietrich von Fürstenberg (prince-bishop of Paderborn). Sculptor Johann Hocheisen created the stonework, carver Hans Miltenberger contributed intricate wooden inlays, and painter Augustin Jodefeld of Paderborn completed the setting. This mannerist-style furnishing is considered unique within Westphalia. Numerous Old Testament inscriptions over the woodwork and ceiling reflect the deep piety of the Fürstenberg family.

The altar, positioned in front of a window on the east side, is flanked by two seats of honor: to the right, the seat of Prince-Bishop Dietrich von Fürstenberg, framed by niche architecture, and to the left, the choir seat of his brother, the castle lord Kaspar von Fürstenberg, beneath a canopy holding a wooden spike. Wooden galleries are also found on the north and west sides of the chapel.

The chapel treasure was commissioned by Bishop Dietrich and silver-forged for his brother Kaspar. The treasure is recognized as a masterpiece of German silversmithing from the late Renaissance and remains in the possession of the family at Haus Herdringen near Neheim.

The chapel's paintings, whitewashed in 1837, were restored in 1974. The portrait of the Bishop Dietrich on the ceiling, is painted as the likeness of Saint Jakobus.

The chapel currently houses a semi-precious religious relic in the form of a circular plate of the semi precious stone, situated directly in front of the altar.

== Gallery ==
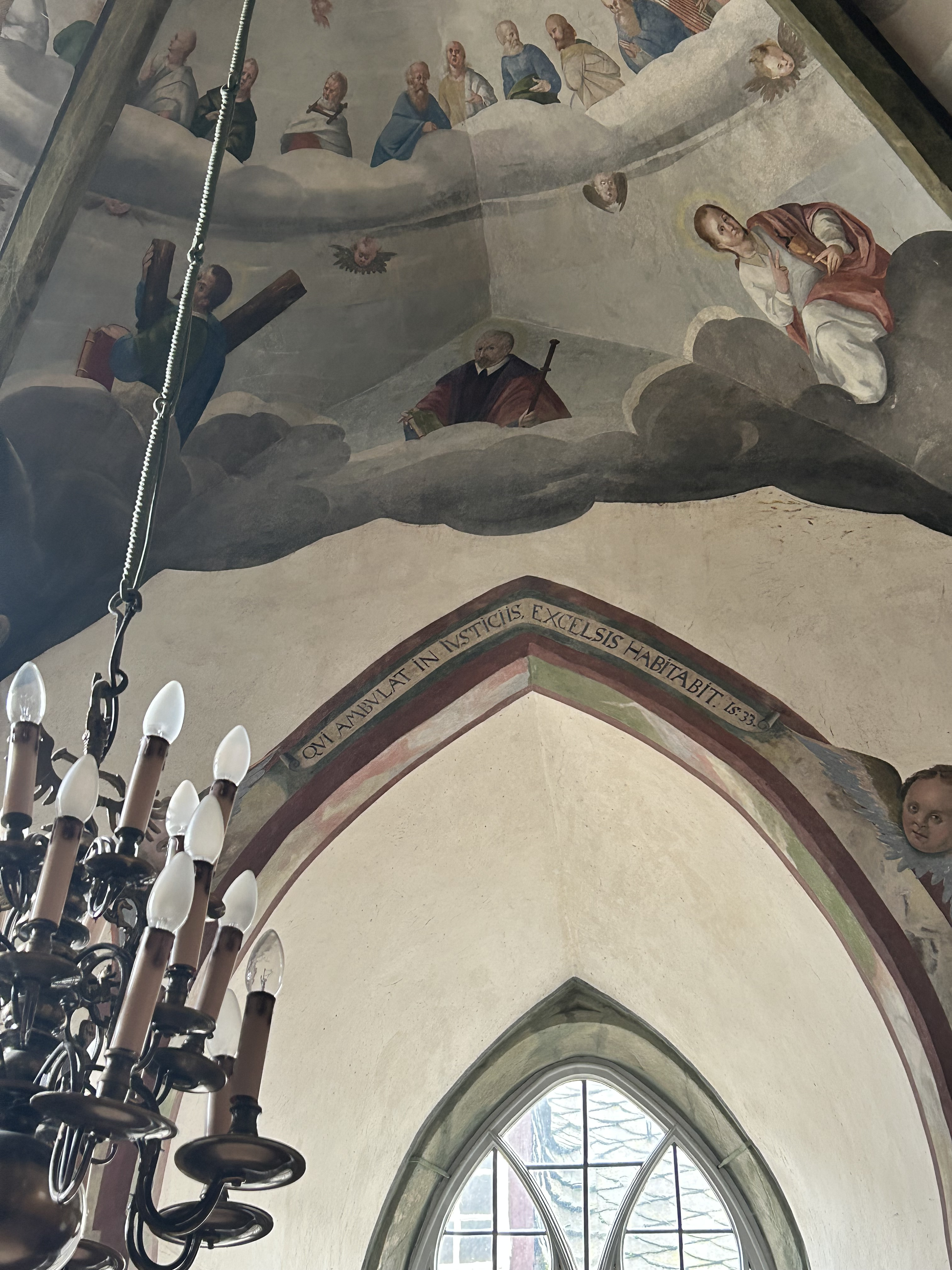
Ceiling portrait of the prince-bishop above the window apex, in St George's Chapel at Burg Schnellenburg

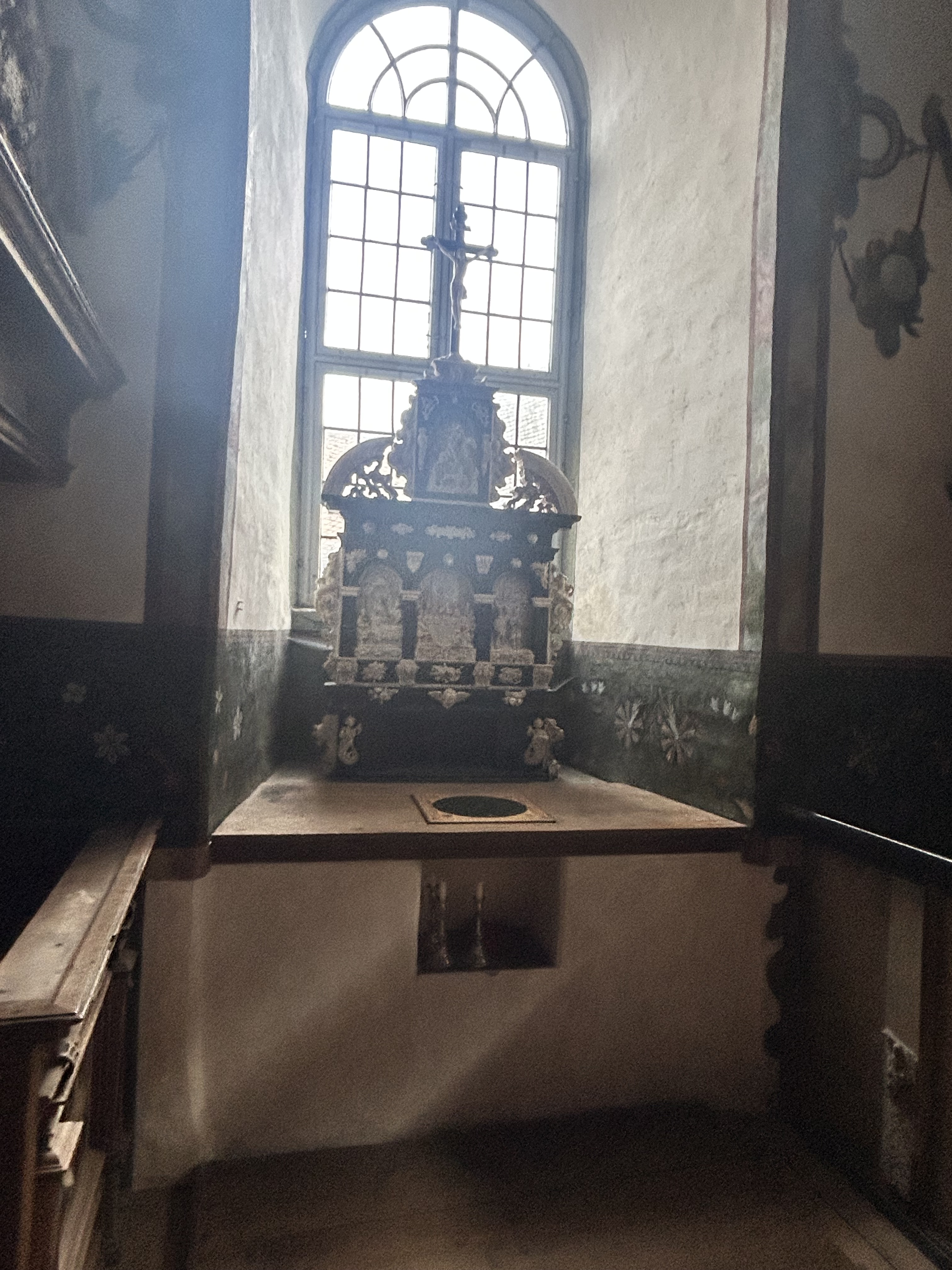
The altar dedicated to St George in St George's Chapel at Burg Schnellenberg with the semi precious relic in front

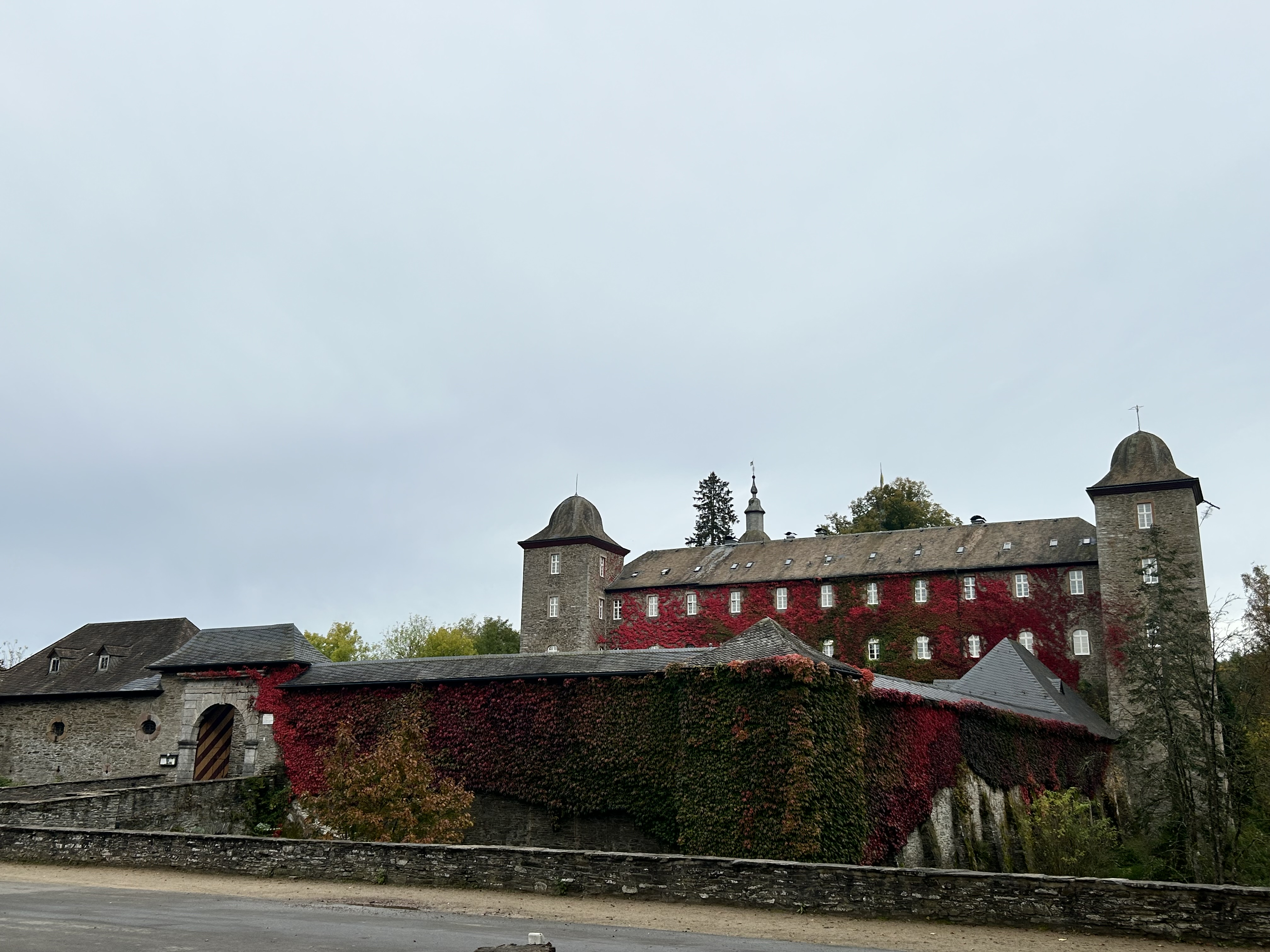
Burg Schnellenberg from the main entrance road
