= Holy Trinity Episcopal Church (Spring Lake, New Jersey) =

Historic church in New Jersey, United States

- U.S. National Register of Historic Places
- New Jersey Register of Historic Places
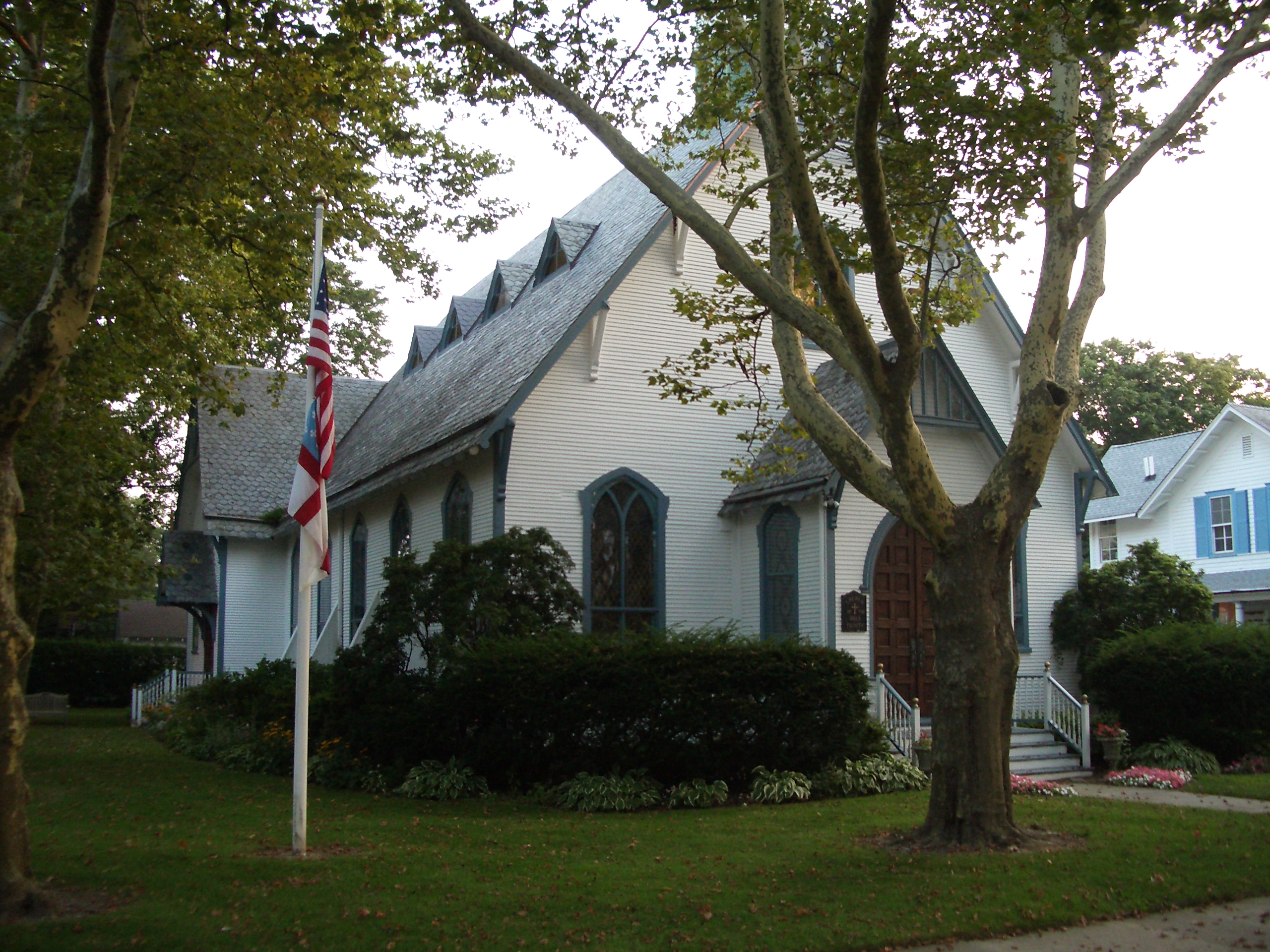

- Location within Monmouth County, New Jersey Location within New Jersey Location within the United States
- Location: Jct. of Monmouth and Third Avenues, Spring Lake, New Jersey
- Coordinates: 40°8′46″N 74°1′52″W
- Area: 1 acre (0.40 ha)
- Built: 1880
- Architectural style: Stick/Eastlake, Gothic Revival
- MPS: Spring Lake, NJ as a Coastal Resort MPS
- NRHP reference No.: 91000116
- NJRHP No.: 2058

Significant dates
- Added to NRHP: March 08, 1991
- Designated NJRHP: January 14, 1991

Holy Trinity Episcopal Church is a historic church at the junction of Monmouth and Third Avenues in Spring Lake, Monmouth County, New Jersey, United States.

It was built in 1880 and added to the National Register of Historic Places in 1991.

The church houses a fully functional 1904 Bates & Culley pipe organ.
