= Holy Trinity College Bromley =

Former school in London, England

Coordinates: 51.4113°N 0.0275°E

Holy Trinity College Bromley' (formerly Holy Trinity Convent) was an all-girls infant, junior and senior school located in the London Borough of Bromley, England from the mid-19th century to December 2005.

It was a direct grant-aided grammar school until the 1980s when it became purely independent. The school was administered by the Trinitarian Sisters of Valence order of Roman Catholic nuns along with a sister school in Kidderminster (which reverted to secular control in the 1980s.) The mother house of the Trinitarian order is in France.

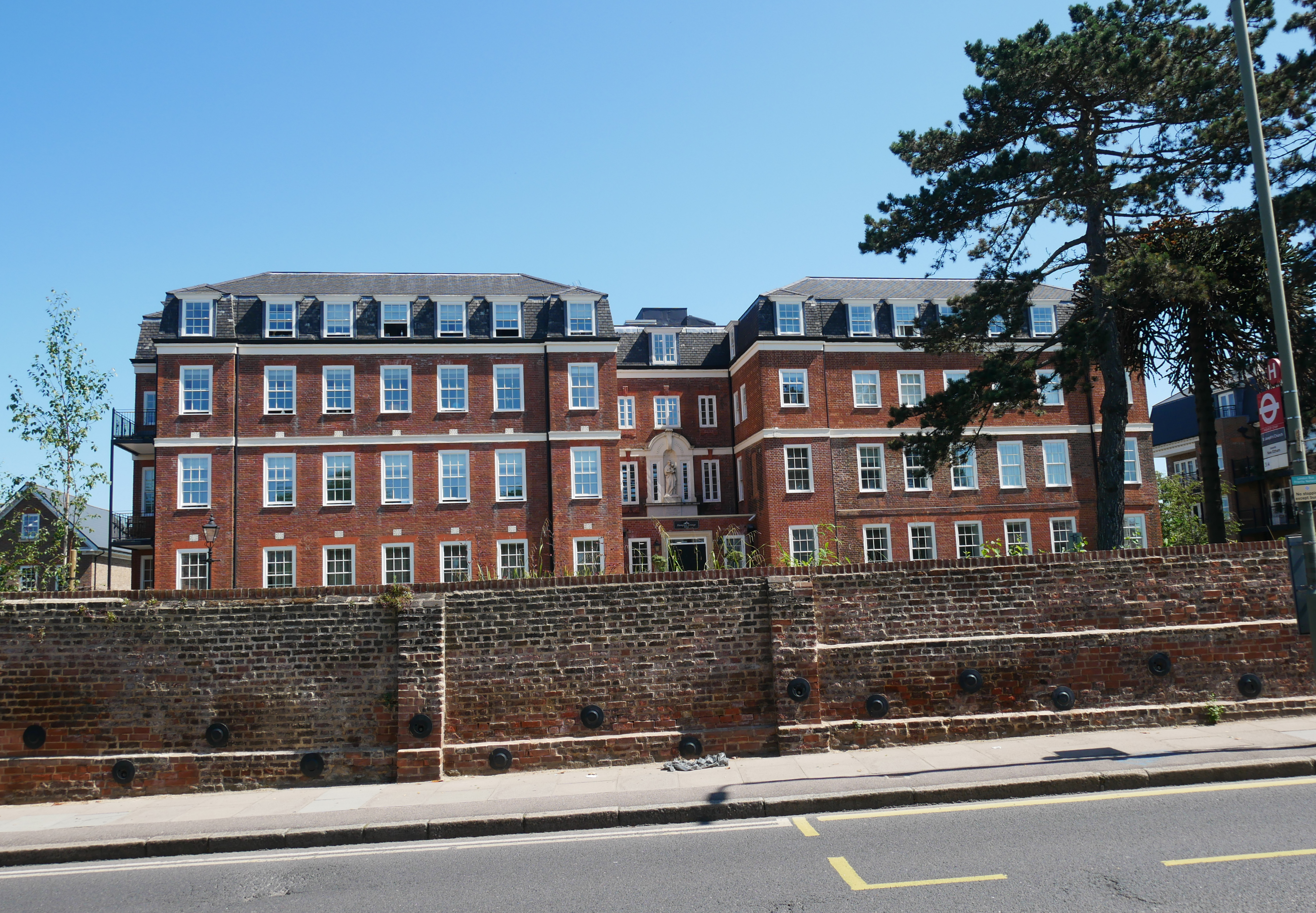

The school closed officially on 15 December 2005, although by this time there weren't any pupils left in the school as they had all been relocated to various other, mainly independent, schools in the area.

Although the school is now closed there is still a Trinitarian convent on the site, living in a new convent building. The site has now been redeveloped for housing.
