= Holy Trinity Academy =

Holy Trinity Academy may refer to:

- Holy Trinity Academy (Drayton Valley), Drayton Valley, Canada
- Holy Trinity Academy (Okotoks), Okotoks, Canada
- Holy Trinity Academy (Philippines), Manila, Philippines
- Holy Trinity Academy, Telford, England

== See also ==
- Holy Trinity (disambiguation)
- Holy Trinity College (disambiguation)
- Holy Trinity School (disambiguation)
