= Home Technology Association =

Home technology integration dealership organisation

- Founded: 2017
- Website: htacertified.org

The Home Technology Association is an American industry organization for home technology integration dealerships.

== Certification ==
The Home Technology Association runs the HTA Certified certification program, which began in 2017. Certification is applied for by home technology integration firms in the United States and Canada, and indicates the top 10% to 15% of home technology installation dealers within a particular market. In addition to running the certification process, the program also administers the "Best in the US" awards for the home technology integration industry and is an industry advocate for the home technology integration trade to architects, interior designers and general contractors.

HTA certification is provided by the Home Technology Association to home technology integration dealers, and is based upon installation experience and business practices, including a history of technical competence, marketplace reputation, and quality of aftercare service and support. Additional criteria for certification includes a five year absence of bankruptcy, proper liability insurance, and others. Certified dealers are provided with resources such as a budgeting tool for dealers to set transparent pricing, in addition to other onboarding tools.

=== Tools ===
In 2017 the Home Technology Association’s technology created a budget estimator tool for home design and build employees and consumers, in order to provide brand agnostic installed-cost estimates for home technology systems.
