= Holy Trinity College, Catholic University of Zimbabwe =

College in Harare, Zimbabwe

Holy Trinity College
- Location: 149, Enterprise Road, Highlands, Harare, Zimbabwe; 17.7919°S 31.1039°E
- Website: www.holytrinity.ac.zw

Holy Trinity College is a theological college in Highlands, Harare, Zimbabwe founded in August 2003. It is an associate college of the Catholic University of Zimbabwe and was founded by several Roman Catholic religious orders: Redemptorists CSsR, Franciscans OFM and Carmelite O Carm. The board of directors is made up of senior officials of these orders.
