= Holy Trinity Greek Orthodox Church (Tulsa, Oklahoma) =

Coordinates: 36°08′38″N 95°59′47″W

The Holy Trinity Greek Orthodox Church is a Greek Orthodox church in Tulsa, Oklahoma. It was incorporated May 20, 1925 to serve immigrants from Greece who adhered to the Greek Orthodox faith. After holding a fund drive to raise money for construction of a church, the founding members bought three city lots at Eleventh Street and South Guthrie Avenue in Tulsa, where they built their first sanctuary. The groundbreaking was held in May, 1927, and the first service occurred in March, 1928.

The congregation began hosting an annual Greek Festival to celebrate its ancestral culture.

In 1968, the congregation decided to build a new sanctuary building at 1222 South Guthrie. The first service there was held on September 21, 1969.
