= Holy Trinity Episcopal Church (Fallon, Nevada) =

Historic church in Nevada, United States

- U.S. National Register of Historic Places
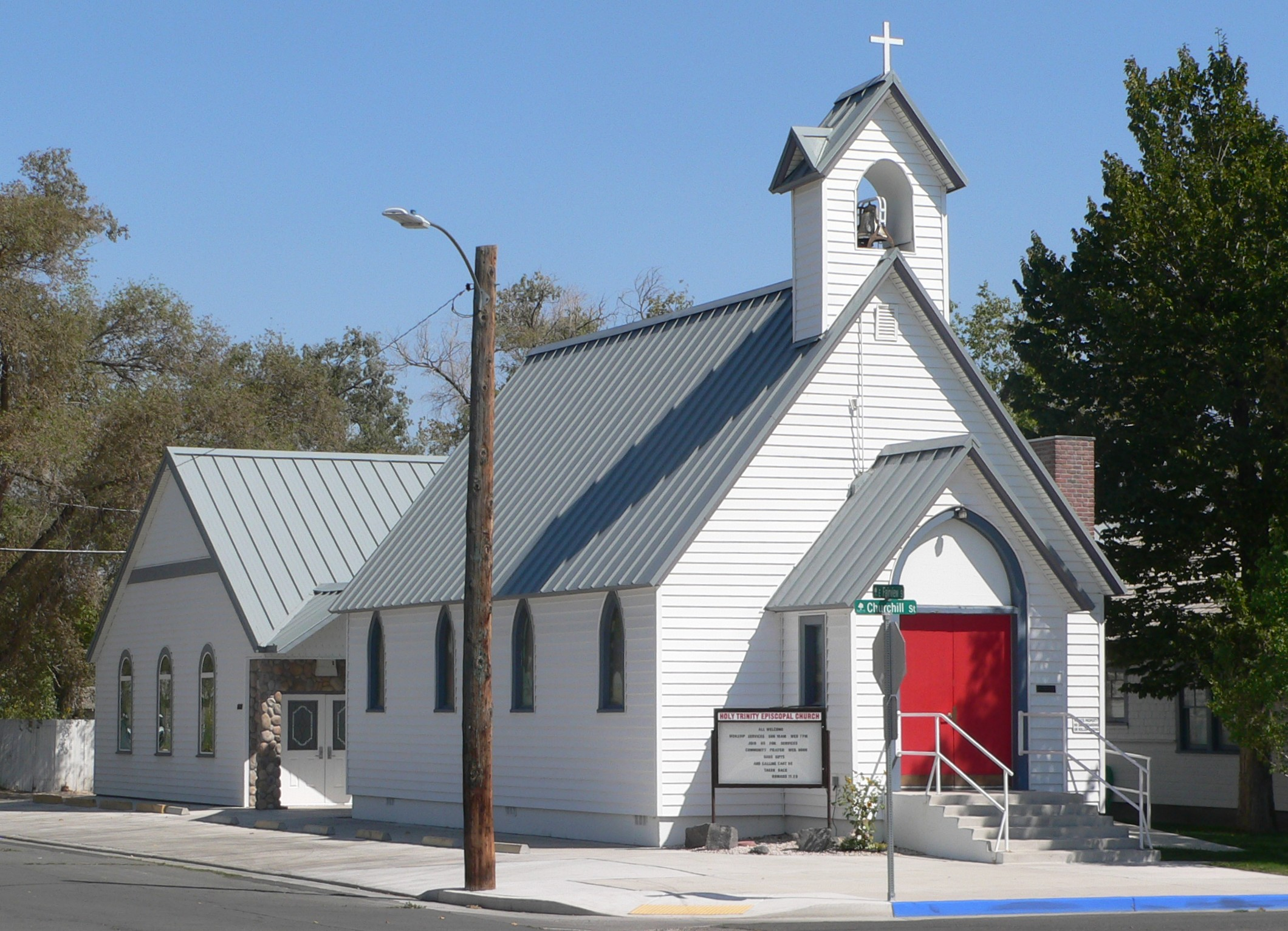
- View from the northwest

- Location within Nevada Location within the United States
- Location: 507 Churchill St., Fallon, Nevada
- Coordinates: 39°28′12.65″N 118°46′32.4″W
- Built: 1907, 1922, 1924
- Built by: Jones, T.A. & Co. (church); Pierce, William G. (vicarage and guildhall)
- Architectural style: Gothic Revival, Bungalow, American Craftsman
- NRHP reference No.: 03000413
- Added to NRHP: May 16, 2003

The Holy Trinity Episcopal Church in Fallon, Nevada, located at 507 Churchill St., was built in 1907 in the Gothic Revival style. It was listed on the National Register of Historic Places in 2003; the listing included four contributing buildings, some of which were in the American Craftsman style or built like bungalows. Besides the 1907 church, included in the listing are a 1922 vicarage, a 1922 garage, and a 1924 Guildhall.

It was deemed significant for association with growth of Fallon during 1907 through the 1920s as "tangible reminders of this significant early period in Fallon's history."
