= Holy Trinity Greek Orthodox Church (Wilmington, Delaware) =

Greek Orthodox cathedral in Delaware, US

Coordinates: 39.749809°N 75.562754°W

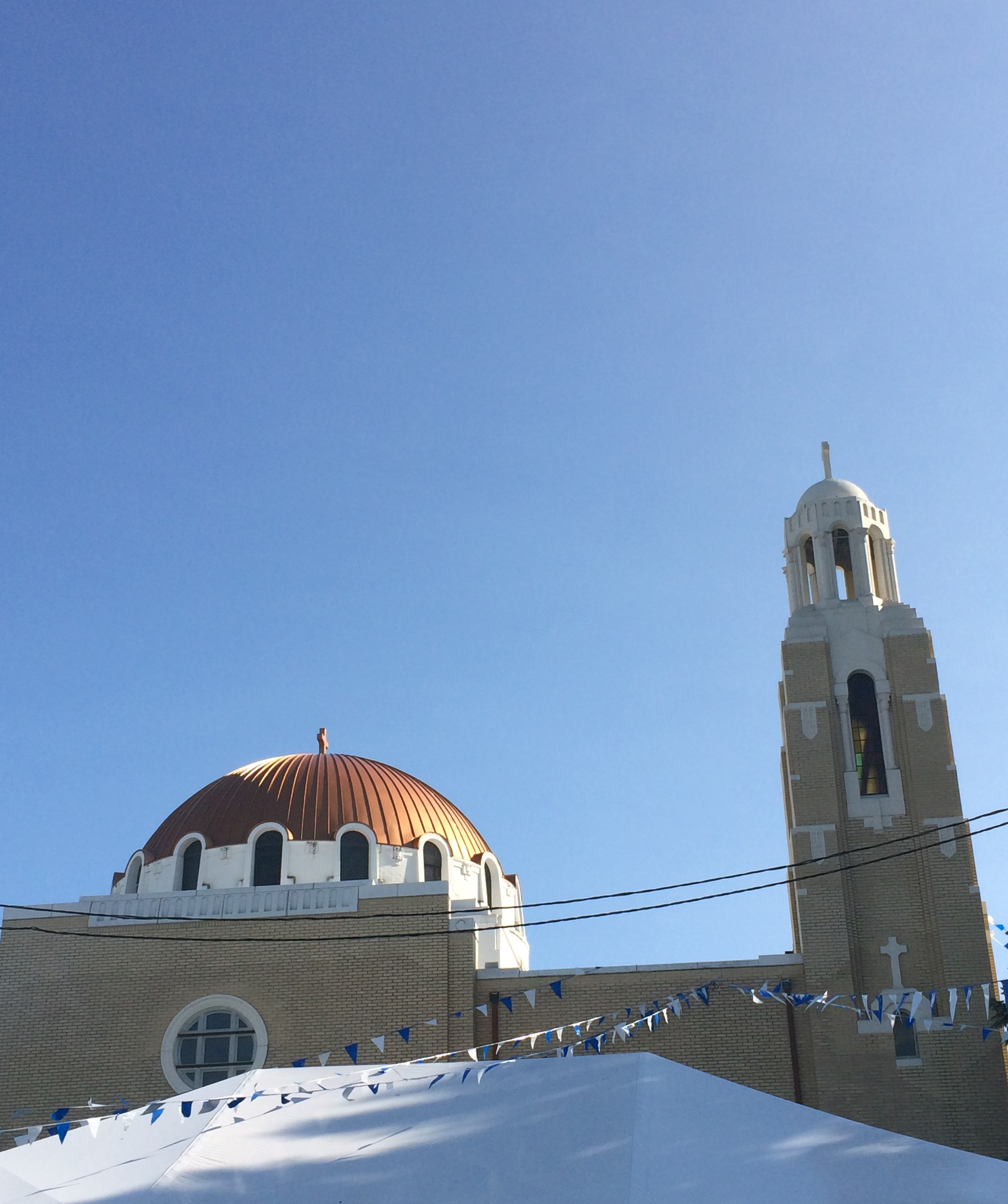
Holy Trinity Greek Orthodox Cathedral in Wilmington, Delaware

Holy Trinity Greek Orthodox Cathedral is a Greek Orthodox Church in Wilmington, Delaware. Established in 1934, the church is an important part of the Greek community in Wilmington. The church complex also contains a Greek community center, and is the site of the church's annual Greek festival.
