= Holy Trinity Catholic High School (Fort McMurray) =

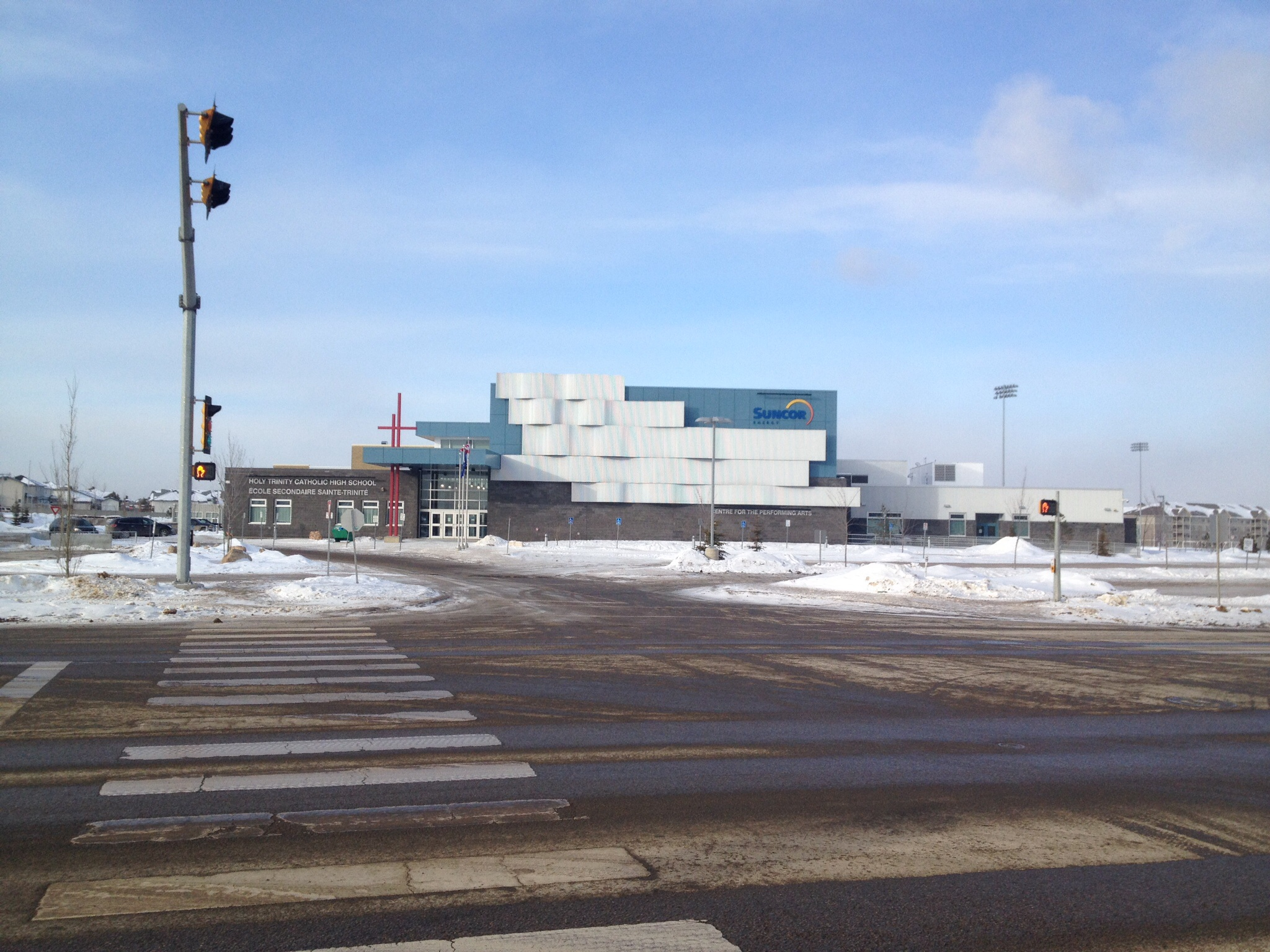
- Holy Trinity Catholic High School in February 2014

Location
- 230 Powder Drive; Fort McMurray, Alberta, T9K 0W8; Canada

Information
- School type: Middle School/High School
- Founded: 2009, opened on August 29, 2011
- School board: Fort McMurray Catholic School District
- Administrator: Mrs. Lou Ann Demersnoble (Principal); Mrs. Jennifer Fricker- Macdougall (VP), Mrs. Van Den Hoogen (VP), Mr. Kevin Garbuio (VP)
- Grades: 7-12
- Language: English, French
- Colours: Green, Gold
- Team name: Northern Knights
- Website: holytrinity.fmcschools.ca

Holy Trinity Catholic High School is a Roman Catholic middle school / high school operated in Fort McMurray, Alberta by the Fort McMurray Catholic School District. It includes a Suncor Energy Performing Arts Theatre used for both school and general purposes. Class start times begin at 8:10 with each block lasting 60 minutes for the junior high students, and 90 minutes for the high school students. Classes end at 3:00 for both middle and high school. The overall school attendance is 1200.

== Name ==
Holy Trinity is named by the three sections of the trinity, The Father, The Son, and The Holy Spirit.

== Sports ==
The school's sports teams are known as the "Northern Knights" and their mascot is a knight (chess).

== Suncor Energy Center for Performing Arts ==
The creation of the facility was funded with the assistance of Suncor Energy and the Regional Municipality of Wood Buffalo who donated $4.5 Million to incorporate a Performing Arts Centre in Holy Trinity High School's Design. The centre will serve Holy Trinity and the Fort McMurray Catholic School District as a major instructional space, with many specialized programs focused on Visual and Performing Arts; and as a part of the Regional Municipality's continuing support, the centre will be a cultural hub open for community use.
