= Holy Trinity Anglican Church =

Holy Trinity Anglican Church may refer to:

== Australia ==
- Holy Trinity Anglican Church, Berrima, New South Wales
- Holy Trinity Anglican Church, Baulkham Hills, New South Wales
- Holy Trinity Anglican Church, Chatswood in Sydney, New South Wales
- Holy Trinity Anglican Church, Kelso, New South Wales
- Holy Trinity Church, Orange, New South Wales
- Holy Trinity Church, Grenfell, New South Wales
- Holy Trinity Church, Fortitude Valley, Brisbane, Queensland
- Holy Trinity Anglican Church, Herberton, Queensland
- Holy Trinity Anglican Church, Woolloongabba, Brisbane, Queensland
- Holy Trinity Church, Adelaide, South Australia
- Holy Trinity Anglican Church, Coburg, Victoria
- Holy Trinity Anglican Church, Waubra, Victoria
- Holy Trinity Anglican Church, Northampton, Western Australia
- Holy Trinity Anglican Church, Roebourne, Western Australia

== Canada ==
- Holy Trinity Anglican Church (Winnipeg), Manitoba
- Holy Trinity Anglican Church (Alma, Prince Edward Island)
- Holy Trinity Anglican Church (Maple Grove, Quebec)
- Holy Trinity Anglican Church (Stanley Mission, Saskatchewan)

== Elsewhere ==
- Holy Trinity Anglican Church, Raleigh, United States
- Holy Trinity Anglican Church (Singapore)

== See also ==
- Holy Trinity Church (disambiguation)
- Holy Trinity Episcopal Church (disambiguation)
