= Hawaii Technology Academy =

Charter school in Hawaii, United States

- 94-450 Mokuola Street; Waipahu, Hawaii 9679; United States

Information
- Type: Non-Profit Public Charter School
- Founded: 2006
- Key products: Education software, textbooks, workbooks
- Communities served: Honolulu, Maui, Kauai, Hawaii, Molokai
- Website: hi.myhta.org

Hawaii Technology Academy (HTA) is a public charter school in the U.S. state of Hawaii.

== About ==
Hawaii Technology Academy (HTA) is a public charter school in Hawai'i that serves near to 1,700 students across the islands of Kaua'i, Maui, O'ahu and Hawai'i Island, with the largest on Oahu. HTA uses a blended learning model. It uses a combination of face-to-face instruction, virtual instruction, and independent learning. An involved Learning Coach, or adult responsible for mentoring, monitoring and motivating students' learning at home is a defining aspect of HTA.

== Education style ==
HTA offers students a blended experience with face-to-face and virtual instruction as well as independent learning. Students receive face-to-face instruction from teachers at their designated learning center, or live instruction from a teacher through the use of a virtual learning platform. Students also work from home with their parent as a learning coach to complete online and teacher-created curriculum.

== Location ==
HTA's main office and primary learning center is currently located in Waipahu, Hawaii. HTA operates across the entire state, with learning centers in Hilo and Kona, as well as other learning locations across Maui and Kauai.

During summer 2016, HTA moved its Oahu building to 94-450 Mokuola Street, Waipahu, Hawaii.

HTA serves students in four main locations:

- Hawaii Island - West
- Kauai
- Maui
- Oahu

== Population ==
Total enrollment for the 2014–2015 school year was 1123 students. There were 748 students in grades K-8 and 375 students in high school.

== Technology ==
HTA uses a "Bring Your Own Device" (BYOD) structure for computer usage, provided the computer meets certain minimum specifications. All students are required to have a computer in order to utilize the online curriculum and various online tools and resources.

HTA also has a computer loan program for students. The laptops vary in manufacturer and style, based on the students' needs, as determined by their grade and course load.
