= Holy Trinity School, Kidderminster =

Holy Trinity School

Location
- Birmingham Road; Kidderminster, Worcestershire, DY10 2BY; England; 52.390327°N 2.238207°W

Information
- Type: Free school
- Established: 1903
- Local authority: Worcestershire
- Department for Education URN: 141105 Tables
- Ofsted: Reports
- Head Teacher: Ian Williams
- Gender: Coeducational
- Age: 4 to 18
- Colours: Navy blue, gold
- Website: http://www.holytrinity.co.uk

Holy Trinity School is a co-educational free school located in Kidderminster, Worcestershire, England, offering education to children from 4 years up to 18 years of age. The school operates under a charitable status, governed by a board of Governors. A free school is a non-selective school that is funded by the taxpayer but is independent of state control. However, it is subject to inspection by Ofsted and is accountable to the Secretary of State for Education.

Children who enter at age 4 are able to continue their school education until it ends at age 18 years. The school has separate Primary, Senior and Sixth Form sections.

The main building is a former Victorian private house known as Elderslie. Founded in 1903 as the Holy Trinity Convent School by a group of Catholic nuns of the Trinitarian Sisters of Valence from France, it became secularised in 1985, and in 1986 it was renamed Holy Trinity School under the ownership of a group of parents who formed the board of trustees. In 2014 Holy Trinity became a free school, and is now state-funded, and free to attend. The Nursery became a separate entity in 2014 and is now known as Little Trinity, providing day care for children from 2 – 5 years.

== Curriculum ==
Subjects taught in the school follow the National Curriculum, and include business, art and design, biology, chemistry, drama, economics, English literature, geography, history, information and communications technology (ICT), law, mathematics, music, modern foreign languages (French), music, physical education (P.E.), physics, and psychology.

== School performance ==
As of 2020, the school's most recent Ofsted inspection was in 2017, when it was judged Good.
