= Holy Trinity Catholic High School =

Holy Trinity Catholic High School or Holy Trinity Catholic Secondary School may refer to:

== Canada ==
- Holy Trinity Catholic High School (Edmonton) in Edmonton, Alberta
- Holy Trinity Catholic High School (Fort McMurray) in Fort McMurray, Alberta
- Holy Trinity Catholic High School (Kanata) in Kanata, Ontario
- Holy Trinity Catholic High School (Simcoe) in Simcoe, Ontario
- Holy Trinity Catholic Secondary School (Cornwall, Ontario) in Cornwall, Ontario
- Holy Trinity Catholic Secondary School (Oakville), in Oakville, Ontario
- Holy Trinity Catholic Secondary School (Courtice), in Courtice, Ontario

== United States ==
- Holy Trinity Catholic High School (Texas) in Temple, Texas
- Holy Trinity Catholic Schools, Fort Madison, Iowa - Includes Holy Trinity Catholic Junior/Senior High School

== See also ==
- Holy Trinity School (disambiguation)
