= Hizb ut-Tahrir America =

American chapter of Hizb ut-Tahrir

Hizb ut-Tahrir America حزب التحرير في أمريكا
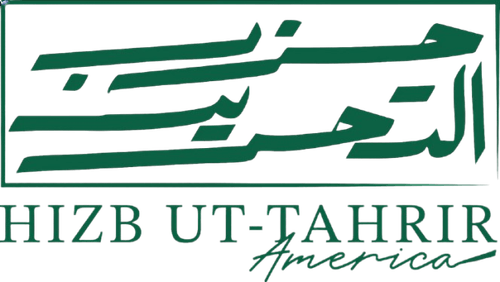
- Abbreviation: HTA
- Founded: c. 1980
- Headquarters: Chicago, Illinois, United States
- Ideology: Pan-Islamism; Islamism; Jihadism; Caliphalism; Antisemitism; Anti-liberalism; Anti-capitalism; Anti-communism
- Political position: Far-right
- Religion: Sunni Islam
- International affiliation: Hizb ut-Tahrir

Flag

Website
- hizb.us

Hizb ut-Tahrir America (HTA; حزب التحرير في أمريكا) is an American political party linked to the international pan-Islamist group Hizb ut-Tahrir, which seeks to establish a global caliphate governed by Sharia law. The group advocates for the unification of Islamic countries and the transformation of secular nations into Islamic states governed by Islamic law.

Although Hizb ut-Tahrir America does not engage in direct political activism within the United States, its global affiliate has been banned in numerous countries due to concerns over its radical ideology and alleged ties to violent extremism. The group has been banned in countries such as Bangladesh, Egypt, Russia, and Turkey due to its perceived promotion of extremism and its calls for the overthrow of secular governments.

== Chapter History ==
Initially, the group struggled to find an identity and, more importantly, recruits. However, the group managed to keep recruitment to levels able to sustain the organization’s existence. While other HT groups around the world have expanded quickly, HTA has taken roughly two decades to establish a concrete presence within the U.S. The group is still wary of outsiders, however, wide use of the internet is now used for recruiting and spreading their message.

Reasons for impotent beginnings are attributed to their founders’ paranoid mentality regarding possible Western “spies” and their suspicion of the internet. This state of mind appeared unnecessary to targeted Muslim recruits who found their paranoia unattractive and strange. However, after the terrorist attacks of September 11, 2001, HTA’s paranoid behavior seemed to justify itself after many Muslims felt unjust scrutiny over the terrorist attacks. HTA suspicion of the internet waned once they realized the large advantage in propagating their message via the World Wide Web. Also, it is thought that new, younger membership helped push the organization in this direction.

While membership has grown, HTA is still very secretive in regards to its activities and membership. Those who attempt to learn more about the group are quickly confronted in an effort to stifle any knowledgeable discovery. If the HTA name is mentioned in the public realm, it must be done on their terms and conditions; those who attempt to highlight their existence are swiftly countered.

Iyad Hilal began HTA activities in California, in the early 1990s. Despite HTA presence in the country for over two decades, the group’s membership size is unknown,

== Ideology ==
The organization officially states: “Hizb ut-Tahrir is a political party whose ideology is Islam, so politics is its work and Islam is its ideology.” This belief is so strong that HT’s global site says, “Muslims in the United States are being dared, duped, and ultimately deceived into adopting voting in the kufr U.S. secular democracy/capitalism by the enemies of Islam…This is a satanic plan where elections are attempts to integrate Muslims.”

In addition to HTA’s anti-Western sentiments, the group is also ardently antisemitic and anti-Israel. One HT leaflet read " one reading: “Jews are a people of slander. They are treacherous people who violate oaths and covenants. They lie and change words from the right places. They take the rights of the people unjustly, and kill the Prophets and the innocent.” According to John Pike of GlobalSecurity.org their final goal is to establish a global caliphate under Shariah law and impose the Islamic way of life worldwide.

== Methodology ==
Pike also believes that fundamental goal of HTA is to "combat infidels" in the effort to establish Dar al-Islam, or the land where the rules of Islam are enforced. HTA’s aim is to incite abhorrence within the Muslim population against other Americans, laying the bedrock for a violent conflict. Madeleine Gruen wrote "A component of HTA's strategy is to instill a sense of alienation among American Muslims so that they will turn away from their country and instead identify themselves as members of the Ummah." This is a, "strategy to isolate American Muslims from the rest of society." To achieve this, HT will use fiery language to arouse Muslim passions:

“You must realize that the United States is an enemy state that works round the clock to subvert the interests of the Islamic Ummah. America is an enemy to the Muslims whether you are in Iraq, Afghanistan, Pakistan or Bangladesh. America is making plans against you as Muslims whether you are part of a political party or not…So raise your voice against the American enemy and the government’s subservience to her. Otherwise your silence only gives strength to America enabling her to execute her plans. If they are not stopped immediately and decisively they will achieve an upper hand from which they can inflict greater harm…You must resist America before it is too late. Before she consolidates her foothold in the country like she has done in Pakistan, Afghanistan and Iraq. And stand with Hizb ut Tahrir and give your support to the party in re-establishing the Khilafah which will rule by the Qur’an and Sunnah, build a strong military and eliminate US and Britain-India’s control over the Muslim Ummah.

HTA rhetoric covers a number of issues. For example, one issue, democracy, is “a satanic plan where elections are attempts to integrate Muslims,” according to the group. A former member recounts, “Hizb ut-Tahrir are not a terrorist organization, but they do believe in using violent force to remove a democratic government. This will not be done through the use of terrorism, rather by infiltrating armies in Muslim-majority countries.”

HTA’s strategy is long-term, intending to achieve success through a patient persistence.

John Pike argues that while the strategy is long-term, the plan is not an inactive, hap-hazard strategy; it consists of three carefully planned steps:

1. The first step encompasses educating a small group of supporters who propagate the tenets of HTA and become the base membership for the next two steps. Cells are established in this period.
2. The base then reaches out to fellow Muslims to educate and expand membership in preparation for the next and final step. Prominent members of government, the military, and other national power structures are a target so as to make the last step thoroughly achievable.
3. The last step is embarked upon once numbers within HTA reach critical mass – a strength capable to readily change the structure of government to an Islamic caliphate.

According to HTA's stated methodology, the organization considers itself to be in the second of its three stages of activity. The group recruits members and has expanded its activities in the years following the September 11 attacks. Zeyno Baran of the Hudson Institute has described Hizb ut-Tahrir as a highly disciplined organization with a centralized structure that does not permit internal dissent.

HTA operates legally within the United States, relying on First Amendment protections of speech, assembly, and religion to promote its ideology. The group frequently addresses Islamophobia in its public messaging; critics have characterized this emphasis as a means of deflecting scrutiny of the organization.

== Recruitment ==
As identified above, HTA is in the second phase of their three step strategy. This phase encompasses increasing membership to a critical mass strength.

Once an individual becomes a member, they undergo an intense two year education process that has often been cited as period constructed to brainwash new inductees. This indoctrination period is secretive and is claimed to only encompass small-group meetings where their beliefs are taught.

HTA also holds a presence on university campuses. HTA will recruit male students who then return to their native country and start an HT cell. The campus also plays an important role for HTA in the recruitment of professionals such as lawyers and doctors. Recruitment of international male students in the U.S. has become an important component of HTA activities. HTA will accept, in the recruitment, males and females of any colour or background.

HTA also orchestrates conferences for the purposes of recruitment and for pushing their anti-American message. Also, HTA promotes their conferences through a well-coordinated social media campaign.

== Ties to terrorism ==
The group has no confirmed links to terrorist groups, but has been banned in many countries on charges of terrorism.
