= Trinitarian Sisters of Valence =

Congregation of the Sisters of the Most Holy Trinity
- Soeurs Trinitaires de Valence
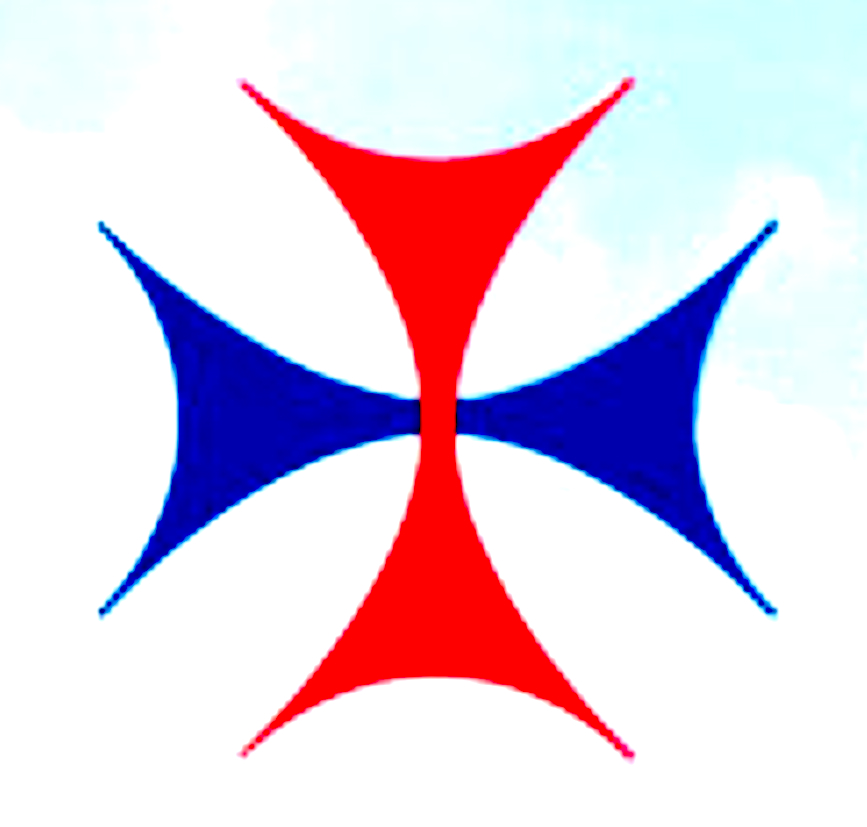
- Emblem of the Congregation of the Most Holy Trinity

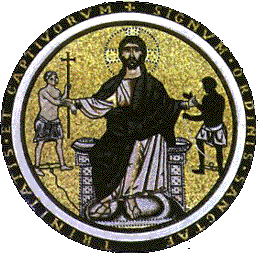
- Abbreviation: C.S.S.T.
- Formation: 1660
- Founder: Four young country women of Saint-Nizier-de-Fornas
- Type: religious congregation (Institute of Consecrated Life)
- Headquarters: 17 Rue Chazière, 69004 Lyon, France.
- Members: 317 (2013)
- Superior General: Mother Lecaillon Benedicte-Marie C.S.S.T.
- Website: www.trinitaires.org

The Congregation Sisters of the Most Holy Trinity, also known as the Trinitarian Sisters of Valence, is a Roman Catholic religious congregation of religious sisters based in Lyon, France, founded in 1660.

== History ==
=== Origins ===
The origins of Congregation Sisters of the Most Holy Trinity are traced to four young country women of Saint-Nizier-de-Forez in the archidiocese of Lyon (France). They had joined the Confraternity of the Most Holy Trinity in 1660 and were zealous to serve God in some special way. Under the direction of their leader, Jeanne Adrian adruab, they formed a community and, in 1675, asked the archbishop of Lyon, Camille de Neuville, to allow them to open a combination of school and hostel where they could instruct unschooled poor girls. The archbishop granted their request on the condition that they not go on to become a religious institute. However, in 1676, encouraged by the archdiocesan vicar general, Monsieur de Morange, the community assumed the name of Filles de la Confrérie Trinitaire along with the rule and habit of the Trinitarian Recollect order of nuns. They combined the education of youth and the care of the sick with an austere regimen of life. They fasted and abstained of the Divine Office at midnight, and five acts of adoration to the Most Holy Trinity and two hours of prayer during the day. Within a few years the community had five houses.

=== The Filles at Valence ===
In 1685, the Filles de Saint-Nizier, as they were commonly called, accepted the management of St. John's Hospital in the city of Valence (Drôme) which became the headquarters of the Congregation. The first superior, Mother Jeanne Adrian, was loved by townspeople and esteemed as a saint when she died in 1688. Life became very hard for the Sisters, especially in 1690, when the wounded in the War of the League of Augsburg crowded their hospital to four times its capacity. In 1695, the third superior general, Mother Marie-Marthe de la Forge, a blood sister of Minister General Gregoire de La Forge, had the congregation redefine its purpose, which was stated to be the glorification of the Most Holy Trinity though a ministry of redemption of people enslaved by sin. In 1727, the Congregation was given legal recognition by King Louis XV, and, ten years later, Bishop Millon of Valance updated their Rule, aligning it with their increased involvement in the hospital and teaching ministries.

The habit of the Trinitarians Sisters of Valence in 1847

=== The Sisters during the French Revolution ===
During the French Revolution, all convents and monasteries were suppressed, but the Sisters of Valence were allowed to stay in their hospitals. The scarcity of lay nurses willing to care for the wounded soldiers made their services indispensable. The Sisters were even allowed to wear the religious habit, which the attending doctors told the revolutionary authorities was necessary to assure respect from the soldiers. At St. John's Hospital in Valence, the chapel was converted into a hospital ward, and the attic of the convent was used as a hiding place for réfractaires priests who, in the dead of night, would say Mass for the Sisters and a few trusted faithful of the area. When some revolutionary guards attempted to arrest the Sisters for refusing to take the oath of fealty to the Revolutionary Government, the townspeople besieged the police station and forced the gendarmes to release them. The sister who tactfully guided the Congregarion during the difficult years of the Revolution was Motehr Blanche-Agnès Dubost. She was superior general from 1790 until her death in 1820.

The pope Pius VI was imprisoned by Napoleon in the fortress of Valence. Eight of the Sisters, and Fr. Girolamo Malachia Fantini (trinitarian father), the pope's personal chaplain, were the only ones allowed to visit and care for the Pontiff.

=== Expansion ===
In the effort to keep the Congregation alive, Mother Blanche-Agnès Dubost succeeded in having the autonomous hospitals of Valence, Montélimar and Crest form a corporation legally recognized by the Consulate (1810). In 1818, the town council decided to remove the patients from the Sisters' hospital in Valence, but gave them the building in recognition of past services. The house became the headquarters and novitiate of the Congregation. A steady growth in membership followed the disruption of the Revolution and occasioned the opening of new convents, schools, hospitals, day clinics, homens for the aged and orphanages throughout France and, from 1840 on, in North Africa. In 1880, one hundred fifty Sisters served in nineteen hospitals, clinics and schools attached to their fifteen convents in Algeria. A series of anticlerical laws issued by the French government that year caused the Sisters to lose seventy schools throughout France and Algeria. This prompted the Sisters to start making foundations outside France. So it was that the Congregation expanded to England (1886), Switzerland (1891), Belgium (1895), Italy (1903), Madagascar (1928), Gabon (1963), USA (1964), Spain (1968), Ireland (1977), South Korea (1985), Colombia (1986), Cameroon (1996), China (1996), and Peru (2007). The Congregation became a pontifical institute in 1891.

In the course of time the following French congregations of Trinitarian sisters merged with the Sisters of Valence:

- The Trinitarian sisters of Lyon, founded in 1711 for the education of children from broken families, these sisters survived with difficulty the suppressions of religious orders by the French Revolution. The reduced membership caused them to merge with the Sisters of Valence in 1848.
- The Trinitarian Sisters of Plancöet, founded in 1860 and merged with the Sisters of Valence in 1871.
- The Trinitarian sisters of Dinard, founded in 1865 for the education of poor girls, these sisters merged with the Sisters of Valence in 1871.
- The Discalced Trinitarian Sisters of Marseille or the Trinitarian Sisters of St. Martha, founded in 1843 and merged with the Sisters of Valence in 1964.

== The Congregation today ==
=== Organization ===
The Trinitarian Sisters of Valence are headed by the Superior General and the congregation's general council; these officers serve six-year terms; the Superior General and the members of the general council are elected by the Chapter General, which meets every six years or upon the death of the Superior General. Each local Trinitarian community is headed by a superior, called a Superior, who is appointed to a three-year term and can be renewed for a second three-year term. The current Superior General of the Trinitarian Sisters of Valence is Mother Lecaillon Benedicte-Marie C.SS.T.

=== Distribution ===
In 2013, the Sisters of Valence numbered about 317 and had 50 houses. They are in Europe: France, England, Ireland, Spain, Belgium, Switzerland and Italy; in Africa: Cameroon, Gabon, Congo, and Madagascar; in America: Canada, Colombia and Peru; in Asia: China, South Korea, Philippines and Vietnam. Their headquarters is at 17 Rue Chazière, 69004 Lyon, France.

== See also ==
- Trinitarian Order
- Holy Trinity College Bromley
- Holy Trinity School, Kidderminster
