= Holy Trinity (Raphael and Perugino) =

Fresco by Pietro Perugino

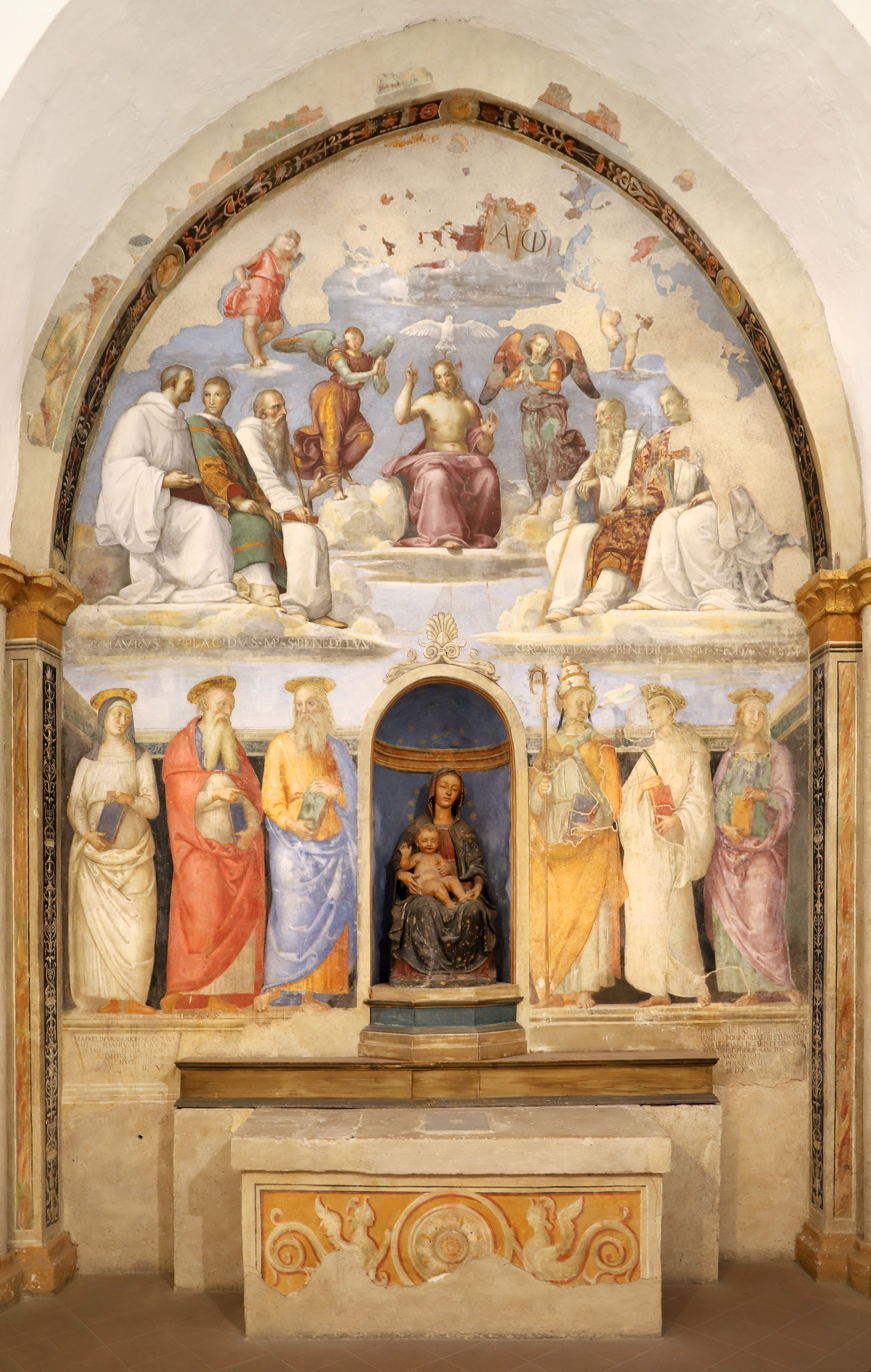
Holy Trinity (c. 1505–1521) by Raphael and Perugino

The Holy Trinity is a fresco executed by Raphael and Perugino, located in San Severo Chapel of San Severo Church in Perugia, Italy.

A commission from bishop Troilo Baglioni, the upper register was painted around 1505 by Raphael, showing the Holy Trinity surrounded by saints and angels. Vasari writes in Lives of the Artists:

...and in San Severo in the same town [Perugia], a small monastery of the Camaldolese order, at the chapel of Our Lady, he [Raphael] completed the fresco of Christ in glory, God the Father with several angels and six seated saints, that is three saints on each side: St Benedict, Romuald [founder of the Camaldolese order], Lawrence, Jerome, Maurice and Placidus; and in this work, which is considered as a very beautiful fresco, he wrote his name in big and very apparent letters...

He had not painted the lower register by the time he left for Rome and so this was added by Raphael's master Perugino in the 1520s. He added saint Scholastica, her brother Benedict of Nursia and John the Apostle to the left of the niche and Gregory the Great, Boniface and Martha to its right.

It is now in a poor state of conservation due to humidity, lack of conservation and damage from previous restorations by Giovanni Battista Cavalcaselle, Carattoli (1835) and Consoni (1871). At the bottom left of the altar is the inscription "RAPHAEL DE VRBINO D. OCTAVI/ANO STEPHANI VOLTERRANO PRIO/RE SANCTAM TRINITATEM ANGE/LOS ASTANTES SANCTOSQVE / PINXIT / A.D. MDV" and at its bottom left is a record of the work's completion in 1521.
