= Trinity Church =

Trinity Church may refer to:

== Antarctica ==
- Trinity Church (Antarctica)

== Australia ==
- Trinity Church Adelaide, South Australia
- Trinity Church, Perth, Western Australia

== Bulgaria ==
- Trinity Church, Bansko

== Canada ==
- Little Trinity Anglican Church
- Trinity Anglican Church (Cambridge, Ontario)
- Trinity Anglican Church (Ottawa)
- Trinity Evangelical Lutheran Church (Toronto)
- Trinity-St. Paul's United Church
- Trinity-St. Stephen's United Church
- Trinity United Church (Peterborough, Ontario)

== China ==
- Trinity Church, Changsha
- Trinity Church, Langzhong

== Denmark ==
- Trinitatis Church (Trinity Church), Copenhagen
- Trinity Church, Esbjerg

== Finland ==
- Holy Trinity Church, Vaasa

== France ==
- Abbey of Sainte-Trinité, Caen
- Sainte-Trinité, Paris

== Georgia ==
- Gergeti Trinity Church

== Germany ==
- Propsteikirche St. Trinitatis, Leipzig
- Trinity Church, Munich
- St. Trinitatis, Wolfenbüttel

== Luxembourg ==
- Trinity Church, Luxembourg

== Norway ==
- Trinity Church (Arendal) (Trefoldighetskirken)
- Trinity Church (Oslo) (Trefoldighetskirken)

== Peru ==
- Trinitarian Church of Lima (Iglesia de las Trinitarias)

== Russia ==
- Trinity Church in Orekhovo-Borisovo, Moscow
- Trinity Church (Novocherkassk), Rostov Oblast

== Slovakia ==
- Trinitarian Church of Bratislava (Trinity Church)

== Sweden ==
- Trinity Church, Halmstad (Trefaldighetskyrkan)
- Trinity Church (Karlskrona) (Trefaldighetskyrkan)
- Trinity Church, Kristianstad

== Ukraine ==
- Gate Church of the Trinity (Pechersk Lavra), Kyiv

== United Kingdom ==
- Trinity Church, Barrow-in-Furness, Cumbria
- Trinity Church (Brentwood), Essex
- Trinity Cheltenham
- Trinity with Palm Grove Church, Claughton, Birkenhead, Merseyside
- Trinity College Kirk, now dismantled Royal Collegiate Church in Edinburgh
- Trinity Presbyterian Church, Wrexham

== United States ==
- Trinity Church (Nevada City), California
- Trinity Church (Oakland, California)
- Trinity Church (Brooklyn, Connecticut)
- Trinity Church (Milton, Connecticut)
- Trinity Church (Thomaston, Connecticut)
- Trinity Church (Elkridge, Maryland)
- Trinity Church (Boston), Massachusetts
- Trinity Baptist Church (Concord, New Hampshire)
- Trinity Church (Cornish, New Hampshire)
- Trinity Church (Holderness, New Hampshire)
- Trinity Church (Asbury Park, New Jersey)
- Trinity Church (Swedesboro, New Jersey)
- Trinity Methodist Church (Beacon, New York)
- Trinity Church (Constantia, New York)
- Trinity Church (Elmira, New York)
- Trinity Communion Church (Irondequoit, New York)
- Trinity Chapel Complex, Manhattan
- Trinity Church (Manhattan)
- Trinity Church Complex (Roslyn, New York)
- Trinity Church (Warsaw, New York)
- Trinity Methodist Church (Elizabethtown, North Carolina)
- Trinity Episcopal Church (Scotland Neck, North Carolina)
- Nast Trinity United Methodist Church, Cincinnati, Ohio
- Old Trinity Church, Philadelphia, Pennsylvania
- Trinity Church (Newport, Rhode Island)
- Trinity Church (Pawtucket, Rhode Island)
- Trinity Church (Edisto Island, South Carolina)
- Trinity Church (Mason, Tennessee)
- Trinity Episcopal Church (Houston), Texas
- Trinity Church (Beaverdam, Virginia)
- Trinity Church (Wenatchee, Washington)

== See also ==
- Church of the Holy Trinity v. United States, a decision of the Supreme Court of the United States
- Church of the Life-Giving Trinity (disambiguation)
- Dreifaltigkeitskirche (disambiguation)
- Holy Trinity Church (disambiguation)
- Trinity Church and Rectory (disambiguation)
- Trinity Episcopal Church (disambiguation)
- Trinity Methodist Church (disambiguation)
- Trinity Methodist Episcopal Church (disambiguation)
