= Trinity Methodist Church =

Trinity Methodist Church may refer to:

== United Kingdom ==
- Trinity Methodist Church, Castleford
- Trinity Methodist Church, Harrogate
- Trinity Methodist Church, Hillsborough
- Trinity Methodist Church, Wood Green

== United States ==
(by state)

- Trinity Methodist Church (Savannah, Georgia)
- Trinity Methodist Church (Idaho Falls, Idaho), listed on the NRHP in Idaho
- Trinity Methodist Church (Beacon, New York), listed on the NRHP in New York
- Trinity Methodist Church (Elizabethtown, North Carolina), listed on the NRHP in North Carolina
- Trinity Methodist Church (Franklin, Tennessee), listed on the NRHP in Tennessee
- Trinity Methodist Church (Richmond, Virginia), listed on the NRHP in Virginia

== See also ==
- Trinity Church (disambiguation)
- Trinity Methodist Episcopal Church (disambiguation)
- Trinity United Methodist Church (disambiguation)
