= Marcussen & Søn =

Danish firm of pipe organ builders

Marcussen & Søn, also known as Marcussen and previously as Marcussen & Reuter, is a Danish firm of pipe organ builders. They were one of the first firms to go back to classical organ-building techniques, and have been producing mechanical-action organs since 1930. Aside from their many instruments in Denmark, they have built organs in northern Germany, Sweden, Finland, the Netherlands, Great Britain, South Africa, Japan, and the United States.

== History ==
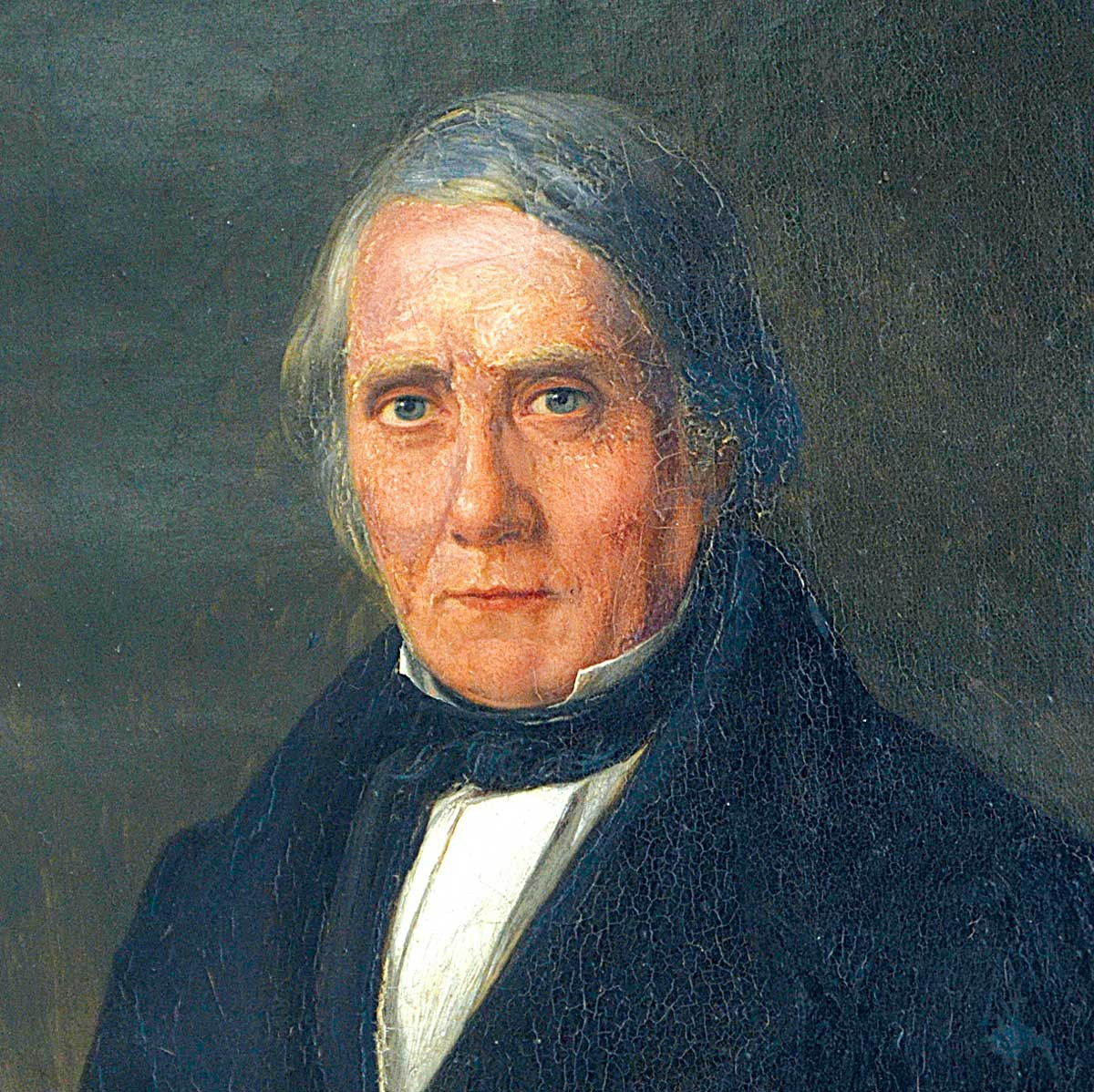
Jürgen Marcussen

Jürgen Marcussen (1781–1860) founded the organ-building company in 1806. They used the name Marcussen & Reuter from 1826 to 1848, when the name became Marcussen & Søn after the founder's son, Jürgen Andreas Marcussen, joined the firm. The company has been based in a house in the small town of Åbenrå, in southern Jutland, since 1830. Several organs built in Scandinavia and North Germany in their first decades are still in use today, the oldest dating from 1820.

Johannes Lassen Zachariassen (1864–1922), a grandson of the founder's daughter, took over the firm from 1902 to 1922. The firm's work was still based at this stage on the Baroque organ-building tradition, but from about 1900, in common with nearly all other organ-builders, they began making use of pneumatics, electricity, and other innovations popular at the time, typified by the organs of Cavaillé-Coll.

This new development did not last long. Following a 1925 organ conference in Hamburg and Lübeck, Marcussen was one of the first builders of the Organ Reform Movement, returning to the sonic, structural, and technical principles of the North-European Baroque organ, employing ultra-low wind pressures and high-pitched, vertical principal choruses characteristic of the instruments of Gottfried Silbermann and Arp Schnitger.

The guiding figure behind the change was Sybrand Zachariassen (1900–1960), who took over management of the firm in 1922 at the age of 21. Within a few decades, Marcussen organs began to gain an international reputation, particularly as fine models of the mechanical organ, which again became the preeminent basis of European organ-building practice in the second half of the twentieth century.

Sybrand Jürgen Zachariassen (born in Flensburg, 22 October 1931) became director in 1960. In 1994/1995 the firm became a family-owned limited company, when Claudia Zachariassen (born 26 May 1969 in Sønderborg, the 7th generation of the Marcussen/Zachariassen family) joined the firm; she became president in 2002.

== Today ==
Marcussen builds pipe organs for churches and concert halls, and restores notable historical organs. Their new organs are based on classical organ-building traditions, with reliable slider windchests, simple mechanical "tracker" action with precise function, and a wide sound spectrum.

Their activity encompasses all the professional organ building skills; they have a drawing office, machine and joiners workshops, workshops for the manufacture of wood and reed pipes, a metal pipe workshop with casting shop, a smith's shop and a staff of voicers. This allows them to manufacture all the component parts in their own workshops according to their own quality standards, from the selection and manufacture of the wood and metal to voicing of the completed organ.

They employ about 60 people and build several organs per year.

== Notable Marcussen organs ==
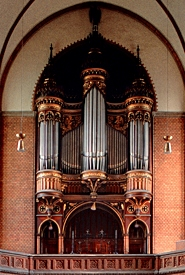
The Marcussen organ in St. Johannis Harvestehude Hamburg

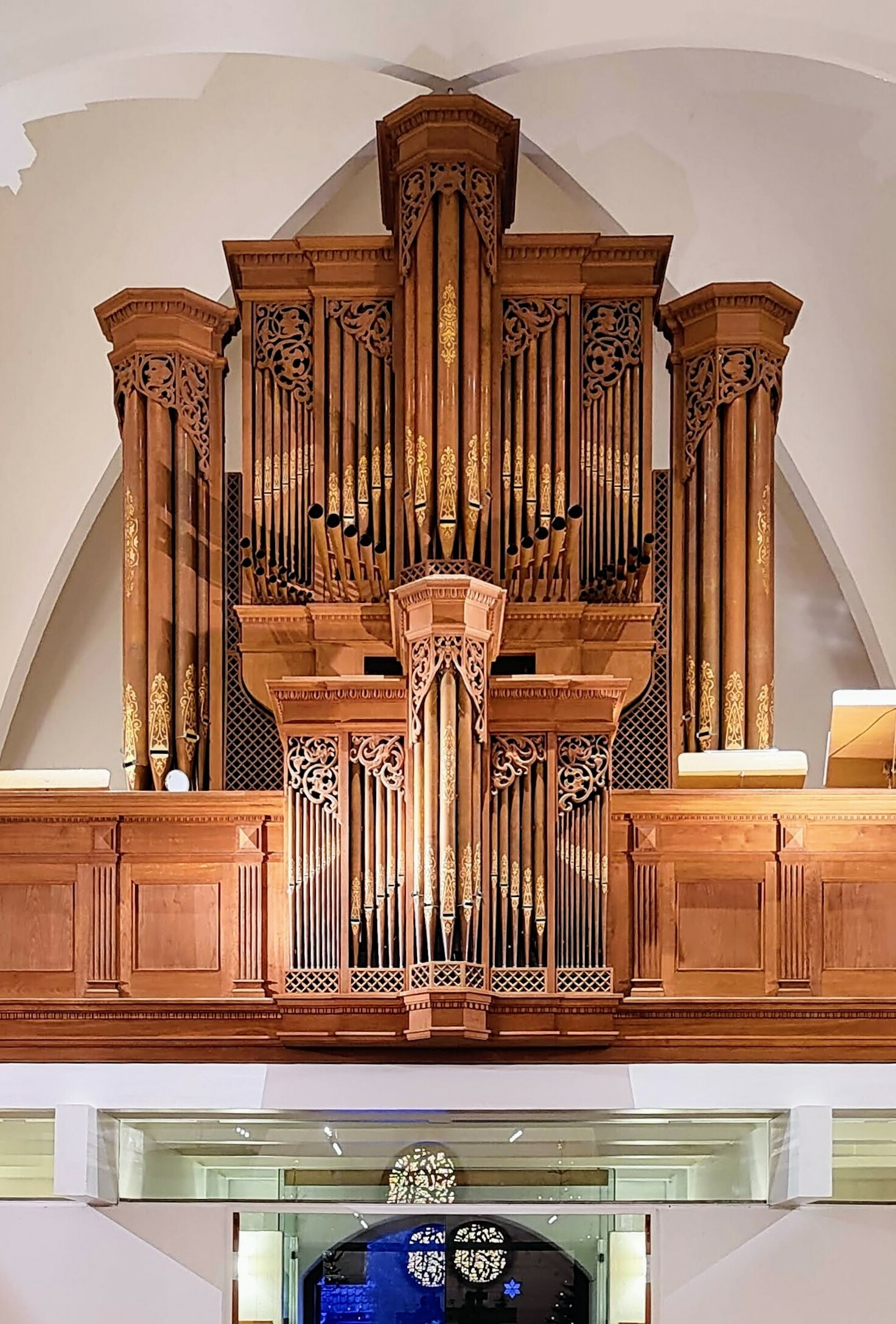
The Marcussen organ in Jægersborg Kirke, Danmark

As of 2015, the total number of organs built by Marcussen was about 1,150.

- Christiansborg Slotskirke, Copenhagen (1829)
- Nikolaikirche, Kiel (1842)
- Saint Canute's Cathedral (Odense Domkirke) (1862)
- St Nikolai Kirkesal, Copenhagen (1930)
- Lund Cathedral (1932–34)
- Jægersborg Kirke (1944)
- Oscar's Church, Stockholm (1949)
- Sibbo Kyrka (1951)
- Saint Nicolai (Aabenraa) (1956)
- Nicolaikerk, Utrecht (1957)
- Finnish Seamen's Mission, Rotherhithe (1958)
- Grundtvigskirken, Copenhagen (1965)
- Viborg Domkirke (1966)
- Kloosterkerk, The Hague, The Netherlands (1966)
- Neuer Dom, Linz (1968)
- Dom, Lübeck (1970)
- Grote or Sint-Laurenskerk, Rotterdam (1973)
- St. Mary's Church, Nottingham (1973)
- St. Mary's Church, Clifton, Nottingham (1974)
- Holy Trinity Church, Vaasa (1975)
- St Jacobs Kyrka, Stockholm (1977)
- St Nicolai Kirke, Kolding (1977)
- Vestervig Kirke (1978)
- Endler Hall, University of Stellenbosch (1980)
- Nieuwe Kerk, Amsterdam (1981)
- St. Mary the Virgin, Putney Bridge (1981)
- Wichita State University (1986)
- Raphaëlis orglet, Roskilde Domkirke (1991)
- First Presbyterian Church of Moorestown, Moorestown, NJ USA (1991)
- Vor Frue Kirke, Copenhagen (1995)
- Tonbridge School Chapel, Kent (1995)
- Bridgewater Hall, Manchester (1996)
- Vestjysk Musikkonservatorium Esbjerg (2002)

=== Restorations ===
- Sint-Bavokerk, Haarlem
- Nieuwe Kerk, Amsterdam
- Roskilde Cathedral
- Helsingør Sct. Mariæ Church (where Diderich Buxtehude was organist 1660–1668)

== Sources ==
- Hans Klotz, Ole Olesen: "Marcussen", Grove Music Online, ed. L. Macy (Accessed 2007-06-25)
