= Trinity Episcopal Church =

Trinity Episcopal Church may refer to various buildings and their congregations in the United States:

== Alabama ==
- Trinity Episcopal Church (Mobile, Alabama), 1845, the first large Gothic Revival church built in Alabama

== Arkansas ==
- Trinity Episcopal Church (Pine Bluff, Arkansas), 1866, also known as St. John's Parish
- Trinity Episcopal Church (Searcy, Arkansas), 1902

== California ==
- Trinity Episcopal Church (Santa Barbara, California), 1866

== Delaware ==
- Trinity Episcopal Church (Wilmington, Delaware), 1890

== District of Columbia ==
- Trinity Episcopal Church (Washington, D.C.), 1851, razed in 1936

== Florida ==
- Trinity Episcopal Church (Apalachicola, Florida), 1839, originally known as Christ Church
- Trinity Episcopal Church (Melrose, Florida), 1886, an historic Carpenter Gothic Episcopal church
- Trinity Parish (St. Augustine, Florida), 1834, the oldest Protestant church in Florida

== Georgia ==
- Trinity Episcopal Church (Columbus, Georgia), 1891

== Idaho ==
- Trinity Episcopal Church (Gooding, Idaho), 1907, on the National Register of Historic Places listings in Idaho
- Trinity Episcopal Church (Pocatello, Idaho), 1987

== Illinois ==
- Trinity Episcopal Church (Wheaton, Illinois), 1881, a historical Gothic Revival Episcopal church

== Indiana ==
- Trinity Episcopal Church (Bloomington, Indiana), 1905, a church in the Episcopal Diocese of Indianapolis
- Trinity Episcopal Church (Connersville, Indiana), 1859, deconsecrated 2017
- Trinity Episcopal Church (Fort Wayne, Indiana), 1865

== Iowa ==
- Trinity Episcopal Church (Iowa City, Iowa), 1871
- Trinity Episcopal Church (Muscatine, Iowa), 1854
- Trinity Episcopal Church (Ottumwa, Iowa), 1985, in the Fifth Street Bluff Historic District

== Kansas ==
- Trinity Episcopal Church (Atchison, Kansas), 1866

== Kentucky ==
- Trinity Episcopal Church (Covington, Kentucky), 1857
- Trinity Episcopal Church (Danville, Kentucky), 1830
- Trinity Episcopal Church (Owensboro, Kentucky)

== Louisiana ==
- Trinity Episcopal Church (Cheyneyville, Louisiana), 1860

== Massachusetts ==
- Trinity Episcopal Church (Lenox, Massachusetts), 1888
- Trinity Episcopal Church (Melrose, Massachusetts), 1886

== Maine ==
- Trinity Episcopal Church (Lewiston, Maine), 1879

== Michigan ==
- Trinity Episcopal Church (Caro, Michigan), 1881
- Trinity Episcopal Church (Detroit), 1890
- Trinity Episcopal Church (Houghton, Michigan), 1910

== Minnesota ==
- Trinity Episcopal Church (Litchfield, Minnesota), 1871
- Trinity Episcopal Church (St. Charles, Minnesota), 1874
- Trinity Episcopal Church (Stockton, Minnesota), 1859

== Mississippi ==
- Trinity Episcopal Church (Hattiesburg, Mississippi), 1912
- Trinity Episcopal Church (Natchez, Mississippi), 1822

== Missouri ==
- Trinity Episcopal Church (Independence, Missouri), 1881
- Trinity Episcopal Church (Kirksville, Missouri), 1917
- Trinity Episcopal Church (St. Louis, Missouri), 1885, moved 1910

== New Jersey ==
- Trinity Episcopal Church (Asbury Park, New Jersey)
- Trinity Episcopal Church (Woodbridge, New Jersey), c. 1717

== New York ==
- Trinity Episcopal Church (Ashland, New York), 1879
- Trinity Episcopal Church (Buffalo, New York), 1886
- Trinity Episcopal Church (Claverack, New York), 1901
- Trinity Episcopal Church-Fairfield, Fairfield, New York, 1808
- Trinity Church (Manhattan), 1839-46, on Broadway near Wall Street, also known as Trinity Episcopal Church
- Trinity Episcopal Church Complex (Mount Vernon, New York), 1857
- Trinity Episcopal Church (Potsdam, New York), 1835
- Trinity Episcopal Church Complex (Saugerties, New York), 1831
- Trinity Episcopal Church (Syracuse, New York), 1914, now known as the Faith by Love Church
- Trinity Episcopal Church and Parish House (Watertown, New York), 1889

== North Carolina ==
- Trinity Episcopal Church (Chocowinity, North Carolina), 1826
- Trinity Episcopal Church (Mount Airy, North Carolina), 1896
- Trinity Episcopal Church (Scotland Neck, North Carolina), 1855

== Ohio ==
- Trinity Episcopal Church (Columbus, Ohio), 1866
- Trinity Episcopal Church (McArthur, Ohio), 1882
- Trinity Episcopal Church (Toledo, Ohio), 1863

== Oregon ==
- Trinity Episcopal Church (Ashland, Oregon), 1894
- Trinity Episcopal Cathedral (Portland, Oregon), 1906
- Trinity Episcopal Church (Bend, Oregon), 1929

== Pennsylvania ==
- Old Trinity Church (Episcopal), 1711, in what was Oxford Township, now Philadelphia, Pennsylvania
- Trinity Episcopal Church (Williamsport, Pennsylvania),1875

== Rhode Island ==
- Trinity Church (Newport, Rhode Island), 1726

== South Carolina ==
- Trinity Episcopal Church and Cemetery, Abbeville, South Carolina, 1860
- Trinity Church (Edisto Island, South Carolina), 1876, formerly Trinity Episcopal Church
- Trinity Episcopal Cathedral (Columbia, South Carolina), 1847, formerly Trinity Episcopal Church

== South Dakota ==
- Trinity Episcopal Church (Groton, South Dakota), 1884

== Tennessee ==
- Trinity Episcopal Church (Clarksville, Tennessee), 1875
- Trinity Episcopal Church (Winchester, Tennessee), 1872

== Texas ==
- Trinity Episcopal Church (Houston), 1919

== Virginia ==
- Trinity Episcopal Church (Portsmouth, Virginia), 1830
- Trinity Episcopal Church (Staunton, Virginia), 1855
- Trinity Episcopal Church (Upperville, Virginia), 1951

== Washington ==
- Trinity Parish Episcopal Church (Seattle), 1902

== West Virginia ==
- Trinity Episcopal Church (Huntington, West Virginia), 1882
- Trinity Episcopal Church (Parkersburg, West Virginia), 1878

== Wisconsin ==
- Trinity Episcopal Church (Oshkosh, Wisconsin), 1887

== See also ==
- Trinity Church (disambiguation)
- Trinity Episcopal Cathedral (disambiguation)
- Trinity Memorial Episcopal Church (disambiguation)
- Trinity Methodist Church (disambiguation)
- Trinity Methodist Episcopal Church (disambiguation)
- Trinity Protestant Episcopal Church (disambiguation)
