= Dreifaltigkeitskirche =

Dreifaltigkeitskirche (German for Trinity Church) may refer to:

== Austria ==
- Church of the Holy Trinity, Salzburg in Salzburg

== Australia ==
- Lutheran Trinity Church, East Melbourne, a German-language church known as Deutsche Evangelische Dreifaltigkeitskirche

== Germany ==
- Holy Trinity Church, Bad Berneck
- Dreifaltigkeitskirche (Berlin)
- Dresden Cathedral, or the Cathedral of the Holy Trinity, previously the Catholic Church of the Royal Court of Saxony
- Trinitatiskirche (Dresden), in ruins
- Dreifaltigkeitskirche (Munich)
- Dreifaltigkeitskirche (Speyer)

== Switzerland ==
- Dreifaltigkeitskirche, Bern, from 1899

== See also ==
- Holy Trinity Church (disambiguation)
- Trinity Church (disambiguation)
