= Trinity Anglican Church =

Trinity Anglican Church may refer to:

- Trinity Anglican Church (Connersville, Indiana)
- Trinity Anglican Church (Cambridge, Ontario)
- Trinity Anglican Church (Ottawa)
