= Treenighedskirkens Drengekor =

Treenighedskirkens Drengekor (Trinity Church's Boys Choir) is a Danish boys choir founded in Trinity Church, Esbjerg in 1964. The choir has performed widely in Denmark, the rest of Europe and in North America.

== History ==
Per Günther, the church organist, founded the choir in 1964 and led it until he retired in 1969. Since then, it has been supported by Esbjerg Municipality and Esbjerg's Academy of Music and Dramatic Arts in collaboration with the church. Today it consists of 50 singers, boys starting at the age of 8 or 9. The choir gives performances of classical church music both at home and abroad. Venues have included St Peters, Rome, Notre-Dame de Paris and Westminster Abbey. Their tour to the United States in 2013 included concerts in New York, New Haven and Boston. Their concerts have also been widely broadcast on radio and television, not only in Denmark but in Europe and North America. The choir has also made numerous recordings.

== Conductor ==
Since 1990, the choir has been directed by Lone Gislinge (born 1958), a graduate of Esbjerg's Academy of Music and Dramatic Arts. Her repertoire with the choir has included Carl Nielsen's Hymnus Amoris, Vivaldi's Gloria, Dvořák's Mass in D major, and Rutter's Mass of the Children. Gislinge is also the founder and leader of the Esbjerg's girls choir Konservatoriets Pigekor.

== Literature ==
- Günther, Per; Menighedsrådet, Treenigheds Sogn. (2011). Ikke kun om søndagen: Treenighedskirken Esbjerg 1961-2011 (in Danish). Menighedsrådet ved Treenighedskirken, Esbjerg. ISBN 978-87-87036-60-3.
