= Church of the Life-Giving Trinity =

Church of the Life-Giving Trinity may refer to:

- Church of the Life-Giving Trinity (Bataysk)
- Church of the Life-Giving Trinity (Kamensk-Shakhtinsky)
- Church of the Life-Giving Trinity (Pyongyang)
- Church of the Life-Giving Trinity (Volchensky)
