= Trinity Episcopal Cathedral =

Trinity Episcopal Cathedral may refer to:

- Trinity Episcopal Cathedral (Little Rock, Arkansas), listed on the National Register of Historic Places (NRHP)
- Trinity Episcopal Cathedral (Sacramento, California)
- Trinity Episcopal Cathedral (San Jose, California)
- Trinity Episcopal Cathedral (Miami), Florida
- Trinity Episcopal Cathedral (Davenport, Iowa), NRHP-listed
- Trinity Episcopal Cathedral (Reno, Nevada)
- Trinity Episcopal Cathedral (Trenton, New Jersey)
- Trinity Episcopal Cathedral (Portland, Oregon)
- Trinity Cathedral (Pittsburgh), Pennsylvania
- Trinity Episcopal Cathedral (Columbia, South Carolina)

== See also ==
- Holy Trinity Cathedral (disambiguation), including Trinity Cathedral
- Trinity Episcopal Church (disambiguation)
