= Trinity Church and Rectory =

Trinity Church and Rectory may refer to:

Canada

- Trinity Church and Rectory (Kingston, New Brunswick), a National Historic Site of Canada

United States

- Trinity Church and Rectory (Clarksville, Tennessee), listed on the U.S. National Register of Historic Places
- Church of the Holy Trinity and Rectory (Middletown, Connecticut), listed on the U.S. National Register of Historic Places
- Trinity Methodist Episcopal Church and Rectory (Poughkeepsie, New York), listed on the U.S. National Register of Historic Places

== See also ==
- Trinity Church (disambiguation)
