= Absalom Shade =

Canadian politician

- Born: c. 1793; Wyoming County, Pennsylvania, United States
- Died: 15 March 1862; Galt, Canada West
- Burial place: Trinity Anglican Cemetery, Cambridge, Ontario
- Occupation: Businessman
- Known for: Founder of Shade's Mills, early pioneer in Dumfries Township
- Spouses: Catherine Kimball (m. 1823; died 1833) Isabella Jemima Davidson (m. 1837)
- Father: Johann Sebastian Shade

Absalom Shade (c. 1793 – March 15, 1862) was a businessman and political figure in Upper Canada.

He was born in Wyoming County, Pennsylvania around 1793 and worked as a carpenter in Buffalo, New York. In 1816, he was hired by William Dickson to manage his lands in Dumfries Township in Upper Canada. Shade operated a general store, a mill and a distillery in the area. The settlement that developed on the Grand River, originally known as Shade's Mills and later became Galt (now part of Cambridge, Ontario). In 1819, he built a small bridge over the Grand River to serve customers on the other side; it lasted until 1932. Shade also secured a number of contracts to supply food and build roads for the Canada Company. He helped establish the Grand River Navigation Company to help transport goods along the river. He helped establish the Gore Bank in Hamilton and also helped develop railroads in the area. He also helped to build Galt's Trinity Anglican Church in 1844 which still stands, and is in use, today.

He helped establish the Grand River Navigation Company to help transport goods along the river and the Gore Bank in Hamilton. Shade also helped develop railroads in the area and was among those who funded the building of Trinity House Rectory in Galt as a major donor; he and William Dickson were also major donors toward the building of Trinity Anglican Church in 1844.

In 1831, he was elected to the Legislative Assembly of Upper Canada representing Halton; he served until 1841.

Shade died at Galt in 1862.
