= Trinity Protestant Episcopal Church =

Trinity Protestant Episcopal Church may refer to:

- Trinity Protestant Episcopal Church (Galveston, Texas), listed on the National Register of Historic Places in Galveston County, Texas
- Trinity Protestant Episcopal Church (Parkersburg, West Virginia), listed on the National Register of Historic Places in Wood County, West Virginia

== See also ==
- Trinity Episcopal Church (disambiguation)
