= Trinity Church (Cornish, New Hampshire) =

Historic church in New Hampshire, United States

- U.S. National Register of Historic Places
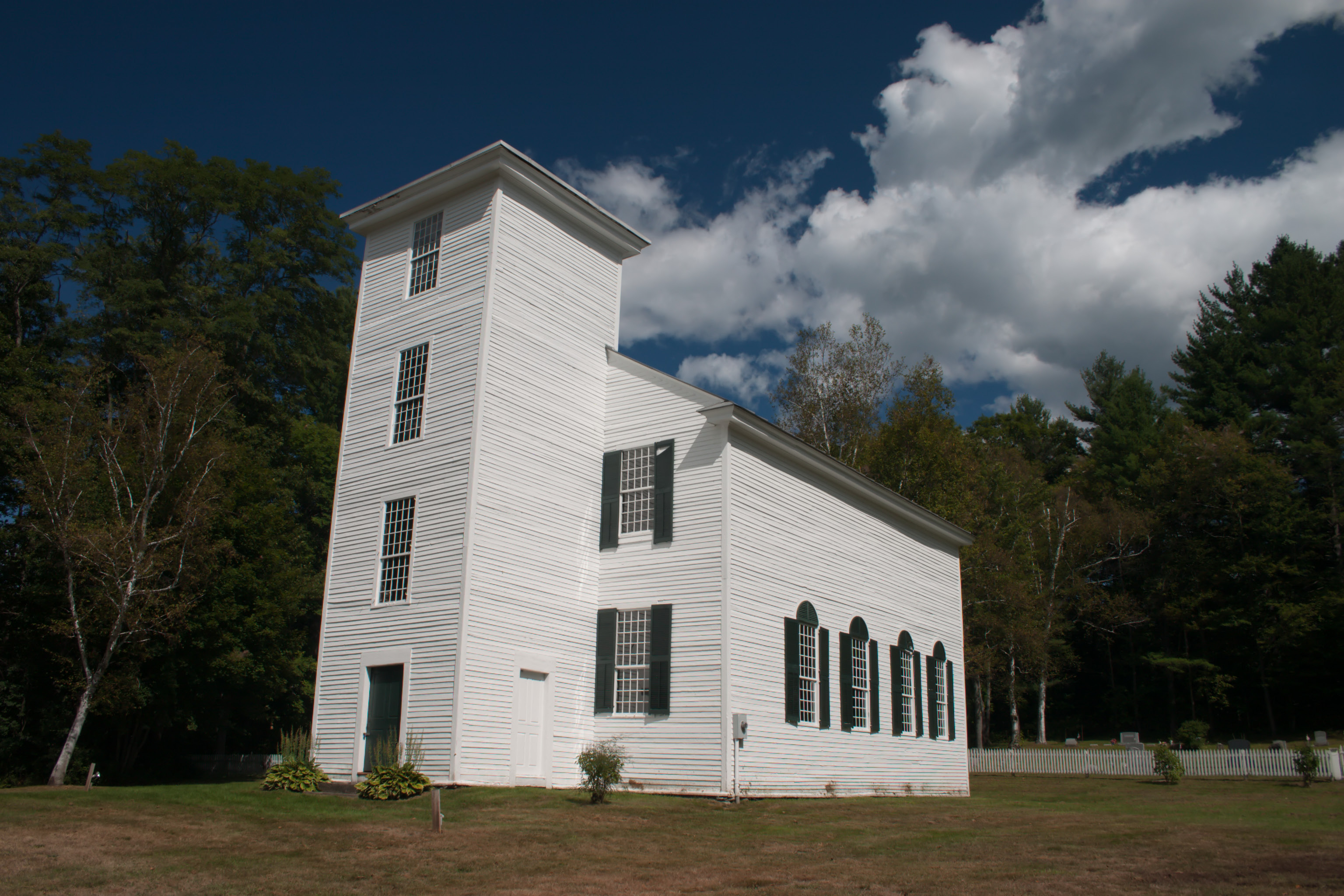

- Location within New Hampshire Location within the United States
- Location: 833 Route 12A; Cornish, New Hampshire
- Coordinates: 43°28′00″N 72°23′06″W
- Area: 1 acre (0.40 ha)
- Built: 1803-1808
- Architect: Philip Tabor
- NRHP reference No.: 78000419
- Added to NRHP: July 31, 1978

Trinity Church is an historic church located at 833 Route 12A in Cornish, New Hampshire, in the United States. It began in 1793 as the Episcopal Society and became Trinity Episcopal Church in 1795. Instrumental in its establishment was Philander Chase, son of one of the three founders of Cornish and then a student at Dartmouth College. Chase later became the first bishop of the Episcopal Diocese of Ohio, the first bishop of the Episcopal Diocese of Illinois, and Presiding Bishop of the Episcopal Church in the United States of America. Construction of the church began in 1803 and was finished in 1808. On February 1, 1980, it was added to the National Register of Historic Places. Its historic graveyard is known as Trinity Cemetery. After decades of being vacant, the church was reopened in 2004 as Trinity Anglican Church.

== Early history ==
It began in 1793 as the Episcopal Society and became Trinity Episcopal Church in 1795. Construction of the church began in 1803 and was finished in 1808. Originally part of what is now the Episcopal Diocese of Massachusetts, it became part of newly formed Episcopal Diocese of New Hampshire in 1811.

== Recent history ==
After being listed on the National Register in 1980, Trinity Church was reconstructed in 1984-1985 by state representative Peter Hoe Burling. In 2004, conman and later convicted murderer Clark Rockefeller bought the vacant building. Afterwards, the church reopened as Trinity Anglican Church.

== See also ==
- National Register of Historic Places listings in Sullivan County, New Hampshire
- Trinity Church (disambiguation)
