= Trinity Church, Esbjerg =

Coordinates: 55°28′40″N 8°26′32″E

Trinity Church
- Treenighedskirken
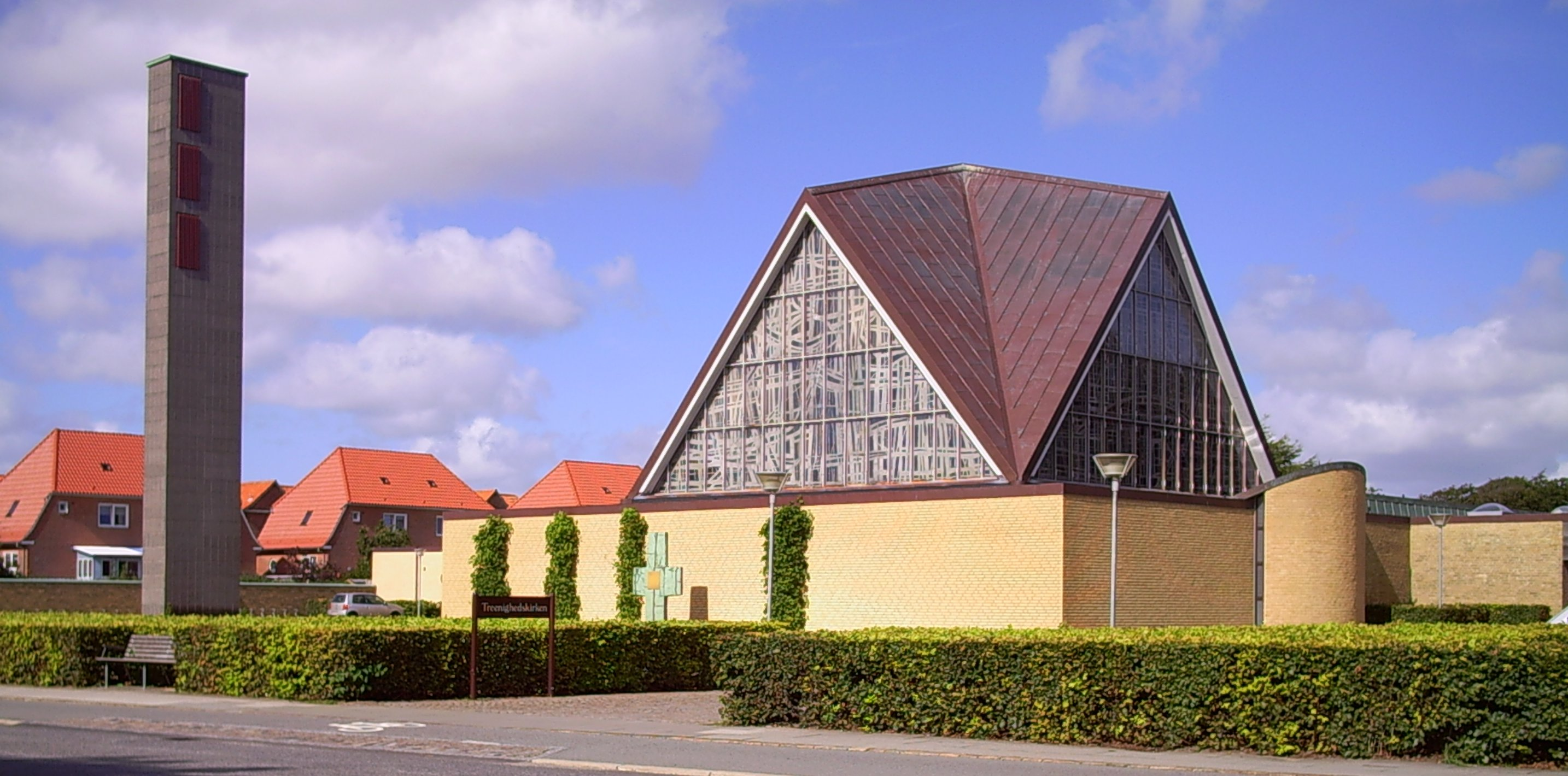
- Trinity Church
- Location: Esbjerg, Denmark
- Denomination: Church of Denmark
- Website: https://www.treenighedskirken.dk/

Architecture
- Architect(s): Erik Flagstad Rasmussen, Knud Thomsen
- Years built: 1959–1961

Administration
- Diocese: Diocese of Ribe
- Deanery: Skads Provsti
- Parish: Treenigheds Sogn

Trinity Church (Danish: Treenighedskirken) is a modern church in Esbjerg in the southwest of Jutland, Denmark. Designed by local architects Erik Flagstad Rasmussen and Knud Thomsen, the yellow-brick building with large triangular stained-glass windows was completed in 1961.

== Background ==
Esbjerg is a city with several new churches, most of which were established after the Second World War when there was a marked increase in the population. Designed to accommodate a large congregation while offering additional facilities for both young and old, Trinity Church was the first of many. Breaking with tradition, its square-shaped nave was built directly adjacent to lower ancillary buildings including a hall with a stage, meeting rooms and a kitchen. The bell tower stands alone, quite separate from the church.

== Architecture ==
In the late 1950s, Erik Flagstad Rasmussen and Knud Thomsen won the competition which had been specifically directed to attract responses from the city's architects. The church itself is a square-shaped building of yellow brick crowned with a low octagonal spire. There are four triangular gables of glass and concrete, all with pointed tops. Completed in 1967, the stained-glass gable windows were designed by Jens Urup Jensen with themes representing Christmas (north) with a red Star of Bethlehem, Easter (east, above the altar) with a cross, Whitsun (south) with 12 red tongues symbolising the Apostles and a blue-toned Water of Life frame (west) above the organ gallery. The colouring of the north and south windows is rather cool while the designs to the east and west are much warmer.

In 1993, an apse was added. In 1999, the church was seriously damaged by a hurricane which dislodged sections of the copper roof. They were used to make a cross, designed by Erik Heide which stands outside next to the south wall.

== Interior ==
The walls inside are of plain brick, the flooring of Øland tiles. A simple oak cross hangs above the altar. The font is also of oak while the pulpit is built of concrete with Christ's monogram.

== Male choir ==
Treenighedskirkens Drengekor (Trinity Church's Boys Choir) was founded by organist Per Günther in 1964 who led the choir until he retired 1989. Thereafter, it has been supported by Esbjerg Municipality and the Esbjerg's Academy of Music and Dramatic Arts in collaboration with the church. Today it consists of 50 singers, boys starting at the age of 8 or 9. They give performances of classical church music both at home and abroad. Venues have included St Peters, Rome, Notre Dame de Paris and Westminster Abbey. Their concerts have also been widely broadcast on radio and television, not only in Denmark but in Europe and North America. The choir has also made numerous recordings.

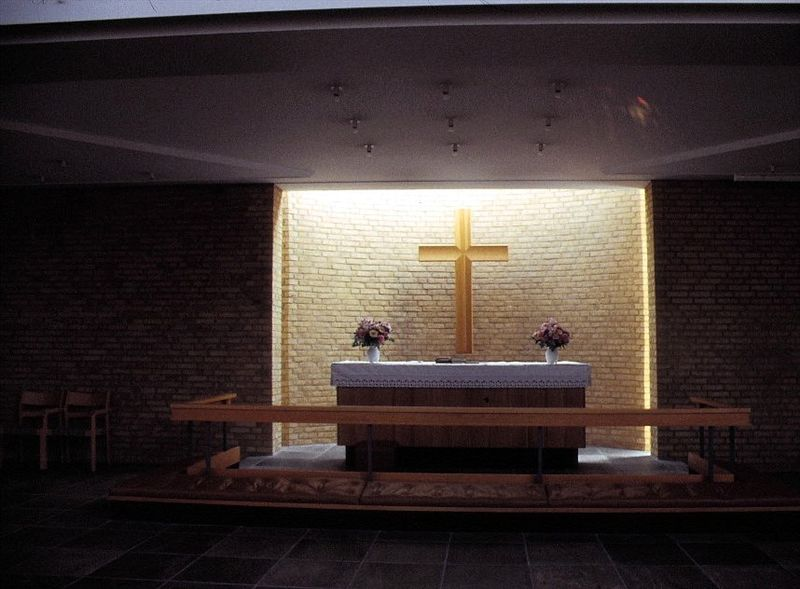
Altar

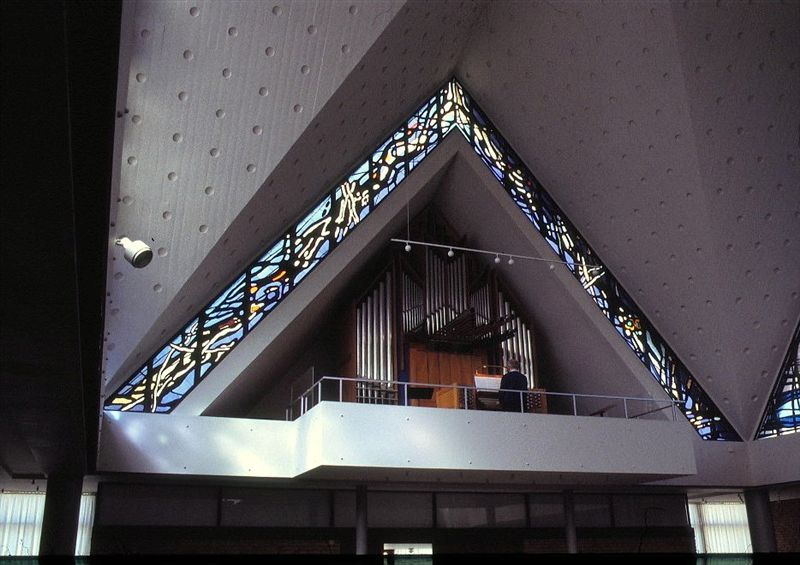
Organ loft

== Literature ==
- Günther, Per; Menighedsrådet, Treenigheds Sogn. (2011). Ikke kun om søndagen: Treenighedskirken Esbjerg 1961-2011 (in Danish). Menighedsrådet ved Treenighedskirken, Esbjerg. ISBN 978-87-87036-60-3.
