= Milton Center Historic District =

Historic district in Connecticut, United States

- U.S. National Register of Historic Places
- U.S. Historic district
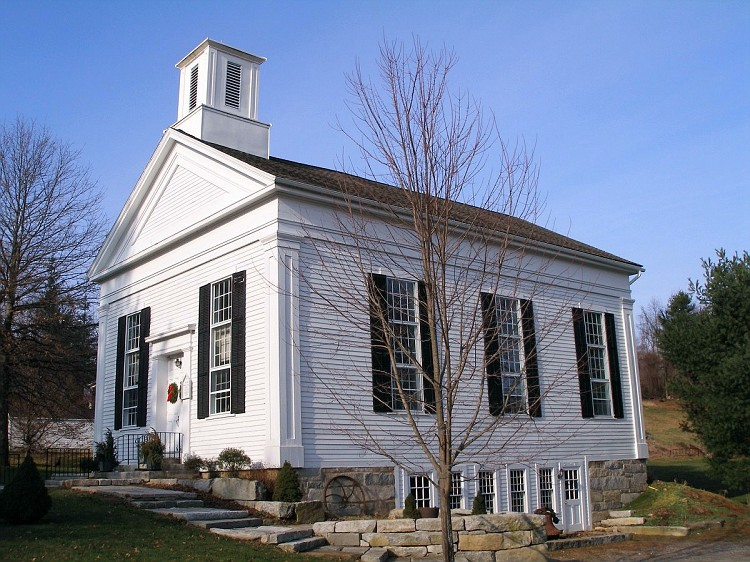
- Milton Congregational Church

- Location within Connecticut Location within the United States
- Location: Roughly bounded by Milton, Shearshop, Headquarters, Sawmill, and Blue Swamp Roads Milton, Connecticut
- Coordinates: 41°46′3″N 73°16′22″W
- Area: 180 acres (73 ha)
- Built: 1750
- Architect: Dickinson, Oliver; Et al.
- Architectural style: Greek Revival
- NRHP reference No.: 86003754
- Added to NRHP: December 23, 1986

The Milton Center Historic District encompasses the historic 19th-century village center of Milton in the northwestern part of the town of Litchfield, Connecticut, United States. Basically linear, it stretches from Milton Cemetery in the west to the junction of Milton and Shearshop Roads in the east, including houses, churches, schools, and the remains of industrial sites. The district was listed on the National Register of Historic Places in 1986.

== Description and history ==
The village of Milton was settled around 1740, and was first known as West Farms. David Welch, one of the early arrivals, built a house in about 1756 that still stands near the eastern end of the village. He was a merchant who also processed iron on his property. Other early residents dammed the branches of the Shepaug River to operate sawmills, gristmills, and other water-powered industry. The small settlement was formally granted parish status by the town in 1768, and its first church was built in 1791. The village flourished until the mid-19th century, after which it declined, bypassed by the railroads and technological advances reducing dependence on water power.

The historic district is basically linear, extending east-west along Milton Road, from the cemetery in the west to the junction of Shearshop Road in the east. The focal point is at this eastern junction, where there is a triangular green and the Trinity Church. The 1791 Congregational Church is a short way to the west. Other notable buildings in the district include the Milton Academy and a Milton District School. Two bridges cross over the East branch of the Shepaug River, and there are archaeological remnants of the water-powered industries. The district is embedded in a larger locally designated district that encompasses 150 buildings.

== Notable person ==
- Amy Archer-Gilligan, serial killer

== See also ==
- National Register of Historic Places listings in Litchfield County, Connecticut
