= Trinity United Methodist Church =

Trinity United Methodist Church may refer to:

Alphabetical by state, then town

- Trinity United Methodist Church (Denver, Colorado), listed on the National Register of Historic Places (NRHP)
- Trinity United Methodist Church (Evansville, Indiana), listed on the NRHP
- Trinity United Methodist Church (Lafayette, Indiana), a contributing structure to the NRHP-listed Centennial Neighborhood District
- Trinity United Methodist Church (Highland Park, Michigan), listed on the NRHP
- Trinity United Methodist Church (Durham, North Carolina)
- Trinity United Methodist Church (Athens, Tennessee), listed on the NRHP
- Trinity Methodist Church (Franklin, Tennessee), listed on the NRHP
- Trinity United Methodist Church (Nutbush, Tennessee)
- Trinity United Methodist Church (Ellett, Virginia), listed on the NRHP
