= David Welch House =

Historic house in Connecticut, United States

- U.S. National Register of Historic Places
- U.S. Historic district – Contributing property
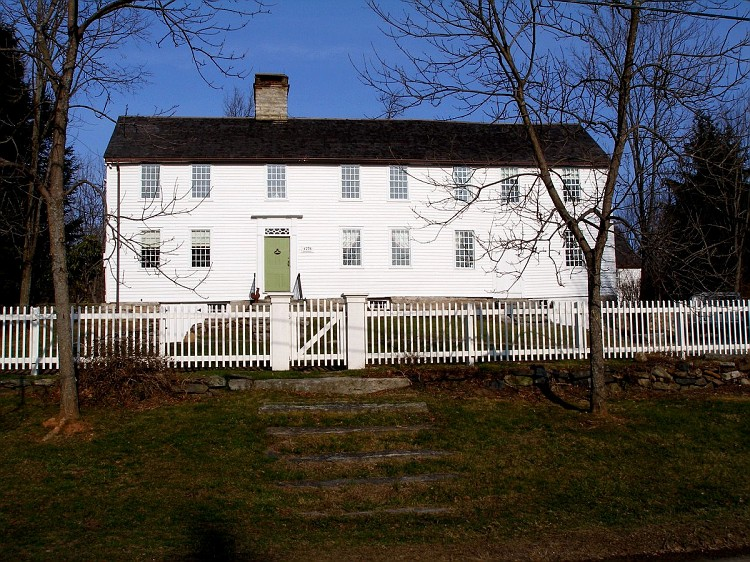

- Location within Connecticut Location within the United States
- Location: Potash and Milton Roads, Milton, Connecticut
- Coordinates: 41°46′13″N 73°15′59″W
- Area: 4.7 acres (1.9 ha)
- Built: 1756
- Built by: Marsh, John, Jr.
- Architectural style: Colonial
- Part of: Milton Center Historic District (ID86003754)
- NRHP reference No.: 84001103

Significant dates
- Added to NRHP: February 16, 1984
- Designated CP: December 23, 1986

The David Welch House is a historic house at Potash and Milton Roads in Milton village of Litchfield, Connecticut. Built in 1756 by one of the first colonial settlers of the area, it is one of the village's oldest buildings. It was listed on the National Register of Historic Places in 1984.

== Description and history ==
The David Welch House stands near the easternmost end of the village of Milton, on the North Side of the Junction of Milton and Potash Roads. It is a 2 1/2-story wood-frame structure, with a gabled roof and clapboarded exterior. Many of the clapboards and windows in the building are original. The house is eight bays wide, consisting of an original five-bay section and a later three-bay addition to the right, and has a saltbox profile with an integral leanto to the rear. Both the main section and the addition have entrances at their respective centers. That of the main house is elaborate, with sidelight windows, pilasters, transom window, and entablature. A large brick chimney rises at the center behind that entrance. The interior retains many original 18th-century features, including wainscoting on the walls and paneled fireplace surrounds.

The house was built in 1756 by John Marsh Jr., one of the early proprietors of Litchfield, for his daughter Irene and son-in-law David Welch. Local lore has it that Irene dubbed the village "Milton" that arose after the mills that lined the branches of the Shepaug River that flowed nearby. Welch owned and operated several iron foundries in the area, and was a prominent figure in local politics, serving in the state legislature. Both Welch and his son John were active participants in the American Revolutionary War. The three-bay addition was built before the war, from which the Welches ran a store. The house remained in the Welch family until 1860.

== See also ==
- National Register of Historic Places listings in Litchfield County, Connecticut
