= Trinity Memorial Episcopal Church =

Trinity Memorial Episcopal Church may refer to:

- Trinity Memorial Episcopal Church (Mapleton, Iowa)
- Trinity Memorial Episcopal Church (Crete, Nebraska), a National Register of Historic Places listing in Saline County, Nebraska

== See also ==
- Trinity Episcopal Church (disambiguation)
