= Trinity Methodist Episcopal Church =

Trinity Methodist Episcopal Church may refer to:

- Trinity Methodist Episcopal Church (New Britain, Connecticut)
- Trinity Methodist Episcopal Church (Bridgeville, Delaware)
- Trinity Methodist Episcopal Church (Augusta, Georgia)
- Trinity United Methodist Church (Des Moines, Iowa), formerly Trinity Methodist Episcopal Church
- Trinity Methodist Episcopal Church and Rectory (Poughkeepsie, New York)
- Trinity Methodist Episcopal Church (Orangeburg, South Carolina)
- Trinity Methodist Episcopal Church (Chattanooga, Tennessee)
- Trinity Methodist Episcopal Church (Knoxville, Tennessee)
- Trinity Methodist Episcopal Church, a church in the Carolina Heights Historic District of Wilmington, North Carolina

== See also ==
- Trinity Church (disambiguation)
- Trinity Episcopal Church (disambiguation)
- Trinity Methodist Church (disambiguation)
