= Carl Axel Setterberg =

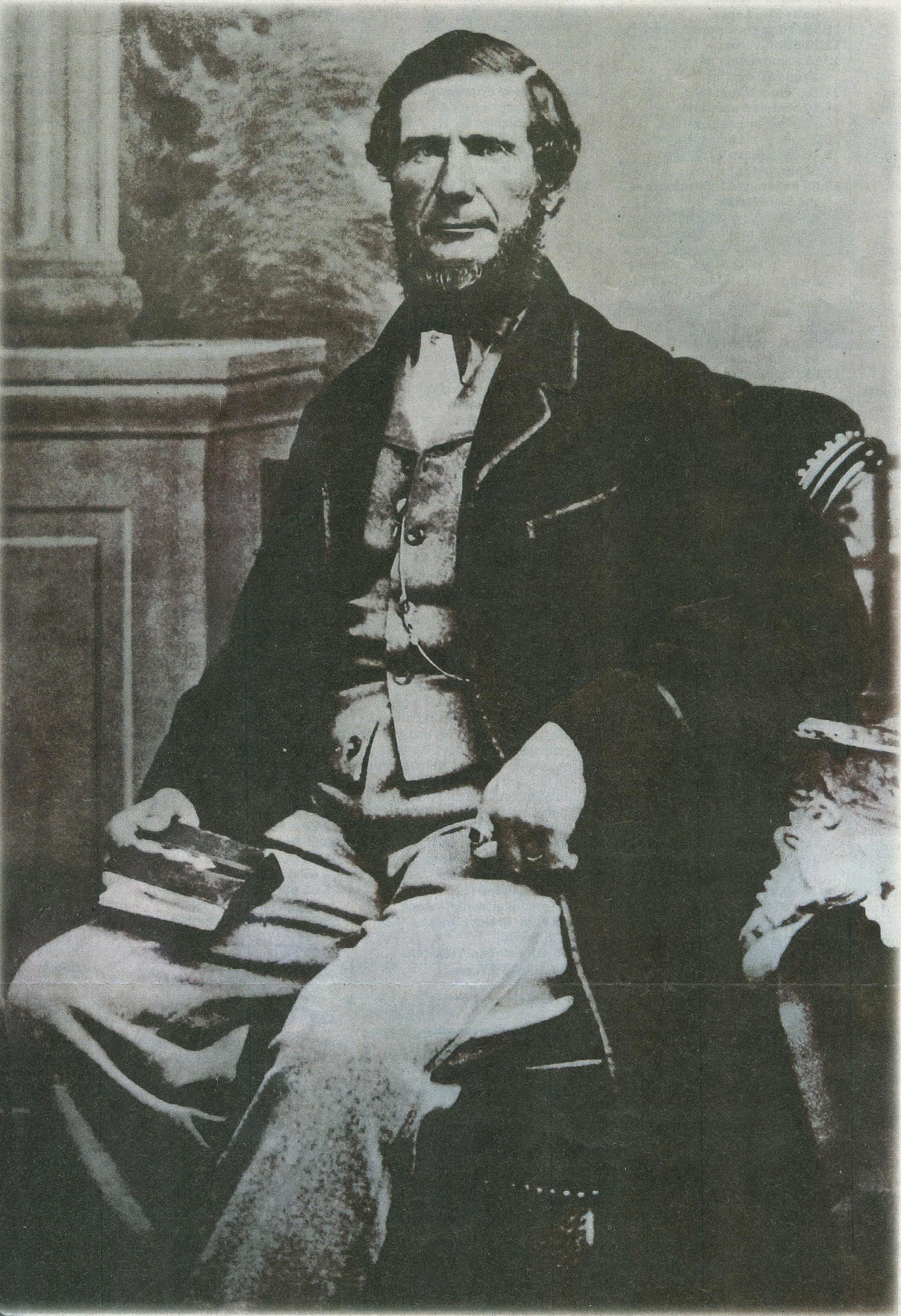
Carl Axel Setterberg

Carl Axel Setterberg (1812–1871) was a Swedish-born Finnish architect. Setterberg provided much of the urban design for the city of Vaasa, Finland.

== Biography ==
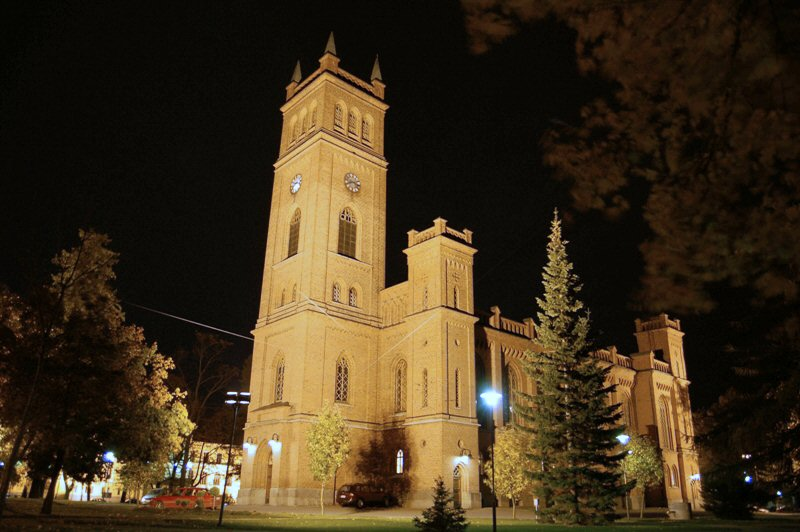
Vaasa Church was designed by Carl Axel Setterberg and completed in 1869

Setterberg was born at Bogsta parish in Södermanland, Sweden. He studied to become an architect at the Royal Swedish Academy of Fine Arts in Stockholm from 1834 to 1841. In May 1841, he got a job as building contractor in Gävleborg province, where he worked the following ten years. In this position he led many important building projects in Gävle and designed several public buildings.

When he heard that the city of Vaasa in Finland had burned down to the ground in 1852, he became interested in the opportunities surrounding the rebuilding of the city. He travelled to Vaasa where the job as county architect was open, and in January 1853 he was temporarily appointed for the job after impressing the county governor Berndt Federley (1799–1863). In 1855, he permanently became county architect after he had becoming citizen of the Grand Duchy of Finland.

In 1854, he became the city architect and was commissioned with drawing up the new city plan on the isthmus of Klemetsö, about seven kilometres (4.3 miles) to the northwest from the old town. The new town of Nikolaistad (Finnish: Nikolainkaupunki), named after the late Tsar Nicholas I, rose in 1862. The new city had a modern square layout and was divided by wide streets. Setterberg also designed many of the city's public and private buildings, like the Holy Trinity Church in 1869. In 1871, Setterberg died at Nikolaistad (renamed Vaasa during 1917).

In year 2000, Setterberg was voted the most significant person from Vaasa of all time. The poll was a part of Vaasa's 400th anniversary celebration.
