= Amy Archer-Gilligan =

American serial killer

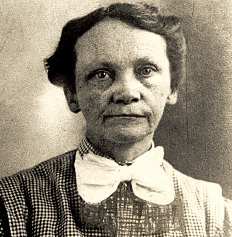
- Born: Amy E. Duggan; October 31, 1873; Milton, Connecticut, U.S.
- Died: April 23, 1962 (aged 88); Middletown, Connecticut, U.S.
- Other name: Sister Theresa
- Motive: Life insurance money
- Convictions: First degree murder; reduced to second degree murder
- Penalty: Death; commuted to life imprisonment

Details
- Victims: 5+
- Span of crimes: 1907–1917
- Country: United States
- State: Connecticut
- Date apprehended: 1917

Amy Duggan "Sister" Archer-Gilligan (October 31, 1873 – April 23, 1962) was a nursing home proprietor and serial killer from Windsor, Connecticut. She murdered at least five people by poisoning them. One of her victims was her second husband, Michael Gilligan; the others were residents of her nursing home.

It is possible that Archer-Gilligan was involved in more deaths. The authorities counted 48 deaths in her nursing home, the "Archer Home for the Elderly and Infirm."

The case attracted wide publicity at the time and has been cited as an inspiration for the play Arsenic and Old Lace.

== Childhood and marriages ==
Amy E. Duggan was born on October 31, 1873, to James Duggan and Mary Kennedy in Milton, Connecticut, the eighth of ten children. She attended the Milton School and the New Britain Normal School in 1890.

Amy Duggan married James Archer in 1897. A daughter, Mary J. Archer, was born in December 1897. The Archers first became caretakers in 1901, hired to care for John Seymour, an elderly widower. They moved into his home in Newington, Connecticut. Seymour died in 1904. His heirs converted the residence into a boarding house for the elderly, and the Archers remained to provide care for the elderly for a fee. They paid rent to Seymour's family. They ran the boarding house as Sister Amy's Nursing Home for the Elderly.

In 1907, Seymour's heirs sold the house. The Archers moved to Windsor, Connecticut and used their savings to purchase their own residence on Prospect Street in Windsor Center. They soon converted it into a business, Archer Home for the Elderly and Infirm.

James Archer died in 1910, apparently of natural causes. The official cause of his death was Bright's disease, a generic term for kidney diseases. Amy Archer had taken out an insurance policy on him a few weeks before his death. The policy benefit enabled her to continue operating Archer Home.

In 1913, Amy married Michael W. Gilligan, a widower with four adult sons. He was reportedly wealthy and interested in both Amy and in investing in the Archer Home. However, on February 20, 1914, after only three months married to Amy, Michael died. The official cause of death was "acute bilious attack" (in other words, severe indigestion). Amy was once again financially secure because during their short marriage her new husband had drawn up a will which left his entire estate to her. The will would later be determined a forgery as it was apparently written in handwriting matching Amy Archer-Gilligan's own.

== Murders ==
Between 1907 and 1917, there were 60 deaths in the Archer Home. Relatives of her clients grew suspicious as they tallied the large number of deaths. Only 12 residents died between 1907 and 1910, but 48 residents died between 1911 and 1916. Among them was Franklin R. Andrews, an apparently healthy man. On the morning of May 29, 1914, Andrews was doing some gardening in the Archer house. His robust physical condition deteriorated in a single day and he was dead by evening. The official cause of death was gastric ulcer.

After Andrews' siblings (including Nellie Pierce) came into possession of some of his letters, they noted occasions where Amy Archer-Gilligan was pressing their brother for money. Amy's clients showed a pattern of dying not long after giving her a large sum of money.

As the deaths continued, Nellie Pierce reported her suspicions to the local district attorney, but he mostly ignored her. So she took her story to the Hartford Courant. On May 9, 1916, the first of several articles on the "Murder Factory" was published. A few months later, the police started to seriously investigate the case. The investigation took almost a year to complete.

The bodies of Gilligan, Andrews, and three other boarders were exhumed. All five had died of poisoning, either arsenic or strychnine. Local merchants were able to testify that Amy had been purchasing large quantities of arsenic, supposedly to "kill rats". A look into Gilligan's will established that it was actually a forgery written by Amy.

According to M. William Phelps, author of The Devil's Rooming House, investigation appeared to show that Amy was buying the arsenic to kill large numbers of rats. However, it appears that she did not buy all of the arsenic which killed her patients. The doctor and some of the patients had signed off to purchase it. The investigation pursued Dr. King because more evidence was piling up against him, but suspicions were focused back on Amy when someone suggested to clearly check all records of arsenic purchases.

When evidence was found of Amy sending her patients to the drugstore to buy quantities of arsenic, the police were able to arrest and convict her.

== Trials ==
Archer-Gilligan was arrested and tried for murder, originally on five counts. Ultimately her lawyer managed to have the charges reduced to a single count, the murder of Franklin R. Andrews. On June 18, 1917, a jury found her guilty, and she was sentenced to death.

Archer-Gilligan appealed and the Connecticut Supreme Court of Errors ordered a new trial in 1918. At this trial, she pled insanity. Mary Archer testified that her mother was addicted to morphine. Archer-Gilligan was again found guilty of murder, but this time she was sentenced only to life imprisonment.

== Death ==
In 1924, Archer-Gilligan was declared to be temporarily insane and was transferred to the Connecticut Hospital for the Insane in Middletown, where she remained until her death on April 23, 1962. In 2015, the Connecticut Supreme Court decided a case about access to Archer-Gilligan's medical records from her imprisonment, ruling the files were exempt from disclosure under the state's open records law.

== See also ==
- List of serial killers in the United States
- List of medical and pseudo-medical serial killers
