= Holy Trinity Church, Vaasa =

Church in Vaasa, Finland

Vaasa Holy Trinity Church Finnish: Vaasan kirkko Swedish: Trefaldighetskyrkan
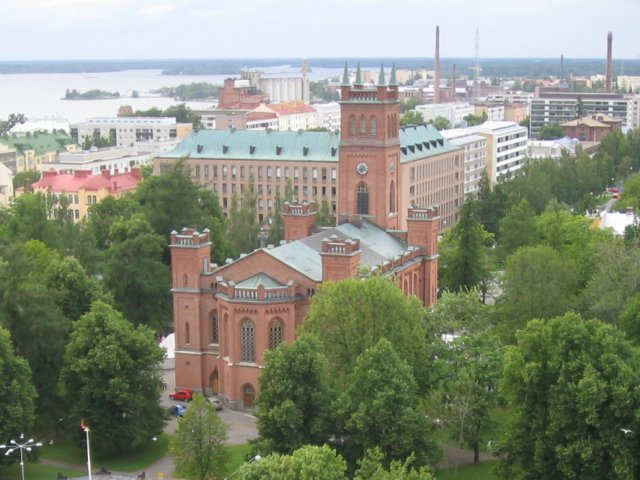

Religion
- Affiliation: Evangelical Lutheran Church of Finland
- Ecclesiastical or organizational status: Church (building)

Location
- Location: Vaasa, Finland
- Interactive map of Vaasa Holy Trinity Church; Finnish: Vaasan kirkko Swedish: Trefaldighetskyrkan
- Coordinates: 63°05′40.96″N 021°36′36.43″E

Architecture
- Architect: Carl Axel Setterberg
- Style: English Gothic
- Completed: 1869

Specifications
- Capacity: 900
- Materials: Brick

The Vaasa Holy Trinity Church (Finnish: Vaasan kirkko; Swedish: Vasas trefaldighetskyrkan), or simply the Vaasa Church, is a church located in the city center of Vaasa in Ostrobothnia, Finland. The 900-seat red-brick church, designed by architect Carl Axel Setterberg, was completed in 1869.

Vaasa Church is a long church with three naves. In terms of style, the church mainly represents English Gothic. There are three altarpieces in the church, each painted by Albert Edelfelt, R. W. Ekman and Louis Sparre. There are a total of about 900 seats in the hall and galleries of the church, and 130 in the crypt downstairs. The church's 45-voice main pipe organ was acquired in 1975 and is manufactured by the Danish company Marcussen & Søn.

== History ==
Carl Axel Setterberg made preliminary plans and cost estimates for the church in 1857. The drawings were approved the following year after certain changes. The first official worship was organized in the church in 1862, after which it began to be used almost continuously. However, it was not officially inaugurated until September 5, 1869, as the final inspection of the church and the completion of the movables and interior structures were delayed.

The Vaasa church was wanted in a central place when the city moved to its current location after the 1852 Great Fire of Vaasa, and it was wanted to create one of the clear monuments of the rebuilt city. The church was renovated in 1960–1961.
