= Trinitatiskirche, Dresden =

Church building in Dresden, Germany

Coordinates: 51°03′10″N 13°46′15″E

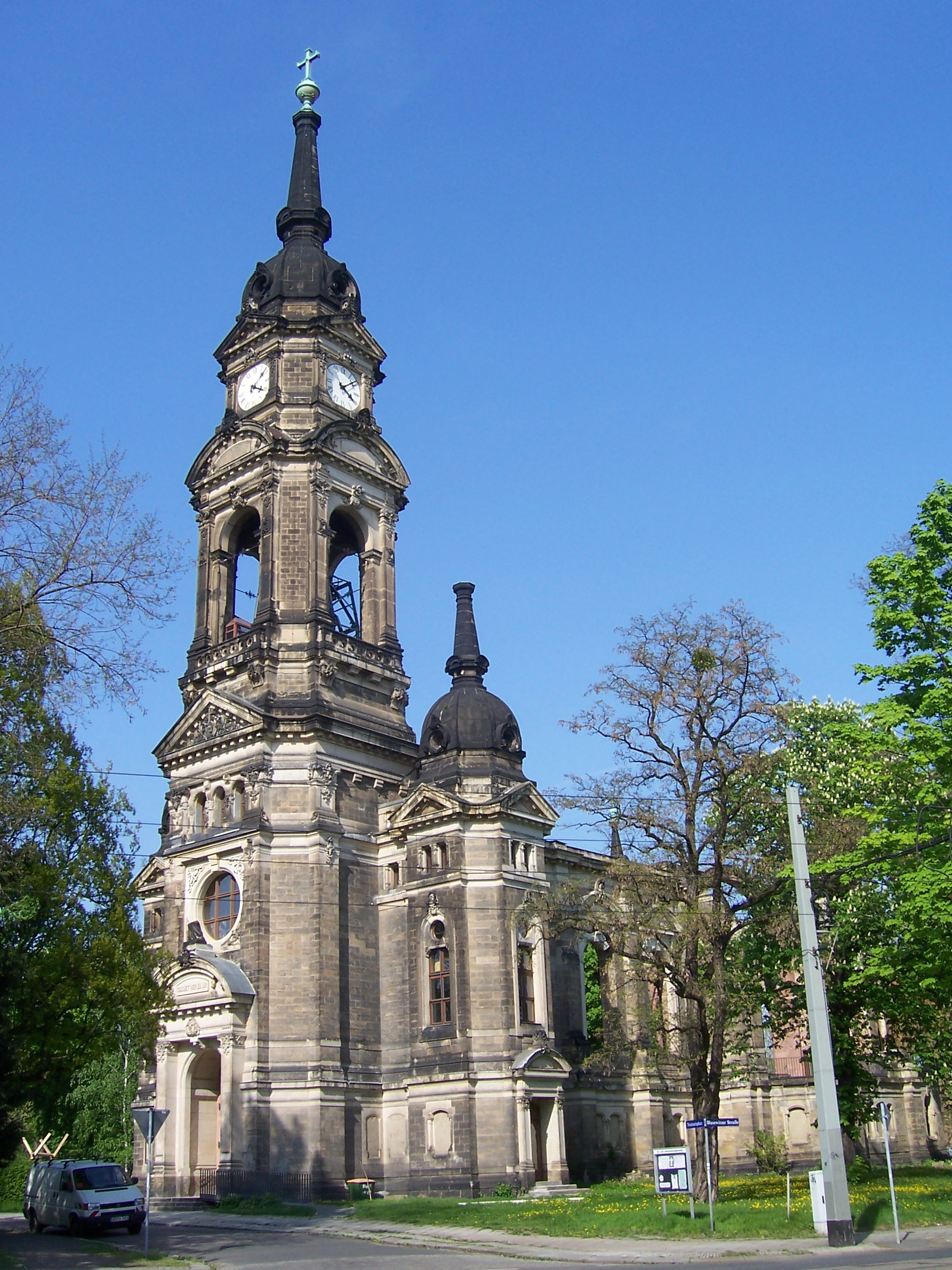
Trinitatiskirche

The Trinitatiskirche (Trinity Church) was a church building dedicated to the Holy Trinity in the Johannstadt district of Dresden. It was built from 1891 to 1893. The bombing raids of February 1945 completely burned down its aisle, badly damaged the main walls and parish hall, slightly damaged the bell tower and completely destroyed the roof and interior. The debris began to be removed in 1945 and the tower provisionally repaired in 1950. The hall was rebuilt in the mid-1950s and plans in the 1960s to pull down the church ruins were stopped by the parish developing a project to build a room for church services and a conference centre, and so the church's ruins still remain.

Following the collapse of Communism and German reunification, the church ruin has been used as a youth center. The main nave and aisles, which are open to the elements as the roof was never replaced, have provided space for meetings, concerts, film screenings, and other activities in keeping with the mission of providing leisure-time alternatives for the area's young people. The surviving spire of the church was renovated and outfitted with a new spiral staircase and rooms for youth center administration, meetings, music band practice, and so on.
