= Church of the Life-Giving Trinity (Kamensk-Shakhtinsky) =

- Церковь Троицы Живоначальной
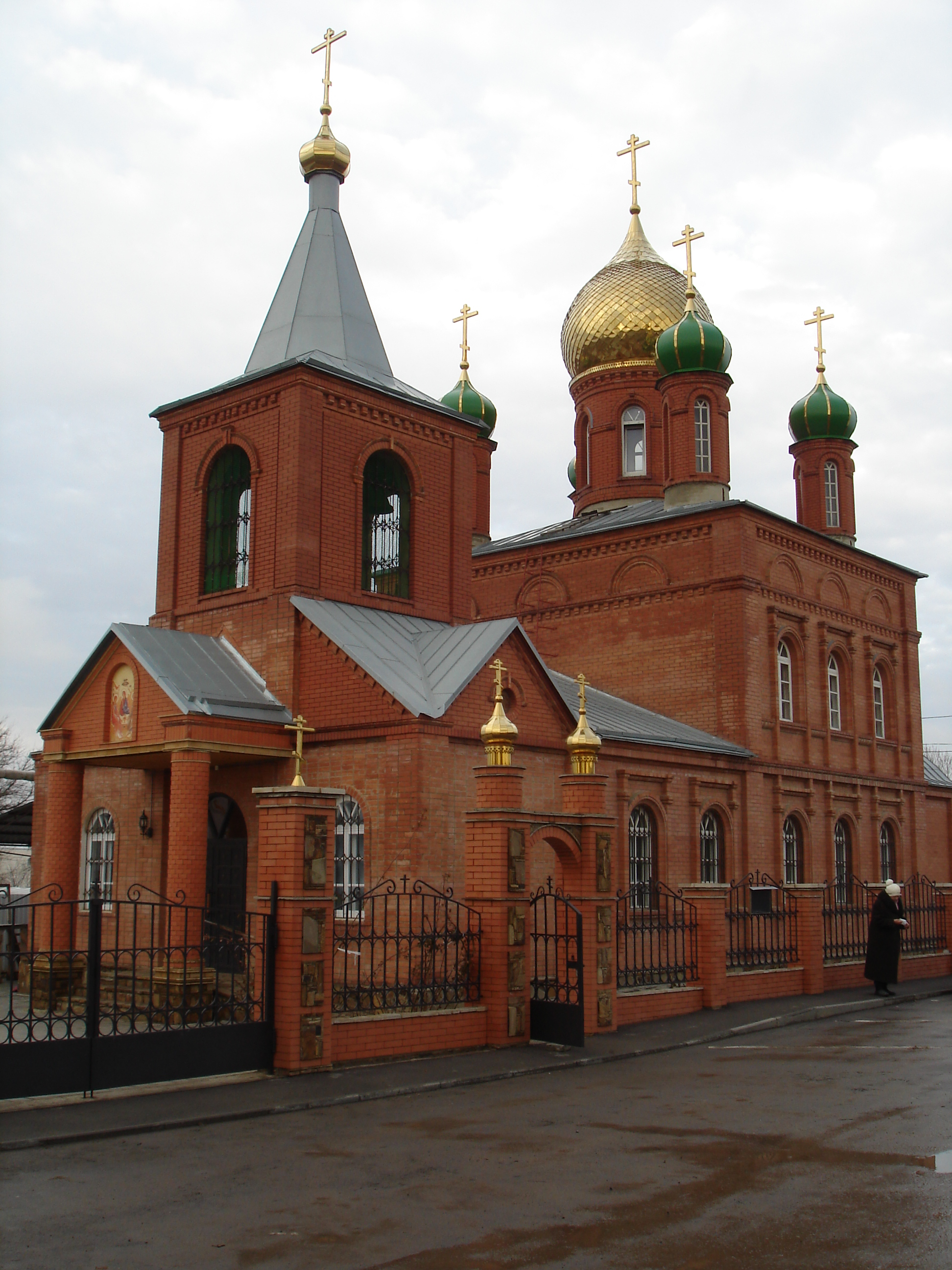
- Exterior of the church
- Church of the Life-Giving Trinity
- 48.1801°N 40.1427°E
- Location: Kamensk-Shakhtinsky, Rostov Oblast
- Country: Russia
- Denomination: Eastern Orthodox

History
- Status: Parish church
- Dedication: Holy Trinity
- Dedicated: 9 July 1998

Architecture
- Functional status: Active
- Groundbreaking: 24 June 2003

Administration
- Division: Patriarchate of Moscow and All Russia
- Diocese: Shakhty and Millerovo diocese
- Deanery: Kamenskoe deanery

The Church of the Life-Giving Trinity (Russian: Церковь Троицы Живоначальной or Свято-Троицкая церковь) is a Russian Orthodox church in Kamensk-Shakhtinsky, Rostov Oblast, Russia. It belongs to Kamenskoe deanery of Shakhty and Millerovo diocese.

== History ==
The Holy Trinity parish was established in Kamensk-Shakhtinsky in April 1997. In 1998, the parish was granted a building in which a prayer house was arranged. The church itself was opened on July 9, 1998, and has only one altar consecrated in honour of the Holy Trinity. Subsequently, a dome was also built there, and in 2003 a belfry was installed with new bells. Now there are five domes, a refectory and a low bell tower. Building's architecture resembles that of the late 19th century.

The Holy Trinity possesses a fragment of the holy relics of St. Tikhon of Zadonsk, who was a Bishop of Voronezh and a wonderworker.

In the church there are also a canteen for homeless, a Sunday school, church charity shop and a choir.

Interior

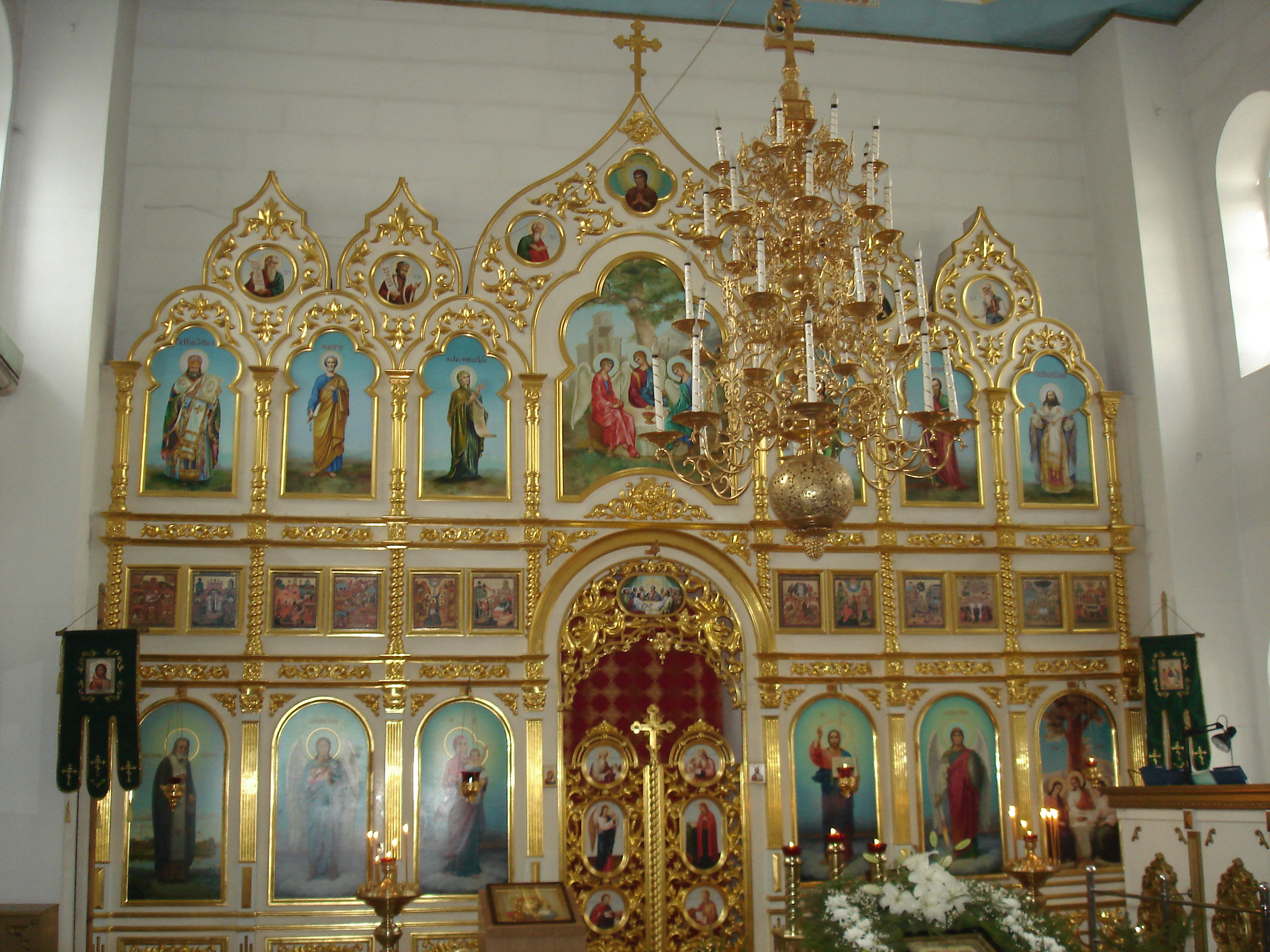

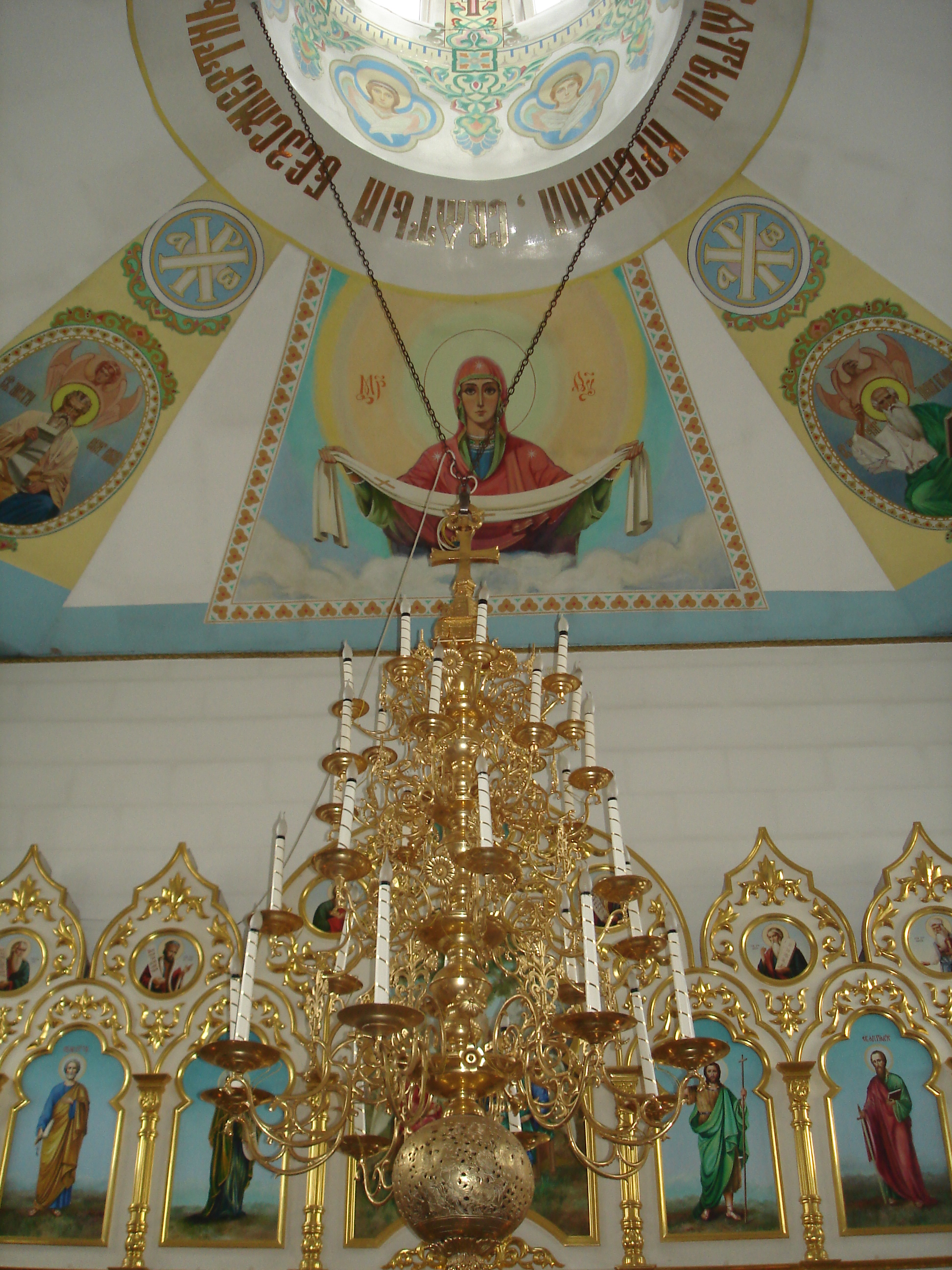

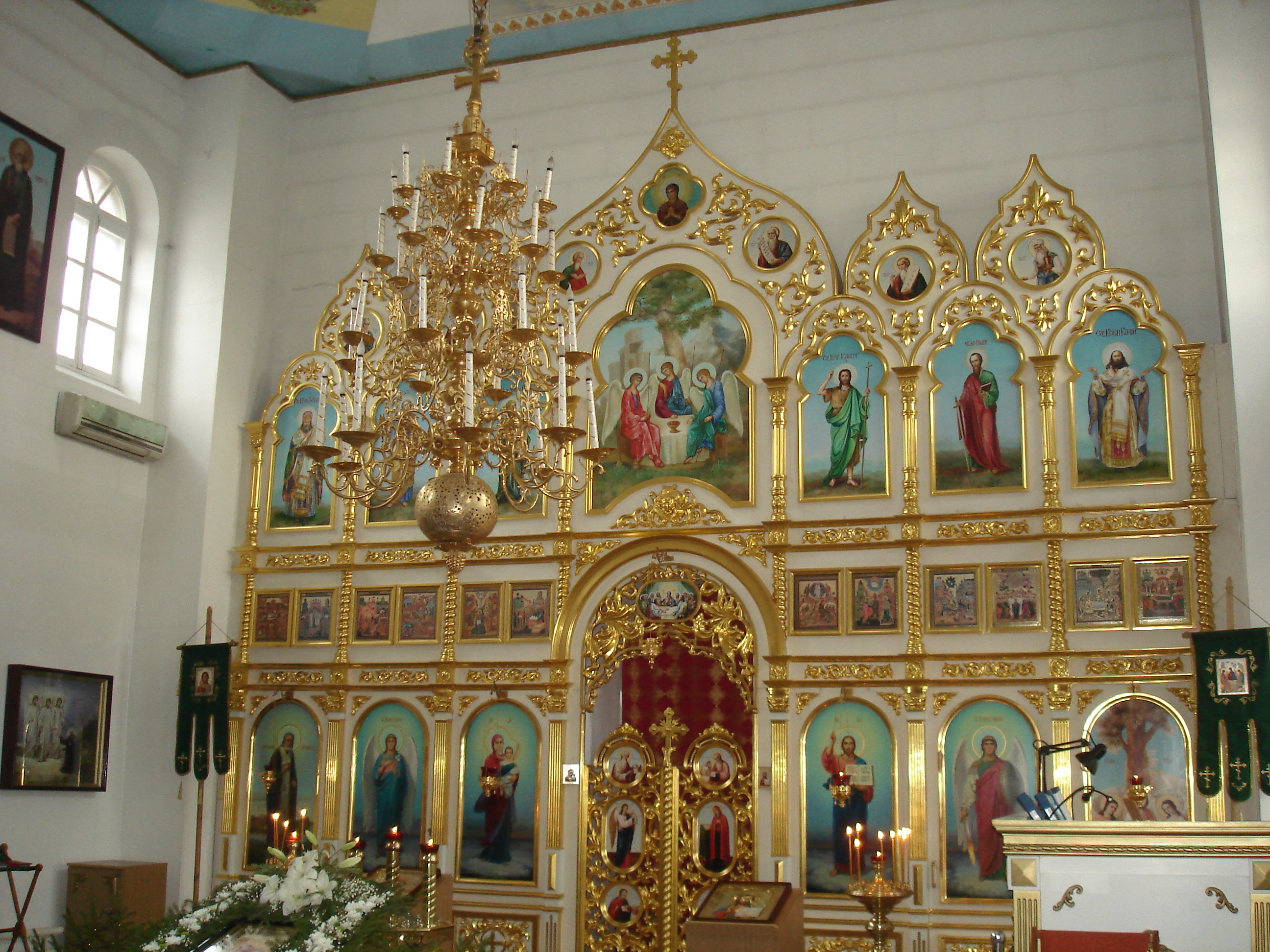
