= Church of the Life-Giving Trinity (Volchensky) =

Church in Rostov Oblast, Russia

- Церковь Троицы Живоначальной
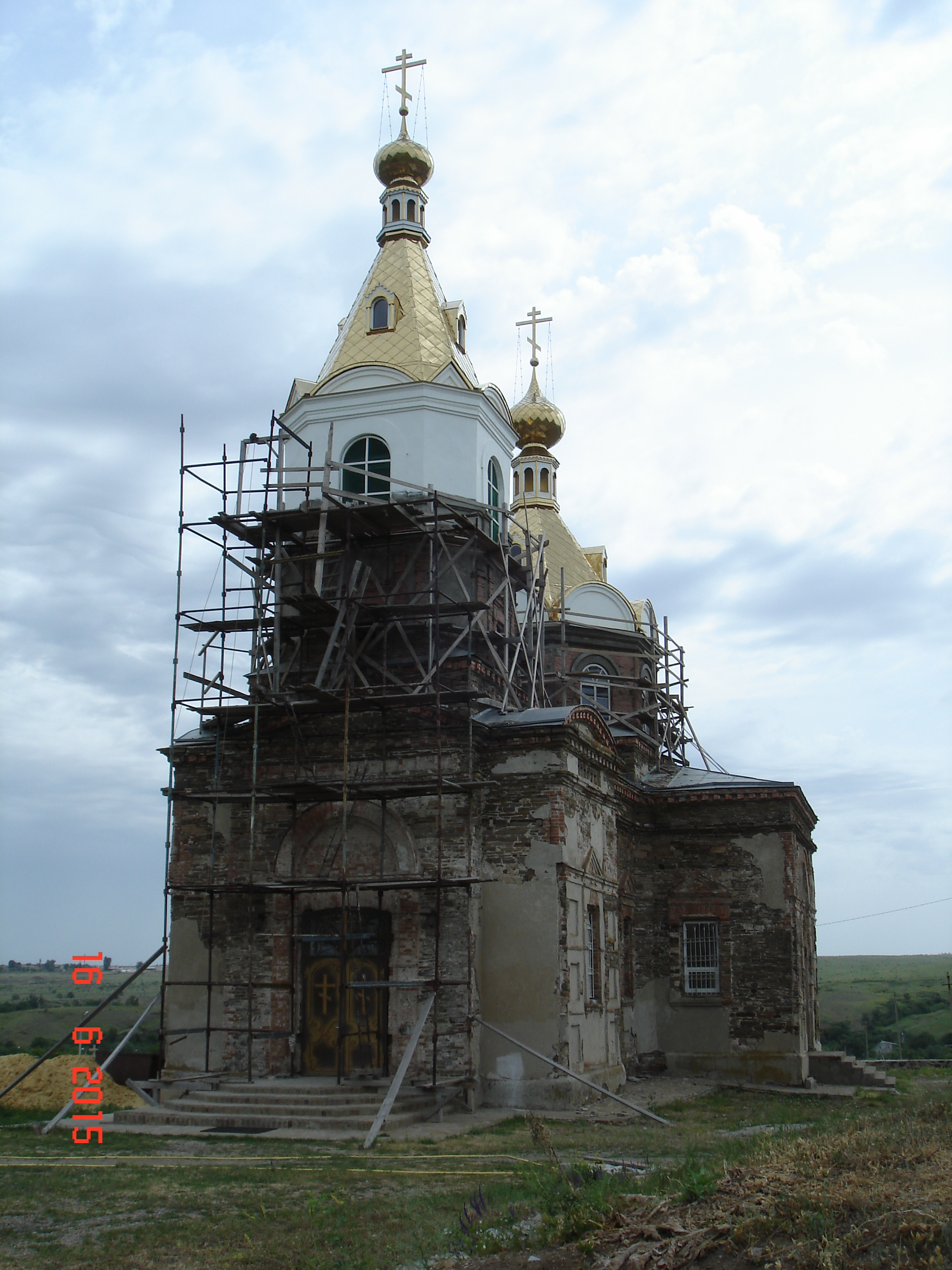
- Church of the Life-Giving Trinity
- 48.1410°N 40.0701°E
- Location: Volchensky khutor, Kamensky District, Rostov Oblast, Russia
- Country: Russia
- Denomination: Eastern Orthodox

History
- Status: Parish church
- Dedication: Holy Trinity

Architecture
- Functional status: Active
- Completed: 1892

Administration
- Division: Patriarchate of Moscow and All Russia
- Diocese: Diocese of Rostov

The Church of the Life-Giving Trinity (Russian: Церковь Троицы Живоначальной or Свято-Троицкая церковь) is a Russian Orthodox church in Volchensky khutor, Kamensky District, Rostov Oblast, Russia. It belongs to Diocese of Rostov.

== History ==
The Trinity Church in Volchensky farm was completed in 1892. The church was built in the form of an unequal cross with a two-tiered bell tower. In the same year, on the permission of the Holy Synod, an independent parish was established for the church. The first service there was held on the feast of the Trinity. In 1894 a parish school began to function there, and later, under the Soviet government, it was transformed to seven-year school.

The church's construction was carried out with funds collected by local dwellers and lasted for about eight years. Father Mikhail was the first priest to serve there.

The church was closed in 1938. During the Nazi occupation it was opened, but in 1961 was again closed. Its premises were used as a granary.

In 2003, local Cossacks, led by the head of the settlement N.S. Kudinov, officially registered the parish and began to restore the Holy Trinity Church. On September 3, 2008, crosses were erected on dome of the church, and in 2010 bells were also installed. On September 13, 2011, Father Pavel held a festive liturgy.

As of 2015, the church was still being reconstructed.
