= Trinity Anglican Church (Cambridge, Ontario) =

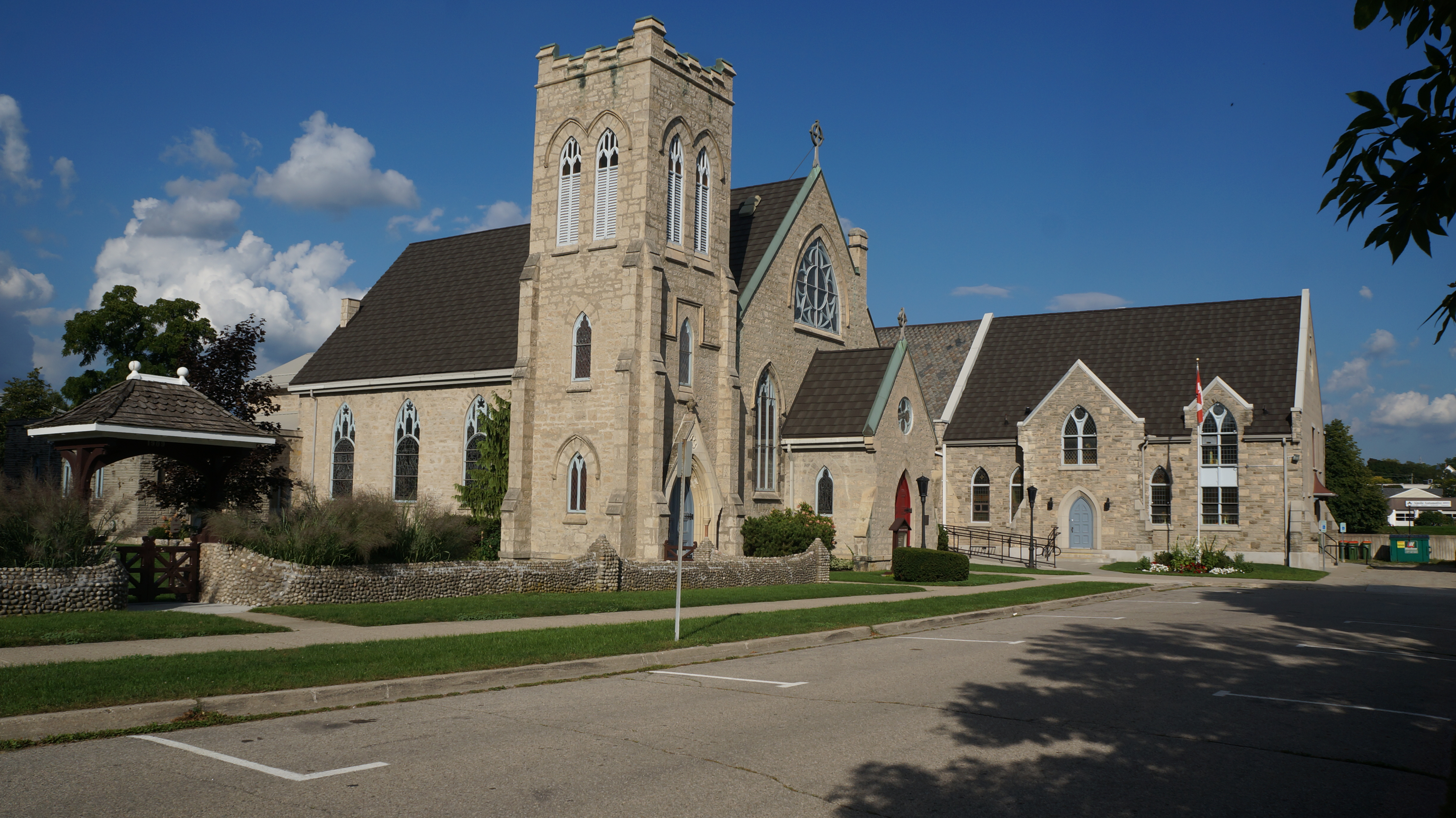

- Location of the church in Ontario
- 43°21′39″N 80°19′01″W
- Location: Cambridge, Ontario
- Country: Canada
- Denomination: Anglican Church of Canada
- Website: www.trinityanglican.on.ca

History
- Consecrated: 1844

Administration
- Province: Ontario
- Diocese: Huron
- Deanery: Waterloo

Clergy
- Rector: The Revd Greg Jenkins

Trinity Anglican Church is a parish of the Anglican Church of Canada located in Cambridge, Ontario, Canada. The church was built and consecrated in 1844, four years following the incorporation of the parish, by the Rt. Rev. John Strachan. The Hon. Wm. Dickson donated the land on the right bank of the Grand River and together with his superintendent/manager, Absalom Shade, bore a large portion of the cost of clearing the land and building the church. Both men were founders of Galt, Ontario. Through a bequest by Absalom Shade, Trinity House, the Italianate style rectory, was built in 1873. The park in front of Trinity Church was also a gift of the Dickson family and is open to the public. Trinity Anglican Church is the oldest stone church in Waterloo Region.

== Arms ==
Coat of arms of Trinity Anglican Church

Notes
Granted 20 September 2019
Escutcheon
Argent a cross triparted and fretted Gules on a chief wavy Azure three crosses patté convexed Argent each surmounted by a torteau.
Motto
Serve The Lord With Gladness
Badge
A hurt edged Or charged with a cross patté convexed Argent surmounted by a torteau.
