= Trinity Methodist Church (Franklin, Tennessee) =

Historic church in Tennessee, United States

- U.S. National Register of Historic Places
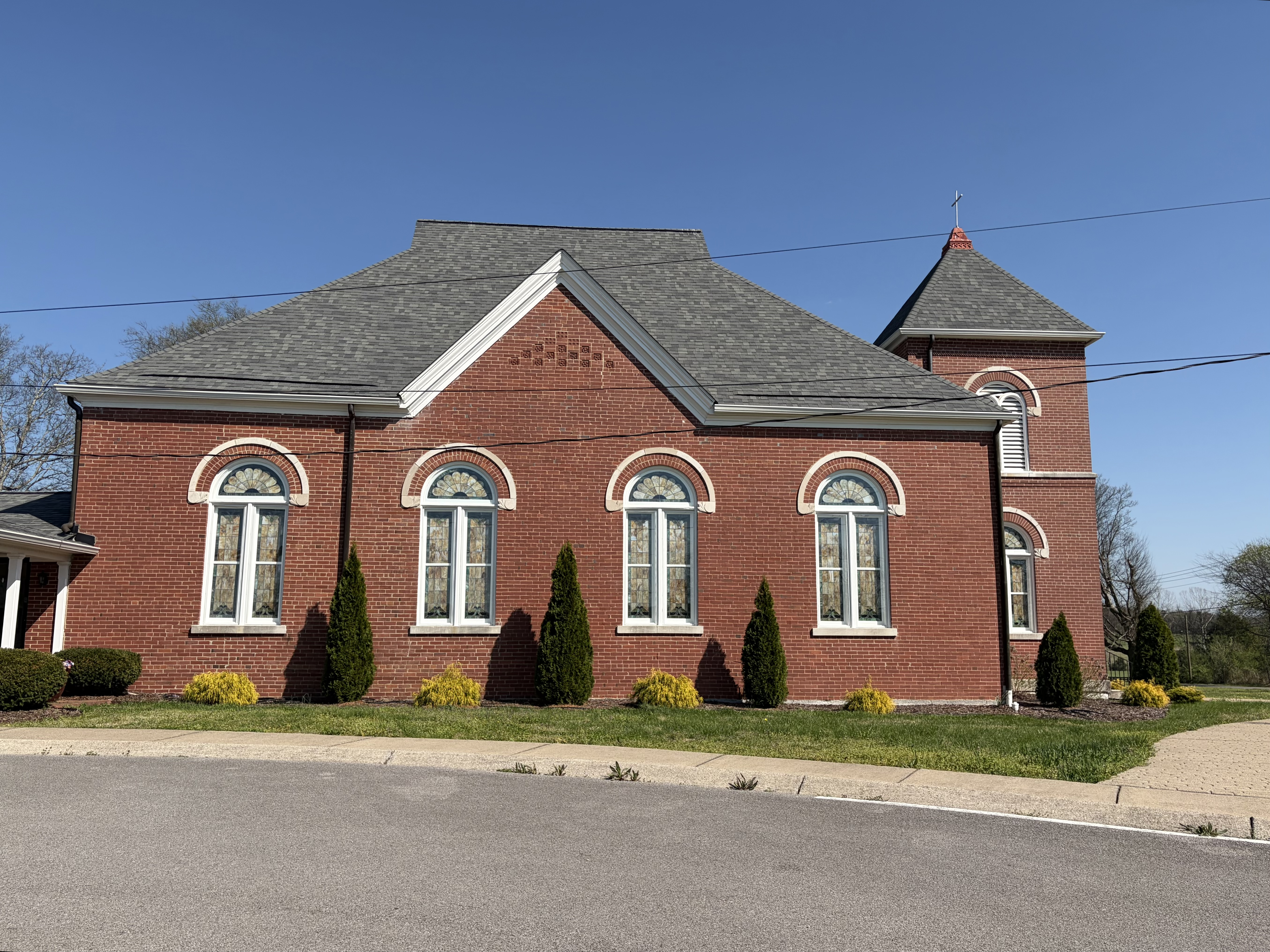
- Trinity Methodist Church in 2026

- Location within Tennessee Location within the United States
- Location: Wilson Pike 1 1/2 mi. S of Clovercroft Rd., Franklin, Tennessee
- Coordinates: 35°54′38″N 86°45′11″W
- Area: 1 acre (0.40 ha)
- Built: 1897 and 1909
- Built by: Stewart Ironworks
- Architectural style: Romanesque
- MPS: Williamson County MRA
- NRHP reference No.: 88000362
- Added to NRHP: April 13, 1988

Trinity Methodist Church is a property in Franklin, Tennessee, that was listed on the National Register of Historic Places in 1988. Built in 1897, it was constructed by Stewart Ironworks. The NRHP eligibility of this and other properties was evaluated in a 1988 study of Williamson County historical resources. The church disaffiliated from the United Methodist Church in 2022 and became an independent Methodist congregation.
