= Academy of Music and Dramatic Arts (Esbjerg) =

Music academy in Esbjerg, Denmark

Coordinates: 55.4705°N 8.4507°E

Danish National Academy of Music, Esbjerg
- Syddansk Musikkonservatorium
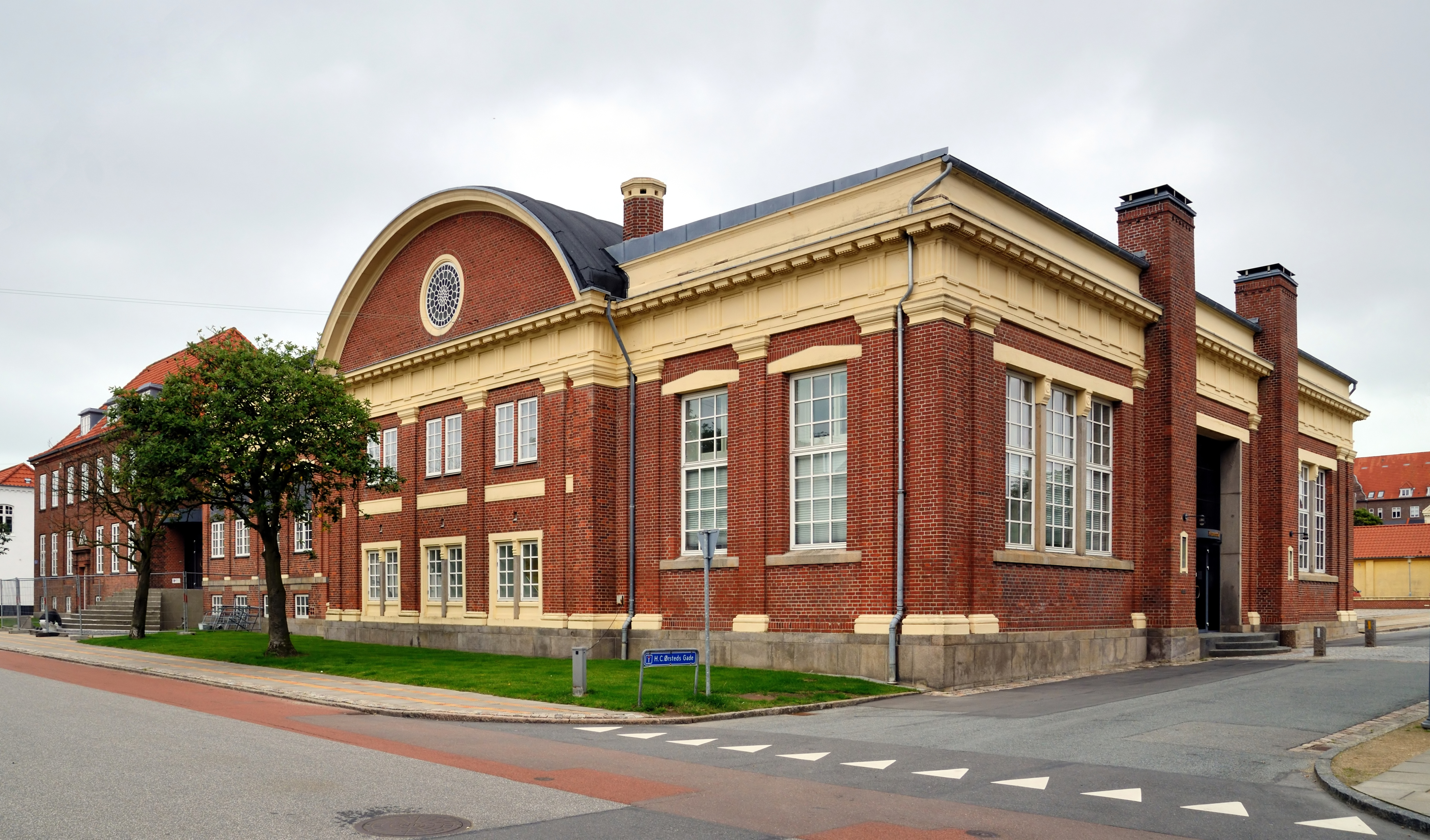
- Danish National Academy of Music, Esbjerg
- Type: Public
- Established: 1946
- Principal: Claus Skjold Larsen
- Location: Esbjerg, Denmark
- Website: http://www.sdmk.dk/

Syddansk Musikkonservatorium - Danish National Academy of Music, as it is now known, is located in Esbjerg, Denmark, opposite St Nikolaj Church. Founded in 1946 as a local private initiative, it was first known as Vestjysk Musikkonservatorium. In 1972, it was taken over by the national authorities.

Since 1998, it has been located in the refurbished and modernized premises of a former power plant built in 1907. In January 2010, the Esbjerg conservatory was merged with two other Danish institutions: the conservatory in Odense (formerly known as the Det Fynske Musikkonservatorium/The Carl Nielsen Academy of Music, Odense), and the acting school in Odense (formerly known as Skuespillerskolen ved Odense Teater). As a result, the Vestjysk Musikkonservatorium/The Academy of Music and Music Communication became the Esbjerg branch of the Academy of Music and Dramatic Arts, Southern Denmark (AMDA).

As a result of its excellent acoustics, the conservatory's concert hall (once the power station's turbine hall) with seating for 198 is considered to be one of Europe's best venues for chamber music. The complex also provides facilities for conferences and meetings which are used by a variety of cultural institutions and collaborators.
