= 2023 Detroit Lions season =

94th season in franchise history, first playoff berth since 2016

- Owner: Sheila Ford Hamp
- General manager: Brad Holmes
- Head coach: Dan Campbell
- Offensive coordinator: Ben Johnson
- Defensive coordinator: Aaron Glenn
- Home stadium: Ford Field

Results
- Record: 12–5
- Division place: 1st NFC North
- Playoffs: Won Wild Card Playoffs (vs. Rams) 24–23; Won Divisional Playoffs (vs. Buccaneers) 31–23; Lost NFC Championship (at 49ers) 31–34
- All-Pros: 5: RT Penei Sewell (1st team); WR Amon-Ra St. Brown (1st team); C Frank Ragnow (2nd team); TE Sam LaPorta (2nd team); ST Jalen Reeves-Maybin (2nd team)
- Pro Bowlers: 7: RT Penei Sewell; DE Aidan Hutchinson; C Frank Ragnow; TE Sam LaPorta; ST Jalen Reeves-Maybin; WR Amon-Ra St. Brown; RB Jahmyr Gibbs

Uniform
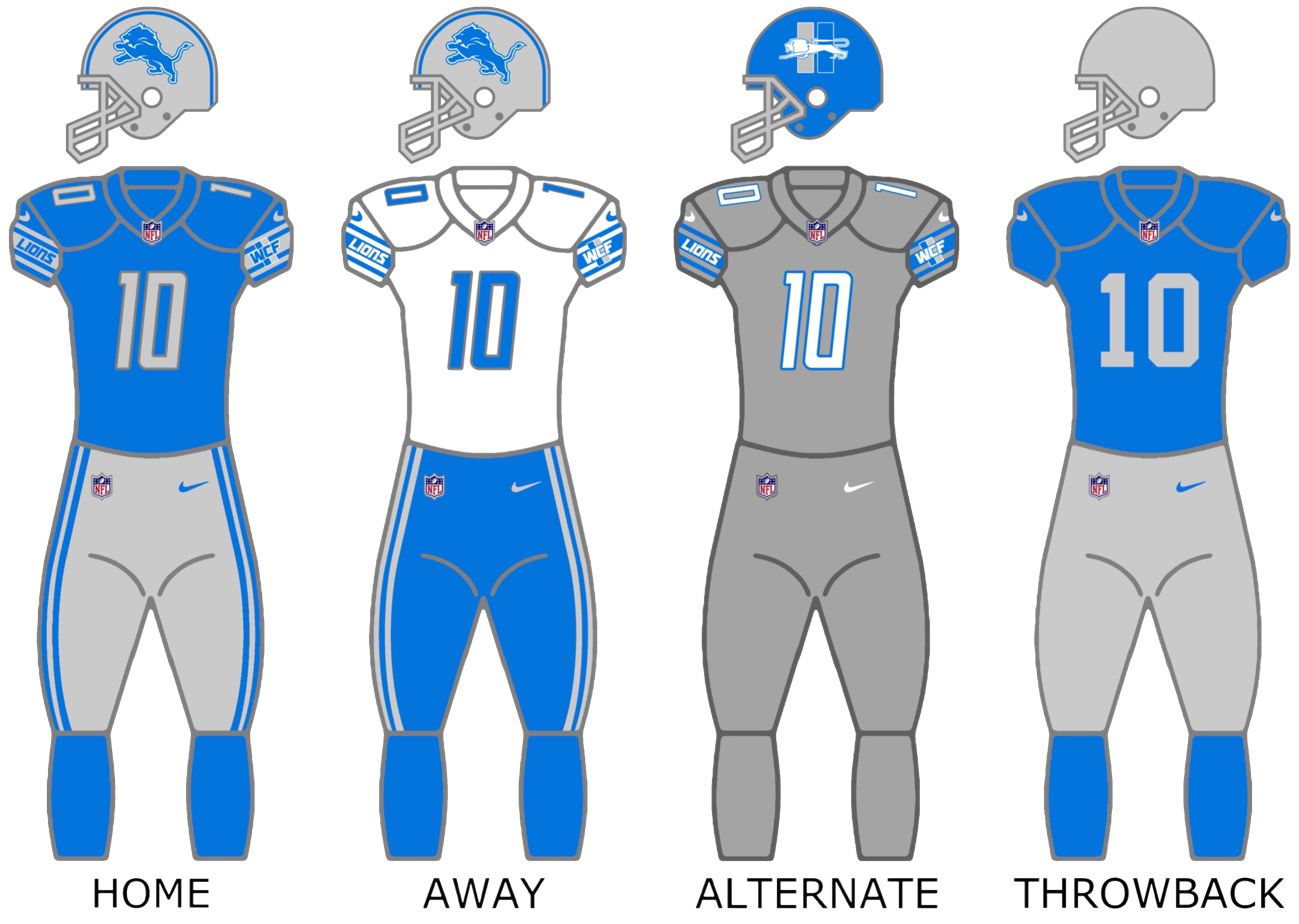

The 2023 season was the Detroit Lions' 94th season in the National Football League (NFL), their 90th In Detroit, and their third under the head coach/general manager tandem of Dan Campbell and Brad Holmes.

The Lions improved upon their 9–8 record from the previous season, after a Week 15 win against the Denver Broncos gave them their first 10-win season since 2014. The Lions finished the regular season with a 12–5 record, tying a franchise record for wins and ending up in a three-way tie with the San Francisco 49ers and the Dallas Cowboys for the best record in the NFC. Their .706 winning percentage was their best since 1991.

After a win against the Chicago Bears in Week 11, the Lions started 8–2 for the first time since 1962. After a Week 16 win against the Minnesota Vikings, the Lions won their first division title since 1993, and their first ever as a member of the NFC North following the NFL's division realignment in 2002. This also marks their first playoff appearance since 2016. The win assured them their first home playoff game since 1993 and only their third since winning their last NFL title in 1957.

However, they were seeded third for the NFC playoffs, having lost the conference record tiebreaker to the 49ers and the head-to-head record to the Cowboys. In their first playoff game at Ford Field, the Lions defeated their former quarterback Matthew Stafford and current quarterback Jared Goff's former team, the Los Angeles Rams 24–23 in the Wild Card game for their first playoff victory since the 1991 season, ending the longest winless post-season drought in the NFL. The Lions hosted the Tampa Bay Buccaneers in the Divisional Round, which marked the first time the Lions hosted two playoff games in the same season in franchise history. The Lions defeated the Buccaneers 31–23 to advance to the NFC Championship for the first time since 1991. However, they blew a 24–7 lead at halftime and lost in the NFC Championship Game to the San Francisco 49ers 34–31.

The Detroit Lions drew an average home attendance of 64,850 in 8 home games in the 2023 NFL season, the 25th highest in the league.

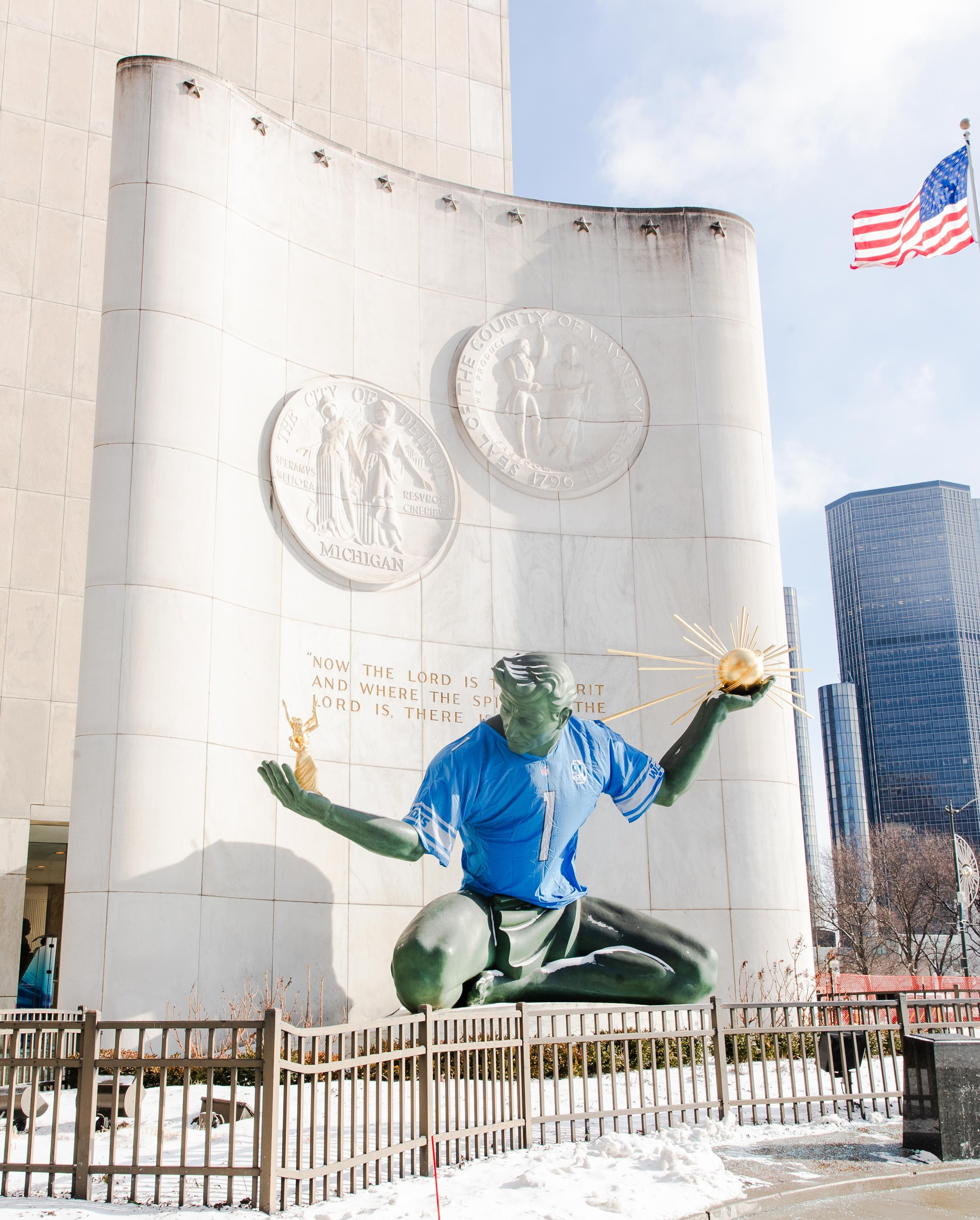
The Spirit of Detroit decorated with a Lions jersey in January 2024 to celebrate the Lions' postseason run

== Player movements ==
=== Free agents ===
Position	Player	Free agency tag	Date signed	2023 team	Source
LB	Alex Anzalone	UFA	March 15	Detroit Lions	
K	Michael Badgley	UFA	March 20	Detroit Lions	
LB	Chris Board	UFA	March 22	New England Patriots	
G	Evan Brown	UFA	April 3	Seattle Seahawks	
DE	Austin Bryant	UFA	March 23	San Francisco 49ers	
DT	Isaiah Buggs	UFA	March 13	Detroit Lions	
WR	D. J. Chark	UFA	March 24	Carolina Panthers	
DE	John Cominsky	UFA	March 15	Detroit Lions	
LS	Scott Daly	ERFA	March 22	Detroit Lions	
S	DeShon Elliott	UFA	March 17	Miami Dolphins	
S	Will Harris	UFA	March 16	Detroit Lions	
RB	Justin Jackson	UFA	July 22	Detroit Lions	
CB	Mike Hughes	UFA	March 20	Atlanta Falcons	
DT	Benito Jones	ERFA	April 26	Detroit Lions	
G	Tommy Kraemer	ERFA	August 2	New Orleans Saints	
S	C. J. Moore	UFA	March 20	Detroit Lions	
OT	Matt Nelson	RFA	March 14	Detroit Lions	
CB	Amani Oruwariye	UFA	March 23	New York Giants	
C	Ross Pierschbacher	RFA	March 8	Detroit Lions	
LB	Anthony Pittman	ERFA	March 13	Detroit Lions	
CB	Bobby Price	RFA	June 5	Arizona Cardinals	
RB	Craig Reynolds	ERFA	March 13	Detroit Lions	
G	Dan Skipper	RFA	August 1	Indianapolis Colts	
QB	Nate Sudfeld	UFA	March 24	Detroit Lions	
RB	Jamaal Williams	UFA	March 17	New Orleans Saints	
LB	Josh Woods	UFA	March 23	Arizona Cardinals	
TE	Brock Wright	ERFA	March 13	Detroit Lions	
TE	Shane Zylstra	ERFA	March 13	Detroit Lions	

=== Additions ===
Position	Player	Previous team	Date	Source
S	C. J. Gardner-Johnson	Philadelphia Eagles	March 20	
G	Graham Glasgow	Denver Broncos	March 20	
WR	Marvin Jones Jr.	Jacksonville Jaguars	April 5	
CB	Mac McCain	Philadelphia Eagles	February 23	
LS	Jake McQuaide	Dallas Cowboys	March 20	
RB	David Montgomery	Chicago Bears	March 16	
CB	Emmanuel Moseley	San Francisco 49ers	March 16	
LB	Jalen Reeves-Maybin	Houston Texans	March 27	
CB	Cameron Sutton	Pittsburgh Steelers	March 16	
TE	Patrick Murtaugh	N/A	May 4	

=== Releases ===
Position	Player	2023 team	Release date	Source
DT	Michael Brockers		February 24	
CB	Jeff Okudah	Atlanta Falcons	April 11	
WR	Quintez Cephus		April 21	
S	C. J. Moore		April 21	
RB	D'Andre Swift	Philadelphia Eagles	April 29	
G	Logan Stenberg	Chicago Bears	August 10	
WR	Marvin Jones Jr.		October 24	

== Draft ==
2023 Detroit Lions draft selections
Round	Selection	Player	Position	College	Notes	Source
1	6	Traded to the Arizona Cardinals (Note: The Lions traded first- and third-round selections (6th and 81st overall) to the Arizona Cardinals in exchange for first-, second- and fifth-round selections (12th, 34th and 168th overall).)			From Rams (Note: The Lions traded QB Matthew Stafford to the Los Angeles Rams in exchange for a first-round selection (6th overall), a 2022 first-round selection, a 2021 third-round selection and QB Jared Goff.)	
1	12	Jahmyr Gibbs	RB	Alabama	From Browns via Texans and Cardinals	
1	18	Jack Campbell	LB	Iowa		
2	34	Sam LaPorta	TE	Iowa	From Cardinals	
2	45	Brian Branch	S	Alabama	From Packers (Note: The Lions traded second- and fifth-round selections (48th and 159th overall) to the Green Bay Packers in exchange for a second-round selection (45th overall).)	
2	48	Traded to the Green Bay Packers				
2	55	Traded to the Kansas City Chiefs (Note: The Lions traded second- and sixth-round selections (55th and 194th overall) to the Kansas City Chiefs in exchange for second-, fourth- and seventh-round selections (63rd, 122nd and 249th overall).)			From Vikings (Note: The Lions traded a fourth-round selection, a conditional 2024 fourth-round selection (that would have become a fifth if the Vikings won a playoff game in 2022, but it was not met) and TE T. J. Hockenson to the Minnesota Vikings in exchange for a second-round selection (55th overall) and a 2024 third-round selection.)	
2	63	Traded to the Denver Broncos (Note: The Lions traded second- and sixth-round selections (63rd and 183rd overall) to the Denver Broncos in exchange for third- and fifth-round selections (68th and 138th overall).)			From Chiefs	
3	68	Hendon Hooker	QB	Tennessee	From Broncos	
3	81	Traded to the Arizona Cardinals				
3	96	Brodric Martin	DT	Western Kentucky	From Cardinals (Note: The Lions traded a fourth-round selection and two fifth-round selections (122nd, 139th and 168th overall) to the Arizona Cardinals in exchange for a third-round selection (96th overall).)	
4	119	Traded to the Minnesota Vikings				
4	122	Traded to the Arizona Cardinals			From Dolphins via Chiefs	
5	139	Traded to the Arizona Cardinals			From Broncos	
5	152	Colby Sorsdal	OT	William & Mary		
5	159	Traded to the Green Bay Packers			From Jaguars via Falcons (Note: The Lions traded CB Jeff Okudah to the Atlanta Falcons in exchange for a fifth-round selection (159th overall).)	
5	168	Traded to the Arizona Cardinals			From Cardinals	
6	183	Traded to the Denver Broncos			From Broncos (Note: The Lions traded 2022 fifth- and seventh-round selections (145th and 234th overall) to the Denver Broncos in exchange for a sixth-round selection (183rd overall) and WR Trinity Benson.)	
6	194	Traded to the Kansas City Chiefs				
7	219	Antoine Green	WR	North Carolina	From Texans via Vikings and Eagles (Note: The Lions traded a seventh-round selection (249th overall) and RB D'Andre Swift to the Philadelphia Eagles in exchange for a seventh-round selection (219th overall) and a 2025 fourth-round selection.)	
7	235	Traded to the Los Angeles Rams (Note: The Lions traded a seventh-round selection (235th overall) to the Los Angeles Rams in exchange for DT Michael Brockers.)				
7	249	Traded to the Philadelphia Eagles			From Chiefs	

2023 Detroit Lions undrafted free agents
Name	Position	College	Ref.
Brad Cecil	C	South Florida	
Chase Cota	WR	Oregon	
Isaac Darkangelo	LB	Illinois	
Dylan Drummond	WR	Eastern Michigan	
Cory Durden	DT	NC State	
Connor Galvin	OT	Baylor	
Steven Gilmore Jr.	CB	Marshall	
Mohamed Ibrahim	RB	Minnesota	
Brandon Joseph	S	Notre Dame	
Adrian Martinez	QB	Kansas State	
Zach Morton	DE	Akron	
Trevor Nowaske	LB	Saginaw Valley State	
Chris Smith	DT	Notre Dame	
Ryan Swoboda	OT	UCF	
Starling Thomas V	CB	UAB	
Keytaon Thompson	WR	Virginia	

Draft trades

== Staff ==
2023 Detroit Lions staff
Front office: Owner – Sheila Ford Hamp; Vice chairpeople – William Clay Ford Jr., Martha Ford Morse and Elizabeth Ford Kontulis; Team president & CEO – Rod Wood; Executive vice president & general manager – Brad Holmes; Chief operating officer – Mike Disner; Special assistant to chairman and president & CEO – Chris Spielman; Assistant general manager – Ray Agnew; Director of player personnel – Lance Newmark; Director of pro scouting – Rob Lohman; Director of scouting advancement – Mike Martin; Senior director of football administration – Brandon Sosna; Senior personnel executive – John Dorsey; Head coaches: Head coach – Dan Campbell; Assistant head coach/running backs – Scottie Montgomery; Offensive coaches: Offensive coordinator – Ben Johnson; Passing game coordinator – Tanner Engstrand; Quarterbacks – Mark Brunell; Assistant quarterbacks – J. T. Barrett; Wide receivers – Antwaan Randle El; Assistant wide receivers – Seth Ryan; Tight ends – Steve Heiden; Offensive line – Hank Fraley; Assistant offensive line – Steve Oliver; Senior offensive assistant – Jim Hostler	Defensive coaches: Defensive coordinator – Aaron Glenn; Defensive line – John Scott Jr.; Assistant defensive line – Cameron Davis; Linebackers – Kelvin Sheppard; Assistant linebackers – Shaun Dion Hamilton; Defensive backs – Brian Duker; Cornerbacks – Dré Bly; Defensive assistant/outside linebackers – David Corrao; Defensive quality control – Wayne Blair; Senior defensive assistant – John Fox; WCF minority coaching assistant/defensive quality control – Dré Thompson; Special teams coaches: Special teams coordinator – Dave Fipp; Assistant special teams – Jett Modkins; Strength and conditioning: Director of sports performance – Mike Clark; Director of sports science – Jill Costanza; Head strength & conditioning – Josh Schuler; Assistant strength & conditioning – Morris Henry

== Final roster ==
2023 Detroit Lions roster
Quarterbacks (QB): 10 Teddy Bridgewater; 16 Jared Goff; 12 Hendon Hooker; Running backs (RB): 26 Jahmyr Gibbs; 5 David Montgomery; 13 Craig Reynolds; Wide receivers (WR): 80 Antoine Green; 19 Donovan Peoples-Jones; 11 Kalif Raymond; 8 Josh Reynolds; 14 Amon-Ra St. Brown; 9 Jameson Williams; Tight ends (TE): 86 Anthony Firkser; 87 Sam LaPorta	Offensive linemen (OL): 74 Kayode Awosika G; 68 Taylor Decker T; 60 Graham Glasgow G/C; 73 Jonah Jackson G; 77 Frank Ragnow C; 58 Penei Sewell T; 70 Dan Skipper T; 75 Colby Sorsdal G/T; Defensive linemen (DL): 92 Tyson Alualu DT; 79 John Cominsky DE; 53 Charles Harris DE; 97 Aidan Hutchinson DE; 94 Benito Jones DT; 98 Brodric Martin DT; 54 Alim McNeill DT; 95 Romeo Okwara DE; 91 Levi Onwuzurike DT; 93 Josh Paschal DE	Linebackers (LB): 34 Alex Anzalone OLB; 55 Derrick Barnes MLB; 46 Jack Campbell OLB; 41 James Houston OLB; 57 Anthony Pittman MLB; 42 Jalen Reeves-Maybin OLB; 44 Malcolm Rodriguez OLB; Defensive backs (DB): 32 Brian Branch FS; 30 Khalil Dorsey CB; 2 C. J. Gardner-Johnson FS; 24 Steven Gilmore Jr. CB; 25 Will Harris CB; 31 Kerby Joseph SS; 27 Chase Lucas CB; 6 Ifeatu Melifonwu FS/SS; 1 Cameron Sutton CB; 29 Kindle Vildor CB; 21 Tracy Walker FS/SS; Special teams (ST): 17 Michael Badgley K; 3 Jack Fox P; 43 Jake McQuaide LS	Practice squad: 50 Mitchell Agude DE; 15 Maurice Alexander WR; 18 David Blough QB; 45 Jason Cabinda FB; 83 Zach Ertz TE; 66 Matt Farniok C; 84 Daurice Fountain WR; 36 Jake Funk RB; 76 Connor Galvin T; 35 Mohamed Ibrahim RB (PS/I); 33 Craig James CB; 39 Jermar Jefferson RB (PS/I); 40 Brandon Joseph SS; 85 Tom Kennedy WR; 62 Michael Niese C; 99 Julian Okwara OLB; 63 Max Pircher T (IPP); 71 Michael Schofield G; 90 Chris Smith DT; Reserve: 47 Scott Daly LS (IR); 23 Jerry Jacobs CB; 28 Bam Knight RB (IR); 82 James Mitchell TE (IR); 4 Emmanuel Moseley CB (IR); 67 Matt Nelson T (IR); -- Nate Sudfeld QB (IR); 72 Halapoulivaati Vaitai G (IR); 89 Brock Wright TE (IR); -- Shane Zylstra TE (IR); Rookies in italics 53 active, 10 reserve, 16 practice squad (3 exempt)

== Preseason ==
Week	Date	Opponent	Result	Record	Venue	Recap
1	August 11	New York Giants	W 21–16	1–0	Ford Field	Recap
2	August 19	Jacksonville Jaguars	L 7–25	1–1	Ford Field	Recap
3	August 25	at Carolina Panthers	W 26–17	2–1	Bank of America Stadium	Recap

== Regular season ==
=== Schedule ===
Week	Date	Opponent	Result	Record	Venue	Recap
1	September 7	at Kansas City Chiefs	**W** 21–20	1–0	Arrowhead Stadium	Recap
2	September 17	Seattle Seahawks	**L** 31–37 (OT)	1–1	Ford Field	Recap
3	September 24	Atlanta Falcons	**W** 20–6	2–1	Ford Field	Recap
4	September 28	at **Green Bay Packers**	**W** 34–20	3–1	Lambeau Field	Recap
5	October 8	Carolina Panthers	**W** 42–24	4–1	Ford Field	Recap
6	October 15	at Tampa Bay Buccaneers	**W** 20–6	5–1	Raymond James Stadium	Recap
7	October 22	at Baltimore Ravens	**L** 6–38	5–2	M&T Bank Stadium	Recap
8	October 30	Las Vegas Raiders	**W** 26–14	6–2	Ford Field	Recap
9	Bye					
10	November 12	at Los Angeles Chargers	**W** 41–38	7–2	SoFi Stadium	Recap
11	November 19	**Chicago Bears**	**W** 31–26	8–2	Ford Field	Recap
12	November 23	**Green Bay Packers**	**L** 22–29	8–3	Ford Field	Recap
13	December 3	at New Orleans Saints	**W** 33–28	9–3	Caesars Superdome	Recap
14	December 10	at **Chicago Bears**	**L** 13–28	9–4	Soldier Field	Recap
15	December 16	Denver Broncos	**W** 42–17	10–4	Ford Field	Recap
16	December 24	at **Minnesota Vikings**	**W** 30–24	11–4	U.S. Bank Stadium	Recap
17	December 30	at Dallas Cowboys	**L** 19–20	11–5	AT&T Stadium	Recap
18	January 7	**Minnesota Vikings**	**W** 30–20	12–5	Ford Field	Recap

Note: Intra-division opponents are in bold text.

=== Game summaries ===
==== Week 1: at Kansas City Chiefs ====
Week 1: Detroit Lions at Kansas City Chiefs – Game summary

Quarter	1	2	3	4	Total
**Lions**	7	0	7	7	**21**
Chiefs	0	14	3	3	**20**

at Arrowhead Stadium, Kansas City, Missouri

- Date: September 7
- Game time: 8:20 p.m. EDT/7:20 p.m. CDT
- Game weather: 83 °F (28 °C)
- Game attendance: 73,522
- Referee: John Hussey
- TV announcers (NBC): Mike Tirico, Cris Collinsworth and Melissa Stark
- Recap, Game Book

Game information

**First quarter**

- DET – Amon-Ra St. Brown 9-yard pass from Jared Goff (Riley Patterson kick), 2:46. Lions 7–0. **Drive: 14 plays, 91 yards, 8:04.**

**Second quarter**

- KC – Rashee Rice 1-yard pass from Patrick Mahomes (Harrison Butker kick), 11:50. Tied 7–7. **Drive: 13 plays, 75 yards, 5:56.**
- KC – Blake Bell 4-yard pass from Patrick Mahomes (Harrison Butker kick), 0:34. Chiefs 14–7. **Drive: 6 plays, 82 yards, 1:28.**

**Third quarter**

- DET – Brian Branch 50-yard interception return (Riley Patterson kick), 10:54. Tied 14–14.
- KC – Harrison Butker 35-yard field goal, 2:10. Chiefs 17–14. **Drive: 8 plays, 73 yards, 3:34.**

**Fourth quarter**

- KC – Harrison Butker 39-yard field goal, 12:11. Chiefs 20–14. **Drive: 8 plays, 47 yards, 4:55.**
- DET – David Montgomery 8-yard run (Riley Patterson kick), 7:06. Lions 21–20. **Drive: 9 plays, 75 yards, 5:05.**

**Top passers**

- DET – Jared Goff – 22/35, 253 yards, TD
- KC – Patrick Mahomes – 21/39, 226 yards, 2 TD, INT

**Top rushers**

- DET – David Montgomery – 21 rushes, 74 yards, TD
- KC – Patrick Mahomes – 6 rushes, 45 yards

**Top receivers**

- DET – Josh Reynolds – 4 receptions, 80 yards
- KC – Marquez Valdes-Scantling – 2 receptions, 48 yards

To open the regular season, the Lions visited the defending Super Bowl champion Kansas City Chiefs in the annual NFL Kickoff Game. The Lions took advantage of the Chiefs not having Travis Kelce, their star tight end, due to a knee injury sustained in their practice just two days prior to this game. The Lions started off hot, scoring in the first quarter after a nine-yard touchdown pass from Jared Goff to Amon-Ra St. Brown. The Chiefs scored 14 points in the second quarter via a one-yard touchdown pass from Patrick Mahomes to Rashee Rice and a four-yard touchdown pass from Mahomes to Blake Bell, which made the score 14–7 in favor of Kansas City at half-time. The Lions responded with a 50-yard interception return by Brian Branch in the third quarter to tie the game. The Chiefs regained the lead during a 35-yard field goal by Harrison Butker, and scored again in the fourth quarter when Butker hit 39-yard field goal. The Lions scored the final points of the game, an eight-yard touchdown run from David Montgomery, making the final score 21–20 in favor of Detroit. With the upset win, the Lions started the season 1–0 for the first time since 2017. They also won their first game at Arrowhead Stadium since 1988, which, coincidentally, was also won by a mere point.

==== Week 2: vs. Seattle Seahawks ====
Week 2: Seattle Seahawks at Detroit Lions – Game summary

Quarter	1	2	3	4	OT	Total
**Seahawks**	7	0	10	14	6	**37**
Lions	7	7	7	10	0	**31**

at Ford Field, Detroit, Michigan

- Date: September 17
- Game time: 1:00 p.m. EDT
- Game weather: None (indoor stadium)
- Game attendance: 66,434
- Referee: Alex Kemp
- TV announcers (Fox): Kevin Burkhardt, Greg Olsen, Erin Andrews and Tom Rinaldi
- Recap, Game Book

Game information

**First quarter**

- SEA – Kenneth Walker III 1-yard run (Jason Myers kick), 7:04. Seahawks 7–0. **Drive: 12 plays, 75 yards, 7:56.**
- DET – Josh Reynolds 22-yard pass from Jared Goff (Riley Patterson kick), 3:49. Tied 7–7. **Drive: 7 plays, 75 yards, 3:15.**

**Second quarter**

- DET – Kalif Raymond 36-yard pass from Jared Goff (Riley Patterson kick), 4:51. Lions 14–7. **Drive: 5 plays, 65 yards, 2:46.**

**Third quarter**

- SEA – Kenneth Walker III 3-yard run (Jason Myers kick), 14:16. Tied 14–14. **Drive: 2 plays, 23 yards, 0:38.**
- DET – David Montgomery 4-yard run (Riley Patterson kick), 9:05. Lions 21–14. **Drive: 9 plays, 75 yards, 5:11.**
- SEA – Jason Myers 25-yard field goal, 3:27. Lions 21–17. **Drive: 12 plays, 61 yards, 5:38.**

**Fourth quarter**

- SEA – Tyler Lockett 3-yard pass from Geno Smith (Jason Myers kick), 10:38. Seahawks 24–21. **Drive: 9 plays, 45 yards, 4:49.**
- SEA – Tre Brown 40-yard interception return (Jason Myers kick), 8:04. Seahawks 31–21.
- DET – Josh Reynolds 4-yard pass from Jared Goff (Riley Patterson kick), 3:08. Seahawks 31–28. **Drive: 10 plays, 75 yards, 4:56.**
- DET – Riley Patterson 38-yard field goal, 0:00. Tied 31–31. **Drive: 6 plays, 30 yards, 1:44.**

**Overtime**

- SEA – Tyler Lockett 6-yard pass from Geno Smith, 5:41. Seahawks 37–31. **Drive: 9 plays, 75 yards, 4:19.**

**Top passers**

- SEA – Geno Smith – 32/41, 328 yards, 2 TD
- DET – Jared Goff – 28/35, 323 yards, 3 TD, INT

**Top rushers**

- SEA – Kenneth Walker III – 17 rushes, 43 yards, 2 TD
- DET – David Montgomery – 16 rushes, 67 yards, TD

**Top receivers**

- SEA – DK Metcalf – 6 receptions, 75 yards
- DET – Amon-Ra St. Brown – 6 receptions, 102 yards

In week 2, for their home opener, the Lions hosted the Seattle Seahawks. The Seahawks opened the scoring in the first quarter on a Kenneth Walker III run. The Lions responded with a 22-yard touchdown pass from Jared Goff to Josh Reynolds to tie the game 7-7. The Lions scored the only points of the second quarter during a 36-yard touchdown pass from Goff to Kalif Raymond, which made the score 14–7 in favor of Detroit at halftime. The Seahawks scored 10 points in the third quarter, a three-yard touchdown run from Walker III, and a 25-yard field goal by Jason Myers. The Lions answered with a four-yard touchdown run from David Montgomery to regain the lead 21–17. The Seahawks came back in the fourth quarter via a three-yard touchdown pass from Geno Smith to Tyler Lockett and a 40-yard interception return by Tre Brown. The Lions responded with a four-yard touchdown pass from Goff to Reynolds and a 38-yard field goal by Riley Patterson as time expired in the game to force overtime 31-31. During overtime, the Seahawks scored a six-yard touchdown pass from Smith to Lockett, making the final score 37–31 in favor of Seattle. With the loss, the Lions fell to 1–1. They once again failed to beat the Seahawks, not having done so since 2012, although they would break the streak the year after.

==== Week 3: vs. Atlanta Falcons ====
Week 3: Atlanta Falcons at Detroit Lions – Game summary

Quarter	1	2	3	4	Total
Falcons	0	3	0	3	**6**
**Lions**	3	10	0	7	**20**

at Ford Field, Detroit, Michigan

- Date: September 24
- Game time: 1:00 p.m. EDT
- Game weather: None (indoor stadium)
- Game attendance: 63,803
- Referee: Carl Cheffers
- TV announcers (Fox): Adam Amin, Mark Schlereth and Kristina Pink
- Recap, Game Book

Game information

**First quarter**

- DET – Riley Patterson 37-yard field goal, 1:46. Lions 3–0. **Drive: 11 plays, 48 yards, 6:31.**

**Second quarter**

- ATL – Younghoe Koo 48-yard field goal, 11:32. Tied 3–3. **Drive: 10 plays, 45 yards, 5:14.**
- DET – Sam LaPorta 45-yard pass from Jared Goff (Riley Patterson kick), 10:05. Lions 10–3. **Drive: 5 plays, 75 yards, 1:27.**
- DET – Riley Patterson 24-yard field goal, 1:53. Lions 13–3. **Drive: 13 plays, 67 yards, 7:09.**

**Third quarter**

- No scoring plays.

**Fourth quarter**

- DET – Jared Goff 3-yard run (Riley Patterson kick), 9:50. Lions 20–3. **Drive: 7 plays, 62 yards, 3:52.**
- ATL – Younghoe Koo 24-yard field goal, 4:19. Lions 20–6. **Drive: 17 plays, 76 yards, 5:31.**

**Top passers**

- ATL – Desmond Ridder – 21/38, 201 yards
- DET – Jared Goff – 22/33, 243 yards, TD, INT

**Top rushers**

- ATL – Bijan Robinson – 10 rushes, 33 yards
- DET – Jahmyr Gibbs – 17 rushes, 80 yards

**Top receivers**

- ATL – Kyle Pitts – 5 receptions, 41 yards
- DET – Amon-Ra St. Brown – 9 receptions, 102 yards

In week 3, the Lions hosted the Atlanta Falcons. The Lions opened the scoring in the first quarter with a 37-yard field goal by Riley Patterson. The Falcons responded with a 48-yard field goal by Younghoe Koo in the second quarter to tie the game 3 to 3. The Lions scored 10 points in the quarter with a 45-yard touchdown pass from Jared Goff to Sam LaPorta and a 24-yard field goal by Patterson, which made the score 13–3 in favor of Detroit at half-time. After a scoreless third quarter, the Lions extended their lead in the fourth quarter to 20–3 in a three-yard touchdown run from Goff. The Falcons had the final score of the game, a 24-yard field goal by Koo, making the final score 20–6 in favor of Detroit. With the win, the Lions improved to 2–1.

==== Week 4: at Green Bay Packers ====
Week 4: Detroit Lions at Green Bay Packers – Game summary

Quarter	1	2	3	4	Total
**Lions**	14	13	0	7	**34**
Packers	3	0	8	9	**20**

at Lambeau Field, Green Bay, Wisconsin

- Date: September 28
- Game time: 8:15 p.m. EDT/7:15 p.m. CDT
- Game weather: Cloudy, 64 °F (18 °C)
- Game attendance: 78,052
- Referee: Alan Eck
- TV announcers (WJBK/Prime Video): Al Michaels, Kirk Herbstreit and Kaylee Hartung
- Recap, Game Book

Game information

**First quarter**

- GB – Anders Carlson 34-yard field goal, 11:59. Packers 3–0. **Drive: 4 plays, 0 yards, 1:35.**
- DET – Amon-Ra St. Brown 24-yard pass from Jared Goff (Riley Patterson kick), 8:16. Lions 7–3. **Drive: 7 plays, 75 yards, 3:43.**
- DET – David Montgomery 3-yard run (Riley Patterson kick), 2:54. Lions 14–3. **Drive: 8 plays, 55 yards, 4:16.**

**Second quarter**

- DET – Riley Patterson 33-yard field goal, 14:07. Lions 17–3. **Drive: 6 plays, 61 yards, 2:13.**
- DET – David Montgomery 2-yard run (Riley Patterson kick), 13:19. Lions 24–3. **Drive: 2 plays, 7 yards, 0:32.**
- DET – Riley Patterson 37-yard field goal, 0:34. Lions 27–3. **Drive: 12 plays, 57 yards, 5:00.**

**Third quarter**

- GB – Christian Watson 1-yard pass from Jordan Love (Jordan Love–Jayden Reed pass), 8:17. Lions 27–11. **Drive: 12 plays, 86 yards, 6:43.**

**Fourth quarter**

- GB – Jordan Love 9-yard run (run failed), 14:52. Lions 27–17. **Drive: 5 plays, 66 yards, 1:02.**
- DET – David Montgomery 1-yard run (Riley Patterson kick), 6:00. Lions 34–17. **Drive: 15 plays, 75 yards, 8:52.**
- GB – Anders Carlson 50-yard field goal, 2:52. Lions 34–20. **Drive: 4 plays, 3 yards, 0:40.**

**Top passers**

- DET – Jared Goff – 19/28, 210 yards, TD, INT
- GB – Jordan Love – 23/36, 246 yards, TD, 2 INT

**Top rushers**

- DET – David Montgomery – 32 rushes, 121 yards, 3 TD
- GB – Aaron Jones – 5 rushes, 18 yards

**Top receivers**

- DET – Josh Reynolds – 3 receptions, 69 yards
- GB – Romeo Doubs – 9 receptions, 95 yards

In week 4, the Lions visited their divisional rival, the Green Bay Packers. The Packers opened the scoring in the first quarter via a 34-yard field goal by Anders Carlson. The Lions scored 14 points via a 34-yard touchdown pass from Jared Goff to Amon-Ra St. Brown and a three-yard touchdown run from David Montgomery. The Lions scored 13 points in the second quarter via a 33-yard field goal by Riley Patterson, a two-yard touchdown run from Montgomery and a 37-yard field goal by Patterson, which made the score 27–3 in favor of Detroit at half-time. The Packers scored the only points of the third quarter via a one-yard touchdown pass from Jordan Love to Christian Watson and a two-point conversion pass from Love to Jayden Reed. The teams exchanged touchdowns in the fourth quarter, first a nine-yard touchdown run from Love for the Packers, then a one-yard touchdown run from Montgomery for the Lions. The Packers scored the final points of the game via a 50-yard field goal by Carlson, making the final score 34–20 in favor of Detroit. With the win, the Lions improved to 3–1 and extended their winning streak against the Packers to four games.

==== Week 5: vs. Carolina Panthers ====
Week 5: Carolina Panthers at Detroit Lions – Game summary

Quarter	1	2	3	4	Total
Panthers	0	10	0	14	**24**
**Lions**	14	14	0	14	**42**

at Ford Field, Detroit, Michigan

- Date: October 8
- Game time: 1:00 p.m. EDT
- Game weather: None (indoor stadium)
- Game attendance: 63,648
- Referee: Adrian Hill
- TV announcers (Fox): Chris Myers, Daryl Johnston and Pam Oliver
- Recap, Game Book

Game information

**First quarter**

- DET – David Montgomery 42-yard run (Riley Patterson kick), 9:41. Lions 7–0. **Drive: 3 plays, 81 yards, 1:17.**
- DET – Sam LaPorta 4-yard pass from Jared Goff (Riley Patterson kick), 4:53. Lions 14–0. **Drive: 5 plays, 20 yards, 2:35.**

**Second quarter**

- CAR – Tommy Tremble 1-yard pass from Bryce Young (Eddy Piñeiro kick), 12:48. Lions 14–7. **Drive: 14 plays, 75 yards, 7:05.**
- DET – Josh Reynolds 1-yard pass from Jared Goff (Riley Patterson kick), 3:50. Lions 21–7. **Drive: 10 plays, 38 yards, 6:08.**
- DET – Sam LaPorta 31-yard pass from Jared Goff (Riley Patterson kick), 3:21. Lions 28–7. **Drive: 1 play, 31 yards, 0:08.**
- CAR – Eddy Piñeiro 33-yard field goal, 0:06. Lions 28–10. **Drive: 9 plays, 53 yards, 3:15.**

**Third quarter**

- No scoring plays.

**Fourth quarter**

- DET – Jared Goff 1-yard run (Riley Patterson kick), 14:45. Lions 35–10. **Drive: 8 plays, 51 yards, 4:33.**
- CAR – D. J. Chark 18-yard pass from Bryce Young (Eddy Piñeiro kick), 11:52. Lions 35–17. **Drive: 7 plays, 75 yards, 3:06.**
- DET – Craig Reynolds 5-yard run (Riley Patterson kick), 7:27. Lions 42–17. **Drive: 7 plays, 75 yards, 4:25.**
- CAR – Adam Thielen 1-yard pass from Bryce Young (Eddy Piñeiro kick), 1:55. Lions 42–24. **Drive: 13 plays, 75 yards, 5:32.**

**Top passers**

- CAR – Bryce Young – 25/41, 247 yards, 3 TD, 2 INT
- DET – Jared Goff – 20/28, 236 yards, 3 TD

**Top rushers**

- CAR – Chuba Hubbard – 9 rushes, 35 yards
- DET – David Montgomery – 19 rushes, 109 yards, TD

**Top receivers**

- CAR – Adam Thielen – 11 receptions, 107 yards, TD
- DET – Josh Reynolds – 4 receptions, 76 yards, TD

In week 5, the Lions hosted the Carolina Panthers. The Lions scored 14 points in the first quarter via a 42-yard touchdown run from David Montgomery and a four-yard touchdown pass from Jared Goff to Sam LaPorta. In the second quarter, the Panthers responded with a one-yard touchdown pass from Bryce Young to Tommy Tremble. The Lions scored 14 points in the quarter via a one-yard touchdown pass from Goff to Josh Reynolds and a 31-yard touchdown pass from Goff to LaPorta. The Panthers scored the final points of the half via a 33-yard field goal by Eddy Piñeiro, which made the score 28–10 in favor of Detroit at half-time. After a scoreless third quarter, the Lions scored 14 points in the fourth quarter via a one-yard touchdown run from Goff and a five-yard touchdown run from Craig Reynolds. The Panthers scored 14 points in the quarter via an 18-yard touchdown pass from Young to D. J. Chark and a one-yard touchdown pass from Young to Adam Thielen, making the final score 42–24 in favor of Detroit. With the win, the Lions improved to 4–1, maintaining their spot at first place in the NFC North. This marked the first time they've won at least four of their first five games since 2011, and the fourth time in 50 seasons.

==== Week 6: at Tampa Bay Buccaneers ====
Week 6: Detroit Lions at Tampa Bay Buccaneers – Game summary

Quarter	1	2	3	4	Total
**Lions**	3	7	7	3	**20**
Buccaneers	0	3	3	0	**6**

at Raymond James Stadium, Tampa, Florida

- Date: October 15
- Game time: 4:25 p.m. EDT
- Game weather: Cloudy, 77 °F (25 °C)
- Game attendance: 65,854
- Referee: Clay Martin
- TV announcers (Fox): Adam Amin, Daryl Johnston and Pam Oliver
- Recap, Game Book

Game information

**First quarter**

- DET – Riley Patterson 30-yard field goal, 8:09. Lions 3–0. **Drive: 4 plays, 0 yards, 1:59.**

**Second quarter**

- TB – Chase McLaughlin 33-yard field goal, 7:34. Tied 3–3. **Drive: 9 plays, 43 yards, 4:24.**
- DET – Amon-Ra St. Brown 27-yard pass from Jared Goff (Riley Patterson kick), 2:39. Lions 10–3. **Drive: 8 plays, 75 yards, 4:55.**

**Third quarter**

- TB – Chase McLaughlin 36-yard field goal, 7:44. Lions 10–6. **Drive: 6 plays, 40 yards, 2:49.**
- DET – Jameson Williams 45-yard pass from Jared Goff (Riley Patterson kick), 3:19. Lions 17–6. **Drive: 9 plays, 73 yards, 4:25.**

**Fourth quarter**

- DET – Riley Patterson 36-yard field goal, 12:00. Lions 20–6. **Drive: 9 plays, 53 yards, 4:05.**

**Top passers**

- DET – Jared Goff – 30/44, 353 yards, 2 TD
- TB – Baker Mayfield – 19/37, 206 yards, INT

**Top rushers**

- DET – Craig Reynolds – 10 rushes, 15 yards
- TB – Rachaad White – 7 rushes, 26 yards

**Top receivers**

- DET – Amon-Ra St. Brown – 12 receptions, 124 yards, TD
- TB – Chris Godwin – 6 receptions, 77 yards

In week 6, the Lions visited the Tampa Bay Buccaneers. The Lions opened the scoring in the first quarter via a 30-yard field goal by Riley Patterson. The Buccaneers scored in the second quarter via a 33-yard field goal by Chase McLaughlin to tie the game. The Lions responded with a 27-yard touchdown pass from Jared Goff to Amon-Ra St. Brown, which made the score 10–3 in favor of Detroit at half-time. In the third quarter, the Buccaneers scored via a 36-yard field goal by McLaughlin. The Lions extended their lead via a 45-yard touchdown pass from Goff to Jameson Williams. The Lions scored the only points of the fourth quarter via a 36-yard field goal by Patterson, making the final score 20–6 in favor of Detroit. With the win, the Lions improved to 5–1, their first such start since 2011. They are on a 13–3 streak (dating back to last season) for the first time since the 1961–1962 seasons.

==== Week 7: at Baltimore Ravens ====
Week 7: Detroit Lions at Baltimore Ravens – Game summary

Quarter	1	2	3	4	Total
Lions	0	0	0	6	**6**
**Ravens**	14	14	7	3	**38**

at M&T Bank Stadium, Baltimore, Maryland

- Date: October 22
- Game time: 1:00 p.m. EDT
- Game weather: Partly cloudy, 62 °F (17 °C)
- Game attendance: 70,989
- Referee: Brad Rogers
- TV announcers (Fox): Kevin Burkhardt, Greg Olsen, Erin Andrews and Tom Rinaldi
- Recap, Game Book

Game information

**First quarter**

- BAL – Lamar Jackson 7-yard run (Justin Tucker kick), 10:37. Ravens 7–0. **Drive: 7 plays, 75 yards, 4:23.**
- BAL – Nelson Agholor 12-yard pass from Lamar Jackson (Justin Tucker kick), 3:11. Ravens 14–0. **Drive: 11 plays, 68 yards, 5:46.**

**Second quarter**

- BAL – Mark Andrews 11-yard pass from Lamar Jackson (Justin Tucker kick), 12:54. Ravens 21–0. **Drive: 8 plays, 92 yards, 3:57.**
- BAL – Gus Edwards 2-yard run (Justin Tucker kick), 7:45. Ravens 28–0. **Drive: 6 plays, 80 yards, 2:56.**

**Third quarter**

- BAL – Mark Andrews 8-yard pass from Lamar Jackson (Justin Tucker kick), 7:25. Ravens 35–0. **Drive: 4 plays, 94 yards, 2:06.**

**Fourth quarter**

- DET – Jahmyr Gibbs 21-yard run (pass failed), 13:59. Ravens 35–6. **Drive: 8 plays, 77 yards, 3:31.**
- BAL – Justin Tucker 32-yard field goal, 9:30. Ravens 38–6. **Drive: 7 plays, 29 yards, 4:29.**

**Top passers**

- DET – Jared Goff – 33/53, 284 yards, INT
- BAL – Lamar Jackson – 21/27, 357 yards, 3 TD

**Top rushers**

- DET – Jahmyr Gibbs – 11 rushes, 68 yards, TD
- BAL – Gus Edwards – 14 rushes, 64 yards, TD

**Top receivers**

- DET – Amon-Ra St. Brown – 13 receptions, 102 yards
- BAL – Gus Edwards – 1 reception, 80 yards

In week 7, the Lions visited the Baltimore Ravens. The Ravens scored 14 points in the first quarter via a seven-yard touchdown run from Lamar Jackson and a 12-yard touchdown pass from Jackson to Nelson Agholor. The Ravens scored 14 points in the second quarter via an 11-yard touchdown pass from Jackson to Mark Andrews and a two-yard touchdown run from Gus Edwards, which made the score 28–0 in favor of Baltimore at half-time. The Ravens extended their lead in the third quarter via an eight-yard touchdown pass from Jackson to Andrews. The Lions finally got on the board in the fourth quarter via a 21-yard touchdown run from Jahmyr Gibbs. The Ravens scored the final points of the game via a 32-yard field goal by Justin Tucker, making the final score 38–6 in favor of Baltimore. With the loss, the Lions fell to 5–2.

==== Week 8: vs. Las Vegas Raiders ====
Week 8: Las Vegas Raiders at Detroit Lions – Game summary

Quarter	1	2	3	4	Total
Raiders	0	7	7	0	**14**
**Lions**	3	13	7	3	**26**

at Ford Field, Detroit, Michigan

- Date: October 30
- Game time: 8:15 p.m. EDT
- Game weather: None (indoor stadium)
- Game attendance: 66,774
- Referee: Clete Blakeman
- TV announcers (ESPN/ABC): Joe Buck, Troy Aikman and Lisa Salters
- Recap, Game Book

Game information

**First quarter**

- DET – Riley Patterson 44-yard field goal, 7:51. Lions 3–0. **Drive: 14 plays, 54 yards, 5:06.**

**Second quarter**

- DET – Riley Patterson 31-yard field goal, 12:23. Lions 6–0. **Drive: 10 plays, 36 yards, 7:09.**
- DET – Riley Patterson 33-yard field goal, 8:08. Lions 9–0. **Drive: 7 plays, 63 yards, 3:16.**
- LV – Josh Jacobs 3-yard run (Daniel Carlson kick), 2:56. Lions 9–7. **Drive: 10 plays, 75 yards, 5:12.**
- DET – Sam LaPorta 18-yard pass from Jared Goff (Riley Patterson kick), 0:27. Lions 16–7. **Drive: 9 plays, 79 yards, 2:29.**

**Third quarter**

- LV – Marcus Peters 75-yard interception return (Daniel Carlson kick), 11:32. Lions 16–14.
- DET – Jahmyr Gibbs 27-yard run (Riley Patterson kick), 3:13. Lions 23–14. **Drive: 2 plays, 51 yards, 0:49.**

**Fourth quarter**

- DET – Riley Patterson 52-yard field goal, 9:59. Lions 26–14. **Drive: 12 plays, 55 yards, 6:08.**

**Top passers**

- LV – Jimmy Garoppolo – 10/21, 126 yards, INT
- DET – Jared Goff – 26/37, 272 yards, TD, INT

**Top rushers**

- LV – Josh Jacobs – 15 rushes, 61 yards, TD
- DET – Jahmyr Gibbs – 26 rushes, 152 yards, TD

**Top receivers**

- LV – Josh Jacobs – 2 receptions, 27 yards
- DET – Amon-Ra St. Brown – 6 receptions, 108 yards

In week 8, the Lions hosted the Las Vegas Raiders. The Lions opened the scoring in the first quarter via a 44-yard field goal by Riley Patterson. The Lions extended their lead in the second quarter via two field goals by Patterson from 31-yards, and 33-yards, respectively. The Raiders scored via a three-yard touchdown run from Josh Jacobs. The Lions scored the final points of the half via an 18-yard touchdown pass from Jared Goff to Sam LaPorta, which made the score 16–7 in favor of Detroit at half-time. The teams exchanged touchdowns in the third quarter, first a 75-yard interception return by Marcus Peters for the Raiders, then a 27-yard touchdown run from Jahmyr Gibbs for the Lions. The Lions scored the only points of the fourth quarter via a 52-yard field goal by Patterson, making the final score 26–14 in favor of Detroit. With the win, the Lions headed into their bye week at 6–2 atop the NFC North.

==== Week 10: at Los Angeles Chargers ====
Week 10: Detroit Lions at Los Angeles Chargers – Game summary

Quarter	1	2	3	4	Total
**Lions**	10	14	7	10	**41**
Chargers	3	14	7	14	**38**

at SoFi Stadium, Inglewood, California

- Date: November 12
- Game time: 4:05 p.m. EST/1:05 p.m. PST
- Game weather: Sunny, 79 °F (26 °C) (retractable roof open)
- Game attendance: 70,240
- Referee: Shawn Smith
- TV announcers (CBS): Jim Nantz, Tony Romo and Tracy Wolfson
- Recap, Game Book

Game information

**First quarter**

- DET – Riley Patterson 33-yard field goal, 10:09. Lions 3–0. **Drive: 7 plays, 61 yards, 3:23.**
- LAC – Cameron Dicker 48-yard field goal, 6:54. Tied 3–3. **Drive: 8 plays, 45 yards, 3:15.**
- DET – Jahmyr Gibbs 1-yard run (Riley Patterson kick), 4:18. Lions 10–3. **Drive: 5 plays, 75 yards, 2:36.**

**Second quarter**

- DET – Jahmyr Gibbs 1-yard run (Riley Patterson kick), 7:30. Lions 17–3. **Drive: 9 plays, 60 yards, 4:47.**
- LAC – Keenan Allen 29-yard pass from Justin Herbert (Cameron Dicker kick), 3:21. Lions 17–10. **Drive: 10 plays, 75 yards, 4:09.**
- DET – David Montgomery 75-yard run (Riley Patterson kick), 3:21. Lions 24–10. **Drive: 1 play, 75 yards, 0:14.**
- LAC – Austin Ekeler 2-yard run (Cameron Dicker kick), 0:23. Lions 24–17. **Drive: 10 plays, 75 yards, 2:44.**

**Third quarter**

- LAC – Jalen Guyton 18-yard pass from Justin Herbert (Cameron Dicker kick), 7:59. Tied 24–24. **Drive: 10 plays, 92 yards, 4:28.**
- DET – Amon-Ra St. Brown 20-yard pass from Jared Goff (Riley Patterson kick), 4:31. Lions 31–24. **Drive: 7 plays, 75 yards, 3:28.**

**Fourth quarter**

- LAC – Quentin Johnston 1-yard pass from Justin Herbert (Cameron Dicker kick), 11:30. Tied 31–31. **Drive: 16 plays, 75 yards, 8:01.**
- DET – Brock Wright 25-yard pass from Jared Goff (Riley Patterson kick), 7:30. Lions 38–31. **Drive: 7 plays, 75 yards, 4:00.**
- LAC – Keenan Allen 38-yard pass from Justin Herbert (Cameron Dicker kick), 3:34. Tied 38–38. **Drive: 7 plays, 68 yards, 3:56.**
- DET – Riley Patterson 41-yard field goal, 0:00. Lions 41–38. **Drive: 9 plays, 53 yards, 3:34.**

**Top passers**

- DET – Jared Goff – 23/33, 333 yards, 2 TD
- LAC – Justin Herbert – 27/40, 323 yards, 4 TD, INT

**Top rushers**

- DET – David Montgomery – 12 rushes, 116 yards, TD
- LAC – Austin Ekeler – 19 rushes, 67 yards, TD

**Top receivers**

- DET – Amon-Ra St. Brown – 8 receptions, 156 yards, TD
- LAC – Keenan Allen – 11 receptions, 175 yards, 2 TD

Following their bye week, in week 10, the Lions visited the Los Angeles Chargers. The Lions opened the scoring in the first quarter via a 33-yard field goal by Riley Patterson. The Chargers responded with a 48-yard field goal by Cameron Dicker to tie the game. The Lions regained the lead via a one-yard touchdown run from Jahmyr Gibbs. The Lions scored 14 points in the second quarter via a one-yard touchdown run from Gibbs and a 75-yard touchdown run from David Montgomery. Montgomery's 75-yard run was the longest touchdown run by a Lions player since an 88-yard touchdown run by Jahvid Best in 2011. The Chargers scored 14 points in the quarter via a 29-yard touchdown pass from Justin Herbert to Keenan Allen and a two-yard touchdown run from Austin Ekeler, which made the score 24–17 in favor of Detroit at half-time. The teams exchanged touchdowns in the third quarter, first an 18-yard touchdown pass from Herbert to Jalen Guyton for the Chargers, then a 20-yard touchdown pass from Jared Goff to Amon-Ra St. Brown for the Lions. The teams exchanged touchdowns in the fourth quarter, first a one-yard touchdown pass from Herbert to Quentin Johnston for the Chargers, then a 25-yard touchdown pass from Goff to Brock Wright for the Lions. The Chargers responded with a 38-yard touchdown pass from Herbert to Allen to tie the game. The Lions scored the final points of the game via a 41-yard field goal by Patterson as time expired, making the final score 41–38 in favor of Detroit. With the win, the Lions improved to 7–2.

The Lions recorded their first road win against the Chargers, ending a five-game road losing streak to them.

==== Week 11: vs. Chicago Bears ====
Week 11: Chicago Bears at Detroit Lions – Game summary

Quarter	1	2	3	4	Total
Bears	7	3	10	6	**26**
**Lions**	0	14	0	17	**31**

at Ford Field, Detroit, Michigan

- Date: November 19
- Game time: 1:00 p.m. EST
- Game weather: None (indoor stadium)
- Game attendance: 63,873
- Referee: Scott Novak
- TV announcers (Fox): Adam Amin, Mark Schlereth and Kristina Pink
- Recap, Game Book

Game information

**First quarter**

- CHI – D'Onta Foreman 1-yard run (Cairo Santos kick), 9:23. Bears 7–0. **Drive: 10 plays, 75 yards, 5:37.**

**Second quarter**

- DET – Jahmyr Gibbs 2-yard run (Riley Patterson kick), 9:23. Tied 7–7. **Drive: 8 plays, 34 yards, 3:55.**
- CHI – Cairo Santos 31-yard field goal, 1:47. Bears 10–7. **Drive: 15 plays, 62 yards, 7:36.**
- DET – Amon-Ra St. Brown 7-yard pass from Jared Goff (Riley Patterson kick), 0:11. Lions 14–10. **Drive: 10 plays, 75 yards, 1:36.**

**Third quarter**

- CHI – Cairo Santos 53-yard field goal, 6:41. Lions 14–13. **Drive: 10 plays, 50 yards, 6:21.**
- CHI – D. J. Moore 39-yard pass from Justin Fields (Cairo Santos kick), 4:41. Bears 20–14. **Drive: 3 plays, 40 yards, 1:51.**

**Fourth quarter**

- CHI – Cairo Santos 40-yard field goal, 14:12. Bears 23–14. **Drive: 7 plays, 20 yards, 3:13.**
- CHI – Cairo Santos 39-yard field goal, 4:15. Bears 26–14. **Drive: 14 plays, 70 yards, 8:45.**
- DET – Jameson Williams 32-yard pass from Jared Goff (Riley Patterson kick), 2:59. Bears 26–21. **Drive: 6 plays, 75 yards, 1:16.**
- DET – David Montgomery 1-yard run (Jared Goff–Sam LaPorta pass), 0:29. Lions 29–26. **Drive: 11 plays, 73 yards, 2:04.**
- DET – Justin Fields forced fumble out of bounds by Aidan Hutchinson for a safety, 0:22. Lions 31–26.

**Top passers**

- CHI – Justin Fields – 16/23, 169 yards, TD
- DET – Jared Goff – 23/35, 236 yards, 2 TD, 3 INT

**Top rushers**

- CHI – Justin Fields – 18 rushes, 104 yards
- DET – David Montgomery – 12 rushes, 76 yards, TD

**Top receivers**

- CHI – D. J. Moore – 7 receptions, 96 yards, TD
- DET – Amon-Ra St. Brown – 8 receptions, 77 yards, TD

In week 11, the Lions hosted their divisional rival, the Chicago Bears. The Bears opened the scoring in the first quarter via a one-yard touchdown run from D'Onta Foreman. In the second quarter, the Lions tied the game via a two-yard touchdown run from Jahmyr Gibbs. The Bears responded with a 31-yard field goal by Cairo Santos to regain the lead. The Lions scored the final points of the half via a seven-yard touchdown pass from Jared Goff to Amon-Ra St. Brown, which made the score 14–10 in favor of Detroit at half-time. The Bears scored 10 points in the third quarter via a 53-yard field goal by Santos and a 39-yard touchdown pass from Justin Fields to D. J. Moore. The Bears extended their lead in the fourth quarter via two field goals by Santos from 40-yards, and 39-yards, respectively. The Lions responded with 17 unanswered points in the final three minutes of the quarter. They scored first via a 32-yard touchdown pass from Goff to Jameson Williams. After the defense forced Chicago into a three-and-out, the Lions scored again on a one-yard touchdown run from David Montgomery and a two-point conversion pass from Goff to Sam LaPorta. On the Bears' next possession, a fumble forced by Aidan Hutchinson led to a safety, making the final score 31–26 in favor of Detroit. Detroit won despite the fact that Chicago had a win probability of 98.8% (according to ESPN) with four minutes remaining in the game. With the win, the Lions improved to 8–2 on the season, their best record through the first ten games since 1962.

==== Week 12: vs. Green Bay Packers ====
Week 12: Green Bay Packers at Detroit Lions – Game summary

Quarter	1	2	3	4	Total
**Packers**	20	3	6	0	**29**
Lions	6	0	8	8	**22**

at Ford Field, Detroit, Michigan

- Date: November 23
- Game time: 12:30 p.m. EST
- Game weather: None (indoor stadium)
- Game attendance: 66,476
- Referee: Carl Cheffers
- TV announcers (Fox): Kevin Burkhardt, Greg Olsen, Erin Andrews and Tom Rinaldi
- Recap, Game Book

Game information

**First quarter**

- GB – Jayden Reed 10-yard pass from Jordan Love (Anders Carlson kick), 12:16. Packers 7–0. **Drive: 5 plays, 75 yards, 2:44.**
- DET – Sam LaPorta 7-yard pass from Jared Goff (kick failed), 8:30. Packers 7–6. **Drive: 7 plays, 73 yards, 3:46.**
- GB – Tucker Kraft 9-yard pass from Jordan Love (Anders Carlson kick), 3:08. Packers 14–6. **Drive: 10 plays, 75 yards, 5:22.**
- GB – Jonathan Owens 27-yard fumble return (kick failed), 2:12. Packers 20–6.

**Second quarter**

- GB – Anders Carlson 43-yard field goal, 5:56. Packers 23–6. **Drive: 9 plays, 62 yards, 4:42.**

**Third quarter**

- DET – David Montgomery 6-yard run (David Montgomery run), 11:46. Packers 23–14. **Drive: 7 plays, 72 yards, 3:14.**
- GB – Christian Watson 16-yard pass from Jordan Love (pass failed), 3:30. Packers 29–14. **Drive: 3 plays, 23 yards, 1:57.**

**Fourth quarter**

- DET – Josh Reynolds 12-yard pass from Jared Goff (Jared Goff–Sam LaPorta pass), 0:41. Packers 29–22. **Drive: 12 plays, 91 yards, 2:05.**

**Top passers**

- GB – Jordan Love – 22/32, 268 yards, 3 TD
- DET – Jared Goff – 29/44, 332 yards, 2 TD

**Top rushers**

- GB – A. J. Dillon – 14 rushes, 43 yards
- DET – David Montgomery – 15 rushes, 71 yards, TD

**Top receivers**

- GB – Christian Watson – 5 receptions, 94 yards, TD
- DET – Amon-Ra St. Brown – 9 receptions, 95 yards

For their annual Thanksgiving Day game, the Lions hosted their divisional rival, the Green Bay Packers, in a rematch of week 4. The Packers scored 20 points in the first quarter via a 10-yard touchdown pass from Jordan Love to Jayden Reed, a nine-yard touchdown pass from Love to Tucker Kraft and a 27-yard fumble return by Jonathan Owens. The Lions scored six points in the quarter via a seven-yard touchdown pass from Jared Goff to Sam LaPorta. The Packers scored the only points of the second quarter via a 43-yard field goal by Anders Carlson, which made the score 23–6 in favor of Green Bay at half-time. The teams exchanged touchdowns in the third quarter, first a six-yard touchdown run from David Montgomery and a two-point conversion run by Montgomery for the Lions, then a 16-yard touchdown pass from Love to Christian Watson. The Lions scored the only points of the fourth quarter with 41 seconds remaining in the game via a 12-yard touchdown pass from Goff to Josh Reynolds, and a two-point conversion pass from Goff to LaPorta, making the final score 29–22 in favor of Green Bay. With the upset loss, the Lions fell to 8–3.

==== Week 13: at New Orleans Saints ====
Week 13: Detroit Lions at New Orleans Saints – Game summary

Quarter	1	2	3	4	Total
**Lions**	21	3	3	6	**33**
Saints	0	7	14	7	**28**

at Caesars Superdome, New Orleans, Louisiana

- Date: December 3
- Game time: 1:00 p.m. EST/12:00 p.m. CST
- Game weather: None (indoor stadium)
- Game attendance: 70,003
- Referee: Clay Martin
- TV announcers (Fox): Joe Davis, Daryl Johnston and Pam Oliver
- Recap, Game Book

Game information

**First quarter**

- DET – David Montgomery 2-yard run (Riley Patterson kick), 11:15. Lions 7–0. **Drive: 7 plays, 80 yards, 3:45.**
- DET – Sam LaPorta 13-yard pass from Jared Goff (Riley Patterson kick), 10:24. Lions 14–0. **Drive: 3 plays, 17 yards, 0:40.**
- DET – Amon-Ra St. Brown 25-yard pass from Jared Goff (Riley Patterson kick), 8:15. Lions 21–0. **Drive: 3 plays, 54 yards, 1:19.**

**Second quarter**

- NO – Jimmy Graham 6-yard pass from Derek Carr (Blake Grupe kick), 9:08. Lions 21–7. **Drive: 13 plays, 84 yards, 6:39.**
- DET – Riley Patterson 26-yard field goal, 0:08. Lions 24–7. **Drive: 12 plays, 62 yards, 5:16.**

**Third quarter**

- NO – Alvin Kamara 2-yard run (Blake Grupe kick), 10:04. Lions 24–14. **Drive: 10 plays, 75 yards, 4:56.**
- NO – Taysom Hill 1-yard run (Blake Grupe kick), 4:34. Lions 24–21. **Drive: 7 plays, 62 yards, 3:37.**
- DET – Riley Patterson 32-yard field goal, 0:00. Lions 27–21. **Drive: 7 plays, 65 yards, 4:34.**

**Fourth quarter**

- DET – Jameson Williams 19-yard run (pass failed), 14:07. Lions 33–21. **Drive: 2 plays, 26 yards, 0:49.**
- NO – Alvin Kamara 1-yard run (Blake Grupe kick), 7:30. Lions 33–28. **Drive: 12 plays, 75 yards, 6:37.**

**Top passers**

- DET – Jared Goff – 16/25, 213 yards, 2 TD
- NO – Derek Carr – 17/22, 226 yards, TD, INT

**Top rushers**

- DET – Jahmyr Gibbs – 8 rushes, 60 yards
- NO – Taysom Hill – 13 rushes, 59 yards, TD

**Top receivers**

- DET – Sam LaPorta – 9 receptions, 140 yards, TD
- NO – Chris Olave – 5 receptions, 119 yards

In week 13, the Lions visited the New Orleans Saints. The Lions scored 21 points in the first quarter via a two-yard touchdown run from David Montgomery, a 13-yard touchdown pass from Jared Goff to Sam LaPorta and a 25-yard touchdown pass from Goff to Amon-Ra St. Brown. The Saints got on the board in the second quarter via a six-yard touchdown pass from Derek Carr to Jimmy Graham. The Lions scored the final points of the half via a 26-yard field goal by Riley Patterson, which made the score 24–7 in favor of Detroit at half-time. The Saints scored 14 points in the third quarter via a two-yard touchdown run from Alvin Kamara and a one-yard touchdown run from Taysom Hill, reducing the Lions' lead to three points. The Lions responded with a 32-yard field goal by Patterson as time expired in the third quarter. The Lions extended their lead in the fourth quarter via a 19-yard touchdown run from Jameson Williams. The Saints scored the final points of the game via a one-yard touchdown run from Kamara, making the final score 33–28 in favor of Detroit. With the win, the Lions improved to 9–3.

==== Week 14: at Chicago Bears ====
Week 14: Detroit Lions at Chicago Bears – Game summary

Quarter	1	2	3	4	Total
Lions	0	13	0	0	**13**
**Bears**	10	0	9	9	**28**

at Soldier Field, Chicago, Illinois

- Date: December 10
- Game time: 1:00 p.m. EST/12:00 p.m. CST
- Game weather: Cloudy, 36 °F (2 °C)
- Game attendance: 62,185
- Referee: Tra Blake
- TV announcers (Fox): Adam Amin, Mark Schlereth and Kristina Pink
- Recap, Game Book

Game information

**First quarter**

- CHI – D. J. Moore 16-yard run (Cairo Santos kick), 10:17. Bears 7–0. **Drive: 8 plays, 69 yards, 4:43.**
- CHI – Cairo Santos 46-yard field goal, 1:22. Bears 10–0. **Drive: 10 plays, 63 yards, 5:12.**

**Second quarter**

- DET – Jahmyr Gibbs 12-yard run (kick failed), 6:59. Bears 10–6. **Drive: 9 plays, 61 yards, 4:40.**
- DET – Josh Reynolds 8-yard pass from Jared Goff (Riley Patterson kick), 0:26. Lions 13–10. **Drive: 11 plays, 53 yards, 4:49.**

**Third quarter**

- CHI – Cairo Santos 25-yard field goal, 8:38. Tied 13–13. **Drive: 12 plays, 65 yards, 5:20.**
- CHI – D. J. Moore 38-yard pass from Justin Fields (kick failed), 1:36. Bears 19–13. **Drive: 7 plays, 50 yards, 2:30.**

**Fourth quarter**

- CHI – Justin Fields 11-yard run (pass failed), 14:12. Bears 25–13. **Drive: 5 plays, 29 yards, 1:48.**
- CHI – Cairo Santos 28-yard field goal, 9:20. Bears 28–13. **Drive: 7 plays, 20 yards, 2:53.**

**Top passers**

- DET – Jared Goff – 20/35, 161 yards, TD, 2 INT
- CHI – Justin Fields – 19/33, 223 yards, TD

**Top rushers**

- DET – Jahmyr Gibbs – 11 rushes, 66 yards, TD
- CHI – Justin Fields – 12 rushes, 58 yards, TD

**Top receivers**

- DET – Josh Reynolds – 3 receptions, 44 yards, TD
- CHI – D. J. Moore – 6 receptions, 68 yards, TD

In week 14, the Lions visited their divisional rival, the Chicago Bears, in a rematch of week 11. The Bears scored 10 points in the first quarter via a 16-yard touchdown run from D. J. Moore and a 46-yard field goal by Cairo Santos. The Lions scored 13 points in the second quarter via a 12-yard touchdown run from Jahmyr Gibbs and an eight-yard touchdown pass from Jared Goff to Josh Reynolds, which made the score 13–10 in favor of Detroit at half-time. The Lions were held scoreless in the second half. The Bears scored nine points in the third quarter via a 25-yard field goal by Santos and a 38-yard touchdown pass from Justin Fields to Moore to regain the lead. The Bears scored nine points in the fourth quarter via an 11-yard touchdown run from Fields and a 28-yard field goal by Santos, making the final score 28–13 in favor of Chicago. With the loss, the Lions dropped to 9–4 on the season.

==== Week 15: vs. Denver Broncos ====
Week 15: Denver Broncos at Detroit Lions – Game summary

Quarter	1	2	3	4	Total
Broncos	0	0	10	7	**17**
**Lions**	0	21	7	14	**42**

at Ford Field, Detroit, Michigan

- Date: December 16
- Game time: 8:15 p.m. EST
- Game weather: None (indoor stadium)
- Game attendance: 64,560
- Referee: John Hussey
- TV announcers (WJBK/NFLN): Kevin Harlan, Trent Green and Melanie Collins
- Recap, Game Book

Game information

**First quarter**

- No scoring plays.

**Second quarter**

- DET – Sam LaPorta 19-yard pass from Jared Goff (Michael Badgley kick), 12:31. Lions 7–0. **Drive: 8 plays, 80 yards, 4:07.**
- DET – Jahmyr Gibbs 9-yard pass from Jared Goff (Michael Badgley kick), 8:15. Lions 14–0. **Drive: 6 plays, 61 yards, 2:43.**
- DET – Amon-Ra St. Brown 15-yard pass from Jared Goff (Michael Badgley kick), 0:19. Lions 21–0. **Drive: 11 plays, 81 yards, 4:02.**

**Third quarter**

- DEN – Lil'Jordan Humphrey 3-yard pass from Russell Wilson (Wil Lutz kick), 10:41. Lions 21–7. **Drive: 10 plays, 75 yards, 4:26.**
- DET – Sam LaPorta 3-yard pass from Jared Goff (Michael Badgley kick), 7:01. Lions 28–7. **Drive: 8 plays, 75 yards, 3:33.**
- DEN – Wil Lutz 23-yard field goal, 0:43. Lions 28–10. **Drive: 12 plays, 70 yards, 6:18.**

**Fourth quarter**

- DET – Jahmyr Gibbs 12-yard run (Michael Badgley kick), 12:12. Lions 35–10. **Drive: 6 plays, 75 yards, 3:31.**
- DEN – Russell Wilson 1-yard run (Wil Lutz kick), 6:28. Lions 35–17. **Drive: 8 plays, 62 yards, 2:50.**
- DET – Sam LaPorta 10-yard pass from Jared Goff (Michael Badgley kick), 2:21. Lions 42–17. **Drive: 8 plays, 44 yards, 4:07.**

**Top passers**

- DEN – Russell Wilson – 18/32, 223 yards, TD
- DET – Jared Goff – 24/34, 278 yards, 5 TD

**Top rushers**

- DEN – Samaje Perine – 6 rushes, 37 yards
- DET – Jahmyr Gibbs – 11 rushes, 100 yards, TD

**Top receivers**

- DEN – Jerry Jeudy – 3 receptions, 74 yards
- DET – Amon-Ra St. Brown – 7 receptions, 112 yards, TD

In week 15, the Lions hosted the Denver Broncos. After a scoreless first quarter, the Lions scored 21 points in the second quarter via a 19-yard touchdown pass from Jared Goff to Sam LaPorta, a nine-yard touchdown pass from Goff to Jahmyr Gibbs and a 15-yard touchdown pass from Goff to Amon-Ra St. Brown, which made the score 21–0 in favor of Detroit at half-time. The Broncos scored ten points in the third quarter via a three-yard touchdown pass from Russell Wilson to Lil'Jordan Humphrey and a 23-yard field goal by Wil Lutz. The Lions extended their lead via a three-yard touchdown pass from Goff to LaPorta. The teams exchanged touchdowns in the fourth quarter, first a 12-yard touchdown run from Gibbs for the Lions, then a one-yard touchdown run from Wilson for the Broncos. The Lions scored the final points of the game via a 10-yard touchdown pass from Goff to LaPorta, making the final score 42–17 in favor of Detroit. Goff tied a career-high with five passing touchdowns in the game. With the win, the Lions improved to 10–4 on the season, their first 10 win season since 2014.

==== Week 16: at Minnesota Vikings ====
Week 16: Detroit Lions at Minnesota Vikings – Game summary

Quarter	1	2	3	4	Total
**Lions**	7	10	6	7	**30**
Vikings	7	7	7	3	**24**

at U.S. Bank Stadium, Minneapolis, Minnesota

- Date: December 24
- Game time: 1:00 p.m. EST/12:00 p.m. CST
- Game weather: None (indoor stadium)
- Game attendance: 66,932
- Referee: Land Clark
- TV announcers (Fox): Kenny Albert, Jonathan Vilma and Shannon Spake
- Recap, Game Book

Game information

**First quarter**

- DET – David Montgomery 1-yard run (Michael Badgley kick), 7:13. Lions 7–0. **Drive: 14 plays, 75 yards, 7:47.**
- MIN – Ty Chandler 2-yard run (Greg Joseph kick), 2:51. Tied 7–7. **Drive: 9 plays, 75 yards, 4:22.**

**Second quarter**

- DET – Michael Badgley 37-yard field goal, 5:05. Lions 10–7. **Drive: 13 plays, 60 yards, 6:58.**
- DET – Jahmyr Gibbs 14-yard run (Michael Badgley kick), 1:48. Lions 17–7. **Drive: 3 plays, 33 yards, 0:50.**
- MIN – Justin Jefferson 26-yard pass from Nick Mullens (Greg Joseph kick), 0:29. Lions 17–14. **Drive: 6 plays, 75 yards, 1:19.**

**Third quarter**

- MIN – K. J. Osborn 6-yard pass from Nick Mullens (Greg Joseph kick), 11:56. Vikings 21–17. **Drive: 5 plays, 81 yards, 3:04.**
- DET – Amon-Ra St. Brown 1-yard pass from Jared Goff (kick failed), 4:38. Lions 23–21. **Drive: 13 plays, 75 yards, 7:18.**

**Fourth quarter**

- DET – Jahmyr Gibbs 3-yard run (Michael Badgley kick), 11:07. Lions 30–21. **Drive: 14 plays, 83 yards, 6:54.**
- MIN – Greg Joseph 26-yard field goal, 5:19. Lions 30–24. **Drive: 8 plays, 76 yards, 2:12.**

**Top passers**

- DET – Jared Goff – 30/40, 257 yards, TD
- MIN – Nick Mullens – 22/36, 411 yards, 2 TD, 4 INT

**Top rushers**

- DET – Jahmyr Gibbs – 15 rushes, 80 yards, 2 TD
- MIN – Ty Chandler – 8 rushes, 17 yards, TD

**Top receivers**

- DET – Amon-Ra St. Brown – 12 receptions, 106 yards, TD
- MIN – Justin Jefferson – 6 receptions, 141 yards, TD

In week 16, the Lions visited their divisional rival, the Minnesota Vikings on Christmas Eve. The Lions opened the scoring in the first quarter via a one-yard touchdown run from David Montgomery. The Vikings responded with a two-yard touchdown run from Ty Chandler to tie the game. The Lions scored ten points in the second quarter via a 37-yard field goal by Michael Badgley and a 14-yard touchdown run from Jahmyr Gibbs. The Vikings scored the final points of the half via a 26-yard touchdown pass from Nick Mullens to Justin Jefferson, which made the score 17–14 in favor of Detroit at half-time. In the third quarter, the Vikings took their first lead of the game via a six-yard touchdown pass from Mullens to K. J. Osborn. The Lions responded with a one-yard touchdown pass from Jared Goff to Amon-Ra St. Brown to regain the lead. The Lions extended their lead in the fourth quarter via a three-yard touchdown run from Gibbs. The Vikings scored the final points of the game via a 26-yard field goal by Greg Joseph, making the final score 30–24 in favor of Detroit. Ifeatu Melifonwu intercepted a Mullens pass at the Lions' five-yard line with 58 seconds remaining in the game that sealed the victory. This was Mullens' fourth interception of the game. With the win, the Lions improved to 11–4 on the season, and won their division for the first time since 1993.

==== Week 17: at Dallas Cowboys ====
Week 17: Detroit Lions at Dallas Cowboys – Game summary

Quarter	1	2	3	4	Total
Lions	3	0	7	9	**19**
**Cowboys**	7	0	3	10	**20**

at AT&T Stadium, Arlington, Texas

- Date: December 30
- Game time: 8:15 p.m. EST/7:15 p.m. CST
- Game weather: None (retractable roof closed)
- Game attendance: 93,731
- Referee: Brad Allen
- TV announcers (ESPN/ABC): Joe Buck, Troy Aikman, and Lisa Salters
- Recap, Game Book

Game information

**First quarter**

- DET – Michael Badgley 41-yard field goal, 10:46. Lions 3–0. **Drive: 11 plays, 52 yards, 4:14.**
- DAL – CeeDee Lamb 92-yard pass from Dak Prescott (Brandon Aubrey kick), 3:26. Cowboys 7–3. **Drive: 3 plays, 89 yards, 1:02.**

**Second quarter**

- No scoring plays.

**Third quarter**

- DET – David Montgomery 3-yard run (Michael Badgley), 4:34. Lions 10–7. **Drive: 13 plays, 74 yards, 7:26.**
- DAL – Brandon Aubrey 51-yard field goal, 0:23. Tied 10–10. **Drive: 10 plays, 42 yards, 4:11.**

**Fourth quarter**

- DET – Michael Badgley 30-yard field goal, 12:18. Lions 13–10. **Drive: 7 plays, 63 yards, 3:05.**
- DAL – Brandin Cooks 8-yard pass from Dak Prescott (Brandon Aubrey kick), 7:20. Cowboys 17–13. **Drive: 9 plays, 75 yards, 4:58.**
- DAL – Brandon Aubrey 43-yard field goal, 1:41. Cowboys 20–13. **Drive: 4 plays, 4 yards, 0:24.**
- DET – Amon-Ra St. Brown 11-yard pass from Jared Goff (pass failed), 0:23. Cowboys 20–19. **Drive: 9 plays, 75 yards, 1:18.**

**Top passers**

- DET – Jared Goff – 19/34, 271 yards, TD, 2 INT
- DAL – Dak Prescott – 26/38, 345 yards, 2 TD, INT

**Top rushers**

- DET – David Montgomery – 14 rushes, 66 yards, TD
- DAL – Tony Pollard – 16 rushes, 49 yards

**Top receivers**

- DET – Amon-Ra St. Brown – 6 receptions, 90 yards, TD
- DAL – CeeDee Lamb – 13 receptions, 227 yards, TD

In week 17, the Lions visited the Dallas Cowboys for their final road game of the regular season. The Lions opened the scoring in the first quarter via a 41-yard field goal by Michael Badgley. The Cowboys responded with a 92-yard touchdown pass from Dak Prescott to CeeDee Lamb. After a scoreless second quarter, the Cowboys led 7–3 at halftime. The Lions regained the lead in the third quarter via a three-yard touchdown run from David Montgomery. The Cowboys responded with a 51-yard field goal by Brandon Aubrey to tie the game. The Lions opened the scoring in the fourth quarter via a 30-yard field goal by Badgley to regain the lead. The Cowboys scored ten points in the quarter via an eight-yard touchdown pass from Prescott to Brandin Cooks and a 43-yard field goal by Aubrey. A momentum shift occurred when Cowboys tight end Peyton Hendershot tripped Aidan Hutchinson. Getting the ball back, the Lions scored the final points of the game via an 11-yard touchdown pass from Jared Goff to Amon-Ra St. Brown with 23 seconds left in the game. The Lions then attempted a two-point conversion, as Goff completed a pass to Taylor Decker to take the lead. However, Decker was incorrectly penalized for illegal touching after the referee said he failed to report as an eligible receiver, despite the fact that footage showed that he reported to the referee beforehand. The Lions attempted a two-point conversion again from the seven-yard line with Goff throwing an interception, but the Cowboys were penalized for offsides. On the final two-point conversion attempt, Goff's pass to James Mitchell was incomplete. In a last-ditch effort, the Lions attempted an onside kick but failed to recover the ball, and the Cowboys ran out the clock, securing a 20–19 victory. Following the game, the NFL downgraded Brad Allen's officiating crew out of the playoffs for their performance.

==== Week 18: vs. Minnesota Vikings ====
Week 18: Minnesota Vikings at Detroit Lions – Game summary

Quarter	1	2	3	4	Total
Vikings	0	6	7	7	**20**
**Lions**	13	0	7	10	**30**

at Ford Field, Detroit, Michigan

- Date: January 7
- Game time: 1:00 p.m. EST
- Game weather: None (indoor stadium)
- Game attendance: 63,233
- Referee: Brad Rogers
- TV announcers (Fox): Joe Davis, Daryl Johnston and Pam Oliver
- Recap, Game Book

Game information

**First quarter**

- DET – Sam LaPorta 2-yard pass from Jared Goff (Michael Badgley kick), 8:06. Lions 7–0. **Drive: 4 plays, 52 yards, 2:01.**
- DET – Jahmyr Gibbs 3-yard run (kick failed), 2:12. Lions 13–0. **Drive: 8 plays, 64 yards, 3:53.**

**Second quarter**

- MIN – Greg Joseph 39-yard field goal, 9:20. Lions 13–3. **Drive: 14 plays, 59 yards, 7:52.**
- MIN – Greg Joseph 43-yard field goal, 0:00. Lions 13–6. **Drive: 7 plays, 57 yards, 1:12.**

**Third quarter**

- DET – David Montgomery 1-yard run (Michael Badgley kick), 7:14. Lions 20–6. **Drive: 9 plays, 71 yards, 4:15.**
- MIN – Justin Jefferson 38-yard pass from Nick Mullens (Greg Joseph kick), 0:20. Lions 20–13. **Drive: 6 plays, 80 yards, 3:17.**

**Fourth quarter**

- DET – Amon-Ra St. Brown 70-yard pass from Jared Goff (Michael Badgley kick), 14:45. Lions 27–13. **Drive: 2 plays, 75 yards, 0:35.**
- MIN – Jordan Addison 42-yard pass from Nick Mullens (Greg Joseph kick), 13:22. Lions 27–20. **Drive: 3 plays, 75 yards, 1:23.**
- DET – Michael Badgley 39-yard field goal, 8:14. Lions 30–20. **Drive: 10 plays, 54 yards, 5:08.**

**Top passers**

- MIN – Nick Mullens – 30/44, 396 yards, 2 TD, 2 INT
- DET – Jared Goff – 23/32, 320 yards, 2 TD

**Top rushers**

- MIN – Ty Chandler – 12 rushes, 69 yards
- DET – David Montgomery – 10 rushes, 40 yards, TD

**Top receivers**

- MIN – Justin Jefferson – 12 receptions, 192 yards, TD
- DET – Amon-Ra St. Brown – 7 receptions, 144 yards, TD

To end the regular season, the Lions hosted their divisional rival, the Minnesota Vikings, in a rematch of week 16. The Lions scored 13 points in the first quarter via a two-yard touchdown pass from Jared Goff to Sam LaPorta and a three-yard touchdown run from Jahmyr Gibbs. The Vikings scored six points in the second quarter via two field goals by Greg Joseph from 39-yards, and 43-yards, respectively, which made the score 13–6 in favor of Detroit at half-time. The teams exchanged touchdowns in the third quarter, first a one-yard touchdown run from David Montgomery for the Lions, then a 38-yard touchdown pass from Nick Mullens to Justin Jefferson for the Vikings. The Lions extended their lead in the fourth quarter via a 70-yard touchdown pass from Goff to Amon-Ra St. Brown. The Vikings responded with a 42-yard touchdown pass from Mullens to Jordan Addison. The Lions scored the final points of the game via a 39-yard field goal by Michael Badgley. With the win, the Lions improved to 12–5 on the season, tying a single-season franchise record for wins.

=== Standings ===
==== Division ====
NFC North
	W	L	T	PCT	DIV	CONF	PF	PA	STK
^{(3)} Detroit Lions	12	5	0	.706	4–2	8–4	461	395	W1
^{(7)} Green Bay Packers	9	8	0	.529	4–2	7–5	383	350	W3
Minnesota Vikings	7	10	0	.412	2–4	6–6	344	362	L4
Chicago Bears	7	10	0	.412	2–4	6–6	360	379	L1

==== Conference ====
NFC
#	Team	Division	W	L	T	PCT	DIV	CONF	SOS	SOV	STK
**Division leaders**
1 (Note: San Francisco finished ahead of Dallas and Detroit based on conference record, claiming the No. 1 seed.)	San Francisco 49ers	West	12	5	0	.706	5–1	10–2	.509	.475	L1
2 (Note: Dallas claimed the No. 2 seed over Detroit based on head-to-head victory.)	Dallas Cowboys	East	12	5	0	.706	5–1	9–3	.446	.392	W2
3	Detroit Lions	North	12	5	0	.706	4–2	8–4	.481	.436	W1
4 (Note: Tampa Bay finished ahead of New Orleans in the NFC South based on common record. (Tampa Bay is 8–4 against Minnesota, Chicago, Detroit, Green Bay, Atlanta, Carolina, Houston, Tennessee, Jacksonville, and Indianapolis, while New Orleans is 6–6 against the same teams.))	Tampa Bay Buccaneers	South	9	8	0	.529	4–2	7–5	.481	.379	W1
**Wild cards**
5	Philadelphia Eagles	East	11	6	0	.647	4–2	7–5	.481	.476	L2
6	Los Angeles Rams	West	10	7	0	.588	5–1	8–4	.529	.453	W4
7 (Note: Green Bay and Seattle finished ahead of New Orleans based on conference record.) (Note: Green Bay finished ahead of Seattle based on strength of victory, claiming the 7th and final playoff spot.)	Green Bay Packers	North	9	8	0	.529	4–2	7–5	.474	.458	W3
**Did not qualify for the postseason**
8	Seattle Seahawks	West	9	8	0	.529	2–4	7–5	.512	.392	W1
9	New Orleans Saints	South	9	8	0	.529	4–2	6–6	.433	.340	W2
10 (Note: Minnesota finished ahead of Atlanta based on head-to-head victory. Division tie break was initially used to eliminate Chicago (see below).) (Note: Minnesota finished ahead of Chicago based on common record. (Minnesota is 5–7 against Tampa Bay, Los Angeles Chargers, Carolina, Kansas City, Green Bay, Atlanta, New Orleans, Denver, Las Vegas, and Detroit, while Chicago is 4–8 against the same teams.))	Minnesota Vikings	North	7	10	0	.412	2–4	6–6	.509	.454	L4
11 (Note: Chicago finished ahead of Atlanta based on head-to-head victory.)	Chicago Bears	North	7	10	0	.412	2–4	6–6	.464	.370	L1
12	Atlanta Falcons	South	7	10	0	.412	3–3	4–8	.429	.462	L2
13	New York Giants	East	6	11	0	.353	3–3	5–7	.512	.353	W1
14 (Note: Washington finished ahead of Arizona based on head-to-head victory.)	Washington Commanders	East	4	13	0	.235	0–6	2–10	.512	.338	L8
15	Arizona Cardinals	West	4	13	0	.235	0–6	3–9	.561	.588	L1
16	Carolina Panthers	South	2	15	0	.118	1–5	1–11	.522	.500	L3
**Tiebreakers** (Note: When breaking ties for three or more teams under the NFL's rules, they are first broken within divisions, then comparing only the highest-ranked remaining team from each division.)

== Postseason ==
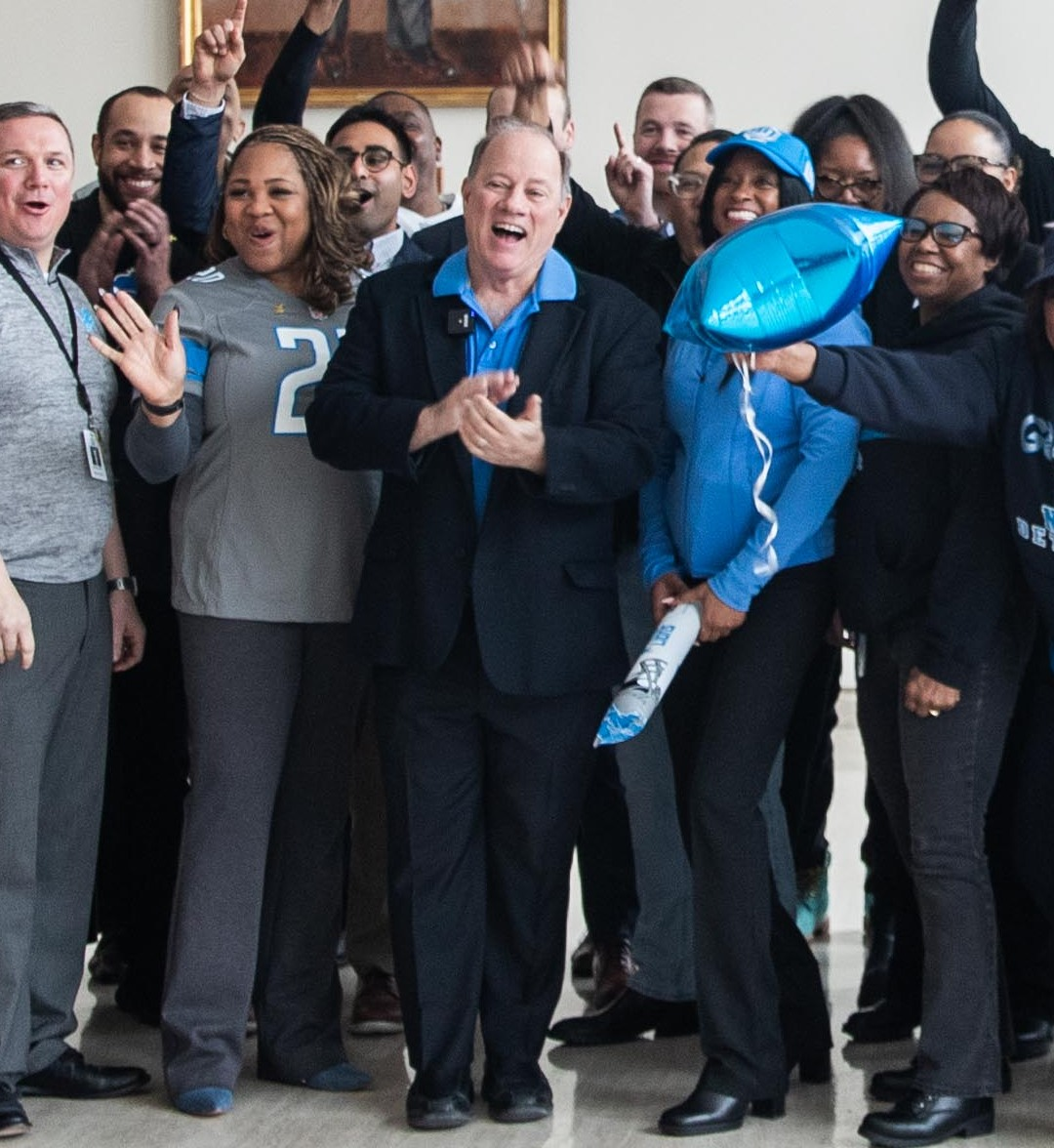
Detroit Mayor Mike Duggan celebrates the Lions' NFC Division Playoffs victory alongside staffers

=== Schedule ===
Round	Date	Opponent (seed)	Result	Record	Venue	Recap
Wild Card	January 14	Los Angeles Rams (6)	W 24–23	1–0	Ford Field	Recap
Divisional	January 21	Tampa Bay Buccaneers (4)	W 31–23	2–0	Ford Field	Recap
NFC Championship	January 28	at San Francisco 49ers (1)	L 31–34	2–1	Levi's Stadium	Recap

=== Game summaries ===
==== NFC Wild Card Playoffs: vs. (6) Los Angeles Rams ====
NFC Wild Card Playoffs: (6) Los Angeles Rams at (3) Detroit Lions – Game summary

Quarter	1	2	3	4	Total
Rams	3	14	3	3	23
Lions	14	7	3	0	24

at Ford Field, Detroit, Michigan

- Date: January 14, 2024
- Game time: 8:15 p.m. EST
- Game weather: None (indoor stadium)
- Game attendance: 66,367
- Referee: Craig Wrolstad
- TV announcers (NBC): Mike Tirico, Cris Collinsworth and Melissa Stark
- Recap, Game Book

Game information

First quarter

- DET – David Montgomery 1-yard run (Michael Badgley kick), 9:30. Lions 7–0. Drive: 10 plays, 75 yards, 5:30.
- LAR – Brett Maher 24-yard field goal, 4:26. Lions 7–3. Drive: 11 plays, 69 yards, 5:04.
- DET – Jahmyr Gibbs 10-yard run (Michael Badgley kick), 1:31. Lions 14–3. Drive: 5 plays, 75 yards, 2:55.

Second quarter

- LAR – Puka Nacua 50-yard pass from Matthew Stafford (Brett Maher kick), 13:24. Lions 14–10. Drive: 6 plays, 72 yards, 3:07.
- DET – Sam LaPorta 2-yard pass from Jared Goff (Michael Badgley kick), 7:12. Lions 21–10. Drive: 11 plays, 75 yards, 6:12.
- LAR – Tutu Atwell 38-yard pass from Matthew Stafford (Brett Maher kick), 4:02. Lions 21–17. Drive: 6 plays, 75 yards, 3:10.

Third quarter

- DET – Michael Badgley 54-yard field goal, 8:41. Lions 24–17. Drive: 9 plays, 44 yards, 4:36.
- LAR – Brett Maher 27-yard field goal, 2:33. Lions 24–20. Drive: 10 plays, 66 yards, 6:08.

Fourth quarter

- LAR – Brett Maher 29-yard field goal, 8:10. Lions 24–23. Drive: 13 plays, 79 yards, 6:43.

Top passers

- LAR – Matthew Stafford – 25/36, 367 yards, 2 TD
- DET – Jared Goff – 22/27, 277 yards, TD

Top rushers

- LAR – Kyren Williams – 13 rushes, 61 yards
- DET – David Montgomery – 14 rushes, 57 yards, TD

Top receivers

- LAR – Puka Nacua – 9 receptions, 181 yards, TD
- DET – Amon-Ra St. Brown – 7 receptions, 110 yards

To start the postseason, the Lions hosted the Los Angeles Rams, in the first ever playoff game at Ford Field. The Lions opened the scoring in the first quarter via a one-yard touchdown run from David Montgomery. The Rams responded with a 24-yard field goal by Brett Maher. The Lions extended their lead via a 10-yard touchdown run from Jahmyr Gibbs. The Rams scored 14 points in the second quarter via a 50-yard touchdown pass from Matthew Stafford to Puka Nacua and a 38-yard touchdown pass from Stafford to Tutu Atwell. The Lions responded with a two-yard touchdown pass from Jared Goff to Sam LaPorta, which made the score 21–17 in favor of Detroit at half-time. The teams exchanged field goals in the third quarter, first a 54-yard field goal by Michael Badgley for the Lions, then a 24-yard field goal by Maher for the Rams. The Rams scored the only points of the fourth quarter via a 29-yard field goal by Maher. The Lions took possession with 4:07 left in the game and were able to run out the clock, making the final score 24–23 in favor of Detroit. This was the Lions' first playoff victory since January 5, 1992.

==== NFC Divisional Playoffs: vs. (4) Tampa Bay Buccaneers ====
NFC Divisional Playoffs: (4) Tampa Bay Buccaneers at (3) Detroit Lions – Game summary

Quarter	1	2	3	4	Total
Buccaneers	3	7	7	6	23
Lions	3	7	7	14	31

at Ford Field, Detroit, Michigan

- Date: January 21, 2024
- Game time: 3:05 p.m. EST
- Game weather: None (indoor stadium)
- Game attendance: 66,201
- Referee: Bill Vinovich
- TV announcers (NBC): Mike Tirico, Cris Collinsworth, Melissa Stark and Kaylee Hartung
- Recap, Game Book

Game information

First quarter

- DET – Michael Badgley 23-yard field goal, 8:25. Lions 3–0. Drive: 8 plays, 37 yards, 2:43.
- TB – Chase McLaughlin 43-yard field goal, 4:19. Tied 3–3. Drive: 8 plays, 50 yards, 4:06.

Second quarter

- DET – Josh Reynolds 9-yard pass from Jared Goff (Michael Badgley kick), 12:33. Lions 10–3. Drive: 14 plays, 75 yards, 6:46.
- TB – Cade Otton 2-yard pass from Baker Mayfield (Chase McLaughlin kick), 0:15. Tied 10–10. Drive: 7 plays, 92 yards, 1:13.

Third quarter

- DET – Craig Reynolds 1-yard run (Michael Badgley kick), 3:48. Lions 17–10. Drive: 10 plays, 64 yards, 4:25.
- TB – Rachaad White 12-yard pass from Baker Mayfield (Chase McLaughlin kick), 0:10. Tied 17–17. Drive: 7 plays, 75 yards, 3:38.

Fourth quarter

- DET – Jahmyr Gibbs 31-yard run (Michael Badgley kick), 13:13. Lions 24–17. Drive: 5 plays, 75 yards, 1:57.
- DET – Amon-Ra St. Brown 9-yard pass from Jared Goff (Michael Badgley kick), 6:22. Lions 31–17. Drive: 10 plays, 89 yards, 6:22.
- TB – Mike Evans 16-yard pass from Baker Mayfield (two-point conversion failed), 4:37. Lions 31–23. Drive: 9 plays, 75 yards, 1:45.

Top passers

- TB – Baker Mayfield – 26/41, 349 yards, 3 TD, 2 INT
- DET – Jared Goff – 30/43, 287 yards, 2 TD

Top rushers

- TB – Rachaad White – 9 rushes, 55 yards
- DET – Jahmyr Gibbs – 9 rushes, 74 yards, TD

Top receivers

- TB – Mike Evans – 8 receptions, 141 yards, TD
- DET – Amon-Ra St. Brown – 8 receptions, 77 yards, TD

In the divisional round, the Lions hosted the Tampa Bay Buccaneers, in a rematch of week 6. The Lions opened the scoring in the first quarter via a 23-yard field goal by Michael Badgley. The Buccaneers responded with a 43-yard field goal by Chase McLaughlin to tie the game. The Lions regained the lead in the second quarter via a nine-yard touchdown pass from Jared Goff to Josh Reynolds. The Buccaneers responded with a 2-yard touchdown pass from Baker Mayfield to Cade Otton tying the score at 10–10 at half-time. The teams exchanged touchdowns in the third quarter, first a one-yard touchdown run from Craig Reynolds for the Lions, then a 12-yard touchdown pass from Mayfield to Rachaad White for the Buccaneers. The Lions scored 14 points in the fourth quarter via a 31-yard touchdown run from Jahmyr Gibbs and a nine-yard touchdown pass from Goff to Amon-Ra St. Brown. The Buccaneers responded with a 16-yard touchdown pass from Mayfield to Mike Evans and a failed two-point conversion attempt. The Buccaneers' attempted comeback failed after Mayfield's pass was intercepted by Derrick Barnes with 1:35 remaining in the game, securing the Lions' victory. With the win, the Lions advanced to the NFC Championship game for the second time in franchise history, and the first time since the 1991 season.

==== NFC Championship: at (1) San Francisco 49ers ====
NFC Championship: (3) Detroit Lions at (1) San Francisco 49ers – Game summary

Quarter	1	2	3	4	Total
Lions	14	10	0	7	31
49ers	0	7	17	10	34

at Levi's Stadium, Santa Clara, California

- Date: January 28, 2024
- Game time: 6:40 p.m. EST/3:40 p.m. PST
- Game weather: Cloudy, 69 °F (21 °C)
- Game attendance: 71,824
- Referee: Clete Blakeman
- TV announcers (Fox): Kevin Burkhardt, Greg Olsen, Erin Andrews and Tom Rinaldi
- Recap, Game Book

Game information

First quarter

- DET – Jameson Williams 42-yard run (Michael Badgley kick), 13:18. Lions 7–0. Drive: 4 plays, 75 yards, 1:42.
- DET – David Montgomery 1-yard run (Michael Badgley kick), 2:34. Lions 14–0. Drive: 11 plays, 62 yards, 5:20.

Second quarter

- SF – Christian McCaffrey 2-yard run (Jake Moody kick), 13:49. Lions 14–7. Drive: 8 plays, 75 yards, 3:45.
- DET – Jahmyr Gibbs 15-yard run (Michael Badgley kick), 5:54. Lions 21–7. Drive: 5 plays, 46 yards, 2:43.
- DET – Michael Badgley 21-yard field goal, 0:07. Lions 24–7. Drive: 17 plays, 68 yards, 4:52.

Third quarter

- SF – Jake Moody 43-yard field goal, 11:02. Lions 24–10. Drive: 9 plays, 50 yards, 3:58.
- SF – Brandon Aiyuk 6-yard pass from Brock Purdy (Jake Moody kick), 5:17. Lions 24–17. Drive: 5 plays, 72 yards, 1:41.
- SF – Christian McCaffrey 1-yard run (Jake Moody kick), 3:02. Tied 24–24. Drive: 4 plays, 24 yards, 2:07.

Fourth quarter

- SF – Jake Moody 33-yard field goal, 9:52. 49ers 27–24. Drive: 11 plays, 65 yards, 7:09.
- SF – Elijah Mitchell 3-yard run (Jake Moody kick), 3:02. 49ers 34–24. Drive: 7 plays, 70 yards, 4:30.
- DET – Jameson Williams 3-yard pass from Jared Goff (Michael Badgley kick), 0:56. 49ers 34–31. Drive: 11 plays, 75 yards, 2:06.

Top passers

- DET – Jared Goff – 25/41, 273 yards, TD,
- SF – Brock Purdy – 20/31, 267 yards, TD, INT

Top rushers

- DET – David Montgomery – 15 rushes, 93 yards, TD
- SF – Christian McCaffrey – 20 rushes, 90 yards, 2 TD

Top receivers

- DET – Sam LaPorta – 9 receptions, 97 yards
- SF – Deebo Samuel – 8 receptions, 89 yards

In the NFC Championship game, the Lions visited the San Francisco 49ers. The Lions scored 14 points in the first quarter via a 42-yard touchdown run from Jameson Williams and a one-yard touchdown run from David Montgomery. The 49ers responded in the second quarter via a two-yard touchdown run from Christian McCaffrey. The Lions added ten points in the quarter via a 15-yard touchdown run from Jahmyr Gibbs and a 21-yard field goal by Michael Badgley, which made the score 24–7 in favor of Detroit at halftime. The 49ers scored 17 points in the third quarter via a 43-yard field goal by Jake Moody, a six-yard touchdown pass from Brock Purdy to Brandon Aiyuk and a one-yard touchdown run from McCaffrey to tie the game. The 49ers scored ten points in the fourth quarter via a 33-yard field goal by Moody and a three-yard touchdown run from Elijah Mitchell to take their first lead of the game. The Lions scored the final points of the game via a three-yard touchdown pass from Jared Goff to Williams with 56 seconds remaining in the game. The Lions' attempted comeback failed after they were unable to recover an onside kick. The 49ers then ran out the clock to win, ending the Lions' season.

A major criticism the Lions faced was their decision to go for it on 4th down while in field goal range twice, particularly in Ben Johnson’s decision to conduct passing plays rather than running the ball in these two situations, and failing both times. The 49ers scored a touchdown on both of those next drives.
