= Brian Branch =

American football player (born 2001)

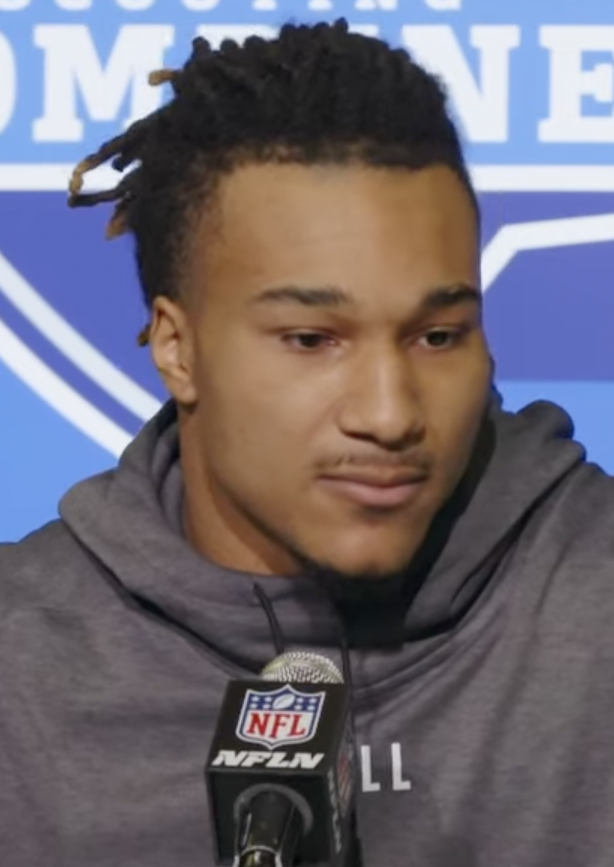
- Branch at the NFL Scouting Combine in 2023

No. 32 – Detroit Lions
- Position: Safety
- Roster status: Active

Personal information
- Born: October 22, 2001 (age 25); Fayetteville, Georgia, U.S.
- Listed height: 6 ft 0 in (1.83 m)
- Listed weight: 203 lb (92 kg)

Career information
- High school: Sandy Creek (Tyrone, Georgia)
- College: Alabama (2020–2022)
- NFL draft: 2023: 2nd round, 45th overall pick

Career history
- Detroit Lions (2023–present)

Awards and highlights
- Pro Bowl (2024); CFP national champion (2020); First-team All-American (2022); Second-team All-SEC (2022)

Career NFL statistics as of 2026
- Total tackles: 262
- Sacks: 4.5
- Forced fumbles: 3
- Fumble recoveries: 1
- Pass deflections: 39
- Interceptions: 8
- Defensive touchdowns: 1
- Stats at Pro Football Reference

Brian Amani Branch (born October 22, 2001) is an American professional football safety for the Detroit Lions of the National Football League (NFL). He played college football for the Alabama Crimson Tide, where he was an All-American and a national champion. Branch was selected by the Lions in the second round of the 2023 NFL draft. In 2024, he earned his first Pro Bowl.

== Early life ==
Branch grew up in Fayetteville, Georgia, and attended Sandy Creek High School. He was named the Georgia 5A Ironman of the Year as a senior. Branch was rated a four-star recruit and committed to play college football at Alabama over offers from Ohio State, Oklahoma, and Tennessee.

== College career ==
Branch played in 12 games during his freshman season at Alabama and made 27 tackles with seven passes defended and two interceptions. As a sophomore he made 55 tackles with five tackles for loss, one sack, and nine passes defended. Branch led the Crimson Tide with eight tackles and broke up two passes in Alabama's 27–6 win over Cincinnati in the 2021 Cotton Bowl Classic. Branch entered his junior season as one of the top safety prospects for the 2023 NFL draft. He concluded his final collegiate season in 2022 with 90 total tackles, seven passes defended, three sacks, and two interceptions. He was selected as a first-team All-American and second-team All-SEC recipient at the end of the year.

== Professional career ==
=== Pre-draft ===
External videos
- 2023 draft prospects: Brian Branch
- Brian Branch's College Highlights

Pro Football Focus had him listed as the top safety prospect (15th overall) on their big board. He was unanimously regarded as the No. 1 safety prospect in the draft by NFL draft analysts Bucky Brooks of NFL.com, Mel Kiper Jr. of ESPN, and Dane Brugler of the Athletic. NFL media analyst Daniel Jeremiah had Branch ranked as the sixth best cornerback prospect (31st overall) in the draft.

External videos
- Brian Branch runs 4.58s 40-yard dash
- 2023 combine highlights: Brian Branch

Pre-draft measurables
Height	Weight	Arm length	Hand span	Wingspan	40-yard dash	10-yard split	20-yard split	20-yard shuttle	Vertical jump	Broad jump	Bench press
5 ft 11 5/8 in (1.82 m)	190 lb (86 kg)	30 3/4 in (0.78 m)	9 1/2 in (0.24 m)	6 ft 3 1/4 in (1.91 m)	4.58 s	1.56 s	2.64 s	4.45 s	37.5 in (0.95 m)	10 ft 5 in (3.18 m)	14 reps
All values from NFL Combine/Pro Day

=== 2023 ===
The Detroit Lions selected Branch in the second round (45th overall) of the 2023 NFL draft. The Lions executed a trade with the Green Bay Packers in order to secure their ability to select Branch and agreed to send them a 2023 second-round pick (48th overall) and a fifth-round pick (159th overall) in return for their second-round pick (45th overall) used to immediately select Branch. Although he was selected 45th overall, Branch would be the first safety drafted in 2023.

External videos
- Detroit Lions select Brian Branch No. 45
- Brian Branch reacts to being picked
- Branch on being drafted No. 45 by Detroit

On July 18, 2023, the Detroit Lions signed Branch to a four–year, $8.02 million contract that includes $5.62 million guaranteed and a signing bonus of $2.83 million.

During training camp, Branch competed against C. J. Gardner-Johnson, Will Harris, Ifeatu Melifonwu, and Brady Breeze for the role as the primary backup safety and starting nickelback. Head coach Dan Campbell named Branch the starting nickelback to begin the regular season and listed him as a backup free safety, behind starting duo C. J. Gardner-Johnson and Kerby Joseph.

On September 7, 2023, Branch made his professional regular season debut and made three combined tackles (two solo), a pass deflection, and returned his first career interception from a pass attempt thrown by Patrick Mahomes to wide receiver Kadarius Toney for a 50–yard touchdown during a 21–20 win at the Kansas City Chiefs. Branch became the first Lions player to record an interception return for a touchdown in his NFL debut since Lem Barney did so in 1967. On September 19, 2023, starting free safety C. J. Gardner-Johnson was placed on injured reserve after suffering a torn pectoral in Week 2. Defensive coordinator Aaron Glenn subsequently promoted Branch to starting free safety heading into Week 3. On September 24, 2023, Branch earned his first career start and collected a season-high 11 solo tackles and made two pass deflections during a 20–9 victory against the Atlanta Falcons. In Week 4, he made seven combined tackles (five solo) before he was carted off the field due to an ankle injury as the Lions defeated the Green Bay Packers 34–20. His ankle injury subsequently sidelined him for the next two games (Weeks 5–6). On December 24, 2023, Branch recorded six combined tackles (five solo), two pass deflections, one interception, and had his first career sack on Nick Mullens during a 30–24 victory at the Minnesota Vikings. Branch started seven consecutive games at free safety (Weeks 8–15) before Ifeatu Melifonwu surpassed him on the depth chart and started the last three games. He finished his rookie campaign in 2023 with a total of 74 combined tackles (50 solo), three interceptions, 13 passes defended, one forced fumble, and a single sack in 15 games and nine starts. He received an overall grade of 78.9 from Pro Football Focus, which ranked 15th amongst all cornerbacks.

=== 2024 ===
He entered training camp slated as the starting nickelback and the primary backup safety behind projected starters Ifeatu Melifonwu and Kerby Joseph. Head coach Dan Campbell named Branch the starting strong safety to start the regular season, alongside Kerby Joseph, after Ifeatu Melifonwu was placed on injured reserve after he sustained an ankle injury in training camp.

He started in the Detroit Lions' home-opener against the Los Angeles Rams and made seven combined tackles (five solo) and a season-high three pass deflections during a 26–20 overtime victory. Branch was sidelined during the Lions' Week 4 win against the Seattle Seahawks due to a knee injury. On October 13, 2024, Branch recorded six combined tackles (five solo), two pass deflections, and intercepted two passes thrown by Dak Prescott during a 47–9 victory at the Dallas Cowboys. His performance in Week 8 earned him NFC Defensive Player of the Week. In Week 15, he collected a season-high 14 combined tackles (eight solo) and deflected a pass in the Lions' 42–48 loss to the Buffalo Bills. He finished his sophomore season in 2024 with 109 combined tackles (79 solo), 16 pass deflections, four interceptions, and a sack in 16 games and 16 starts. Branch was the only defensive player on the Detroit Lions to be voted to the 2025 Pro Bowl.

The Detroit Lions finished the 2024 NFL season first in the NFC North with a 15–2 record and clinched a playoff berth and a first round bye. On January 18, 2025, Branch started in his first postseason appearance and lead his team with 11 combined tackles (eight solo) and had a forced fumble as the Lions lost the Divisional Round 45–31 to the Washington Commanders.

=== 2025 ===
During the 2025 season, in the immediate aftermath to the conclusion of a Week 6 loss to the Kansas City Chiefs on Sunday Night Football, Branch refused to shake hands with Patrick Mahomes and when JuJu Smith-Schuster approached him, Branch proceeded to punch Smith-Schuster in the face, which subsequently began a brief brawl between the two teams. Branch stated in a post-game interview, “I got blocked in the back illegally. It was in front of the ref and the ref didn't do anything. Just stuff like that. I could’ve gotten hurt off that. I still shouldn't have done that." The following day, on October 13, 2025, the league announced he would be suspended without pay for one game. During the team's Week 14 game against the Dallas Cowboys, Branch tore his Achilles after trying to intercept a tipped pass into the endzone. Branch had surgery to repair the tendon in early December.

=== 2026 ===
Branch began the 2026 season on the PUP list due to the Achilles injury. He was activated on October 24 for their home game against the Green Bay Packers.

== NFL career statistics ==
=== Regular season ===
Year	Team	Games		Tackles					Interceptions						Fumbles			
Year	Team	GP	GS	Cmb	Solo	Ast	Sck	TFL	PD	Int	Yds	Avg	Lng	TD	FF	FR	Yds	TD
2023	DET	15	9	74	50	24	1.0	7	13	3	63	21.0	50	1	1	0	0	0
2024	DET	16	16	109	79	30	1.0	8	16	4	48	12.0	47	0	1	0	0	0
2025	DET	12	12	75	48	27	2.5	5	9	0	0	0.0	0	0	1	1	0	0
2026	DET	1	1	4	1	3	0	0	1	1	0	0.0	0	0	0	0	0	0
Career		44	38	262	178	84	4.5	20	39	8	111	13.8	50	1	3	1	0	0

=== Postseason ===
Year	Team	Games		Tackles					Interceptions						Fumbles			
Year	Team	GP	GS	Cmb	Solo	Ast	Sck	TFL	PD	Int	Yds	Avg	Lng	TD	FF	FR	Yds	TD
2023	DET	3	1	20	14	6	1.0	3	1	0	0	0.0	0	0	0	0	0	0
2024	DET	1	1	11	8	3	0.0	2	0	0	0	0.0	0	0	1	0	0	0
Career		4	2	31	22	9	1.0	5	1	0	0	0.0	0	0	1	0	0	0
