= Kerby Joseph =

American football player (born 2000)

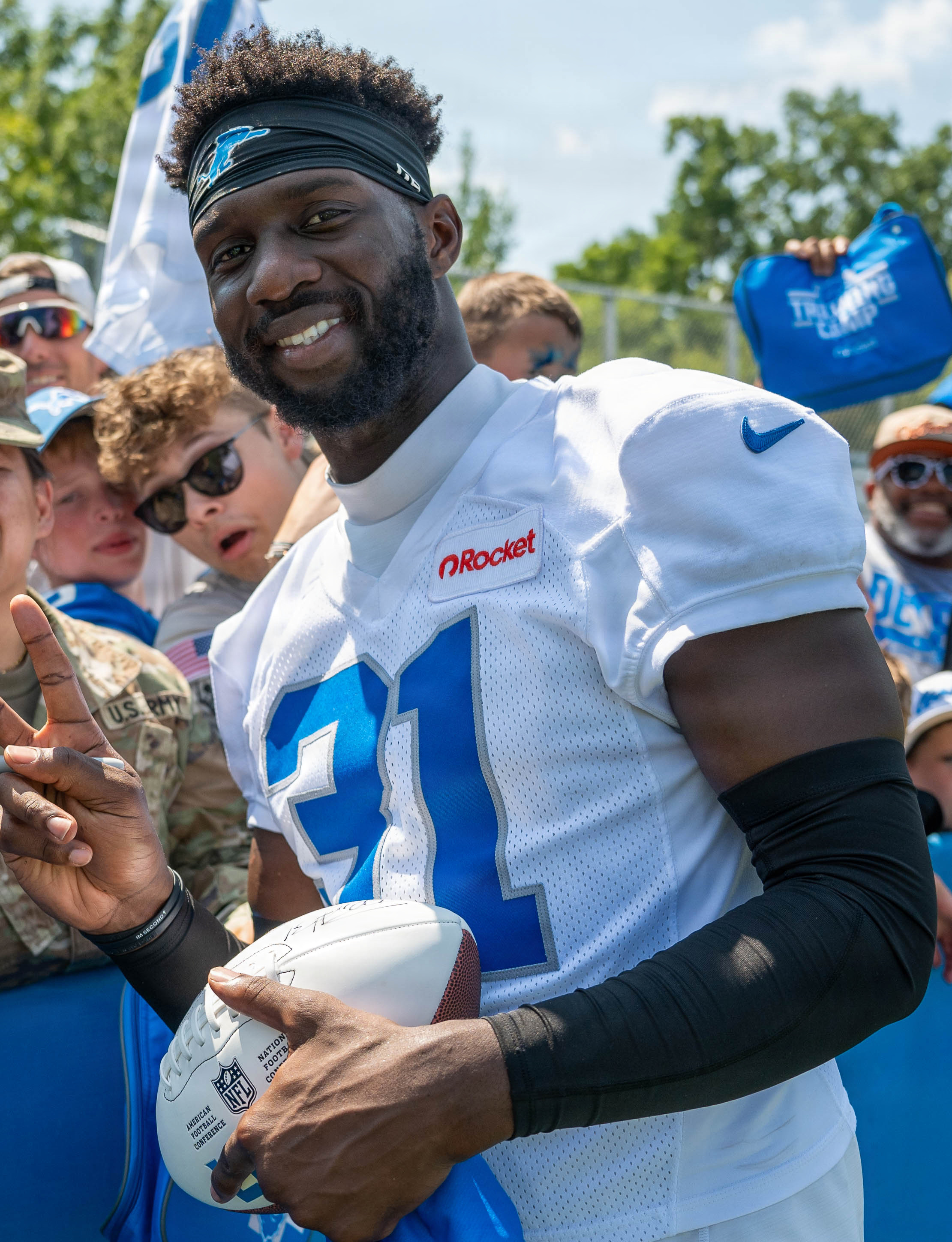
- Joseph with the Detroit Lions in 2025

No. 31 – Detroit Lions
- Position: Safety
- Roster status: Active

Personal information
- Born: November 14, 2000 (age 26); Orlando, Florida, U.S.
- Listed height: 6 ft 0 in (1.83 m)
- Listed weight: 210 lb (95 kg)

Career information
- High school: Jones (Orlando)
- College: Illinois (2018–2021)
- NFL draft: 2022: 3rd round, 97th overall pick

Career history
- Detroit Lions (2022–present)

Awards and highlights
- First-team All-Pro (2024); NFL interceptions leader (2024); Second-team All-American (2021); First-team All-Big Ten (2021)

Career NFL statistics as of 2025
- Total tackles: 265
- Forced fumbles: 2
- Fumble recoveries: 1
- Pass deflections: 35
- Interceptions: 20
- Defensive touchdowns: 1
- Stats at Pro Football Reference

Kerby Joseph (born November 14, 2000) is an American professional football safety for the Detroit Lions of the National Football League (NFL). He played college football for the Illinois Fighting Illini, where he was an All-American. Joseph was selected in the third round by the Lions in the 2022 NFL draft. In 2024, he was the NFL interceptions leader, earning first-team All-Pro honors.

== Early life ==
Joseph grew up in Orlando, Florida and attended Jones High School. As a senior, he had four interceptions and seven tackles for loss at cornerback and also caught five touchdown receptions as a wide receiver. Joseph was rated a three-star recruit and committed to play college football at Illinois over offers from Mississippi State, Syracuse, South Florida and Florida Atlantic. He is of Haitian descent.

== College career ==
Joseph played mostly as a reserve defensive back and on special teams in his first two seasons at Illinois. He was named a starter going into his junior year and recorded 19 tackles in the Illini's COVID-19-shortened 2020 season. Joseph was named first-team All-Big Ten Conference in 2021 after finishing the season with 57 tackles, one sack, and three fumble recoveries while also intercepting five passes. After the end of the season, Joseph declared that he would be entering the 2022 NFL draft. After the conclusion of his college career, Joseph was invited to play in the 2022 Senior Bowl.

== Professional career ==
=== Pre-draft ===
NFL draft analysts had a wide range of projections for Joseph, varying from as early as a late first round pick to possibly a third or fourth round pick. Dane Brugler of the Athletic projected him to be a third or fourth round pick and ranked him as the eighth best safety prospect in the draft. Cody Giddings of Bleacher Report ranked him as the 12th best safety (177th overall) in the draft. Pro Football Focus ranked him the top defensive back in the nation.

External videos
- Kerby Joseph's College Highlights

"one of the longest, rangiest-in-coverage safeties in this class. Hip-fluidity pops on film. Can really run. He'll be a playmaker in Detroit but has to trust his eyes and play with better reactionary skill."

— CBS Sports

Pre-draft measurables
Height	Weight	Arm length	Hand span	Wingspan	Vertical jump	Broad jump	Bench press
6 ft 1 in (1.85 m)	203 lb (92 kg)	33 in (0.84 m)	10 1/4 in (0.26 m)	6 ft 7 1/2 in (2.02 m)	38.5 in (0.98 m)	10 ft 3 in (3.12 m)	18 reps
All values from NFL Combine

=== 2022 ===
The Detroit Lions selected Joseph in the third round (97th overall) of the 2022 NFL draft. He was the eighth safety drafted in 2022. He was the second of five defensive backs to be drafted from Illinois' vaunted secondary that spanned from 2018 to 2022, along with Nate Hobbs (2021), Devon Witherspoon (2023), Quan Martin (2023), and Sydney Brown (2023).

External videos
- Detroit Lions select Kerby Joseph No. 97
- Kerby Joseph on being drafted by the Lions

"This is a Dan Campbell and Aaron Glenn type of player who loves to play the game. He doesn’t have great measurable, but I’ll tell you what: He can play a lot of football for Detroit. Just think about this guy's developmental arc. He didn’t start (on defense) until 2021, it was all special teams to that point, and then he went off."

— Louis Riddick (ESPN analyst)

On May 12, 2022, the Lions signed Joseph to a four–year, $5.04 million contract that includes an initial signing bonus of $849,020.

Throughout training camp, Joseph competed against Will Harris, Ifeatu Melifonwu, Brady Breeze, and C. J. Moore for a role as the primary backup safety. Head coach Dan Campbell named Tracy Walker and DeShon Elliott the starting safeties to begin the regular season, while Joseph a backup strong safety.

On September 11, 2022, Joseph made his professional regular season debut in the Detroit Lions' home-opener, but was limited to one tackle during their 35–38 loss to the Philadelphia Eagles. On September 27, 2022, the Detroit Lions placed Tracy Walker on injured reserve after suffering a torn Achilles in Week 3. Defensive coordinator Aaron Glenn subsequently named Joseph as the starting strong safety heading into Week 4 In Week 4, he earned his first career start and made three solo tackles during a 45–48 loss to the Seattle Seahawks. On November 6, 2022, Joseph recorded ten combined tackles (five solo), a season-high three pass deflections, and set a season-high with two interceptions off pass attempts by Aaron Rodgers during a 15–9 win against the Green Bay Packers. He became the first player in NFL history to intercept Aaron Rodgers three times in a season, as the Lions knocked the Packers out of playoff contention. His performance earned him the National Football Conference (NFC) Defensive Player of the Week, making him the first Lions rookie to win the award in franchise history. He finished his rookie season in 2022 with a total of 82 combined tackles (55 solo), eight pass deflections, two forced fumbles, a fumble recovery, and four interceptions in 17 games and 14 starts.

He won the Pro Bowl fan vote for NFC safeties as a rookie, but was ultimately not selected to the game due to the NFL's recent change in rules where the fan voting only constituted one third of the new selection process. Joseph was named a first-team All-Rookie by numerous publications, including The Athletic.

=== 2023 ===
Joseph entered training camp slated as the starting strong safety. Head coach Dan Campbell named Joseph and C. J. Gardner-Johnson the starting safety tandem to begin the season. He was inactive for two consecutive games (Weeks 3–4) due to a hamstring injury. In Week 7, he collected a season-high ten combined tackles (nine solo) during a 6–38 loss at the Baltimore Ravens. On December 24, 2023, Joseph made nine combined tackles (eight solo), two pass deflections, and set a season-high with two interceptions in pass attempts thrown by Nick Mullens as the Lions won 30–24 at the Minnesota Vikings. He finished his sophomore season in 2023 with a total of 82 combined tackles (69 solo), 11 pass deflections, and four interceptions while starting all 15 games he appeared in.

The Detroit Lions finished the 2023 NFL season first in the NFC North with a 12–5 record and clinched a playoff berth. On January 14, 2024, Joseph started in his first career postseason game and recorded two solo tackles and deflected a pass in the Lions' 23–24 victory against the Los Angeles Rams in the NFC Wildcard Game. The following week, the Lions defeated the Tampa Bay Buccaneers 31–23. On January 28, 2024, Joseph started in the NFC Championship Game and recorded six combined tackles (four solo) during a 31–34 loss at the San Francisco 49ers.

=== 2024 ===
He returned as the starting free safety to begin the season and was paired with strong safety Brian Branch. On September 28, 2024, Joseph collected a season-high nine combined tackles (five solo), a pass deflection, and an interception on a pass attempt by Geno Smith to Jaxon Smith-Njigba as the Lions defeated the Seattle Seahawks 42–29. On November 3, 2024, he made four solo tackles, two pass deflections, and returned an interception thrown by Jordan Love to running back Josh Jacobs for 27-yards and scored his first career touchdown during a 24–14 victory at the Green Bay Packers. In Week 17, Joseph had six combined tackles (five solo), two pass deflections, and set a season-high two interceptions on passes by Brock Purdy in the Lions 40–34 win at the San Francisco 49ers. His performance brought his interception total to nine, making him the NFL interceptions leader in 2024. He started all 17 games for the first time in his career and finished the 2024 NFL season with a total of 83 combined tackles (58 solo), 12 pass deflections, nine interceptions, and a touchdown. He received an overall grade of 91.0 from Pro Football Focus, which ranked first among all safeties in 2024. His coverage grade of 91.9 from PFF also ranked first among 170 safeties.

=== 2025 ===
On April 23, 2025, the Detroit Lions made Joseph the then highest paid safety in NFL history, signing him to a four–year, $86 million contract extension that includes $36.12 million guaranteed, $24.38 million guaranteed upon signing, and an initial signing bonus of $10.01 million. Joseph missed multiple practices in the week leading up to the team's Hall of Fame Preseason Game with an apparent knee injury, but coach Dan Campbell later stated that it was not a serious injury. He was named the Week 1 starter, and started the first six games of the season while dealing with the knee injury. Joseph then missed the next eight games after aggravating the injury before being placed on injured reserve on December 20.

=== 2026 ===
Joseph began the 2026 season on the PUP list due to a knee injury.

== NFL career statistics ==
Legend
	Led the league
**Bold**	Career high

=== Regular season ===
Year	Team	Games		Tackles					Interceptions						Fumbles			
Year	Team	GP	GS	Cmb	Solo	Ast	Sck	TFL	PD	Int	Yds	Avg	Lng	TD	FF	FR	Yds	TD
2022	DET	17	14	82	55	**27**	0.0	0	8	4	70	**17.5**	**38**	0	**2**	**1**	**6**	0
2023	DET	15	15	82	**69**	13	0.0	**1**	11	4	37	9.3	22	0	0	0	0	0
2024	DET	17	17	**83**	58	25	0.0	**1**	**12**	**9**	**99**	11.0	33	**1**	0	0	0	0
2025	DET	6	6	18	14	4	0.0	0	4	3	1	1.0	1	0	0	0	0	0
Career		55	52	265	196	69	0.0	2	35	20	207	12.2	38	1	2	1	6	0

=== Postseason ===
Year	Team	Games		Tackles					Interceptions						Fumbles			
Year	Team	GP	GS	Cmb	Solo	Ast	Sck	TFL	PD	Int	Yds	Avg	Lng	TD	FF	FR	Yds	TD
2023	DET	3	3	**10**	**8**	**2**	0.0	0	**2**	0	0	0.0	0	0	0	0	0	0
2024	DET	1	1	6	6	0	0.0	**1**	0	0	0	0.0	0	0	0	0	0	0
Career		4	4	16	14	2	0.0	1	2	0	0	0.0	0	0	0	0	0	0

== Records ==
=== Lions franchise records ===
- Most interceptions in first 3 seasons (since 1970): 17
