= Brad Cecil =

American football player (born 1999)

Profile
- Position: Center

Personal information
- Born: December 29, 1999 (age 26); Jacksonville, Florida, U.S.
- Listed height: 6 ft 3 in (1.91 m)
- Listed weight: 294 lb (133 kg)

Career information
- High school: Bartram Trail (St. Johns, Florida)
- College: South Florida (2018–2022)
- NFL draft: 2023: undrafted

Career history
- Detroit Lions (2023)*
- * Offseason or practice squad member only
- Stats at Pro Football Reference

Brad Cecil (born December 29, 1999) is an American former football center. He played college football at South Florida. He signed with the Detroit Lions as an undrafted free agent in 2023.

== Professional career ==
Pre-draft measurables
Height	Weight	Arm length	Hand span	40-yard dash	10-yard split	20-yard split	20-yard shuttle	Three-cone drill	Vertical jump	Broad jump	Bench press
6 ft 3 1/8 in (1.91 m)	294 lb (133 kg)	31 5/8 in (0.80 m)	9 5/8 in (0.24 m)	5.50 s	1.79 s	3.07 s	4.69 s	7.80 s	29.0 in (0.74 m)	9 ft 1 in (2.77 m)	24 reps
All values from Pro Day

=== Detroit Lions ===
On May 12, 2023, the Detroit Lions signed Cecil to a three-year, $2,697,500 contract as an undrafted free agent. He was waived on August 29, 2023.
