= Craig Reynolds (American football) =

American football player (born 1996)

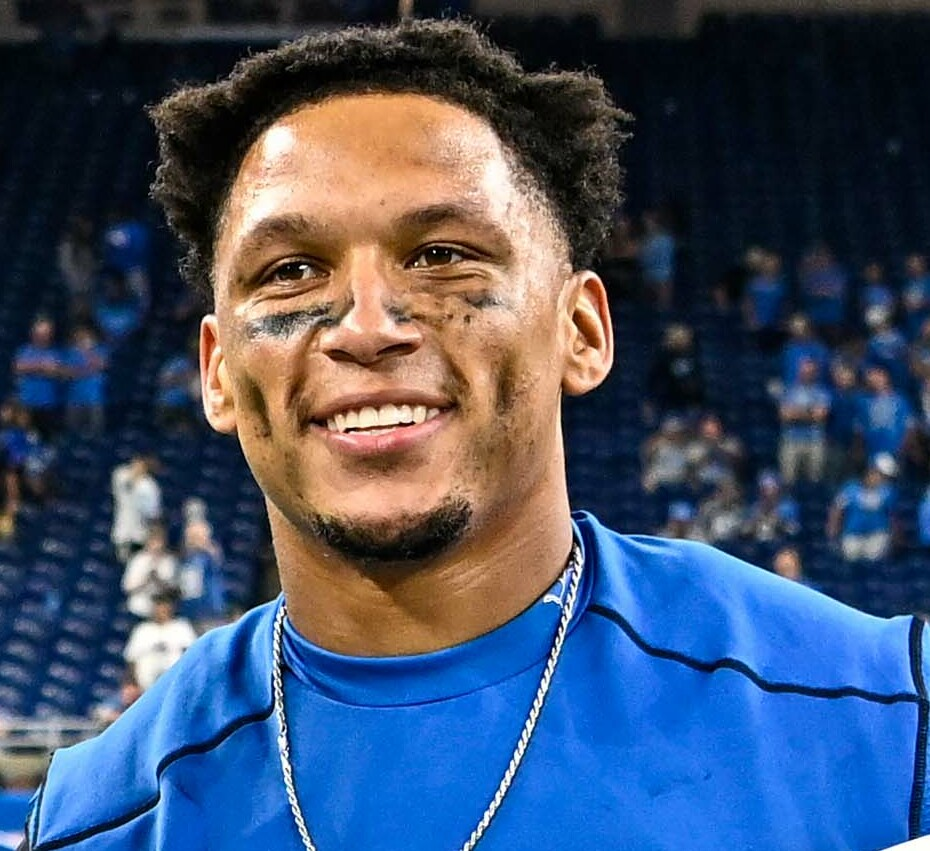
- Reynolds with the Detroit Lions in 2022

No. 24 – Washington Commanders
- Position: Running back
- Roster status: Practice squad

Personal information
- Born: June 15, 1996 (age 30); Willow Grove, Pennsylvania, U.S.
- Listed height: 5 ft 11 in (1.80 m)
- Listed weight: 225 lb (102 kg)

Career information
- High school: Abington (Abington, Pennsylvania)
- College: Kutztown (2014–2018)
- NFL draft: 2019: undrafted

Career history
- Washington Redskins (2019); Atlanta Falcons (2019–2020)*; Jacksonville Jaguars (2020); Detroit Lions (2021–2025); New England Patriots (2025)*; Washington Commanders (2026–present)
- * Offseason or practice squad member only

Awards and highlights
- 3× first-team All-PSAC East (2016–2018)

Career NFL statistics as of 2025
- Rushing yards: 658
- Rushing average: 4.3
- Rushing touchdowns: 1
- Receptions: 25
- Receiving yards: 258
- Stats at Pro Football Reference

Craig Reynolds (born June 15, 1996) is an American professional football running back for the Washington Commanders of the National Football League (NFL). Reynolds played college football for the Kutztown Golden Bears and signed with the Washington Redskins as an undrafted free agent following the 2019 NFL draft. He has also played for several other NFL teams.

== College career ==
Reynolds was a member of the Kutztown Golden Bears for five seasons, redshirting as a true freshman. As a redshirt sophomore, he was named first-team All-Pennsylvania State Athletic Conference (PSAC) East after leading the conference with 1,189 rushing yards and 14 touchdowns. Reynolds rushed 109 times for 456 yards and four touchdowns, had 29 receptions for 410 yards and five touchdowns and returned four kickoffs for 108 yards and nine punts for 153 yards and one touchdown before suffering a season-ending injury eight games into the season and was again named first-team All-PSAC East. As a redshirt senior, he was named first-team All-PSAC East for a third straight season after rushing for 823 yards and 15 touchdowns on 172 carries and catching 40 passes for 472 yards and three touchdowns while also completing a seven-yard pass for another touchdown and gaining 380 return yards. Reynolds finished his collegiate career as the school’s third all-time leading rusher with 2,650 yards and second in school history with 5,277 all-purpose yards.

== Professional career ==
Pre-draft measurables
Height	Weight	Arm length	Hand span	Wingspan	40-yard dash	10-yard split	20-yard split	20-yard shuttle	Three-cone drill	Vertical jump	Broad jump	Bench press
5 ft 9 1/2 in (1.77 m)	212 lb (96 kg)	30 in (0.76 m)	8 3/4 in (0.22 m)	6 ft 2 in (1.88 m)	4.66 s	1.58 s	2.62 s	4.25 s	6.89 s	35.0 in (0.89 m)	9 ft 11 in (3.02 m)	19 reps
All values from Pro Day

=== Washington Redskins (first stint) ===
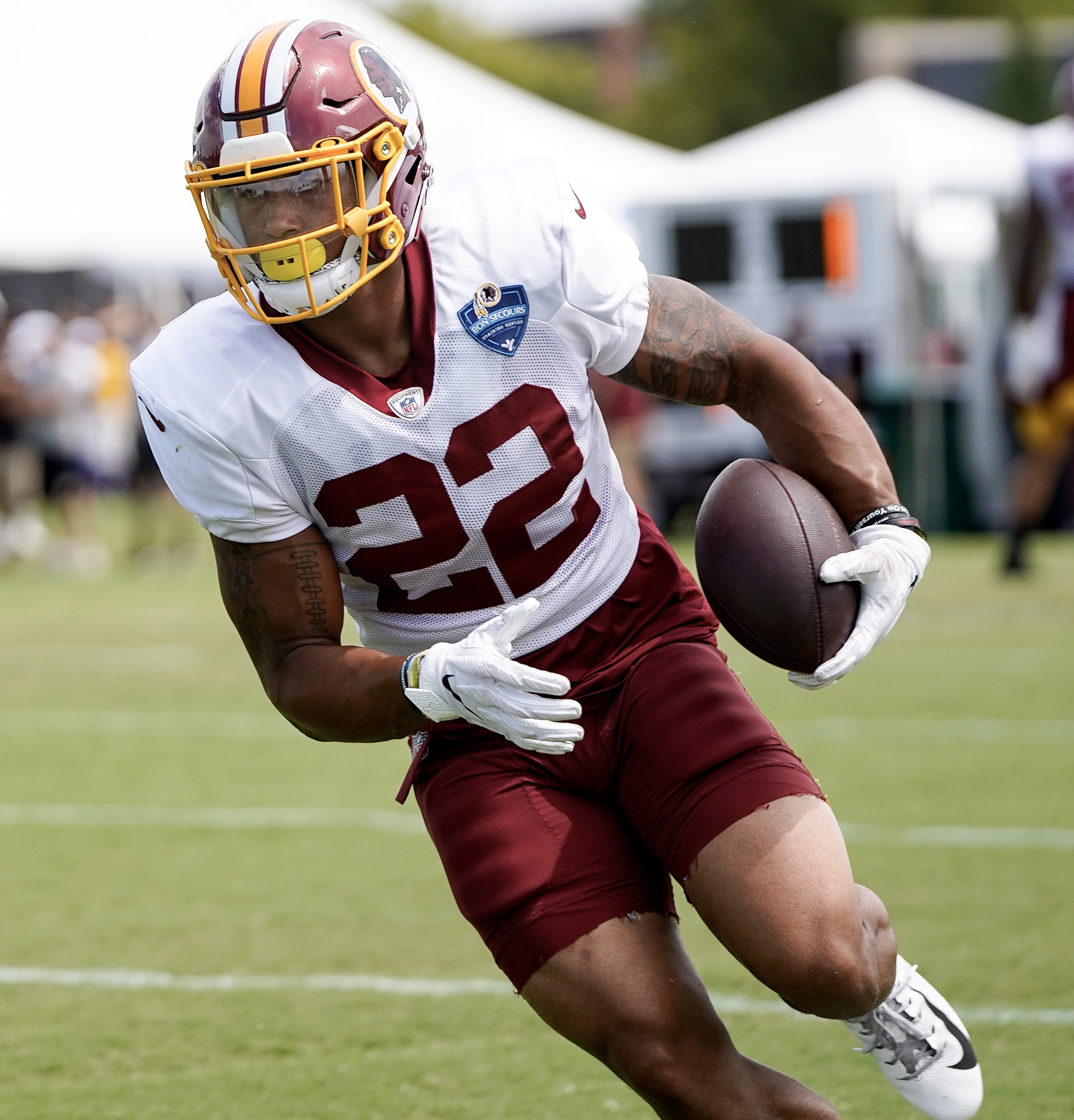
Craig Reynolds (2019)

Reynolds signed with the Washington Redskins as an undrafted free agent after participating in a rookie mini camp with the team on May 13, 2019. He was waived during final roster cuts at the end of training camp, but re-signed to the team's practice squad the following day on September 1. Reynolds was promoted to the Redskins active roster on October 19, and made his NFL debut the following day against the San Francisco 49ers, playing on special teams. On November 5, Reynolds was waived by the Redskins.

=== Atlanta Falcons ===
On November 12, 2019, Reynolds was signed to the Atlanta Falcons practice squad. On December 30, Reynolds was signed to a reserve/future contract.

On August 7, 2020, Reynolds was waived by the Falcons, but re-signed on August 27. He was waived on September 5.

=== Jacksonville Jaguars ===
On September 14, 2020, Reynolds was signed to the Jacksonville Jaguars practice squad, and was released a week later. On November 21, Reynolds was re-signed to the practice squad. He was signed to the active roster on November 28. Reynolds was waived on December 5, and re-signed to the practice squad three days later. Reynolds was elevated to the active roster on December 26 for the team's week 16 game against the Chicago Bears, and reverted to the practice squad after the game. He signed a reserve/future contract on January 4, 2021. Reynolds was waived on March 17.

=== Detroit Lions ===
On August 12, 2021, Reynolds signed with the Detroit Lions. He was waived on August 31, and re-signed to the practice squad the next day. Reynolds was elevated to the Lions' active roster before the team's Week 14 game against the Denver Broncos after running backs D'Andre Swift and Jamaal Williams were ruled out for the game. He gained 83 yards on 11 carries in a 10–38 loss. Reynolds was elevated again the following week and made his first career start in a 30–12 win over the Arizona Cardinals, rushing for 112 yards on 26 carries. The Lions signed Reynolds to their active roster on December 20, on a contract through the 2022 season.

Reynolds made the Lions final roster in 2022 as the third running back on the depth chart. He was placed on injured reserve on November 9, 2022. He was activated on December 17.

On March 13, 2023, Reynolds re-signed with the Lions.

On October 8, 2023, Reynolds scored his first career touchdown in a 42–24 win over the Carolina Panthers. The following week, in a win against the Tampa Bay Buccaneers, Reynolds threw a tremendous block to help teammate Amon-Ra St. Brown score a touchdown and give the Lions a lead they would not relinquish. Reynolds's block received widespread attention.

On November 26, 2025, Reynolds was released by the Lions.

=== New England Patriots ===
On November 28, 2025, Reynolds was signed to the New England Patriots' practice squad.

=== Washington Commanders (second stint) ===
On August 18, 2026, Reynolds signed with the Washington Commanders. He was released by the Commanders as a part of final roster cuts on August 30; he was re-signed to their practice squad the following day.

== Personal life ==
Reynolds' older brother Eric was a high school football standout and potential NFL prospect, but became addicted to drugs and has been in prison since Craig was in sixth grade. Craig calls Eric before every game.
