= 2025 Detroit Lions season =

96th season in franchise history

- Owner: Sheila Ford Hamp
- General manager: Brad Holmes
- Head coach: Dan Campbell
- Home stadium: Ford Field

Results
- Record: 9–8
- Division place: 4th NFC North
- Playoffs: Did not qualify
- All-Pros: ILB Jack Campbell (1st team); OT Penei Sewell (1st team); WR Amon-Ra St. Brown (2nd team); DE Aidan Hutchinson (2nd team)
- Pro Bowlers: 6: ILB Jack Campbell; RB Jahmyr Gibbs; QB Jared Goff; DE Aidan Hutchinson; OT Penei Sewell; WR Amon-Ra St. Brown

Uniform
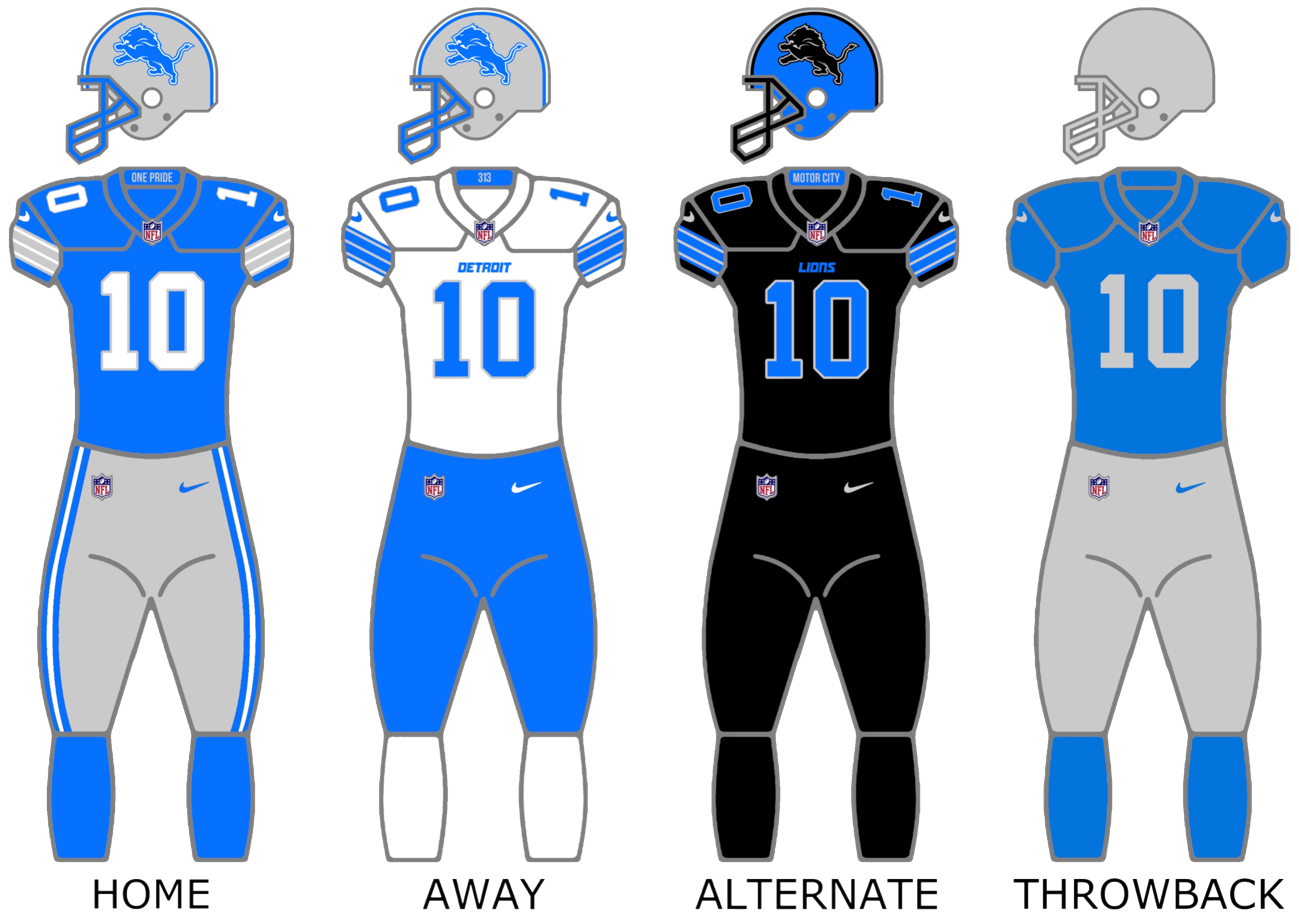

The 2025 season was the Detroit Lions' 96th in the National Football League (NFL) and their fifth under the head coach/general manager tandem of Dan Campbell and Brad Holmes.

The Lions failed to match their franchise-best 15–2 record from the previous season following a Week 9 loss at home to their division rival Minnesota Vikings. Despite entering the year as Super Bowl favorites by media experts and opening the season on a strong 7–4 start and one game behind the NFC North-leading Chicago Bears, the Lions suffered a late-season collapse and won just two out of their final six games. They were officially eliminated from playoff contention for the first time since 2022 following a Week 17 loss on Christmas Day to the Vikings; a game where they committed a season-high six turnovers after coming into the game with 8 total turnovers all season long. Frequent offensive line and secondary issues plagued the team’s year due to numerous season-ending injuries, retirements, and departures. They would also lose numerous close games this year, with 5 of their 8 losses being by just a touchdown or less, with 3 of their losses by a combined 15 points.

== Player movements ==
=== Free agents ===
Position	Player	Free agency tag	Date signed	2025 team	Source
DE	Myles Adams	RFA	March 12	Detroit Lions	
OLB	Mitchell Agude	ERFA	March 17	Detroit Lions	
G	Kayode Awosika	RFA	March 28	Detroit Lions	
K	Michael Badgley	UFA	October 7	Indianapolis Colts	
ILB	Derrick Barnes	UFA	March 10	Detroit Lions	
QB	Teddy Bridgewater	UFA	August 5	Tampa Bay Buccaneers	
DE	Marcus Davenport	UFA	March 10	Detroit Lions	
CB	Carlton Davis	UFA	March 13	New England Patriots	
CB	Khalil Dorsey	UFA	March 20	Detroit Lions	
T	Connor Galvin	ERFA			
S	Ifeatu Melifonwu	UFA	March 13	Miami Dolphins	
CB	Emmanuel Moseley	UFA			
DE	Al-Quadin Muhammad	UFA	March 19	Detroit Lions	
G	Netane Muti	UFA	January 22	Detroit Lions	
ILB	Ben Niemann	UFA	September 23	New York Jets	
C	Michael Niese	ERFA	April 23	Detroit Lions	
ILB	Trevor Nowaske	ERFA	March 13	Detroit Lions	
DT	Pat O'Connor	UFA	March 18	Detroit Lions	
DT	Levi Onwuzurike	UFA	March 13	Detroit Lions	
WR	Tim Patrick	UFA	March 14	Detroit Lions	
DT	Kyle Peko	UFA	August 11	New England Patriots	
OLB	Anthony Pittman	RFA	March 13	Detroit Lions	
RB	Craig Reynolds	RFA	March 18	Detroit Lions	
WR	Allen Robinson	UFA			
T	Dan Skipper	UFA	March 10	Detroit Lions	
ILB	Ezekiel Turner	UFA	March 10	Detroit Lions	
CB	Kindle Vildor	UFA	March 13	Tampa Bay Buccaneers	
DE	Jonah Williams	UFA	March 17	New Orleans Saints	
G	Kevin Zeitler	UFA	March 13	Tennessee Titans	
TE	Shane Zylstra	RFA	March 18	Detroit Lions	

=== Additions ===
*	= Practice Squad signings

Position	Player	Previous team	Date	Source
WR	Ronnie Bell	San Francisco 49ers	January 21	
DT	Roy Lopez	Arizona Cardinals	March 13	
CB	D.J. Reed	New York Jets	March 13	
LB	Grant Stuard	Indianapolis Colts	March 13	
QB	Kyle Allen	Pittsburgh Steelers	March 14	
TE	Kenny Yeboah	New York Jets	March 15	
CB	Rock Ya-Sin	San Francisco 49ers	March 20	
CB	Avonte Maddox	Philadelphia Eagles	March 21	
WR	Malik Taylor	New York Jets	May 12	
DE	Raequan Williams	Carolina Panthers	May 12	
LB	Zach Cunningham	Denver Broncos	May 27	
CB	Divaad Wilson	New York Giants	June 2	
OC	Trystan Colon	Arizona Cardinals	June 4	
CB	Dicaprio Bootle	Los Angeles Chargers	July 18	
RB	Jabari Small	Tennessee Titans	July 18	
CB	Nick Whiteside	St. Louis Battlehawks (UFL)	July 28	
RB	Jacob Saylors	St. Louis Battlehawks (UFL)	July 29	
OT	Justin Herron	New Orleans Saints	August 2	
CB	D.J. Miller	Michigan Panthers (UFL)	August 4	
CB	Luq Barcoo	Dallas Cowboys	August 5	
TE	Steven Stilianos	San Antonio Brahmas (UFL)	August 7	
TE	Gunnar Oakes	Michigan Panthers (UFL)	August 10	
RB	Deon Jackson	DC Defenders (UFL)	August 10	
OG	Gunner Britton	DC Defenders (UFL)	August 10	
OG	Keaton Sutherland	Birmingham Stallions (UFL)	August 10	
OG	Zack Johnson	San Francisco 49ers	August 14	
CB	Allan George	Washington Commanders	August 14	
SS	Daniel Thomas	Jacksonville Jaguars	August 27	
DE	Tyrus Wheat	Dallas Cowboys	August 27	
DT	Tyler Lacy	Jacksonville Jaguars	August 27	
DE	Andre Carter II *	Las Vegas Raiders	August 28	
S	Thomas Harper	Las Vegas Raiders	August 29	
QB	C. J. Beathard *	Jacksonville Jaguars	September 4	
OT	Devin Cochran *	Cincinnati Bengals	September 9	
LB	Monty Rice *	New England Patriots	September 9	
WR	Malik Cunningham *	Baltimore Ravens	September 16	
TE	Ross Dwelley	San Francisco 49ers	September 16	
DT	Quinton Jefferson	Buffalo Bills	September 24	
LB	Ty Summers	New York Giants	September 30	
CB	Tre Flowers *	Chicago Bears	October 1	
CB	Arthur Maulet	Houston Texans	October 9	
CB	Kendall Fuller *	Miami Dolphins	October 14	
S	Jammie Robinson	Kansas City Chiefs	October 16	
OT	Jack Conley *	New England Patriots	November 5	
OT	Chris Hubbard *	New York Giants	November 5	
TE	Anthony Firkser	Kansas City Chiefs	November 11	
TE	Giovanni Ricci *	Minnesota Vikings	November 30	
WR	Andrew Armstrong *	Minnesota Vikings	November 30	
TE	Hayden Rucci	Miami Dolphins	December 1	
S	Damontae Kazee *	Cleveland Browns	December 8	
S	Jalen Mills	Miami Dolphins	December 10	
CB	Keenan Garber *	Indianapolis Colts	December 16	

=== Trades ===
- On August 27, the Lions traded wide receiver Tim Patrick to the Jacksonville Jaguars in exchange for a sixth-round pick in the 2026 NFL draft.

=== Releases ===
==== Off-season ====
Position	Player	2025 team	Release date	Source
DE	Za'Darius Smith	Philadelphia Eagles	March 10	
LB	Jalen Reeves-Maybin	Chicago Bears	March 12	
QB	Jake Fromm		April 23	
WR	Antoine Green		April 29	
TE	Caden Prieskorn	Denver Broncos; Tampa Bay Buccaneers; Cleveland Browns	May 12	
LB	Abraham Beauplan	St. Louis Battlehawks (UFL)	May 27	

==== Training camp/preseason ====
Position	Player	2025 team	Release date	Source
CB	Gavin Holmes		June 2	
CB	Divaad Wilson		June 4	
RB	Anthony Tyus III	Seattle Seahawks; Carolina Panthers	July 17	
CB	Stantley Thomas-Oliver		July 27	
TE	Luke Deal		July 29	
DE	Raequan Williams		August 2	
RB	Kye Robichaux	Detroit Lions	August 4	
RB	Jabari Small	Detroit Lions	August 10	
OG	Keaton Sutherland	Dallas Renegades (UFL)	August 22	
CB	Dicaprio Bootle		August 22	
DE	Ahmed Hassanein	Detroit Lions	August 26	
DE	Myles Adams	Detroit Lions	August 26	
C	Trystan Colon	Detroit Lions	August 26	
WR	Tom Kennedy	Detroit Lions	August 26	
OG	Netane Muti	Detroit Lions	August 26	
LB	Anthony Pittman	Detroit Lions	August 26	
OT	Dan Skipper	Detroit Lions	August 26	
WR	Malik Taylor		August 26	
DE	Mitchell Agude	Houston Gamblers (UFL)	August 26	
CB	Luq Barcoo	St. Louis Battlehawks (UFL)	August 26	
WR	Ronnie Bell	Detroit Lions	August 26	
OG	Gunner Britton	Louisville Kings (UFL)	August 26	
OG	Keith Cooper	Detroit Lions	August 26	
CB	Allan George	Orlando Storm (UFL)	August 26	
LB	DaRon Gilbert	Birmingham Stallions (UFL)	August 26	
S	Erick Hallett	Detroit Lions	August 26	
QB	Hendon Hooker	Carolina Panthers; New York Jets	August 26	
TE	Zach Horton	Detroit Lions	August 26	
RB	Deon Jackson	DC Defenders (UFL)	August 26	
LB	Zack Johnson		August 26	
WR	Jakobie Keeney-James	Green Bay Packers	August 26	
S	Ian Kennelly		August 26	
DE	Nate Lynn	Tennessee Titans	August 26	
DT	Brodric Martin	Kansas City Chiefs; Pittsburgh Steelers; Las Vegas Raiders	August 26	
WR	Jackson Meeks	Detroit Lions	August 26	
CB	D.J. Miller	Columbus Aviators (UFL)	August 26	
OG	Mason Miller		August 26	
C	Michael Niese	Detroit Lions	August 26	
S	Morice Norris		August 26	
TE	Gunnar Oakes	Columbus Aviators (UFL)	August 26	
CB	Tyson Russell		August 26	
RB	Jacob Saylors	Detroit Lions	August 26	
TE	Steven Stilianos	Orlando Storm (UFL)	August 26	
S	Loren Strickland	Detroit Lions	August 26	
DE	Isaac Ukwu	Detroit Lions	August 26	
S	Nick Whiteside	Detroit Lions	August 26	

==== Regular season ====
Position	Player	2025 team	Release date	Source
DE	Isaac Ukwu	Michigan Panthers (UFL)	September 4	
LB	Anthony Pittman		September 9	
LB	Monty Rice	Louisville Kings (UFL)	September 16	
WR	Ronnie Bell	New Orleans Saints	September 30	
C	Kingsley Eguakun	Detroit Lions	October 11	
DT	Chris Smith	Detroit Lions	October 11	
S	Loren Strickland	Detroit Lions	October 14	
DE	Keith Cooper	Cleveland Browns	October 16	
LB	Ty Summers	Detroit Lions	October 20	
CB	Kendall Fuller		October 27	
OT	Justin Herron		November 4	
TE	Kenny Yeboah		November 4	
S	Jammie Robinson	Atlanta Falcons	November 8	
OT	Jack Conley		November 11	
OT	Pat O'Connor	Detroit Lions	November 15	
S	Erick Hallett	Detroit Lions	November 22	
LB	Ty Summers	Chicago Bears	November 22	
DT	Quinton Jefferson		November 25	
CB	Arthur Maulet	Detroit Lions	November 25	
CB	Nick Whiteside	Detroit Lions	November 25	
RB	Craig Reynolds	New England Patriots	November 26	
CB	Tre Flowers	Pittsburgh Steelers	November 30	
OG	Netane Muti		December 1	
WR	Andrew Armstrong		December 8	
TE	Ross Dwelley	Carolina Panthers	December 9	
TE	Hayden Rucci	Miami Dolphins	December 10	

=== Practice squad poaching ===
Position	Player	2025 team	Release date	Source
DE	Andre Carter II	Miami Dolphins	November 5	
S	Erick Hallett	Tennessee Titans	December 16	

=== Retirements ===
Position	Player	Date retired	Source
DE	John Cominsky	March 31, 2025	
C	Frank Ragnow	June 2, 2025	
QB	Jake Fromm	August 18, 2025	
WR	Antoine Green	August 28, 2025	

== Draft ==
2025 Detroit Lions draft selections
Round	Selection	Player	Position	College	Notes
1	28	Tyleik Williams	DT	Ohio State	
2	57	Tate Ratledge	G	Georgia	from Broncos (Note: The Lions traded a second round selection (60th overall) and a fourth round selection (130th overall) for a 2nd round selection (57th overall) and a 7th round selection (230th overall).)
2	60	Traded to the Denver Broncos			
3	70	Isaac TeSlaa	WR	Arkansas	from Jacksonville (Note: The Jaguars traded a third round selection (70th overall), a sixth round selection (182nd overall) and a 2026 sixth round selection in exchange for a third round selection (102nd overall) and two 2026 third round selections.)
3	92	Traded to the New York Jets (Note: The Lions traded a third-round selection to the New York Jets in exchange for a 2024 fourth-round selection (126th overall).)			
3	102	Traded to the Jacksonville Jaguars			2020 Resolution JC-2A selection (Note: The Lions received a Resolution JC-2A third-round selection in both the 2025 and 2026 drafts as compensation for defensive coordinator Aaron Glenn being hired as the head coach of the New York Jets.)
4	130	Traded to the Denver Broncos			
4	134	Traded to the Philadelphia Eagles (Note: The Lions traded a 2023 seventh-round selection and RB D'Andre Swift to the Philadelphia Eagles in exchange for a fourth-round selection (134th overall) and a 2023 seventh-round selection.)			from Eagles (Note: The Lions traded a fourth-round selection (134th overall) and 2024 fifth- and sixth-round selections (164th and 201st overall) to the Philadelphia Eagles in exchange for 2024 fourth- and sixth-round selections (132nd and 210th overall).)
5	164	Traded to the Cleveland Browns (Note: The Lions traded a fifth-round selection and a 2026 sixth-round selection to the Cleveland Browns in exchange for DE Za'Darius Smith and a 2026 seventh-round selection.)			
5	171	Miles Frazier	G	LSU	from New England Patriots
6	182	Traded to the New England Patriots			from Jacksonville Jaguars
6	196	Ahmed Hassanein	DE	Boise State	from Buccaneers (Note: The Lions traded a 2024 third-round selection (92nd overall) to the Tampa Bay Buccaneers in exchange for a sixth-round selection, a 2024 sixth-round selection and CB Carlton Davis.)
6	204	Traded to the Cleveland Browns (Note: The Lions traded a sixth-round selection to the Cleveland Browns in exchange for WR Donovan Peoples-Jones.)			
7	228	Traded to the New England Patriots			from Cowboys (Note: The Lions traded 2024 first- and third-round selections (29th and 73rd overall) to the Dallas Cowboys in exchange for a seventh-round selection and a 2024 first-round selection (24th overall).)
7	230	Dan Jackson	S	Georgia	from Cardinals via Panthers and Broncos
7	244	Dominic Lovett	WR	Georgia	

Draft trades

2025 Detroit Lions undrafted free agents
Name	Position	College	Ref.
Keith Cooper	DL	Houston	
Luke Deal	TE	Auburn	
Leif Fautanu	C	Arizona State	
Gavin Holmes	CB	Texas	
Zach Horton	TE/FB	Indiana	
Jakobie Keeney-James	WR	UMass	
Ian Kennelly	S	Grand Valley State	
Jackson Meeks	WR	Syracuse	
Mason Miller	OL	North Dakota State	
Caden Prieskorn	TE	Ole Miss	
Kye Robichaux	RB	Boston College	
Tyson Russell	CB	Vanderbilt	
Anthony Tyus III	RB	Ohio	

== Personnel ==
=== Staff ===
2025 Detroit Lions staff
Front office: Owner – Sheila Ford Hamp; Vice chairpeople – William Clay Ford Jr., Martha Ford Morse, Elizabeth Ford Kontulis; President/CEO – Rod Wood; Executive vice president & general manager – Brad Holmes; Chief operating officer – Mike Disner; Special assistant/chairperson – Chris Spielman; Assistant general manager – Ray Agnew; Director of scouting – Dwayne Joseph; Director of college scouting – Brian Hudspeth; Director of pro scouting – Rob Lohman; Assistant director of pro scouting - Joe Kelleher; Senior personnel executive – John Dorsey; Senior director of football administration - Charlie Adkins; Head coaches: Head coach – Dan Campbell; Assistant head coach/wide receivers – Scottie Montgomery; Offensive coaches: Offensive coordinator – John Morton; Passing game coordinator – David Shaw; Quarterbacks – Mark Brunell; Running backs – Tashard Choice; Tight ends – Tyler Roehl; Assistant tight ends – Seth Ryan; Run game coordinator/offensive line – Hank Fraley; Assistant offensive line – Steve Oliver; Offensive assistant – Bruce Gradkowski; Offensive assistant – Marques Tuiasosopo; Offensive quality control – Justin Mesa	Defensive coaches: Defensive coordinator – Kelvin Sheppard; Run game coordinator/defensive line – Kacy Rodgers; Linebackers – Shaun Dion Hamilton; Passing game coordinator/defensive backs – Deshea Townsend; Senior defensive assistant/outside linebackers – David Corrao; Defensive assistant – Caleb Collins; Defensive assistant – August Mangin; Defensive assistant/safeties – Jim O'Neil; Defensive quality control – Dré Thompson; Special teams coaches: Special teams coordinator – Dave Fipp; Assistant special teams – Jett Modkins; Strength and conditioning: Director of sports performance – Mike Clark; Director of sports science – Jill Costanza; Head strength & conditioning – Josh Schuler; Assistant strength & conditioning – Thaddeus Jackson; Assistant strength & conditioning - Cameron Josse

=== Final roster ===
2025 Detroit Lions roster
Quarterbacks (QB): 8 Kyle Allen; 16 Jared Goff; Running backs (RB): 0 Jahmyr Gibbs; 5 David Montgomery; 25 Jacob Saylors; 33 Sione Vaki; Wide receivers (WR): 85 Tom Kennedy; 19 Dominic Lovett; 11 Kalif Raymond; 14 Amon-Ra St. Brown; 18 Isaac TeSlaa; 1 Jameson Williams; Tight ends (TE): 86 Anthony Firkser; 84 Shane Zylstra	Offensive linemen (OL): 74 Kayode Awosika G; 68 Taylor Decker T; 71 Miles Frazier G; 60 Graham Glasgow C; 73 Christian Mahogany G; 62 Michael Niese C; 69 Tate Ratledge C; 58 Penei Sewell T; 70 Dan Skipper T; Defensive linemen (DL): 92 Marcus Davenport DE; 97 Aidan Hutchinson DE; 78 Tyler Lacy DT; 51 Roy Lopez DT; 54 Alim McNeill DT; 96 Al-Quadin Muhammad DE; 98 D. J. Reader DT; 99 Tyrus Wheat DE; 91 Tyleik Williams DT; 94 Mekhi Wingo DT	Linebackers (LB): 34 Alex Anzalone OLB; 55 Derrick Barnes MLB; 46 Jack Campbell OLB; 53 Trevor Nowaske MLB; 44 Malcolm Rodriguez OLB; 15 Grant Stuard OLB; Defensive backs (DB): 30 Khalil Dorsey CB; 12 Thomas Harper FS; 29 Avonte Maddox CB; 27 Arthur Maulet CB; 13 Jalen Mills FS; 4 D. J. Reed CB; 21 Amik Robertson CB; 2 Daniel Thomas SS; 38 Nick Whiteside CB; 23 Rock Ya-Sin CB; Special teams (ST): 39 Jake Bates K; 3 Jack Fox P; 49 Hogan Hatten LS	Practice squad: 66 Myles Adams DT; 17 C. J. Beathard QB; 77 Devin Cochran T; 80 Malik Cunningham WR; 36 Keenan Garber CB; 61 Ahmed Hassanein DE (IPP); 40 Zach Horton TE; 64 Chris Hubbard T; 35 Damontae Kazee FS; 83 Jackson Meeks WR; 63 Mason Miller T; 95 Pat O'Connor DT; 88 Giovanni Ricci TE; 27 Jabari Small RB; 90 Chris Smith DT; 24 Loren Strickland SS; Reserve: 6 Terrion Arnold CB (IR); 32 Brian Branch SS (IR); 57 Trystan Colon (IR) C/G/T; 52 Zach Cunningham MLB (IR); 28 Dan Jackson SS (IR); 72 Jamarco Jones T (IR); 31 Kerby Joseph FS (IR); 87 Sam LaPorta TE (IR); 59 Giovanni Manu T (IR/DFR); -- Levi Onwuzurike DT (PUP); 93 Josh Paschal DE (NF-Inj.); 9 Ennis Rakestraw Jr. CB (IR); 25 Kye Robichaux RB (IR); 75 Colby Sorsdal T (IR); 47 Ezekiel Turner MLB (IR); 89 Brock Wright TE (IR); Rookies in italics 52 active, 16 reserve, 16 practice squad

== Preseason ==
On April 23, the NFL announced that the Lions would play the Los Angeles Chargers in the Pro Football Hall of Fame Game at 8:00 p.m. EDT on Thursday, July 31, at Tom Benson Hall of Fame Stadium in Canton, Ohio.

The remainder of the Lions' preseason opponents and schedule was announced on May 14—in conjunction with the release of the regular season schedule.

Week	Date	Opponent	Result	Record	Venue	Recap
HOF	July 31	vs. Los Angeles Chargers	L 7–34	0–1	Tom Benson Hall of Fame Stadium	Recap
1	August 8 (Note: Due to an injury involving Morice Norris, the game was suspended with over 6 minutes to go in the fourth quarter. The game was officially recorded as having been suspended with almost 15 minutes left in the quarter.)	at Atlanta Falcons	W 17–10	1–1	Mercedes-Benz Stadium	Recap
2	August 16	Miami Dolphins	L 17–24	1–2	Ford Field	Recap
3	August 23	Houston Texans	L 7–26	1–3	Ford Field	Recap

== Regular season ==
=== Schedule ===
Week	Date	Opponent	Result	Record	Venue	Recap
1	September 7	at **Green Bay Packers**	**L** 13–27	0–1	Lambeau Field	Recap
2	September 14	**Chicago Bears**	**W** 52–21	1–1	Ford Field	Recap
3	September 22	at Baltimore Ravens	**W** 38–30	2–1	M&T Bank Stadium	Recap
4	September 28	Cleveland Browns	**W** 34–10	3–1	Ford Field	Recap
5	October 5	at Cincinnati Bengals	**W** 37–24	4–1	Paycor Stadium	Recap
6	October 12	at Kansas City Chiefs	**L** 17–30	4–2	Arrowhead Stadium	Recap
7	October 20	Tampa Bay Buccaneers	**W** 24–9	5–2	Ford Field	Recap
8	Bye					
9	November 2	**Minnesota Vikings**	**L** 24–27	5–3	Ford Field	Recap
10	November 9	at Washington Commanders	**W** 44–22	6–3	Northwest Stadium	Recap
11	November 16	at Philadelphia Eagles	**L** 9–16	6–4	Lincoln Financial Field	Recap
12	November 23	New York Giants	**W** 34–27 (OT)	7–4	Ford Field	Recap
13	November 27	**Green Bay Packers**	**L** 24–31	7–5	Ford Field	Recap
14	December 4	Dallas Cowboys	**W** 44–30	8–5	Ford Field	Recap
15	December 14	at Los Angeles Rams	**L** 34–41	8–6	SoFi Stadium	Recap
16	December 21	Pittsburgh Steelers	**L** 24–29	8–7	Ford Field	Recap
17	December 25	at **Minnesota Vikings**	**L** 10–23	8–8	U.S. Bank Stadium	Recap
18	January 4	at **Chicago Bears**	**W** 19–16	9–8	Soldier Field	Recap

Note: Intra-division opponents are in bold text.

=== Game summaries ===
==== Week 1: at Green Bay Packers ====
Week 1: Detroit Lions at Green Bay Packers – Game summary

Quarter	1	2	3	4	Total
Lions	0	3	3	7	**13**
**Packers**	10	7	0	10	**27**

at Lambeau Field, Green Bay, Wisconsin

- Date: September 7
- Game time: 4:25 p.m. EDT/3:25 p.m. CDT
- Game weather: Cloudy, 60 °F (16 °C)
- Game attendance: 77,239
- Referee: Clete Blakeman
- TV announcers (CBS): Jim Nantz, Tony Romo and Tracy Wolfson
- Recap, Game Book

Game information

**First quarter**

- GB – Tucker Kraft 15-yard pass from Jordan Love (Brandon McManus kick), 9:26. Packers 7–0. **Drive: 12 plays, 83 yards, 5:34.**
- GB – Brandon McManus 34-yard field goal, 3:58. Packers 10–0. **Drive: 7 plays, 36 yards, 2:54.**

**Second quarter**

- DET – Jake Bates 30-yard field goal, 9:27. Packers 10–3. **Drive: 16 plays, 78 yards, 9:31.**
- GB – Jayden Reed 17-yard pass from Jordan Love (Brandon McManus kick), 8:34. Packers 17–3. **Drive: 2 plays, 65 yards, 0:53.**

**Third quarter**

- DET – Jake Bates 27-yard field goal, 9:40. Packers 17–6. **Drive: 9 plays, 59 yards, 5:20.**

**Fourth quarter**

- GB – Josh Jacobs 3-yard run (Brandon McManus kick), 7:57. Packers 24–6. **Drive: 8 plays, 36 yards, 4:43.**
- GB – Brandon McManus 38-yard field goal, 4:22. Packers 27–6. **Drive: 4 plays, 7 yards, 2:15.**
- DET – Isaac TeSlaa 13-yard pass from Jared Goff (Jake Bates kick), 0:55. Packers 27–13. **Drive: 13 plays, 65 yards, 3:27.**

**Top passers**

- DET – Jared Goff – 31/39, 225 yards, TD, INT
- GB – Jordan Love – 16/22, 188 yards, 2 TD

**Top rushers**

- DET – David Montgomery – 11 rushes, 25 yards
- GB – Josh Jacobs – 19 rushes, 66 yards, TD

**Top receivers**

- DET – Sam LaPorta – 6 receptions, 79 yards
- GB – Romeo Doubs – 2 receptions, 68 yards

In the season opener, the Lions visited their divisional rival, the Green Bay Packers. The Packers scored ten points in the first quarter via a 15-yard touchdown pass from Jordan Love to Tucker Kraft and a 34-yard field goal by Brandon McManus. The Lions got on the board in the second quarter via a 30-yard field goal by Jake Bates. The Packers responded with a 17-yard touchdown pass from Love to Jayden Reed, which made the score 17–3 in favor of Green Bay at half-time. The Lions scored the only points of the third quarter via a 27-yard field goal by Bates. The Packers scored ten points in the fourth quarter via a three-yard touchdown run from Josh Jacobs and a 38-yard field goal by McManus. The Lions scored the final points of the game via a 13-yard touchdown pass from Jared Goff to Isaac TeSlaa, making the final score 27–13 in favor of Green Bay. This was the first road loss for the Lions since losing to the San Francisco 49ers in the 2023 NFC Championship Game.

==== Week 2: vs. Chicago Bears ====
Week 2: Chicago Bears at Detroit Lions – Game summary

Quarter	1	2	3	4	Total
Bears	7	7	0	7	**21**
**Lions**	14	14	10	14	**52**

at Ford Field, Detroit, Michigan

- Date: September 14
- Game time: 1:00 p.m. EDT
- Game weather: None (indoor stadium)
- Game attendance: 64,201
- Referee: Land Clark
- TV announcers (Fox): Kenny Albert, Jonathan Vilma and Megan Olivi
- Recap, Game Book

Game information

**First quarter**

- DET – Jahmyr Gibbs 6-yard run (Jake Bates kick), 12:13. Lions 7–0. **Drive: 5 plays, 60 yards, 2:47.**
- CHI – Rome Odunze 28-yard pass from Caleb Williams (Cairo Santos kick), 8:30. Tied 7–7. **Drive: 8 plays, 74 yards, 3:43**
- DET – David Montgomery 1-yard run (Jake Bates] kick), 2:39. Lions 14–7. **Drive: 4 plays, 50 yards, 2:24.**

**Second quarter**

- DET – Brock Wright 8-yard pass from Jared Goff (Jake Bates kick), 4:48. Lions 21–7. **Drive: 8 plays, 67 yards, 4:57.**
- CHI – Rome Odunze 6-yard pass from Caleb Williams (Cairo Santos kick), 1:55. Lions 21–14. **Drive: 7 plays, 57 yards, 2:53**
- DET – Amon-Ra St. Brown 4-yard pass from Jared Goff (Jake Bates kick), 0:02. Lions 28–14. **Drive: 8 plays, 76 yards, 1:53.**

**Third quarter**

- DET – Jake Bates 34-yard field goal, 10:39. Lions 31–14. **Drive: 5 plays, 60 yards, 3:03.**
- DET – Jameson Williams 44-yard pass from Jared Goff (Jake Bates kick), 6:22. Lions 38–14. **Drive: 3 plays, 46 yards, 1:19.**

**Fourth quarter**

- DET – Amon-Ra St. Brown 8-yard pass from Jared Goff (Jake Bates kick), 14:56. Lions 45–14. **Drive: 7 plays, 84 yards, 4:23.**
- CHI – D'Andre Swift 3-yard run (Cairo Santos kick), 11:45. Lions 45–21. **Drive: 8 plays, 60 yards, 3:11**
- DET – Amon-Ra St. Brown 4-yard pass from Jared Goff (Jake Bates kick), 7:58. Lions 52–21. **Drive: 6 plays, 43 yards, 3:47.**

**Top passers**

- CHI – Caleb Williams – 19/30, 207 yards, 2 TD, INT
- DET – Jared Goff – 23/28, 334 yards, 5 TD

**Top rushers**

- CHI – D'Andre Swift – 12 rushes, 63 yards, TD
- DET – Jahmyr Gibbs – 12 rushes, 94 yards, TD

**Top receivers**

- CHI – Rome Odunze – 7 receptions, 128 yards, 2 TD
- DET – Amon-Ra St. Brown – 9 receptions, 115 yards, 3 TD

In Week 2, the Lions hosted their division rival the Chicago Bears. The Lions opened the scoring in the first quarter via a six-yard touchdown run from Jahmyr Gibbs. The Bears responded with a 28-yard touchdown pass from Caleb Williams to Rome Odunze to tie the game. The Lions regained the lead via a one-yard touchdown run from David Montgomery. The Lions extended their lead in the second quarter via an eight-yard touchdown pass from Jared Goff to Brock Wright. The Bears responded with a six-yard touchdown pass from Williams to Odunze. The Lions scored the final points of the half via a four-yard touchdown pass from Goff to Amon-Ra St. Brown, which made the score 28–14 in favor of Detroit at half-time. The Lions scored ten points in the third quarter via a 34-yard field goal by Jake Bates and a 44-yard touchdown pass from Goff to Jameson Williams. The teams exchanged touchdowns in the fourth quarter, first an eight-yard touchdown pass from Goff to St. Brown for the Lions, then a three-yard touchdown run from D'Andre Swift for the Bears. The Lions scored the final points of the game via a four-yard touchdown pass from Goff to St. Brown, making the final score 52–21 in favor of Detroit. This was Bears head coach Ben Johnson's first return to Detroit since leaving the Lions as offensive coordinator to become head coach of the Bears.

==== Week 3: at Baltimore Ravens ====
Week 3: Detroit Lions at Baltimore Ravens – Game summary

Quarter	1	2	3	4	Total
**Lions**	7	7	7	17	**38**
Ravens	7	7	7	9	**30**

at M&T Bank Stadium, Baltimore, Maryland

- Date: September 22
- Game time: 8:15 p.m. EDT
- Game weather: Clear, 73 °F (23 °C)
- Game attendance: 70,642
- Referee: Bill Vinovich
- TV announcers (ESPN/ABC): Joe Buck, Troy Aikman, Lisa Salters and Laura Rutledge
- Recap, Game Book

Game information

**First quarter**

- DET – Jahmyr Gibbs 1-yard run (Jake Bates kick), 9:16. Lions 7–0. **Drive: 11 plays, 67 yards, 5:44.**
- BAL – Derrick Henry 28-yard run (Tyler Loop kick), 5:40. Tied 7–7. **Drive: 6 plays, 80 yards, 3:36.**

**Second quarter**

- DET – David Montgomery 1-yard run (Jake Bates kick), 5:55. Lions 14–7. **Drive: 18 plays, 98 yards, 10:48.**
- BAL – Rashod Bateman 3-yard pass from Lamar Jackson (Tyler Loop kick), 0:24. Tied 14–14. **Drive: 4 plays, 49 yards, 0:32.**

**Third quarter**

- BAL – Mark Andrews 14-yard pass from Lamar Jackson (Tyler Loop kick), 8:51. Ravens 21–14. **Drive: 11 plays, 73 yards, 6:09.**
- DET – Amon-Ra St. Brown 18-yard pass from Jared Goff (Jake Bates kick), 5:13. Tied 21–21. **Drive: 7 plays, 60 yards, 3:38.**

**Fourth quarter**

- DET – Jahmyr Gibbs 4-yard run (Jake Bates kick), 14:55. Lions 28–21. **Drive: 7 plays, 96 yards, 3:41.**
- BAL – Tyler Loop 41-yard field goal, 9:40. Lions 28–24. **Drive: 10 plays, 49 yards, 5:15.**
- DET – Jake Bates 45-yard field goal, 6:35. Lions 31–24. **Drive: 4 plays, -11 yards, 1:51.**
- DET – David Montgomery 31-yard run (Jake Bates kick), 1:42. Lions 38–24. **Drive: 7 plays, 70 yards, 2:42.**
- BAL – Mark Andrews 27-yard pass from Lamar Jackson (pass failed), 0:29. Lions 38–30. **Drive: 6 plays, 65 yards, 1:13.**

**Top passers**

- DET – Jared Goff – 20/28, 202 yards, TD
- BAL – Lamar Jackson – 21/27, 288 yards, 3 TD

**Top rushers**

- DET – David Montgomery – 12 rushes, 151 yards, 2 TD
- BAL – Derrick Henry – 12 rushes, 50 yards, TD

**Top receivers**

- DET – Amon-Ra St. Brown – 7 receptions, 77 yards, TD
- BAL – Mark Andrews – 6 receptions, 91 yards, 2 TD

In week 3, the Lions visited the Baltimore Ravens, who were heavy favorites to win the game. The Lions opened the scoring in the first quarter via a one-yard touchdown run from Jahmyr Gibbs. The Ravens responded with a 28-yard touchdown run from Derrick Henry to tie the game. The teams exchanged touchdowns in the second quarter, first a one-yard touchdown run from David Montgomery for the Lions, then a three-yard touchdown pass from Lamar Jackson to Rashod Bateman for the Ravens, tying the score at 14–14 at half-time. The Ravens took their first lead of the game in the third quarter via a 14-yard touchdown pass from Jackson to Mark Andrews. The Lions responded with an 18-yard touchdown pass from Jared Goff to Amon-Ra St. Brown to again tie the game. The Lions extended their lead in the fourth quarter via a four-yard touchdown run from Gibbs. The teams then exchanged field goals, first a 41-yard field goal by Tyler Loop for the Ravens, then a 45-yard field goal by Jake Bates for the Lions. The Lions extended their lead via a 31-yard touchdown run from Montgomery. The Ravens scored the final points of the game via a 27-yard touchdown pass from Jackson to Andrews, followed by a failed two-point conversion attempt, making the final score 38–30 in favor of Detroit. The win marked the Lions' first victory against the Ravens since 2005, their first road victory against the Ravens in franchise history, and their first win in Baltimore since the 1977 season when they defeated the then-Baltimore Colts.

==== Week 4: vs. Cleveland Browns ====
Week 4: Cleveland Browns at Detroit Lions – Game summary

Quarter	1	2	3	4	Total
Browns	7	0	3	0	**10**
**Lions**	7	13	0	14	**34**

at Ford Field, Detroit, Michigan

- Date: September 28
- Game time: 1:00 p.m. EDT
- Game weather: None (indoor stadium)
- Game attendance: 64,494
- Referee: Shawn Smith
- TV announcers (Fox): Kenny Albert, Jonathan Vilma and Megan Olivi
- Recap, Game Book

Game information

**First quarter**

- CLE – Quinshon Judkins 1-yard run (Andre Szmyt kick), 5:36. Browns 7–0. **Drive: 13 plays, 88 yards, 7:10.**
- DET – Jahmyr Gibbs 8-yard run (Jake Bates kick), 3:20. Tied 7–7. **Drive: 5 plays, 65 yards, 2:16.**

**Second quarter**

- DET – Jake Bates 48-yard field goal, 14:17. Lions 10–7. **Drive: 5 plays, 16 yards, 2:32.**
- DET – Amon-Ra St. Brown 2-yard pass from Jared Goff (Jake Bates kick), 3:00. Lions 17–7. **Drive: 3 plays, 5 yards, 1:26.**
- DET – Jake Bates 58-yard field goal, 0:08. Lions 20–7. **Drive: 6 plays, 44 yards, 0:47.**

**Third quarter**

- CLE – Andre Szmyt 33-yard field goal, 6:44. Lions 20–10. **Drive: 8 plays, 27 yards, 3:32.**

**Fourth quarter**

- DET – Kalif Raymond 65-yard punt return (Jake Bates kick), 13:40. Lions 27–10. **Drive: 3 plays, 3 yards, 1:10.**
- DET – Amon-Ra St. Brown 8-yard pass from Jared Goff (Jake Bates kick), 4:04. Lions 34–10. **Drive: 6 plays, 20 yards, 2:58.**

**Top passers**

- CLE – Joe Flacco – 16/34, 184 yards, 2 INT
- DET – Jared Goff – 16/27, 168 yards, 2 TD, INT

**Top rushers**

- CLE – Quinshon Judkins – 21 rushes, 82 yards, TD
- DET – Jahmyr Gibbs – 15 rushes, 91 yards, TD

**Top receivers**

- CLE – Isaiah Bond – 3 receptions, 58 yards
- DET – Amon-Ra St. Brown – 7 receptions, 70 yards, TD

In week 4, the Lions hosted the Cleveland Browns. The Browns opened the scoring in the first quarter via a one-yard touchdown run from Quinshon Judkins. The Lions responded with an eight-yard touchdown run from Jahmyr Gibbs to tie the game. The Lions scored 13 points in the second quarter via a 48-yard field goal by Jake Bates, a two-yard touchdown pass from Jared Goff to Amon-Ra St. Brown, and a 58-yard field goal by Bates, which made the score 20–7 in favor of Detroit at half-time. The Browns scored the only points of the third quarter via a 33-yard field goal by Andre Szmyt. The Lions scored 14 points in the fourth quarter via a 65-yard punt return by Kalif Raymond and an eight-yard touchdown pass from Goff to St-Brown, making the final score 34–10 in favor of Detroit.

==== Week 5: at Cincinnati Bengals ====
Week 5: Detroit Lions at Cincinnati Bengals – Game summary

Quarter	1	2	3	4	Total
**Lions**	7	7	14	9	**37**
Bengals	0	3	0	21	**24**

at Paycor Stadium, Cincinnati, Ohio

- Date: October 5
- Game time: 4:25 p.m. EDT
- Game weather: Mostly sunny, 84 °F (29 °C)
- Game attendance: 66,115
- Referee: Carl Cheffers
- TV announcers (Fox): Kevin Kugler, Daryl Johnston and Allison Williams
- Recap, Game Book

Game information

**First quarter**

- DET – Sam LaPorta 10-yard pass from Jared Goff (Jake Bates kick), 10:50. Lions 7–0. **Drive: 7 plays, 58 yards, 4:10.**

**Second quarter**

- DET – Brock Wright 3-yard pass from David Montgomery (Jake Bates kick), 12:16. Lions 14–0. **Drive: 5 plays, 17 yards, 2:26.**
- CIN – Evan McPherson 50-yard field goal, 0:00. Lions 14–3. **Drive: 10 plays, 60 yards, 3:47.**

**Third quarter**

- DET – Jahmyr Gibbs 20-yard pass from Jared Goff (Jake Bates kick), 11:25. Lions 21–3. **Drive: 5 plays, 28 yards, 2:43.**
- DET – David Montgomery 8-yard run (Jake Bates kick), 5:43. Lions 28–3. **Drive: 7 plays, 80 yards, 4:10.**

**Fourth quarter**

- CIN – Ja'Marr Chase 15-yard pass from Jake Browning (Evan McPherson kick), 14:51. Lions 28–10. **Drive: 10 plays, 73 yards, 5:52.**
- CIN – Ja'Marr Chase 64-yard pass from Jake Browning (Evan McPherson kick), 10:22. Lions 28–17. **Drive: 4 plays, 70 yards, 2:07.**
- DET – Isaac TeSlaa 12-yard pass from Jared Goff (Jake Bates kick), 5:14. Lions 35–17. **Drive: 8 plays, 68 yards, 5:08.**
- CIN – Tee Higgins 2-yard pass from Jake Browning (Evan McPherson kick), 3:01. Lions 35–24. **Drive: 8 plays, 63 yards, 2:13.**
- DET – Jake Browning sacked by Derrick Barnes for safety, 1:49. Lions 37–24. **Drive: 1 play, -7 yards, 0:05.**

**Top passers**

- DET – Jared Goff – 19/23, 258 yards, 3 TD
- CIN – Jake Browning – 26/40, 251 yards, 3 TD, 3 INT

**Top rushers**

- DET – David Montgomery – 18 rushes, 65 yards, TD
- CIN – Jake Browning – 4 rushes, 31 yards

**Top receivers**

- DET – Amon-Ra St. Brown – 8 receptions, 100 yards
- CIN – Ja'Marr Chase – 6 receptions, 110 yards, 2 TD

In week 5, the Lions visited the Cincinnati Bengals. The Lions opened the scoring in the first quarter via a ten-yard touchdown pass from Jared Goff to Sam LaPorta. The Lions extended their lead in the second quarter via a three-yard touchdown pass from David Montgomery to Brock Wright. The Bengals finally got on the board via a 50-yard field goal by Evan McPherson as time expired in the half, which made the score 14–3 in favor of Detroit at half-time. The Lions scored 14 points in the third quarter via a 20-yard touchdown pass from Goff to Jahmyr Gibbs and an eight-yard touchdown run from Montgomery. The Bengals scored 14 unanswered points to begin the fourth quarter via a 15-yard touchdown pass from Jake Browning to Ja'Marr Chase and a 64-yard touchdown pass from Browning to Chase, reducing the Lions' lead to nine points. The teams then exchanged touchdowns, first a 12-yard touchdown pass from Goff to Isaac TeSlaa for the Lions, then a two-yard touchdown pass from Browning to Tee Higgins for the Bengals. The Lions scored the final points of the game via a safety, making the final score 37–24 in favor of Detroit. With the win, the Lions defeated the Bengals for the first time since 1992 and snapped their seven-game losing streak against them.

==== Week 6: at Kansas City Chiefs ====
Week 6: Detroit Lions at Kansas City Chiefs – Game summary

Quarter	1	2	3	4	Total
Lions	3	7	0	7	**17**
**Chiefs**	6	7	7	10	**30**

at Arrowhead Stadium, Kansas City, Missouri

- Date: October 12
- Game time: 8:20 p.m. EDT/7:20 p.m. CDT
- Game weather: Mostly cloudy, 85 °F (29 °C)
- Game attendance: 73,543
- Referee: Craig Wrolstad
- TV announcers (NBC): Mike Tirico, Cris Collinsworth and Melissa Stark
- Recap, Game Book

Game information

**First quarter**

- DET – Jake Bates 28-yard field goal, 5:21. Lions 3–0. **Drive: 15 plays, 61 yards, 9:39.**
- KC – Xavier Worthy 6-yard pass from Patrick Mahomes (kick failed, wide left), 1:11. Chiefs 6–3. **Drive: 8 plays, 70 yards, 4:10.**

**Second quarter**

- DET – Jameson Williams 22-yard pass from Jared Goff (Jake Bates kick), 12:49. Lions 10–6. **Drive: 6 plays, 71 yards, 3:22.**
- KC – Patrick Mahomes 1-yard run (Harrison Butker kick), 0:37. Chiefs 13–10. **Drive: 8 plays, 55 yards, 2:05.**

**Third quarter**

- KC – Hollywood Brown 9-yard pass from Patrick Mahomes (Harrison Butker kick), 11:18. Chiefs 20–10. **Drive: 8 plays, 81 yards, 3:42.**

**Fourth quarter**

- DET – Sam LaPorta 4-yard pass from Jared Goff (Jake Bates kick), 14:14. Chiefs 20–17. **Drive: 8 plays, 81 yards, 4:20.**
- KC – Hollywood Brown 3-yard pass from Patrick Mahomes (Harrison Butker kick), 9:30. Chiefs 27–17. **Drive: 9 plays, 69 yards, 4:44.**
- KC – Harrison Butker 33-yard field goal, 2:26. Chiefs 30–17. **Drive: 10 plays, 34 yards, 4:46.**

**Top passers**

- DET – Jared Goff – 23/29, 203 yards, 2 TD
- KC – Patrick Mahomes – 22/30, 257 yards, 3 TD

**Top rushers**

- DET – Jahmyr Gibbs – 17 rushes, 65 yards
- KC – Isiah Pacheco – 12 rushes, 51 yards

**Top receivers**

- DET – Jameson Williams – 6 receptions, 66 yards, TD
- KC – Travis Kelce – 6 receptions, 78 yards

In week 6, the Lions visited the Kansas City Chiefs. The Lions opened the scoring in the first quarter via a 28-yard field goal by Jake Bates. The Chiefs responded with a six-yard touchdown pass from Patrick Mahomes to Xavier Worthy, and a failed point after touchdown. The Lions regained the lead in the second quarter via a 22-yard touchdown pass from Jared Goff to Jameson Williams. The Chiefs scored the final points of the half via a one-yard touchdown run from Mahomes, which made the score 13–10 in favor of Kansas City at half-time. The Chiefs scored the only points of the third quarter via a nine-yard touchdown pass from Mahomes to Hollywood Brown. The Lions opened the fourth quarter with a four-yard touchdown pass from Goff to Sam LaPorta. The Chiefs responded with ten unanswered points via a three-yard touchdown pass from Mahomes to Brown and a 33-yard field goal by Harrison Butker, making the final score 30–17 in favor of Kansas City.

At the end of the game, a fight broke out near midfield. Mahomes attempted to give a high-five to Lions safety Brian Branch as they met near midfield. However, Branch walked past Mahomes without acknowledging him. Chiefs wide receiver JuJu Smith-Schuster confronted Branch over that. In response, Branch threw a right hook that knocked Smith-Schuster to the ground, sparking a fight. The NFL later suspended Branch one game for his actions.

==== Week 7: vs. Tampa Bay Buccaneers ====
Week 7: Tampa Bay Buccaneers at Detroit Lions – Game summary

Quarter	1	2	3	4	Total
Buccaneers	0	3	6	0	**9**
**Lions**	7	7	7	3	**24**

at Ford Field, Detroit, Michigan

- Date: October 20
- Game time: 7:00 p.m. EDT
- Game weather: None (indoor stadium)
- Game attendance: 64,656
- Referee: John Hussey
- TV announcers (ESPN/ABC): Joe Buck, Troy Aikman, Lisa Salters and Laura Rutledge
- Recap, Game Book

Game information

**First quarter**

- DET – Amon-Ra St. Brown 27-yard pass from Jared Goff (Jake Bates kick), 11:59. Lions 7–0. **Drive: 6 plays, 69 yards, 3:01.**

**Second quarter**

- DET – Jahmyr Gibbs 78-yard run (Jake Bates kick), 5:51. Lions 14–0. **Drive: 4 plays, 87 yards, 1:44.**
- TB – Chase McLaughlin 53-yard field goal, 0:00. Lions 14–3. **Drive: 3 plays, 22 yards, 0:21.**

**Third quarter**

- TB – Tez Johnson 22-yard pass from Baker Mayfield (pass failed), 8:49. Lions 14–9. **Drive: 11 plays, 67 yards, 6:11.**
- DET – Jahmyr Gibbs 5-yard run (Jake Bates kick), 4:39. Lions 21–9. **Drive: 7 plays, 73 yards, 4:10.**

**Fourth quarter**

- DET – Jake Bates 58-yard field goal, 10:18. Lions 24–9. **Drive: 4 plays, 0 yards, 1:13.**

**Top passers**

- TB – Baker Mayfield – 28/50, 228 yards, TD, INT
- DET – Jared Goff – 20/29, 241 yards, TD, INT

**Top rushers**

- TB – Rachaad White – 10 rushes, 38 yards
- DET – Jahmyr Gibbs – 17 rushes, 136 yards, 2 TD

**Top receivers**

- TB – Cade Otton – 7 receptions, 65 yards
- DET – Amon-Ra St. Brown – 6 receptions, 86 yards, TD

In week 7, the Lions hosted the Tampa Bay Buccaneers. The Lions opened the scoring in the first quarter via a 27-yard touchdown pass from Jared Goff to Amon-Ra St. Brown. The Lions extended their lead in the second quarter via a 78-yard touchdown run from Jahmyr Gibbs. The Buccaneers finally got on the board via a 53-yard field goal by Chase McLaughlin as time expired in the half, which made the score 14–3 in favor of Detroit at half-time. The Buccaneers scored in the third quarter via a 22-yard touchdown pass from Baker Mayfield to Tez Johnson, and a failed two-point conversion attempt. The Lions responded with a five-yard touchdown run from Gibbs. The Lions scored the only points of the fourth quarter via an NFL career-long tying 58-yard field goal by Jake Bates, making the final score 24–9 in favor of Detroit.

==== Week 9: vs. Minnesota Vikings ====
Week 9: Minnesota Vikings at Detroit Lions – Game summary

Quarter	1	2	3	4	Total
**Vikings**	14	3	7	3	**27**
Lions	7	7	3	7	**24**

at Ford Field, Detroit, Michigan

- Date: November 2
- Game time: 1:00 p.m. EST
- Game weather: None (indoor stadium)
- Game attendance: 64,642
- Referee: Clay Martin
- TV announcers (Fox): Kevin Burkhardt, Tom Brady, Erin Andrews and Tom Rinaldi
- Recap, Game Book

Game information

**First quarter**

- DET – Sam LaPorta 40-yard pass from Jared Goff (Jake Bates kick), 12:37. Lions 7–0. **Drive: 6 plays, 72 yards, 2:23.**
- MIN – Justin Jefferson 10-yard pass from J. J. McCarthy (Will Reichard kick), 10:17. Tied 7–7. **Drive: 5 plays, 36 yards, 2:20.**
- MIN – T. J. Hockenson 7-yard pass from J. J. McCarthy (Will Reichard kick), 4:08. Vikings 14–7. **Drive: 7 plays, 64 yards, 3:40.**

**Second quarter**

- DET – David Montgomery 2-yard run (Jake Bates] kick), 9:39. Tied 14–14. **Drive: 9 plays, 35 yards, 4:19.**
- MIN – Will Reichard 50-yard field goal, 4:42. Vikings 17–14. **Drive: 8 plays, 41 yards, 4:57.**

**Third quarter**

- MIN – J. J. McCarthy 9-yard run (Will Reichard kick), 6:04. Vikings 24–14. **Drive: 5 plays, 35 yards, 2:15.**
- DET – Jake Bates 41-yard field goal, 0:11. Vikings 24–17. **Drive: 11 plays, 38 yards, 5:53.**

**Fourth quarter**

- MIN – Will Reichard 20-yard field goal, 3:31. Vikings 27–17. **Drive: 7 plays, 24 yards, 2:49.**
- DET – Jameson Williams 37-yard pass from Jared Goff (Jake Bates kick), 1:55. Vikings 27–24. **Drive: 5 plays, 69 yards, 1:36.**

**Top passers**

- MIN – J. J. McCarthy – 14/25, 143 yards, 2 TD, INT
- DET – Jared Goff – 25/37, 284 yards, 2 TD

**Top rushers**

- MIN – Aaron Jones – 9 rushes, 78 yards
- DET – David Montgomery – 11 rushes, 40 yards, TD

**Top receivers**

- MIN – Jordan Addison – 2 receptions, 48 yards
- DET – Sam LaPorta – 6 receptions, 97 yards, TD

Following their bye week, in week 9, the Lions hosted their divisional rival, the Minnesota Vikings. The Lions opened the scoring in the first quarter via a 40-yard touchdown pass from Jared Goff to Sam LaPorta. The Vikings responded with a ten-yard touchdown pass from J. J. McCarthy to Justin Jefferson to tie the game. The Vikings extended their lead via a seven-yard touchdown pass from McCarthy to T. J. Hockenson. The Lions again tied the game in the second quarter via a two-yard touchdown run from David Montgomery. The Vikings scored the final points of the half via a 50-yard field goal by Will Reichard, which made the score 17–14 in favor of Minnesota at half-time. The Vikings extended their lead in the third quarter via a nine-yard touchdown run from McCarthy. The Lions responded with a 41-yard field goal by Jake Bates. During the fourth quarter, the Lions' attempted comeback failed when Bates' 45-yard field goal attempt was blocked by Levi Drake Rodriguez and recovered by Isaiah Rodgers. The Vikings then scored on their ensuing drive via a 20-yard field goal by Reichard, extending their lead to ten points. The Lions scored the final points of the game via a 37-yard touchdown pass from Goff to Jameson Williams, making the final score 27–24 in favor of Minnesota. The Lions finished with a season-high 10 penalties and allowed a season-high five sacks. This was the Lions' first loss to the Vikings since 2022.

==== Week 10: at Washington Commanders ====
Week 10: Detroit Lions at Washington Commanders – Game summary

Quarter	1	2	3	4	Total
**Lions**	14	11	10	9	**44**
Commanders	3	7	6	6	**22**

at Northwest Stadium, Landover, Maryland

- Date: November 9
- Game time: 4:25 p.m. EST
- Game weather: Mostly cloudy, 65 °F (18 °C)
- Game attendance: 64,470
- Referee: Scott Novak
- TV announcers (Fox): Kenny Albert, Jonathan Vilma and Megan Olivi
- Recap, Game Book

Game information

**First quarter**

- DET – Jahmyr Gibbs 14-yard pass from Jared Goff (Jake Bates kick), 8:24. Lions 7–0. **Drive: 10 plays, 78 yards, 5:04.**
- WAS – Matt Gay 44-yard field goal, 5:43. Lions 7–3. **Drive: 7 plays, 26 yards, 2:41.**
- DET – Amon-Ra St. Brown 9-yard pass from Jared Goff (Jake Bates kick), 1:54. Lions 14–3. **Drive: 9 plays, 65 yards, 3:49.**

**Second quarter**

- DET – Jahmyr Gibbs 13-yard run (David Montgomery run), 9:41. Lions 22–3. **Drive: 9 plays, 87 yards, 5:11.**
- WAS – Chris Rodriguez Jr. 1-yard run (Matt Gay kick), 3:39. Lions 22–10. **Drive: 10 plays, 75 yards, 6:02.**
- DET – Jake Bates 22-yard field goal, 0:11. Lions 25–10. **Drive: 13 plays, 64 yards, 3:28.**

**Third quarter**

- DET – Jameson Williams 14-yard pass from Jared Goff (Jake Bates kick), 12:06. Lions 32–10. **Drive: 5 plays, 72 yards, 2:54.**
- WAS – Deebo Samuel 4-yard pass from Marcus Mariota (pass failed), 7:05. Lions 32–16. **Drive: 9 plays, 69 yards, 5:01.**
- DET – Jake Bates 28-yard field goal, 2:30. Lions 35–16. **Drive: 9 plays, 72 yards, 4:35.**

**Fourth quarter**

- DET – Jahmyr Gibbs 43-yard run (kick blocked), 12:50. Lions 41–16. **Drive: 6 plays, 84 yards, 3:03.**
- WAS – Ben Sinnott 4-yard pass from Marcus Mariota (run failed), 6:57. Lions 41–22. **Drive: 11 plays, 81 yards, 5:53.**
- DET – Jake Bates 48-yard field goal, 4:34. Lions 44–22. **Drive: 6 plays, 15 yards, 2:23.**

**Top passers**

- DET – Jared Goff – 25/33, 320 yards, 3 TD
- WAS – Marcus Mariota – 16/22, 213 yards, 2 TD

**Top rushers**

- DET – Jahmyr Gibbs – 15 rushes, 142 yards, 2 TD
- WAS – Jacory Croskey-Merritt – 11 rushes, 30 yards

**Top receivers**

- DET – Jameson Williams – 6 receptions, 119 yards, TD
- WAS – Treylon Burks – 3 receptions, 58 yards

In week 10, the Lions visited the Washington Commanders in a rematch of the 2024 Divisional Round. The Lions opened the scoring in the first quarter via a 14-yard touchdown pass from Jared Goff to Jahmyr Gibbs. The Commanders responded with a 44-yard field goal by Matt Gay. The Lions extended their lead via a nine-yard touchdown pass from Goff to Amon-Ra St. Brown. The Lions extended their lead in the second quarter via a 13-yard touchdown run from Gibbs and a two-point conversion run by David Montgomery. The Commanders responded with a one-yard touchdown run from Chris Rodriguez Jr.. The Lions scored the final points of the half via a 22-yard field goal by Jake Bates, which made the score 25–10 in favor of Detroit at half-time. The Lions scored ten points in the third quarter via a 14-yard touchdown pass from Goff to Jameson Williams and a 28-yard field goal by Bates. The Commanders responded with a four-yard touchdown pass from Marcus Mariota to Deebo Samuel, and a failed two-point conversion attempt. The Lions extended their lead in the fourth quarter via a 43-yard touchdown run from Gibbs, and a blocked extra point kick. The Commanders responded with a four-yard touchdown pass from Mariota to Ben Sinnott, and a failed two-point conversion attempt. The Lions scored the final points of the game via a 48-yard field goal by Bates, making the final score 44–22 in favor of Detroit.

Played at Northwest Stadium, roughly ten miles east of Washington, D.C., Donald Trump was in attendance for this game, becoming the first sitting U.S. president to attend an NFL game since Jimmy Carter in October 1978. This led to extra security measures being enacted and Air Force One flying over the stadium in the first quarter. Trump also spoke from the broadcast booth with Kenny Albert and Jonathan Vilma during the third quarter. Trump was booed when he appeared on the jumbotron at halftime.

With the blowout win, Detroit improved to 6–3.

==== Week 11: at Philadelphia Eagles ====
Week 11: Detroit Lions at Philadelphia Eagles – Game summary

Quarter	1	2	3	4	Total
Lions	0	6	0	3	**9**
**Eagles**	3	10	0	3	**16**

at Lincoln Financial Field, Philadelphia, Pennsylvania

- Date: November 16
- Game time: 8:20 p.m. EST
- Game weather: Clear, 45 °F (7 °C)
- Game attendance: 69,879
- Referee: Alex Kemp
- TV announcers (NBC): Mike Tirico, Cris Collinsworth and Melissa Stark
- Recap, Game Book

Game information

**First quarter**

- PHI – Jake Elliott 27-yard field goal, 9:43. Eagles 3–0. **Drive: 4 plays, 2 yards, 1:25.**

**Second quarter**

- PHI – Jake Elliott 34-yard field goal, 6:02. Eagles 6–0. **Drive: 9 plays, 27 yards, 5:14.**
- DET – Jameson Williams 40-yard pass from Jared Goff (kick failed, wide right), 5:05. Tied 6–6. **Drive: 3 plays, 74 yards, 0:57.**
- PHI – Jalen Hurts 1-yard run (Jake Elliott kick), 0:16. Eagle 13–6. **Drive: 10 plays, 64 yards, 4:49.**

**Third quarter**

- No scoring plays.

**Fourth quarter**

- PHI – Jake Elliott 49-yard field goal, 10:15. Eagles 16–6. **Drive: 11 plays, 25 yards, 6:00.**
- DET – Jake Bates 54-yard field goal, 1:58. Eagles 16–9. **Drive: 4 plays, -7 yards, 0:59.**

**Top passers**

- DET – Jared Goff – 14/37, 255 yards, TD, INT
- PHI – Jalen Hurts – 14/28, 135 yards

**Top rushers**

- DET – Jahmyr Gibbs – 12 rushes, 39 yards
- PHI – Saquon Barkley – 26 rushes, 83 yards

**Top receivers**

- DET – Jahmyr Gibbs – 5 receptions, 107 yards
- PHI – A. J. Brown – 7 receptions, 49 yards

In Week 11, the Lions visited the defending Super Bowl champion Philadelphia Eagles. Philadelphia opened the scoring in the first quarter with a 27-yard field goal by kicker Jake Elliott, and extended its lead in the second quarter with a 34-yard field goal, also by Elliott. Detroit responded with a 40-yard touchdown pass from Jared Goff to Jameson Williams. Following the score, Williams was assessed a 15-yard unsportsmanlike conduct penalty, enforcing the foul on the extra point attempt. The resulting 48-yard attempt sailed wide right, leaving the game tied. The Eagles retook the lead late in the half on a one-yard touchdown run by quarterback Jalen Hurts, making the score 13–6 at halftime. After a scoreless third quarter, Philadelphia extended its lead in the fourth with a 49-yard field goal by Elliott. The Lions scored the final points of the game via a 54-yard field goal by Jake Bates, making the final score 16–9 in favor of Philadelphia. The Lions finished the game 0-for-5 on fourth-down conversion attempts.

==== Week 12: vs. New York Giants ====
Week 12: New York Giants at Detroit Lions – Game summary

Quarter	1	2	3	4	OT	Total
Giants	10	10	0	7	0	**27**
**Lions**	0	17	0	10	7	**34**

at Ford Field, Detroit, Michigan

- Date: November 23
- Game time: 1:00 p.m. EST
- Game weather: None (indoor stadium)
- Game attendance: 64,238
- Referee: Craig Wrolstad
- TV announcers (Fox): Kenny Albert, Jonathan Vilma and Megan Olivi
- Recap, Game Book

Game information

**First quarter**

- NYG – Wan'Dale Robinson 39-yard pass from Jameis Winston (Younghoe Koo kick), 12:56. Giants 7–0. **Drive: 4 plays, 70 yards, 2:04.**
- NYG – Younghoe Koo 21-yard field goal, 0:00. Giants 10–0. **Drive: 10 plays, 87 yards, 5:03.**

**Second quarter**

- DET – Amon-Ra St. Brown 11-yard pass from Jared Goff (Jake Bates kick), 11:41. Giants 10–7. **Drive: 7 plays, 65 yards, 3:19.**
- NYG – Isaiah Hodgins 12-yard pass from Jameis Winston (Younghoe Koo kick), 8:21. Giants 17–7. **Drive: 6 plays, 69 yards, 3:20.**
- DET – Jahmyr Gibbs 3-yard pass from Jared Goff (Jake Bates kick), 2:16. Giants 17–14. **Drive: 3 plays, 61 yards, 1:45.**
- NYG – Younghoe Koo 44-yard field goal, 0:38. Giants 20–14. **Drive: 6 plays, 56 yards, 1:38.**
- DET – Jake Bates 37-yard field goal, 0:00. Giants 20–17. **Drive: 5 plays, 38 yards, 0:38.**

**Third quarter**

- No scoring plays.

**Fourth quarter**

- NYG – Jameis Winston 33-yard pass from Gunner Olszewski (Younghoe Koo kick), 12:16. Giants 27–17. **Drive: 9 plays, 85 yards, 5:03.**
- DET – Jahmyr Gibbs 49-yard run (Jake Bates kick), 10:50. Giants 27–24. **Drive: 3 plays, 81 yards, 1:26.**
- DET – Jake Bates 59-yard field goal, 0:28. Tied 27–27. **Drive: 13 plays, 53 yards, 2:26.**

**Overtime**

- DET – Jahmyr Gibbs 69-yard run (Jake Bates kick), 9:42. Lions 34–27. **Drive: 1 play, 69 yards, 0:18.**

**Top passers**

- NYG – Jameis Winston – 18/36, 366 yards, 2 TD, INT
- DET – Jared Goff – 28/42, 279 yards, 2 TD, INT

**Top rushers**

- NYG – Tyrone Tracy Jr. – 20 rushes, 62 yards
- DET – Jahmyr Gibbs – 15 rushes, 219 yards, 2 TD

**Top receivers**

- NYG – Wan'Dale Robinson – 9 receptions, 156 yards, TD
- DET – Amon-Ra St. Brown – 9 receptions, 149 yards, TD

In Week 12, the Lions hosted the New York Giants. The Giants scored ten points in the first quarter via a 39-yard touchdown pass from Jameis Winston to Wan'Dale Robinson and a 21-yard field goal by Younghoe Koo. The Lions finally got on the board in the second quarter via an 11-yard touchdown pass from Jared Goff to Amon-Ra St. Brown. The teams then exchanged touchdowns, first a 12-yard touchdown pas from Winston to Isaiah Hodgins for the Giants, then a three-yard touchdown pass from Goff to Jahmyr Gibbs for the Lions. The Giants extended their lead via a 44-yard field goal by Koo. The Lions scored the final points of the half via a 37-yard field goal by Jake Bates as time expired, which made the score 20–17 in favor of New York at half-time. After a scoreless third quarter, the Giants extended their lead in the fourth quarter via a 33-yard touchdown pass from Gunner Olszewski to Winston. The Lions scored 10 unanswered points via a 49-yard touchdown run from Gibbs and a Lions' franchise-record-tying 59-yard field goal by Bates to tie the game and force overtime. During overtime, the Lions scored on the first play via a 69-yard touchdown run from Gibbs. The Giants' attempted comeback failed when Winston was sacked by Aidan Hutchinson on the final possession of the game, making the final score 34–27 in favor of Detroit. With the win, the Lions knocked the Giants out of playoff contention to improve to 7–4 and 2–1 against the NFC East.

The 59-yard field goal by Jake Bates tied a Lions franchise record for longest field goal.

==== Week 13: vs. Green Bay Packers ====
Thanksgiving Day games

Week 13: Green Bay Packers at Detroit Lions – Game summary

Quarter	1	2	3	4	Total
**Packers**	3	14	14	0	**31**
Lions	0	14	7	3	**24**

at Ford Field, Detroit, Michigan

- Date: November 27
- Game time: 1:00 p.m. EST
- Game weather: None (indoor stadium)
- Game attendance: 66,662
- Referee: Ron Torbert
- TV announcers (Fox): Kevin Burkhardt, Tom Brady, Erin Andrews and Tom Rinaldi
- Recap, Game Book

Game information

**First quarter**

- GB – Brandon McManus 45-yard field goal, 9:12. Packers 3–0. **Drive: 12 plays, 56 yards, 5:48**

**Second quarter**

- GB – Dontayvion Wicks 22-yard pass from Jordan Love (Brandon McManus kick), 14:19. Packers 10–0. **Drive: 9 plays, 77 yards, 4:07**
- DET – David Montgomery 3-yard run (Jake Bates Kick), 7:54. Packers 10–7. **Drive: 10 plays, 65 yards, 6:25**
- GB – Romeo Doubs 2-yard pass from Jordan Love (Brandon McManus Kick), 2:12. Packers 17–7. **Drive: 12 plays, 70 yards, 5:42**
- DET – Jameson Williams 22-yard pass from Jared Goff (Jake Bates Kick), 0:25. Packers 17–14. **Drive: 7 plays, 65 yards, 1:47**

**Third quarter**

- GB – Christian Watson 51-yard pass from Jordan Love (Brandon McManus Kick), 10:31. Packers 24–14. **Drive: 2 plays, 51 yards, 0:37**
- DET – Isaac TeSlaa 17-yard pass from Jared Goff (Jake Bates Kick), 7:25. Packers 24–21. **Drive: 5 plays, 71 yards, 3:06**
- GB – Dontayvion Wicks 1-yard pass from Jordan Love (Brandon McManus Kick), 1:44. Packers 31–21. **Drive: 9 plays, 72 yards, 5:41**

**Fourth quarter**

- DET – Jake Bates 31-yard field goal, 2:59. Packers 31–24. **Drive: 13 plays, 67 yards, 6:03**

**Top passers**

- GB – Jordan Love – 18/30, 234 yards, 4 TD
- DET – Jared Goff – 20/26, 256 yards, 2 TD

**Top rushers**

- GB – Josh Jacobs – 17 rushes, 83 yards
- DET – Jahmyr Gibbs – 20 rushes, 68 yards

**Top receivers**

- GB – Dontayvion Wicks – 6 receptions, 94 yards, 2 TD
- DET – Jameson Williams – 7 receptions, 144 yards, TD

For their annual Thanksgiving Day game, the Lions hosted their divisional rival, the Green Bay Packers. For the first time since the 1982 season, the kickoff time was 1:00 p.m. rather than 12:30 p.m., as the NFL moved the start time to align with the traditional broadcast window. The Packers opened the scoring in the first quarter via a 45-yard field goal by Brandon McManus. The Packers scored 14 points in the second quarter via a 22-yard touchdown pass from Jordan Love to Dontayvion Wicks and a two-yard touchdown pass from Love to Romeo Doubs. The Lions scored 14 points in the quarter via a three-yard touchdown run from David Montgomery, and a 22-yard touchdown pass from Jared Goff to Jameson Williams, which made the score 17–14 in favor of Green Bay at half-time. The Packers scored 14 points in the third quarter via a 51-yard touchdown pass from Love to Christian Watson and a one-yard touchdown pass from Love to Wicks. The Lions responded with a 17-yard touchdown pass from Goff to Isaac TeSlaa. The Lions scored the only points of the fourth quarter via a 31-yard field goal by Jake Bates, making the final score 31–24 in favor of Green Bay. For the second game this season, they failed to convert on any 4th down conversions, going 0/3 on 4th Downs. With the loss, the Lions were swept by the Packers for the first time since 2020.

==== Week 14: vs. Dallas Cowboys ====
Week 14: Dallas Cowboys at Detroit Lions – Game summary

Quarter	1	2	3	4	Total
Cowboys	3	6	10	11	**30**
**Lions**	10	10	7	17	**44**

at Ford Field, Detroit, Michigan

- Date: December 4
- Game time: 8:15 p.m. EST
- Game weather: None (indoor stadium)
- Game attendance: 64,028
- Referee: Shawn Hochuli
- TV announcers (WJBK, KDFW): Al Michaels, Kirk Herbstreit and Kaylee Hartung
- Recap, Game Book

Game information

**First quarter**

- DET – Jake Bates 31-yard field goal, 10:46. Lions 3–0. **Drive: 8 plays, 44 yards, 4:14**
- DAL – Brandon Aubrey 57-yard field goal, 8:07. Tied 3–3. **Drive: 8 plays, 29 yards, 2:39**
- DET – Jahmyr Gibbs 1-yard run (Jake Bates Kick), 2:14. Lions 10–3. **Drive: 6 plays, 42 yards, 3:10**

**Second quarter**

- DAL – Brandon Aubrey 42-yard field goal, 9:23. Lions 10–6. **Drive: 16 plays, 46 yards, 7:51**
- DET – David Montgomery 35-yard run (Jake Bates Kick), 4:27. Lions 17–6. **Drive: 4 plays, 53 yards, 1:48**
- DAL – Brandon Aubrey 55-yard field goal, 0:50. Lions 17–9. **Drive: 9 plays, 43 yards, 3:37**
- DET – Jake Bates 47-yard field goal, 0:00. Lions 20–9. **Drive: 6 plays, 45 yards, 0:50**

**Third quarter**

- DET – Isaac TeSlaa 12-yard pass from Jared Goff (Jake Bates Kick), 14:14. Lions 27–9. **Drive: 2 plays, 14 yards, 0:34**
- DAL – Javonte Williams 1-yard run (Brandon Aubrey Kick), 10:41. Lions 27–16. **Drive: 9 plays, 65 yards, 3:33**
- DAL – Brandon Aubrey 63-yard field goal, 2:49. Lions 27–19. **Drive: 6 plays, 13 yards, 2:56**

**Fourth quarter**

- DET – Jake Bates 46-yard field goal, 11:50. Lions 30–19. **Drive: 10 plays, 40 yards, 5:59**
- DAL – Ryan Flournoy 42-yard pass from Dak Prescott (Dak Prescott–Jake Ferguson pass), 9:52. Lions 30–27. **Drive: 4 plays, 70 yards, 1:58**
- DET – Jahmyr Gibbs 10-yard run (Jake Bates Kick), 7:17. Lions 37–27. **Drive: 5 plays, 59 yards, 2:35**
- DAL – Brandon Aubrey 29-yard field goal, 3:42. Lions 37–30. **Drive: 13 plays, 56 yards, 3:35**
- DET – Jahmyr Gibbs 13-yard run (Jake Bates Kick), 2:29. Lions 44–30. **Drive: 3 plays, 51 yards, 1:23**

**Top passers**

- DAL – Dak Prescott – 31/47, 376 yards, TD, 2 INT
- DET – Jared Goff – 25/34, 309 yards, TD

**Top rushers**

- DAL – Javonte Williams – 17 rushes, 67 yards, TD
- DET – David Montgomery – 6 rushes, 60 yards, TD

**Top receivers**

- DAL – CeeDee Lamb – 6 receptions, 121 yards
- DET – Jameson Williams – 7 receptions, 96 yards

In week 14, the Lions hosted the Dallas Cowboys. The game was exclusive to WJBK in Detroit. The Lions opened the scoring in the first quarter via a 38-yard field goal by Jake Bates. The Cowboys responded with a 57-yard field goal by Brandon Aubrey to tie the game. The Lions regained the lead via a one-yard touchdown run from Jahmyr Gibbs. The Cowboys scored six points in the second quarter via two field goals by Aubrey, from 42-yards, and 55-yards, respectively. The Lions responded with a 35-yard touchdown run from David Montgomery. The Lions scored the final points of the quarter via a 47-yard field goal by Bates as time expired in the half, which made the score 20–9 in favor of Detroit at half-time. The Lions extended their lead in the third quarter via a 12-yard touchdown pass from Jared Goff to Isaac TeSlaa. The Cowboys scored ten points in the quarter via a one-yard touchdown run from Javonte Williams and a 63-yard field goal by Aubrey. The Cowboys scored 11 points in the fourth quarter via a 42-yard touchdown pass from Dak Prescott to Ryan Flournoy and a two-point conversion pass from Prescott to Jake Ferguson, and a 29-yard field goal by Aubrey. The Lions scored 17 points in the quarter via a 46-yard field goal by Bates, and two rushing touchdowns from Gibbs, from ten yards and 13 yards, respectively, making the final score 44–30 in favor of Detroit. With their second straight win over Dallas, the Lions improved to 8–5 and finished 3–1 against the NFC East.

==== Week 15: at Los Angeles Rams ====
Week 15: Detroit Lions at Los Angeles Rams – Game summary

Quarter	1	2	3	4	Total
Lions	7	17	0	10	**34**
**Rams**	7	10	17	7	**41**

at SoFi Stadium, Inglewood, California

- Date: December 14
- Game time: 4:25 p.m. EST/1:25 p.m. PST
- Game weather: Sunny, 65 °F (18 °C) (fixed roof)
- Game attendance: 74,701
- Referee: Alan Eck
- TV announcers (Fox): Kevin Burkhardt, Tom Brady, Erin Andrews and Tom Rinaldi
- Recap, Game Book

Game information

**First quarter**

- DET – Amon-Ra St. Brown 17-yard pass from Jared Goff (Jake Bates Kick), 8:07. Lions 7–0. **Drive: 1 play, 17 yards, 0:05**
- LAR – Kyren Williams 4-yard run (Harrison Mevis Kick), 2:44. Tied 7–7. **Drive: 13 plays, 72 yards, 5:23**

**Second quarter**

- DET – Jake Bates 24-yard field goal, 12:04. Lions 10–7. **Drive: 12 plays, 59 yards, 5:40**
- LAR – Kyren Williams 1-yard run (Harrison Mevis Kick), 8:31. Rams 14–10. **Drive: 6 plays, 69 yards, 3:33**
- DET – Amon-Ra St. Brown 8-yard pass from Jared Goff (Jake Bates Kick), 6:12. Lions 17–14. **Drive: 4 plays, 65 yards, 2:19**
- DET – Jameson Williams 31-yard pass from Jared Goff (Jake Bates Kick), 0:30. Lions 24–14. **Drive: 9 plays, 80 yards, 2:39**
- LAR – Harrison Mevis 37-yard field goal, 0:00. Lions 24–17. **Drive: 5 plays, 47 yards, 0:30**

**Third quarter**

- LAR – Harrison Mevis 44-yard field goal, 9:07. Lions 24–20. **Drive: 11 plays, 41 yards, 5:53**
- LAR – Colby Parkinson 26-yard pass from Matthew Stafford (Harrison Mevis Kick), 2:26. Rams 27–24. **Drive: 9 plays, 88 yards, 4:13**
- LAR – Blake Corum 11-yard run (Harrison Mevis Kick), 0:28. Rams 34–24. **Drive: 2 plays, 50 yards, 0:52**

**Fourth quarter**

- DET – Jake Bates 48-yard field goal, 7:54. Rams 34–27. **Drive: 9 plays, 36 yards, 4:32**
- LAR – Colby Parkinson 11-yard pass from Matthew Stafford (Harrison Mevis Kick), 4:49. Rams 41–27. **Drive: 6 plays, 68 yards, 3:05**
- DET – David Montgomery 1-yard run (Jake Bates Kick), 2:42. Rams 41–34. **Drive: 12 plays, 65 yards, 2:07**

**Top passers**

- DET – Jared Goff – 25/41, 338 yards, 3 TD
- LAR – Matthew Stafford – 24/38, 368 yards, 2 TD, INT

**Top rushers**

- DET – Jahmyr Gibbs – 13 rushes, 38 yards
- LAR – Kyren Williams – 15 rushes, 78 yards, 2 TD

**Top receivers**

- DET – Jameson Williams – 13 receptions, 164 yards, 2 TD
- LAR – Puka Nacua – 9 receptions, 181 yards

In week 15, the Lions visited the Los Angeles Rams. The Lions opened the scoring in the first quarter via a 17-yard touchdown pass from Jared Goff to Amon-Ra St. Brown. The Rams responded with a four-yard touchdown run from Kyren Williams to tie the game. The Lions scored 17 points in the second quarter via a 24-yard field goal by Jake Bates, an eight-yard touchdown pass from Goff to St. Brown and a 31-yard touchdown pass from Goff to Jameson Williams. The Rams scored ten points in the quarter via a one-yard touchdown run from Williams and a 37-yard field goal by Harrison Mevis as time expired in the half, which made the score 24–17 in favor of Detroit at half-time. The Rams scored 17 points in the third quarter via a 44-yard field goal by Mevis, a 26-yard touchdown pass from Matthew Stafford to Colby Parkinson, and an 11-yard touchdown run from Blake Corum. The Rams extended their lead in the fourth quarter via an 11-yard touchdown pass from Stafford to Parkinson. The Lions scored ten points in the quarter via a 48-yard field goal by Jake Bates and a one-yard touchdown run from David Montgomery, making the final score 34–41 in favor of Los Angeles.

==== Week 16: vs. Pittsburgh Steelers ====
Week 16: Pittsburgh Steelers at Detroit Lions – Game summary

Quarter	1	2	3	4	Total
**Steelers**	3	7	2	17	**29**
Lions	0	10	0	14	**24**

at Ford Field, Detroit, Michigan

- Date: December 21
- Game time: 4:25 p.m. EST
- Game weather: None (indoor stadium)
- Game attendance: 63,798
- Referee: Carl Cheffers
- TV announcers (CBS): Jim Nantz, Tony Romo and Tracy Wolfson
- Recap, Game Book

Game information

**First quarter**

- PIT – Chris Boswell 59-yard field goal, 9:21. Steelers 3–0. **Drive: 9 plays, 30 yards, 3:47**

**Second quarter**

- DET – Jake Bates 36-yard field goal, 10:10. Tied 3–3. **Drive: 8 plays, 44 yards, 3:20**
- DET – Isaac TeSlaa 20-yard pass from Jared Goff (Jake Bates Kick), 1:55. Lions 10–3. **Drive: 6 plays, 62 yards, 2:07**
- PIT – Kenneth Gainwell 45-yard pass from Aaron Rodgers (Chris Boswell Kick), 0:02. Tied 10–10. **Drive: 11 plays, 80 yards, 1:53**

**Third quarter**

- PIT – Jared Goff sacked by Kyle Dugger for safety, 9:42. Steelers 12–10. **Drive: 3 plays, -3 yards, 0:51**

**Fourth quarter**

- PIT – Chris Boswell 23-yard field goal, 14:58. Steelers 15–10. **Drive: 17 plays, 64 yards, 9:44**
- PIT – Jaylen Warren 45-yard run (Chris Boswell Kick), 12:23. Steelers 22–10 **Drive: 4 plays, 61 yards, 2:02**
- DET – Kalif Raymond 27-yard pass from Jared Goff (Jake Bates Kick), 8:39. Steelers 22–17. **Drive: 10 plays, 74 yards, 3:44**
- PIT – Jaylen Warren 45-yard run (Chris Boswell Kick), 6:41. Steelers 29–17 **Drive: 3 plays, 65 yards, 1:58**
- DET – Jahmyr Gibbs 4-yard pass from Jared Goff (Jake Bates Kick), 4:11. Steelers 29–24. **Drive: 10 plays, 68 yards, 2:30**

**Top passers**

- PTI – Aaron Rodgers – 27/41, 266 yards, TD
- DET – Jared Goff – 35/54, 364 yards, 3 TD

**Top rushers**

- PIT – Jaylen Warren – 14 rushes, 143 yards, 2 TD
- DET – David Montgomery – 4 rushes, 14 yards

**Top receivers**

- PIT – Kenneth Gainwell – 5 receptions, 78 yards, TD
- DET – Jameson Williams – 5 receptions, 70 yards

The Lions faced the Pittsburgh Steelers and quarterback Aaron Rodgers, who had previously played for the Packers, the Lions’ divisional rivals.

The Steelers opened the scoring in the first quarter via a 59-yard field goal by Chris Boswell. The Lions scored ten points in the second quarter via a 36-yard field goal by Jake Bates and a 20-yard touchdown pass from Jared Goff to Isaac TeSlaa. The Steelers scored the final points of the half via a 45-yard touchdown pass from Aaron Rodgers to Kenneth Gainwell, tying the score at 10–10 at half-time. The Steelers scored the only points of the third quarter via a safety. The Steelers scored 17 points in the fourth quarter via a 23-yard field goal by Boswell, and two 45-yard rushing touchdowns by Jaylen Warren. The Lions scored 14 points in the quarter via a 27-yard touchdown pass from Goff to Kalif Raymond and a four-yard touchdown pass from Goff to Jahmyr Gibbs. The Lions' attempted comeback failed when on the final play, Goff threw a fourth-down pass to Amon-Ra St. Brown, who caught the ball at the one yard line, but couldn't get in the end zone, so he lateraled the ball back to Goff, and Goff scored a touchdown as time expired. However, multiple flags were thrown, and officials huddled for several minutes before announcing that although Jared Goff had scored a touchdown, it was nullified by an offensive pass interference penalty on Amon-Ra St. Brown, making the final score 29–24 in favor of Pittsburgh. The Lions’ defense struggled, allowing Pittsburgh to finish with 481 total yards.

With the loss, the Lions lost two consecutive games for the first time since the October 23 and October 30 games of the 2022 season.

During the game, Steelers receiver DK Metcalf was involved in an altercation with a fan seated near the sideline. Video footage from the game showed Metcalf grabbing a shirt and engaging in a verbal exchange with the fan before attempting to strike the individual. The incident was not observed by game officials, and no penalty was assessed during the game. Following the game, the National Football League stated that they were reviewing the incident. After carefully reviewing the incident, Metcalf was suspended for the last two games of the regular season.

==== Week 17: at Minnesota Vikings ====
Christmas Day games

Week 17: Detroit Lions at Minnesota Vikings – Game summary

Quarter	1	2	3	4	Total
Lions	0	7	0	3	**10**
**Vikings**	7	0	6	10	**23**

at U.S. Bank Stadium, Minneapolis, Minnesota

- Date: December 25
- Game time: 4:30 p.m. EST/3:30 p.m. CST
- Game weather: None (indoor stadium)
- Game attendance: 66,874
- Referee: Shawn Smith
- TV announcers (WWJ, WCCO, Netflix): Noah Eagle, Drew Brees, AJ Ross and Dianna Russini
  Exclusive to CBS affiliates in Detroit and Minneapolis-St. Paul areas. Out of market, game broadcast on Netflix.
- Recap, Game Book

Game information

**First quarter**

- MIN – Aaron Jones 1-yard run (Will Reichard kick), 1:35. Vikings 7–0. **Drive: 5 plays, 16 yards, 2:07.**

**Second quarter**

- DET – Isaac TeSlaa 4-yard pass from Jared Goff (Jake Bates kick), 1:05. Tied 7–7. **Drive: 19 plays, 80 yards, 10:08.**

**Third quarter**

- MIN – Will Reichard 52-yard field goal, 3:03. Vikings 10–7. **Drive: 9 plays, 28 yards, 4:54.**
- MIN – Will Reichard 56-yard field goal, 1:57. Vikings 13–7. **Drive: 4 plays, 4 yards, 0:55.**

**Fourth quarter**

- DET – Jake Bates 48-yard field goal, 4:39. Vikings 13–10. **Drive: 7 plays, 25 yards, 2:33.**
- MIN – Jordan Addison 65-yard run (Will Reichard kick), 3:43. Vikings 20–10. **Drive: 2 plays, 65 yards, 0:56.**
- MIN – Will Reichard 42-yard field goal, 1:04. Vikings 23–10. **Drive: 7 plays, 21 yards, 2:01.**

**Top passers**

- DET – Jared Goff – 18/29, 197 yards, TD, 2 INT
- MIN – Max Brosmer – 9/16, 51 yards

**Top rushers**

- DET – Jahmyr Gibbs – 17 rushes, 41 yards
- MIN – Jordan Addison – 1 rush, 65 yards, TD

**Top receivers**

- DET – Amon-Ra St. Brown – 8 receptions, 68 yards
- MIN – Justin Jefferson – 4 receptions, 30 yards

In Week 17, the Lions visited their division rival, the Minnesota Vikings on Christmas Day. The Vikings opened the scoring in the first quarter via a one-yard touchdown run from Aaron Jones. The Lions wouldn't get on the board until the final minutes of the second quarter via a four-yard touchdown pass from Jared Goff to Isaac TeSlaa, tying the score at 7–7 at half-time. The Vikings scored six points in the third quarter via two field goals by Will Reichard from 52 and 56 yards, respectively. The Lions scored their only points of the second half via a 48-yard field goal by Jake Bates. The Vikings scored 10 points in the fourth quarter via a 65-yard touchdown run from Jordan Addison and a 42-yard field goal by Reichard, making the final score 10–23 in favor of Minnesota. The Lions finished the game with a season-high six turnovers, after entering the game with eight turnovers through Week 16. This was their most turnovers in a game since 2015. With the upset loss, they fell to 8–8 and were officially eliminated from playoff contention for the first time since 2022, and were swept by Minnesota for the first time since 2020.

==== Week 18: at Chicago Bears ====
Week 18: Detroit Lions at Chicago Bears – Game summary

Quarter	1	2	3	4	Total
**Lions**	3	10	3	3	**19**
Bears	0	0	0	16	**16**

at Soldier Field, Chicago, Illinois

- Date: January 4
- Game time: 4:25 p.m. EST
- Game weather: Mostly cloudy, 33 °F (1 °C)
- Game attendance: 57,036
- Referee: Brad Rogers
- TV announcers (Fox): Kevin Burkhardt, Tom Brady, Erin Andrews and Tom Rinaldi
- Recap, Game Book

Game information

**First quarter**

- DET – Jake Bates 34-yard field goal, 8:35. Lions 3–0. **Drive: 11 plays, 55 yards, 6:25.**

**Second quarter**

- DET – Jake Bates 30-yard field goal, 11:28. Lions 6–0. **Drive: 16 plays, 66 yards, 7:11.**
- DET – Jahmyr Gibbs 15-yard pass from Jared Goff (Jake Bates kick), 4:40. Lions 13–0. **Drive: 9 plays, 76 yards, 5:06.**

**Third quarter**

- DET – Jake Bates 25-yard field goal, 2:11. Lions 16–0. **Drive: 11 plays, 74 yards, 5:34.**

**Fourth quarter**

- CHI – Jahdae Walker 25-yard pass from Caleb Williams (Kyle Monangai run), 14:16. Lions 16–8. **Drive: 7 plays, 65 yards, 2:55.**
- CHI – Colston Loveland 1-yard pass from Caleb Williams (Caleb Williams–Cole Kmet pass), 5:25. Tied 16–16. **Drive: 12 plays, 88 yards, 5:56.**
- DET – Jake Bates 42-yard field goal, 0:00. Lions 19–16. **Drive: 6 plays, 39 yards, 1:41.**

**Top passers**

- DET – Jared Goff – 27/42, 331 yards, TD, INT
- CHI – Caleb Williams – 20/33, 212 yards, 2 TD, INT

**Top rushers**

- DET – Jahmyr Gibbs – 19 rushes, 80 yards
- CHI – D'Andre Swift – 10 rushes, 40 yards

**Top receivers**

- DET – Amon-Ra St. Brown – 11 receptions, 139 yards
- CHI – Colston Loveland – 10 receptions, 91 yards, TD

To close out the season, the Lions visited their divisional rival, the Chicago Bears. The Lions opened the scoring in the first quarter via a 34-yard field goal by Jake Bates. They scored 10 points in the second quarter via a 30-yard field goal by Bates and a 15-yard touchdown pass from Jared Goff to Jahmyr Gibbs, which made the score 13–0 in favor of Detroit at halftime. They extended their lead in the third quarter via a 25-yard field goal by Bates. After being held scoreless for the first three quarters of the game, the Bears scored 16 points in the fourth via a 25-yard touchdown pass from Caleb Williams to Jahdae Walker, and a two-point conversion run by Kyle Monangai. They then scored a one-yard touchdown pass from Williams to Colston Loveland, and a two-point conversion pass to Cole Kmet to tie the game. The Lions scored the final points of the game via a 42-yard field goal by Bates as time expired, making the final score 19–16 in favor of Detroit. With the upset win, the Lions finished their season with a 9–8 record. However, with the Vikings' win over the Packers earlier in the day, this ensured the Lions finished last in the NFC North for the first time since 2021.

=== Standings ===
==== Division ====
NFC North
	W	L	T	PCT	DIV	CONF	PF	PA	STK
^{(2)} Chicago Bears	11	6	0	.647	2–4	7–5	441	415	L2
^{(7)} Green Bay Packers	9	7	1	.559	4–2	7–4–1	391	360	L4
Minnesota Vikings	9	8	0	.529	4–2	7–5	344	333	W5
Detroit Lions	9	8	0	.529	2–4	6–6	481	413	W1

==== Conference ====
NFC
Seed	Team	Division	W	L	T	PCT	DIV	CONF	SOS	SOV	STK
**Division leaders**
1	Seattle Seahawks	West	14	3	0	.824	4–2	9–3	.498	.471	W7
2 (Note: Chicago finished ahead of Philadelphia based on head-to-head victory.)	Chicago Bears	North	11	6	0	.647	2–4	7–5	.458	.406	L2
3	Philadelphia Eagles	East	11	6	0	.647	3–3	8–4	.476	.455	L1
4 (Note: Carolina finished ahead of Tampa Bay and Atlanta based on head-to-head record (Carolina 3–1 to Tampa Bay 2–2 and Atlanta 1–3).)	Carolina Panthers	South	8	9	0	.471	3–3	6–6	.522	.463	L2
**Wild cards**
5 (Note: LA Rams finished ahead of San Francisco based on common games (LA Rams 9–3 to San Francisco 8–4 against: Arizona, Atlanta, Carolina, Houston, Indianapolis, Jacksonville, New Orleans, Seattle, Tampa Bay and Tennessee).)	Los Angeles Rams	West	12	5	0	.706	4–2	7–5	.526	.485	W1
6	San Francisco 49ers	West	12	5	0	.706	4–2	9–3	.498	.417	L1
7	Green Bay Packers	North	9	7	1	.559	4–2	7–4–1	.483	.431	L4
**Did not qualify for the postseason**
8 (Note: Minnesota finished ahead of Detroit based on head-to-head sweep.)	Minnesota Vikings	North	9	8	0	.529	4–2	7–5	.514	.431	W5
9	Detroit Lions	North	9	8	0	.529	2–4	6–6	.490	.428	W1
10 (Note: Tampa Bay finished ahead of Atlanta based on common games (Tampa Bay 6–6 to Atlanta 5–7 against: Arizona, Buffalo, Carolina, LA Rams, Miami, New England, New Orleans, NY Jets, San Francisco and Seattle).)	Tampa Bay Buccaneers	South	8	9	0	.471	3–3	6–6	.529	.485	W1
11	Atlanta Falcons	South	8	9	0	.471	3–3	7–5	.495	.449	W4
12	Dallas Cowboys	East	7	9	1	.441	4–2	4–7–1	.438	.311	L1
13	New Orleans Saints	South	6	11	0	.353	3–3	4–8	.495	.333	L1
14	Washington Commanders	East	5	12	0	.294	3–3	3–9	.507	.388	W1
15	New York Giants	East	4	13	0	.235	2–4	2–10	.524	.478	W2
16	Arizona Cardinals	West	3	14	0	.176	0–6	3–9	.571	.422	L9
**Tiebreakers** (Note: When breaking ties for three or more teams under the NFL's rules, they are first broken within divisions, then comparing only the highest ranked remaining team from each division.)
