= Isaac TeSlaa =

American football player (born 2002)

- TeSlaa at the 2025 Senior Bowl

No. 18 – Detroit Lions
- Position: Wide receiver
- Roster status: Active

Personal information
- Born: February 20, 2002 (age 24); Hudsonville, Michigan, U.S.
- Listed height: 6 ft 4 in (1.93 m)
- Listed weight: 214 lb (97 kg)

Career information
- High school: Unity Christian (Hudsonville)
- College: Hillsdale (2020–2022); Arkansas (2023–2024)
- NFL draft: 2025: 3rd round, 70th overall pick

Career history
- Detroit Lions (2025–present)

Awards and highlights
- G-MAC Offensive Player of the Year (2022); First-team All-G-MAC (2022); Second-team All-G-MAC (2021)

Career NFL statistics as of Week 10, 2026
- Receptions: 26
- Receiving yards: 464
- Receiving touchdowns: 7
- Stats at Pro Football Reference

Isaac TeSlaa (teh-SLAH; born February 20, 2002) is an American professional football wide receiver for the Detroit Lions of the National Football League (NFL). He played college football for the Hillsdale Chargers and Arkansas Razorbacks. He was selected by the Lions in the third round of the 2025 NFL draft.

== Early life ==
TeSlaa is from Hudsonville, Michigan. His father, Mark, played college football as a wide receiver for the Hillsdale Chargers. TeSlaa grew up playing football as a quarterback and became a starter at Unity Christian High School as a junior. He led Unity Christian to the state championship that season, the first in school history. He then helped Unity Christian reach the state playoff semifinals in 2019, and that year he threw for 448 yards and 10 touchdowns while rushing for 1,139 yards and 14 touchdowns.

In addition to participating in football, TeSlaa also helped the basketball team to a state championship and competed in track and field, setting the school long jump record. He was lightly recruited and only had a single NCAA Division I offer, from the FCS-level Valparaiso Beacons. TeSlaa opted to sign with the Hillsdale Chargers, where his father and several other family members had attended.

== College career ==
=== Hillsdale ===
TeSlaa became a wide receiver at Hillsdale and became a starter during his freshman season. In the COVID-19-shortened 2020–21 season, he caught five passes for 93 yards. He then led the team in the fall 2021 season with 45 receptions for 698 yards and seven touchdowns. He was named second-team All-Great Midwest Athletic Conference and placed third in the league in touchdown catches and fourth in receiving yards. In the 2022 season, he was one of the top NCAA Division II wide receivers, totaling 68 receptions for 1,325 yards and 13 touchdowns while being named the conference offensive player of the year. He was also named an honorable mention All-American and recorded seven games with at least 100 yards, finishing with an average of over 120 yards per game. He appeared in a total of 26 games in his tenure at Hillsdale, starting 24 of them and totaling 118 receptions for 2,116 yards and 19 touchdowns.

=== Arkansas ===
TeSlaa transferred to the Arkansas Razorbacks following his third season at Hillsdale. He was the team's second-leading receiver during the 2023 season, recording 34 catches for 351 yards and two touchdowns. He returned for the 2024 season and recorded 28 receptions for 545 yards and three touchdowns, finishing his two-year stint with the Razorbacks having caught 62 passes for 896 yards and five touchdowns in 25 games played, 17 of which he started. He declared for the NFL draft after the season and was invited to the 2025 Senior Bowl.

=== Statistics ===
Year	Team	Games		Receiving			
Year	Team	GP	GS	Rec	Yds	Avg	TD
2020–21	Hillsdale	3	0	5	93	18.6	0
2021	Hillsdale	12	10	45	698	15.5	6
2022	Hillsdale	11	11	68	1,325	19.5	13
2023	Arkansas	12	12	34	351	10.3	2
2024	Arkansas	13	5	28	545	19.5	3
D-II career		26	21	118	2,116	17.9	19
FBS career		25	17	62	896	14.5	5

== Professional career ==
Pre-draft measurables
Height	Weight	Arm length	Hand span	Wingspan	40-yard dash	10-yard split	20-yard split	20-yard shuttle	Three-cone drill	Vertical jump	Broad jump	Bench press
6 ft 3 5/8 in (1.92 m)	214 lb (97 kg)	31 1/8 in (0.79 m)	10 in (0.25 m)	6 ft 4 3/4 in (1.95 m)	4.43 s	1.51 s	2.61 s	4.05 s	6.85 s	39.5 in (1.00 m)	10 ft 9 in (3.28 m)	17 reps
All values from NFL Combine

TeSlaa was selected in the third round (70th overall) of the 2025 NFL draft by the Detroit Lions. He made his NFL debut in the season opener against the Green Bay Packers at Lambeau Field. TeSlaa recorded his first NFL reception and touchdown on a 13-yard one-handed diving catch from quarterback Jared Goff, reaching above his head to secure the pass before falling into the end zone. Despite the game being out of reach, the play gained attention and was ranked No. 19 on the NFL's Top 100 Plays of the 2025 NFL season. In the following week's game against the Chicago Bears, TeSlaa recorded his second career reception on a 29-yard one-handed diving catch. Both of his first two NFL receptions were one-handed catches, and each play was featured on the NFL's Top 100 Plays of the 2025 season, ranking No. 19 and No. 91, respectively. He earned his first professional start in Week 3 against the Baltimore Ravens. From Weeks 13 through 17, TeSlaa recorded a touchdown reception in four of five games. TeSlaa finished the season appearing in all 17 games, making three starts, and recorded 16 receptions for 239 yards and six touchdowns.

== NFL career statistics ==
Year	Team	Games		Receiving					Fumbles	
Year	Team	GP	GS	Rec	Yds	Avg	Lng	TD	Fum	Lost
2025	DET	17	3	16	239	14.9	29	6	0	0
2026	DET	9	4	13	225	17.3	57	1	0	0
Career		26	7	29	464	16.0	57	7	0	0
