= Hayden Large =

American football player (born 2002)

No. 43 – Chicago Bears
- Position: Tight end
- Roster status: Injured reserve

Personal information
- Born: March 27, 2002 (age 24); Hudsonville, Michigan, U.S.
- Listed height: 6 ft 4 in (1.93 m)
- Listed weight: 250 lb (113 kg)

Career information
- High school: Unity Christian (Hudsonville, Michigan)
- College: Dordt (2020–2022); Iowa (2023–2025)
- NFL draft: 2026: undrafted

Career history
- Chicago Bears (2026–present)
- Stats at Pro Football Reference

Hayden Large (born March 27, 2002) is an American professional football tight end for the Chicago Bears of the National Football League (NFL). He played college football for the Dordt Defenders and Iowa Hawkeyes.

== Early life ==
Large was born on March 27, 2002 and attended Unity Christian High School in Hudsonville, Michigan. He played tight end, running back, linebacker and safety. Large earned all-state honors as a junior, with 1,272 rushing yards and 14 touchdowns, 60 tackles and two interceptions. Large missed his senior year due to a left knee injury and committed to play college football for Dordt University.

== College career ==
Large played college football for the Dordt Defenders from 2020 to 2022 and Iowa Hawkeyes from 2023 to 2025. In three seasons at Dordt, he had 62 receptions for 950 yards and 12 touchdowns.

In 2023, Large transferred to the University of Iowa as a walk-on. He played in 38 games at fullback and tight end, recording 14 receptions for 89 yards.

== Professional career ==
Pre-draft measurables
Height	Weight	Arm length	Hand span	Wingspan	40-yard dash	10-yard split	20-yard split	20-yard shuttle	Three-cone drill	Vertical jump	Broad jump	Bench press
6 ft 3 3/4 in (1.92 m)	255 lb (116 kg)	31 1/8 in (0.79 m)	9 in (0.23 m)	6 ft 3 3/8 in (1.91 m)	4.73 s	1.57 s	2.70 s	4.32 s	7.20 s	34.5 in (0.88 m)	10 ft 0 in (3.05 m)	17 reps
All values from Pro Day

After going undrafted in the 2026 NFL draft, Large signed with the Chicago Bears as an undrafted free agent on May 8, 2026. He was placed on injured reserve on September 1, due to a core injury.
