= Laura Heyboer =

American professional soccer player

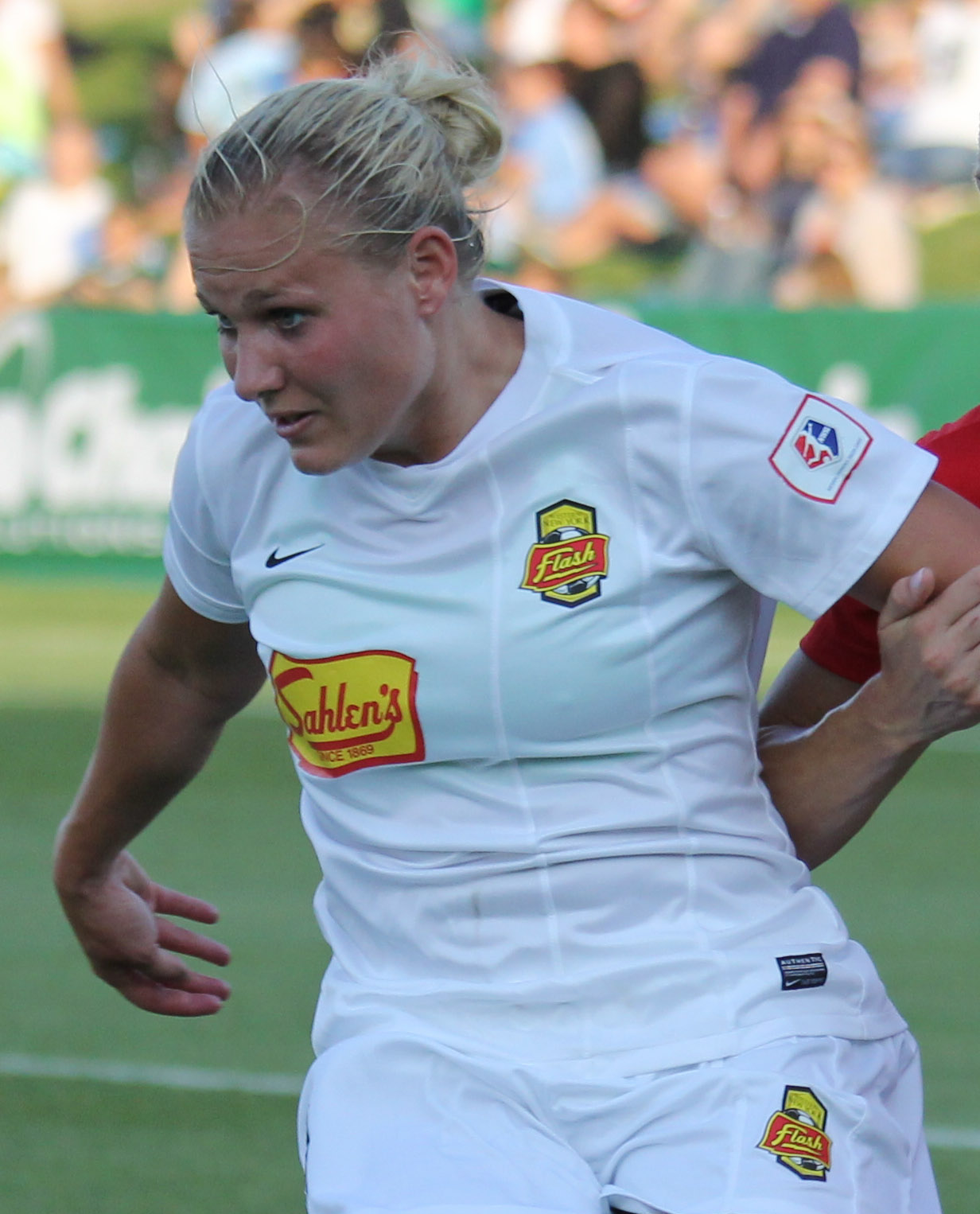

Personal information
- Full name: Laura Jo Heethuis
- Birth name: Laura Jo Heyboer
- Date of birth: July 20, 1989 (age 37)
- Place of birth: Hudsonville, Michigan, United States
- Height: 5 ft 6 in (1.68 m)
- Position: Forward

Youth career
- –: Bloomfield Force

College career
Years	Team	Apps	(Gls)
2008–2011	Michigan State Spartans		

Senior career*
Years	Team	Apps	(Gls)
2012	Sky Blue FC		
2012–2013	Western New York Flash		

International career
2006	United States U17		
2009–2011	United States U23		
- * Club domestic league appearances and goals

Laura Jo Heethuis (née Heyboer; born July 20, 1989) is a soccer coach and former American professional soccer forward. She played for Western New York Flash in the NWSL and was a member of the United States U-23 women's national soccer team. She is currently the head women's soccer coach and assistant men's soccer coach at Waynesburg University.

== Early life ==
Heyboer was born in Michigan to parents, Dale and Joy Heyboer. She attended Unity Christian High School in her hometown of Hudsonville, Michigan where she graduated cum laude. She finished her high school career as Michigan's all-time points leader with 290. She was a two-time Michigan Miss Soccer and two-time Gatorade Player of the Year, the only player in state history to win each award twice. She ranked second all-time in Michigan girls' soccer history in goals with 167 and assists with 123. Heyboer helped lead her team to a 107–1–1 record and four state championships. She was a four-time first-team all-state selection and served as team captain for three seasons. During her freshman year, she led the team to the state title, scoring 40 goals with 29 assists. During her sophomore year, she totaled 76 points with 42 goals and 34 assists. During her junior year, she scored 41nl goals and provided 24 assists helping the team to a 28–0–0 record. As a senior, Heyboer tallied 80 points with 44 goals and 36 assists.

Heyboer won the State Cup and national title with club team, Bloomfield Force. With the Force, she won the Golden Boot award as most outstanding player at a national tournament and was named MVP of the 2006 San Diego Surf Cup. She played on the Olympic Development Program (ODP) State Team for seven years from 2001 to 2007.

=== Michigan State University ===
Heyboer attended Michigan State University. She left MSU as the Spartans' all-time leading scorer, third for most game-winners in a single season with five, fifth for career game-winners with 13, and second in career points with 95. As a freshman, she led the Big Ten Conference in scoring and finished fifth in the nation with 51 points. She became the first freshman in league history to win Offensive Player of the Year since the award's inception in 2004. She tied for third in the nation and led the Big Ten in goals with 21. Heyboer became the first Spartan to win Big Ten Freshman of the Year and first to earn Offensive Player of the Year honors since 1994. She was one of 15 finalists for the Hermann Trophy the same year.

During her sophomore year, Heyboer ranked sixth in the Big Ten in goals with eight, second in game winning goals with four and tenth in assists with five. She started the first 15 games of the season before suffering a knee injury while scoring the game-winning goal against Minnesota in overtime. She missed the remainder of the season after her injury. Heyboer was named to Third team All-American for the second consecutive year and to the All-Big Ten First Team, one of only two Spartans to do it in consecutive years. She was also named to First Team All-Great Lakes Region Team.

As a junior, Heyboer started all 19 games and ranked fifth in school history for career game-winners with 13, second in all-time points with 95, and scored a team-best of 10 goals. She notched third in Michigan State's single-season recordbook for most game-winning goals with five. She was named NSCAA/Performance Subaru Women's Division I All-American, making her the only active Division I player who is a three-time All America. She was named to the NSCAA All-Great Lakes Region First Team, CoSIDA All-District First Team, All-Big Ten First Team, and All-District First Team for College Sports Information Directors of America Academic All-America.

== Club career ==
=== Sky Blue FC ===
Heyboer was drafted in the fourth round of the 2012 WPS Draft to Sky Blue FC; however, the league folded before the season began. She traveled to Japan with members of Sky Blue FC and Western New York Flash to play in a few exhibition games against INAC Kobe Leonessa.

=== Western New York Flash ===
Later in 2012, Heyboer played for the Western New York Flash in the WPSL Elite. The team clinched the league championship title after a win over the Chicago Red Stars after overtime and a penalty kick shootout.

With the start of the National Women's Soccer League in 2013, Heyboer was selected by the Seattle Reign FC during the 2013 NWSL Supplemental Draft as their third pick (eighteenth pick overall). She later signed with the Western New York Flash.

Heyboer was waived by the Flash on October 18, 2013. She made six appearances for the Flash during the inaugural NWSL season, starting three games. In her 216 minutes played, Heyboer tallied one assist, a helper to Samantha Kerr against the Boston Breakers on April 27.

== International career ==
Heyboer represented the United States as a member of the U-15 women's national team in 2004. She has also played for the U-17 team. She is currently a member of the U-23 team.

== Coaching career ==
In 2012, Heyboer was a volunteer assistant coach for the University of Miami.

In 2014, Heethuis became head women's coach at Waynesburg University. Additionally, she is an assistant coach for the Waynesburg men's team, which is coached by her husband, Brad Heethuis. Conversely, Brad is also an assistant coach for the women's team.

== Honors ==
Western New York Flash

- NWSL Shield: 2013

Individual

- Big Ten Offensive Player of the Year: 2008
