= Khalil Dorsey =

American football player (born 1998)

No. 30 – Detroit Lions
- Position: Cornerback
- Roster status: Active

Personal information
- Born: March 31, 1998 (age 28); Ontario, California, U.S.
- Listed height: 5 ft 8 in (1.73 m)
- Listed weight: 188 lb (85 kg)

Career information
- High school: Colony (Ontario)
- College: Northern Arizona (2016–2019)
- NFL draft: 2020: undrafted

Career history
- Baltimore Ravens (2020–2021); New York Giants (2022)*; Detroit Lions (2022–present)
- * Offseason or practice squad member only

Awards and highlights
- First-team All-Big Sky (2018); Second-team All-Big Sky (2017)

Career NFL statistics as of Week 10, 2026
- Total tackles: 50
- Pass deflections: 4
- Return yards: 430
- Stats at Pro Football Reference

Khalil Isaiah Dorsey (born March 31, 1998) is an American professional football cornerback for the Detroit Lions of the National Football League (NFL). He was signed by the Baltimore Ravens as an undrafted free agent in 2020 following his college football career at Northern Arizona.

== College career ==
Year	Team	G	Tackles				Interceptions						Fumbles			
Year	Team	G	Comb	Solo	Ast	Sack	Int	Yds	Avg	Lng	TDs	PD	FF	FR	Yds	TD
2016	NAU	11	47	33	14	1.0	2	0	0.0	0	0	11	0	0	0	0
2017	NAU	12	49	29	20	0.0	3	3	1.0	3	0	9	0	0	0	0
2018	NAU	10	33	25	8	0.0	3	10	3.3	10	0	9	1	0	0	0
2019	NAU	11	68	52	16	0.0	0	0	0.0	0	0	12	2	0	0	0
Total		44	197	139	58	1.0	8	13	1.6	10	0	41	3	0	0	0

== Professional career ==
Pre-draft measurables
Height	Weight	Arm length	Hand span	Wingspan
5 ft 8 3/4 in (1.75 m)	181 lb (82 kg)	30 1/8 in (0.77 m)	7 3/4 in (0.20 m)	5 ft 11 1/2 in (1.82 m)
All values from Pro Day

=== Baltimore Ravens ===
Dorsey signed with the Baltimore Ravens as an undrafted free agent following the 2020 NFL draft on May 5, 2020. He was waived during final roster cuts on September 5, and signed to the team's practice squad the next day. Dorsey was elevated to the active roster on September 28 for the team's week 3 game against the Kansas City Chiefs, and reverted to the practice squad after the game. He was elevated again on October 3 for the week 4 game against the Washington Football Team, and reverted to the practice squad again following the game. Dorsey was promoted to the active roster on October 9. He was placed on injured reserve on November 10. Dorsey was placed on the reserve/COVID-19 list by the team on November 28, and moved back to injured reserve three days later.

On August 16, 2021, Dorsey was placed on injured reserve.

During rehabilitation for his injuries, Dorsey has won praise for his volunteer work in the community.

=== New York Giants ===
On May 18, 2022, Dorsey signed with the New York Giants. He was waived by the Giants on August 30.

=== Detroit Lions ===
On December 15, 2022, Dorsey was signed to the Detroit Lions' practice squad. He signed a reserve/future contract with the team on January 9, 2023. On September 16, Dorsey was placed on injured reserve after being diagnosed with rhabdomyolysis. He was activated on October 14. In Week 17 against the Dallas Cowboys, Dorsey was part of a trick play in which he caught a 31–yard fake punt pass from Jalen Reeves-Maybin to keep the Lions' drive alive.

On October 27, 2024, Dorsey had a career–best 72–yard kick return in a blowout win against the Tennessee Titans. He made 14 appearances for Detroit in 2024, totaling 2 pass deflections and 14 combined tackles. On December 17, Dorsey was placed on injured reserve with an ankle injury, ending his season.

On March 20, 2025, Dorsey was re-signed by the Lions. On October 8, he was placed on injured reserve due to a wrist injury and a concussion. Dorsey was activated on November 22, ahead of the team's Week 12 matchup against the New York Giants.

== NFL career statistics ==
Legend
**Bold**	Career high

=== Regular season ===
Year	Team	Games		Tackles					Interceptions						Fumbles					Kick returns				
Year	Team	GP	GS	Cmb	Solo	Ast	Sck	TFL	Int	Yds	Avg	Lng	TD	PD	FF	Fum	FR	Yds	TD	Ret	Yds	Avg	Lng	TD
2020	BAL	6	0	2	2	0	0.0	0	0	0	0.0	0	0	0	0	0	0	0	0	0	0	0.0	0	0
2023	DET	13	2	11	7	4	0.0	0	0	0	0.0	0	0	1	0	0	0	0	0	**12**	**244**	20.3	30	0
2024	DET	14	1	14	8	**6**	0.0	**1**	0	0	0.0	0	0	**2**	0	0	0	0	0	4	159	**39.8**	**72**	0
2025	DET	11	0	8	6	2	0.0	0	0	0	0.0	0	0	0	0	0	0	0	0	0	0	0.0	0	0
2026	DET	9	0	**15**	**11**	4	0.0	**1**	0	0	0.0	0	0	1	0	0	0	0	0	1	27	27.0	27	0
Career		53	3	50	34	16	0.0	2	0	0	0.0	0	0	4	0	0	0	0	0	17	430	25.3	72	0

=== Postseason ===
Year	Team	Games		Tackles					Interceptions						Fumbles				
Year	Team	GP	GS	Cmb	Solo	Ast	Sck	TFL	Int	Yds	Avg	Lng	TD	PD	FF	Fum	FR	Yds	TD
2023	DET	3	0	1	1	0	0.0	0	0	0	0.0	0	0	0	0	0	0	0	0
Career		3	0	1	1	0	0.0	0	0	0	0.0	0	0	0	0	0	0	0	0

== Personal life ==
Dorsey is of African-American and Mexican descent.
