= Unity Christian High School (Hudsonville) =

Private high school in Michigan, United States

Coordinates: 42.87245°N 85.86847°W

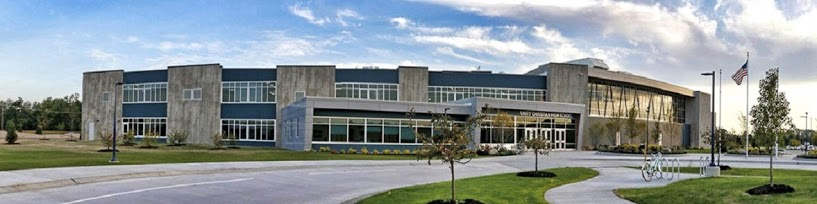
- 48th Street Campus building in March 2016

Location
- 5900 48th Street; Hudsonville, Michigan 49426; United States

Information
- Type: Private, 501(c)(3), high school
- Motto: Faith. Excellence. Service.
- Religious affiliation: Christian
- Established: 1953
- NCES District ID: 00643813
- CEEB code: 232055
- Principal: Jerry DeGroot
- Faculty: 32.8 (on a FTE basis)
- Grades: 9-12
- Enrollment: 767
- Colors: Blue and White
- Athletics conference: Ottawa-Kent Conference
- Mascot: Crusaders
- Publication: The Tidings
- Affiliation: Christian Schools International
- Website: www.unitychristian.org

Unity Christian High School is a private Christian school located in Hudsonville, Michigan. It is a member of Christian Schools International.

Unity Christian had approximately 767 students for the 2025–2026 school year. Unity offers several Advanced Placement courses. The school also supports a band as well as an orchestra program, both of which have been successful at state band and orchestra festival.

== Academics ==
Unity offers over 100 courses including 9 Advanced Placement classes, as well as Careerline Tech Center courses. The A.P. classes that Unity offers are: Spanish Language, English Language, English Literature, Calculus, Statistics, Physics, Music Theory, U.S. History and U.S. Government. Traditional classes are graded on the 4 point GPA scale, while A.P. classes are weighted to a 5-point scale. The school operates with semesters as opposed to trimesters or quarters.

== Athletics ==
Unity Christian High School is a member of the Michigan High School Athletic Association (MHSAA) and the Michigan Interscholastic Horsemanship Association (MIHA), and competes in the Ottawa-Kent Conference Green Division. The school offers 13 varsity sports for boys and 11 for girls. Boys are offered soccer, football, baseball, basketball, bowling, tennis, track and field, cross country, golf, wrestling, swimming, ice hockey (cooperative team with Hudsonville High School), and lacrosse (cooperative team with Holland Christian High School). Girls are offered soccer, softball, basketball, bowling, golf, track and field, cross country, tennis, volleyball, and swimming. A co-ed equestrian team is offered as well. Unity Christian's equestrian, bowling, softball, and track and field teams have also been successful in state competitions.

The Crusader varsity girls' soccer team had a 98-game unbeaten streak from 2005 to 2008. The school's American football team entered the MHSAA playoffs in 2007 for the first time. In 2008, the football team lost a first round playoff game to the eventual state champion, Holland Christian. In 2018 the football team won the Division 5 state championship. In 2021, the football team set a new single season state scoring record on their way to the state finals.

=== MHSAA State Championships ===
- 1973 Girls Basketball - Class B
- 1992 Softball - Class B
- 1994 Equestrian - B Division (MIHA)
- 1998 Equestrian - B Division (MIHA)
- 2004 Boys Bowling - Class B
- 2005 Girls Soccer - Division 3
- 2006 Girls Soccer - Division 3
- 2006 Girls Basketball - Class B
- 2007 Girls Soccer - Division 3
- 2007 Boys Soccer - Division 2
- 2008 Girls Soccer - Division 3
- 2009 Girls Soccer - Division 3
- 2009 Boys Soccer - Division 2
- 2010 Girls Soccer - Division 3
- 2012 Girls Soccer - Division 3
- 2012 Boys Soccer - Division 2
- 2014 Boys Soccer - Division 3
- 2014 Girls Soccer - Division 3
- 2015 Girls Soccer - Division 3
- 2016 Girls Soccer - Division 3
- 2018 Boys Soccer - Division 3
- 2018 Football - Division 5
- 2019 Boys Basketball - Division 2
- 2022 Vex Robotics

== Notable alumni ==
- Bethany Balcer, soccer player
- Laura Heyboer, soccer player
- Hayden Large, NFL tight end for the Chicago Bears
- Hillary Scholten, American politician
- Isaac TeSlaa, American football player
- Roger Victory, American politician
