= Tyson Russell =

American football player (born 2002)

No. 26 – BC Lions
- Position: Defensive back
- Roster status: Active
- CFL status: American

Personal information
- Born: July 16, 2002 (age 24); Plantation, Florida, U.S.
- Listed height: 5 ft 11 in (1.80 m)
- Listed weight: 190 lb (86 kg)

Career information
- High school: St. Thomas Aquinas (Fort Lauderdale, Florida)
- College: Vanderbilt (2021–2024)
- NFL draft: 2025: undrafted

Career history
- Detroit Lions (2025)*; BC Lions (2026–present)
- * Offseason or practice squad member only
- Stats at CFL.ca

Tyson Russell (born July 16, 2002) is an American professional football defensive back for the BC Lions of the Canadian Football League (CFL). He played college football for the Vanderbilt Commodores.

== College career ==
Russell played college football for the Vanderbilt Commodores from 2021 to 2024. He played in 44 games making 92 total tackles, including 2.5 for loss, one interception and five pass deflections.

== Professional career ==
Pre-draft measurables
Height	Weight	Arm length	Hand span	Wingspan	40-yard dash	10-yard split	20-yard split	20-yard shuttle	Three-cone drill
5 ft 10 in (1.78 m)	184 lb (83 kg)	32 in (0.81 m)	9 3/4 in (0.25 m)	6 ft 3 1/4 in (1.91 m)	4.63 s	1.62 s	2.65 s	4.25 s	7.07 s
All values from Pro Day

=== Detroit Lions ===
After going undrafted in the 2025 NFL draft, Russell signed with the Detroit Lions of the National Football League (NFL) as an undrafted free agent. He was waived on August 26.

=== BC Lions ===
On December 17, 2025, Russell signed with the BC Lions of the Canadian Football League (CFL). He made his debut in Week 2 of the 2026 season against the Saskatchewan Roughriders, recording three tackles. On July 16, 2026, Russell was assigned to the Lions' practice roster. On July 30, 2026, Russell was recalled to the Lions' active roster. On August 7, 2026, Russell was placed on the Lions' 6-game injured list and he remained there to end the 2026 CFL season.

== Personal life ==
Russell is the son of Twan Russell, who played in the NFL for seven seasons as a linebacker for the Washington Redskins, Miami Dolphins, and Atlanta Falcons.
