= Devin Cochran =

American football player (born 1998)

No. 77 – Detroit Lions
- Position: Offensive tackle
- Roster status: Practice squad

Personal information
- Born: July 17, 1998 (age 28); Norcross, Georgia, U.S.
- Listed height: 6 ft 7 in (2.01 m)
- Listed weight: 330 lb (150 kg)

Career information
- High school: Greater Atlanta Christian School (Norcross, Georgia)
- College: Vanderbilt (2016–2019); Georgia Tech (2021)
- NFL draft: 2022: undrafted

Career history
- Cincinnati Bengals (2022–2025); Detroit Lions (2025–present)

Career NFL statistics as of 2025
- Games played: 9
- Games started: 1
- Stats at Pro Football Reference

Devin Cochran (born July 17, 1998) is an American professional football offensive tackle for the Detroit Lions of the National Football League (NFL). He played college football for the Vanderbilt Commodores and Georgia Tech Yellow Jackets.

== Early life ==
Cochran was born on July 17, 1998, in Norcross, Georgia. He attended Greater Atlanta Christian School in Norcross, being a two-year starter as an offensive tackle and a first-team all-state selection as a senior, helping the football team reach the state championship in 2014 and the state semifinals in 2015. A three-star recruit, he committed to play college football for the Vanderbilt Commodores.

== College career ==
Cochran redshirted as a freshman at Vanderbilt in 2016. He won a starting role in 2017, starting all 10 games that year. In 2018, he started all 13 games, being named to the Southeastern Conference (SEC) honor roll while helping Vanderbilt compile the second-most rushing yards in team history. He missed the first three games of the 2019 season due to injury, then started the final nine games at left tackle. He entered the NCAA transfer portal following the 2019 season, concluding his stint at Vanderbilt having started 32 games.

Cochran announced his transfer to the Georgia Tech Yellow Jackets for a final season in 2020. However, he later decided not to enroll at the school that year. He decided to play for Georgia Tech in 2021. He started all 12 games at left tackle in the 2021 season, being a team captain and an honorable mention All-Atlantic Coast Conference (ACC) selection. He was invited to the East–West Shrine Bowl at the conclusion of his collegiate career.

== Professional career ==
Pre-draft measurables
| Height | Weight | Arm length | Hand span | Wingspan | 40-yard dash | 10-yard split | 20-yard split | 20-yard shuttle | Three-cone drill | Vertical jump | Broad jump | Bench press |
|---|---|---|---|---|---|---|---|---|---|---|---|---|
| 6 ft 7 1/8 in (2.01 m) | 306 lb (139 kg) | 35 3/8 in (0.90 m) | 10 1/4 in (0.26 m) | 7 ft 2 1/4 in (2.19 m) | 5.10 s | 1.76 s | 2.99 s | 4.71 s | 7.64 s | 30.0 in (0.76 m) | 9 ft 4 in (2.84 m) | 23 reps |
All values from Pro Day

=== Cincinnati Bengals ===
Although projected to be selected in the later rounds of the 2022 NFL draft, Cochran ended up going unselected. Following the draft, he signed with the Cincinnati Bengals as an undrafted free agent. Cochran was released at the final roster cuts, on August 30, 2022. He was re-signed to the team's practice squad the following day. After having spent the entire season on the practice squad, Cochrane signed a reserve/future contract with the Bengals on January 23, 2023. He was placed on the reserve/physically unable to perform (PUP) list on July 23, and then on injured reserve on July 30.

Cochrane was released by Cincinnati on August 27, 2024, and subsequently re-signed with the team on a practice agreement the following day. He was elevated to the active roster for the team's Week 9 game against the Las Vegas Raiders and made his NFL debut in the game. Cochrane was signed to the active roster on November 29.

On August 26, 2025, Cochran was waived by the Bengals as part of final roster cuts; he was re-signed to the team's practice squad the next day, but was released the following day.

=== Detroit Lions ===
On September 9, 2025, Cochran was signed to the Detroit Lions' practice squad. He signed a reserve/future contract with Detroit on January 5, 2026.

On August 30, 2026, Cochran was waived by the Lions as a part of final roster cuts; he was re-signed to the team's practice squad the following day.
