= Myles Adams =

American football player (born 1998)

No. 96 – Los Angeles Chargers
- Position: Defensive end
- Roster status: Practice squad

Personal information
- Born: March 9, 1998 (age 28); Arlington, Texas, U.S.
- Listed height: 6 ft 2 in (1.88 m)
- Listed weight: 299 lb (136 kg)

Career information
- High school: Mansfield Summit (Arlington)
- College: Rice (2016–2019)
- NFL draft: 2020: undrafted

Career history
- Carolina Panthers (2020)*; Seattle Seahawks (2020–2024); Detroit Lions (2024–2025); Los Angeles Chargers (2026–present)
- * Offseason or practice squad member only

Awards and highlights
- Third-team All-C-USA (2019)

Career NFL statistics as of 2025
- Total tackles: 34
- Sacks: 2.0
- Pass deflections: 1
- Stats at Pro Football Reference

Myles Adams (born March 9, 1998) is an American professional football defensive end for the Los Angeles Chargers of the National Football League (NFL). He played college football for the Rice Owls.

== Early life ==
During his attendance at Mansfield Summit High School, Adams played in 22 games and had 43 total tackles, 9 tackles for loss, 7.5 sacks, 8 quarterback hurries, 1 interception, and 1 pass deflection.

== College career ==
In his 2016 freshman season, Adams appeared in 10 games, in which he recorded 9 tackles, 1 tackle for loss, 1 sack, and 1 forced fumble.

In his 2017 sophomore season, Adams appeared in 12 games, in which he recorded 16 tackles and 1 tackle for loss.

In his 2018 junior season, Adams appeared in 13 games and made 5 starts, in which he recorded 27 tackles, 5 tackles for loss, 2.5 sacks, and 2 forced fumbles.

In his 2019 senior season, Adams appeared in and started all 12 games, in which he recorded 42 tackles, 3.5 tackles for loss, 1 sack, and 1 pass deflection. During this season, he was one of the team captains. He was named Third-team All-Conference USA and was a semifinalist for the William V. Campbell Trophy.

== Professional career ==
Pre-draft measurables
Height	Weight
6 ft 1 5/8 in (1.87 m)	285 lb (129 kg)
Values from Pro Day

=== Carolina Panthers ===
Adams went undrafted in the 2020 NFL draft. On April 30, 2020, Adams was signed by the Carolina Panthers as an undrafted free agent. He was waived on September 5, before being re–signed to their practice squad the next day. Adams was released from the practice squad on September 18.

=== Seattle Seahawks ===
On December 2, 2020, Adams was signed by the Seattle Seahawks and placed on their practice squad.

On August 31, 2021, Adams was waived by the Seahawks and re-signed to the practice squad the next day. On December 21, Adams made his NFL debut in the team's week 15 game against the Los Angeles Rams. He signed a reserve/future contract with the Seahawks on January 10, 2022.

Adams was waived by the Seahawks on November 26, 2024, and re-signed to the practice squad.

=== Detroit Lions ===
On November 30, 2024, Adams was signed by the Detroit Lions off the Seahawks practice squad.

Adams was released by the Lions on August 26, 2025 as part of final roster cuts, and re-signed to the practice squad.

On March 19, 2026, Adams re-signed with the Lions. On August 30, he was released by the Lions as a part of final roster cuts.

=== Los Angeles Chargers ===
On September 30, 2026, Adams was signed to the Los Angeles Chargers' practice squad.
