= Steven Stilianos =

American football player (born 2000)

No. 86 – Orlando Storm
- Position: Tight end
- Roster status: Active

Personal information
- Born: February 25, 2000 (age 26); Newport News, Virginia, U.S.
- Listed height: 6 ft 5 in (1.96 m)
- Listed weight: 251 lb (114 kg)

Career information
- High school: Christchurch School (Christchurch, Virginia)
- College: Lafayette (2018–2021); Iowa (2022–2023)
- NFL draft: 2024: undrafted

Career history
- Tennessee Titans (2024)*; San Antonio Brahmas (2025); Detroit Lions (2025)*; Orlando Storm (2026–present)
- * Offseason or practice squad member only

Awards and highlights
- 2× First-team All-Patriot League (2020–21, 2021)

Career UFL statistics as of 2026
- Receptions: 21
- Receiving yards: 145
- Receiving touchdowns: 1

Steven Stilianos (born February 25, 2000) is an American professional football tight end for the Orlando Storm of the United Football League (UFL). He played college football for the Lafayette Leopards and Iowa Hawkeyes. After going undrafted in the 2024 NFL draft, Stilianos then signed with the Tennessee Titans. He later played for the UFL's San Antonio Brahmas and spent time with the Detroit Lions.

== Early life ==
Stilianos was born on February 25, 2000, in Newport News, Virginia. He attended Christchurch School in Virginia, where he played quarterback and defensive line. As a senior, he was named the Virginia Independent Schools Athletic Association Division II Player of the Year and earned first-team all-state honors as a defensive lineman. He helped the school win the 2017 VISAA state football championship before playing collegiately at Lafayette and Iowa.

== College career ==
=== Lafayette ===
Stilianos began his college career at Lafayette College in 2018. As a freshman, he played in 11 games with six starts and recorded 14 receptions for 102 yards and one touchdown. In 2019, he started nine of 11 games and caught 21 passes for 177 yards.

During Lafayette's spring 2021 season, Stilianos started every game and recorded nine receptions for 125 yards and four touchdowns. He was named Lafayette's offensive most valuable player and earned first-team All-Patriot League honors at tight end.

On April 10, 2021, Stilianos caught two touchdown passes against Lehigh in the 156th meeting of college football's most-played rivalry. His 30-yard touchdown reception early in the fourth quarter broke a 13–13 tie and proved to be the game-winning score in Lafayette's 20–13 victory. He was named the game's most valuable player.

Stilianos again earned first-team All-Patriot League honors during the fall 2021 season. He played in four games and caught 21 passes for 130 yards.

He finished his Lafayette career with 65 receptions for 534 yards and five touchdowns.

=== Iowa ===
Stilianos transferred to the University of Iowa as a graduate transfer in 2022. He appeared in eight games during his first season with the Hawkeyes without recording a reception.

In 2023, injuries to Iowa tight ends Luke Lachey and Erick All moved Stilianos into a larger role in the offense. He eventually became Iowa's starting tight end. He played in 13 games with eight starts and finished the season with eight receptions for 96 yards. He received Iowa's Coaches Appreciation Award for offense.

Against Nebraska in the 2023 regular-season finale, Stilianos caught a 37-yard pass to the one-yard line that set up Iowa's first touchdown in a 13–10 victory.

Stilianos graduated from Iowa in December 2023 with a degree in sustainable development.

== Professional career ==
=== Tennessee Titans ===
After going unselected in the 2024 NFL draft, Stilianos signed with the Tennessee Titans as an undrafted free agent on May 10, 2024. He competed for a roster spot during training camp but did not appear in a regular-season game.

=== San Antonio Brahmas ===
Stilianos joined the San Antonio Brahmas of the United Football League for the 2025 season. He appeared in nine games, catching 15 passes for 86 yards and one touchdown. He also completed a 38-yard touchdown pass on his only passing attempt.

=== Detroit Lions ===
Following the 2025 UFL season, Stilianos signed with the Detroit Lions. Pride of Detroit described him primarily as an in-line blocking tight end and noted his unusual background as a former high school quarterback, including a touchdown pass he threw on a trick play with San Antonio.

=== Orlando Storm ===
Stilianos joined the Orlando Storm for the 2026 UFL season. He appeared in 10 games and caught six passes for 59 yards.

== Career statistics ==
=== UFL ===
Year	Team	GP	Receiving			
Year	Team	GP	Rec	Yds	Avg	TD
2025	San Antonio Brahmas	9	15	86	5.7	1
2026	Orlando Storm	10	6	59	9.8	0
Career		19	21	145	6.9	1
