= Michael Niese =

American football player (born 1998)

No. 64 – Los Angeles Rams
- Position: Center
- Roster status: Practice squad

Personal information
- Born: January 13, 1998 (age 28); St. Louis, Missouri, U.S.
- Listed height: 6 ft 5 in (1.96 m)
- Listed weight: 300 lb (136 kg)

Career information
- High school: St. Louis University High (St. Louis, Missouri)
- College: Dayton (2016–2019); Temple (2020–2021)
- NFL draft: 2022: undrafted

Career history
- Denver Broncos (2022)*; Chicago Bears (2022)*; Tampa Bay Buccaneers (2023)*; Detroit Lions (2023–2025); Los Angeles Rams (2026–present)*
- * Offseason or practice squad member only

Career NFL statistics as of 2025
- Games played: 26
- Stats at Pro Football Reference

Michael Henry Niese (born January 13, 1998) is an American professional football center for the Los Angeles Rams of the National Football League (NFL). He played college football for the Dayton Flyers and Temple Owls.

== Professional career ==
Pre-draft measurables
Height	Weight	Arm length	Hand span	Wingspan	40-yard dash	10-yard split	20-yard split	20-yard shuttle	Three-cone drill	Vertical jump	Broad jump	Bench press
6 ft 3 1/4 in (1.91 m)	303 lb (137 kg)	32 3/8 in (0.82 m)	9 5/8 in (0.24 m)	6 ft 7 5/8 in (2.02 m)	5.04 s	1.62 s	2.89 s	4.56 s	7.46 s	29.5 in (0.75 m)	8 ft 7 in (2.62 m)	23 reps
All values from Pro Day

=== Denver Broncos ===
On June 9, 2022, Niese was signed to the Denver Broncos as an undrafted free agent after going unselected in the 2022 NFL draft. He was waived by the Broncos on August 30.

=== Chicago Bears ===
On September 12, 2022, Niese was signed to the practice squad of the Chicago Bears.

=== Tampa Bay Buccaneers ===
On January 18, 2023, Niese signed a reserve/future contract with the Tampa Bay Buccaneers. He was waived by the Buccaneers on August 29.

=== Detroit Lions ===
On August 31, 2023, Niese was signed to the practice squad of the Detroit Lions. He made his NFL debut in Week 11 of in a victory over the Chicago Bears. Niese signed a reserve/future contract with Detroit on January 30, 2024.

On April 22, 2025, Niese re-signed with the Lions. He was waived on August 26 as part of final roster cuts, and re-signed to the practice squad. Niese was promoted to the active roster on November 15, ultimately playing in eight games for the team.

On January 5, 2026, the Lions signed Niese to a one-year contract extension. On August 30, he was waived by Detroit with an injury designation as part of final roster cuts.

=== Los Angeles Rams ===
On November 21, 2026, Niese signed with the Los Angeles Rams practice squad.
