= Luke Deal =

American football player (born 2001)

Profile
- Position: Tight end

Personal information
- Born: February 14, 2001 (age 25); Greenwood, South Carolina, U.S.
- Listed height: 6 ft 5 in (1.96 m)
- Listed weight: 252 lb (114 kg)

Career information
- High school: Emerald (Greenwood, South Carolina)
- College: Auburn (2019–2024)
- NFL draft: 2025: undrafted

Career history
- Detroit Lions (2025)*
- * Offseason or practice squad member only

Luke Deal (born February 14, 2001) is an American professional football tight end. He played college football for the Auburn Tigers.

== Early life ==
Deal attended Emerald High School in Greenwood, South Carolina. Coming out of high school, he was rated as a three-star recruit and the 18th best tight end, and committed to play college football for the Auburn Tigers over offers from schools such as Clemson, Notre Dame, Michigan, Ohio State and North Carolina State.

== College career ==
Heading into the 2023 season, Deal was named one of the four team captains for the Tigers. Instead of declaring for the 2024 NFL draft, he returned to play his final collegiate season with the Tigers for 2024. Deal finished his six-year career with the Tigers from 2019 to 2024 with 17 receptions for 116 yards and two touchdowns in 64 games. He was a two-time captain and a semifinalist for the Jason Witten Man of the Year award.

== Professional career ==
Pre-draft measurables
Height	Weight	Arm length	Hand span	40-yard dash	10-yard split	20-yard split	20-yard shuttle	Three-cone drill	Vertical jump	Broad jump	Bench press
6 ft 5 in (1.96 m)	247 lb (112 kg)	31 5/8 in (0.80 m)	10 1/8 in (0.26 m)	5.14 s	1.79 s	3.01 s	4.47 s	7.39 s	29.5 in (0.75 m)	9 ft 3 in (2.82 m)	24 reps
All values from Pro Day

After not being selected in the 2025 NFL draft, Deal signed with the Detroit Lions as an undrafted free agent. On July 29, 2025, he was waived with an injury settlement.

== Personal life ==
Deal is married to his wife Ansley, where they have one child.
