= 2024 Detroit Lions season =

95th season in franchise history

- Owner: Sheila Ford Hamp
- General manager: Brad Holmes
- Head coach: Dan Campbell
- Home stadium: Ford Field

Results
- Record: 15–2
- Division place: 1st NFC North
- Playoffs: Lost Divisional Playoffs (vs. Commanders) 31–45
- All-Pros: 6: WR Amon-Ra St. Brown (1st team); RT Penei Sewell (1st team); S Kerby Joseph (1st team); P Jack Fox (1st team); PR Kalif Raymond (2nd team); C Frank Ragnow (2nd team)
- Pro Bowlers: 8: QB Jared Goff; RB Jahmyr Gibbs; WR Amon-Ra St. Brown; T Penei Sewell; T Taylor Decker; C Frank Ragnow; SS Brian Branch; P Jack Fox

Uniform
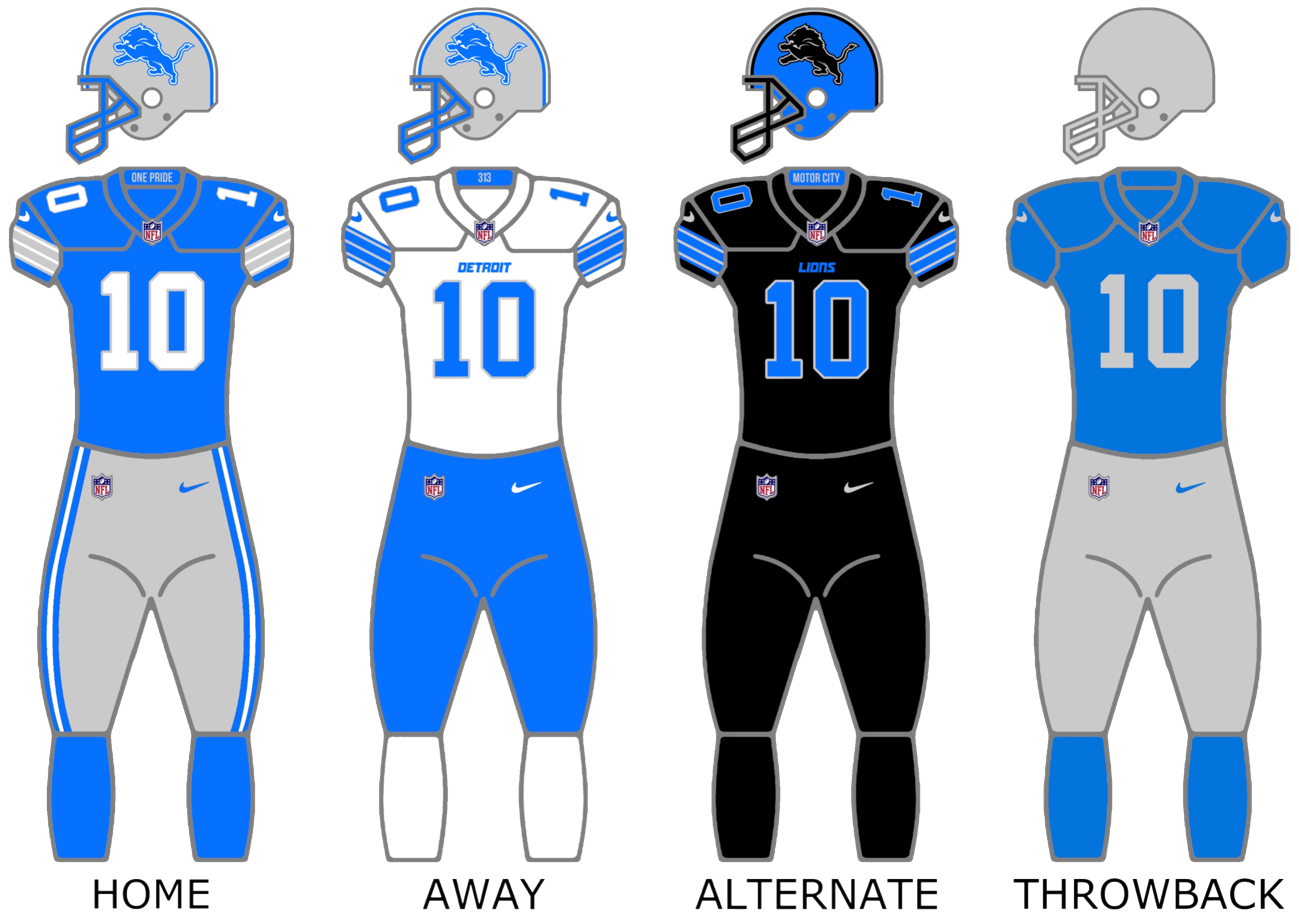

The 2024 season was the Detroit Lions' 95th in the National Football League (NFL), their 91st in Detroit, and their fourth under the head coach/general manager tandem of Dan Campbell and Brad Holmes. They improved on their 12–5 record from the previous season and defended their NFC North title. After a blowout week 11 win against the Jacksonville Jaguars, they secured their third consecutive winning season for the first time since 1995. With their week 12 victory against the Indianapolis Colts, the Lions became the first team to reach 10 wins in the 2024 season, making this the first time a Lions team had accomplished this feat since 1934, as well as their first consecutive 10+ win seasons in franchise history. In Week 13, the Lions won their first Thanksgiving game since 2016.

After a win against the Minnesota Vikings in the final game of the regular season, the Lions won their second consecutive division title and clinched the No. 1 seed in the NFC for the first time in franchise history. They swept the NFC North for the first time, which was the best single-season division in NFL history by combined winning percentage. The Lions were also the only team in the 2024 season who swept their division, and became the first team to go undefeated in the NFC North since the 2019 Green Bay Packers. The Lions finished the regular season with a franchise record 15–2 record, tied for the most wins in the 2024 season with the Kansas City Chiefs. Their two losses of the season (to the Buccaneers and Bills) were by a combined 10 points. The Lions became the second team to win 15 games since the 2015 Carolina Panthers after the Chiefs, and the first NFC team to do so. They also became the first team in franchise history to go undefeated on the road. They entered the playoffs as the favorite to win Super Bowl LIX. However, their season was derailed by defensive injuries and ended in a shocking 45–31 upset loss to the Washington Commanders in the Divisional Round of the playoffs. They became the sixth consecutive team with 15 wins in the regular season to fail to win the Super Bowl, and the second to not win a playoff game, after rival 2011 Green Bay Packers. The Lions would later be joined by the Chiefs, who, after losing Super Bowl LIX to the Philadelphia Eagles, became the seventh 15-win team to fail to win the Super Bowl.

The focal point of the Lions' success was their offense; their 564 total points scored were the most in the NFL in 2024, and the fourth-most ever in a regular season, and their 33.2 points scored per game were the 12th highest of any team since the AFL-NFL merger. Their +222 point differential was the highest in the NFL in 2024, as well as the 25th highest of all time. Pro Bowler Jahmyr Gibbs paired with David Montgomery to form a running back tandem before Montgomery got injured against the Bills, scoring a franchise record and league-leading 20 touchdowns. Meanwhile, the Lions defense finished the regular season 7th in fewest points allowed despite several injuries to key players that restricted their playoff run, including Pro Bowl defensive end Aidan Hutchinson.

The Lions debuted updated uniforms with a classic font including a new alternate consisting of blue lettering on black jerseys and matching black pants and black socks and a blue helmet with a black lion graphic. After the season, both of the Lions coordinators, offensive coordinator Ben Johnson and defensive coordinator Aaron Glenn left to become head coaches. Johnson went on to become head coach of the NFC North rival Bears while Glenn went on to become the Jets head coach.

== Player movements ==
=== Free agents ===
Position	Player	Free agency tag	Date signed	2024 team	Source
OG	Kayode Awosika	ERFA	March 13	Detroit Lions	
DT	Tyson Alualu	UFA			
K	Michael Badgley	UFA	February 22	Detroit Lions	
FB	Jason Cabinda	UFA			
LS	Scott Daly	UFA	March 15	Detroit Lions	
CB	Khalil Dorsey	RFA	March 14	Detroit Lions	
TE	Zach Ertz	UFA	March 12	Washington Commanders	
TE	Anthony Firkser	UFA	July 30	New York Jets	
S	C. J. Gardner-Johnson	UFA	March 14	Philadelphia Eagles	
G	Graham Glasgow	UFA	March 13	Detroit Lions	
DE	Charles Harris	UFA	September 11	Carolina Panthers	
CB	Will Harris	UFA	May 1	New Orleans Saints	
OLB	James Houston	ERFA	March 13	Detroit Lions	
RB	Mohamed Ibrahim	UFA	August 22	Minnesota Vikings	
G	Jonah Jackson	UFA	March 14	Los Angeles Rams	
CB	Jerry Jacobs	RFA	July 27	Los Angeles Rams	
DT	Benito Jones	RFA	March 18	Miami Dolphins	
RB	Zonovan Knight	ERFA	March 7	Detroit Lions	
CB	Chase Lucas	ERFA	March 18	San Francisco 49ers	
OLB	Jalen Reeves-Maybin	UFA	February 27	Detroit Lions	
LS	Jake McQuaide	UFA	October 15	Chicago Bears	
CB	Emmanuel Moseley	UFA	March 7	Detroit Lions	
OT	Matt Nelson	UFA	March 21	New York Giants	
WR	Donovan Peoples-Jones	UFA	March 18	Detroit Lions	
OLB	Anthony Pittman	RFA	March 14	Washington Commanders	
RB	Craig Reynolds	ERFA	March 10	Detroit Lions	
WR	Josh Reynolds	UFA	March 28	Denver Broncos	
OT	Dan Skipper	UFA	March 14	Detroit Lions	
QB	Nate Sudfeld	UFA	March 27	Detroit Lions	
G	Halapoulivaati Vaitai	UFA			
CB	Kindle Vildor	UFA	April 3	Detroit Lions	
TE	Brock Wright	RFA	April 3	Detroit Lions	
TE	Shane Zylstra	RFA	March 4	Detroit Lions	

=== Additions ===
Position	Player	Previous team	Date	Source
G	Netane Muti	Las Vegas Raiders	February 6	
WR	Tre'Quan Smith	Denver Broncos	February 7	
LB	Mathieu Betts	BC Lions (CFL)	February 13	
DE	Marcus Davenport	Minnesota Vikings	March 14	
CB	Carlton Davis	Tampa Bay Buccaneers	March 13	
TE	Parker Hesse	Atlanta Falcons	March 13	
CB	Amik Robertson	Las Vegas Raiders	March 14	
DT	D. J. Reader	Cincinnati Bengals	March 14	
G	Kevin Zeitler	Baltimore Ravens	March 18	
WR	Kaden Davis	Arizona Cardinals	May 13	
LB	Ben Niemann	Denver Broncos	June 10	
K	Jake Bates	Michigan Panthers (UFL)	June 18	
DT	David Bada	Washington Commanders	July 25	
OG	Jake Burton	Michigan Panthers (UFL)	July 31	
QB	Jake Fromm	Washington Commanders	August 12	
LB	Trevor Nowaske	Arizona Cardinals	August 27	

=== Trades ===
- On March 13, the Lions acquired cornerback Carlton Davis, a sixth-round pick in the 2024 NFL draft, and a sixth-round pick in the 2025 NFL draft from the Tampa Bay Buccaneers in exchange for a third-round pick in the 2024 NFL draft, which Tampa Bay used to select Jalen McMillan.
- On November 5, the Lions acquired defensive end Za'Darius Smith and a 7th round pick in the 2026 NFL draft from the Cleveland Browns in exchange for a 5th and 6th round pick in the 2026 NFL Draft.

=== Releases ===
Position	Player	2024 team	Release date	Source
S	Tracy Walker	San Francisco 49ers	February 20	
CB	Cameron Sutton	Pittsburgh Steelers	March 21	
WR	Antoine Green	Detroit Lions	August 12	
LS	Scott Daly	Chicago Bears	August 26	
RB	Zonovan Knight	New York Jets	August 26	
QB	Nate Sudfeld		August 27	
CB	Steven Gilmore Jr.		August 27	
WR	Maurice Alexander	Detroit Lions	August 27	
TE	Parker Hesse		November 2	
WR	Isaiah Williams	Cincinnati Bengals	November 7	
LB	James Houston	Cleveland Browns	November 26	

=== Retirements ===
Position	Player	Date retired	Source
QB	Teddy Bridgewater	February 2, 2024	
QB	David Blough	February 15, 2024	
DE	Romeo Okwara	March 19, 2024	
OG	Michael Schofield	September 5, 2024	

== Draft ==
Detroit hosted the draft this year and recorded the highest attendance ever with over 700,000 visitors for the three-day event.

2024 Detroit Lions draft selections
Round	Selection	Player	Position	College	Notes	Source
1	24	Terrion Arnold	CB	Alabama	From Cowboys (Note: The Lions traded first- and third-round selections (29th and 73rd overall) to the Dallas Cowboys in exchange for a first-round selection (24th overall) and a 2025 seventh-round selection.)	
1	29	Traded to the Dallas Cowboys				
2	61	Ennis Rakestraw Jr.	CB	Missouri		
3	73	Traded to the Dallas Cowboys			From Vikings (Note: The Lions traded a conditional fourth-round selection (that would have been downgraded to a fifth if the Vikings won a playoff game in 2022), a 2023 fourth-round selection and TE T. J. Hockenson to the Minnesota Vikings in exchange for a third-round selection (73rd overall) and a 2023 second-round selection.)	
3	92	Traded to the Tampa Bay Buccaneers (Note: The Lions traded a third-round selection (92nd overall) to the Tampa Bay Buccaneers in exchange for a sixth-round selection (201st overall), a 2025 sixth-round selection and CB Carlton Davis.)				
4	126	Giovanni Manu	OT	UBC	From Packers via Jets (Note: The Lions traded a 2025 third-round selection to the New York Jets in exchange for a fourth-round selection (126th overall).)	
4	129	Traded to the Minnesota Vikings				
4	132	Sione Vaki	RB	Utah	Compensatory selection; from 49ers via Eagles (Note: The Lions traded fifth- and sixth-round selections (164th and 201st overall), and a 2025 fourth-round selection to the Philadelphia Eagles in exchange for fourth- and sixth-round selections (132nd and 210th overall).)	
5	164	Traded to the Philadelphia Eagles				
6	189	Mekhi Wingo	DT	LSU	From Broncos via Rams, Bills and Texans (Note: The Lions traded sixth- and seventh-round selections (205th and 249th overall) to the Houston Texans in exchange for a sixth-round selection (189th overall).)	
6	201	Traded to the Philadelphia Eagles			From Buccaneers	
6	205	Traded to the Houston Texans				
6	210	Christian Mahogany	G	Boston College	Compensatory selection; from Eagles	
7	249	Traded to the Houston Texans				

Draft trades

2024 Detroit Lions undrafted free agents
Name	Position	College	Ref.
Jalon Calhoun	WR	Duke	
Steele Chambers	LB	Ohio State	
Duke Clemens	C	UCLA	
Kingsley Eguakun	C	Florida	
Chelen Garnes	S	Wake Forest	
DaRon Gilbert	LB	Northern Illinois	
Hogan Hatten	LS	Idaho	
Bryan Hudson	C	Louisville	
Nate Lynn	OLB	William & Mary	
Morice Norris Jr.	CB	Fresno State	
Isaac Rex	TE	BYU	
Loren Strickland	S	Ball State	
James Turner	K	Michigan	
Isaac Ukwu	OLB	Ole Miss	
Isaiah Williams	WR	Illinois	

== Staff ==
2024 Detroit Lions staff
Front office: Owner – Sheila Ford Hamp; Vice chairpeople – William Clay Ford Jr., Martha Ford Morse, Elizabeth Ford Kontulis; Team president/CEO – Rod Wood; Executive vice president & general manager – Brad Holmes; Chief operating officer – Mike Disner; Special assistant/chairperson – Chris Spielman; Assistant general manager – Ray Agnew; Director of scouting – Dwayne Joseph; Director of college scouting – Brian Hudspeth; Director of scouting advancement – Mike Martin; Director of pro scouting – Rob Lohman; Senior personnel executive – John Dorsey; Head coaches: Head coach – Dan Campbell; Assistant head coach/running backs – Scottie Montgomery; Offensive coaches: Offensive coordinator – Ben Johnson; Passing game coordinator – Tanner Engstrand; Quarterbacks – Mark Brunell; Assistant quarterbacks – J. T. Barrett; Wide receivers – Antwaan Randle El; Assistant wide receivers – Seth Ryan; Tight ends – Steve Heiden; Offensive line – Hank Fraley; Assistant offensive line – Steve Oliver	Defensive coaches: Defensive coordinator – Aaron Glenn; Run game coordinator/defensive line – Terrell Williams; Assistant defensive line – Cameron Davis; Linebackers – Kelvin Sheppard; Assistant linebackers – Shaun Dion Hamilton; Passing game coordinator/defensive backs – Deshea Townsend; Defensive assistant/outside linebackers – David Corrao; Defensive assistant – Jim O'Neil; WCF minority coaching assistant/defensive quality control – Dré Thompson; Special teams coaches: Special teams coordinator – Dave Fipp; Assistant special teams – Jett Modkins; Strength and conditioning: Director of sports performance – Mike Clark; Director of sports science – Jill Costanza; Head strength & conditioning – Josh Schuler; Assistant strength & conditioning – Morris Henry

== Final roster ==
2024 Detroit Lions roster
Quarterbacks (QB): 12 Teddy Bridgewater; 16 Jared Goff; 2 Hendon Hooker; Running backs (RB): 26 Jahmyr Gibbs; 5 David Montgomery; 13 Craig Reynolds; 33 Sione Vaki; Wide receivers (WR): 17 Tim Patrick; 11 Kalif Raymond; 8 Allen Robinson; 14 Amon-Ra St. Brown; 9 Jameson Williams; Tight ends (TE): 87 Sam LaPorta; 89 Brock Wright; 84 Shane Zylstra	Offensive linemen (OL): 74 Kayode Awosika G; 68 Taylor Decker T; 60 Graham Glasgow G/C; 73 Christian Mahogany G; 59 Giovanni Manu T; 62 Michael Niese C; 77 Frank Ragnow C; 58 Penei Sewell T; 70 Dan Skipper T; 75 Colby Sorsdal T; 71 Kevin Zeitler G; Defensive linemen (DL): 66 Myles Adams DT; 50 Mitchell Agude DE; 96 Brodric Martin DT; 69 Al-Quadin Muhammad DE; 95 Pat O'Connor DT; 91 Levi Onwuzurike DT; 93 Josh Paschal DE; 98 D. J. Reader DT; 99 Za'Darius Smith DE; 78 Jonah Williams DE	Linebackers (LB): 34 Alex Anzalone OLB; 46 Jack Campbell OLB; 51 Ben Niemann OLB; 53 Trevor Nowaske MLB; 41 Anthony Pittman OLB; 42 Jalen Reeves-Maybin OLB; 47 Ezekiel Turner MLB; Defensive backs (DB): 0 Terrion Arnold CB; 32 Brian Branch SS; 31 Kerby Joseph FS; 6 Ifeatu Melifonwu SS; 40 Morice Norris FS; 21 Amik Robertson CB; 29 Kindle Vildor CB; Special teams (ST): 39 Jake Bates K; 3 Jack Fox P; 49 Hogan Hatten LS	Practice squad: 10 Kwon Alexander MLB; 1 Maurice Alexander WR; 48 Abraham Beauplan MLB; 65 Kingsley Eguakun C; 18 Jake Fromm QB; 43 DaRon Gilbert OLB; 36 Erick Hallett SS; 28 Jermar Jefferson RB; 72 Jamarco Jones T; 85 Tom Kennedy WR; 82 James Mitchell TE; 19 Donovan Peoples-Jones WR; 90 Chris Smith DT; 24 Loren Strickland SS; 38 Stantley Thomas-Oliver III CB; 45 Isaac Ukwu DE; Reserve: -- Michael Badgley K (IR); 55 Derrick Barnes MLB (IR); 79 John Cominsky DE (IR); 92 Marcus Davenport DE (IR); 23 Carlton Davis CB (IR); 30 Khalil Dorsey CB (IR); 76 Connor Galvin T (IR); 80 Antoine Green WR (IR); 97 Aidan Hutchinson DE (IR); 57 Nate Lynn OLB (IR); 54 Alim McNeill DT (IR); 4 Emmanuel Moseley CB (NF-Ill.); 52 Netane Muti G (IR); 96 Kyle Peko DT (IR); 15 Ennis Rakestraw Jr. CB (IR); 44 Malcolm Rodriguez MLB (IR); 94 Mekhi Wingo DT (IR); Rookies in italics 53 active, 17 reserve, 16 practice squad

== Preseason ==
Week	Date	Opponent	Result	Record	Venue	Recap
1	August 8	at New York Giants	L 3–14	0–1	MetLife Stadium	Recap
2	August 17	at Kansas City Chiefs	W 24–23	1–1	Arrowhead Stadium	Recap
3	August 24	Pittsburgh Steelers	W 24–17	2–1	Ford Field	Recap

== Regular season ==
=== Schedule ===
Week	Date	Opponent	Result	Record	Venue	Recap
1	September 8	Los Angeles Rams	**W** 26–20 (OT)	1–0	Ford Field	Recap
2	September 15	Tampa Bay Buccaneers	**L** 16–20	1–1	Ford Field	Recap
3	September 22	at Arizona Cardinals	**W** 20–13	2–1	State Farm Stadium	Recap
4	September 30	Seattle Seahawks	**W** 42–29	3–1	Ford Field	Recap
5	Bye					
6	October 13	at Dallas Cowboys	**W** 47–9	4–1	AT&T Stadium	Recap
7	October 20	at **Minnesota Vikings**	**W** 31–29	5–1	U.S. Bank Stadium	Recap
8	October 27	Tennessee Titans	**W** 52–14	6–1	Ford Field	Recap
9	November 3	at **Green Bay Packers**	**W** 24–14	7–1	Lambeau Field	Recap
10	November 10	at Houston Texans	**W** 26–23	8–1	NRG Stadium	Recap
11	November 17	Jacksonville Jaguars	**W** 52–6	9–1	Ford Field	Recap
12	November 24	at Indianapolis Colts	**W** 24–6	10–1	Lucas Oil Stadium	Recap
13	November 28	**Chicago Bears**	**W** 23–20	11–1	Ford Field	Recap
14	December 5	**Green Bay Packers**	**W** 34–31	12–1	Ford Field	Recap
15	December 15	Buffalo Bills	**L** 42–48	12–2	Ford Field	Recap
16	December 22	at **Chicago Bears**	**W** 34–17	13–2	Soldier Field	Recap
17	December 30	at San Francisco 49ers	**W** 40–34	14–2	Levi's Stadium	Recap
18	January 5	**Minnesota Vikings**	**W** 31–9	15–2	Ford Field	Recap

Note: Intra-division opponents are in bold text.

=== Game summaries ===
==== Week 1: vs. Los Angeles Rams ====
Week 1: Los Angeles Rams at Detroit Lions – Game summary

Quarter	1	2	3	4	OT	Total
Rams	3	0	7	10	0	**20**
**Lions**	0	10	7	3	6	**26**

at Ford Field, Detroit, Michigan

- Date: September 8
- Game time: 8:20 p.m. EDT
- Game weather: None (indoor stadium)
- Game attendance: 66,530
- Referee: Adrian Hill
- TV announcers (NBC): Mike Tirico, Cris Collinsworth and Melissa Stark
- Recap, Game Book

Game information

**First quarter**

- LAR – Joshua Karty 41-yard field goal, 4:50. Rams 3–0. **Drive: 13 plays, 67 yards, 6:30.**

**Second quarter**

- DET – Jake Bates 25-yard field goal, 12:17. Tied 3–3. **Drive: 15 plays, 63 yards, 7:33.**
- DET – Jahmyr Gibbs 1-yard run (Jake Bates kick), 1:57. Lions 10–3. **Drive: 9 plays, 77 yards, 4:34.**

**Third quarter**

- DET – Jameson Williams 52-yard pass from Jared Goff (Jake Bates kick), 10:29. Lions 17–3. **Drive: 3 plays, 59 yards, 1:32.**
- LAR – Kyren Williams 2-yard run (Joshua Karty kick), 3:33. Lions 17–10. **Drive: 11 plays, 70 yards, 6:56.**

**Fourth quarter**

- LAR – Joshua Karty 26-yard field goal, 12:32. Lions 17–13. **Drive: 7 plays, 76 yards, 3:59.**
- LAR – Cooper Kupp 9-yard pass from Matthew Stafford (Joshua Karty kick), 4:30. Rams 20–17. **Drive: 10 plays, 80 yards, 4:39.**
- DET – Jake Bates 32-yard field goal, 0:17. Tied 20–20. **Drive: 9 plays, 55 yards, 1:54.**

**Overtime**

- DET – David Montgomery 1-yard run, 5:19. Lions 26–20. **Drive: 8 plays, 70 yards, 4:41.**

**Top passers**

- LAR – Matthew Stafford – 34/49, 317 yards, TD, INT
- DET – Jared Goff – 18/28, 217 yards, TD, INT

**Top rushers**

- LAR – Kyren Williams – 18 rushes, 50 yards, TD
- DET – David Montgomery – 17 rushes, 91 yards, TD

**Top receivers**

- LAR – Cooper Kupp – 14 receptions, 110 yards, TD
- DET – Jameson Williams – 5 receptions, 121 yards, TD

The Lions opened the regular season at home against the Los Angeles Rams, in a rematch of the 2023 NFC Wild Card game. The Rams opened the scoring in the first quarter via a 41-yard field goal by Joshua Karty. The Lions scored ten points in the second quarter via a 25-yard field goal by Jake Bates and a one-yard touchdown run from Jahmyr Gibbs, which made the score 10–3 in favor of Detroit at half-time. The Lions extended their lead in the third quarter via a 52-yard touchdown pass from Jared Goff to Jameson Williams. The Rams responded with a two-yard touchdown run from Kyren Williams. The Rams scored ten points in the fourth quarter via a 26-yard field goal by Karty and a nine-yard touchdown pass from Matthew Stafford to Cooper Kupp, to regain the lead. The Lions responded with a 32-yard field goal by Bates with 17 seconds remaining in the game to force overtime. On the first possession of overtime, the Lions scored via a one-yard touchdown run from David Montgomery, making the final score 26–20 in favor of Detroit.

==== Week 2: vs. Tampa Bay Buccaneers ====
Week 2: Tampa Bay Buccaneers at Detroit Lions – Game summary

Quarter	1	2	3	4	Total
**Buccaneers**	6	7	7	0	**20**
Lions	3	3	10	0	**16**

at Ford Field, Detroit, Michigan

- Date: September 15
- Game time: 1:00 p.m. EDT
- Game weather: None (indoor stadium)
- Game attendance: 64,160
- Referee: Clay Martin
- TV announcers (Fox): Kevin Kugler, Daryl Johnston and Laura Okmin
- Recap, Game Book

Game information

**First quarter**

- TB – Chase McLaughlin 30-yard field goal, 11:31. Buccaneers 3–0. **Drive: 7 plays, 58 yards, 3:29.**
- TB – Chase McLaughlin 55-yard field goal, 9:00. Buccaneers 6–0. **Drive: 4 plays, 7 yards, 2:20.**
- DET – Jake Bates 22-yard field goal, 7:13. Buccaneers 6–3. **Drive: 5 plays, 67 yards, 1:47.**

**Second quarter**

- DET – Jake Bates 35-yard field goal, 12:47. Tied 6–6. **Drive: 13 plays, 67 yards, 6:49.**
- TB – Chris Godwin 41-yard pass from Baker Mayfield (Chase McLaughlin kick), 9:08. Buccaneers 13–6. **Drive: 6 plays, 70 yards, 3:39.**

**Third quarter**

- DET – Jake Bates 32-yard field goal, 11:53. Buccaneers 13–9. **Drive: 6 plays, 57 yards, 3:07.**
- DET – David Montgomery 1-yard run (Jake Bates kick), 3:26. Lions 16–13. **Drive: 12 plays, 68 yards, 6:07.**
- TB – Baker Mayfield 11-yard run (Chase McLaughlin kick), 0:34. Buccaneers 20–16. **Drive: 12 plays, 68 yards, 6:07.**

**Fourth quarter**

- No scoring plays.

**Top passers**

- TB – Baker Mayfield – 12/19, 185 yards, TD, INT
- DET – Jared Goff – 34/55, 307 yards, 2 INT

**Top rushers**

- TB – Baker Mayfield – 4 rushes, 35 yards, TD
- DET – Jahmyr Gibbs – 13 rushes, 84 yards

**Top receivers**

- TB – Chris Godwin – 7 receptions, 117 yards, TD
- DET – Amon-Ra St. Brown – 11 receptions, 119 yards

In week 2, the Lions hosted the Tampa Bay Buccaneers, in a rematch of the 2023 NFC Divisional Round game. Tampa Bay scored six points in the first quarter via two field goals by Chase McLaughlin from 30-yards, and 55-yards, respectively. The Lions responded with a 22-yard field goal by Jake Bates. The Lions scored in the second quarter via a 35-yard field goal by Bates to tie the game. The Buccaneers regained the lead via a 41-yard touchdown pass from Baker Mayfield to Chris Godwin, which made the score 13–6 in favor of Tampa Bay at half-time. The Lions scored ten points in the third quarter via a 32-yard field goal by Bates and a one-yard touchdown run from David Montgomery to take their first lead of the game. The Buccaneers responded with an 11-yard touchdown run from Mayfield to regain the lead. In a scoreless fourth quarter, the Lions' attempted comeback failed after turning the ball over on downs after three consecutive incomplete passes by Jared Goff, making the final score 20–16 in favor of Tampa Bay. Aidan Hutchinson recorded 4.5 sacks, the third player in Lions history to record four or more sacks in a game after William Gay and Keith Ferguson.

==== Week 3: at Arizona Cardinals ====
Week 3: Detroit Lions at Arizona Cardinals – Game summary

Quarter	1	2	3	4	Total
**Lions**	7	13	0	0	**20**
Cardinals	7	3	0	3	**13**

at State Farm Stadium, Glendale, Arizona

- Date: September 22
- Game time: 4:25 p.m. EDT/1:25 p.m. MST
- Game weather: None (retractable roof closed)
- Game attendance: 63,650
- Referee: Brad Rogers
- TV announcers (Fox): Chris Myers, Mark Schlereth and Jen Hale
- Recap, Game Book

Game information

**First quarter**

- DET – David Montgomery 1-yard run (Jake Bates kick), 10:16. Lions 7–0. **Drive: 9 plays, 70 yards, 4:40.**
- ARI – Marvin Harrison Jr. 10-yard pass from Kyler Murray (Matt Prater kick), 5:08. Tied 7–7. **Drive: 8 plays, 70 yards, 5:08.**

**Second quarter**

- DET – Amon-Ra St. Brown 5-yard pass from Jared Goff (kick failed, wide right), 12:27. Lions 13–7. **Drive: 13 plays, 70 yards, 7:41.**
- DET – Jahmyr Gibbs 20-yard pass from Jared Goff (Jake Bates kick), 0:29. Lions 20–7. **Drive: 7 plays, 72 yards, 3:54.**
- ARI – Matt Prater 42-yard field goal, 0:00. Lions 20–10. **Drive: 6 plays, 46 yards, 0:29.**

**Third quarter**

- No scoring plays.

**Fourth quarter**

- ARI – Matt Prater 45-yard field goal, 3:48. Lions 20–13. **Drive: 9 plays, 65 yards, 3:00.**

**Top passers**

- DET – Jared Goff – 18/23, 198 yards 2 TD, INT
- ARI – Kyler Murray – 21/34, 205 yards, TD, INT

**Top rushers**

- DET – David Montgomery – 23 rushes, 106 yards, TD
- ARI – Kyler Murray – 5 rushes, 45 yards

**Top receivers**

- DET – Amon-Ra St. Brown – 7 receptions, 74 yards, TD
- ARI – Marvin Harrison Jr. – 5 receptions, 64 yards, TD

In week 3, the Lions visited the Arizona Cardinals. The Lions opened the scoring in the first quarter via a one-yard touchdown run from David Montgomery. The Cardinals responded with a ten-yard touchdown pass from Kyler Murray to Marvin Harrison Jr. to tie the game. The Lions scored 13 points in the second quarter via a five-yard touchdown pass from Jared Goff to Amon-Ra St. Brown and a 20-yard touchdown pass from Goff to Jahmyr Gibbs. The Cardinals scored the final points of the quarter via a 42-yard field goal by Matt Prater as time expired in the first half, which made the score 20–10 in favor of Detroit at half-time. After a scoreless third quarter, the Cardinals scored the only points of the fourth quarter via a 45-yard field goal by Prater, making the final score 20–13 in favor of Detroit.

==== Week 4: vs. Seattle Seahawks ====
Week 4: Seattle Seahawks at Detroit Lions – Game summary

Quarter	1	2	3	4	Total
Seahawks	0	7	13	9	**29**
**Lions**	7	14	14	7	**42**

at Ford Field, Detroit, Michigan

- Date: September 30
- Game time: 8:15 p.m. EDT
- Game weather: None (indoor stadium)
- Game attendance: 66,658
- Referee: Alex Kemp
- TV announcers (ABC): Joe Buck, Troy Aikman and Lisa Salters
- Recap, Game Book

Game information

**First quarter**

- DET – David Montgomery 1-yard run (Jake Bates kick), 3:11. Lions 7–0. **Drive: 12 plays, 93 yards, 7:21.**

**Second quarter**

- DET – Jahmyr Gibbs 3-yard run (Jake Bates kick), 14:58. Lions 14–0. **Drive: 3 plays, 14 yards, 0:53.**
- SEA – Kenneth Walker III 1-yard run (Jason Myers kick), 10:08. Lions 14–7. **Drive: 10 plays, 70 yards, 4:50.**
- DET – Jahmyr Gibbs 1-yard run (Jake Bates kick), 5:11. Lions 21–7. **Drive: 9 plays, 70 yards, 4:57.**

**Third quarter**

- SEA – AJ Barner 9-yard pass from Geno Smith (Jason Myers kick), 9:46. Lions 21–14. **Drive: 10 plays, 75 yards, 5:14.**
- DET – Jared Goff 7-yard pass from Amon-Ra St. Brown (Jake Bates kick), 6:57. Lions 28–14. **Drive: 5 plays, 70 yards, 2:49.**
- SEA – Kenneth Walker III 1-yard run (pass failed), 3:03. Lions 28–20. **Drive: 10 plays, 70 yards, 4:50.**
- DET – Jameson Williams 70-yard pass from Jared Goff (Jake Bates kick), 2:52. Lions 35–20. **Drive: 1 play, 70 yards, 0:11.**

**Fourth quarter**

- SEA – Kenneth Walker III 21-yard run (Jason Myers kick), 14:48. Lions 35–27. **Drive: 7 plays, 70 yards, 3:04.**
- DET – Amon-Ra St. Brown 8-yard pass from Jared Goff (Jake Bates kick), 5:23. Lions 42–27. **Drive: 7 plays, 80 yards, 3:34.**
- SEA – Jared Goff sacked by Dre'Mont Jones for a safety, 2:01. Lions 42–29.

**Top passers**

- SEA – Geno Smith – 38/56, 395 yards, TD
- DET – Jared Goff – 18/18, 292 yards, 2 TD

**Top rushers**

- SEA – Kenneth Walker III – 12 rushes, 80 yards, 3 TD
- DET – Jahmyr Gibbs – 14 rushes, 78 yards, 2 TD

**Top receivers**

- SEA – DK Metcalf – 7 receptions, 104 yards
- DET – Jameson Williams – 2 receptions, 80 yards, TD

In week 4, the Lions hosted the Seattle Seahawks. The Lions opened the scoring in the first quarter via a one-yard touchdown run from David Montgomery. The Lions scored 14 points in the second quarter via two rushing touchdowns by Jahmyr Gibbs from three-yards, and one-yard, respectively. The Seahawks responded with a one-yard touchdown run from Kenneth Walker III, which made the score 21–7 in favor of Detroit at half-time. The Seahawks scored 13 points in the third quarter via a nine-yard touchdown pass from Geno Smith to AJ Barner and a one-yard touchdown run from Walker III. The Lions scored 14 points in the quarter via a seven-yard touchdown pass from Amon-Ra St. Brown to Jared Goff, and a 70-yard touchdown pass from Goff to Jameson Williams. The teams exchanged touchdowns in the fourth quarter, first a 21-yard touchdown run from Walker III for the Seahawks, then an eight-yard touchdown pass from Goff to St. Brown for the Lions. The Seahawks scored the final points of the game after Goff was sacked in the endzone by Dre'Mont Jones for a safety, making the final score 42–29 in favor of Detroit. The win marked Lions' first victory against the Seahawks since 2012, snapping a six-game losing streak. Goff finished the game a perfect 18-for-18 for 292 yards and two touchdowns, becoming the first player in NFL history with a perfect completion percentage in a game with a minimum of 15 passes.

==== Week 6: at Dallas Cowboys ====
Week 6: Detroit Lions at Dallas Cowboys – Game summary

Quarter	1	2	3	4	Total
**Lions**	7	20	10	10	**47**
Cowboys	3	3	3	0	**9**

at AT&T Stadium, Arlington, Texas

- Date: October 13
- Game time: 4:25 p.m. EDT/3:25 p.m. CDT
- Game weather: None (retractable roof closed)
- Game attendance: 93,644
- Referee: John Hussey
- TV announcers (Fox): Kevin Burkhardt, Tom Brady, Erin Andrews and Tom Rinaldi
- Recap, Game Book

Game information

**First quarter**

- DAL – Brandon Aubrey 34-yard field goal, 11:21. Cowboys 3–0. **Drive: 9 plays, 54 yards, 3:39.**
- DET – David Montgomery 16-yard run (Jake Bates kick), 9:06. Lions 7–3. **Drive: 5 plays, 70 yards, 2:15.**

**Second quarter**

- DET – Jake Bates 40-yard field goal, 13:28. Lions 10–3. **Drive: 12 plays, 58 yards, 6:06.**
- DET – Sam LaPorta 52-yard pass from Jared Goff (Jake Bates kick), 11:39. Lions 17–3. **Drive: 3 plays, 63 yards, 0:51.**
- DET – Jake Bates 48-yard field goal, 13:57. Lions 20–3. **Drive: 11 plays, 39 yards, 6:20.**
- DET – David Montgomery 1-yard run (Jake Bates kick), 0:36. Lions 27–3. **Drive: 6 plays, 38 yards, 2:03.**
- DAL – Brandon Aubrey 34-yard field goal, 0:08. Lions 27–6. **Drive: 4 plays, 1 yard, 0:28.**

**Third quarter**

- DET – Jameson Williams 37-yard pass from Jared Goff (Jake Bates kick), 12:35. Lions 34–6. **Drive: 5 plays, 70 yards, 2:25.**
- DAL – Brandon Aubrey 50-yard field goal, 8:48. Lions 34–9. **Drive: 10 plays, 39 yards, 3:47.**
- DET – Jake Bates 33-yard field goal, 5:26. Lions 37–9. **Drive: 6 plays, 44 yards, 3:22.**

**Fourth quarter**

- DET – Jake Bates 33-yard field goal,14:12. Lions 40–9. **Drive: 9 plays, 57 yards, 5:12.**
- DET – Amon-Ra St. Brown 4-yard pass from Jared Goff (Jake Bates kick), 13:18. Lions 47–9. **Drive: 1 play, 4 yards, 0:04.**

**Top passers**

- DET – Jared Goff – 18/25, 315 yards, 3 TD
- DAL – Dak Prescott – 17/33, 178 yards, 2 INT

**Top rushers**

- DET – David Montgomery – 12 rushes, 80 yards, 2 TD
- DAL – Rico Dowdle – 5 rushes, 25 yards

**Top receivers**

- DET – Jameson Williams – 3 receptions, 76 yards, TD
- DAL – CeeDee Lamb – 7 receptions, 89 yards

Following their bye week, in week 6, the Lions visited the Dallas Cowboys. The Cowboys opened the scoring in the first quarter via a 34-yard field goal by Brandon Aubrey. The Lions responded with a 16-yard touchdown run from David Montgomery. The Lions scored 20 points in the second quarter via a 40-yard field goal by Jake Bates, a 40-yard touchdown pass from Jared Goff to Sam LaPorta, a 48-yard field goal by Bates and a one-yard touchdown run from Montgomery. The Cowboys scored the final points of the half via a 34-yard field goal by Aubrey, which made the score 27–6 in favor of Detroit at half-time. The Lions extended their lead in the third quarter via a 37-yard touchdown pass from Goff to Jameson Williams. The teams then exchanged field goals, first a 50-yard field goal by Aubrey for the Cowboys, then a 33-yard field goal by Bates for the Lions. The Lions scored ten points in the fourth quarter via a 33-yard field goal by Bates and a four-yard touchdown pass from Goff to Amon-Ra St. Brown, making the final score 47–9 in favor of Detroit. This was the Lions' first win over the Cowboys since 2013, snapping a six-game losing streak; however, the victory was marred when Aidan Hutchinson suffered a broken tibia and fibula in the third quarter. Originally thought to be season-ending, Lions head coach Dan Campbell said that Hutchinson would need "4 to 6 months" to recover.

==== Week 7: at Minnesota Vikings ====
Week 7: Detroit Lions at Minnesota Vikings – Game summary

Quarter	1	2	3	4	Total
**Lions**	0	21	7	3	**31**
Vikings	10	0	7	12	**29**

at U.S. Bank Stadium, Minneapolis, Minnesota

- Date: October 20
- Game time: 1:00 p.m. EDT/12:00 p.m. CDT
- Game weather: None (indoor stadium)
- Game attendance: 66,971
- Referee: Clay Martin
- TV announcers (Fox): Adam Amin, Greg Olsen and Pam Oliver
- Recap, Game Book

Game information

**First quarter**

- MIN – Aaron Jones 34-yard run (Will Reichard kick), 11:43. Vikings 7–0. **Drive: 2 plays, 34 yards, 0:48.**
- MIN – Will Reichard 57-yard field goal, 5:34. Vikings 10–0. **Drive: 9 plays, 41 yards, 4:36.**

**Second quarter**

- DET – Jahmyr Gibbs 45-yard run (Jake Bates kick), 13:42. Vikings 10–7. **Drive: 5 plays, 69 yards, 2:09.**
- DET – Amon-Ra St. Brown 35-yard pass from Jared Goff (Jake Bates kick), 8:39. Lions 14–10. **Drive: 5 plays, 83 yards, 2:45.**
- DET – Jahmyr Gibbs 8-yard run (Jake Bates kick), 0:26. Lions 21–10. **Drive: 9 plays, 72 yards, 5:13.**

**Third quarter**

- MIN – Justin Jefferson 25-yard pass from Sam Darnold (Will Reichard kick), 10:42. Lions 21–17. **Drive: 9 plays, 80 yards, 4:18.**
- DET – Kalif Raymond 21-yard pass from Jared Goff (Jake Bates kick), 5:43. Lions 28–17. **Drive: 9 plays, 70 yards, 4:59.**

**Fourth quarter**

- MIN – Will Reichard 42-yard field goal, 14:24. Lions 28–20. **Drive: 9 plays, 46 yards, 6:19.**
- MIN – Will Reichard 48-yard field goal, 6:04. Lions 28–23. **Drive: 7 plays, 61 yards, 4:06.**
- MIN – Ivan Pace Jr. 36-yard fumble return (pass failed), 5:50. Vikings 29–28.
- DET – Jake Bates 44-yard field goal, 0:15. Lions 31–29. **Drive: 8 plays, 44 yards, 2:17.**

**Top passers**

- DET – Jared Goff – 22/25, 280 yards, 2 TD
- MIN – Sam Darnold – 22/27, 259 yards, TD, INT

**Top rushers**

- DET – Jahmyr Gibbs – 15 rushes, 116 yards, 2 TD
- MIN – Aaron Jones – 14 rushes, 93 yards, TD

**Top receivers**

- DET – Amon-Ra St. Brown – 8 receptions, 112 yards, TD
- MIN – Justin Jefferson – 7 receptions, 81 yards, TD

In week 7, the Lions visited their divisional rival, the Minnesota Vikings. The Vikings scored ten points in the first quarter via a 34-yard touchdown run from Aaron Jones and a 57-yard field goal by Will Reichard. The Lions scored 21 points in the second quarter via a 45-yard touchdown run from Jahmyr Gibbs, a 35-yard touchdown pass from Jared Goff to Amon-Ra St. Brown, and an eight-yard touchdown run from Gibbs, which made the score 21–10 in favor of Detroit at half-time. The teams exchanged touchdowns in the third quarter, first a 25-yard touchdown pass from Sam Darnold to Justin Jefferson for the Vikings, then a 21-yard touchdown pass from Goff to Kalif Raymond for the Lions. The Vikings scored 12 points in the fourth quarter via two field goals by Reichard, from 42-yards, and 48-yards, respectively, and a 36-yard fumble return by Ivan Pace Jr., to regain the lead. The Vikings, however, failed a two-point conversion following their defensive touchdown, which gave the Lions an opportunity to retake the lead with field goal, and did so a 44-yarder by Jake Bates with 15 seconds remaining in the game, making the final score 31–29 in favor of Detroit. With the win, their fourth straight over the Vikings, the Lions moved into first place in the division.

==== Week 8: vs. Tennessee Titans ====
Week 8: Tennessee Titans at Detroit Lions – Game summary

Quarter	1	2	3	4	Total
Titans	7	7	0	0	**14**
**Lions**	14	21	17	0	**52**

at Ford Field, Detroit, Michigan

- Date: October 27
- Game time: 1:00 p.m. EDT
- Game weather: None (indoor stadium)
- Game attendance: 64,316
- Referee: Carl Cheffers
- TV announcers (Fox): Kevin Kugler, Daryl Johnston and Laura Okmin
- Recap, Game Book

Game information

**First quarter**

- DET – David Montgomery 7-yard run (Jake Bates kick), 10:31. Lions 7–0. **Drive: 2 plays, 23 yards, 0:28.**
- TEN – Mason Rudolph 11-yard run (Nick Folk kick), 4:07. Tied 7–7. **Drive: 4 plays, 75 yards, 2:13.**
- DET – Jahmyr Gibbs 70-yard run (Jake Bates kick), 3:57. Lions 14–7. **Drive: 1 play, 70 yards, 0:10.**

**Second quarter**

- TEN – Nick Westbrook-Ikhine 5-yard pass from Mason Rudolph (Nick Folk kick), 14:18. Tied 14–14. **Drive: 7 plays, 70 yards, 4:39.**
- DET – Brock Wright 8-yard pass from Jared Goff (Jake Bates kick), 12:51. Lions 21–14. **Drive: 3 plays, 25 yards, 1:27.**
- DET – Amon-Ra St. Brown 1-yard pass from Jared Goff (Jake Bates kick), 11:37. Lions 28–14. **Drive: 4 plays, 12 yards, 1:02.**
- DET – Sam LaPorta 3-yard pass from David Montgomery (Jake Bates kick), 2:18. Lions 35–14. **Drive: 7 plays, 22 yards, 3:59.**

**Third quarter**

- DET – Kalif Raymond 90-yard punt return (Jake Bates kick), 12:46. Lions 42–14. **Drive: 3 plays, 9 yards, 2:14.**
- DET – Kalif Raymond 7-yard pass from Jared Goff (Jake Bates kick), 6:12. Lions 49–14. **Drive: 3 plays, 26 yards, 1:25.**
- DET – Jake Bates 51-yard field goal, 1:08. Lions 52–14. **Drive: 8 plays, 48 yards, 4:00.**

**Fourth quarter**

- No scoring plays.

**Top passers**

- TEN – Mason Rudolph – 22/38, 266 yards, TD, 2 INT
- DET – Jared Goff – 12/15, 85 yards, 3 TD

**Top rushers**

- TEN – Tony Pollard – 20 rushes, 94 yards
- DET – Jahmyr Gibbs – 11 rushes, 127 yards, TD

**Top receivers**

- TEN – Calvin Ridley – 10 receptions, 143 yards
- DET – Sam LaPorta – 6 receptions, 48 yards, TD

In week 8, the Lions hosted the Tennessee Titans. The Lions opened the scoring in the first quarter via a seven-yard touchdown run from David Montgomery. The Titans responded with an 11-yard touchdown run from Mason Rudolph to tie the game. The Lions responded with a 70-yard touchdown run from Jahmyr Gibbs to regain the lead. The Titans tied the game in second quarter via a five-yard touchdown pass from Rudolph to Nick Westbrook-Ikhine. The Lions scored 21 points in the quarter via an eight-yard touchdown pass from Jared Goff to Brock Wright, a one-yard touchdown pass from Goff to Amon-Ra St. Brown, and a three-yard touchdown pass from Montgomery to Sam LaPorta, which made the score 35–14 in favor of Detroit at half-time. The Lions scored 17 points in the third quarter via a 90-yard punt return by Kalif Raymond, a seven-yard touchdown pass from Goff to Raymond, and a 51-yard field goal by Jake Bates. After a scoreless fourth quarter, the Lions won the game by a final score 52–14 in favor of Detroit. With the win, the Lions improved to 6–1 to start the season for the first time since 1956. This was also their first win over the Titans franchise since 1995, when the team was known as the Houston Oilers.

==== Week 9: at Green Bay Packers ====
Week 9: Detroit Lions at Green Bay Packers – Game summary

Quarter	1	2	3	4	Total
**Lions**	0	17	7	0	**24**
Packers	3	0	3	8	**14**

at Lambeau Field, Green Bay, Wisconsin

- Date: November 3
- Game time: 4:25 p.m. EST/3:25 p.m. CST
- Game weather: Rain, 50 °F (10 °C)
- Game attendance: 78,330
- Referee: Clete Blakeman
- TV announcers (Fox): Kevin Burkhardt, Tom Brady, Erin Andrews and Tom Rinaldi
- Recap, Game Book

Game information

**First quarter**

- GB – Brandon McManus 30-yard field goal, 7:06. Packers 3–0. **Drive: 14 plays, 63 yards, 7:54.**

**Second quarter**

- DET – Amon-Ra St. Brown 3-yard pass from Jared Goff (Jake Bates kick), 14:56. Lions 7–3. **Drive: 13 plays, 70 yards, 7:10.**
- DET – Jake Bates 27-yard field goal, 0:58. Lions 10–3. **Drive: 10 plays, 55 yards, 4:25.**
- DET – Kerby Joseph 27-yard interception return (Jake Bates kick), 0:32. Lions 17–3. **Drive: 2 plays, 8 yards, 0:26.**

**Third quarter**

- DET – Jahmyr Gibbs 15-yard run (Jake Bates kick), 9:32. Lions 24–3. **Drive: 9 plays, 71 yards, 5:28.**
- GB – Brandon McManus 38-yard field goal, 0:48. Lions 24–6. **Drive: 10 plays, 55 yards, 5:09.**

**Fourth quarter**

- GB – Emanuel Wilson 2-yard run (Jordan Love–Christian Watson pass), 3:49. Lions 24–14. **Drive: 8 plays, 55 yards, 2:33.**

**Top passers**

- DET – Jared Goff – 18/22, 145 yards, TD
- GB – Jordan Love – 23/39, 273 yards, INT

**Top rushers**

- DET – David Montgomery – 17 rushes, 73 yards
- GB – Josh Jacobs – 13 rushes, 95 yards

**Top receivers**

- DET – Amon-Ra St. Brown – 7 receptions, 56 yards, TD
- GB – Jayden Reed – 5 receptions, 113 yards

In week 9, the Lions visited their divisional rival, the Green Bay Packers. The Packers opened the scoring in the first quarter via a 30-yard field goal by Brandon McManus. The Lions scored 17 points in the second quarter via a three-yard touchdown pass from Jared Goff to Amon-Ra St. Brown, a 27-yard field goal by Jake Bates, and a 27-yard interception return by Kerby Joseph, which made the score 17–3 in favor of Detroit at half-time. The Lions extended their lead in the third quarter via a 15-yard touchdown run from Jahmyr Gibbs. The Packers responded with a 38-yard field goal by McManus. The Packers scored the only points of the fourth quarter via a two-yard touchdown run from Emanuel Wilson, and a two-point conversion pass from Jordan Love to Christian Watson, making the final score 24–14 in favor of Detroit. This also marked the first time the Lions won three consecutive games in Green Bay since 1986-1988.

==== Week 10: at Houston Texans ====
Week 10: Detroit Lions at Houston Texans – Game summary

Quarter	1	2	3	4	Total
**Lions**	0	7	6	13	**26**
Texans	10	13	0	0	**23**

at NRG Stadium, Houston, Texas

- Date: November 10
- Game time: 8:20 p.m. EST/7:20 p.m. CST
- Game weather: Clear, 73 °F (23 °C) (retractable roof open)
- Game attendance: 71,512
- Referee: Bill Vinovich
- TV announcers (NBC): Mike Tirico, Cris Collinsworth and Melissa Stark
- Recap, Game Book

Game information

**First quarter**

- HOU – Joe Mixon 8-yard run (Kaʻimi Fairbairn kick), 7:46. Texans 7–0. **Drive: 8 plays, 33 yards, 5:09.**
- HOU – Kaʻimi Fairbairn 34-yard field goal, 2:09. Texans 10–0. **Drive: 8 plays, 41 yards, 4:13.**

**Second quarter**

- DET – Sam LaPorta 20-yard pass from Jared Goff (Jake Bates kick), 10:52. Texans 10–7. **Drive: 11 plays, 70 yards, 6:17.**
- HOU – Kaʻimi Fairbairn 56-yard field goal, 8:25. Texans 13–7. **Drive: 5 plays, 32 yards, 2:27.**
- HOU – Kaʻimi Fairbairn 29-yard field goal, 4:07. Texans 16–7. **Drive: 8 plays, 25 yards, 3:27.**
- HOU – John Metchie III 15-yard pass from C. J. Stroud (Kaʻimi Fairbairn kick), 0:12. Texans 23–7. **Drive: 6 plays, 66 yards, 0:42.**

**Third quarter**

- DET – David Montgomery 3-yard run (run failed), 11:34. Texans 23–13. **Drive: 3 plays, 44 yards, 1:10.**

**Fourth quarter**

- DET – Amon-Ra St. Brown 9-yard pass from Jared Goff (Jake Bates kick), 11:38. Texans 23–20. **Drive: 7 plays, 64 yards, 3:11.**
- DET – Jake Bates 58-yard field goal, 5:01. Tied 23–23. **Drive: 7 plays, 43 yards, 3:20.**
- DET – Jake Bates 52-yard field goal, 0:00. Lions 26–23. **Drive: 6 plays, 18 yards, 1:51.**

**Top passers**

- DET – Jared Goff – 15/30, 240 yards, 2 TD, 5 INT
- HOU – C. J. Stroud – 19/33, 232 yards, TD, 2 INT

**Top rushers**

- DET – Jahmyr Gibbs – 19 rushes, 71 yards
- HOU – Joe Mixon – 25 rushes, 46 yards, TD

**Top receivers**

- DET – Sam LaPorta – 3 receptions, 66 yards, TD
- HOU – John Metchie III – 5 receptions, 74 yards, TD

In week 10, the Lions visited the Houston Texans. The Texans scored ten points in the first quarter via an eight-yard touchdown run from Joe Mixon and a 34-yard field goal by Kaʻimi Fairbairn. The Lions got on the board in the second quarter via a 20-yard touchdown pass from Jared Goff to Sam LaPorta. The Texans responded with 13 points in the quarter via two field goals by Fairbairn, from 56-yards, and 29-yards, respectively, and a 15-yard touchdown pass from C. J. Stroud to John Metchie III, which made the score 23–7 in favor of Houston at half-time. The Texans were held scoreless in the second-half, as the Lions scored 19 unanswered points. The Lions scored six points in the third quarter via a three-yard touchdown run from David Montgomery. The Lions scored 13 points in the fourth quarter via a nine-yard touchdown pass from Goff to Amon-Ra St. Brown, and two field goals by Jake Bates, from 58-yards, and 52-yards respectively. Bates scored the game-winning field goal as time expired, making the final score 26–23 in favor of Detroit. Jared Goff threw a career-high five interceptions during the game. The Lions became the first team to win when throwing five or more interceptions in a game since Matt Ryan of the Atlanta Falcons defeated the Arizona Cardinals on November 18, 2012. The Lions also became the first team since the 1970 Baltimore Colts to win after overcoming a deficit of at least 15 points while throwing five or more interceptions.

==== Week 11: vs. Jacksonville Jaguars ====
Week 11: Jacksonville Jaguars at Detroit Lions – Game summary

Quarter	1	2	3	4	Total
Jaguars	3	3	0	0	**6**
**Lions**	7	21	14	10	**52**

at Ford Field, Detroit, Michigan

- Date: November 17
- Game time: 1:00 p.m. EST
- Game weather: None (indoor stadium)
- Game attendance: 64,273
- Referee: Scott Novak
- TV announcers (CBS): Kevin Harlan, Trent Green and Melanie Collins
- Recap, Game Book

Game information

**First quarter**

- JAX – Cam Little 59-yard field goal, 9:34. Jaguars 3–0. **Drive: 9 plays, 29 yards, 5:24.**
- DET – David Montgomery 2-yard run (Jake Bates kick), 4:59. Lions 7–3. **Drive: 9 plays, 70 yards, 4:37.**

**Second quarter**

- DET – Jahmyr Gibbs 1-yard run (Jake Bates kick), 12:26. Lions 14–3. **Drive: 13 plays, 93 yards, 5:27.**
- DET – David Montgomery 6-yard run (Jake Bates kick), 6:39. Lions 21–3. **Drive: 8 plays, 64 yards, 4:12.**
- DET – Amon-Ra St. Brown 27-yard pass from Jared Goff (Jake Bates kick), 2:46. Lions 28–3. **Drive: 4 plays, 84 yards, 2:12.**
- JAX – Cam Little 35-yard field goal, 0:00. Lions 28–6. **Drive: 11 plays, 53 yards, 2:46.**

**Third quarter**

- DET – Jameson Williams 64-yard pass from Jared Goff (Jake Bates kick), 12:55. Lions 35–6. **Drive: 4 plays, 80 yards, 2:05.**
- DET – Brock Wright 5-yard pass from Jared Goff (Jake Bates kick), 4:16. Lions 42–6. **Drive: 14 plays, 83 yards, 7:49.**

**Fourth quarter**

- DET – Amon-Ra St. Brown 9-yard pass from Jared Goff (Jake Bates kick), 13:23. Lions 49–6. **Drive: 9 plays, 96 yards, 3:55.**
- DET – Jake Bates 54-yard field goal, 7:49. Lions 52–6. **Drive: 5 plays, 23 yards, 2:04.**

**Top passers**

- JAX – Mac Jones – 17/29, 138 yards, INT
- DET – Jared Goff – 24/29, 412 yards, 4 TD

**Top rushers**

- JAX – Travis Etienne – 12 rushes, 27 yards
- DET – David Montgomery – 15 rushes, 75 yards, 2 TD

**Top receivers**

- JAX – Brian Thomas Jr. – 5 receptions, 82 yards
- DET – Amon-Ra St. Brown – 11 receptions, 161 yards, 2 TD

In week 11, the Lions hosted the Jacksonville Jaguars. The Jaguars opened the scoring in the first quarter via a 59-yard field goal by Cam Little. The Lions responded with a two-yard touchdown run from David Montgomery to take the lead. The Lions added to their lead in the second quarter with 21 points via a one-yard touchdown run from Jahmyr Gibbs, a six-yard touchdown run from Montgomery and a 27-yard touchdown pass from Jared Goff to Amon-Ra St. Brown. The Jaguars scored the final points of the half via a 35-yard field goal by Little, which made the score 28–6 in favor of Detroit at half-time. The Lions scored 14 points in the third quarter via a 64-yard touchdown pass from Goff to Jameson Williams and a five-yard touchdown pass from Goff to Brock Wright. The Lions scored ten points in the fourth quarter via a nine-yard touchdown pass from Goff to St. Brown and a 54-yard field goal by Jake Bates, making the final score 52–6 in favor of Detroit.

With the win, the Lions improved to 9–1 to start the season, their best ten-game start to a season since starting 10–0 in 1934. This was their eighth consecutive win, setting a franchise record for the most consecutive wins in a single season in the Super Bowl era, and their most since winning ten in a row in 1934. The Lions scored touchdowns on their first seven possessions of the game, the first NFL team to accomplish this feat since the 2007 New England Patriots. The Lions also set a franchise record with 645 total yards of offense and set another franchise record in margin of victory with the 46 point margin.

==== Week 12: at Indianapolis Colts ====
Week 12: Detroit Lions at Indianapolis Colts – Game summary

Quarter	1	2	3	4	Total
**Lions**	0	7	14	3	**24**
Colts	3	3	0	0	**6**

at Lucas Oil Stadium, Indianapolis, Indiana

- Date: November 24
- Game time: 1:00 p.m. EST
- Game weather: None (retractable roof closed)
- Game attendance: 66,696
- Referee: Shawn Hochuli
- TV announcers (Fox): Kenny Albert, Jonathan Vilma and Megan Olivi
- Recap, Game Book

Game information

**First quarter**

- IND – Matt Gay 27-yard field goal, 8:53. Colts 3–0. **Drive: 11 plays, 61 yards, 6:07.**

**Second quarter**

- DET – Jahmyr Gibbs 1-yard run (Jake Bates kick), 12:07. Lions 7–3. **Drive: 9 plays, 60 yards, 4:12.**
- IND – Matt Gay 29-yard field goal, 8:16. Lions 7–6. **Drive: 9 plays, 65 yards, 3:51.**
- DET – David Montgomery 6-yard run (Jake Bates kick), 3:34. Lions 14–6. **Drive: 9 plays, 70 yards, 4:42.**

**Third quarter**

- DET – Jahmyr Gibbs 5-yard run (Jake Bates kick), 2:19. Lions 21–6. **Drive: 10 plays, 79 yards, 5:22.**

**Fourth quarter**

- DET – Jake Bates 56-yard field goal, 6:21. Lions 24–6. **Drive: 7 plays, 16 yards, 3:47.**

**Top passers**

- DET – Jared Goff – 26/36, 269 yards
- IND – Anthony Richardson – 11/28, 172 yards

**Top rushers**

- DET – Jahmyr Gibbs – 21 rushes, 90 yards, 2 TD
- IND – Anthony Richardson – 10 rushes, 61 yards

**Top receivers**

- DET – Jameson Williams – 5 receptions, 64 yards
- IND – Michael Pittman Jr. – 6 receptions, 96 yards

In week 12, the Lions visited the Indianapolis Colts. The Colts opened the scoring in the first quarter via a 27-yard field goal by Matt Gay. The Lions scored 14 points in the second quarter via a one-yard touchdown run from Jahmyr Gibbs and a six-yard touchdown run from David Montgomery. The Colts scored via a 29-yard field goal by Gay, which made the score 14–6 in favor of Detroit at half-time. The Colts were held scoreless in the second-half. The Lions extended their lead in the third quarter via a five-yard touchdown run from Gibbs. The Lions scored the game's final points in the fourth quarter via a 56-yard field goal by Jake Bates, making the final score 24–6 in favor of Detroit. With this win, the Lions managed to sweep the entire AFC South.

==== Week 13: vs. Chicago Bears ====
Thanksgiving Day games

Week 13: Chicago Bears at Detroit Lions – Game summary

Quarter	1	2	3	4	Total
Bears	0	0	7	13	**20**
**Lions**	3	13	7	0	**23**

at Ford Field, Detroit, Michigan

- Date: November 28
- Game time: 12:30 p.m. EST
- Game weather: None (indoor stadium)
- Game attendance: 64,275
- Referee: Alan Eck
- TV announcers (CBS): Jim Nantz, Tony Romo and Tracy Wolfson
- Recap, Game Book

Game information

**First quarter**

- DET – Jake Bates 30-yard field goal, 7:06. Lions 3–0. **Drive: 15 plays, 58 yards, 7:54.**

**Second quarter**

- DET – Sam LaPorta 3-yard pass from Jared Goff (Jake Bates kick), 14:55. Lions 10–0. **Drive: 10 plays, 90 yards, 5:33.**
- DET – Jake Bates 36-yard field goal, 7:15. Lions 13–0. **Drive: 11 plays, 56 yards, 5:26.**
- DET – Jake Bates 48-yard field goal, 3:11. Lions 16–0. **Drive: 9 plays, 39 yards, 3:02.**

**Third quarter**

- CHI – Keenan Allen 31-yard pass from Caleb Williams (Cairo Santos kick), 9:47. Lions 16–7. **Drive: 9 plays, 74 yards, 5:13.**
- DET – Sam LaPorta 1-yard pass from Jared Goff (Jake Bates kick), 2:43. Lions 23–7. **Drive: 11 plays, 78 yards, 7:04.**

**Fourth quarter**

- CHI – Keenan Allen 9-yard pass from Caleb Williams (pass failed), 13:40. Lions 23–13. **Drive: 8 plays, 70 yards, 4:03.**
- CHI – D. J. Moore 31-yard pass from Caleb Williams (Cairo Santos kick), 5:36. Lions 23–20. **Drive: 8 plays, 65 yards, 3:06.**

**Top passers**

- CHI – Caleb Williams – 20/38, 256 yards, 3 TD
- DET – Jared Goff – 21/34, 221 yards, 2 TD

**Top rushers**

- CHI – D'Andre Swift – 11 rushes, 39 yards
- DET – David Montgomery – 21 rushes, 88 yards

**Top receivers**

- CHI – D. J. Moore – 8 receptions, 97 yards, TD
- DET – Amon-Ra St. Brown – 5 receptions, 73 yards

For their annual Thanksgiving Day game, the Lions hosted their divisional rival, the Chicago Bears. The Lions opened the scoring in the first quarter via a 30-yard field goal by Jake Bates. The Lions scored 13 points in the second quarter via a three-yard touchdown pass from Jared Goff to Sam LaPorta and two field goals by Bates from 36-yards, and 48-yards, respectively, which made the score 16–0 in favor of Detroit at half-time. The Bears got on the board in the third quarter via a 31-yard touchdown pass from Caleb Williams to Keenan Allen. The Lions responded with a one-yard touchdown pass from Goff to LaPorta. The Bears scored 13 points in the fourth quarter via a nine-yard touchdown pass from Williams to Allen and a 31-yard touchdown pass from Williams to D. J. Moore, cutting the Lions’ lead to three points. On their final drive, the Bears had a chance to tie the game; however, with approximately 30 seconds remaining, Williams was sacked which knocked the Bears out of field goal range. On the final play of the game, Bears head coach Matt Eberflus declined to use his team's final timeout. With the clock running out, Williams threw a desperation pass towards the end zone to Rome Odunze, which was incomplete, allowing the Lions to hold on for a 23–20 win. This marked their first Thanksgiving Day victory since 2016.

The victory came with significant defensive personnel losses, as defensive linemen Levi Onwuzurike (hamstring) and Josh Paschal (knee) exited the game, and linebacker Malcolm Rodriguez suffered a season-ending ACL tear. These injuries added to Detroit's existing defensive challenges, with several key players already on injured reserve, including Pro Bowler edge rusher Aidan Hutchinson and linebacker Alex Anzalone.

==== Week 14: vs. Green Bay Packers ====
Week 14: Green Bay Packers at Detroit Lions – Game summary

Quarter	1	2	3	4	Total
Packers	0	7	14	10	**31**
**Lions**	7	10	7	10	**34**

at Ford Field, Detroit, Michigan

- Date: December 5
- Game time: 8:15 p.m. EST
- Game weather: None (indoor stadium)
- Game attendance: 63,987
- Referee: John Hussey
- TV announcers (WJBK, CHWI, WITI, WGBA): Al Michaels, Kirk Herbstreit and Kaylee Hartung
  Game exclusive to WJBK (Detroit), CHWI (Windsor), WITI (Milwaukee), and WGBA (Green Bay). Available on Prime Video out of market.
- Recap, Game Book

Game information

**First quarter**

- DET – David Montgomery 3-yard run (Jake Bates kick), 9:41. Lions 7–0. **Drive: 11 plays, 70 yards, 5:19.**

**Second quarter**

- DET – Jake Bates 43-yard field goal, 13:01. Lions 10–0. **Drive: 6 plays, 29 yards, 1:49.**
- GB – Josh Jacobs 1-yard run (Brandon McManus kick), 5:35. Lions 10–7. **Drive: 11 plays, 70 yards, 7:26.**
- DET – Jahmyr Gibbs 2-yard pass from Jared Goff (Jake Bates kick), 0:11. Lions 17–7. **Drive: 12 plays, 70 yards, 5:24.**

**Third quarter**

- GB – Tucker Kraft 12-yard pass from Jordan Love (Brandon McManus kick), 13:15. Lions 17–14. **Drive: 5 plays, 70 yards, 1:45.**
- GB – Josh Jacobs 6-yard run (Brandon McManus kick), 11:15. Packers 21–17. **Drive: 3 plays, 16 yards, 1:06.**
- DET – Tim Patrick 3-yard pass from Jared Goff (Jake Bates kick), 5:02. Lions 24–21. **Drive: 13 plays, 70 yards, 6:13.**

**Fourth quarter**

- GB – Josh Jacobs 4-yard run (Brandon McManus kick), 14:20. Packers 28–24. **Drive: 4 plays, 30 yards, 2:06.**
- DET – Tim Patrick 1-yard pass from Jared Goff (Jake Bates kick), 8:39. Lions 31–28. **Drive: 10 plays, 70 yards, 5:41.**
- GB – Brandon McManus 32-yard field goal, 3:38. Tied 31–31. **Drive: 9 plays, 56 yards, 5:01.**
- DET – Jake Bates 35-yard field goal, 0:00. Lions 34–31. **Drive: 11 plays, 53 yards, 3:38.**

**Top passers**

- GB – Jordan Love – 12/20, 206 yards, TD
- DET – Jared Goff – 32/41, 283 yards, 3 TD, INT

**Top rushers**

- GB – Josh Jacobs – 18 rushes, 66 yards, 3 TD
- DET – David Montgomery – 14 rushes, 51 yards, TD

**Top receivers**

- GB – Christian Watson – 4 receptions, 114 yards
- DET – Jameson Williams – 5 receptions, 80 yards

In week 14, the Lions hosted their divisional rival, the Green Bay Packers. The Lions opened the scoring in the first quarter via a three-yard touchdown run from David Montgomery. The Lions extended their lead in the second quarter via a 43-yard field goal by Jake Bates. The Packers finally got on the board via a one-yard touchdown run from Josh Jacobs. The Lions scored the final points of the half via a two-yard touchdown pass from Jared Goff to Jahmyr Gibbs, which made the score 17–7 in favor of Detroit at half-time. The Packers scored 14 points in the third quarter via a 12-yard touchdown pass from Jordan Love to Tucker Kraft and a six-yard touchdown run from Jacobs, giving the Packers their first lead of the game. The Lions responded with a three-yard touchdown pass from Goff to Tim Patrick to regain the lead. The teams exchanged touchdowns in the fourth quarter, first a four-yard touchdown run from Jacobs for the Packers, then a one-yard touchdown pass from Goff to Patrick for the Lions. The Packers tied the game via a 32-yard field goal by Brandon McManus. The Lions scored the final points of the game via a 35-yard field goal by Bates as time expired, making the final score 34–31 in favor of Detroit. With their win, the Lions clinched a playoff berth for the second consecutive season. This marks the first time the Lions have made the playoffs in consecutive seasons since 1995.

==== Week 15: vs. Buffalo Bills ====
Week 15: Buffalo Bills at Detroit Lions – Game summary

Quarter	1	2	3	4	Total
**Bills**	14	7	14	13	**48**
Lions	0	14	7	21	**42**

at Ford Field, Detroit, Michigan

- Date: December 15
- Game time: 4:25 p.m. EST
- Game weather: None (indoor stadium)
- Game attendance: 65,327
- Referee: Adrian Hill
- TV announcers (CBS): Jim Nantz, Tony Romo and Tracy Wolfson
- Recap, Game Book

Game information

**First quarter**

- BUF – Josh Allen 1-yard run (Tyler Bass kick), 10:56. Bills 7–0. **Drive: 7 plays, 73 yards, 3:06.**
- BUF – Josh Allen 4-yard run (Tyler Bass kick), 2:01. Bills 14–0. **Drive: 9 plays, 78 yards, 5:43.**

**Second quarter**

- DET – Tim Patrick 12-yard pass from Jared Goff (Jake Bates kick), 13:36. Bills 14–7. **Drive: 9 plays, 70 yards, 3:25.**
- BUF – James Cook 6-yard run (Tyler Bass kick), 8:15. Bills 21–7. **Drive: 9 plays, 70 yards, 5:21.**
- DET – Dan Skipper 9-yard pass from Jared Goff (Jake Bates kick), 3:01. Bills 21–14. **Drive: 10 plays, 70 yards, 5:14.**

**Third quarter**

- BUF – James Cook 41-yard run (Tyler Bass kick), 13:11. Bills 28–14. **Drive: 4 plays, 70 yards, 1:49.**
- BUF – Khalil Shakir 3-yard pass from Josh Allen (Tyler Bass kick), 3:31. Bills 35–14. **Drive: 5 plays, 26 yards, 1:37.**
- DET – Amon-Ra St. Brown 66-yard pass from Jared Goff (Jake Bates kick), 1:41. Bills 35–21. **Drive: 5 plays, 70 yards, 1:50.**

**Fourth quarter**

- BUF – Tyler Bass 50-yard field goal, 14:02. Bills 38–21. **Drive: 7 plays, 38 yards, 2:39.**
- DET – Jahmyr Gibbs 12-yard pass from Jared Goff (Jake Bates kick), 12:00. Bills 38–28. **Drive: 5 plays, 70 yards, 2:02.**
- BUF – Ray Davis 5-yard pass from Josh Allen (Tyler Bass kick), 11:51. Bills 45–28. **Drive: 1 play, 5 yards, 0:09.**
- DET – Jahmyr Gibbs 1-yard run (Jake Bates kick), 8:02. Bills 45–35. **Drive: 11 plays, 70 yards, 3:49.**
- BUF – Tyler Bass 41-yard field goal, 2:03. Bills 48–35. **Drive: 10 plays, 47 yards, 5:59.**
- DET – Jameson Williams 3-yard pass from Jared Goff (Jake Bates kick), 0:12. Bills 48–42. **Drive: 16 plays, 70 yards, 1:51.**

**Top passers**

- BUF – Josh Allen – 23/34, 362 yards, 2 TD
- DET – Jared Goff – 38/59, 494 yards, 5 TD

**Top rushers**

- BUF – James Cook – 14 rushes, 105 yards, 2 TD
- DET – Jahmyr Gibbs – 8 rushes, 31 yards, TD

**Top receivers**

- BUF – Ty Johnson – 5 receptions, 114 yards
- DET – Amon-Ra St. Brown – 14 receptions, 193 yards, TD

In week 15, the Lions hosted the Buffalo Bills. The Bills scored 14 points in the first quarter via two rushing touchdowns by Josh Allen, from one-yard, and four-yards, respectively. The Lions got on the board in the second quarter via a 12-yard touchdown pass from Jared Goff to Tim Patrick. The Bills responded with a six-yard touchdown run from James Cook. The Lions scored the final points of the half via a nine-yard touchdown pass from Goff to Dan Skipper, which made the score 21–14 in favor of Buffalo at half-time. The Bills scored 14 points in the third quarter via a 41-yard touchdown run from Cook and a three-yard touchdown pass from Allen to Khalil Shakir. The Lions responded with a 66-yard touchdown pass from Goff to Amon-Ra St. Brown. The Bills scored 13 points in the fourth quarter via a five-yard touchdown pass from Allen to Ray Davis, and two field goals by Bass, from 50-yards, and 41-yards, respectively. The Lions scored 21 points in the quarter via a 12-yard touchdown pass from Goff to Jahmyr Gibbs, a one-yard touchdown run from Gibbs, and a three-yard touchdown pass from Goff to Jameson Williams, making the final score 48–42 in favor of Buffalo. The loss snapped a franchise-record 11 game winning streak for the Lions.

==== Week 16: at Chicago Bears ====
Week 16: Detroit Lions at Chicago Bears – Game summary

Quarter	1	2	3	4	Total
**Lions**	13	14	7	0	**34**
Bears	0	14	3	0	**17**

at Soldier Field, Chicago, Illinois

- Date: December 22
- Game time: 1:00 p.m. EST/12:00 p.m. CST
- Game weather: Mostly cloudy, 29 °F (−2 °C)
- Game attendance: 56,539
- Referee: Clete Blakeman
- TV announcers (Fox): Kenny Albert, Jonathan Vilma and Megan Olivi
- Recap, Game Book

Game information

**First quarter**

- DET – Jake Bates 30-yard field goal, 9:35. Lions 3–0. **Drive: 9 plays, 55 yards, 4:14.**
- DET – Jahmyr Gibbs 1-yard run (Jake Bates kick), 5:34. Lions 10–0. **Drive: 7 plays, 36 yards, 2:53.**
- DET – Jake Bates 34-yard field goal, 0:02. Lions 13–0. **Drive: 7 plays, 44 yards, 3:26.**

**Second quarter**

- DET – Jameson Williams 82-yard pass from Jared Goff (Jake Bates kick), 12:49. Lions 20–0. **Drive: 2 plays, 93 yards, 0:43.**
- CHI – Cole Kmet 1-yard pass from Caleb Williams (Cairo Santos kick), 6:31. Lions 20–7. **Drive: 14 plays, 70 yards, 6:16.**
- DET – Amon-Ra St. Brown 8-yard pass from Jared Goff (Jake Bates kick), 0:58. Lions 27–7. **Drive: 11 plays, 70 yards, 5:33.**
- CHI – Keenan Allen 45-yard pass from Caleb Williams (Cairo Santos kick), 0:39. Lions 27–14. **Drive: 3 plays, 70 yards, 0:19.**

**Third quarter**

- DET – Sam LaPorta 21-yard pass from Jared Goff (Jake Bates kick), 12:18. Lions 34–14. **Drive: 5 plays, 79 yards, 2:42.**
- CHI – Cairo Santos 30-yard field goal, 6:03. Lions 34–17. **Drive: 10 plays, 58 yards, 6:15.**

**Fourth quarter**

- No scoring plays.

**Top passers**

- DET – Jared Goff – 23/32, 336 yards, 3 TD
- CHI – Caleb Williams – 26/40, 332 yards, 2 TD

**Top rushers**

- DET – Jahmyr Gibbs – 23 rushes, 109 yards, TD
- CHI – Caleb Williams – 6 rushes, 34 yards

**Top receivers**

- DET – Jameson Williams – 5 receptions, 143 yards, TD
- CHI – Keenan Allen – 9 receptions, 140 yards, TD

In week 16, the Lions visited their division rival, the Chicago Bears. The Lions scored 13 points in the first period via a 30-yard field goal by Jake Bates, a one-yard touchdown run from Jahmyr Gibbs and a 34-yard field goal by Bates. The Lions scored 14 points in the second quarter via an 82-yard touchdown pass from Jared Goff to Jameson Williams and an eight-yard touchdown pass from Goff to Amon-Ra St. Brown. The Bears scored 14 points in the quarter via a one-yard touchdown pass from Caleb Williams to Cole Kmet and a 45-yard touchdown pass from Williams to Keenan Allen, which made the score 27–14 in favor of Detroit at half-time. The Lions extended their lead in the third quarter via a 21-yard touchdown pass from Goff to Sam LaPorta. The Bears responded with a 30-yard field goal by Cairo Santos. After a scoreless fourth quarter, the Lions won the game by a final score 34–17 in favor of Detroit. With the win, the Lions set a franchise record for wins in a season with 13.

==== Week 17: at San Francisco 49ers ====
Week 17: Detroit Lions at San Francisco 49ers – Game summary

Quarter	1	2	3	4	Total
**Lions**	6	7	18	9	**40**
49ers	7	14	7	6	**34**

at Levi's Stadium, Santa Clara, California

- Date: December 30
- Game time: 8:15 p.m. EST/5:15 p.m. PST
- Game weather: 48 °F (9 °C)
- Game attendance: 71,688
- Referee: Shawn Hochuli
- TV announcers (ESPN/ABC): Joe Buck, Troy Aikman and Lisa Salters
- Recap, Game Book

Game information

**First quarter**

- SF – Ricky Pearsall 3-yard pass from Brock Purdy (Jake Moody kick), 8:37. 49ers 7–0. **Drive: 11 plays, 61 yards, 6:23.**
- DET – Jameson Williams 3-yard run (kick blocked), 3:42. 49ers 7–6. **Drive: 9 plays, 65 yards, 4:55.**

**Second quarter**

- SF – Kyle Juszczyk 9-yard pass from Brock Purdy (Jake Moody kick), 14:53. 49ers 14–6. **Drive: 6 plays, 70 yards, 3:49.**
- DET – Jameson Williams 41-yard pass from Jared Goff (Jake Bates kick), 10:09. Lions 14–13. **Drive: 8 plays, 75 yards, 4:44.**
- SF – Brock Purdy 9-yard run (Jake Moody kick), 6:13. 49ers 21–13. **Drive: 7 plays, 70 yards, 3:56.**

**Third quarter**

- DET – Sam LaPorta 6-yard pass from Jared Goff (Jared Goff–Tim Patrick pass), 9:58. Tied 21–21. **Drive: 10 plays, 66 yards, 5:02.**
- SF – Deebo Samuel 5-yard pass from Brock Purdy (Jake Moody kick), 7:40. 49ers 28–21. **Drive: 6 plays, 84 yards, 2:18.**
- DET – Jake Bates 57-yard field goal, 4:25. 49ers 28–24. **Drive: 6 plays, 31 yards, 3:15.**
- DET – Amon-Ra St. Brown 4-yard pass from Jared Goff (Jake Bates kick), 0:19. Lions 31–28. **Drive: 8 plays, 43 yards, 3:39.**

**Fourth quarter**

- DET – Jake Bates 42-yard field goal, 10:29. Lions 34–28. **Drive: 8 plays, 28 yards, 2:56.**
- DET – Jahmyr Gibbs 30-yard run (kick failed, wide left), 2:58. Lions 40–28. **Drive: 7 plays, 62 yards, 4:36.**
- SF – Joshua Dobbs 7-yard run (kick failed, wide right), 0:43. Lions 40–34. **Drive: 11 plays, 72 yards, 2:15.**

**Top passers**

- DET – Jared Goff – 26/34, 303 yards, 3 TD
- SF – Brock Purdy – 27/35, 377 yards, 3 TD, 2 INT

**Top rushers**

- DET – Jahmyr Gibbs – 18 rushes, 117 yards, TD
- SF – Isaac Guerendo – 9 rushes, 34 yards

**Top receivers**

- DET – Jameson Williams – 5 receptions, 77 yards, TD
- SF – Ricky Pearsall – 8 receptions, 141 yards, TD

In week 17, the Lions visited the San Francisco 49ers, in a rematch of the 2023 NFC Championship Game. The 49ers opened the scoring in the first quarter via a three-yard touchdown pass from Brock Purdy to Ricky Pearsall. The Lions responded with a three-yard touchdown run from Jameson Williams. The 49ers scored 14 points in the second quarter via a nine-yard touchdown pass from Purdy to Kyle Juszczyk and a nine-yard touchdown run from Purdy. The Lions scored via a 41-yard touchdown pass from Jared Goff to Williams, which made the score 21–13 in favor of San Francisco at half-time. The Lions opened the scoring in the third quarter via a six-yard touchdown pass from Goff to Sam LaPorta, and a two-point conversion pass from Goff to Tim Patrick to tie the game. The 49ers responded with a five-yard touchdown pass from Purdy to Deebo Samuel to regain the lead. The Lions scored the final ten points of the quarter via a 57-yard field goal by Jake Bates and a four-yard touchdown pass from Goff to Amon-Ra St. Brown, to take their first lead of the game. The Lions scored nine points in the fourth quarter via a 42-yard field goal by Bates and a 30-yard touchdown run from Jahmyr Gibbs. The 49ers scored the final points of the game via a seven-yard touchdown run from Joshua Dobbs, making the final score 40–34 in favor of Detroit. With the win, the Lions became the only team during the 2024 NFL season to finish the season undefeated on the road with an 8–0 record, and the first team in franchise history to do so. They became the sixth team since the 2000 NFL season to accomplish this feat, and the first since the 2020 Kansas City Chiefs. The Lions also tied the NFL record with their sixth 40-point game of the season. It was also the first time that the Lions had won a game in the Bay Area since 1975, snapping a 14-game winless streak.

==== Week 18: vs. Minnesota Vikings ====
Week 18: Minnesota Vikings at Detroit Lions – Game summary

Quarter	1	2	3	4	Total
Vikings	0	6	3	0	**9**
**Lions**	7	3	7	14	**31**

at Ford Field, Detroit, Michigan

- Date: January 5
- Game time: 8:20 p.m. EST
- Game weather: None (indoor stadium)
- Game attendance: 64,774
- Referee: Brad Rogers
- TV announcers (NBC/Peacock): Mike Tirico, Cris Collinsworth and Melissa Stark
- Recap, Game Book

Game information

**First quarter**

- DET – Jahmyr Gibbs 25-yard run (Jake Bates kick), 1:43. Lions 7–0. **Drive: 9 plays, 78 yards, 5:18.**

**Second quarter**

- MIN – Will Reichard 25-yard field goal, 6:35. Lions 7–3. **Drive: 4 plays, 0 yards, 0:20.**
- MIN – Will Reichard 31-yard field goal, 0:20. Lions 7–6. **Drive: 9 plays, 45 yards, 3:17.**
- DET – Jake Bates 48-yard field goal, 0:00. Lions 10–6. **Drive: 3 plays, 30 yards, 0:20.**

**Third quarter**

- MIN – Will Reichard 51-yard field goal, 9:55. Lions 10–9. **Drive: 6 plays, 21 yards, 1:55.**
- DET – Jahmyr Gibbs 10-yard pass from Jared Goff (Jake Bates kick), 2:30. Lions 17–9. **Drive: 13 plays, 70 yards, 7:25.**

**Fourth quarter**

- DET – Jahmyr Gibbs 13-yard run (Jake Bates kick), 13:06. Lions 24–9. **Drive: 6 plays, 59 yards, 2:17.**
- DET – Jahmyr Gibbs 4-yard run (Jake Bates kick), 5:14. Lions 31–9. **Drive: 7 plays, 74 yards, 4:59.**

**Top passers**

- MIN – Sam Darnold – 18/41, 166 yards
- DET – Jared Goff – 27/33, 231 yards, TD, 2 INT

**Top rushers**

- MIN – Cam Akers – 6 rushes, 65 yards
- DET – Jahmyr Gibbs – 23 rushes, 139 yards, 3 TD

**Top receivers**

- MIN – Justin Jefferson – 3 receptions, 54 yards
- DET – Amon-Ra St. Brown – 6 receptions, 77 yards

To conclude the regular season, the Lions hosted their divisional rival, the Minnesota Vikings. The Lions opened the scoring in the first quarter via a 25-yard touchdown run from Jahmyr Gibbs. The Vikings scored six points in the second quarter via two field goals by Will Reichard, from 25-yards, and 31-yards, respectively. The Lions scored the final points of the half via a 48-yard field goal by Jake Bates as time expired, which made the score 10–6 in favor of Detroit at half-time. The Vikings scored in the third quarter via a 51-yard field goal by Reichard. The Lions responded with a 10-yard touchdown pass from Jared Goff to Gibbs. The Lions scored 14 points in the fourth quarter via two touchdown runs from Gibbs, from 13-yards, and four-yards, respectively, making the final score 31–9 in favor of Detroit. With their win (their fifth straight over Minnesota), the Lions clinched the NFC North division, their second consecutive sweep over the Vikings, the number 1 seed in the NFC, a first-round bye, and home-field advantage throughout the entire NFC playoffs. With his four touchdowns in the game, Gibbs set the single-season franchise record for touchdowns scored with 20. This victory also marked the first time that the Lions have swept their division in the NFL's modern era.

=== Standings ===
==== Division ====
NFC North
	W	L	T	PCT	DIV	CONF	PF	PA	STK
^{(1)} Detroit Lions	15	2	0	.882	6–0	11–1	564	342	W3
^{(5)} Minnesota Vikings	14	3	0	.824	4–2	9–3	432	332	L1
^{(7)} Green Bay Packers	11	6	0	.647	1–5	6–6	460	338	L2
Chicago Bears	5	12	0	.294	1–5	3–9	310	370	W1

==== Conference ====
NFC
Seed	Team	Division	W	L	T	PCT	DIV	CONF	SOS	SOV	STK
**Division leaders**
1	Detroit Lions	North	15	2	0	.882	6–0	11–1	.516	.494	W3
2	Philadelphia Eagles	East	14	3	0	.824	5–1	9–3	.453	.424	W2
3 (Note: Tampa Bay clinched the #3 seed over Los Angeles based on conference record. (Tampa Bay 8–4 to Los Angeles 6–6))	Tampa Bay Buccaneers	South	10	7	0	.588	4–2	8–4	.502	.465	W2
4 (Note: Los Angeles clinched the NFC West and #4 seed over Seattle based on strength of victory. (Los Angeles .441 to Seattle .424))	Los Angeles Rams	West	10	7	0	.588	4–2	6–6	.505	.441	L1
**Wild cards**
5	Minnesota Vikings	North	14	3	0	.824	4–2	9–3	.474	.408	L1
6	Washington Commanders	East	12	5	0	.706	4–2	9–3	.436	.358	W5
7	Green Bay Packers	North	11	6	0	.647	1–5	6–6	.533	.412	L2
**Did not qualify for the postseason**
8	Seattle Seahawks	West	10	7	0	.588	4–2	6–6	.498	.424	W2
9 (Note: Atlanta finished ahead of Arizona based on conference record. (Atlanta 7–5 to Arizona 4–8))	Atlanta Falcons	South	8	9	0	.471	4–2	7–5	.519	.426	L2
10	Arizona Cardinals	West	8	9	0	.471	3–3	4–8	.536	.404	W1
11	Dallas Cowboys	East	7	10	0	.412	3–3	5–7	.522	.387	L2
12	San Francisco 49ers	West	6	11	0	.353	1–5	4–8	.564	.402	L4
13 (Note: Chicago finished ahead of Carolina based on head-to-head victory.)	Chicago Bears	North	5	12	0	.294	1–5	3–9	.554	.388	W1
14 (Note: Carolina finished ahead of New Orleans based on strength of victory. (Carolina .329 to New Orleans .306))	Carolina Panthers	South	5	12	0	.294	2–4	4–8	.498	.329	W1
15	New Orleans Saints	South	5	12	0	.294	2–4	4–8	.505	.306	L4
16	New York Giants	East	3	14	0	.176	0–6	1–11	.554	.412	L1
**Tiebreakers** (Note: When breaking ties for three or more teams under the NFL's rules, they are first broken within divisions, then comparing only the highest ranked remaining team from each division.)

== Postseason ==
=== Schedule ===
Round	Date	Opponent (seed)	Result	Record	Venue	Recap
Wild Card	First-round bye					
Divisional	January 18	Washington Commanders (6)	L 31–45	0–1	Ford Field	Recap

=== Game summaries ===
==== NFC Divisional Playoffs: vs. (6) Washington Commanders ====
NFC Divisional Playoffs: (6) Washington Commanders at (1) Detroit Lions – Game summary

Quarter	1	2	3	4	Total
Commanders	3	28	0	14	45
Lions	7	14	7	3	31

at Ford Field, Detroit, Michigan

- Date: January 18, 2025
- Game time: 8:00 p.m. EST
- Game weather: None (indoor stadium)
- Game attendance: 64,774
- Referee: Ronald Torbert
- TV announcers (Fox): Kevin Burkhardt, Tom Brady, Erin Andrews and Tom Rinaldi
- Recap, Game Book

Game information

First quarter

- DET – Jahmyr Gibbs 1-yard run (Jake Bates kick), 7:36. Lions 7–0. Drive: 6 plays, 71 yards, 3:02.
- WAS – Zane Gonzalez 47-yard field goal, 3:50. Lions 7–3. Drive: 10 plays, 41 yards, 3:46.

Second quarter

- WAS – Brian Robinson Jr. 2-yard run (Zane Gonzalez kick), 10:55. Commanders 10–7. Drive: 11 plays, 78 yards, 5:00.
- DET – Sam LaPorta 2-yard pass from Jared Goff (Jake Bates kick), 7:44. Lions 14–10. Drive: 7 plays, 70 yards, 3:11.
- WAS – Terry McLaurin 58-yard pass from Jayden Daniels (Zane Gonzalez kick), 6:23. Commanders 17–14. Drive: 3 plays, 70 yards, 1:21.
- WAS – Quan Martin 40-yard interception return (Zane Gonzalez kick), 5:25. Commanders 24–14. Drive: 2 plays, -4 yards, 0:58.
- DET – Jameson Williams 61-yard run (Jake Bates kick), 4:01. Commanders 24–21. Drive: 3 plays, 73 yards, 1:24.
- WAS – Zach Ertz 5-yard pass from Jayden Daniels (Zane Gonzalez kick), 1:46. Commanders 31–21. Drive: 7 plays, 70 yards, 2:15.

Third quarter

- DET – Jahmyr Gibbs 8-yard run (Jake Bates kick), 6:57. Commanders 31–28. Drive: 11 plays, 91 yards, 5:56.

Fourth quarter

- WAS – Brian Robinson Jr. 1-yard run (Zane Gonzalez kick), 13:29. Commanders 38–28. Drive: 15 plays, 70 yards, 8:28.
- WAS – Jeremy McNichols 1-yard run (Zane Gonzalez kick), 7:31. Commanders 45–28. Drive: 8 plays, 66 yards, 4:33.
- DET – Jake Bates 28-yard field goal, 5:01. Commanders 45–31. Drive: 10 plays, 60 yards, 2:30.

Top passers

- WAS – Jayden Daniels – 22/31, 299 yards, 2 TD
- DET – Jared Goff – 23/40, 313 yards, TD, 3 INT

Top rushers

- WAS – Brian Robinson Jr. – 15 rushes, 77 yards, 2 TD
- DET – Jahmyr Gibbs – 14 rushes, 105 yards, 2 TD

Top receivers

- WAS – Dyami Brown – 6 receptions, 98 yards
- DET – Amon-Ra St. Brown – 7 receptions, 124 yards

In the Divisional Round, the Lions hosted the No. 6 seed Washington Commanders. The Lions opened the scoring in the first quarter via a one-yard touchdown run from Jahmyr Gibbs. The Commanders responded with a 47-yard field goal by Zane Gonzalez. The Commanders scored 28 points in the second quarter via a two-yard touchdown run from Brian Robinson Jr., a 58-yard touchdown pass from Jayden Daniels to Terry McLaurin, a 40-yard interception return by Quan Martin and a five-yard touchdown pass from Daniels to Zach Ertz. The Lions scored 14 points in the quarter via a two-yard touchdown pass from Jared Goff to Sam LaPorta and a 61-yard touchdown run from Jameson Williams, which made the score 31–21 in favor of Washington at half-time. The Lions scored the only points of the third quarter via an eight-yard touchdown run from Gibbs. The Commanders scored 14 points in the fourth quarter via a one-yard touchdown run from Robinson Jr. and a one-yard touchdown run from Jeremy McNichols. The Lions scored the final points of the game via a 28-yard field goal by Jake Bates, making the score 45–31 in favor of Washington. The Lions would fail to recover an onside kick attempt shortly thereafter. Despite the Commanders missing a 44-yard field goal on their ensuing possession, the Lions' loss was sealed after Goff threw his third interception with under 30 seconds left in the game. It was the Lions' first home playoff loss since the 1994 Playoffs. With the stunning loss, the Lions went one-and-done in the playoffs for the first time since 2016.
