= St. John Paul II Catholic High School (Florida) =

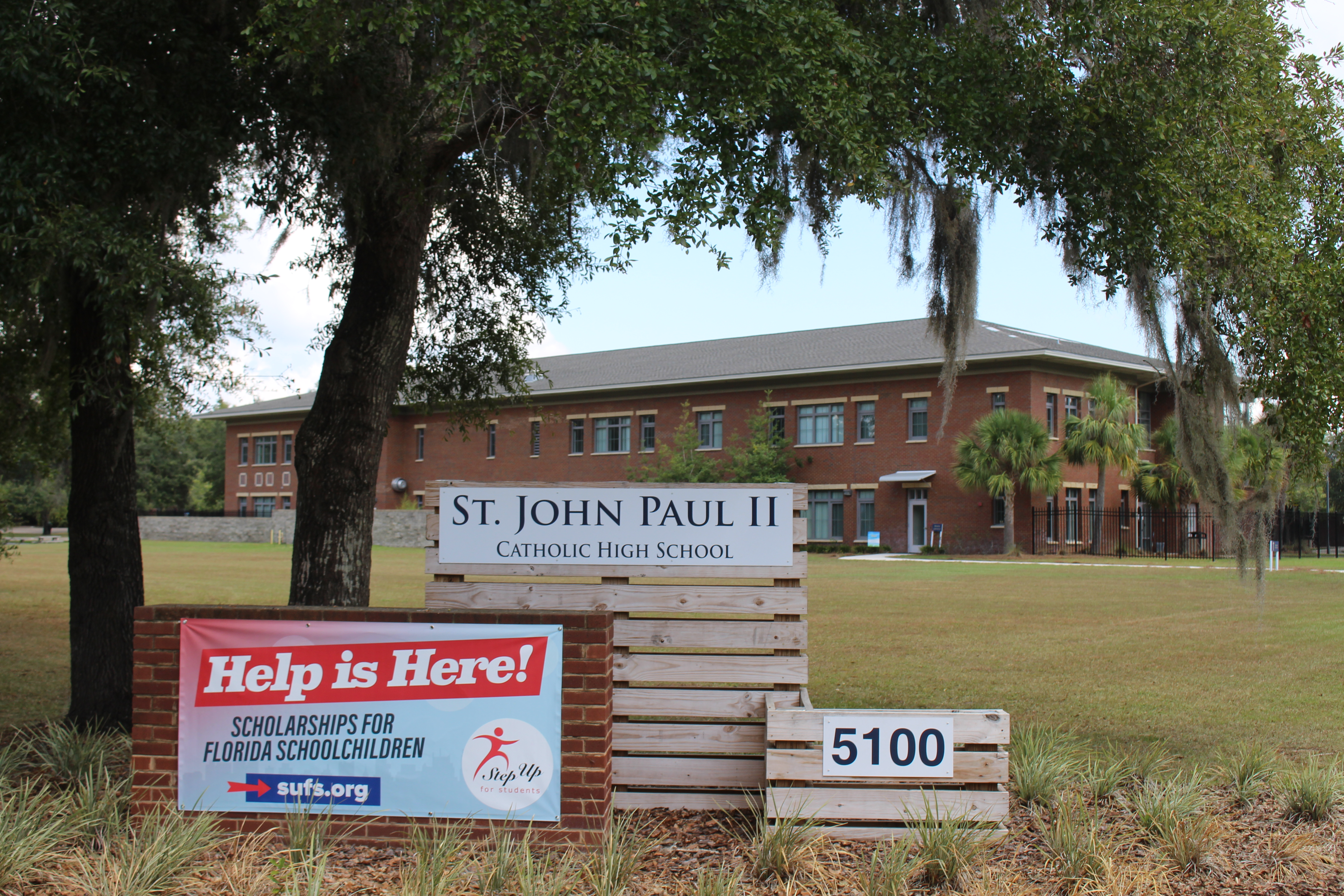

Location
- 5100 Terrebonne Drive; Tallahassee, Florida 32311; United States; 30°23′06″N 84°13′04″W

Information
- Type: Private, Coeducational, Catholic
- Religious affiliation: Roman Catholic
- Patron saint: Saint John Paul II
- Established: 2001
- School district: Diocese of Pensacola-Tallahassee
- Superintendent: Mike Juhas
- Principal: Eric Berrios
- Teaching staff: 18 (on a FTE basis)
- Grades: 9–12
- Student to teacher ratio: 9.1
- Campus size: 37 acres
- Colors: Blue and Gold
- Athletics conference: FHSAA 2-A
- Nickname: Panthers
- Rival: Maclay School
- Accreditation: Southern Association of Colleges and Schools
- Website: www.sjpiichs.org

St. John Paul II Catholic High School is a private, coeducational, Catholic high school in Tallahassee, Florida. It is a diocesan school of the Roman Catholic Diocese of Pensacola-Tallahassee and accredited by the Southern Association of Colleges and Schools.

SJPII, the first Catholic high school to be founded in Tallahassee, opened in 2001. It graduated its first class in 2004, with the first charter class graduating the next year, in 2005.

The St. John Paul II campus initially had a gymnasium, chapel, main building, soccer field, and baseball field. A softball field was added in 2013 and opened for the 2014 season The school has plans for future expansion.

== Academics ==
The school teaches several Advanced Placement Courses including:

- AP Spanish
- AP Biology
- AP Chemistry
- AP Latin
- AP Art and Design
- AP Calculus AB
- AP English Language and Composition
- AP Statistics
- AP Psychology

== Activities ==
The school also has a wide range of clubs, among them an Aerospace Engineering club, Kindness club, and Literary & Arts Magazine club.

SJPII has an active creative arts department that has competed in art competitions and exhibited at various Tallahassee museums and shows.

== Athletics ==
St. John Paul II High School's colors are Navy and Gold. SJPII has seven boys' athletic teams and eight girls' teams.

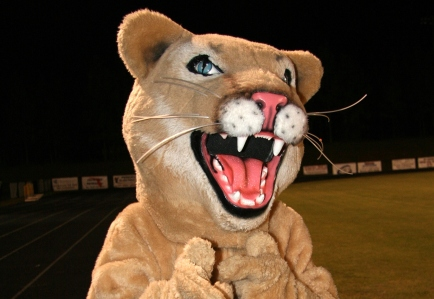
PEP, School Mascot

=== Boys' Sports ===
- Baseball
- Basketball
- Cross Country
- Golf
- Soccer
- Tennis
- Track

=== Girls' Sports ===
- Basketball
- Cross Country
- Golf
- Soccer
- Softball
- Track
- Volleyball
- Tennis

St. John Paul II School hosts the District volleyball, basketball and baseball events.

== Notable alumni ==
- Terrion Arnold, former college football cornerback for the Alabama Crimson Tide and former cornerback for the Detroit Lions.
