= D. J. Reader =

American football player (born 1994)

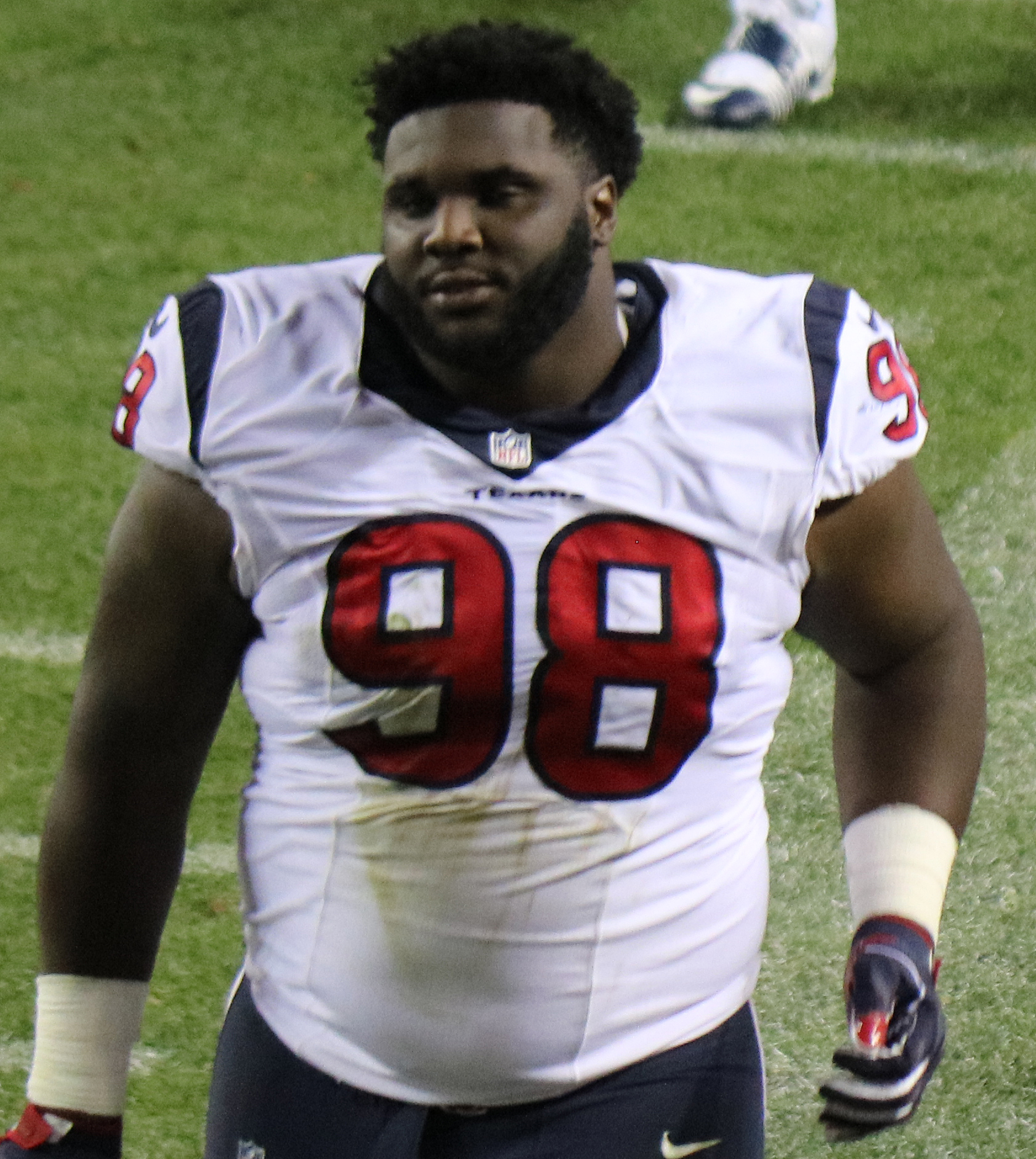
- Reader with the Houston Texans in 2016

No. 98 – New York Giants
- Position: Nose tackle
- Roster status: Active

Personal information
- Born: July 1, 1994 (age 32); Greensboro, North Carolina, U.S.
- Listed height: 6 ft 3 in (1.91 m)
- Listed weight: 335 lb (152 kg)

Career information
- High school: Grimsley (Greensboro)
- College: Clemson (2012–2015)
- NFL draft: 2016: 5th round, 166th overall pick

Career history
- Houston Texans (2016–2019); Cincinnati Bengals (2020–2023); Detroit Lions (2024–2025); New York Giants (2026–present)

Career NFL statistics as of Week 10, 2026
- Total tackles: 352
- Sacks: 13.5
- Forced fumbles: 1
- Fumble recoveries: 3
- Pass deflections: 9
- Stats at Pro Football Reference

David Vernon "D. J." Reader Jr. (born July 1, 1994) is an American professional football nose tackle for the New York Giants of the National Football League (NFL). He played college football for the Clemson Tigers and was drafted by the Houston Texans in the fifth round of the 2016 NFL draft. Reader has also played for the Cincinnati Bengals and Detroit Lions.

== College career ==
Reader played football and baseball at Clemson University. He was a pitcher for Tigers baseball in its 2013 season.

== Professional career ==
Pre-draft measurables
Height	Weight	Arm length	Hand span	Wingspan	40-yard dash	10-yard split	20-yard split	20-yard shuttle	Three-cone drill	Vertical jump	Broad jump	Bench press
6 ft 2 5/8 in (1.90 m)	327 lb (148 kg)	33 in (0.84 m)	9 1/2 in (0.24 m)	6 ft 8 1/4 in (2.04 m)	5.27 s	1.87 s	3.06 s	4.71 s	7.90 s	29.5 in (0.75 m)	8 ft 3 in (2.51 m)	30 reps
All values from NFL Combine/Pro Day

=== Houston Texans ===
Reader was selected by the Houston Texans in the fifth round (166th overall) of the 2016 NFL draft. The Texans had previously obtained the aforementioned pick in a trade that sent Keshawn Martin to the New England Patriots. He started seven games in his rookie year logging one sack, seven solo tackles and 15 assisted tackles.

In 2017, Reader replaced the retired Vince Wilfork as the Texans starting nose tackle. He started the first 14 games of the season before being placed on injured reserve on December 19, 2017.

During the 2018 season opener against the New England Patriots, Reader had the first multi-sack game of his career when he sacked Tom Brady twice.

In Week 3 of the 2019 season against the Los Angeles Chargers, Reader recorded 1.5 sacks on Philip Rivers in the 27–20 road victory.

=== Cincinnati Bengals ===
On April 2, 2020, Reader signed a four-year, $53 million contract with the Cincinnati Bengals. He was placed on injured reserve on October 12 with a quad injury.

Reader was named the starting nose tackle for the Bengals in 2021. He finished the season with 43 tackles and two sacks. In Reader's second season with the Bengals, the team won three playoff games to reach Super Bowl LVI. Reader recorded a sack in a 23–20 loss to the Los Angeles Rams. At the end of the 2021 season, Reader was the Bengals recipient of the Ed Block Courage award.

Reader suffered a knee injury in Week 3 of the 2022 season and was placed on injured reserve on September 29, 2022. He was activated on November 19, and played in each of the team's remaining seven regular season games, all victories. Cincinnati won the AFC North with a 12–4 record and entered the postseason on an eight-game winning streak. Reader recorded two solo tackles in the team's 24–17 win over the Baltimore Ravens in the Wild Card Round, and another two tackles (one solo) in a 27–10 victory over the Buffalo Bills in the Divisional Round.

For the third season in a row in 2023, Reader was named the team's starting nose tackle. His only sack of the season came in Week 3 against the Rams. During Week 15 against the Minnesota Vikings, Reader went down with an injury on the second play of the game. He was later diagnosed with a torn quadriceps tendon the following day, ending his 2023 campaign. Reader finished the season with 34 tackles, a sack, and a pass deflection.

=== Detroit Lions ===
On March 14, 2024, Reader signed a two-year deal with the Detroit Lions. He started 32 games in two seasons with Detroit, and recorded a career-high three sacks in 2024.

=== New York Giants ===
On May 5, 2026, Reader signed a two-year contract with the New York Giants.

== Personal life ==
Reader's father, David Sr., died from kidney failure on June 30, 2014. Reader's son was born in November 2019.

Reader’s devotion to community service has earned him recognition as a nominee for the Walter Payton NFL Man of the Year Award with both the Houston Texans in 2019 and the Detroit Lions in 2025. In Honor of his late father, Reader has been a long time supporter of the National Kidney Foundation, hosting charity walks and Golf tournaments. In 2022, Reader received the President's Lifetime Achievement Volunteer Service Award for over 4,000 hours of service. Reader also created the A Son Never Forgets Foundation, which holds annual football camp and provides free health and wellness programs for his local North Carolina community.

== NFL career statistics ==
Legend
**Bold**	Career high

=== Regular season ===
Year	Team	Games		Tackles					Interceptions						Fumbles			
Year	Team	GP	GS	Cmb	Solo	Ast	Sck	TFL	Int	Yds	Avg	Lng	TD	PD	FF	FR	Yds	TD
2016	HOU	16	7	22	7	15	1.0	2	0	0	0.0	0	0	1	0	0	0	0
2017	HOU	14	14	47	23	**24**	1.0	3	0	0	0.0	0	0	0	0	0	0	0
2018	HOU	16	16	33	23	10	2.0	5	0	0	0.0	0	0	0	0	0	0	0
2019	HOU	15	15	**52**	**28**	**24**	2.5	**6**	0	0	0.0	0	0	0	0	0	0	0
2020	CIN	5	5	19	8	11	0.0	1	0	0	0.0	0	0	2	0	0	0	0
2021	CIN	15	15	43	22	21	2.0	3	0	0	0.0	0	0	0	0	0	0	0
2022	CIN	10	10	27	18	9	0.0	1	0	0	0.0	0	0	**4**	**1**	**2**	0	0
2023	CIN	14	14	34	20	14	1.0	2	0	0	0.0	0	0	1	0	1	0	0
2024	DET	15	15	23	11	12	**3.0**	4	0	0	0.0	0	0	1	0	0	0	0
2025	DET	**17**	**17**	28	11	17	0.0	0	0	0	0.0	0	0	0	0	0	0	0
2026	NYG	9	9	24	16	8	1.0	3	0	0	0.0	0	0	0	0	0	0	0
Career		146	137	352	187	165	13.5	30	0	0	0.0	0	0	9	1	3	0	0

=== Postseason ===
Year	Team	Games		Tackles					Interceptions						Fumbles			
Year	Team	GP	GS	Cmb	Solo	Ast	Sck	TFL	Int	Yds	Avg	Lng	TD	PD	FF	FR	Yds	TD
2016	HOU	2	2	3	2	1	**1.0**	1	0	0	0.0	0	0	0	0	0	0	0
2018	HOU	1	1	6	3	3	0.0	0	0	0	0.0	0	0	0	0	0	0	0
2019	HOU	2	2	7	4	3	0.0	0	0	0	0.0	0	0	0	0	0	0	0
2021	CIN	**4**	**4**	**12**	**7**	**5**	**1.0**	**3**	0	0	0.0	0	0	0	0	0	0	0
2022	CIN	3	3	8	4	4	0.0	0	0	0	0.0	0	0	**1**	0	0	0	0
2024	DET	1	1	1	0	1	0.0	0	0	0	0.0	0	0	0	0	0	0	0
Career		13	13	37	20	17	2.0	4	0	0	0.0	0	0	1	0	0	0	0
