= Tim Patrick =

American football player (born 1993)

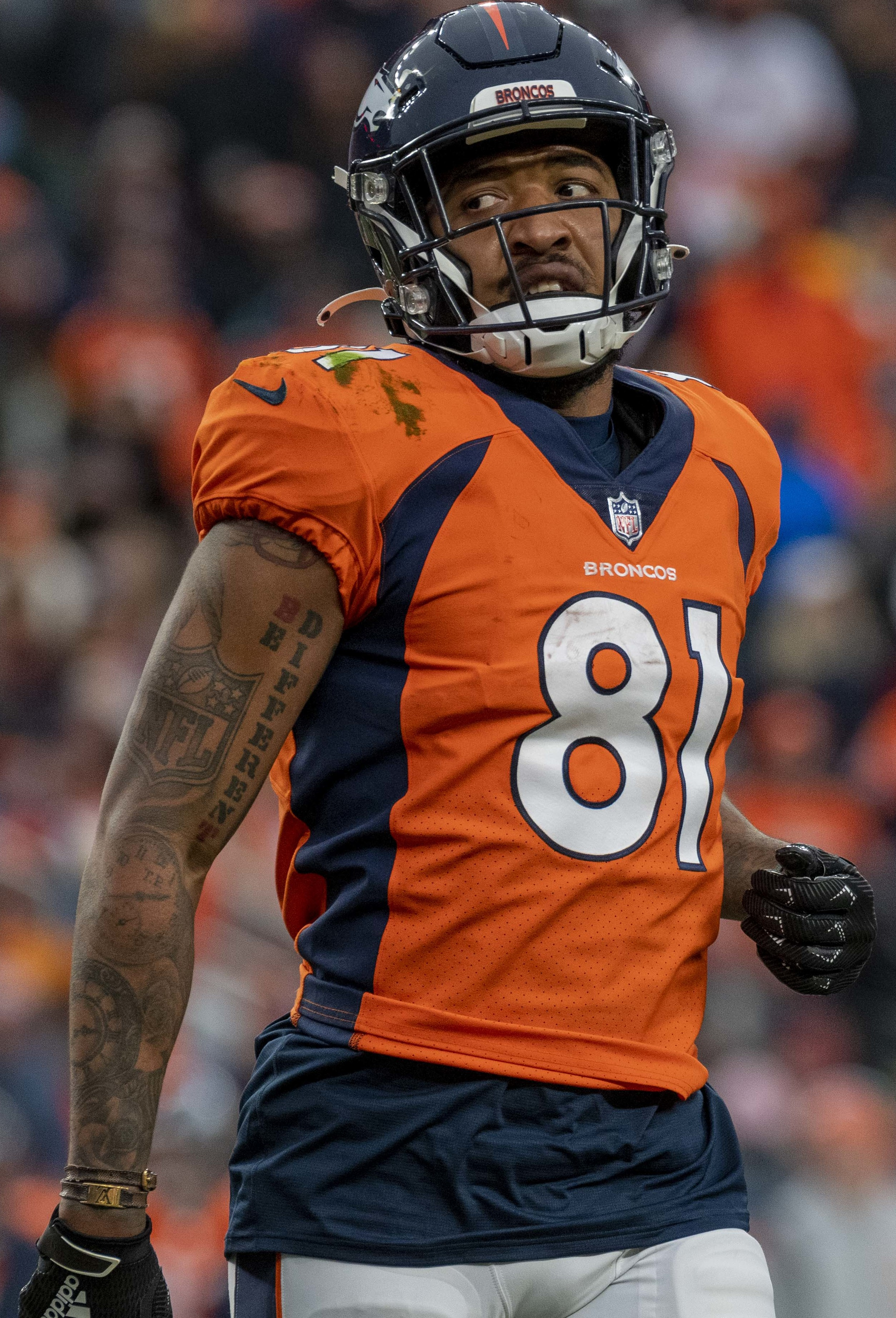
- Patrick with the Denver Broncos in 2021

No. 17 – New York Jets
- Position: Wide receiver
- Roster status: Active

Personal information
- Born: November 23, 1993 (age 32); San Diego, California, U.S.
- Listed height: 6 ft 5 in (1.96 m)
- Listed weight: 210 lb (95 kg)

Career information
- High school: University City (San Diego)
- College: Grossmont (2011–2013); Utah (2014–2016)
- NFL draft: 2017: undrafted

Career history
- Baltimore Ravens (2017)*; San Francisco 49ers (2017)*; Denver Broncos (2017–2023); Detroit Lions (2024); Jacksonville Jaguars (2025); New York Jets (2026–present)
- * Offseason or practice squad member only

Awards and highlights
- First-team All-PCAC (2013)

Career NFL statistics as of Week 5, 2026
- Receptions: 193
- Receiving yards: 2,616
- Receiving touchdowns: 18
- Stats at Pro Football Reference

Timothy Mychael Patrick (born November 23, 1993) is an American professional football wide receiver for the New York Jets of the National Football League (NFL). He played college football for the Utah Utes before being signed by the Denver Broncos in 2017. Patrick has also played for the Detroit Lions and Jacksonville Jaguars.

== Early life ==
Patrick was born in San Diego, California, to Marsi Lovett and Tim Patrick. He attended University City High School in San Diego, where he played high school football for the Centurions. Tim grew up in a single parent home with his mother, older brother and younger sister.

== College career ==
Prior to University of Utah, Patrick attended and played for Grossmont College in El Cajon, California. In his 2013 season with the Griffins, Patrick caught for 964 yards and eight touchdowns, earning All-PCAC honors. During his three seasons at Utah, he appeared in 22 games, finishing with 61 catches for 888 yards with five touchdowns total. Patrick missed 17 games due to injuries during his time there. In 2016, Patrick led the team with 45 receptions, 711 receiving yards, and five touchdown receptions.

== Professional career ==
Pre-draft measurables
Height	Weight	Arm length	Hand span	Wingspan	40-yard dash	10-yard split	20-yard split	20-yard shuttle	Three-cone drill	Vertical jump	Broad jump	Bench press
6 ft 4 1/8 in (1.93 m)	208 lb (94 kg)	33 5/8 in (0.85 m)	9 1/2 in (0.24 m)	6 ft 8 3/4 in (2.05 m)	4.47 s	1.56 s	2.56 s	4.38 s	6.99 s	37.5 in (0.95 m)	10 ft 8 in (3.25 m)	22 reps
All values from Pro Day

=== Baltimore Ravens ===
Patrick signed with the Baltimore Ravens as an undrafted free agent on May 5, 2017. He was waived by the Ravens on July 30.

=== San Francisco 49ers ===
On July 31, 2017, Patrick was claimed by the San Francisco 49ers. He was waived by San Francisco on September 1.

=== Denver Broncos ===
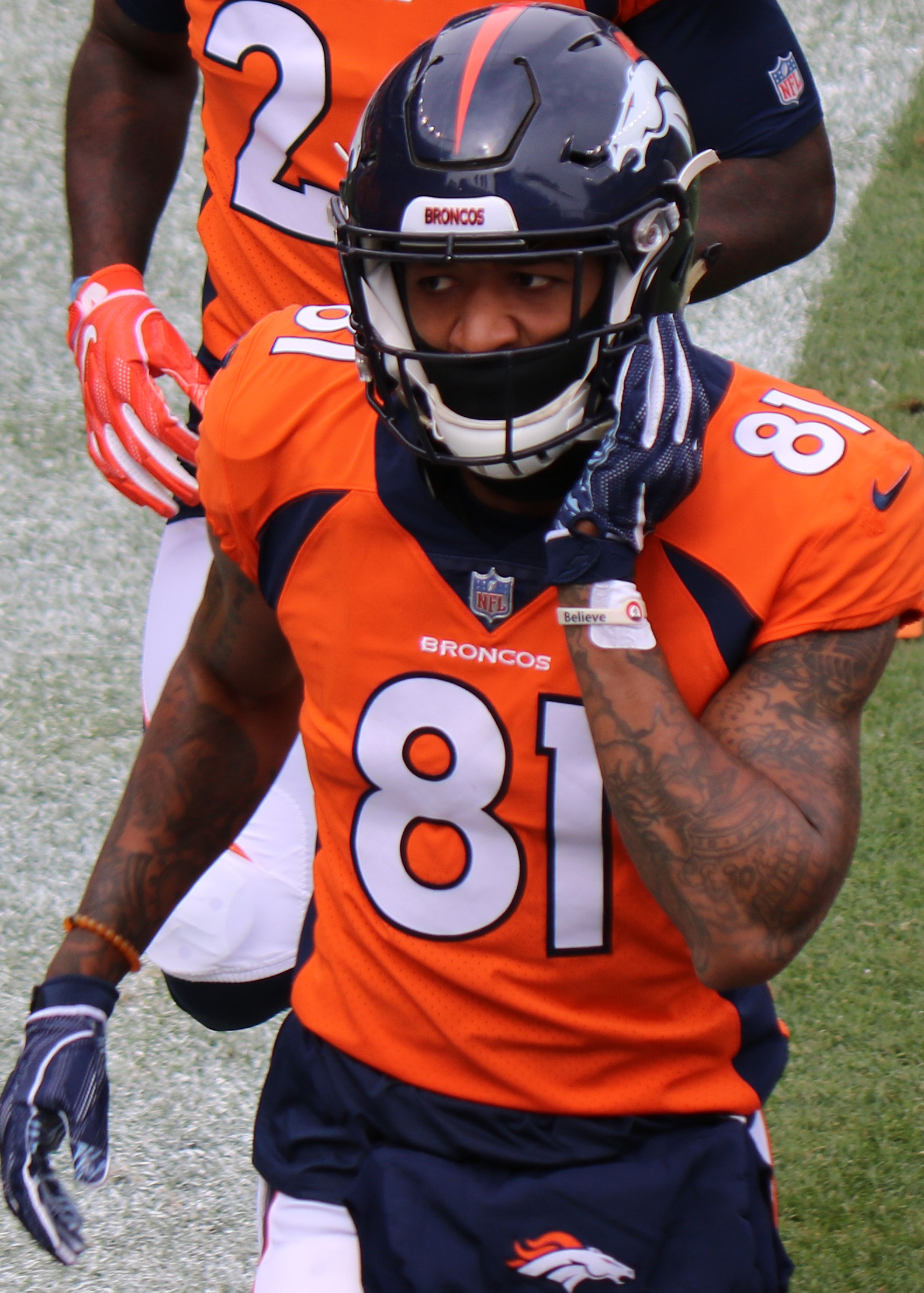
Patrick playing for the Broncos in 2018.

On October 21, 2017, Patrick was signed to the Denver Broncos' practice squad. He was released on November 8, and re-signed on November 15. Patrick signed a reserve/future contract with the Broncos on January 1, 2018.

In the Broncos' Week 2 victory over the Oakland Raiders, Patrick recorded a 26-yard reception for the first one of his professional career. His reception came late in the game as the Broncos' were driving and helped set up the game-winning field goal. In a Week 8 loss to the Kansas City Chiefs, he scored his first professional receiving touchdown on a 24-yard reception. In the 2018 season, he had 23 receptions for 315 yards and a touchdown.

On September 11, 2019, Patrick was placed on injured reserve after suffering a broken hand in Week 1. He was designated for return from injured reserve on October 30, and began practicing with the team again. On November 15, 2019, Broncos activated Patrick off injured reserve. In the 2019 season, he appeared in eight games and totaled 16 receptions for 218 receiving yards.

Patrick signed a one-year exclusive-rights free agent tender with the Broncos on April 18, 2020. In Week 4 of the 2020 season against the New York Jets on Thursday Night Football, he recorded a career-high six receptions for 113 yards and a touchdown in the 37–28 victory. In Week 10 against the Las Vegas Raiders, Patrick was ejected from the game after he punched Raiders' safety Johnathan Abram. Patrick was later punched by Abram's teammate Isaiah Johnson who was also ejected from the game. In Week 11 against the Miami Dolphins, Patrick recorded five catches for 119 yards, including a 61-yard catch on fourth down late in the fourth quarter to secure a 20–13 win for the Broncos. In Week 13 against the Chiefs, he had four receptions for 44 receiving yards and two receiving touchdowns, in a 22–16 loss on Sunday Night Football. He appeared in and started 15 games for the Broncos in 2020. He finished with 51 receptions for 742 receiving yards and six receiving touchdowns.

The Broncos placed a second-round restricted free agent tender on Patrick on March 16, 2021. He signed the one-year contract on May 18. On November 20, 2021, Patrick signed a three-year, $34.5 million contract extension with the Broncos. In the 2021 season, Patrick appeared in 16 games, all starts. He finished with 53 receptions for 734 receiving yards and five receiving touchdowns.

On August 2, 2022, Patrick suffered a torn ACL during practice, which prematurely ended his season. He was placed on injured reserve on August 3.

On July 31, 2023, Patrick was reported to have suffered a torn achilles during practice. He was placed on injured reserve on August 2.

On August 26, 2024, the Broncos announced that they would be moving on from Patrick, seeking to trade him. After failing to finalize a trade, the Broncos released him.

=== Detroit Lions ===
On August 27, 2024, Patrick was signed to the Detroit Lions' practice squad. He was signed to the team's active roster on September 24. On December 5, Patrick scored two touchdowns in a 34–31 win against the Green Bay Packers as the Lions clinched at least a wild card playoff spot. They were his first touchdowns in 1,082 days. He finished the 2024 season with 33 receptions for 394 yards and three touchdowns.

On March 14, 2025, Patrick re-signed with the Lions on a one-year, $4 million contract.

=== Jacksonville Jaguars ===
On August 27, 2025, Patrick was traded to the Jacksonville Jaguars in exchange for a 2026 sixth round draft pick. He had 15 receptions for 187 yards and three touchdowns in the 2025 season.

=== New York Jets ===
On May 14, 2026, Patrick signed with the New York Jets on a one-year, $2 million contract. On September 12, Patrick was placed on injured reserve due to a groin injury.

== Career statistics ==
=== NFL ===
Year	Team	Games		Receiving					Rushing					Fumbles	
Year	Team	GP	GS	Rec	Yds	Avg	Lng	TD	Att	Yds	Avg	Lng	TD	Fum	Lost
2018	DEN	16	4	23	315	13.7	26	1	3	17	5.7	13	0	2	1
2019	DEN	8	2	16	218	13.6	38	0	0	0	0.0	0	0	0	0
2020	DEN	15	15	51	742	14.5	61	6	0	0	0.0	0	0	0	0
2021	DEN	16	16	53	734	13.8	44	5	0	0	0.0	0	0	0	0
2022	DEN	0	0	Did not play due to injury											
2023	DEN	0	0	Did not play due to injury											
2024	DET	16	9	33	394	11.9	42	3	0	0	0.0	0	0	0	0
2025	JAX	16	3	15	187	12.5	37	3	0	0	0.0	0	0	0	0
2026	NYJ	1	1	2	26	13.0	14	0	0	0	0.0	0	0	0	0
Career		88	50	193	2,616	13.6	61	18	3	17	5.7	13	0	2	1

=== College ===
Year	School	Conf	Class	Pos	G	Receiving			
Year	School	Conf	Class	Pos	G	Rec	Yds	Avg	TD
2014	Utah	Pac-12	JR	WR	8	16	177	11.1	0
2016	Utah	Pac-12	SR	WR	10	45	711	15.8	5
Career	Utah				18	61	888	14.6	5
