= Terrion Arnold =

American football player (born 2003)

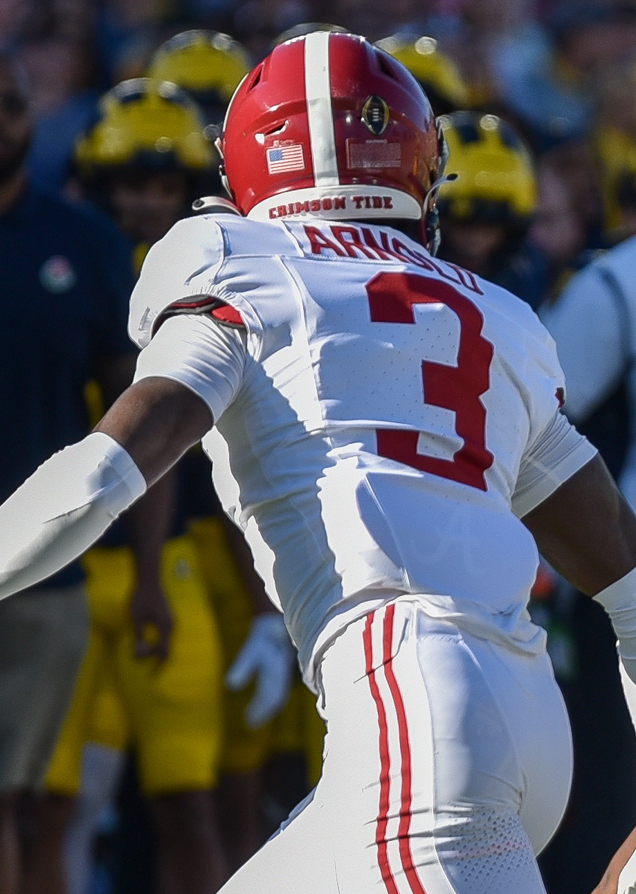
- Arnold with Alabama in 2024

No. 17 – Seattle Seahawks
- Position: Cornerback
- Roster status: Exempt/Commissioner's Permission

Personal information
- Born: March 22, 2003 (age 23); Tallahassee, Florida, U.S.
- Listed height: 6 ft 0 in (1.83 m)
- Listed weight: 195 lb (88 kg)

Career information
- High school: John Paul II Catholic (Tallahassee)
- College: Alabama (2021–2023)
- NFL draft: 2024: 1st round, 24th overall pick

Career history
- Detroit Lions (2024–2025); Seattle Seahawks (2026–present)

Awards and highlights
- First-team All-American (2023); First-team All-SEC (2023); Freshman All-American (2022); Freshman All-SEC Team (2022)

Career NFL statistics as of 2025
- Total tackles: 91
- Fumble recoveries: 1
- Pass deflections: 18
- Interceptions: 1
- Stats at Pro Football Reference

Terrion Bernard Arnold (born March 22, 2003) is an American professional football cornerback for the Seattle Seahawks of the National Football League (NFL). He played college football for the Alabama Crimson Tide, receiving All-American honors in 2023. Arnold was selected by the Detroit Lions in the first round of the 2024 NFL draft.

== Early life ==
Arnold was born on March 22, 2003, in Tallahassee, Florida. He attended John Paul II Catholic High School, where he played basketball and football. In football, Arnold caught 26 passes for 404 yards and three touchdowns as a wide receiver and 49 tackles, five pass deflections, and four interceptions as a safety. A four-star prospect, he would commit to play college football for the Alabama Crimson Tide.

== College career ==
In 2021, Arnold redshirted and did not play in any games. In week six of the 2022 season, Arnold recorded his first career interception off a pass by Haynes King before breaking up a pass in the end zone on the final play of the game to help the #1 Crimson Tide survive Texas A&M 24–20. In week 11, Arnold tallied ten tackles, two pass breakups, and a fumble recovery, as helped Alabama beat Ole Miss 30–24. Arnold finished the 2022 season with 45 tackles with one going for a loss, eight pass deflections, an interception, and a fumble recovery. For his performance on the season, Arnold was named a 2022 Freshman All-American by FWAA. In 2023, Arnold was named a first-team All-American after recording 63 tackles, 5 interceptions, a sack, and forced fumble. He declared for the 2024 NFL draft following the season.

== Professional career ==
Pre-draft measurables
Height	Weight	Arm length	Hand span	Wingspan	40-yard dash	10-yard split	20-yard split	20-yard shuttle	Three-cone drill	Vertical jump	Broad jump
5 ft 11 3/4 in (1.82 m)	189 lb (86 kg)	31 5/8 in (0.80 m)	8 7/8 in (0.23 m)	6 ft 4 1/4 in (1.94 m)	4.50 s	1.54 s	2.59 s	4.24 s	6.69 s	37.0 in (0.94 m)	10 ft 9 in (3.28 m)
All values from NFL Combine/Pro Day

=== Detroit Lions ===
The Detroit Lions selected Arnold in the first round (24th overall) of the 2024 NFL draft. The Detroit Lions initiated a trade that sent their first (29th overall) and third round (73rd overall) picks to the Dallas Cowboys in order to receive the 24th overall pick to draft Arnold and also received a seventh round pick in the 2025 NFL draft.

On June 13, 2024, the Detroit Lions signed Arnold to a four-year, $14.34 million contract that includes a signing bonus of $7.25 million and is fully guaranteed upon signing.

In 2025's Week 9 against the Minnesota Vikings, Arnold recorded his first career interception against J. J. McCarthy. He appeared in eight games (seven starts) for the Lions, recording one interception, eight pass deflections, and 31 combined tackles. On December 1, 2025, Arnold was placed on injured reserve due to a shoulder injury that required season-ending surgery.

During the 2026 offseason, Arnold learned that he would be competing to keep his starting role. Shortly following his arrest and being charged with kidnapping and robbery, Arnold was released by the Lions on June 29, 2026.

=== Seattle Seahawks ===
On August 29, 2026, Arnold signed with the Seattle Seahawks. He was placed on the commissioner's exempt list after his signing.

== NFL career statistics ==
Legend
**Bold**	Career high

=== Regular season ===
Year	Team	Games		Tackles					Interceptions						Fumbles			
Year	Team	GP	GS	Cmb	Solo	Ast	Sck	TFL	PD	Int	Yds	Avg	Lng	TD	FF	FR	Yds	TD
2024	DET	16	15	**60**	**47**	**13**	0.0	0	**10**	0	0	0.0	0	0	0	**1**	-1	0
2025	DET	8	7	31	23	8	0.0	0	8	**1**	0	0.0	0	0	0	0	**0**	0
Career		24	22	91	70	21	0.0	0	18	1	0	0.0	0	0	0	1	-1	0

=== Postseason ===
Year	Team	Games		Tackles					Interceptions						Fumbles			
Year	Team	GP	GS	Cmb	Solo	Ast	Sck	TFL	PD	Int	Yds	Avg	Lng	TD	FF	FR	Yds	TD
2024	DET	1	1	6	5	1	0.0	0	0	0	0	0.0	0	0	0	0	0	0
Career		1	1	6	5	1	0.0	0	0	0	0	0.0	0	0	0	0	0	0

== Personal life ==
Arnold has a close relationship with Terry Saban, the wife of Nick Saban, describing her as "like a best friend" and "a second mother".

Arnold is a cousin of professional soccer player Jordyn Bugg.

=== February 2026 robbery and kidnapping incidents ===
On the evening of June 24, 2026, Arnold was arrested and charged with kidnapping and robbery after turning himself in following a warrant issued in Florida. The charges include multiple felonies with the possibility of being sentenced to life in prison. The charges stem from multiple incidents during the first week of February 2026. In February, multiple individuals were accused of kidnapping three individuals on February 4 in Tampa, Florida and were arrested. The kidnapping was believed to be tied to an incident a few days prior where Arnold had claimed to have been robbed of over $250,000 worth of items. Arnold denied involvement in the kidnapping at the time. On June 24, prior to Arnold's arrest, two individuals pled guilty to the charges. In response to the arrest, the Detroit Lions issued a statement acknowledging the arrest, while declining to comment further.

The Lions released Arnold on June 29, after he was placed on house arrest, and his bail was set at $1 million.
