= Trevor Nowaske =

American football player (born 1998)

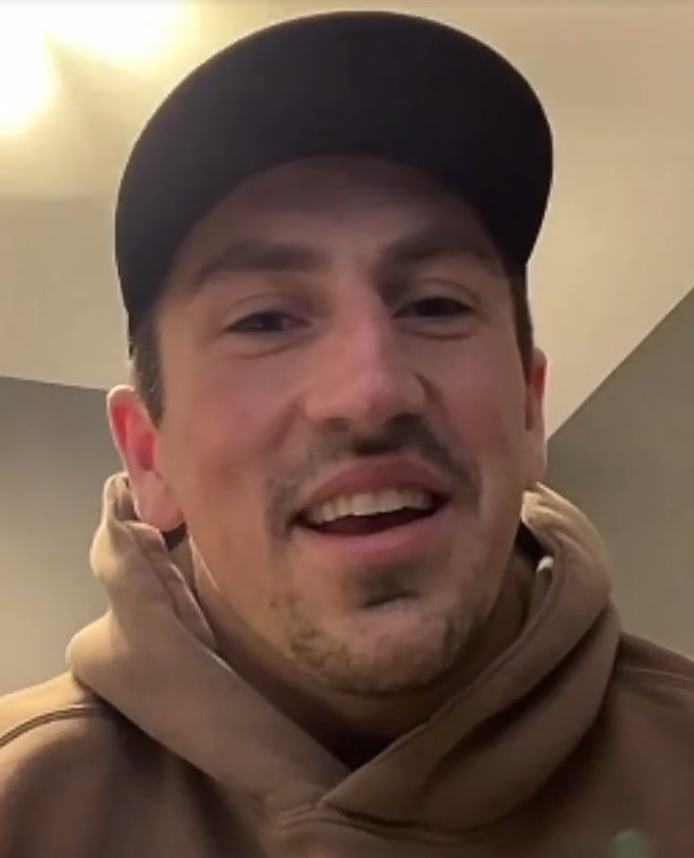
- Nowaske in 2025

No. 53 – Detroit Lions
- Position: Linebacker
- Roster status: Active

Personal information
- Born: November 7, 1998 (age 27); Canton, Michigan, U.S.
- Listed height: 6 ft 3 in (1.91 m)
- Listed weight: 237 lb (108 kg)

Career information
- High school: Salem High School (Canton)
- College: Saginaw Valley State (2017–2022)
- NFL draft: 2023: undrafted

Career history
- Detroit Lions (2023); Arizona Cardinals (2023)*; Detroit Lions (2024–present)
- * Offseason or practice squad member only

Career NFL statistics as of 2025
- Total tackles: 46
- Sacks: 3
- Fumble recoveries: 1
- Pass deflections: 1
- Interceptions: 1
- Stats at Pro Football Reference

Trevor Nowaske (born November 7, 1998) is an American professional football linebacker for the Detroit Lions of the National Football League (NFL). He played college football for the Saginaw Valley State Cardinals. He signed with the Detroit Lions as an undrafted free agent in 2023.

== Professional career ==
Pre-draft measurables
Height	Weight	Arm length	Hand span	Wingspan	40-yard dash	10-yard split	20-yard split	20-yard shuttle	Three-cone drill	Vertical jump	Broad jump	Bench press
6 ft 2 1/2 in (1.89 m)	237 lb (108 kg)	30 1/4 in (0.77 m)	10 in (0.25 m)	6 ft 5 in (1.96 m)	4.50 s	1.59 s	2.65 s	4.20 s	6.75 s	34.5 in (0.88 m)	10 ft 2 in (3.10 m)	25 reps
All values from Pro Day

=== Detroit Lions ===
On May 12, 2023, the Detroit Lions signed Nowaske to a three-year, $2.695 million contract as an undrafted free agent. He was waived by Detroit on August 29, and was re-signed to the team's practice squad. On November 2, Nowaske was signed to the active roster. He was waived by the Lions on December 28.

=== Arizona Cardinals ===
On December 29, 2023, Nowaske was claimed off waivers by the Arizona Cardinals. He was waived by the Cardinals on August 27, 2024.

=== Detroit Lions (second stint) ===
On August 28, 2024, the Detroit Lions claimed Nowaske off waivers. On October 27 against the Tennessee Titans, Nowaske recorded his first interception off of Mason Rudolph.

On March 14, 2025, Nowaske re-signed with the Lions.

On March 16, 2026, Nowaske re-signed with the Lions.
