= Ennis Rakestraw Jr. =

American football player (born 2002)

No. 2 – Detroit Lions
- Position: Cornerback
- Roster status: Active

Personal information
- Born: June 5, 2002 (age 24); Dallas, Texas, U.S.
- Listed height: 5 ft 11 in (1.80 m)
- Listed weight: 192 lb (87 kg)

Career information
- High school: Duncanville (Duncanville, Texas)
- College: Missouri (2020–2023)
- NFL draft: 2024: 2nd round, 61st overall pick

Career history
- Detroit Lions (2024–present)

Career NFL statistics as of Week 7, 2026
- Total tackles: 16
- Forced fumbles: 1
- Pass deflections: 2
- Stats at Pro Football Reference

Ennis Rakestraw Jr. (born June 5, 2002) is an American professional football cornerback for the Detroit Lions of the National Football League (NFL). He played college football for the Missouri Tigers. Rakestraw was selected by the Lions in the second round of the 2024 NFL draft.

== Early life ==
Rakestraw Jr. was born in Dallas, Texas, and attended Duncanville High School in Duncanville, Texas. As a senior in 2019, he was named the SportsDayHS Defensive Player of the Year by the Dallas Morning News. He committed to University of Missouri to play college football.

== College career ==
As a freshman at Missouri in 2020, Rakestraw started all 10 games and had 24 tackles and one sack. As a sophomore in 2021, he played in four games before suffering a torn ACL which ended his season. He returned from the injury to start all 13 games in 2022, finishing the season with 35 tackles and one interception. He returned to Missouri in 2023, finishing with 35 tackles, four passes defended and a forced fumble in nine games. Following the season he declared for the 2024 NFL draft.

== Professional career ==
Pre-draft measurables
Height	Weight	Arm length	Hand span	Wingspan	40-yard dash	10-yard split	20-yard split	20-yard shuttle	Broad jump	Bench press
5 ft 11 3/8 in (1.81 m)	183 lb (83 kg)	32 in (0.81 m)	8 1/2 in (0.22 m)	6 ft 3 5/8 in (1.92 m)	4.51 s	1.54 s	2.59 s	4.38 s	10 ft 0 in (3.05 m)	13 reps
All values from NFL Combine/Pro Day

Rakestraw was selected by the Detroit Lions with the 61st pick in the second round of the 2024 NFL draft.

On August 7, 2025, Rakestraw was placed on injured reserve after it was announced he would require shoulder surgery, ending his 2025 NFL season.
