= Tom Kennedy (wide receiver) =

American football player (born 1996)

No. 85 – Detroit Lions
- Position: Wide receiver / Return specialist
- Roster status: Injured reserve

Personal information
- Born: July 29, 1996 (age 30); Farmingdale, New York, U.S.
- Listed height: 5 ft 10 in (1.78 m)
- Listed weight: 195 lb (88 kg)

Career information
- High school: Farmingdale
- College: Bryant (2014, 2017–2018)
- NFL draft: 2019: undrafted

Career history
- Detroit Lions (2019–present)

Awards and highlights
- First-team All-NEC (2017)

Career NFL statistics as of 2026
- Receptions: 18
- Receiving yards: 231
- Return yards: 1,064
- Passing attempts: 1
- Passing completions: 1
- TD–INT: 1–0
- Passing yards: 75
- Stats at Pro Football Reference

Tom Kennedy (born July 29, 1996) is an American professional football wide receiver and return specialist for the Detroit Lions of the National Football League (NFL). He is also a former professional lacrosse player. He played college football for the Bryant Bulldogs.

== College career ==
Kennedy committed to play both football and lacrosse at Bryant University. He initially quit football after his freshman year in order to focus on lacrosse and was a first team All-Northeast Conference selection midfielder in 2017 as he helped the team to an appearance in the 2017 NCAA Division I Men's Lacrosse Championship. He ultimately decided to return to football going into his senior year and was named first team All-NEC after catching 57 passes for 888 yards and nine touchdowns, while also rushing 66 yards and three touchdowns on 12 carries. Kennedy was again named All-NEC at midfielder in his final lacrosse season. He returned to Bryant from playing professional lacrosse to play a final season of college football and had 33 receptions for 410 yards and a touchdown.

=== Statistics ===
Football

| Season | Team | Games | | Receiving | | | | Rushing | | | |
| Season | Team | GP | GS | Rec | Yds | Avg | TD | Att | Yds | Avg | TD |
|---|---|---|---|---|---|---|---|---|---|---|---|
| 2014 | Bryant | 1 | 0 | Redshirted (redshirt) | | | | | | | |
| 2017 | Bryant | 11 | 11 | 57 | 888 | 15.6 | 9 | 12 | 66 | 5.5 | 3 |
| 2018 | Bryant | 7 | 7 | 33 | 410 | 12.4 | 1 | 11 | 28 | 2.5 | 0 |
| Career | | 19 | 18 | 90 | 1,298 | 14.4 | 10 | 23 | 94 | 4.1 | 3 |

Lacrosse

| Season | Team | Games | | Scoring | | |
| Season | Team | GP | GS | G | A | Pts |
|---|---|---|---|---|---|---|
| 2015 | Bryant | 18 | 14 | 14 | 14 | 28 |
| 2016 | Bryant | 15 | 15 | 14 | 5 | 19 |
| 2017 | Bryant | 19 | 1 | 24 | 15 | 39 |
| 2018 | Bryant | 15 | 15 | 20 | 11 | 31 |
| Career | | 67 | 45 | 72 | 45 | 117 |

== Professional lacrosse career ==
Kennedy was selected in the third round of the 2018 Major League Lacrosse Draft by the Boston Cannons. He played in six games for the team during the 2018 season before leaving to play football at Bryant as a graduate student. He is one of two people (Chris Hogan) to play in both a pro lacrosse and football game.

== Professional football career ==
Pre-draft measurables
| Height | Weight | Arm length | Hand span | Wingspan | 40-yard dash | 20-yard shuttle | Three-cone drill | Vertical jump | Broad jump | Bench press |
|---|---|---|---|---|---|---|---|---|---|---|
| 5 ft 10 3/8 in (1.79 m) | 197 lb (89 kg) | 30 in (0.76 m) | 9 3/8 in (0.24 m) | 6 ft 0 3/4 in (1.85 m) | 4.55 s | 4.08 s | 6.66 s | 37.0 in (0.94 m) | 10 ft 4 in (3.15 m) | 22 reps |
All values from Pro Day

Kennedy signed with the Detroit Lions as an undrafted free agent on May 12, 2019, after participating in a rookie minicamp. He was waived on August 31, as part of final roster cuts at the end of training camp but was re-signed to the team's practice squad the following day. Kennedy was promoted to the Lions' active roster on September 27. Kennedy made his NFL debut on September 29, against the Kansas City Chiefs. He was waived on October 14 and re-signed to the practice squad. On December 30, Kennedy was signed to a reserve/future contract by the Lions.

On September 5, 2020, Kennedy was waived by the Lions and re-signed to the practice squad the next day. He signed a reserve/future contract with Detroit on January 5, 2021.

On October 17, 2021, due to injuries to fellow receivers Tyrell Williams and Quintez Cephus, Kennedy caught his first NFL catch in a 34–11 loss against the Cincinnati Bengals. In the same game, he also returned four kicks for 83 yards. He was waived on November 8, and re-signed to the practice squad. He was promoted back to the active roster on November 20. On January 9, 2022, Kennedy recorded his first NFL touchdown, throwing a 75-yard touchdown pass to Kalif Raymond on a trick play against the Green Bay Packers. The Lions went on to defeat the Packers, 37–30.

On August 30, 2022, Kennedy was waived by the Lions and re-signed to the practice squad the following day. He was promoted to the active roster on October 5. Kennedy was waived by Detroit on December 17 and re-signed to the practice squad.

Kennedy signed a reserve/future contract with the Lions on January 9, 2023. He was waived/injured on July 28, and placed on injured reserve. Kennedy and the Lions reached an injury settlement on August 7. On November 29, Kennedy was re-signed to Detroit's practice squad.

Kennedy signed a reserve/future contract with the Lions on January 30, 2024. Kennedy was released by the Lions on August 27, and was re-signed to the practice squad. He was promoted to the active roster on December 21. Kennedy was waived by the Lions on January 2, 2025, and re-signed to the practice squad.

Kennedy signed a reserve/future contract with the Lions on January 20, 2025. Kennedy was released by the Lions on August 26, as a part of final roster cuts, and was subsequently re-signed to the practice squad. He was promoted to the active roster on November 26. In six appearances for Detroit during the regular season, Kennedy recorded four receptions for 36 scoreless yards.

On March 12, 2026, Kennedy re-signed with the Lions. On August 30, Kennedy was released by Detroit as a part of final roster cuts; he was re-signed to the team's practice squad the following day. He was promoted to the active roster on September 10. On October 16, Kennedy was placed on injured reserve.

== Career statistics ==
MLL

| Year | Team | Games | Scoring | | |
| Year | Team | GP | G | A | Pts |
|---|---|---|---|---|---|
| 2018 | Boston | 6 | 0 | 1 | 1 |
| Career | | 6 | 0 | 1 | 1 |

NFL

| Year | Team | Games | | Receiving | | | | | Punt returns | | | | | Kick returns | | | | |
| Year | Team | GP | GS | Rec | Yds | Avg | Lng | TD | Ret | Yds | Avg | Lng | TD | Ret | Yds | Avg | Lng | TD |
|---|---|---|---|---|---|---|---|---|---|---|---|---|---|---|---|---|---|---|
| 2019 | DET | 1 | 0 | | | | | | | | | | | | | | | |
| 2020 | DET | 0 | 0 | DNP | | | | | | | | | | | | | | |
| 2021 | DET | 12 | 0 | 6 | 54 | 9.0 | 15 | 0 | | | | | | 4 | 89 | 22.3 | 28 | 0 |
| 2022 | DET | 7 | 1 | 8 | 141 | 17.6 | 44 | 0 | | | | | | | | | | |
| 2023 | DET | 0 | 0 | DNP | | | | | | | | | | | | | | |
| 2024 | DET | 4 | 0 | | | | | | 1 | 9 | 9.0 | 9 | 0 | 6 | 167 | 27.8 | 34 | 0 |
| 2025 | DET | 6 | 0 | 4 | 36 | 9.0 | 23 | 0 | 3 | 50 | 16.7 | 21 | 0 | 16 | 447 | 27.9 | 42 | 0 |
| 2026 | DET | 5 | 0 | 0 | 0 | 0 | 0 | 0 | 6 | 79 | 13.2 | 22 | 0 | 9 | 223 | 24.8 | 33 | 0 |
| Career | | 35 | 1 | 18 | 231 | 12.8 | 44 | 0 | 10 | 138 | 13.8 | 22 | 0 | 35 | 926 | 26.5 | 42 | 0 |
