= 2021 Detroit Lions season =

92nd season in franchise history

- Owner: Sheila Ford Hamp
- General manager: Brad Holmes
- Head coach: Dan Campbell
- Offensive coordinator: Anthony Lynn
- Defensive coordinator: Aaron Glenn
- Home stadium: Ford Field

Results
- Record: 3–13–1
- Division place: 4th NFC North
- Playoffs: Did not qualify
- Pro Bowlers: OG Jonah Jackson

Uniform
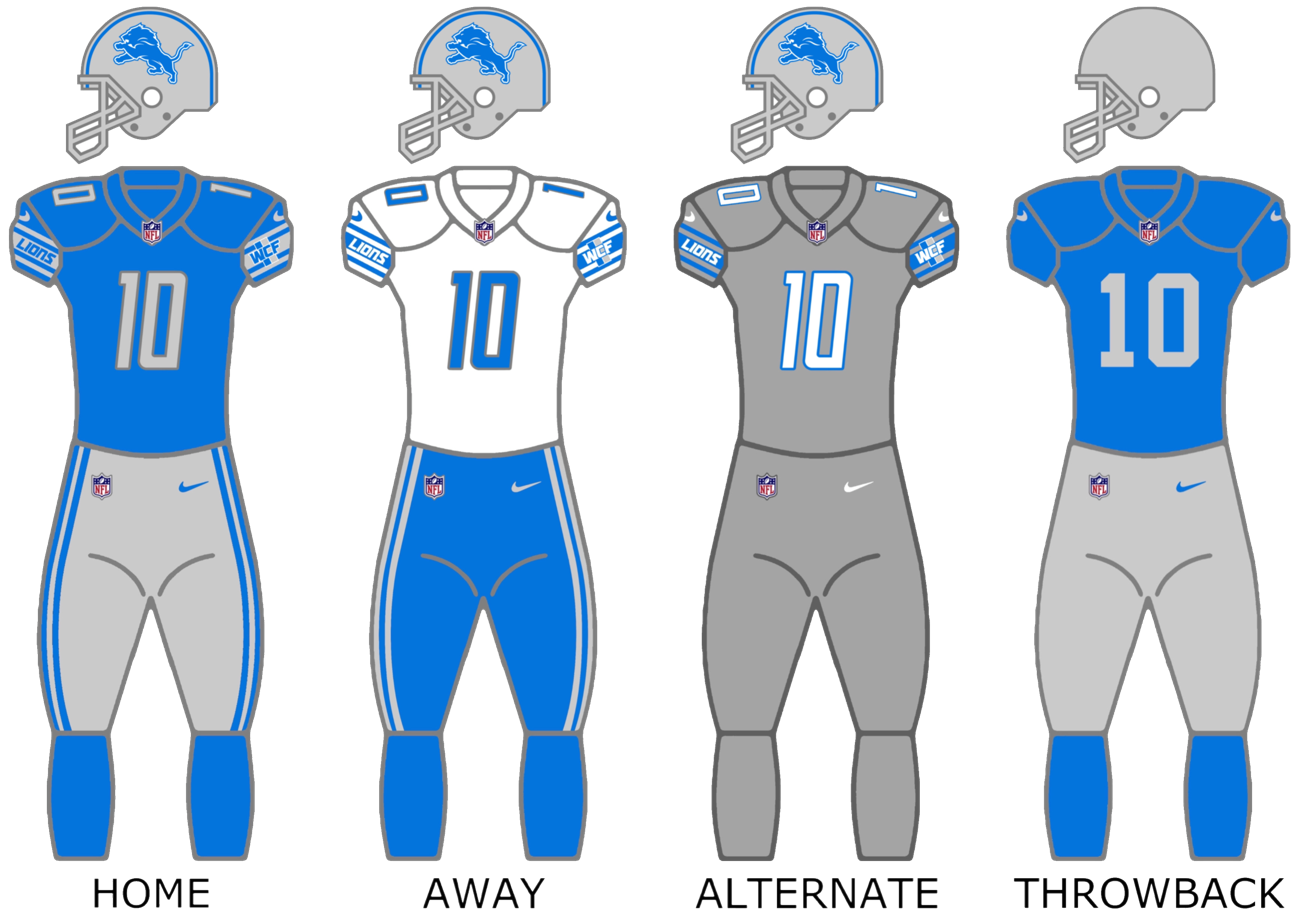

The 2021 season was the Detroit Lions' 92nd season in the National Football League (NFL), the 20th playing their home games at Ford Field and their first under the head coach/general manager tandem of Dan Campbell and Brad Holmes. The Lions finished 3–13–1, failing to improve upon their 5–11 record from the previous season. The Lions began their season 0–8 before tying with the Pittsburgh Steelers in Week 10, in which they nearly beat the Steelers in Pittsburgh for the first time since 1955. However, the Lions would not win a game until Week 13 against the division rival Minnesota Vikings, ending a 15-game, 364-day winless streak. In Week 14, the Lions were eliminated from playoff contention for the fifth consecutive year. They finished the season at the bottom of the NFC North for the fourth consecutive season. However they ended the season on a high note, upsetting two playoff bound teams; the Arizona Cardinals in Week 15 and the top-seeded Green Bay Packers in Week 18. Their .206 winning percentage was their worst since 2009.

This was the Lions' first season since 2008 without longtime quarterback Matthew Stafford, as he was traded to the Los Angeles Rams in exchange for quarterback Jared Goff and three draft picks on January 31, 2021. Stafford would go onto win his first Super Bowl in Super Bowl LVI with the Rams later that postseason. For first time since 2003, Don Muhlbach was not on the opening day roster, as he was released and subsequently retired in the offseason.

With the Cincinnati Bengals defeating the Las Vegas Raiders in the postseason, the Lions officially held the longest playoff victory drought in the NFL, having not won a playoff game since the 1991 season. As of the 2025 season, this is the most recent season the Lions have finished with a losing record. This would also be the last season the Lions finished last place in the NFC North until then.

== Offseason ==
=== Coaching changes ===
From January 19 to February 9, the Lions hired 13 coaches

- January 19: Aaron Glenn as defensive coordinator.
- January 20: Dan Campbell as head coach.
- January 23: Anthony Lynn as offensive coordinator.
- January 25: Aubrey Pleasant as defensive back coach and Duce Staley as running backs and assistant head coach.
- January 26: Dave Fipp as special teams coordinator.
- January 28: Mark Brunell as quarterbacks coach.
- January 29: Dom Capers as a senior defensive assistant.
- February 3: Todd Wash as defensive line coach, Kelvin Sheppard and Brian Duker as defensive assistants, and Seth Ryan as assistant wide receivers coach.
- February 9: Antwaan Randle El as wide receivers coach.

=== Additions ===
Date	Player	Position	Previous team	Contract	Source
March 3	Tyrell Williams	Wide receiver	Las Vegas Raiders	1 year / $4.7 million	
March 13	Josh Hill	Tight end	New Orleans Saints	1 year / $1.2 million	
March 16	Jamaal Williams	Running back	Green Bay Packers	2 years / $7.5 million	
March 17	Tim Boyle	Quarterback	Green Bay Packers	1 year / $2.5 million	
March 22	Breshad Perriman	Wide receiver	New York Jets	1 year / $3.0 million	
March 22	Randy Bullock	Placekicker	Cincinnati Bengals	1 year / $1.5 million	
March 23	Kalif Raymond	Wide receiver	Tennessee Titans	1 year / $1.0 million	
March 24	Damion Ratley	Wide receiver	Houston Texans	1 year / $0.9 million	
March 24	Alex Anzalone	Linebacker	New Orleans Saints	1 year / $1.8 million	
April 1	Corn Elder	Cornerback	Carolina Panthers	1 year / $0.9 million	
April 6	Quinton Dunbar	Cornerback	Seattle Seahawks	1 year / $1.0 million	
April 8	Dean Marlowe	Strong Safety	Buffalo Bills	1 year / $1.0 million	
April 30	Darren Fells	Tight end	Houston Texans	1 year	
May 12	Alex Brown	Cornerback	Kansas City Chiefs	1 year	
May 12	Alijah Holder	Safety	Denver Broncos	1 year	
May 12	Charlie Taumoepeau	Tight end	San Francisco 49ers	1 year	
May 19	Darrin Paulo	Offensive tackle	Denver Broncos		
May 27	Brian Price	Defensive tackle	Green Bay Packers	1 year	

=== Departures ===
Date	Player	Position	New Team	Source
March 8	Christian Jones	Linebacker	Chicago Bears	
March 8	Russell Bodine	Center		
March 12	Jesse James	Tight end	Chicago Bears	
March 12	Justin Coleman	Cornerback	Miami Dolphins	
March 15	Joe Dahl	Guard		
March 15	Jamal Agnew	Wide receiver	Jacksonville Jaguars	
March 15	Jarrad Davis	Linebacker	New York Jets	
March 16	Danny Shelton	Defensive tackle	New York Giants	
March 16	Chase Daniel	Quarterback	Los Angeles Chargers	
March 17	Marvin Jones	Wide receiver	Jacksonville Jaguars	
March 17	Matt Prater	Placekicker	Arizona Cardinals	
March 17	Desmond Trufant	Cornerback	Chicago Bears	
March 20	Kenny Golladay	Wide receiver	New York Giants	
March 24	Miles Killebrew	Linebacker	Pittsburgh Steelers	
March 27	Mohamed Sanu	Wide receiver	San Francisco 49ers	
April 15	Duron Harmon	Safety	Atlanta Falcons	
April 23	Hunter Bryant	Tight end		
May 1	Kerryon Johnson	Running back	San Francisco 49ers	
June 2	John Atkins	Defensive tackle	Atlanta Falcons	

=== Re-signings ===
Date	Player	Position	Contract	Source
March 8	Mike Ford	Cornerback	1 year / $1.2 million	
March 15	Romeo Okwara	Defensive end	3 years / $39 million	
March 17	Jalen Reeves-Maybin	Outside linebacker	1 year / $2.37 million	
March 19	Don Muhlbach	Long snapper		

=== Trades ===
- On March 17, the Lions acquired defensive tackle Michael Brockers from the Los Angeles Rams in exchange for a seventh-round draft pick in 2023.

=== Retirements ===
Position	Player	Date retired
TE	Josh Hill	May 5, 2021

== Draft ==
2021 Detroit Lions Draft
Round	Selection	Player	Position	College	Notes	Source
1	7	Penei Sewell	OT	Oregon		
2	41	Levi Onwuzurike	DT	Washington		
3	72	Alim McNeill	DT	NC State		
3	101	Ifeatu Melifonwu	CB	Syracuse	from Los Angeles Rams	
4	112	Amon-Ra St. Brown	WR	USC		
4	113	Derrick Barnes	LB	Purdue	from Cleveland Browns	
7	257	Jermar Jefferson	RB	Oregon State	from Cleveland Browns	

=== Pre-draft trades ===
- The Lions received a 2021 third-round selection as well as 2022 and 2023 first-round selections and quarterback Jared Goff from the Los Angeles Rams in exchange for quarterback Matthew Stafford.
- The Lions traded a conditional sixth-round selection, which could become a fifth rounder, to Dallas in exchange for defensive end Everson Griffen.
- The Lions traded safety Quandre Diggs and a 2021 seventh-round selection to Seattle in exchange for a 2020 fifth-round selection.

== Staff ==
2021 Detroit Lions staff
Front office: Owner – Sheila Ford Hamp; Vice chairpeople – William Clay Ford Jr., Martha Ford Morse and Elizabeth Ford Kontulis; Team president – Rod Wood; Special assistant to Chairman and President & CEO – Chris Spielman; Executive vice president/general manager – Brad Holmes; Assistant general manager – Ray Agnew; Senior vice president of football & business administration – Mike Disner; Vice president of player personnel – Vacant; Director of player personnel – Lance Newmark; Director of college scouting – Dave Sears; Director of pro scouting – Rob Lohman; Director of scouting advancement – Mike Martin; Senior personnel executive – John Dorsey; Head coaches: Head coach – Dan Campbell; Assistant head coach/running backs – Duce Staley; Offensive coaches: Offensive coordinator – Anthony Lynn; Quarterbacks – Mark Brunell; Wide receivers – Antwaan Randle El; Assistant wide receivers – Seth Ryan; Tight ends – Ben Johnson; Offensive line – Hank Fraley; Offensive quality control – Tanner Engstrand; Offensive quality control – Steve Oliver; WCF minority fellowship – Deon'tae Pannell	Defensive coaches: Defensive coordinator – Aaron Glenn; Defensive line – Todd Wash; Inside linebackers – Mark DeLeone; Outside linebackers – Kelvin Sheppard; Pass game coordinator/defensive backs – Aubrey Pleasant; Senior defensive assistant – Dom Capers; Defensive assistant – Brian Duker; Defensive quality control – Stephen Thomas; Special teams coaches: Special teams coordinator – Dave Fipp; Assistant special teams – Jett Modkins; Strength and conditioning: Director of sports performance – Mike Clark; Head strength & conditioning – Josh Schuler; Assistant strength & conditioning – Morris Henry

== Final roster ==
2021 Detroit Lions roster
Quarterbacks (QB): 10 David Blough; 12 Tim Boyle; 16 Jared Goff; Running backs (RB): 45 Jason Cabinda; 35 Godwin Igwebuike; 28 Jermar Jefferson; 46 Craig Reynolds; 32 D'Andre Swift; 30 Jamaal Williams; Wide receivers (WR): 17 Trinity Benson; 18 KhaDarel Hodge; 85 Tom Kennedy; 11 Kalif Raymond; 8 Josh Reynolds; 14 Amon-Ra St. Brown; Tight ends (TE): 80 Jared Pinkney; 89 Brock Wright	Offensive linemen (OL): 63 Evan Brown C; 68 Taylor Decker T; 69 Will Holden T; 73 Jonah Jackson G; 78 Tommy Kraemer G; 74 Ryan McCollum C; 67 Matt Nelson T; 58 Penei Sewell T; 72 Halapoulivaati Vaitai G; Defensive linemen (DL): 91 Michael Brockers DE; 96 Jashon Cornell DE; 54 Alim McNeill NT; 75 Levi Onwuzurike DE; 91 John Penisini NT; 97 Nick Williams DE	Linebackers (LB): 55 Derrick Barnes ILB; 43 Rashod Berry OLB; 49 Curtis Bolton ILB; 53 Charles Harris OLB; 52 Jessie Lemonier OLB; 99 Julian Okwara OLB; 57 Anthony Pittman ILB; 44 Jalen Reeves-Maybin ILB; Defensive backs (DB): 15 Brady Breeze SS; 42 Jalen Elliott FS; 40 Mark Gilbert CB; 25 Will Harris SS; 31 Dean Marlowe SS; 26 Ifeatu Melifonwu CB; 38 C. J. Moore FS; 41 A. J. Parker CB; 27 Bobby Price CB; 21 Tracy Walker FS; Special teams (ST): 47 Scott Daly LS; 3 Jack Fox P; 6 Riley Patterson K	Practice squad: 13 Geronimo Allison WR; 36 Corey Ballentine CB; 94 Eric Banks DE; 59 Tavante Beckett ILB; 65 Parker Ehinger G; 82 Nick Eubanks TE; 76 Bruce Hector DE; 83 Javon McKinley WR; 19 Steven Montez QB; 29 Parnell Motley CB; 66 Darrin Paulo T; 1 Nickell Robey-Coleman CB; 5 Aldrick Rosas K; 70 Dan Skipper T; 19 Saivion Smith CB; 86 Ross Travis TE; 84 Shane Zylstra TE (PS/I); Reserve: 34 Alex Anzalone ILB (IR); 2 Austin Bryant OLB (COVID-19); 86 Hunter Bryant TE (IR); 87 Quintez Cephus WR (IR); 65 Tyrell Crosby T (IR); 90 Trey Flowers OLB (IR); 50 Shaun Dion Hamilton ILB (IR); 79 Joel Heath DE (IR); 88 T. J. Hockenson TE (IR); 39 Jerry Jacobs CB (IR); 30 Jeff Okudah CB (IR); 95 Romeo Okwara OLB (IR); 24 Amani Oruwariye CB (IR); 77 Frank Ragnow C (IR); 4 Austin Seibert K (IR); 71 Logan Stenberg G (IR); -- Charlie Taumoepeau TE (NF-Inj.); 51 Josh Woods ILB (IR); Rookies in italics 53 active, 18 reserve, 16 practice squad (1 exempt)

== Preseason ==
The Lions' preliminary preseason schedule was announced on May 13. The exact dates and times were announced on May 20.

Week	Date	Opponent	Result	Record	Venue	Recap
1	August 13	Buffalo Bills	L 15–16	0–1	Ford Field	Recap
2	August 21	at Pittsburgh Steelers	L 20–26	0–2	Heinz Field	Recap
3	August 27	Indianapolis Colts	L 17–27	0–3	Ford Field	Recap

== Regular season ==
=== Schedule ===
The Lions schedule was released on May 13, 2021.

Week	Date	Opponent	Result	Record	Venue	Recap
1	September 12	San Francisco 49ers	**L** 33–41	0–1	Ford Field	Recap
2	September 20	at **Green Bay Packers**	**L** 17–35	0–2	Lambeau Field	Recap
3	September 26	Baltimore Ravens	**L** 17–19	0–3	Ford Field	Recap
4	October 3	at **Chicago Bears**	**L** 14–24	0–4	Soldier Field	Recap
5	October 10	at **Minnesota Vikings**	**L** 17–19	0–5	U.S. Bank Stadium	Recap
6	October 17	Cincinnati Bengals	**L** 11–34	0–6	Ford Field	Recap
7	October 24	at Los Angeles Rams	**L** 19–28	0–7	SoFi Stadium	Recap
8	October 31	Philadelphia Eagles	**L** 6–44	0–8	Ford Field	Recap
9	Bye					
10	November 14	at Pittsburgh Steelers	**T** 16–16 (OT)	0–8–1	Heinz Field	Recap
11	November 21	at Cleveland Browns	**L** 10–13	0–9–1	FirstEnergy Stadium	Recap
12	November 25	**Chicago Bears**	**L** 14–16	0–10–1	Ford Field	Recap
13	December 5	**Minnesota Vikings**	**W** 29–27	1–10–1	Ford Field	Recap
14	December 12	at Denver Broncos	**L** 10–38	1–11–1	Empower Field at Mile High	Recap
15	December 19	Arizona Cardinals	**W** 30–12	2–11–1	Ford Field	Recap
16	December 26	at Atlanta Falcons	**L** 16–20	2–12–1	Mercedes-Benz Stadium	Recap
17	January 2	at Seattle Seahawks	**L** 29–51	2–13–1	Lumen Field	Recap
18	January 9	**Green Bay Packers**	**W** 37–30	3–13–1	Ford Field	Recap

Note: Intra-division opponents are in bold text.

=== Game summaries ===
==== Week 1: vs. San Francisco 49ers ====
Week 1: San Francisco 49ers at Detroit Lions – Game summary

Quarter	1	2	3	4	Total
**49ers**	7	24	7	3	**41**
Lions	0	10	7	16	**33**

at Ford Field, Detroit, Michigan

- Date: September 12
- Game time: 1:00 p.m. EDT
- Game weather: None (indoor stadium)
- Game attendance: 59,374
- Referee: Brad Rogers
- TV announcers (Fox): Kevin Kugler, Mark Sanchez and Laura Okmin
- Recap, Game Book

Game information

**First quarter**

- SF – Trent Sherfield 5-yard pass from Trey Lance (Robbie Gould kick), 5:41. 49ers 7–0. **Drive: 7 plays, 59 yards, 3:55.**

**Second quarter**

- DET – T. J. Hockenson 6-yard pass from Jared Goff (Austin Seibert kick), 13:29. Tied 7–7. **Drive: 13 plays, 82 yards, 7:12.**
- SF – Elijah Mitchell 38-yard run (Robbie Gould kick), 11:12. 49ers 14–7. **Drive: 4 plays, 78 yards, 2:17.**
- DET – Austin Seibert 49-yard field goal, 6:13. 49ers 14–10. **Drive: 9 plays, 44 yards, 4:59.**
- SF – JaMycal Hasty 3-yard run (Robbie Gould kick), 2:25. 49ers 21–10. **Drive: 7 plays, 75 yards, 3:48.**
- SF – Dre Greenlaw 39-yard interception return (Robbie Gould kick), 1:10. 49ers 28–10.
- SF – Robbie Gould 40-yard field goal, 0:03. 49ers 31–10. **Drive: 7 plays, 50 yards, 0:41.**

**Third quarter**

- SF – Deebo Samuel 79-yard pass from Jimmy Garoppolo (Robbie Gould kick), 7:54. 49ers 38–10. **Drive: 5 plays, 91 yards, 2:22.**
- DET – D'Andre Swift 43-yard pass from Jared Goff (Austin Seibert kick), 4:23. 49ers 38–17. **Drive: 7 plays, 75 yards, 3:31.**

**Fourth quarter**

- SF – Robbie Gould 52-yard field goal, 9:53. 49ers 41–17. **Drive: 7 plays, 19 yards, 3:45.**
- DET – Jamaal Williams 1-yard run (Jared Goff–T. J. Hockenson pass), 1:53. 49ers 41–25. **Drive: 12 plays, 86 yards, 3:52.**
- DET – Quintez Cephus 2-yard pass from Jared Goff (Jared Goff–Quintez Cephus pass), 1:07. 49ers 41–33. **Drive: 6 plays, 59 yards, 0:46.**

**Top passers**

- SF – Jimmy Garoppolo – 17/25, 314 yards, TD
- DET – Jared Goff – 38/57, 338 yards, 3 TD, INT

**Top rushers**

- SF – Elijah Mitchell – 19 rushes, 104 yards, TD
- DET – Jamaal Williams – 9 rushes, 54 yards, TD

**Top receivers**

- SF – Deebo Samuel – 9 receptions, 189 yards, TD
- DET – T. J. Hockenson – 8 receptions, 97 yards, TD

The Lions hosted the San Francisco 49ers to kick off the regular season. The 49ers opened the scoring in the first quarter via a five-yard touchdown pass from Trey Lance to Trent Sherfield. The Lions responded with a six-yard touchdown pass from Jared Goff to T. J. Hockenson to tie the game. The 49ers added 24 points in the second quarter via a 38-yard touchdown run from Elijah Mitchell, a three-yard touchdown run from JaMycal Hasty, a 39-yard interception return by Dre Greenlaw and a 40-yard field goal by Robbie Gould. The Lions added 49-yard field goal by Austin Seibert, making the score 31–10 in favor of San Francisco at half-time. The teams exchanged touchdowns in the third quarter, first a 79-yard touchdown pass from Jimmy Garoppolo to Deebo Samuel for San Francisco, then a 43-yard touchdown pass from Goff to D'Andre Swift. The 49ers extended their lead in the fourth quarter via a 52-yard field goal by Gouble. The Lions added 16 points via a one-yard touchdown run from Jamaal Williams and a two-point conversion pass from Goff to Hockenson, and a two-yard touchdown pass from Goff to Quintez Cephus and a two-point conversion pass from Goff to Cephus. The Lions' attempted comeback failed when they failed to convert from the 49ers' 19-yard line late in the fourth quarter, making the final score 41–33 in favor of San Francisco.

==== Week 2: at Green Bay Packers ====
Week 2: Detroit Lions at Green Bay Packers – Game summary

Quarter	1	2	3	4	Total
Lions	7	10	0	0	**17**
**Packers**	7	7	14	7	**35**

at Lambeau Field, Green Bay, Wisconsin

- Date: September 20
- Game time: 8:15 p.m. EDT/7:15 p.m. CDT
- Game weather: Cloudy, 73 °F (23 °C)
- Game attendance: 77,240
- Referee: Adrian Hill
- TV announcers (ESPN/ESPN2): Steve Levy, Brian Griese, Louis Riddick, Lisa Salters and John Parry (ESPN)/Peyton Manning and Eli Manning (ESPN2)
- Recap, Game Book

Game information

**First quarter**

- DET – Quintez Cephus 5-yard pass from Jared Goff (Austin Seibert kick), 10:36. Lions 7–0. **Drive: 7 plays, 75 yards, 4:24.**
- GB – Aaron Jones 4-yard pass from Aaron Rodgers (Mason Crosby kick), 3:45. Tied 7–7. **Drive: 11 plays, 75 yards, 6:51.**

**Second quarter**

- DET – T. J. Hockenson 8-yard pass from Jared Goff (Austin Seibert kick), 7:22. Lions 14–7. **Drive: 9 plays, 61 yards, 4:59.**
- GB – Aaron Jones 1-yard pass from Aaron Rodgers (Mason Crosby kick), 1:52. Tied 14–14. **Drive: 10 plays, 56 yards, 5:30.**
- DET – Austin Seibert 43-yard field goal, 0:03. Lions 17–14. **Drive: 7 plays, 35 yards, 1:49.**

**Third quarter**

- GB – Robert Tonyan 22-yard pass from Aaron Rodgers (Mason Crosby kick), 10:26. Packers 21–17. **Drive: 8 plays, 87 yards, 4:34.**
- GB – Aaron Jones 11-yard pass from Aaron Rodgers (Mason Crosby kick), 0:07. Packers 28–17. **Drive: 11 plays, 75 yards, 5:46.**

**Fourth quarter**

- GB – Aaron Jones 1-yard rush (Mason Crosby kick), 12:42. Packers 35–17. **Drive: 5 plays, 23 yards, 2:21.**

**Top passers**

- DET – Jared Goff – 26/36, 246 yards, 2 TD, INT
- GB – Aaron Rodgers – 22/27, 255 yards, 4 TD

**Top rushers**

- DET – Jared Goff – 4 rushes, 46 yards
- GB – Aaron Jones – 17 rushes, 67 yards, TD

**Top receivers**

- DET – T. J. Hockenson – 8 receptions, 66 yards, TD
- GB – Davante Adams – 8 receptions, 121 yards

In week 2, the Lions visited their divisional rival the Green Bay Packers on Monday Night Football. The Lions opened the scoring in the first quarter via a five-yard touchdown pass from Jared Goff to Quintez Cephus. The Packers responded with a four-yard touchdown pass from Aaron Rodgers to Aaron Jones to tie the game. The Lions regained the lead in the second quarter via an eight-yard touchdown pass from Goff to T. J. Hockenson. The Packers again tied the game via a one-yard touchdown pass from Rodgers to Jones. The Lions responded with a 43-yard field goal by Austin Seibert, making the score 17–14 in favor of Detroit at half-time. The Lions were held scoreless in the second half. The Packers scored 14 points in the third quarter via a 22-yard touchdown pass from Rodgers to Robert Tonyan, and an 11-yard touchdown pass from Rodgers to Jones. The Packers extended their lead in the fourth quarter via a one-yard touchdown run from Jones, making the final score 35–17 in favor of Green Bay.

==== Week 3: vs. Baltimore Ravens ====
Week 3: Baltimore Ravens at Detroit Lions – Game summary

Quarter	1	2	3	4	Total
**Ravens**	0	10	6	3	**19**
Lions	0	0	7	10	**17**

at Ford Field, Detroit, Michigan

- Date: September 26
- Game time: 1:00 p.m. EDT
- Game weather: None (indoor stadium)
- Game attendance: 50,788
- Referee: Scott Novak
- TV announcers (CBS): Greg Gumbel, Adam Archuleta and A. J. Ross
- Recap, Gamebook

Game information

**First quarter**

- No scoring plays.

**Second quarter**

- BAL – Justin Tucker 39-yard field goal, 10:05. Ravens 3–0. **Drive: 6 plays, 25 yards, 2:21.**
- BAL – Devin Duvernay 19-yard pass from Lamar Jackson (Justin Tucker kick), 3:15. Ravens 10–0. **Drive: 8 plays, 65 yards, 3:39.**

**Third quarter**

- BAL – Justin Tucker 50-yard field goal, 12:16. Ravens 13–0. **Drive: 7 plays, 43 yards, 2:44.**
- DET – D'Andre Swift 2-yard run (Ryan Santoso kick), 5:21. Ravens 13–7. **Drive: 11 plays, 75 yards, 6:55.**
- BAL – Justin Tucker 32-yard field goal, 0:41. Ravens 16–7. **Drive: 10 plays, 61 yards, 4:40.**

**Fourth quarter**

- DET – Jamaal Williams 1-yard run (Ryan Santoso kick), 8:16. Ravens 16–14. **Drive: 12 plays, 75 yards, 7:25.**
- DET – Ryan Santoso 35-yard field goal, 1:04. Lions 17–16. **Drive: 9 plays, 62 yards, 4:21.**
- BAL – Justin Tucker 66-yard field goal, 0:00. Ravens 19–17. **Drive: 7 plays, 27 yards, 1:04.**

**Top passers**

- BAL – Lamar Jackson – 16/31, 287 yards, TD, INT
- DET – Jared Goff – 22/30, 217 yards

**Top rushers**

- BAL – Lamar Jackson – 7 rushes, 58 yards
- DET – D'Andre Swift – 14 rushes, 47 yards, TD

**Top receivers**

- BAL – Mark Andrews – 5 receptions, 109 yards
- DET – Kalif Raymond – 6 receptions, 68 yards

In week 3, the Lions hosted the Baltimore Ravens. After a scoreless first quarter, the Ravens scored ten points in the second quarter via a 39-yard field goal by Justin Tucker and a 19-yard touchdown pass from Lamar Jackson to Devin Duvernay, making the score 10–0 in favor of Baltimore at half-time. The Ravens extended their lead in the third quarter via two field goals by Tucker, from 50-yards, and 32-yards, respectively. The Lions finally got on the board via a two-yard touchdown run from D'Andre Swift. The Lions added ten points in the fourth quarter via a one-yard touchdown run from Jamaal Williams, and a 35-yard field goal by Ryan Santoso, giving the Lions their first lead of the game. The Ravens responded with an NFL-record 66-yard field goal by Tucker, making the final score 19–17 in favor of Baltimore. After the game, controversy arose when it was shown that the officials failed to call a delay of game on the Ravens at the Lions' 48 yard line with seven seconds left in the game, which would've pushed the Ravens to their own 47 yard line. Had the officials called the delay of game, the Ravens would've attempted a 71-yard field goal or had a 10-second runoff called against them.

==== Week 4: at Chicago Bears ====
Week 4: Detroit Lions at Chicago Bears – Game summary

Quarter	1	2	3	4	Total
Lions	0	0	7	7	**14**
**Bears**	7	7	10	0	**24**

at Soldier Field, Chicago, Illinois

- Date: October 3
- Game time: 1:00 p.m. EDT/12:00 p.m. CDT
- Game weather: Mostly cloudy, 72 °F (22 °C)
- Game attendance: 61,468
- Referee: Shawn Smith
- TV announcers (Fox): Gus Johnson, Aqib Talib and Megan Olivi
- Recap, Game Book

Game information

**First quarter**

- CHI – David Montgomery 4-yard run (Cairo Santos kick), 8:49. Bears 7–0. **Drive: 12 plays, 75 yards, 6:11.**

**Second quarter**

- CHI – David Montgomery 9-yard run (Cairo Santos kick), 14:51. Bears 14–0. **Drive: 6 plays, 89 yards, 2:53.**

**Third quarter**

- CHI – Damien Williams 4-yard run (Cairo Santos kick), 10:33. Bears 21–0. **Drive: 6 plays, 77 yards, 2:49.**
- DET – Kalif Raymond 4-yard pass from Jared Goff (Ryan Santoso kick), 3:19. Bears 21–7. **Drive: 6 plays, 44 yards, 3:22.**
- CHI – Cairo Santos 33-yard field goal, 0:10. Bears 24–7. **Drive: 7 plays, 60 yards, 3:09.**

**Fourth quarter**

- DET – Kalif Raymond 25-yard pass from Jared Goff (Ryan Santoso kick), 11:17. Bears 24–14. **Drive: 8 plays, 75 yards, 3:53.**

**Top passers**

- DET – Jared Goff – 24/38, 298 yards, 2 TD
- CHI – Justin Fields – 12/18, 215 yards, INT

**Top rushers**

- DET – Jamaal Williams – 14 rushes, 66 yards
- CHI – David Montgomery – 23 rushes, 106 yards, 2 TD

**Top receivers**

- DET – Quintez Cephus – 4 receptions, 83 yards
- CHI – Darnell Mooney – 5 receptions, 125 yards

In week 4, the Lions visited their divisional rival the Chicago Bears. The Bears opened the scoring in the first quarter via a four-yard touchdown run from David Montgomery. The Bears scored the only points of the second quarter via a nine-yard touchdown run from Montgomery, making the score 14–0 in favor of Chicago at half-time. The Bears scored ten points in the third quarter via a four-yard touchdown run from Damien Williams and a 33-yard field goal by Cairo Santos. The Lions finally got on the board via a four-yard touchdown pass from Jared Goff to Kalif Raymond. The Lions scored the only points of the fourth quarter via a 25-yard touchdown pass from Goff to Raymond, making the final score 24–14 in favor of Chicago.

==== Week 5: at Minnesota Vikings ====
Week 5: Detroit Lions at Minnesota Vikings – Game summary

Quarter	1	2	3	4	Total
Lions	3	3	0	11	**17**
**Vikings**	3	10	0	6	**19**

at U.S. Bank Stadium, Minneapolis, Minnesota

- Date: October 10
- Game time: 1:00 p.m. EDT/12:00 p.m. CDT
- Game weather: None (indoor stadium)
- Game attendance: 66,538
- Referee: Clete Blakeman
- TV announcers (Fox): Chris Myers, Daryl Johnston and Jen Hale
- Recap, Game Book

Game information

**First quarter**

- DET – Austin Seibert 39-yard field goal, 10:34. Lions 3–0. **Drive: 10 plays, 54 yards, 4:26.**
- MIN – Greg Joseph 38-yard field goal, 6:30. Tied 3–3. **Drive: 10 plays, 55 yards, 4:04.**

**Second quarter**

- MIN – Greg Joseph 38-yard field goal, 9:50. Vikings 6–3. **Drive: 11 plays, 45 yards, 6:04.**
- MIN – Alexander Mattison 15-yard pass from Kirk Cousins (Greg Joseph kick), 2:20. Vikings 13–3. **Drive: 8 plays, 88 yards, 4:16.**
- DET – Austin Seibert 52-yard field goal, 0:41. Vikings 13–6. **Drive: 9 plays, 41 yards, 1:39.**

**Third quarter**

- No scoring plays.

**Fourth quarter**

- MIN – Greg Joseph 55-yard field goal, 4:28. Vikings 16–6. **Drive: 10 plays, 43 yards, 5:11.**
- DET – Austin Seibert 40-yard field goal, 2:30. Vikings 16–9. **Drive: 6 plays, 39 yards, 0:47.**
- DET – D'Andre Swift 7-yard run (Jared Goff–KhaDarel Hodge pass), 0:37. Lions 17–16. **Drive: 3 plays, 20 yards, 1:19.**
- MIN – Greg Joseph 54-yard field goal, 0:00. Vikings 19–17. **Drive: 5 plays, 46 yards, 0:37.**

**Top passers**

- DET – Jared Goff – 21/35, 203 yards, INT
- MIN – Kirk Cousins – 25/34, 275 yards, TD, INT

**Top rushers**

- DET – Jamaal Williams – 13 rushes, 57 yards
- MIN – Alexander Mattison – 25 rushes, 113 yards

**Top receivers**

- DET – Amon-Ra St. Brown – 7 receptions, 65 yards
- MIN – Justin Jefferson – 7 receptions, 124 yards

In week 5, the Lions visited their divisional rival the Minnesota Vikings. The teams exchanged field goals in the first quarter, first a 39-yard field goal by Austin Seibert for the Lions, then a 38-yard field goal by Greg Joseph for the Vikings. The Vikings added 10 points in the second quarter via a 38-yard field goal by Joseph, and a 15-yard touchdown pass from Kirk Cousins to Alexander Mattison. The Lions responded with a 52-yard field goal by Seibert, making the score 13–6 in favor of Minnesota at half-time. After a scoreless third quarter, the Vikings extended their lead in the fourth quarter via a 55-yard field goal by Joseph. The Lions responded with 11 points via a 40-yard field goal by Seibert and a seven-yard touchdown run from D'Andre Swift and a two-point conversion pass from Jared Goff to KhaDarel Hodge, giving the Lions the lead with 37 seconds left in the quarter. The Vikings responded with a 54-yard field goal by Joseph as time expired, making the final score 19–17 in favor of Minnesota.

==== Week 6: vs. Cincinnati Bengals ====
Week 6: Cincinnati Bengals at Detroit Lions – Game summary

Quarter	1	2	3	4	Total
**Bengals**	7	3	10	14	**34**
Lions	0	0	0	11	**11**

at Ford Field, Detroit, Michigan

- Date: October 17
- Game time: 1:00 p.m. EDT
- Game weather: None (indoor stadium)
- Game attendance: 50,831
- Referee: Shawn Hochuli
- TV announcers (Fox): Chris Myers, Daryl Johnston and Jen Hale
- Recap, Game Book

Game information

**First quarter**

- CIN – Chris Evans 24-yard pass from Joe Burrow (Evan McPherson kick), 8:26. Bengals 7–0. **Drive: 8 plays, 61 yards, 4:20.**

**Second quarter**

- CIN – Evan McPherson 38-yard field goal, 0:00. Bengals 10–0. **Drive: 9 plays, 56 yards, 1:21.**

**Third quarter**

- CIN – Joe Mixon 40-yard pass from Joe Burrow (Evan McPherson kick), 10:40. Bengals 17–0. **Drive: 8 plays, 75 yards, 4:20.**
- CIN – Evan McPherson 40-yard field goal, 3:38. Bengals 20–0. **Drive: 11 plays, 58 yards, 5:35.**

**Fourth quarter**

- CIN – C. J. Uzomah 2-yard pass from Joe Burrow (Evan McPherson kick), 12:38. Bengals 27–0. **Drive: 8 plays, 95 yards, 4:52.**
- DET – Austin Seibert 35-yard field goal, 8:36. Bengals 27–3. **Drive: 13 plays, 58 yards, 4:02.**
- CIN – Auden Tate 7-yard pass from Brandon Allen (Evan McPherson kick), 5:16. Bengals 34–3. **Drive: 5 plays, 44 yards, 3:20.**
- DET – D'Andre Swift 1-yard run (Jared Goff–Amon-Ra St. Brown pass), 2:15. Bengals 34–11. **Drive: 13 plays, 75 yards, 3:01.**

**Top passers**

- CIN – Joe Burrow – 19/29, 271 yards, 3 TD, INT
- DET – Jared Goff – 28/42, 202 yards, INT

**Top rushers**

- CIN – Joe Mixon – 18 rushes, 94 yards
- DET – D'Andre Swift – 13 rushes, 24 yards, TD

**Top receivers**

- CIN – Ja'Marr Chase – 4 receptions, 97 yards
- DET – T. J. Hockenson – 8 receptions, 74 yards

In week 6, the Lions hosted the Cincinnati Bengals. The Bengals opened the scoring in the first quarter via a 24-yard touchdown pass from Joe Burrow to Chris Evans. The Bengals extended their lead in the second quarter via a 38-yard field goal by Evan McPherson, making the score 10–0 in favor of Cincinnati at half-time. The Bengals added 10 points in the third quarter via a 40-yard touchdown pass from Burrow to Joe Mixon and a 40-yard field goal by McPherson. The Bengals extended their lead in the fourth quarter via a two-yard touchdown pass from Burrow to C. J. Uzomah. The Lions finally got on the board via a 35-yard field goal Austin Seibert. The teams exchanged touchdowns, first a seven-yard touchdown pass from Brandon Allen to Auden Tate for the Bengals, then a one-yard touchdown run from D'Andre Swift and a two-point conversion pass from Jared Goff to Amon-Ra St. Brown for the Lions, making the final score 34–11 in favor of Cincinnati. With the loss, the Lions fell to 0–6 to start the season for the first time since 2008 when they finished the season 0–16. With the Jaguars' first win over the Dolphins earlier in the day, the Lions became the NFL's lone winless team. The Lions once again failed to beat the Bengals, not having done so since 1992, and extended their losing streak against them to 7 games.

==== Week 7: at Los Angeles Rams ====
Week 7: Detroit Lions at Los Angeles Rams – Game summary

Quarter	1	2	3	4	Total
Lions	10	6	3	0	**19**
**Rams**	3	14	0	11	**28**

at SoFi Stadium, Inglewood, California

- Date: October 24
- Game time: 4:05 p.m. EDT/1:05 p.m. PDT
- Game weather: Cloudy, 66 °F (19 °C)
- Game attendance: 70,540
- Referee: Bill Vinovich
- TV announcers (Fox): Kevin Kugler, Mark Sanchez and Laura Okmin
- Recap, Game Book

Game information

**First quarter**

- DET – D'Andre Swift 63-yard pass from Jared Goff (Austin Seibert kick), 12:07. Lions 7–0. **Drive: 6 plays, 75 yards, 2:53.**
- DET – Austin Seibert 37-yard field goal, 7:28. Lions 10–0. **Drive: 10 plays, 35 yards, 4:39.**
- LA – Matt Gay 33-yard field goal, 2:55. Lions 10–3. **Drive: 10 plays, 67 yards, 4:33.**

**Second quarter**

- DET – Austin Seibert 47-yard field goal, 13:40. Lions 13–3. **Drive: 8 plays, 46 yards, 4:15.**
- LA – Van Jefferson 11-yard pass from Matthew Stafford (Matt Gay kick), 8:36. Lions 13–10. **Drive: 11 plays, 84 yards, 5:04.**
- LA – Cooper Kupp 2-yard pass from Matthew Stafford (Matt Gay kick), 1:23. Rams 17–13. **Drive: 11 plays, 74 yards, 5:44.**
- DET – Austin Seibert 41-yard field goal, 0:04. Rams 17–16. **Drive: 8 plays, 52 yards, 1:19.**

**Third quarter**

- DET – Austin Seibert 31-yard field goal, 1:43. Lions 19–17. **Drive: 6 plays, 41 yards, 2:13.**

**Fourth quarter**

- LA – Cooper Kupp 5-yard pass from Matthew Stafford (Matthew Stafford–Robert Woods pass), 13:59. Rams 25–19. **Drive: 8 plays, 90 yards, 2:44.**
- LA – Matt Gay 47-yard field goal, 0:58. Rams 28–19. **Drive: 9 plays, 48 yards, 3:55.**

**Top passers**

- DET – Jared Goff – 22/36, 268 yards, TD, 2 INT
- LA – Matthew Stafford – 28/41, 334 yards, 3 TD

**Top rushers**

- DET – Jamaal Williams – 12 rushes, 57 yards
- LA – Darrell Henderson – 15 rushes, 45 yards

**Top receivers**

- DET – Kalif Raymond – 6 receptions, 115 yards
- LA – Cooper Kupp – 10 receptions, 156 yards, 2 TD

In week 7, the Lions visited the Los Angeles Rams. The Lions faced their former quarterback, Matthew Stafford, for the first time since being traded in the offseason, while current Lions quarterback Jared Goff also faced his former team. It was also the Lions' first game at SoFi Stadium. The Lions opened the scoring in the first quarter via a 63-yard touchdown pass from Goff to D'Andre Swift. The Lions extended their lead via a 37-yard field goal by Austin Seibert. The Rams responded with a 33-yard field goal by Matt Gay. The Lions extended their lead in the second quarter via a 47-yard field goal by Seibert. The Rams responded with 14 points via an 11-yard touchdown pass from Matthew Stafford to Van Jefferson and a two-yard touchdown pass from Stafford to Cooper Kupp, giving the Rams their first lead of the game. The Lions responded with a 41-yard field goal by Seibert, making the score 17–16 in favor of Los Angeles at half-time. The Lions scored the only points of the third quarter via a 31-yard field goal by Seibert to regain the lead. In the fourth quarter, the Rams responded with a five-yard touchdown pass from Stafford to Kupp and a two-point conversion pass from Stafford to Robert Woods to regain the lead. The Lions' attempted comeback failed following an interception by Goff to Jalen Ramsey in the red zone. The Rams extended their lead via a 47-yard field goal by Gay, making the final score 28–19 in favor of Los Angeles.

==== Week 8: vs. Philadelphia Eagles ====
Week 8: Philadelphia Eagles at Detroit Lions – Game summary

Quarter	1	2	3	4	Total
**Eagles**	7	10	21	6	**44**
Lions	0	0	0	6	**6**

at Ford Field, Detroit, Michigan

- Date: October 31
- Game time: 1:00 p.m. EDT
- Game weather: None (indoor stadium)
- Game attendance: 47,192
- Referee: Tony Corrente
- TV announcers (Fox): Kenny Albert, Jonathan Vilma and Megan Olivi
- Recap, Game Book

Game information

**First quarter**

- PHI – Boston Scott 1-yard run (Jake Elliott kick), 3:11. Eagles 7–0. **Drive: 10 plays, 63 yards, 5:25.**

**Second quarter**

- PHI – Jake Elliott 43-yard field goal, 12:50. Eagles 10–0. **Drive: 7 plays, 36 yards, 3:13.**
- PHI – Jordan Howard 4-yard run (Jake Elliott kick), 2:51. Eagles 17–0. **Drive: 8 plays, 81 yards, 4:50.**

**Third quarter**

- PHI – Boston Scott 3-yard run (Jake Elliott kick), 9:02. Eagles 24–0. **Drive: 11 plays, 90 yards, 5:58.**
- PHI – Jordan Howard 2-yard run (Jake Elliott kick), 1:20. Eagles 31–0. **Drive: 9 plays, 57 yards, 4:40.**
- PHI – Darius Slay 33-yard fumble recovery (Jake Elliott kick), 1:09. Eagles 38–0.

**Fourth quarter**

- PHI – Jake Elliott 26-yard field goal, 9:53. Eagles 41–0. **Drive: 7 plays, 23 yards, 4:22.**
- DET – Jermar Jefferson 8-yard run (pass failed), 7:14. Eagles 41–6. **Drive: 11 plays, 67 yards, 2:39.**
- PHI – Jake Elliott 41-yard field goal, 1:49. Eagles 44–6. **Drive: 9 plays, 26 yards, 5:25.**

**Top passers**

- PHI – Jalen Hurts – 9/14, 103 yards
- DET – Jared Goff – 25/34, 222 yards

**Top rushers**

- PHI – Jalen Hurts – 7 rushes, 71 yards
- DET – D'Andre Swift – 12 rushes, 27 yards

**Top receivers**

- PHI – Dallas Goedert – 6 receptions, 72 yards
- DET – T. J. Hockenson – 10 receptions, 89 yards

In week 8, the Lions hosted the Philadelphia Eagles. The Eagles opened the scoring in the first quarter via a one-yard touchdown run from Boston Scott. The Eagles added 10 points in the second quarter via a 43-yard field goal by Jake Elliott and a four-yard touchdown run from Jordan Howard, making the score 17–0 in favor of Philadelphia at half-time. The Eagles added 21 points in the third quarter via a three-yard touchdown run from Scott, a two-yard touchdown run from Howard and a 33-yard fumble recovery by Darius Slay. The Eagles added six points in the fourth quarter via two field goals by Elliott from 26-yards, and 41-yards, respectively. The Lions finally got on the board via an eight-yard touchdown run from Jermar Jefferson, making the final score 44–6 in favor of Philadelphia. With the loss, the Lions went into their bye week with an 0–8 record.

==== Week 10: at Pittsburgh Steelers ====
Week 10: Detroit Lions at Pittsburgh Steelers – Game summary

Quarter	1	2	3	4	OT	Total
Lions	0	10	6	0	0	**16**
Steelers	7	3	3	3	0	**16**

at Heinz Field, Pittsburgh, Pennsylvania

- Date: November 14
- Game time: 1:00 p.m. EST
- Game weather: Cloudy, 39 °F (4 °C)
- Game attendance: 58,716
- Referee: Land Clark
- TV announcers (Fox): Chris Myers, Daryl Johnston and Jen Hale
- Recap, Game Book

Game information

**First quarter**

- PIT – James Washington 9-yard pass from Mason Rudolph (Chris Boswell kick), 9:40. Steelers 7–0. **Drive: 10 plays, 83 yards, 5:20.**

**Second quarter**

- DET – Jermar Jefferson 28-yard run (Ryan Santoso kick), 12:43. Tied 7–7. **Drive: 3 plays, 39 yards, 1:28.**
- PIT – Chris Boswell 20-yard field goal, 4:22. Steelers 10–7. **Drive: 13 plays, 73 yards, 8:21.**
- DET – Ryan Santoso 20-yard field goal, 0:00. Tied 10–10. **Drive: 12 plays, 67 yards, 4:22.**

**Third quarter**

- DET – Godwin Igwebuike 42-yard run (kick failed, wide right), 12:09. Lions 16–10. **Drive: 6 plays, 85 yards, 2:51.**
- PIT – Chris Boswell 23-yard field goal, 8:26. Lions 16–13. **Drive: 13 plays, 69 yards, 3:43.**

**Fourth quarter**

- PIT – Chris Boswell 51-yard field goal, 11:31. Tied 16–16. **Drive: 6 plays, 17 yards, 3:21.**

**Overtime**

- No scoring plays.

**Top passers**

- DET – Jared Goff – 14/25, 114 yards
- PIT – Mason Rudolph – 30/50, 242 yards, TD, INT

**Top rushers**

- DET – D'Andre Swift – 32 rushes, 130 yards
- PIT – Najee Harris – 26 rushes, 105 yards

**Top receivers**

- DET – Amon-Ra St. Brown – 4 receptions, 61 yards
- PIT – Diontae Johnson – 7 receptions, 83 yards

In week 10, the Lions visited the Pittsburgh Steelers. The Steelers opened the scoring in the first quarter via a nine-yard touchdown pass from Mason Rudolph to James Washington. In the second quarter the Lions responded with a 28-yard touchdown run from Jermar Jefferson to tie the game. The teams then exchanged field goals, first a 20-yard field goal by Chris Boswell for the Steelers, then a 20-yard field goal by Ryan Santoso for the Lions, making the score 10–10 at half-time. In the third quarter the Lions took their first lead of the game via a 42-yard touchdown run from Godwin Igwebuike and a missed extra point by Santoso. The Steelers responded with a 23-yard field goal by Boswell. The Steelers scored the only points of the fourth quarter via a 51-yard field goal by Boswell to tie the game and force overtime. After neither team scored in overtime, the game resulted in a 16–16 tie.

==== Week 11: at Cleveland Browns ====
Week 11: Detroit Lions at Cleveland Browns – Game summary

Quarter	1	2	3	4	Total
Lions	0	0	7	3	**10**
**Browns**	0	13	0	0	**13**

at FirstEnergy Stadium, Cleveland, Ohio

- Date: November 21
- Game time: 1:00 p.m. EST
- Game weather: Showers, 44 °F (7 °C)
- Game attendance: 67,431
- Referee: Clay Martin
- TV announcers (Fox): Gus Johnson, Lavar Arrington and Megan Olivi
- Recap, Game Book

Game information

**First quarter**

- No scoring plays.

**Second quarter**

- CLE – Jarvis Landry 16-yard run (Chase McLaughlin kick), 14:52. Browns 7–0. **Drive: 8 plays, 84 yards, 4:54.**
- CLE – Nick Chubb 5-yard pass from Baker Mayfield (kick blocked), 1:10. Browns 13–0. **Drive: 11 plays, 76 yards, 6:54.**

**Third quarter**

- DET – D'Andre Swift 57-yard run (Aldrick Rosas kick), 1:55. Browns 13–7. **Drive: 4 plays, 78 yards, 2:23.**

**Fourth quarter**

- DET – Aldrick Rosas 43-yard field goal, 9:07. Browns 13–10. **Drive: 4 plays, 9 yards, 1:54.**

**Top passers**

- DET – Tim Boyle – 15/23, 77 yards, 2 INT
- CLE – Baker Mayfield – 15/29, 176 yards, TD, 2 INT

**Top rushers**

- DET – D'Andre Swift – 14 rushes, 136 yards, TD
- CLE – Nick Chubb – 22 rushes, 130 yards

**Top receivers**

- DET – T. J. Hockenson – 6 receptions, 51 yards
- CLE – Austin Hooper – 4 receptions, 53 yards

In week 11 the Lions visited the Cleveland Browns. After a scoreless first quarter, the Browns scored 13 points in the second quarter via a 16-yard touchdown run from Jarvis Landry and a five-yard touchdown pass from Baker Mayfield to Nick Chubb, making the score 13–0 in favor of Cleveland at half-time. The Lions finally got on the board in the third quarter via a 57-yard touchdown run from D'Andre Swift. The Lions scored the only points of the fourth quarter via a 43-yard field goal by Aldrick Rosas, making the final score 13–10 in favor of Cleveland. The Lions lost their first game in Cleveland since 2001.

==== Week 12: vs. Chicago Bears ====
Week 12: Chicago Bears at Detroit Lions – Game summary

Quarter	1	2	3	4	Total
**Bears**	0	13	0	3	**16**
Lions	7	0	7	0	**14**

at Ford Field, Detroit, Michigan

- Date: November 25
- Game time: 12:30 p.m. EST
- Game weather: None (indoor stadium)
- Game attendance: 56,355
- Referee: Adrian Hill
- TV announcers (Fox): Joe Buck, Troy Aikman, Erin Andrews and Tom Rinaldi
- Recap, Game Book

Game information

**First quarter**

- DET – Josh Reynolds 39-yard pass from Jared Goff (Riley Patterson kick), 9:26. Lions 7–0. **Drive: 7 plays, 69 yards, 3:16.**

**Second quarter**

- CHI – Cairo Santos 28-yard field goal, 13:24. Lions 7–3. **Drive: 10 plays, 74 yards, 4:37.**
- CHI – Jimmy Graham 17-yard pass from Andy Dalton (Cairo Santos kick), 4:29. Bears 10–7. **Drive: 2 plays, 69 yards, 0:52.**
- CHI – Cairo Santos 43-yard field goal, 0:00. Bears 13–7. **Drive: 7 plays, 29 yards, 1:09.**

**Third quarter**

- DET – T. J. Hockenson 17-yard pass from Jared Goff (Riley Patterson kick), 1:46. Lions 14–13. **Drive: 7 plays, 79 yards, 3:21.**

**Fourth quarter**

- CHI – Cairo Santos 28-yard field goal, 0:00. Bears 16–14. **Drive: 18 plays, 69 yards, 8:30.**

**Top passers**

- CHI – Andy Dalton – 24/39, 317 yards, TD, INT
- DET – Jared Goff – 21/25, 171 yards, 2 TD

**Top rushers**

- CHI – David Montgomery – 17 rushes, 46 yards
- DET – Jamaal Williams – 15 rushes, 65 yards

**Top receivers**

- CHI – Darnell Mooney – 5 receptions, 123 yards
- DET – Josh Reynolds – 3 receptions, 70 yards, TD

For their annual Thanksgiving Day game, the Lions hosted a rematch against their divisional rival the Chicago Bears. The Lions unsuccessfully attempted to win their first game on Thanksgiving since 2016, as well as end their 14-game non-winning streak dating back to week 13 of the 2020 season, which was also against the Bears. The Lions opened the scoring in the first quarter via a 39-yard touchdown pass from Jared Goff to Josh Reynolds. The Bears scored 13 points in the second quarter via a 28-yard field goal by Cairo Santos, a 17-yard touchdown pass from Andy Dalton to Jimmy Graham, and a 43-yard field goal by Santos, which made the score 13–7 in favor of Chicago at half-time. The Lions scored the only points of the third quarter via a 17-yard touchdown pass from Goff to T. J. Hockenson to regain the lead. The Bears responded with a 28-yard field goal by Santos as time expired, making the final score 16–14 in favor of Chicago.

==== Week 13: vs. Minnesota Vikings ====
Week 13: Minnesota Vikings at Detroit Lions – Game summary

Quarter	1	2	3	4	Total
Vikings	6	0	9	12	**27**
**Lions**	0	20	3	6	**29**

at Ford Field, Detroit, Michigan

- Date: December 5
- Game time: 1:00 p.m. EST
- Game weather: None (indoor stadium)
- Game attendance: 45,691
- Referee: Craig Wrolstad
- TV announcers (CBS): Spero Dedes and Jay Feely
- Recap, Game Book

Game information

**First quarter**

- MIN – Greg Joseph 41-yard field goal, 6:49. Vikings 3–0. **Drive: 5 plays, 18 yards, 2:51.**
- MIN – Greg Joseph 31-yard field goal, 0:59. Vikings 6–0. **Drive: 10 plays, 53 yards, 4:11.**

**Second quarter**

- DET – T. J. Hockenson 9-yard pass from Jared Goff (Riley Patterson kick), 13:50. Lions 7–6. **Drive: 5 plays, 69 yards, 2:09.**
- DET – Brock Wright 23-yard pass from Jared Goff (Riley Patterson kick), 9:45. Lions 14–6. **Drive: 3 plays, 56 yards, 1:23.**
- DET – Riley Patterson 31-yard field goal, 1:33. Lions 17–6. **Drive: 13 plays, 77 yards, 5:33.**
- DET – Riley Patterson 41-yard field goal, 0:06. Lions 20–6. **Drive: 5 plays, 32 yards, 0:26.**

**Third quarter**

- MIN – Greg Joseph 31-yard field goal, 9:26. Lions 20–9. **Drive: 11 plays, 60 yards, 4:47.**
- MIN – Alexander Mattison 8-yard run (run failed), 6:13. Lions 20–15. **Drive: 5 plays, 67 yards, 1:36.**
- DET – Riley Patterson 49-yard field goal, 1:56. Lions 23–15. **Drive: 8 plays, 44 yards, 4:17.**

**Fourth quarter**

- MIN – K. J. Osborn 5-yard pass from Kirk Cousins (run failed), 11:57. Lions 23–21. **Drive: 10 plays, 75 yards, 4:59.**
- MIN – Justin Jefferson 3-yard pass from Kirk Cousins (pass failed), 1:50. Vikings 27–23. **Drive: 6 plays, 19 yards, 2:11.**
- DET – Amon-Ra St. Brown 11-yard pass from Jared Goff, 0:00. Lions 29–27. **Drive: 14 plays, 75 yards, 1:50.**

**Top passers**

- MIN – Kirk Cousins – 30/40, 340 yards, 2 TD
- DET – Jared Goff – 25/41, 296 yards, 3 TD, INT

**Top rushers**

- MIN – Alexander Mattison – 22 rushes, 90 yards, TD
- DET – Jamaal Williams – 17 rushes, 71 yards

**Top receivers**

- MIN – Justin Jefferson – 11 receptions, 182 yards, TD
- DET – Amon-Ra St. Brown – 10 receptions, 86 yards, TD

In week 13, the Lions hosted a rematch against their divisional rival the Minnesota Vikings. The Vikings scored six points in the first quarter via two field goals by Greg Joseph, from 41-yards, and 31-yards, respectively. The Lions scored 20 points in the second quarter via a nine-yard touchdown pass from Jared Goff to T. J. Hockenson, a 23-yard touchdown pass from Goff to Brock Wright, and two field goals by Riley Patterson, from 31-yards, and 41-yards, respectively, making the score 20–6 in favor of Detroit at half-time. The Vikings scored nine points in the third quarter via a 31-yard field goal by Joseph, and an eight-yard touchdown run from Alexander Mattison. The Lions extended their lead via a 49-yard field goal by Patterson. The Vikings regained the lead in the fourth quarter after they scored 12 points via a five-yard touchdown pass from Kirk Cousins to K. J. Osborn, and a three-yard touchdown pass from Cousins to Justin Jefferson. The Lions responded with a game-winning drive down the field, and an 11-yard touchdown pass from Goff to Amon-Ra St. Brown as time expired, making the final score 29–27 in favor of Detroit, ending the Lions' 15 game winless streak, their last win being 364 days before. The Lions dedicated the win to the four victims who were killed in the 2021 Oxford High School shooting.

==== Week 14: at Denver Broncos ====
Week 14: Detroit Lions at Denver Broncos – Game summary

Quarter	1	2	3	4	Total
Lions	0	10	0	0	**10**
**Broncos**	14	3	14	7	**38**

at Empower Field at Mile High, Denver, Colorado

- Date: December 12
- Game time: 4:05 p.m. EST/2:05 p.m. MST
- Game weather: Partly cloudy, 61 °F (16 °C)
- Game attendance: 76,211
- Referee: John Hussey
- TV announcers (Fox): Kevin Kugler, Mark Sanchez and Laura Okmin
- Recap, Game Book

Game information

**First quarter**

- DEN – Javonte Williams 5-yard run (Brandon McManus kick), 9:46. Broncos 7–0. **Drive: 11 plays, 75 yards, 5:14.**
- DEN – Melvin Gordon 1-yard run (Brandon McManus kick), 0:53. Broncos 14–0. **Drive: 12 plays, 74 yards, 7:16.**

**Second quarter**

- DET – Kalif Raymond 7-yard pass from Jared Goff (Riley Patterson kick), 12:31. Broncos 14–7. **Drive: 7 plays, 75 yards, 3:22.**
- DET – Riley Patterson 36-yard field goal, 6:34. Broncos 14–10. **Drive: 11 plays, 57 yards, 5:10.**
- DEN – Brandon McManus 52-yard field goal, 0:00. Broncos 17–10. **Drive: 9 plays, 44 yards, 1:05.**

**Third quarter**

- DEN – Javonte Williams 10-yard pass from Teddy Bridgewater (Brandon McManus kick), 11:03. Broncos 24–10. **Drive: 5 plays, 36 yards, 3:08.**
- DEN – Melvin Gordon 14-yard run (Brandon McManus kick), 6:34. Broncos 31–10. **Drive: 4 plays, 33 yards, 2:13.**

**Fourth quarter**

- DEN – Albert Okwuegbunam 4-yard pass from Teddy Bridgewater (Brandon McManus kick), 1:51. Broncos 38–10. **Drive: 14 plays, 88 yards, 7:08.**

**Top passers**

- DET – Jared Goff – 24/39, 215 yards, TD, INT
- DEN – Teddy Bridgewater – 18/25, 179 yards, 2 TD

**Top rushers**

- DET – Craig Reynolds – 11 rushes, 83 yards
- DEN – Melvin Gordon – 24 rushes, 111 yards, 2 TD

**Top receivers**

- DET – Amon-Ra St. Brown – 8 receptions, 73 yards
- DEN – Noah Fant – 4 receptions, 51 yards

In week 14, the Lions visited the Denver Broncos. The Broncos scored 14 points in the first quarter via a five-yard touchdown run from Javonte Williams and a one-yard touchdown run from Melvin Gordon. The Lions scored 10 points in the second quarter via a seven-yard touchdown pass from Jared Goff to Kalif Raymond and a 36-yard field goal by Riley Patterson. The Broncos responded with a 52-yard field goal by Brandon McManus, which made the score 17–10 in favor of Denver at half-time. The Lions were held scoreless in the second half. The Broncos scored 14 points in the third quarter via a 10-yard touchdown pass from Teddy Bridgewater to Williams and a 14-yard touchdown run from Gordon. The Broncos scored the only points of the fourth quarter via a four-yard touchdown pass from Bridgewater to Albert Okwuegbunam, making the final score 38–10 in favor of Denver. With the loss, the Lions were mathematically eliminated from playoff contention for the fifth straight year.

==== Week 15: vs. Arizona Cardinals ====
Week 15: Arizona Cardinals at Detroit Lions – Game summary

Quarter	1	2	3	4	Total
Cardinals	0	0	6	6	**12**
**Lions**	3	14	7	6	**30**

at Ford Field, Detroit, Michigan

- Date: December 19
- Game time: 1:00 p.m. EST
- Game weather: None (indoor stadium)
- Game attendance: 45,211
- Referee: Land Clark
- TV announcers (Fox): Gus Johnson, Aqib Talib and Megan Olivi
- Recap, Game Book

Game information

**First quarter**

- DET – Riley Patterson 37-yard field goal, 6:10. Lions 3–0. **Drive: 15 plays, 63 yards, 8:50.**

**Second quarter**

- DET – Amon-Ra St. Brown 37-yard pass from Jared Goff (Riley Patterson kick), 14:53. Lions 10–0. **Drive: 8 plays, 93 yards, 3:49.**
- DET – Josh Reynolds 22-yard pass from Jared Goff (Riley Patterson kick), 0:19. Lions 17–0. **Drive: 9 plays, 97 yards, 1:40.**

**Third quarter**

- ARI – Matt Prater 29-yard field goal, 11:22. Lions 17–3. **Drive: 9 plays, 64 yards, 3:38.**
- DET – Jason Cabinda 6-yard pass from Jared Goff (Riley Patterson kick), 8:10. Lions 24–3. **Drive: 1 play, 6 yards, 0:05.**
- ARI – Matt Prater 29-yard field goal, 3:54. Lions 24–6. **Drive: 11 plays, 72 yards, 4:16.**

**Fourth quarter**

- DET – Riley Patterson 47-yard field goal, 13:15. Lions 27–6. **Drive: 10 plays, 46 yards, 5:39.**
- ARI – Christian Kirk 26-yard pass from Kyler Murray (pass failed), 4:40. Lions 27–12. **Drive: 12 plays, 87 yards, 3:08.**
- DET – Riley Patterson 45-yard field goal, 2:46. Lions 30–12. **Drive: 6 plays, 19 yards, 1:54.**

**Top passers**

- ARI – Kyler Murray – 23/41, 257 yards, TD, INT
- DET – Jared Goff – 21/26, 216 yards, 3 TD

**Top rushers**

- ARI – Chase Edmonds – 6 rushes, 53 yards
- DET – Craig Reynolds – 26 rushes, 112 yards

**Top receivers**

- ARI – Christian Kirk – 9 receptions, 94 yards, TD
- DET – Amon-Ra St. Brown – 8 receptions, 90 yards, TD

In week 15, the Lions hosted the Arizona Cardinals. The Lions opened the scoring in the first quarter via a 37-yard field goal by Riley Patterson. The Lions scored 14 points in the second quarter via a 37-yard touchdown pass from Jared Goff to Amon-Ra St. Brown and a 22-yard touchdown pass from Goff to Josh Reynolds, which made the score 17–0 in favor of Detroit at half-time. The Cardinals finally got on the board in the third quarter via a 29-yard field goal by Matt Prater. The Lions extended their lead via a six-yard touchdown pass from Goff to Jason Cabinda. The Cardinals responded with a 29-yard field goal by Prater. The Lions extended their lead in the fourth quarter via a 47-yard field goal by Patterson. The Cardinals responded with a 26-yard touchdown pass from Kyler Murray to Christian Kirk. The Lions scored the final points of the game via a 45-yard field goal by Patterson, making the final score 30–12 in favor of Detroit.

==== Week 16: at Atlanta Falcons ====
Week 16: Detroit Lions at Atlanta Falcons – Game summary

Quarter	1	2	3	4	Total
Lions	3	7	3	3	**16**
**Falcons**	0	10	3	7	**20**

at Mercedes-Benz Stadium, Atlanta, Georgia

- Date: December 26
- Game time: 1:00 p.m. EST
- Game weather: Partly cloudy, 70 °F (21 °C) (retractable roof open)
- Game attendance: 68,638
- Referee: Ronald Torbert
- TV announcers (Fox): Chris Myers, Robert Smith and Jen Hale
- Recap, Game Book

Game information

**First quarter**

- DET – Riley Patterson 26-yard field goal, 3:25. Lions 3–0. **Drive: 13 plays, 54 yards, 7:34.**

**Second quarter**

- ATL – Cordarrelle Patterson 6-yard run (Younghoe Koo kick), 10:53. Falcons 7–3. **Drive: 9 plays, 54 yards, 4:24.**
- DET – Amon-Ra St. Brown 20-yard pass from Tim Boyle (Riley Patterson kick), 3:44. Lions 10–7. **Drive: 11 plays, 75 yards, 7:09.**
- ATL – Younghoe Koo 53-yard field goal, 1:04. Tied 10–10. **Drive: 7 plays, 43 yards, 2:40.**

**Third quarter**

- ATL – Younghoe Koo 48-yard field goal, 10:11. Falcons 13–10. **Drive: 8 plays, 59 yards, 3:19.**
- DET – Riley Patterson 37-yard field goal, 3:06. Tied 13–13. **Drive: 12 plays, 56 yards, 7:05.**

**Fourth quarter**

- ATL – Hayden Hurst 12-yard pass from Matt Ryan (Younghoe Koo kick), 13:04. Falcons 20–13. **Drive: 10 plays, 71 yards, 5:02.**
- DET – Riley Patterson 26-yard field goal, 2:38. Falcons 20–16. **Drive: 17 plays, 66 yards, 10:26.**

**Top passers**

- DET – Tim Boyle – 24/34, 187 yards, TD, INT
- ATL – Matt Ryan – 18/24, 215 yards, TD

**Top rushers**

- DET – Jamaal Williams – 19 rushes, 77 yards
- ATL – Mike Davis – 7 rushes, 28 yards

**Top receivers**

- DET – Amon-Ra St. Brown – 9 receptions, 91 yards, TD
- ATL – Kyle Pitts – 6 receptions, 102 yards

In week 16, the Lions visited the Atlanta Falcons. The Lions opened the scoring in the first quarter via a 26-yard field goal by Riley Patterson. The teams exchanged touchdowns in the second quarter, first a six-yard touchdown run from Cordarrelle Patterson for the Falcons, then a 20-yard touchdown pass from Tim Boyle to Amon-Ra St. Brown for the Lions. The Falcons scored the final points of the half via a 53-yard field goal by Younghoe Koo, tying the score at 10–10 at half-time. The teams exchanged field goals in the third quarter, first a 48-yard field goal by Koo for the Falcons, then a 37-yard field goal by Patterson for the Lions. The Falcons took their first lead of the game in the fourth quarter via a 12-yard touchdown pass from Matt Ryan to Hayden Hurst. The Lions responded with a 26-yard field goal by Patterson, making the final score 20–16 in favor of Atlanta.

==== Week 17: at Seattle Seahawks ====
Week 17: Detroit Lions at Seattle Seahawks – Game summary

Quarter	1	2	3	4	Total
Lions	0	7	15	7	**29**
**Seahawks**	10	21	7	13	**51**

at Lumen Field, Seattle, Washington

- Date: January 2
- Game time: 4:25 p.m. EST/1:25 p.m. PST
- Game weather: Rain, 39 °F (4 °C)
- Game attendance: 68,043
- Referee: Tony Corrente
- TV announcers (Fox): Gus Johnson, Aqib Talib and Megan Olivi
- Recap, Game Book

Game information

**First quarter**

- SEA – Rashaad Penny 15-yard run (Jason Myers kick), 5:46. Seahawks 7–0. **Drive: 9 plays, 71 yards, 3:56.**
- SEA – Jason Myers 51-yard field goal, 1:00. Seahawks 10–0. **Drive: 7 plays, 41 yards, 3:09.**

**Second quarter**

- SEA – Rashaad Penny 6-yard run (Jason Myers kick), 14:07. Seahawks 17–0. **Drive: 2 plays, 64 yards, 0:42.**
- DET – Amon-Ra St. Brown 26-yard run (Riley Patterson kick), 11:08. Seahawks 17–7. **Drive: 5 plays, 45 yards, 2:59.**
- SEA – DK Metcalf 13-yard pass from Russell Wilson (Jason Myers kick), 5:59. Seahawks 24–7. **Drive: 11 plays, 69 yards, 5:09.**
- SEA – Tyler Lockett 1-yard pass from Russell Wilson (Jason Myers kick), 0:21. Seahawks 31–7. **Drive: 11 plays, 90 yards, 5:13.**

**Third quarter**

- SEA – DK Metcalf 13-yard pass from Russell Wilson (Jason Myers kick), 14:12. Seahawks 38–7. **Drive: 2 plays, 21 yards, 0:40.**
- DET – Amon-Ra St. Brown 7-yard pass from Tim Boyle (Tim Boyle–Amon-Ra St. Brown pass), 10:14. Seahawks 38–15. **Drive: 8 plays, 73 yards, 3:58.**
- DET – Taylor Decker 6-yard pass from Tim Boyle (Riley Patterson kick), 4:50. Seahawks 38–22. **Drive: 10 plays, 56 yards, 5:24.**

**Fourth quarter**

- SEA – DK Metcalf 1-yard pass from Russell Wilson (Jason Myers kick), 12:36. Seahawks 45–22. **Drive: 13 plays, 75 yards, 7:14.**
- DET – Jamaal Williams 1-yard run (Riley Patterson kick), 7:04. Seahawks 45–29. **Drive: 11 plays, 75 yards, 5:32.**
- SEA – Jason Myers 36-yard field goal, 5:29. Seahawks 48–29. **Drive: 5 plays, 22 yards, 1:35.**
- SEA – Jason Myers 42-yard field goal, 4:33. Seahawks 51–29. **Drive: 4 plays, −2 yards, 0:24.**

**Top passers**

- DET – Tim Boyle – 22/37, 262 yards, 2 TD, 3 INT
- SEA – Russell Wilson – 20/29, 236 yards, 4 TD

**Top rushers**

- DET – D'Andre Swift – 4 rushes, 32 yards
- SEA – Rashaad Penny – 26 rushes, 170 yards, 2 TD

**Top receivers**

- DET – Amon-Ra St. Brown – 8 receptions, 111 yards, TD
- SEA – Freddie Swain – 2 receptions, 66 yards

In week 17, the Lions visited the Seattle Seahawks. The Seahawks scored ten points in the first quarter via a 15-yard touchdown run from Rashaad Penny and a 51-yard field goal by Jason Myers. The Lions finally got on the board in the second quarter via a 26-yard touchdown run from Amon-Ra St. Brown. The Seahawks scored 21 points in the quarter via a six-yard touchdown run from Penny, a 13-yard touchdown pass from Russell Wilson to DK Metcalf and a one-yard touchdown pass from Wilson to Tyler Lockett, which made the score 31–7 in favor of Seattle at half-time. The Seahawks extended their lead in the third quarter via a 13-yard touchdown pass from Wilson to Metcalf. The Lions responded with 15 points via a one-yard touchdown run from Jamaal Williams and two-point conversion pass from Tim Boyle to St. Brown, and a six-yard touchdown pass from Boyle to Taylor Decker. The teams exchanged touchdowns in the fourth quarter, first a one-yard touchdown pass from Wilson to Metcalf for the Seahawks, then a one-yard touchdown run from Williams for the Lions. The Seahawks extended their lead via two field goals by Myers from 36-yards, and 42-yards, respectively, making the final score 51–29 in favor of Seattle. The loss also meant the Lions finished last in the NFC for the fourth consecutive year.

==== Week 18: vs. Green Bay Packers ====
Week 18: Green Bay Packers at Detroit Lions – Game summary

Quarter	1	2	3	4	Total
Packers	7	6	3	14	**30**
**Lions**	7	10	7	13	**37**

at Ford Field, Detroit, Michigan

- Date: January 9
- Game time: 1:00 p.m. EST
- Game weather: None (indoor stadium)
- Game attendance: 56,735
- Referee: Scott Novak
- TV announcers (Fox): Kevin Burkhardt, Greg Olsen and Pam Oliver
- Recap, Game Book

Game information

**First quarter**

- GB – Allen Lazard 1-yard pass from Aaron Rodgers (Mason Crosby kick), 7:42. Packers 7–0. **Drive: 13 plays, 74 yards, 7:18.**
- DET – Kalif Raymond 75-yard pass from Tom Kennedy (Riley Patterson kick), 1:29. Tied 7–7. **Drive: 3 plays, 93 yards, 1:28.**

**Second quarter**

- DET – Amon-Ra St. Brown 2-yard pass from Jared Goff (Riley Patterson kick), 7:00. Lions 14–7. **Drive: 10 plays, 57 yards, 5:44.**
- GB – Allen Lazard 29-yard pass from Aaron Rodgers (kick failed), 2:34. Lions 14–13. **Drive: 7 plays, 75 yards, 4:26.**
- DET – Riley Patterson 34-yard field goal, 0:02. Lions 17–13. **Drive: 10 plays, 59 yards, 2:32.**

**Third quarter**

- DET – Brock Wright 36-yard pass from Jared Goff (Riley Patterson kick), 12:50. Lions 24–13. **Drive: 1 play, 36 yards, 0:09.**
- GB – Mason Crosby 36-yard field goal, 7:38. Lions 24–16. **Drive: 11 plays, 58 yards, 5:12.**

**Fourth quarter**

- GB – Patrick Taylor 1-yard run (pass failed), 14:12. Lions 24–22. **Drive: 12 plays, 57 yards, 6:53.**
- DET – Riley Patterson 36-yard field goal, 6:39. Lions 27–22. **Drive: 14 plays, 57 yards, 7:33.**
- GB – Josiah Deguara 62-yard pass from Jordan Love (Jordan Love run), 4:49. Packers 30–27. **Drive: 4 plays, 75 yards, 1:50.**
- DET – D'Andre Swift 14-yard run (Riley Patterson kick), 1:54. Lions 34–30. **Drive: 6 plays, 75 yards, 2:55.**
- DET – Riley Patterson 27-yard field goal, 0:48. Lions 37–30. **Drive: 4 plays, 6 yards, 0:25.**

**Top passers**

- GB – Aaron Rodgers – 14/18, 138 yards, 2 TD
- DET – Jared Goff – 21/30, 238 yards, 2 TD

**Top rushers**

- GB – A. J. Dillon – 14 rushes, 63 yards
- DET – Jamaal Williams – 13 rushes, 43 yards

**Top receivers**

- GB – Allen Lazard – 5 receptions, 75 yards, 2 TD
- DET – Amon-Ra St. Brown – 8 receptions, 109 yards, TD

To finish their season, the Lions hosted a rematch with their divisional rival, the Green Bay Packers. The teams exchanged touchdowns in the first quarter, first a one-yard touchdown pass from Aaron Rodgers to Allen Lazard for the Packers, then a 75-yard touchdown pass from Tom Kennedy to Kalif Raymond for the Lions. The Lions took their first lead of the game in the second quarter via a two-yard touchdown pass from Jared Goff to Amon-Ra St. Brown. The Packers responded with a 29-yard touchdown pass from Rodgers to Lazard, and a missed extra point by Mason Crosby. The Lions scored the final points of the half via a 34-yard field goal by Riley Patterson, which made the score 17–13 in favor of Detroit at half-time. The Lions extended their lead in the third quarter via a 36-yard touchdown pass from Goff to Brock Wright. The Packers responded with a 36-yard field goal by Crosby. The Packers scored 14 points in the fourth quarter via a one-yard touchdown run from Patrick Taylor and a failed two-point conversion attempt, then a 62-yard touchdown pass from Jordan Love to Josiah Deguara and a two-point conversion run from Love to regain the lead for the first time since the first quarter. The Lions scored 13 points in the quarter via a 36-yard field goal by Patterson, a 14-yard touchdown run from D'Andre Swift and a 27-yard field goal by Patterson, making the final score 37–30 in favor of Detroit.

=== Standings ===
==== Division ====
NFC North
	W	L	T	PCT	DIV	CONF	PF	PA	STK
^{(1)} Green Bay Packers	13	4	0	.765	4–2	9–3	450	371	L1
Minnesota Vikings	8	9	0	.471	4–2	6–6	425	426	W1
Chicago Bears	6	11	0	.353	2–4	4–8	311	407	L1
Detroit Lions	3	13	1	.206	2–4	3–9	325	467	W1

==== Conference ====
NFC
#	Team	Division	W	L	T	PCT	DIV	CONF	SOS	SOV	STK
**Division winners**
1 (Note: Green Bay finished ahead of Tampa Bay based on conference record (9–3 vs. 8–4), claiming the No. 1 seed.)	Green Bay Packers	North	13	4	0	.765	4–2	9–3	.479	.480	L1
2	Tampa Bay Buccaneers	South	13	4	0	.765	4–2	8–4	.467	.443	W3
3 (Note: Dallas claimed the No. 3 seed over LA Rams based on conference record (10–2 vs. 8–4).)	Dallas Cowboys	East	12	5	0	.706	6–0	10–2	.488	.431	W1
4	Los Angeles Rams	West	12	5	0	.706	3–3	8–4	.483	.409	L1
**Wild cards**
5	Arizona Cardinals	West	11	6	0	.647	4–2	7–5	.490	.492	L1
6	San Francisco 49ers	West	10	7	0	.588	2–4	7–5	.500	.438	W2
7 (Note: Philadelphia finished ahead of New Orleans based on head-to-head victory, claiming the 7th and final playoff spot.)	Philadelphia Eagles	East	9	8	0	.529	3–3	7–5	.469	.350	L1
**Did not qualify for the postseason**
8	New Orleans Saints	South	9	8	0	.529	4–2	7–5	.512	.516	W2
9	Minnesota Vikings	North	8	9	0	.471	4–2	6–6	.507	.434	W1
10 (Note: Washington finished ahead of Atlanta and Seattle based on head-to-head victories.)	Washington Football Team	East	7	10	0	.412	2–4	6–6	.529	.420	W1
11 (Note: Seattle finished ahead of Atlanta based on win percentage in common games (4–2 vs. 3–3 against: San Francisco, New Orleans, Jacksonville, Washington, and Detroit).)	Seattle Seahawks	West	7	10	0	.412	3–3	4–8	.519	.424	W2
12	Atlanta Falcons	South	7	10	0	.412	2–4	4–8	.472	.315	L2
13	Chicago Bears	North	6	11	0	.353	2–4	4–8	.524	.373	L1
14	Carolina Panthers	South	5	12	0	.294	2–4	3–9	.509	.412	L7
15	New York Giants	East	4	13	0	.235	1–5	3–9	.536	.485	L6
16	Detroit Lions	North	3	13	1	.206	2–4	3–9	.528	.627	W1
**Tiebreakers** (Note: When breaking ties for three or more teams under the NFL's rules, they are first broken within divisions, then comparing only the highest-ranked remaining team from each division.)
