= Tim Boyle (American football) =

American football player (born 1994)

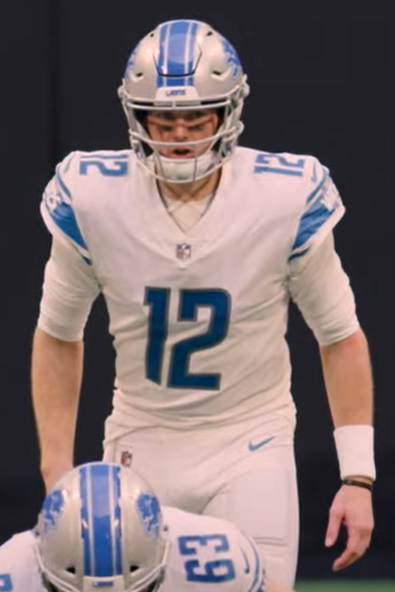
- Boyle with the Detroit Lions in 2021

Profile
- Position: Quarterback

Personal information
- Born: October 3, 1994 (age 32); Hartford, Connecticut, U.S.
- Listed height: 6 ft 4 in (1.93 m)
- Listed weight: 232 lb (105 kg)

Career information
- High school: Xavier (Middletown, Connecticut)
- College: UConn (2013–2015); Eastern Kentucky (2016–2017)
- NFL draft: 2018: undrafted

Career history
- Green Bay Packers (2018–2020); Detroit Lions (2021–2022); Chicago Bears (2022); New York Jets (2023); Houston Texans (2023)*; Miami Dolphins (2024); New York Giants (2024); Tennessee Titans (2025)*
- * Offseason or practice squad member only

Career NFL statistics
- Passing attempts: 233
- Passing completions: 141
- Completion percentage: 60.5%
- TD–INT: 5–13
- Passing yards: 1,210
- Passer rating: 58.1
- Stats at Pro Football Reference

Timothy Kevin Boyle (born October 3, 1994) is an American professional football player who was a quarterback in the National Football League (NFL). He played college football for the UConn Huskies and Eastern Kentucky Colonels and signed with the Green Bay Packers as an undrafted free agent in 2018. Boyle has also played for the Detroit Lions, Chicago Bears, New York Jets, Miami Dolphins, and New York Giants.

== Early life ==
Boyle grew up in Middlefield, Connecticut, and attended Xavier High School in Middletown, Connecticut, where he won three championships under head coach Sean Marinan. A 3-star recruit, Boyle was the top-ranked quarterback in Connecticut his senior year, and accepted a scholarship offer from home state Connecticut over offers from Boston College, Delaware, Harvard, Houston, Maine, Massachusetts, Syracuse, and Western Michigan, as well as preferred walk-ons from Notre Dame, Oregon, Pittsburgh, and Rutgers.

== College career ==
While playing for the UConn Huskies, Boyle started eight games and then transferred to Eastern Kentucky, where he started all eleven games as a redshirt senior and finished first in passing yards in the Ohio Valley Conference.

== Professional career ==
Pre-draft measurables
Height	Weight	Arm length	Hand span	40-yard dash	10-yard split	20-yard split	20-yard shuttle	Three-cone drill	Vertical jump	Broad jump	Bench press
6 ft 3 1/2 in (1.92 m)	232 lb (105 kg)	33 in (0.84 m)	9 5/8 in (0.24 m)	4.77 s	1.72 s	2.65 s	4.49 s	7.04 s	35.5 in (0.90 m)	9 ft 9 in (2.97 m)	16 reps
All values from Pro Day

=== Green Bay Packers ===
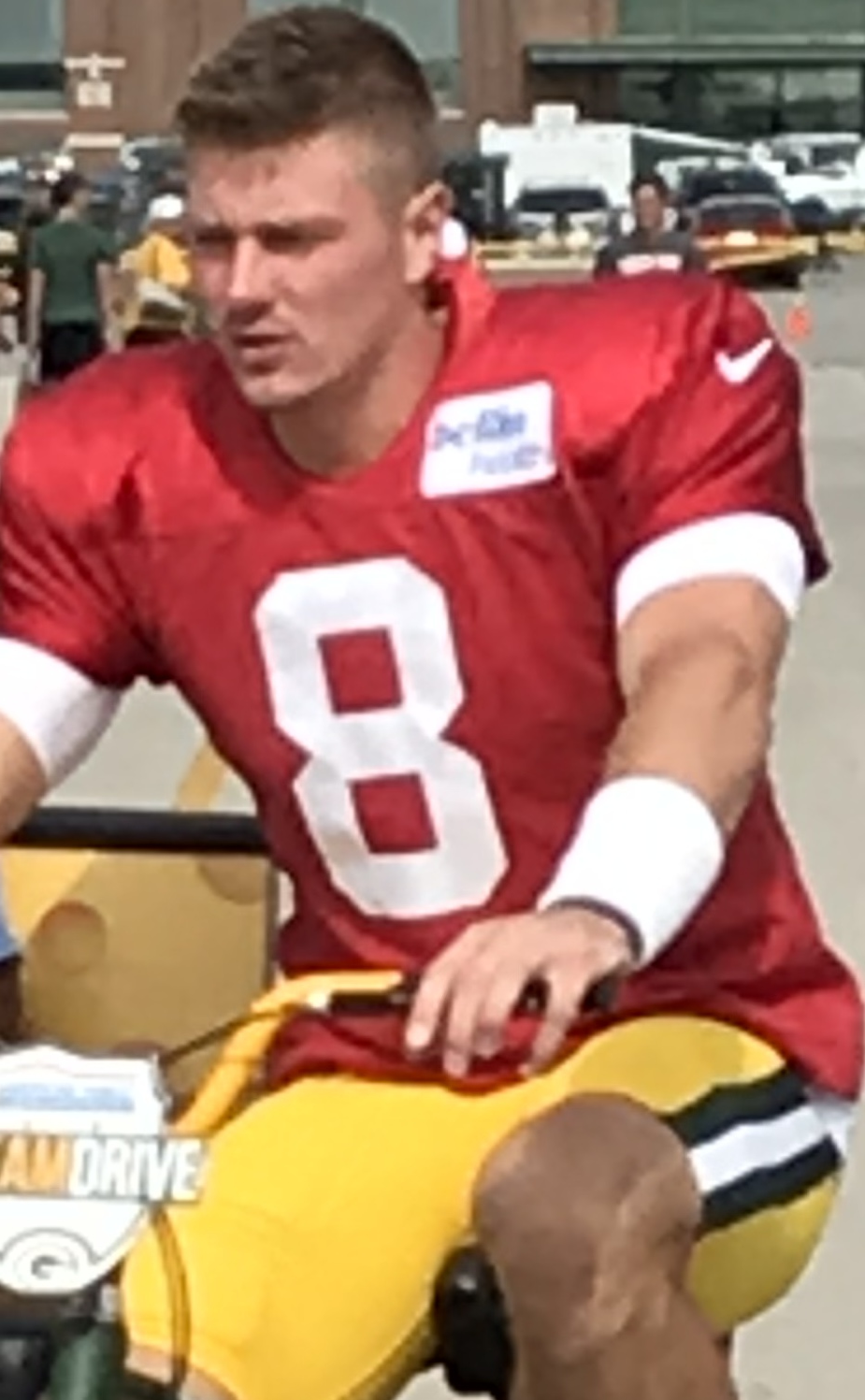
Boyle in 2019

Boyle signed with the Green Bay Packers as an undrafted free agent on May 4, 2018. After an impressive preseason, Boyle made the 53-man roster in September 2018, as the team's third-string quarterback behind Aaron Rodgers and DeShone Kizer.

Boyle did not play during the 2018 regular season. He saw his first professional playing time in a regular season on October 20, 2019, during a Week 7 win over the Oakland Raiders. Boyle took over for Rodgers during the final minutes of the game after victory was assured, kneeling the ball three times for −3 yards to run out the clock. He saw more extended playing time on November 24 during a lopsided loss to the San Francisco 49ers, completing his first NFL pass to backup tight end Robert Tonyan. Boyle finished the game with 3-of-4 pass attempts for 15 yards.

Boyle was scheduled to become a restricted free agent following the 2020 season, but the team did not extend a tender to him at the start of the new league year. He became an unrestricted free agent on March 17, 2021.

=== Detroit Lions ===
On March 22, 2021, Boyle signed a one-year contract with the Detroit Lions. He was placed on injured reserve on September 2, and activated on November 20, making his first career start in Week 11 in place of an injured Jared Goff. He completed 15-of-23 pass attempts for 77 yards, as well as two interceptions, in a 13–10 loss to the Cleveland Browns. He made his second career start in a Week 16 game against the Atlanta Falcons with Goff sidelined due to COVID-19, completing 24-of-34 pass attempts for 187 yards and a touchdown, but also threw a loss-sealing interception with less than a minute to play on goal-to-go, losing 20–16. In Week 17, against the Seattle Seahawks, he passed for 262 yards, throwing two touchdowns and three interceptions in the 51–29 loss.

On March 14, 2022, Boyle signed a one-year contract extension with the Lions. He was released on August 30 and re-signed to the practice squad.

=== Chicago Bears ===
On November 30, 2022, Boyle was signed by the Chicago Bears off the Lions' practice squad. He entered in the final game of the season against the Minnesota Vikings, relieving starter Nathan Peterman for two drives in the first half and again in the final minutes of the game; Boyle completed 2-of-8 passes for 33 yards with two interceptions in the 29–13 loss.

=== New York Jets ===
On April 6, 2023, Boyle signed with the New York Jets. He was released on August 29 and then re-signed to the practice squad. He was promoted to the active roster on September 16. On November 19, Boyle replaced Zach Wilson late in the third quarter and completed 7-of-14 pass attempts for 33 yards and an interception in a 32–6 loss to the Buffalo Bills. The next day, the Jets announced that Boyle would start in their Week 12 match against the Miami Dolphins. In a 34–13 defeat, he completed 27-of-38 pass attempts for 179 yards, throwing 1 touchdown and 2 interceptions (1 of which was returned for a 99-yard touchdown by Jevon Holland.) Boyle started again in the Jets' Week 13 game against the Atlanta Falcons, but was benched in the fourth quarter in favor of Trevor Siemian as the Jets lost 13–8. After going 0–2 in his starts, the Jets released Boyle on December 5.

=== Houston Texans ===
On December 19, 2023, Boyle was signed to the Houston Texans' practice squad. He signed a reserve/future contract on January 22, 2024, and released on August 27.

=== Miami Dolphins ===
On August 29, 2024, Boyle was signed to the Miami Dolphins' practice squad. He was promoted to the active roster on September 21 after starter Tua Tagovailoa went on injured reserve. Boyle appeared in the Dolphins' Week 3 game against the Seahawks after Skylar Thompson left in the second half with a rib injury. Boyle was later released on October 4 and re-signed to the practice squad the following day.

He was promoted to the active roster on October 19. Boyle made an appearance in the Week 7 game against the Indianapolis Colts, replacing Tyler Huntley in the third quarter, who left the game due to a shoulder injury. He was released again on October 26.

=== New York Giants ===
On November 19, 2024, Boyle was signed to the New York Giants' practice squad, and promoted to the active roster four days later.

=== Tennessee Titans ===
On March 26, 2025, Boyle signed with the Tennessee Titans. He was waived by Tennessee on August 11 following a poor pre-season performance against the Tampa Bay Buccaneers.

== Career statistics ==
=== NFL ===
Year	Team	Games			Passing									Rushing					Sacks		Fumbles	
Year	Team	GP	GS	Record	Cmp	Att	Pct	Yds	Y/A	Lng	TD	Int	Rtg	Att	Yds	Avg	Lng	TD	Sck	SckY	Fum	Lost
2018	GB	0	0	—	DNP																	
2019	GB	3	0	—	3	4	75.0	15	3.8	7	0	0	80.2	5	−7	−1.4	0	0	0	0	0	0
2020	GB	8	0	—	0	0	0.0	0	0.0	0	0	0	0.0	13	−9	−0.7	0	0	1	11	1	0
2021	DET	5	3	0–3	61	94	64.9	526	5.6	42	3	6	63.5	2	13	6.5	14	0	0	0	1	0
2022	CHI	1	0	—	2	8	25.0	33	4.1	17	0	2	4.7	2	−2	−1.0	−1	0	0	0	0	0
2023	NYJ	3	2	0–2	48	77	62.3	360	4.7	36	1	4	56.2	4	5	1.3	2	0	9	64	2	0
2024	MIA	2	0	—	15	26	57.7	153	5.9	30	0	0	74.7	2	10	5.0	6	0	1	9	0	0
2024	NYG	1	0	—	12	24	50.0	123	5.1	25	1	1	61.6	1	−1	−1.0	−1	0	1	2	0	0
Career		23	5	0–5	141	233	60.5	1,210	5.2	42	5	13	58.1	29	9	0.3	14	0	12	86	4	0

=== College ===
Season	Team	Games			Passing									Rushing				
Season	Team	GP	GS	Record	Comp	Att	Pct	Yards	Avg	Lng	TD	Int	Rate	Att	Yards	Avg	Lng	TD
2013	UConn	5	4	0–4	59	133	44.4	621	4.7	36	0	8	71.6	27	−73	−2.7	19	0
2014	UConn	9	3	0–3	43	82	52.4	335	4.1	39	1	3	83.5	16	−42	−2.6	4	0
2015	UConn	11	1	0–1	31	60	51.7	281	4.7	25	0	2	84.3	6	−7	−1.2	4	0
2016	Eastern Kentucky	0	DNP															
2017	Eastern Kentucky	11	11	4–7	201	327	61.5	2,134	6.5	50	11	13	119.4	19	−40	−2.1	7	1
Totals		36	19	4–15	334	602	55.5	3,371	5.6	50	12	26	100.5	68	−162	−2.4	19	1

== Post-playing career ==
A 2026 story by The Bristol Press noted Boyle was "now transitioning to life after the NFL". In June, he created the Boyle Family Foundation to promote youth sports programs.
