= Jermar Jefferson =

American football player (born 2000)

Profile
- Position: Running back

Personal information
- Born: April 15, 2000 (age 26); Los Angeles, California, U.S.
- Listed height: 5 ft 10 in (1.78 m)
- Listed weight: 215 lb (98 kg)

Career information
- High school: Narbonne (Harbor City, California)
- College: Oregon State (2018–2020)
- NFL draft: 2021: 7th round, 257th overall pick

Career history
- Detroit Lions (2021–2024); Tennessee Titans (2025)*; Arizona Cardinals (2025); San Francisco 49ers (2026)*; Minnesota Vikings (2026)*; Arizona Cardinals (2026)*
- * Offseason or practice squad member only

Awards and highlights
- Pac-12 Offensive Freshman of the Year (2018); First-team All-Pac-12 (2020)

Career NFL statistics as of 2025
- Rushing attempts: 21
- Rushing yards: 96
- Rushing touchdowns: 2
- Receptions: 5
- Receiving yards: 33
- Stats at Pro Football Reference

Jermar Jefferson (born April 15, 2000) is an American professional football running back. He played college football for the Oregon State Beavers and was selected by the Detroit Lions in the seventh round of the 2021 NFL draft.

== Early life ==
Jefferson initially attended high school at Redondo Union High School in Redondo Beach, California, before transferring to Narbonne High School in Harbor City, California in his senior year. Jefferson received an offer from and committed to Oregon State University in his senior year, while also receiving an offer to play football at the University of Southern California. Jefferson enrolled at OSU in 2018.

== College career ==
Jefferson became the school's starting running back as a true freshman in 2018 and rushed for 238 yards in his second game, a 48–25 win against Southern Utah. Three weeks later, he rushed for a career-high 254 yards in a 52–24 loss to Arizona State. Through the first six games of his freshman season, Jefferson ranked third among all Division I FBS players with 865 rushing yards. Jefferson ended the season with twelve touchdown runs, 1,380 rushing yards, and was named Pac-12 freshman offensive player of the year.

Jefferson returned to the Beavers for his sophomore season in 2019. He rushed for 685 yards and eight touchdowns in his sophomore year.

Jefferson returned to the Beavers for his junior season in 2020. He finished with 858 rushing yards and six rushing touchdowns in just six games. After the season, he decided to forgo his senior year and enter the 2021 NFL draft.

== Professional career ==
Pre-draft measurables
Height	Weight	Arm length	Hand span	Wingspan	40-yard dash	10-yard split	20-yard split	20-yard shuttle	Three-cone drill	Vertical jump	Broad jump	Bench press
5 ft 10 1/8 in (1.78 m)	206 lb (93 kg)	30 1/2 in (0.77 m)	9 5/8 in (0.24 m)	6 ft 2 1/4 in (1.89 m)	4.60 s	1.59 s	2.70 s	4.39 s	7.39 s	31.0 in (0.79 m)	9 ft 7 in (2.92 m)	13 reps
All values from Pro Day

=== Detroit Lions ===
Jefferson was selected in the seventh round, 257th overall, by the Detroit Lions in the 2021 NFL draft. He signed his four-year rookie contract with the team on May 14, 2021. On October 31, Jefferson scored his first career touchdown, an eight-yard rush in a blowout loss against the Philadelphia Eagles that proved to be the only points for the Lions in the 44-6 loss. He appeared in seven games and recorded 15 carries for 74 rushing yards and two rushing touchdowns.

On August 31, 2022, Jefferson was waived by the Lions and signed to the team's practice squad the next day. He signed a reserve/future contract with Detroit on January 9, 2023.

On August 29, 2023, Jefferson was waived/injured by the Lions and placed on injured reserve. He was released on September 6, with an injury settlement. On October 24, the Lions signed Jefferson to their practice squad. He signed a reserve/future contract with the Lions on January 30, 2024.

Jefferson was waived by the Lions on August 27, 2024, and subsequently re-signed to the practice squad.

=== Tennessee Titans ===
On July 23, 2025, Jefferson signed with the Tennessee Titans. He was waived on August 26 as part of final roster cuts and re-signed to the practice squad the next day. Jefferson was released by the Titans on August 29.

=== Arizona Cardinals ===
On October 1, 2025, Jefferson signed with the Arizona Cardinals' practice squad. On November 21, he was signed to the active roster. On December 1, Jefferson was released and re-signed to the practice squad two days later.

=== San Francisco 49ers ===
On May 28, 2026, Jefferson signed with the San Francisco 49ers. On June 2, Jefferson was waived by the 49ers.

=== Minnesota Vikings ===
On August 12, 2026, Jefferson signed with the Minnesota Vikings. On August 30, he was waived with an injury designation by the Vikings as a part of the final roster cuts.

=== Arizona Cardinals (second stint) ===
On November 4, 2026, Jefferson signed with the Arizona Cardinals practice squad. On November 10, he was released.
