= Quintez Cephus =

American football player (born 1998)

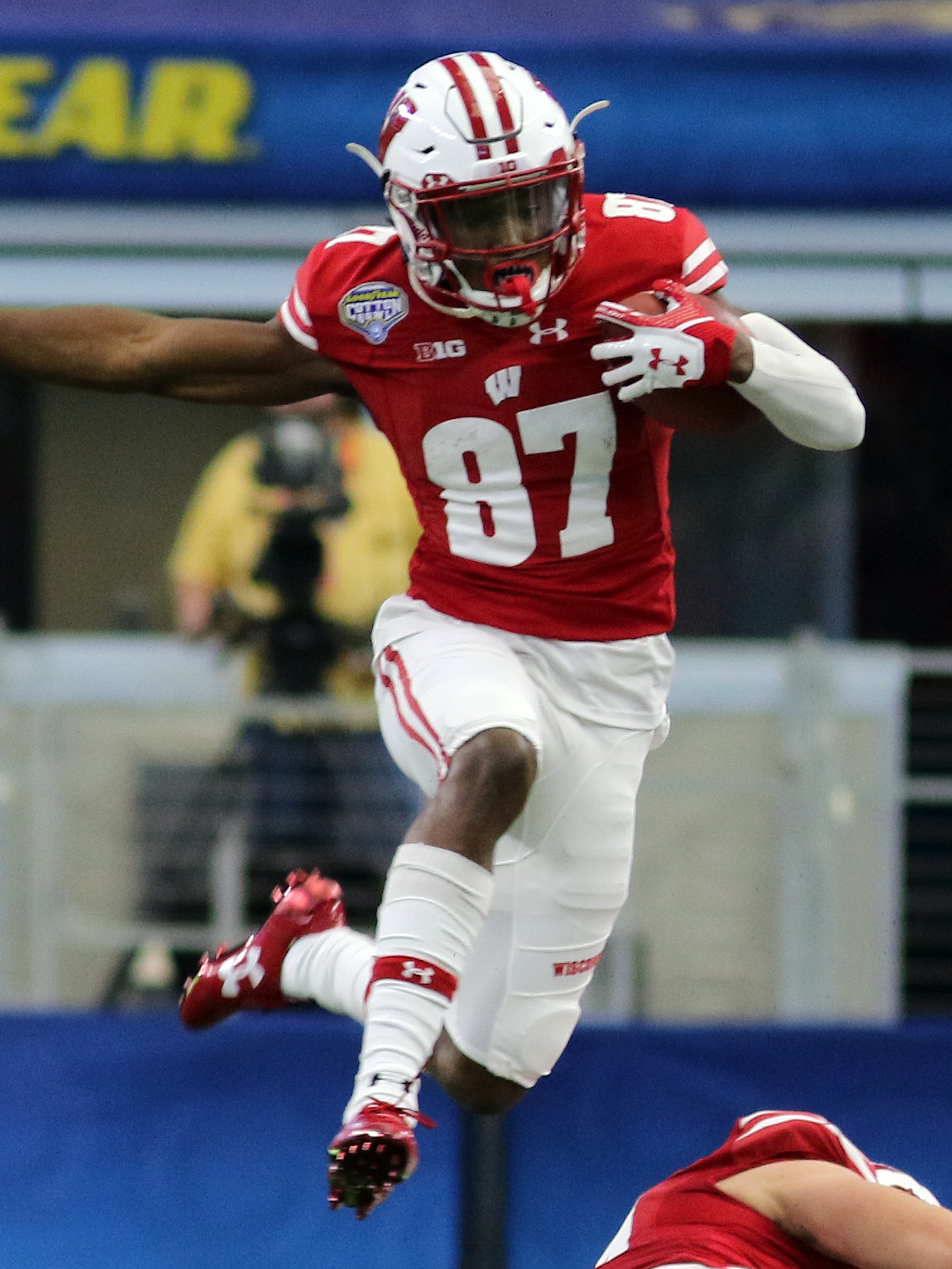
- Cephus with the Wisconsin Badgers in 2017

Profile
- Position: Wide receiver

Personal information
- Born: April 1, 1998 (age 28); Macon, Georgia, U.S.
- Listed height: 6 ft 1 in (1.85 m)
- Listed weight: 208 lb (94 kg)

Career information
- High school: Stratford Academy (Macon)
- College: Wisconsin (2016–2019)
- NFL draft: 2020: 5th round, 166th overall pick

Career history
- Detroit Lions (2020–2022); Buffalo Bills (2024)*; Houston Texans (2024)*; Los Angeles Rams (2024)*; San Francisco 49ers (2025)*; Houston Texans (2025)*
- * Offseason or practice squad member only

Career NFL statistics as of 2025
- Receptions: 37
- Receiving yards: 568
- Receiving touchdowns: 4
- Stats at Pro Football Reference

Quintez Cephus (born April 1, 1998) is an American professional football wide receiver. He played college football for the Wisconsin Badgers and was selected by the Detroit Lions in the fifth round of the 2020 NFL draft.

== Early life ==
While playing high school football at Stratford Academy in Macon, Georgia, Cephus played running back, wide receiver and defense, earning a three-star recruiting grade.

== College career ==
Cephus committed to Wisconsin on November 13, 2015. He also received offers from Miami, Georgia Tech, Vanderbilt and Georgia Southern. Cephus had also committed to Furman for basketball but decided to pursue football as a "business decision".

During his sophomore season, Cephus caught thirty passes and had his first career collegiate 100-yard receiving game, against Purdue. However, a broken leg, sustained against Indiana on November 4, sidelined Cephus for the rest of the season and required surgery.

After Cephus missed his junior season due to pending legal charges, the NCAA cleared him to play on August 23, 2019. After being expelled and reinstated by the school, Cephus said he returned to the football team because unlike others at the school, the football team never stopped supporting him. Cephus was noted for his ability to separate from defenders on the field of play during his senior season.

On January 6, 2020, Cephus declared for the 2020 NFL draft. The move came after Cephus led the 2019 Badgers team in receptions, receiving yards and receiving touchdowns. He also participated in the 2020 NFL Scouting Combine, where he drew praise from other players at the Combine.

== Professional career ==
Pre-draft measurables
Height	Weight	Arm length	Hand span	Wingspan	40-yard dash	10-yard split	20-yard split	20-yard shuttle	Three-cone drill	Vertical jump	Broad jump	Bench press
6 ft 0 7/8 in (1.85 m)	202 lb (92 kg)	32 1/8 in (0.82 m)	8 3/4 in (0.22 m)	6 ft 5 in (1.96 m)	4.62 s	1.60 s	2.69 s	4.33 s	7.20 s	38.5 in (0.98 m)	10 ft 4 in (3.15 m)	23 reps
All values from NFL Combine/Pro Day

=== Detroit Lions ===
Cephus was selected at in the fifth round with the 166th overall pick in the 2020 NFL draft by the Detroit Lions. The Lions previously acquired the selection used on Cephus as a result of the trade that sent cornerback Darius Slay to the Philadelphia Eagles. On July 13, 2020, the Lions signed Cephus to a four-year contract. In Week 13, against the Chicago Bears, he scored his first professional touchdown on a 49-yard reception from quarterback Matthew Stafford.

On October 12, 2021, Cephus was placed on injured reserve with a shoulder injury.

On October 8, 2022, Cephus was once again placed on injured reserve.

On April 21, 2023, Cephus was suspended indefinitely (at least one season) after it was discovered he had violated the league’s gambling policy by betting on NFL games. He was subsequently released by the Lions following the incident.

On April 18, 2024, Cephus was reinstated by the NFL.

=== Buffalo Bills ===
On April 29, 2024, Cephus signed a one-year contract with the Buffalo Bills, but was released on May 16.

=== Houston Texans ===
On July 18, 2024, Cephus signed with the Houston Texans. He was released on August 27.

=== Los Angeles Rams ===
On September 18, 2024, Cephus was signed to the Los Angeles Rams practice squad. He signed a reserve/future contract with Los Angeles on January 20, 2025.

On June 25, 2025, Cephus was waived by the Rams.

=== San Francisco 49ers ===
On July 24, 2025, Cephus signed with the San Francisco 49ers. However, he would be waived by San Francisco on July 28.

=== Houston Texans (second stint) ===
On August 6, 2025, Cephus signed with the Houston Texans. He was released on August 26 as part of final roster cuts. Cephus was re-signed to the Texans practice squad on September 24.

== NFL career statistics ==
Year	Team	Games		Receiving							Fumbles	
Year	Team	GP	GS	Rec	Tgt	Yds	Avg	Lng	TD	FD	Fum	Lost
2020	DET	13	2	20	35	349	17.5	49	2	16	0	0
2021	DET	5	3	15	22	204	13.6	46	2	9	0	0
2022	DET	4	1	2	3	15	7.5	9	0	1	0	0
Career		22	6	37	60	568	15.4	49	4	26	0	0

== Personal life ==
In the early morning hours of April 22, 2018, Cephus engaged in sexual acts with two women. Cephus claimed the acts were consensual, but the women claimed that they were too drunk to give consent legally and that Cephus sexually assaulted them. Later that day, the Dane County Sheriff's Department searched Cephus' apartment, and in August, Cephus was suspended from the Badgers football team. Also in August, Cephus was formally charged with second- and third-degree counts of sexual assault of an intoxicated victim.

On October 9, Cephus sued the University of Wisconsin-Madison in federal court, stating that the university's Title IX investigation, occurring simultaneously with the Dane County investigation, deprived Cephus of due process relating to the Fifth Amendment. Also in October, Cephus entered a not guilty plea, with a trial set for February, although that was later delayed to August. During spring of 2019, Cephus left the University of Wisconsin-Madison. It was later revealed that he was expelled by the school. In March 2019, Cephus dropped his lawsuit against the university.

On August 2, Cephus was acquitted on both counts. UW later re-admitted Cephus as a student before the 2019 fall semester, citing new information in their investigation.
