= Kalif Raymond =

American football player (born 1994)

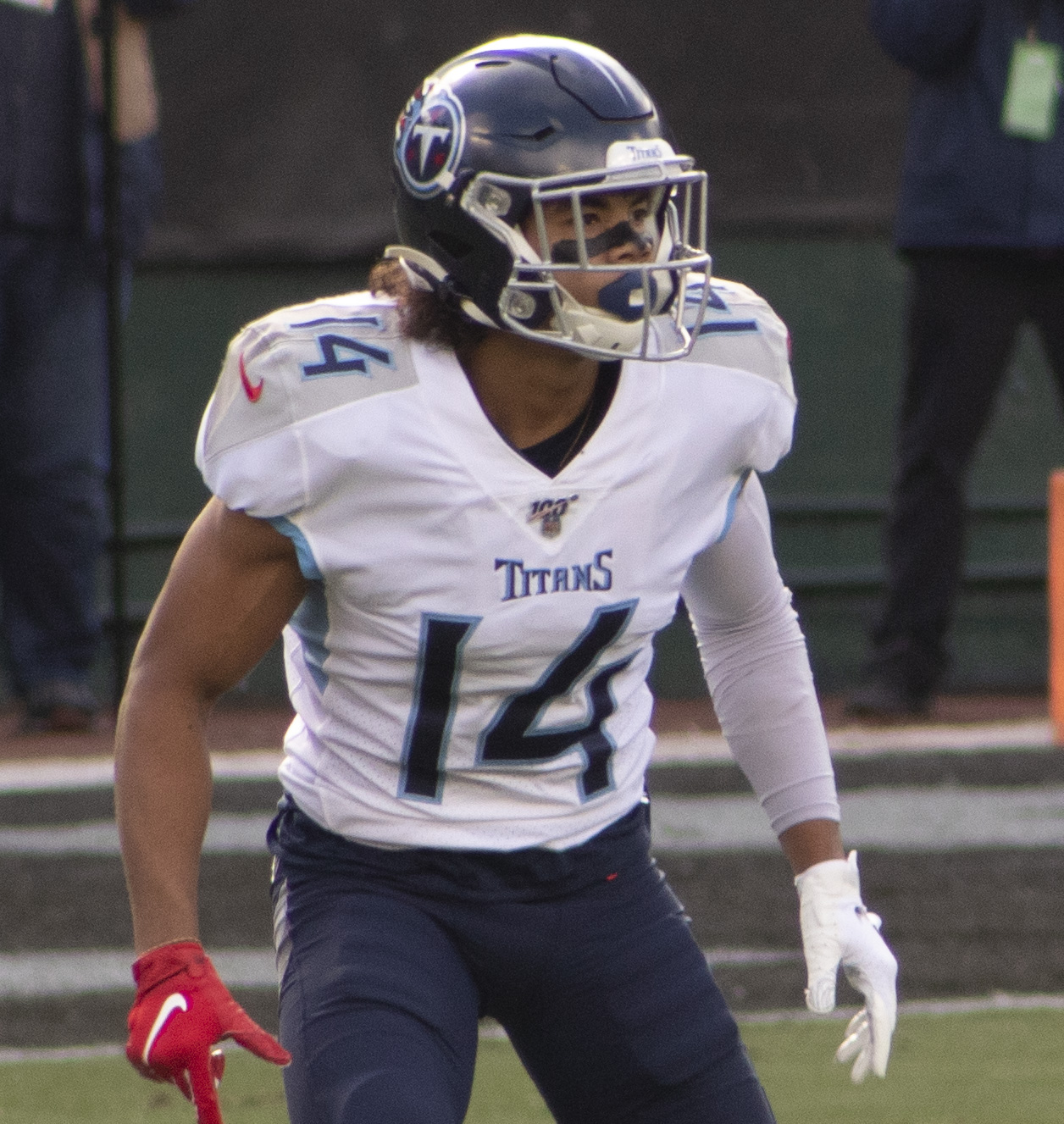
- Raymond with the Tennessee Titans in 2019

No. 14 – Chicago Bears
- Position: Wide receiver
- Roster status: Active

Personal information
- Born: August 8, 1994 (age 32); Lawrenceville, Georgia, U.S.
- Listed height: 5 ft 9 in (1.75 m)
- Listed weight: 160 lb (73 kg)

Career information
- High school: Greater Atlanta Christian (Norcross, Georgia)
- College: Holy Cross (2012–2015)
- NFL draft: 2016: undrafted

Career history
- Denver Broncos (2016); New York Jets (2017); New York Giants (2017); Tennessee Titans (2018)*; New York Giants (2018)*; Tennessee Titans (2018–2020); Detroit Lions (2021–2025); Chicago Bears (2026–present)
- * Offseason or practice squad member only

Awards and highlights
- 2× Second-team All-Pro (2022, 2024) (Note: Selected as a punt returner); NFL punt return yards leader (2024)

Career NFL statistics as of Week 9, 2026
- Receptions: 222
- Receiving yards: 2,844
- Rushing yards: 186
- Return yards: 3,495
- Total touchdowns: 13
- Stats at Pro Football Reference

Kalif Raymond (born August 8, 1994) is an American professional football wide receiver and punt returner for the Chicago Bears of the National Football League (NFL). He played college football for the Holy Cross Crusaders and signed with the Denver Broncos as an undrafted free agent in 2016. Raymond joined the Lions in 2021 and was a second-team All-Pro punt returner in 2022 and 2024. He was also the NFL punt return yards leader in 2024 despite missing five games. Raymond has also been a member of the Tennessee Titans, New York Jets, New York Giants, and Detroit Lions.

== Early life ==
Raymond was born in Lawrenceville, Georgia, to an African-American father and a Chinese mother. He played college football and track for the Holy Cross Crusaders from 2012 to 2015. In football, he was a two-time All-Patriot League first team performer, amassing 4,059 all purpose yards and 18 touchdowns in his career. In track, Raymond was a two time All-New England selection, highlighted by a second place finish in the 100-meter dash at the 2015 New England outdoor championships.

== Professional career ==
Pre-draft measurables
Height	Weight
5 ft 8 5/8 in (1.74 m)	162 lb (73 kg)
Values from Pro Day

=== Denver Broncos ===
On May 3, 2016, the Denver Broncos signed Raymond as an undrafted free agent. He was released on September 3 during final roster cuts, but was signed to the practice squad two days later. Raymond was promoted to active roster on December 2.

On September 2, 2017, Raymond was waived by the Broncos.

=== New York Jets ===
Raymond was claimed off waivers by the New York Jets on September 3, 2017. In the season opener against the Buffalo Bills, Raymond was the kickoff and punt returner in his Jets debut.

Raymond was waived on September 19, but was re-signed to the practice squad two days later. He was released on September 26.

=== New York Giants (first stint) ===
On October 11, 2017, Raymond was signed to the New York Giants' practice squad. He was released on October 31, but was re-signed the next day. He was promoted to the active roster on November 14.

On September 1, 2018, Raymond was waived by the Giants.

=== Tennessee Titans ===
On September 25, 2018, Raymond was signed to the Tennessee Titans' practice squad. He was released on October 2.

=== New York Giants (second stint) ===
On October 16, 2018, Raymond was signed to the Giants' practice squad, but was released two days later.

=== Tennessee Titans (second stint) ===
On December 24, 2018, Raymond was signed to the Titans practice squad. He signed a reserve/future contract on December 31.

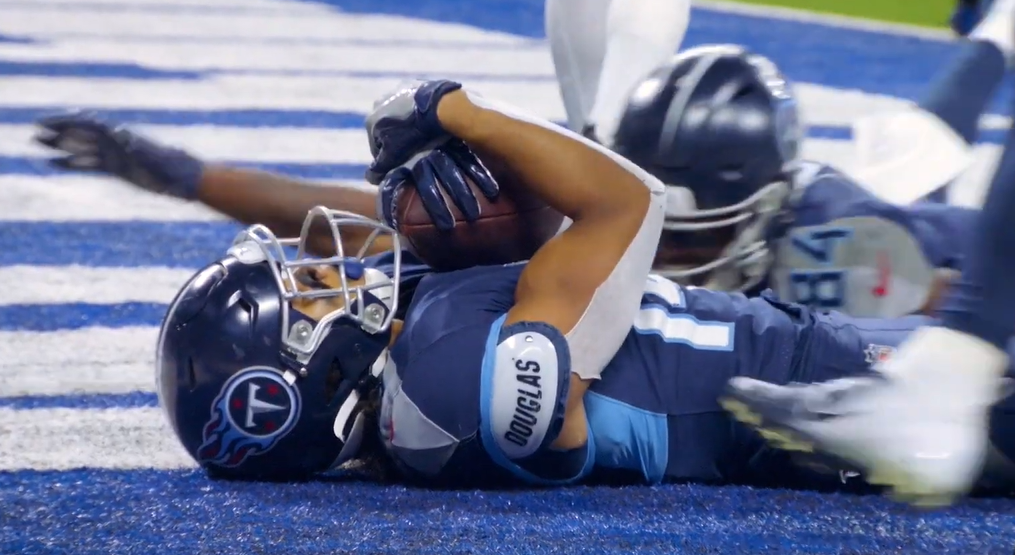
Raymond after scoring a touchdown in a game against the Indianapolis Colts in 2019

On September 7, 2019, Raymond was waived by the Titans and was re-signed to the practice squad. He was promoted to the active roster on October 26. During Week 10 against the Kansas City Chiefs, Raymond caught a 52-yard pass from Ryan Tannehill and returned three kicks for 46 yards in the 35–32 victory. Three weeks later, he scored his first NFL touchdown on a 40-yard pass from Tannehill in a 31–17 road victory over the Indianapolis Colts. Raymond gave the football to his mother who was in attendance. On the 2019 season, Raymond totaled nine receptions for 170 yards and a touchdown in eight games. In the Divisional Round against the Baltimore Ravens, he caught a 45-yard touchdown during the 28–12 road victory.

In Week 3 of the 2020 season, Raymond had three receptions for 118 yards in the 31–30 victory over the Minnesota Vikings. He was placed on the reserve/COVID-19 list by the Titans on December 19, and was activated six days later.

=== Detroit Lions ===
On March 25, 2021, Raymond signed with the Detroit Lions. On October 3, he scored two touchdowns in a 24–14 loss to the Chicago Bears.

On March 18, 2022, Raymond signed a two-year, $9.5 million contract extension with the Lions. On December 18, he ran 47 yards for his first career punt return touchdown in a 20–17 win against his former team, the Jets. Raymond was named second-team All-Pro for the 2022 season.

On August 11, 2023, Raymond signed a two-year contract extension with the Lions.

During Week 8 of the 2024 season, Raymond had a 90-yard punt return touchdown along with a seven-yard touchdown reception during a 52–14 victory over the Titans, his former team, earning NFC Special Teams Player of the Week honors. Raymond finished the season with 30 punt returns for 413 yards, leading the league in punt return yards despite missing five games due to injury. As a receiver, he had 17 receptions for 215 yards and two touchdowns. Raymond was named second-team All-Pro as a punt returner.

In Week 4 of the 2025 season against the Cleveland Browns, Raymond returned a punt 65 yards for a touchdown, helping the Lions to a 34–10 victory.

=== Chicago Bears ===
On March 11, 2026, Raymond signed a one-year, $5.1 million contract with the Chicago Bears, reuniting him with head coach Ben Johnson, who was his offensive coordinator with the Lions.

== NFL career statistics ==
Legend
	Led the league
**Bold**	Career-high

=== Regular season ===
Year	Team	Games		Receiving					Rushing					Kick returns					Punt returns					Fumbles	
Year	Team	GP	GS	Rec	Yds	Avg	Lng	TD	Att	Yds	Avg	Lng	TD	Ret	Yds	Avg	Lng	TD	Ret	Yds	Avg	Lng	TD	Fum	Lost
2016	DEN	4	0	0	0	0.0	0	0	0	0	0.0	0	0	6	137	22.8	40	0	11	111	11.0	25	0	2	**1**
2017	NYJ	2	0	0	0	0.0	0	0	0	0	0.0	0	0	3	85	28.3	40	0	5	38	7.6	25	0	**3**	**1**
2017	NYG	6	0	1	12	12.0	12	0	1	−1	−1.0	−1	0	11	186	16.9	24	0	13	61	4.7	17	0	2	0
2019	TEN	8	1	9	170	18.9	52	1	1	−5	−5.0	−5	0	**18**	**403**	22.4	45	0	4	45	11.3	14	0	1	**1**
2020	TEN	15	3	9	187	**20.8**	61	0	1	−3	−3.0	−3	0	15	275	18.3	30	0	23	208	9.0	40	0	0	0
2021	DET	16	**14**	**48**	576	12.0	**75T**	**4**	4	28	7.0	13	0	0	0	0.0	0	0	21	236	11.2	48	0	0	0
2022	DET	**17**	7	47	**616**	13.1	56	0	**7**	36	5.1	12	0	2	65	**32.5**	**52**	0	20	264	13.2	47	**1**	**3**	**1**
2023	DET	**17**	3	35	489	14.0	41	1	**7**	**75**	**10.7**	**40**	0	0	0	0.0	0	0	29	331	10.5	42	0	0	0
2024	DET	12	2	17	215	12.6	38	2	2	0	0.0	12	0	1	26	26.0	26	0	**30**	**413**	**13.8**	**90**	**1**	0	0
2025	DET	15	3	24	289	12.0	30	1	2	19	9.5	10	0	6	161	26.8	44	0	32	241	7.5	65T	1	0	0
2026	CHI	9	7	32	290	9.1	41	1	2	37	18.5	39	0	0	0	0.0	0	0	21	209	10.0	26	0	1	0
Career		121	40	222	2,844	12.8	75T	10	27	186	6.9	40	0	62	1,338	21.6	52	0	209	2,157	10.3	90	3	13	4

=== Postseason ===
Year	Team	Games		Receiving					Rushing					Returning					Fumbles	
Year	Team	GP	GS	Rec	Yds	Avg	Lng	TD	Att	Yds	Avg	Lng	TD	Ret	Yds	Avg	Lng	TD	Fum	Lost
2019	TEN	2	0	1	**45**	**45.0**	**45T**	**1**	0	0	0.0	0	0	**5**	**77**	15.4	**22**	0	0	0
2020	TEN	1	0	0	0	0.0	0	0	0	0	0.0	0	0	2	8	4.0	6	0	0	0
2023	DET	0	0	Did not play due to injury																
2024	DET	1	0	**3**	37	12.3	15	0	0	0	0.0	0	0	1	21	**21.0**	21	0	0	0
Career		4	0	4	82	20.5	45T	1	0	0	0.0	0	0	8	106	13.3	22	0	0	0

== Personal life ==
Raymond is of half Chinese descent.
