= List of current AFC team rosters =

The following is a list of current American Football Conference (AFC) team rosters:

Reserve list key
Code	Roster designation
IR	Injured reserve
IR-DFR	Injured reserve/designated for return
W/I	Waived/injured
PUP	Physically unable to perform
NF-Inj.	Non-football injury
NF-Ill.	Non-football illness
Active/PUP	Active/physically unable to perform
Active/NF-Inj.	Active/non-football injury
Active/NF-Ill.	Active/non-football illness
PS/I	Practice squad/injured
PS/NFI	Practice squad/non-football injury
PS/EX	Practice squad exempt
Susp.	Suspended
Franchise	Franchise tag
Transition	Transition tag
Futures	Futures contract
DNR	Did not report
Left Squad	Reserve/left squad
Military	Reserve/military
Exempt	Commissioner's Exempt List

== AFC East ==
=== Buffalo Bills ===
Buffalo Bills roster
Quarterbacks (QB): 17 Josh Allen; 6 Shane Buechele; 11 Mitchell Trubisky; 14 Mike White; Running backs (RB): 4 James Cook; 22 Ray Davis; 21 Darrynton Evans; 41 Reggie Gilliam FB; 20 Frank Gore Jr.; 26 Ty Johnson; Wide receivers (WR): 16 Kelly Akharaiyi; 32 Deon Cain; 0 Keon Coleman; 89 Stephen Gosnell; 19 K. J. Hamler; 18 Elijah Moore; 5 Josh Palmer; 81 Kaden Prather; 1 Curtis Samuel; 10 Khalil Shakir; 80 Tyrell Shavers; 15 Laviska Shenault; 13 Jalen Virgil; 82 Kristian Wilkerson; Tight ends (TE): 84 Zach Davidson; 85 Jackson Hawes; 86 Dalton Kincaid; 88 Dawson Knox; 83 Keleki Latu; 87 Matt Sokol	Offensive linemen (OL): 70 Alec Anderson RT; 61 Jacob Bayer C; 67 Travis Clayton RT (IPP); 73 Dion Dawkins LT; 76 David Edwards LG; 65 Mike Edwards RT; 75 Richard Gouraige RT; 68 Tylan Grable LT; 53 Kendrick Green C; 77 Chase Lundt RT; 66 Connor McGovern C; 63 Rush Reimer G; 64 O'Cyrus Torrence RG; 74 Ryan Van Demark LT; Defensive linemen (DL): 97 Joey Bosa DE; 90 DeWayne Carter DT; 57 A. J. Epenesa DE; 52 Hayden Harris DE; 72 Marcus Harris DT; 55 Michael Hoecht DE; 94 Landon Jackson DE; 92 DaQuan Jones DT; 93 Zion Logue DT; 99 Larry Ogunjobi DT; 91 Ed Oliver DT; 71 Casey Rogers DT; 50 Greg Rousseau DE; 98 T. J. Sanders DT; 59 Paris Shand DE; 56 Javon Solomon DE; 96 Deone Walker DT	Linebackers (LB): 44 Joe Andreessen MLB; 8 Terrel Bernard MLB; 49 Keonta Jenkins OLB; 58 Matt Milano OLB; 54 Baylon Spector OLB; 45 Shaq Thompson OLB; 48 Edefuan Ulofoshio MLB; 42 Dorian Williams OLB; Defensive backs (DB): 47 Christian Benford CB; 24 Cole Bishop FS; 29 Brandon Codrington CB; 33 Te'Cory Couch CB; 28 Darrick Forrest SS; 31 Maxwell Hairston CB; 3 Damar Hamlin FS; 37 Jordan Hancock CB; 25 Daequan Hardy CB; 46 Ja'Marcus Ingram CB; 23 Dane Jackson CB; 7 Taron Johnson CB; 39 Cam Lewis CB; 30 Wande Owens S; 9 Taylor Rapp SS; 43 Dorian Strong CB; 27 Tre'Davious White CB; Special teams (ST): 2 Tyler Bass K; 69 Reid Ferguson LS; 40 Brad Robbins P	Reserve: 79 Spencer Brown RT (PUP); 62 Sedrick Van Pran-Granger C (PUP) 88 active (1 exempt), 2 reserve As of July 28, 2025. Rookies in italics.; Roster; Depth chart; Transactions

=== Miami Dolphins ===
Miami Dolphins roster
Quarterbacks (QB): 14 Quinn Ewers; 1 Tua Tagovailoa; 0 Zach Wilson; Running backs (RB): 28 De'Von Achane; 31 Ollie Gordon II; 30 Alec Ingold FB; 8 Alexander Mattison; 38 Nate Noel; 5 Jaylen Wright; Wide receivers (WR): 19 Andrew Armstrong; 48 Monaray Baldwin; 86 Tarik Black; 82 D'Wayne Eskridge; 84 Erik Ezukanma; 88 A. J. Henning; 10 Tyreek Hill; 17 Jaylen Waddle; 7 Tahj Washington; 6 Malik Washington; 81 Theo Wease Jr.; 18 Nick Westbrook-Ikhine; Tight ends (TE): 85 Pharaoh Brown; 80 Tanner Conner; 47 Jalin Conyers; 89 Julian Hill; 87 Hayden Rucci	Offensive linemen (OL): 79 Larry Borom LT; 55 Aaron Brewer C; 64 Daniel Brunskill C; 76 Jackson Carman RT; 66 Braeden Daniels RT; 78 James Daniels G; 62 Obinna Eze T; 77 Ryan Hayes RT; 73 Austin Jackson RT; 70 Bayron Matos RT (IPP); 60 Andrew Meyer C; 52 Patrick Paul LT; 68 Josh Priebe G; 72 Jonah Savaiinaea G; 71 Kion Smith LT; 65 Addison West C; Defensive linemen (DL): 93 Zeek Biggers DT; 91 Matthew Butler DT; 98 Matt Dickerson DE; 90 Kenneth Grant DT; 96 Alex Huntley DT; 95 Benito Jones DT; 94 Jordan Phillips DT; 92 Zach Sieler DT; 97 Ben Stille DE	Linebackers (LB): 51 Eugene Asante ILB; 56 Quinton Bell OLB; 3 K. J. Britt ILB; 20 Jordyn Brooks ILB; 2 Bradley Chubb OLB; 11 Tyrel Dodson ILB; 40 Willie Gay ILB; 53 Cameron Goode OLB; 57 Dequan Jackson ILB; 50 Mohamed Kamara OLB; 59 Derrick McLendon OLB; 42 Grayson Murphy OLB; 15 Jaelan Phillips OLB; 44 Chop Robinson OLB; 41 Channing Tindall ILB; Defensive backs (DB): 45 B. J. Adams CB; 26 Cornell Armstrong CB; 27 Ethan Bonner CB; 22 Elijah Campbell FS; 34 Jordan Colbert SS; 21 Ashtyn Davis SS; 36 Storm Duck CB; 29 Minkah Fitzpatrick FS; -- Mike Hilton CB; 37 Isaiah Johnson CB; 23 Jack Jones CB; 4 Kader Kohou CB; 33 Jason Marshall Jr. CB; 32 Patrick McMorris SS; 46 Ethan Robinson CB; 35 John Saunders Jr. SS; 14 Kendall Sheffield CB; 24 Cam Smith CB; 25 Dante Trader Jr. S; Special teams (ST): 16 Jake Bailey P; 67 Joe Cardona LS; 7 Jason Sanders K; 49 Ryan Stonehouse P	Reserve: 23 Artie Burns CB (IR); 74 Liam Eichenberg G (PUP); 43 Jason Maitre CB (IR); 9 Ifeatu Melifonwu FS (NF-Inj.); 83 Darren Waller TE (PUP) 87 active (1 exempt), 3 reserve As of July 26, 2025. Rookies in italics.; Roster; Depth chart; Transactions

=== New England Patriots ===
New England Patriots roster
Quarterbacks (QB): 11 Joshua Dobbs; 10 Drake Maye; 17 Ben Wooldridge; Running backs (RB): 4 Antonio Gibson; 32 TreVeyon Henderson; 26 Terrell Jennings; 46 Brock Lampe FB; 34 Lan Larison; 38 Rhamondre Stevenson; 49 Trayveon Williams; Wide receivers (WR): 6 Javon Baker; 30 Demeer Blankumsee; 84 Kendrick Bourne; 9 Kayshon Boutte; 86 Efton Chism; 8 Stefon Diggs; 3 Demario Douglas; 83 John Jiles; 1 Ja'Lynn Polk; 29 Jeremiah Webb; 18 Kyle Williams; Tight ends (TE): 88 Jaheim Bell; 82 CJ Dippre; 85 Hunter Henry; 80 Gee Scott Jr.; 87 Jack Westover	Offensive linemen (OL): 65 Garrett Bradbury C; 77 Ben Brown C; 52 Marcus Bryant LT; 63 Mekhi Butler LG; 66 Will Campbell LT; 74 Jack Conley RG; 72 Yasir Durant LT; 75 Demontrey Jacobs RT; 76 Morgan Moses RT; 71 Mike Onwenu RG; 64 Layden Robinson LG; 55 Tyrese Robinson LG; 62 Sidy Sow RG; 69 Cole Strange LG; 70 Caedan Wallace RT; 58 Jared Wilson C; Defensive linemen (DL): 90 Christian Barmore DT; 92 Joshua Farmer DT; 68 Isaiah Iton DT; 54 Truman Jones DE; 96 David Olajiga DT (IPP); 98 Jeremiah Pharms Jr. DT; 93 Jahvaree Ritzie DT; 94 Jaquelin Roy DT; 95 Khyiris Tonga DT; 99 Keion White DE; 97 Milton Williams DE	Linebackers (LB): 44 K'Lavon Chaisson OLB; 53 Christian Elliss MLB; 51 Jack Gibbens MLB; 33 Anfernee Jennings OLB; 2 Harold Landry OLB; 15 Marte Mapu MLB; 91 Elijah Ponder OLB; 45 Monty Rice OLB; 42 Cam Riley OLB; 14 Robert Spillane MLB; 43 Bradyn Swinson OLB; 48 Jahlani Tavai MLB; Defensive backs (DB): 28 Alex Austin CB; 35 Miles Battle CB; 29 Isaiah Bolden CB; 37 Brandon Crossley CB; 7 Carlton Davis CB; 27 Marcellas Dial CB; 23 Kyle Dugger SS; 22 Marcus Epps FS; 0 Christian Gonzalez CB; 21 Jaylinn Hawkins SS; 30 D. J. James CB; 25 Marcus Jones CB; 16 Josh Minkins FS; 19 Kobee Minor CB; 5 Jabrill Peppers FS; 24 Dell Pettus FS; 39 Jordan Polk CB; 41 Brenden Schooler SS; 31 Craig Woodson FS; Special teams (ST): 47 Julian Ashby LS; 17 Bryce Baringer P; 36 Andres Borregales K; 37 John Parker Romo K	Reserve: 13 Mack Hollins WR (PUP); 81 Austin Hooper TE (PUP); 59 Vederian Lowe LT (PUP) 87 active (1 exempt), 3 reserve As of July 20, 2025. Rookies in italics.; Roster; Depth chart; Transactions

=== New York Jets ===
New York Jets roster
Quarterbacks (QB): 4 Brady Cook; 7 Justin Fields; 15 Adrian Martinez; 2 Tyrod Taylor; Running backs (RB): 0 Braelon Allen; 47 Andrew Beck FB; 32 Isaiah Davis; 40 Donovan Edwards; 38 Zach Evans; 20 Breece Hall; 34 Kene Nwangwu; Wide receivers (WR): 6 Malachi Corley; 3 Xavier Gipson; 16 Tyler Johnson; 10 Allen Lazard; 35 Dymere Miller; 36 Jamaal Pritchett; 83 Josh Reynolds; 39 Quentin Skinner; 82 Arian Smith; 87 Brandon Smith; 5 Garrett Wilson; 81 Ontaria Wilson; Tight ends (TE): 86 Neal Johnson; 88 Zack Kuntz; 89 Jeremy Ruckert; 84 Stone Smartt; 85 Mason Taylor	Offensive linemen (OL): 74 Olu Fashanu LT; 63 Gus Hartwig C; 77 Marquis Hayes RG; 68 Samuel Jackson T; 60 Kohl Levao LG; 70 Armand Membou RT; 61 Max Mitchell RG; 71 Josh Myers C; 65 Xavier Newman-Johnson LG; 79 Chukwuma Okorafor RT; 76 John Simpson LG; 66 Joe Tippmann C; 75 Alijah Vera-Tucker RG; 67 Carter Warren LT; 64 Leander Wiegand RG (IPP); Defensive linemen (DL): 94 Tyler Baron DE; 72 Micheal Clemons DE; 93 Byron Cowart DT; 97 Michael Fletcher DE; 92 Kingsley Jonathan DE; 98 Phidarian Mathis DT; 9 Will McDonald IV DE; 55 Braiden McGregor DE; 62 Fatorma Mulbah DT; 91 Derrick Nnadi DT; 69 Payton Page DT; 96 Leonard Taylor III DT; 78 Jay Tufele DT; 58 Eric Watts DE; 99 Rashad Weaver DE; 54 Ja’Markis Weston DE; 95 Quinnen Williams DT	Linebackers (LB): 53 Zaire Barnes OLB; 52 Jamin Davis OLB; 51 Francisco Mauigoa MLB; 41 Marcelino McCrary-Ball OLB; 44 Jamien Sherwood MLB; 49 Jackson Sirmon MLB; 48 Aaron Smith OLB; 56 Quincy Williams OLB; Defensive backs (DB): 22 Tony Adams SS; 29 Jarrick Bernard-Converse CB; 17 Kris Boyd CB; 30 Michael Carter II CB; 8 Andre Cisco FS; 35 Dean Clark FS; 33 Jordan Clark CB; 30 Bump Cooper Jr. CB; 1 Sauce Gardner CB; 31 Tanner McCalister S; 25 Jarius Monroe SS; 27 Malachi Moore SS; 26 Isaiah Oliver CB; 36 Jaylin Simpson FS; 21 Brandon Stephens CB; 37 Qwan'tez Stiggers CB; 23 Azareye'h Thomas CB; Special teams (ST): 43 Caden Davis K; 42 Thomas Hennessy LS; 14 Austin McNamara P; 45 Harrison Mevis K	Reserve: 19 Irvin Charles WR (PUP); 11 Jermaine Johnson II DE (PUP) 90 active (1 exempt) As of July 26, 2025. Rookies in italics.; Roster; Depth chart; Transactions

== AFC North ==
=== Baltimore Ravens ===
Baltimore Ravens roster
Quarterbacks (QB): 8 Lamar Jackson; 13 Devin Leary; 15 Cooper Rush; Running backs (RB): 26 Rasheen Ali; 22 Derrick Henry; 43 Justice Hill; 36 Marcus Major; 34 Keaton Mitchell; 42 Patrick Ricard FB; 47 Lucas Scott FB; Wide receivers (WR): 86 Jahmal Banks; 7 Rashod Bateman; 12 Malik Cunningham; 4 Zay Flowers; 87 Xavier Guillory; 10 DeAndre Hopkins; 18 Keith Kirkwood; 6 Anthony Miller; 82 Dayton Wade; 81 Devontez Walker; 16 Tylan Wallace; 83 LaJohntay Wester; Tight ends (TE): 89 Mark Andrews; 88 Charlie Kolar; 80 Isaiah Likely; 84 Zaire Mitchell-Paden; 85 Sam Pitz	Offensive linemen (OL): 67 Corey Bullock RT; 78 Gerad Christian-Lichtenhan LT; 66 Ben Cleveland RG; 76 Darrian Dalcourt LG; 74 Garrett Dellinger RG; 77 Daniel Faalele RG; 56 Reid Holskey RG; 65 Ozzie Hutchinson LT; 64 Tyler Linderbaum C; 68 Joe Noteboom LT; 63 Jared Penning LG; 70 Roger Rosengarten RT; 61 Nick Samac C; 79 Ronnie Stanley LT; 71 Carson Vinson LT; 72 Andrew Vorhees LG; Defensive linemen (DL): 62 John Jenkins NT; 69 Jayson Jones DE; 98 Travis Jones DE; 92 Nnamdi Madubuike DE; 94 Adedayo Odeleye DE; 97 C. J. Okoye DE; 93 Aeneas Peebles DE; 91 C. J. Ravenell DE; 96 Broderick Washington NT	Linebackers (LB): 54 Diwun Black OLB; 40 Teddye Buchanan ILB; 45 Mike Green OLB; 59 Malik Hamm OLB; 49 Jay Higgins ILB; 35 Jake Hummel ILB; 50 Adisa Isaac OLB; 57 William Kwenkeu ILB; 48 Chandler Martin ILB; 90 David Ojabo OLB (IPP); 99 Odafe Oweh OLB; 95 Tavius Robinson OLB; 56 Kaimon Rucker OLB; 32 Trenton Simpson ILB; 0 Roquan Smith ILB; 53 Kyle Van Noy OLB; Defensive backs (DB): 23 Jaire Alexander CB; 5 Jalyn Armour-Davis CB; 3 Chidobe Awuzie CB; 25 Beau Brade SS; 14 Kyle Hamilton SS; 44 Marlon Humphrey CB; 41 Desmond Igbinosun FS; 39 Keondre Jackson FS; 21 Sanoussi Kane SS; 31 Bilhal Kone CB; 37 Robert Longerbeam CB; 30 Reuben Lowery CB; 38 Keyon Martin CB; 28 Marquise Robinson CB; 24 Malaki Starks FS; 27 T. J. Tampa CB; 2 Nate Wiggins CB; Special teams (ST): 5 John Hoyland K; 33 Tyler Loop K; 46 Nick Moore LS; 11 Jordan Stout P	Reserve: 51 Emery Jones Jr. LG (NF-Inj.); 29 Ar'Darius Washington FS (PUP) 90 active (1 exempt) As of July 19, 2025. Rookies in italics.; Roster; Depth chart; Transactions

=== Cincinnati Bengals ===
Cincinnati Bengals roster
Quarterbacks (QB): 6 Jake Browning; 9 Joe Burrow; 4 Desmond Ridder; 10 Payton Thorne; Running backs (RB): 32 Gary Brightwell; 25 Tahj Brooks; 30 Chase Brown; 4 Quali Conley; 36 Kendall Milton; 34 Samaje Perine; Wide receivers (WR): 17 Cole Burgess; 81 Jermaine Burton; 1 Ja'Marr Chase; 5 Tee Higgins; 80 Andrei Iosivas; 15 Charlie Jones; 16 Jamoi Mayes; 14 Jordan Moore; 12 Rashod Owens; 19 Kendric Pryor; 82 Mitchell Tinsley; 18 Isaiah Williams; Tight ends (TE): 88 Mike Gesicki; 85 Cam Grandy; 87 Tanner Hudson; 84 Tanner McLachlan; 89 Drew Sample; 86 Kole Taylor	Offensive linemen (OL): 75 Orlando Brown T; 76 Devin Cochran T; 79 Andrew Coker T; 77 Caleb Etienne T; 63 Dylan Fairchild G; 61 Cody Ford G; 64 Ted Karras C; 60 Jaxson Kirkland G; 65 Matt Lee C; 71 Amarius Mims T; 62 Lucas Patrick G; 66 Andrew Raym C; 74 Jalen Rivers T; 73 Andrew Stueber T; 67 Cordell Volson G; Defensive linemen (DL): 72 McTelvin Agim DT; 70 Taven Bryan DT; 95 Howard Cross III DT; 94 Eric Gregory DT; 92 B. J. Hill DT; 93 McKinnley Jackson DT; 90 Kris Jenkins DT; 52 Cedric Johnson DE; 56 Raymond Johnson DE; 99 Myles Murphy DE; 58 Joseph Ossai DE; 96 Cameron Sample DE; 98 Tedarrell Slaton DT; 97 Shemar Stewart DE; 51 Isaiah Thomas DE	Linebackers (LB): 42 Oren Burks OLB; 49 Barrett Carter OLB; 53 Joe Giles-Harris OLB; 50 Shaka Heyward MLB; 44 Demetrius Knight MLB; 45 Maema Njongmeta MLB; 55 Logan Wilson OLB; 59 Craig Young OLB; Defensive backs (DB): 26 Tycen Anderson FS; 33 Daijahn Anthony SS; 27 Jordan Battle SS; 41 Nate Brooks CB; 35 Jalen Davis CB; 23 Daxton Hill CB; 38 D. J. Ivey CB; 37 P. J. Jules SS; 43 Jaylen Key SS; 47 Shaquan Loyal SS; 21 Bralyn Lux CB; 28 Josh Newton CB; 39 Lance Robinson CB; 22 Geno Stone FS; 29 Cam Taylor-Britt CB; 20 DJ Turner CB; 24 Marco Wilson CB; Special teams (ST): 48 Cal Adomitis LS; 2 Evan McPherson K; 8 Ryan Rehkow P; 46 William Wagner LS	Reserve: 83 Erick All TE (Active/PUP); 91 Trey Hendrickson DE (DNR); 68 Seth McLaughlin C (Active/NF-Inj.); 31 Zack Moss RB (Active/NF-Inj.) 90 active, 1 reserve As of July 26, 2025. Rookies in italics.; Roster; Depth chart; Transactions

=== Cleveland Browns ===
Cleveland Browns roster
Quarterbacks (QB): 15 Joe Flacco; 5 Dillon Gabriel; 8 Kenny Pickett; 12 Shedeur Sanders; Running backs (RB): 34 Jerome Ford; 36 Troy Hairston FB; 10 Quinshon Judkins; 39 Ahmani Marshall; 22 Dylan Sampson; 20 Pierre Strong Jr.; 35 Toa Taua; Wide receivers (WR): 2 DeAndre Carter; 89 Kaden Davis; 37 Luke Floriea; 3 Jerry Jeudy; 16 Diontae Johnson; 83 Kisean Johnson; 84 Gage Larvadain; 31 Cade McDonald; 80 Jamari Thrash; 19 Cedric Tillman; 38 Winston Wright Jr.; 81 Michael Woods II; Tight ends (TE): 82 Brenden Bates; 87 Sal Cannella; 88 Harold Fannin Jr.; 85 David Njoku; 86 Blake Whiteheart	Offensive linemen (OL): 68 Jackson Barton RT; 75 Joel Bitonio LG; 67 Javion Cohen G; 78 Jack Conklin RT; 72 Jason Ivey LT; 74 Teven Jenkins G; 79 Dawand Jones RT; 64 Brady Latham G; 71 Cornelius Lucas LT; 61 Roy Mbaeteka LT (IPP); 60 Julian Pearl RT; 55 Ethan Pocic C; 77 Wyatt Teller G; 69 Lorenzo Thompson LT; 65 Dartanyan Tinsley G; 56 Luke Wypler C; 70 Zak Zinter G; Defensive linemen (DL): 97 Jowon Briggs DT; 96 Maliek Collins DT; 95 Myles Garrett DE; 94 Mason Graham DT; 93 Shelby Harris DT; 52 KJ Henry DE; 63 Ralph Holley DT; 66 Adin Huntington DE; 92 Sam Kamara DE; 57 Isaiah McGuire DE; 53 Julian Okwara DE; 99 Cameron Thomas DE; 90 Joe Tryon-Shoyinka DE; 91 Alex Wright DE	Linebackers (LB): 17 Jerome Baker MLB; 30 Devin Bush Jr. ILB; 43 Mohamoud Diabate MLB; 42 Easton Mascarenas-Arnold OLB; 59 Winston Reid OLB; 49 Carson Schwesinger OLB; 40 Nathaniel Watson MLB; Defensive backs (DB): 35 Chigozie Anusiem CB; 11 Tony Brown CB; 9 Grant Delpit SS; 41 Chris Edmonds FS; 1 Martin Emerson CB; 26 Myles Harden CB; 33 Ronnie Hickman FS; 27 LaMareon James CB; 28 Rayshawn Jenkins SS; 37 Dom Jones CB; 23 Damontae Kazee FS; 44 Anthony Kendall CB; 31 Donovan McMillon S; 29 Cameron Mitchell CB; 25 Nik Needham CB; 0 Greg Newsome II CB; 21 Denzel Ward CB; Special teams (ST): 13 Corey Bojorquez P; 7 Dustin Hopkins K; 48 Brent Matiscik LS; 50 Rex Sunahara LS; 47 Andre Szmyt K	Reserve: 18 David Bell WR (Active/NF-Inj.); 51 Michael Hall Jr. DT (Active/PUP); 6 Jeremiah Owusu-Koramoah OLB (PUP); 62 Justin Osborne C (IR); 4 Deshaun Watson QB (Active/PUP) 89 active (1 exempt), 2 reserve, 1 unsigned As of July 28, 2025. Rookies in italics.; Roster; Depth chart; Transactions

=== Pittsburgh Steelers ===
Pittsburgh Steelers roster
Quarterbacks (QB): 18 Will Howard; 8 Aaron Rodgers; 2 Mason Rudolph; 17 Skylar Thompson; Running backs (RB): 14 Kenneth Gainwell; 38 Evan Hull; 34 Max Hurleman; 20 Kaleb Johnson; -- Lew Nichols; 27 Trey Sermon; 48 DJ Thomas-Jones FB; 30 Jaylen Warren; Wide receivers (WR): 19 Calvin Austin; 11 Brandon Johnson; 82 Lance McCutcheon; 4 DK Metcalf; 13 Scotty Miller; 15 Ben Skowronek; 89 Roc Taylor; 85 Ke'Shawn Williams; 10 Roman Wilson; 16 Robert Woods; Tight ends (TE): -- Kevin Foelsch; 88 Pat Freiermuth; 87 J. J. Galbreath; 83 Connor Heyward; 81 Jonnu Smith; 80 Darnell Washington	Offensive linemen (OL): 67 Calvin Anderson LT; 74 Spencer Anderson G; 61 Nick Broeker G; 60 Dylan Cook RT; 76 Troy Fautanu RT; 54 Zach Frazier C; 77 Broderick Jones LT; 79 Steven Jones G; 62 Ryan McCollum C; 66 Mason McCormick RG; 72 Doug Nester G; 64 Max Scharping RG; 78 Gareth Warren RT; 71 Aiden Williams G; Defensive linemen (DL): 95 Keeanu Benton DT; 78 Yahya Black NT; 69 Domenique Davis DT; 96 Daniel Ekuale DT; 99 Derrick Harmon DT; 97 Cameron Heyward DT; 98 DeMarvin Leal DE; 91 Logan Lee DT; 92 Isaiahh Loudermilk DT; 94 Dean Lowry DT; 72 Esezi Otomewo DE; 79 Jacob Slade DT	Linebackers (LB): 44 Carson Bruener ILB; 40 Devin Harper ILB; 50 Malik Harrison ILB; 51 Nick Herbig OLB; 56 Alex Highsmith OLB; 55 Cole Holcomb ILB; 53 Eku Leota OLB; 6 Patrick Queen ILB; 93 Mark Robinson ILB; 33 Jack Sawyer OLB; 90 T. J. Watt OLB; 45 Julius Welschof ILB (IPP); 41 Payton Wilson ILB; Defensive backs (DB): 31 Beanie Bishop CB; 29 Sebastian Castro SS; 21 Chuck Clark SS; 26 Brandin Echols CB; 25 DeShon Elliott SS; 17 D'Shawn Jamison CB; 35 Quindell Johnson SS; 34 Donte Kent CB; 28 Miles Killebrew SS; 38 Cameron McCutcheon CB; 37 Kyler McMichael CB; 42 James Pierre CB; 5 Jalen Ramsey CB; 24 Joey Porter Jr. CB; 23 Darius Slay CB; 22 Juan Thornhill FS; 27 Cory Trice CB; Special teams (ST): 45 Tucker Addington LS; 9 Chris Boswell K; 5 Cameron Johnston P; 46 Christian Kuntz LS; 29 Ben Sauls K; 3 Corliss Waitman P	Reserve: 21 Montana Lemonious-Craig WR (IR); 49 Jeremiah Moon OLB (IR); 89 Donald Parham TE (IR); 73 Isaac Seumalo LG (NF-Inj.) 90 active (1 exempt), 3 reserve As of July 29, 2025. Rookies in italics.; Roster; Depth chart; Transactions

== AFC South ==
=== Houston Texans ===
Houston Texans roster
Quarterbacks (QB): 18 Graham Mertz; 10 Davis Mills; 16 Kedon Slovis; 7 C. J. Stroud; Running backs (RB): 44 British Brooks FB; 21 Nick Chubb; 43 Jakob Johnson FB; 22 Jawhar Jordan; 27 Woody Marks; 33 Dare Ogunbowale; 26 J. J. Taylor; Wide receivers (WR): 17 Braxton Berrios; 12 Nico Collins; 81 Jayden Higgins; 19 Xavier Hutchinson; 85 Daniel Jackson; 88 Johnny Johnson III; 89 Xavier Johnson; 13 Christian Kirk; 8 John Metchie III; 82 Jaylin Noel; 84 Justin Watson; 14 Jared Wayne; Tight ends (TE): 9 Brevin Jordan; 42 Luke Lachey; 86 Dalton Schultz; 83 Irv Smith Jr.; 87 Cade Stover	Offensive linemen (OL): 60 Jake Andrews C; 65 Eli Cox C; 76 Austin Deculus RT; 79 Aireontae Ersery LT; 57 Blake Fisher RT; 73 LaDarius Henderson RG; 71 Tytus Howard RT; 69 Ed Ingram RG; 54 Jarrett Patterson C; 74 Cam Robinson LT; 70 Juice Scruggs C; 72 Jaylon Thomas RT; 78 Zachary Thomas RT; 75 Laken Tomlinson LG; Defensive linemen (DL): 51 Will Anderson Jr. DE; 50 Solomon Byrd DE; 97 Mario Edwards Jr. DT; 58 Kyonte Hamilton DT; 92 Dylan Horton DE; 55 Danielle Hunter DE; 90 Sheldon Rankins DT; 98 Tim Settle DT; 53 Junior Tafuna DT; 52 Darrell Taylor DE; 72 Tommy Togiai DT; 94 Casey Toohill DE	Linebackers (LB): 0 Azeez Al-Shaair MLB; 35 Jake Hansen OLB; 48 Christian Harris OLB; 56 Jamal Hill OLB; 32 Nick Niemann OLB; 47 K. C. Ossai LB; 45 E. J. Speed OLB; 39 Henry To'oTo'o MLB; 46 Jackson Woodard MLB; Defensive backs (DB): 41 Damon Arnette CB; 27 Myles Bryant CB; 2 Calen Bullock FS; 23 C. J. Gardner-Johnson SS; 4 Kamari Lassiter CB; 22 Arthur Maulet CB; 5 Jalen Pitre SS; 34 Jaylen Reed S; 37 D'Angelo Ross CB; 30 Jaylin Smith CB; 11 Tremon Smith CB; 29 M. J. Stewart FS; 24 Derek Stingley Jr. CB; 25 Russ Yeast SS; Special teams (ST): 40 Austin Brinkman LS; 15 Kaʻimi Fairbairn K; 6 Tommy Townsend P	Reserve: 96 Denico Autry DE (PUP); 95 Derek Barnett DE (PUP); 77 Trent Brown RT (PUP); 3 Tank Dell WR (PUP); 91 Folorunso Fatukasi DT (PUP); 93 Kurt Hinish DT (PUP); 36 Alijah Huzzie CB (NF-Inj.); 28 Joe Mixon RB (NF-Inj.); 31 Dameon Pierce RB (PUP); 20 Jimmie Ward FS (PUP) 80 active, 10 reserve As of July 23, 2025. Rookies in italics.; Roster; Depth chart; Transactions

=== Indianapolis Colts ===
Indianapolis Colts roster
Quarterbacks (QB): 12 Jason Bean WR; 17 Daniel Jones; 15 Riley Leonard; 5 Anthony Richardson; Running backs (RB): 36 Salvon Ahmed; 37 Ulysses Bentley IV; 21 DJ Giddens; 31 Tyler Goodson; 26 Khalil Herbert; 28 Jonathan Taylor; Wide receivers (WR): 9 Ajou Ajou; 1 Josh Downs; 16 Ashton Dulin; 6 Anthony Gould; 43 Tyler Kahmann; 10 Adonai Mitchell; 2 D. J. Montgomery; 3 Coleman Owen; 14 Alec Pierce; 8 Landon Parker; 11 Michael Pittman Jr.; 4 Blayne Taylor; 13 Laquon Treadwell; Tight ends (TE): 81 Mo Alie-Cox; 86 Will Mallory; 45 Maximilian Mang (IPP); 49 Sean McKeon; 85 Drew Ogletree; 83 Albert Okwuegbunam; 84 Tyler Warren; 80 Jelani Woods	Offensive linemen (OL): 60 Tanor Bortolini G; 64 Marshall Foerner T; 73 Blake Freeland T; 62 Wesley French C; 71 Matt Goncalves T; 56 Quenton Nelson G; 63 Danny Pinter C; 79 Bernhard Raimann T; 66 Josh Sills G; 72 Braden Smith T; 67 Luke Tenuta T; 75 Jalen Travis T; 68 Dalton Tucker G; 65 Mose Vavao C; Defensive linemen (DL): 95 Adetomiwa Adebawore DT; 99 DeForest Buckner DT; 61 Devonta Davis DT; 52 Samson Ebukam DE; 92 Neville Gallimore DT; 98 Eric Johnson DT; 55 Isaiah Land DE; 97 Laiatu Latu DE; 94 Tyquan Lewis DE; 78 Desmond Little DE; 74 Durell Nchami DE; 51 Kwity Paye DE; 93 Tim Smith DT; 90 Grover Stewart DT; 91 JT Tuimoloau DE; 69 Josh Tupou DT	Linebackers (LB): 58 Austin Ajiake LB; 47 Liam Anderson LB; 48 Joe Bachie LB; 57 Jaylon Carlies LB; 53 Solomon DeShields LB; 44 Zaire Franklin LB; 59 Cameron McGrone LB; 50 Segun Olubi LB; 54 Jacob Phillips OLB; Defensive backs (DB): 38 Corey Ballentine CB; 29 JuJu Brents CB; 0 Camryn Bynum S; 20 Nick Cross S; 35 Johnathan Edwards CB; 36 Alex Johnson CB; 40 Jaylon Jones CB; 34 David Long CB; 23 Kenny Moore II CB; 32 Daniel Scott S; 43 Ladarius Tennison S; 25 Rodney Thomas II S; 27 Justin Walley CB; 7 Charvarius Ward CB; 41 Trey Washington S; 30 Hunter Wohler DB; 33 Samuel Womack CB; Special teams (ST): 46 Luke Rhodes LS; 8 Rigoberto Sanchez P; 3 Spencer Shrader K; 48 Maddux Trujillo K	Reserve: 76 Jack Wilson T (IR) 90 active (1 exempt) As of July 19, 2025. Rookies in italics.; Roster; Depth chart; Transactions

=== Jacksonville Jaguars ===
Jacksonville Jaguars roster
Quarterbacks (QB): 19 Seth Henigan; 16 Trevor Lawrence; 14 Nick Mullens; 18 John Wolford; Running backs (RB): 36 LeQuint Allen; 4 Tank Bigsby; 1 Travis Etienne; 38 Ja'Quinden Jackson; 33 Bhayshul Tuten; Wide receivers (WR): 15 Chandler Brayboy; 17 Cam Camper; 5 Dyami Brown; 80 Joshua Cephus; 83 Trenton Irwin; 87 J. J. Jones; 88 Darius Lassiter; 10 Eli Pancol; 89 Louis Rees-Zammit (IPP); 13 Dorian Singer; 7 Brian Thomas Jr.; 81 Austin Trammell; 11 Parker Washington; Tight ends (TE): 49 Shawn Bowman; 43 John Copenhaver; 47 Patrick Herbert; 84 Hunter Long; 45 Quintin Morris; 86 Johnny Mundt; 85 Brenton Strange	Offensive linemen (OL): 76 Ezra Cleveland G; 78 Dennis Daley LT; 55 Chuma Edoga G; 79 Luke Fortner C; 62 Javon Foster T; 73 Robert Hainsey C; 77 Anton Harrison T; 74 Fred Johnson T; 72 Walker Little T; 65 Patrick Mekari G; 64 Wyatt Milum G; 60 Jonah Monheim C; 70 Cole Van Lanen G; 61 Sal Wormley G; Defensive linemen (DL): 91 Arik Armstead DE; 99 James Carpenter DT; 59 Myles Cole DE; 96 Ethan Downs DE; 95 B. J. Green DE; 52 DaVon Hamilton DT; 41 Josh Hines-Allen DE; 98 Jordan Jefferson DT; 93 Tyler Lacy DT; 67 Eli Mostaert DT; 90 Emmanuel Ogbah DE; 97 Keivie Rose DT; 58 Dawuane Smoot DE; 92 Danny Striggow DE; 44 Travon Walker DE	Linebackers (LB): 56 Yasir Abdullah OLB; 50 Branson Combs OLB; 54 Jack Kiser OLB; 0 Devin Lloyd OLB; 53 Jalen McLeod OLB; 51 Ventrell Miller MLB; 48 Chad Muma OLB; 23 Foyesade Oluokun MLB; Defensive backs (DB): 21 Christian Braswell CB; 30 Montaric Brown CB; 3 Tyson Campbell CB; 12 Travis Hunter CB/WR; 26 Antonio Johnson SS; 22 Jarrian Jones CB; 25 Rayuan Lane III S; 2 Jourdan Lewis CB; 34 Zech McPhearson CB; 37 Jabbar Muhammad CB; 29 Eric Murray S; 24 Deantre Prince CB; 27 Caleb Ransaw CB; 6 Darnell Savage FS; 32 Cam'Ron Silmon-Craig S; 35 Doneiko Slaughter CB; 20 Daniel Thomas SS; 40 Aydan White CB; 42 Andrew Wingard FS; Special teams (ST): 9 Logan Cooke P; 39 Cam Little K; 46 Ross Matiscik LS	Reserve: 57 Dennis Gardeck OLB (PUP); 75 Cooper Hodges G (PUP); 94 Maason Smith DT (PUP) 89 active (1 exempt), 1 reserve As of July 17, 2025. Rookies in italics.; Roster; Depth chart; Transactions

=== Tennessee Titans ===
Tennessee Titans roster
Quarterbacks (QB): 10 Brandon Allen; 15 Tim Boyle; 1 Cam Ward; Running backs (RB): 36 Julius Chestnut; 32 Jermar Jefferson; 24 Jordan Mims; 28 Kalel Mullings; 20 Tony Pollard; 2 Tyjae Spears; Wide receivers (WR): 5 Elic Ayomanor; 17 Chimere Dike; 19 Jha'Quan Jackson; 11 Van Jefferson; -- Ramel Keyton; 12 Mason Kinsey; 83 Matt Landers; 4 Tyler Lockett; 80 Bryce Oliver; 13 James Proche; 87 Xavier Restrepo; 0 Calvin Ridley; 82 T. J. Sheffield; Tight ends (TE): 86 Drake Dabney; 84 Gunnar Helm; 88 David Martin-Robinson; 89 Thomas Odukoya (IPP); 85 Chigoziem Okonkwo; 81 Josh Whyle	Offensive linemen (OL): 67 Chandler Brewer T; 78 Brandon Crenshaw-Dickson T; 71 Jaelyn Duncan T; 73 Blake Hance G; 66 Brenden Jaimes C; 55 JC Latham T; 62 Corey Levin G; 75 Dan Moore T; 60 Sam Mustipher C; 61 John Ojukwu T; 76 Andrew Rupcich G; 77 Peter Skoronski G; 64 Jackson Slater G; 72 Oli Udoh T; 70 Kevin Zeitler G; Defensive linemen (DL): 95 Philip Blidi DT; 94 Timmy Horne DT; 72 Cam Horsley NT; 69 Sebastian Joseph-Day DE; 97 James Lynch DE; 68 Devonte O'Malley DE; 76 Isaiah Raikes NT; 98 Jeffery Simmons DT; 93 T'Vondre Sweat NT; 96 Carlos Watkins DE	Linebackers (LB): 50 Cody Barton ILB; 58 Amari Burney ILB; 56 Desmond Evans OLB; 99 Ali Gaye OLB; 48 David Gbenda ILB; 51 Cedric Gray ILB; 92 Jaylen Harrell OLB; 57 Curtis Jacobs ILB; 45 Dre'Mont Jones OLB; 49 Arden Key OLB; 90 Titus Leo OLB; 7 Oluwafemi Oladejo OLB; 59 Anfernee Orji OLB; 41 Otis Reese ILB; 53 Jihad Ward OLB; 52 James Williams ILB; Defensive backs (DB): 39 Darrell Baker Jr. CB; 33 Kendell Brooks FS; 44 Mike Brown FS; 29 Jarvis Brownlee Jr. CB; 28 Jermari Harris CB; 26 Marcus Harris CB; 37 Amani Hooker SS; 32 Gabe Jeudy-Lally CB; 35 Jalen Kimber CB; 36 Clarence Lewis CB; 21 Roger McCreary CB; 42 Amani Oruwariye CB; 30 Mark Perry S; 40 Davion Ross S; 23 Kevin Winston Jr. S; 24 Julius Wood SS; 25 Xavier Woods FS; Special teams (ST): 46 Morgan Cox LS; 3 Johnny Hekker P; 6 Joey Slye K	Reserve: 16 Treylon Burks WR (Waived/injured); 79 Lloyd Cushenberry C (PUP); 8 Will Levis QB (IR); 38 L'Jarius Sneed CB (PUP) 90 active (1 exempt), 2 reserve As of July 28, 2025. Rookies in italics.; Roster; Depth chart; Transactions

== AFC West ==
=== Denver Broncos ===
Denver Broncos roster
Quarterbacks (QB): 4 Sam Ehlinger; 10 Bo Nix; 8 Jarrett Stidham; Running backs (RB): 28 Tyler Badie; 20 Michael Burton FB; 27 J. K. Dobbins; 23 Audric Estimé; 37 RJ Harvey; 38 Jaleel McLaughlin; 25 Blake Watson; Wide receivers (WR): 83 Michael Bandy; 13 Pat Bryant; 80 Joaquin Davis; 11 Troy Franklin; 89 Courtney Jackson; 19 Marvin Mims; 81 Jerjuan Newton; 39 Kyrese Rowan; 5 Trent Sherfield; 14 Courtland Sutton; 17 Devaughn Vele; Tight ends (TE): 45 Nate Adkins; 1 Evan Engram; 85 Lucas Krull; 84 Caleb Lohner; 86 Caden Prieskorn; 82 Adam Trautman	Offensive linemen (OL): 72 Garett Bolles LT; 70 Marques Cox LT; 73 Frank Crum LT; 54 Alex Forsyth C; 66 Nick Gargiulo RG; 69 Mike McGlinchey RT; 77 Quinn Meinerz RG; 68 Joe Michalski C; 63 Alex Palczewski RT; 79 Matt Peart LT; 74 Ben Powers LG; 78 Will Sherman RG; 76 Calvin Throckmorton LG; 71 Xavier Truss RT; 60 Luke Wattenberg C; 64 Clay Webb LG; Defensive linemen (DL): 99 Zach Allen DE; 98 John Franklin-Myers DE; 91 Matt Henningsen DE; 94 Jordan Jackson DE; 93 D. J. Jones DT; 95 Sai'vion Jones DE; 90 Jordan Miller NT; 97 Malcolm Roach DT; 96 Eyioma Uwazurike DE; 75 Kristian Williams DT	Linebackers (LB): 56 Levelle Bailey ILB; 15 Nik Bonitto OLB; 50 J. B. Brown ILB; 0 Jonathon Cooper OLB; 52 Jonah Elliss OLB; 53 Andrew Farmer OLB; 57 Dre Greenlaw ILB; 47 Karene Reid ILB; 51 Que Robinson OLB; 41 Drew Sanders ILB; 49 Alex Singleton ILB; 40 Justin Strnad ILB; 92 Dondrea Tillman OLB; 55 Jordan Turner ILB; 59 Johnny Walker Jr. OLB; Defensive backs (DB): 31 Kris Abrams-Draine CB; 12 Jahdae Barron CB; 42 Sam Franklin Jr. FS; 46 Mario Goodrich CB; 9 Talanoa Hufanga SS; 22 Brandon Jones FS; 26 Devon Key FS; 6 P. J. Locke SS; 27 Damarri Mathis CB; 29 Ja'Quan McMillian NB; 21 Riley Moss CB; 36 Quinton Newsome CB; 39 Joshua Pickett CB; 33 Jaden Robinson CB; 34 JL Skinner SS; 43 Keidron Smith SS; 2 Patrick Surtain II CB; 35 Reese Taylor CB; 32 Delarrin Turner-Yell FS; Special teams (ST): 16 Jeremy Crawshaw P (IPP); 48 Mitchell Fraboni LS; 3 Wil Lutz K	Reserve: 87 A. T. Perry WR (Active/PUP) 90 active (1 exempt) As of July 25, 2025. Rookies in italics.; Roster; Depth chart; Transactions

=== Kansas City Chiefs ===
Kansas City Chiefs roster
Quarterbacks (QB): 15 Patrick Mahomes; 17 Gardner Minshew; 19 Chris Oladokun; 14 Bailey Zappe; Running backs (RB): 29 Kareem Hunt; 25 Elijah Mitchell; 10 Isiah Pacheco; 30 Brashard Smith; 42 Carson Steele FB; 34 Elijah Young; Wide receivers (WR): 80 Elijhah Badger; 5 Marquise Brown; 89 Jason Brownlee; 84 Mac Dalena; 82 Jimmy Holiday; 24 Skyy Moore; 13 Hal Presley; 81 Nikko Remigio; 4 Rashee Rice; 11 Jalen Royals; 9 JuJu Smith-Schuster; 2 Tyquan Thornton; 1 Xavier Worthy; Tight ends (TE): 88 Jake Briningstool; 83 Noah Gray; 87 Travis Kelce; 45 Geor'quarius Spivey; 85 Robert Tonyan; 49 Tre Watson; 12 Jared Wiley	Offensive linemen (OL): 66 Mike Caliendo LG; 73 Dalton Cooper RT; 75 Ethan Driskell LT; 72 Chukwuebuka Godrick RT (IPP); 61 C. J. Hanson RG; 52 Creed Humphrey C; 68 Joey Lombard C; 77 Jaylon Moore LT; 64 Wanya Morris LT; 60 Hunter Nourzad C; 79 Esa Pole LT; 71 Josh Simmons LT; 65 Trey Smith RG; 76 Kingsley Suamataia LT; 74 Jawaan Taylor RT; Defensive linemen (DL): 91 Felix Anudike-Uzomah DE; 51 Mike Danna DE; 97 Ashton Gillotte DE; 94 Malik Herring DE; 93 Coziah Izzard DT; 95 Chris Jones DT; 56 George Karlaftis DE; 96 Fabien Lovett DT; 55 Omarr Norman-Lott DT; 90 Charles Omenihu DE; 69 Mike Pennel NT; 98 Janarius Robinson DE; 99 Jerry Tillery DT; 92 Marlon Tuipulotu DT	Linebackers (LB): 31 Jeffrey Bassa OLB; 32 Nick Bolton MLB; 54 Leo Chenal OLB; 48 Cole Christiansen OLB; 43 Jack Cochrane MLB; 50 Brandon George MLB; 44 Cam Jones OLB; 59 Cooper McDonald MLB; 23 Drue Tranquill OLB; Defensive backs (DB): 26 Deon Bush SS; 27 Chamarri Conner FS; 6 Bryan Cook FS; 40 Jacobe Covington S; 34 Mike Edwards SS; 21 Jaden Hicks SS; 13 Nazeeh Johnson CB; 38 Kevin Knowles CB; 22 Trent McDuffie CB; 25 Glendon Miller S; 30 Christian Roland-Wallace CB; 46 Darius Rush CB; 45 Eric Scott Jr. CB; 39 Melvin Smith CB; 35 Jaylen Watson CB; 2 Joshua Williams CB; 42 Major Williams S; 20 Nohl Williams CB; Special teams (ST): 14 Matt Araiza P; 7 Harrison Butker K; 47 Eddie Czaplicki P; 41 James Winchester LS	Reserve: 8 Kristian Fulton CB (PUP); 38 Keaontay Ingram RB (IR) 90 active (1 exempt), 1 reserve As of July 24, 2025. Rookies in italics.; Roster; Depth chart; Transactions

=== Las Vegas Raiders ===
Las Vegas Raiders roster
Quarterbacks (QB): 5 Cam Miller; 12 Aidan O'Connell; 7 Geno Smith; Running backs (RB): 35 Chris Collier; 2 Ashton Jeanty; 23 Dylan Laube; 28 Sincere McCormick; 31 Raheem Mostert; 3 Zamir White; Wide receivers (WR): 81 Alex Bachman; 18 Jack Bech; 13 Phillip Dorsett; 85 Ketron Jackson Jr.; 4 Shedrick Jackson; 17 Collin Johnson; 19 Tommy Mellott; 16 Jakobi Meyers; 15 Kyle Philips; 10 Dont'e Thornton; 1 Tre Tucker; 83 Seth Williams; Tight ends (TE): 89 Brock Bowers; 86 Pat Conroy; 84 Qadir Ismail; 87 Michael Mayer; 46 Carter Runyon; 88 Justin Shorter; 80 Ian Thomas	Offensive linemen (OL): 72 Gottlieb Ayedze LT; 65 Alex Cappa G; 70 Parker Clements RT; 71 Delmar Glaze RT; 60 Charles Grant RT; 64 Jarrod Hufford C; 56 Atonio Mafi G; 61 Jordan Meredith G; 74 Kolton Miller LT; 77 Thayer Munford RT; 66 Dylan Parham RG; 58 Jackson Powers-Johnson C; 67 Will Putnam C; 76 Caleb Rogers G; 78 Dalton Wagner RT; Defensive linemen (DL): 73 Tank Booker DT; 69 Adam Butler DT; 99 Andre Carter II DE; 93 Zachary Carter DT; 75 Keondre Coburn DT; 98 Maxx Crosby DE; 95 Leki Fotu DT; 91 Jahfari Harvey DE; 97 Tonka Hemingway DT; 59 Jah Joyner DE; 51 Malcolm Koonce DE; 96 Jonah Laulu DT; 68 Treven Ma'ae DT; 90 Ovie Oghoufo DE; 92 JJ Pegues DT; 49 Charles Snowden DE; 79 Laki Tasi DT (IPP); 9 Tyree Wilson DE	Linebackers (LB): 43 Michael Barrett MLB; 44 Tommy Eichenberg MLB; 53 Amari Gainer OLB; 42 Matt Jones MLB; 55 Cody Lindenberg MLB; 57 Germaine Pratt MLB; 52 Elandon Roberts MLB; 54 Jaylon Smith MLB; 45 Devin White OLB; Defensive backs (DB): 33 Jamal Adams FS; 0 Jakorian Bennett CB; 11 Jeremy Chinn SS; 38 Hudson Clark S; 34 Thomas Harper SS; 30 Darnay Holmes CB; 39 John Humphrey CB; 32 Lonnie Johnson Jr. S; 36 Kyu Blu Kelly CB; 20 Isaiah Pola-Mao FS; 26 Darien Porter CB; 25 Decamerion Richardson CB; 29 Chris Smith II SS; 22 Eric Stokes CB; 37 Trey Taylor FS; 41 Greedy Vance Jr. CB; 27 Sam Webb CB; 40 JT Woods S; Special teams (ST): 50 Jacob Bobenmoyer LS; 8 Daniel Carlson K; 6 AJ Cole P	90 active (1 exempt); As of July 22, 2025. Rookies in italics.: Roster; Depth chart; Transactions

=== Los Angeles Chargers ===
Los Angeles Chargers roster
Quarterbacks (QB): 4 Taylor Heinicke; 10 Justin Herbert; 5 Trey Lance; 13 DJ Uiagalelei; Running backs (RB): 8 Omarion Hampton; 22 Najee Harris; 28 Hassan Haskins; 31 Nyheim Hines; 44 Scott Matlock FB; 34 Jaret Patterson; 35 Raheim Sanders; 30 Kimani Vidal; Wide receivers (WR): 38 Dalevon Campbell; 12 Derius Davis; 87 Dez Fitzpatrick; 37 Luke Grimm; 9 Tre Harris; 27 JaQuae Jackson; 39 Jaylen Johnson; 1 Quentin Johnston; 84 KeAndre Lambert-Smith; 15 Ladd McConkey; 88 Jalen Reagor; 82 Brenden Rice; Tight ends (TE): 46 McCallan Castles; 83 Tyler Conklin; 89 Will Dissly; 42 Tucker Fisk; 86 Oronde Gadsden II; 41 Stevo Klotz; 49 Jordan Petaia (IPP)	Offensive linemen (OL): 76 Joe Alt RT; 61 Karsen Barnhart RG; 73 Mekhi Becton RG; 75 Bradley Bozeman C; 78 Andre James C; 77 Zion Johnson LG; 62 Nash Jones G; 63 Josh Kaltenberger C; 74 Ryan Nelson T; 79 Trey Pipkins RG; 68 Jamaree Salyer LG; 70 Rashawn Slater LT; 65 Corey Stewart RT; 71 Branson Taylor G; Defensive linemen (DL): 99 Jamaree Caldwell NT; 92 Justin Eboigbe DE; 94 TeRah Edwards NT; 69 Josh Fuga NT; 91 Da'Shawn Hand DE; 98 Christopher Hinton NT; 96 Naquan Jones DT; 93 Otito Ogbonnia NT; 90 Teair Tart NT	Linebackers (LB): 25 Junior Colson ILB; 48 Bud Dupree OLB; 43 Troy Dye ILB; 59 Kylan Guidry OLB; 0 Daiyan Henley ILB; 54 Kyle Kennard OLB; 52 Khalil Mack OLB; 56 Kana'i Mauga ILB; 57 Tre'Mon Morris-Brash OLB; 50 Caleb Murphy OLB; 6 Denzel Perryman ILB; 53 Del'Shawn Phillips ILB; 97 Garmon Randolph OLB; 45 Tuli Tuipulotu OLB; 58 Marlowe Wax ILB; Defensive backs (DB): 31 Trikweze Bridges S; 32 Alohi Gilman FS; 20 Cam Hart CB; 26 Donte Jackson CB; 3 Derwin James SS; 23 Tony Jefferson FS; 38 Emany Johnson S; 35 Jaylen Jones S; 33 Deane Leonard CB; 27 R. J. Mickens S; 2 Elijah Molden CB; 37 Jordan Oladokun CB; 49 Myles Purchase CB; 46 Nikko Reed CB; 39 Eric Rogers CB; 29 Tarheeb Still CB; 24 Benjamin St-Juste CB; 36 Ja'Sir Taylor CB; 40 Kendall Williamson S; Special teams (ST): 11 Cameron Dicker K; 47 Josh Harris LS; 16 J. K. Scott P	Reserve: 67 Savion Washington RT (PUP) 90 active (1 exempt), 1 reserve As of July 26, 2025. Rookies in italics.; Roster; Depth chart; Transactions

== See also ==
- List of current NFC team rosters
