= 2024 Miami Dolphins season =

59th season in franchise history

- Owner: Stephen M. Ross
- General manager: Chris Grier
- Head coach: Mike McDaniel
- Home stadium: Hard Rock Stadium

Results
- Record: 8–9
- Division place: 2nd AFC East
- Playoffs: Did not qualify
- Pro Bowlers: TE Jonnu Smith

Uniform
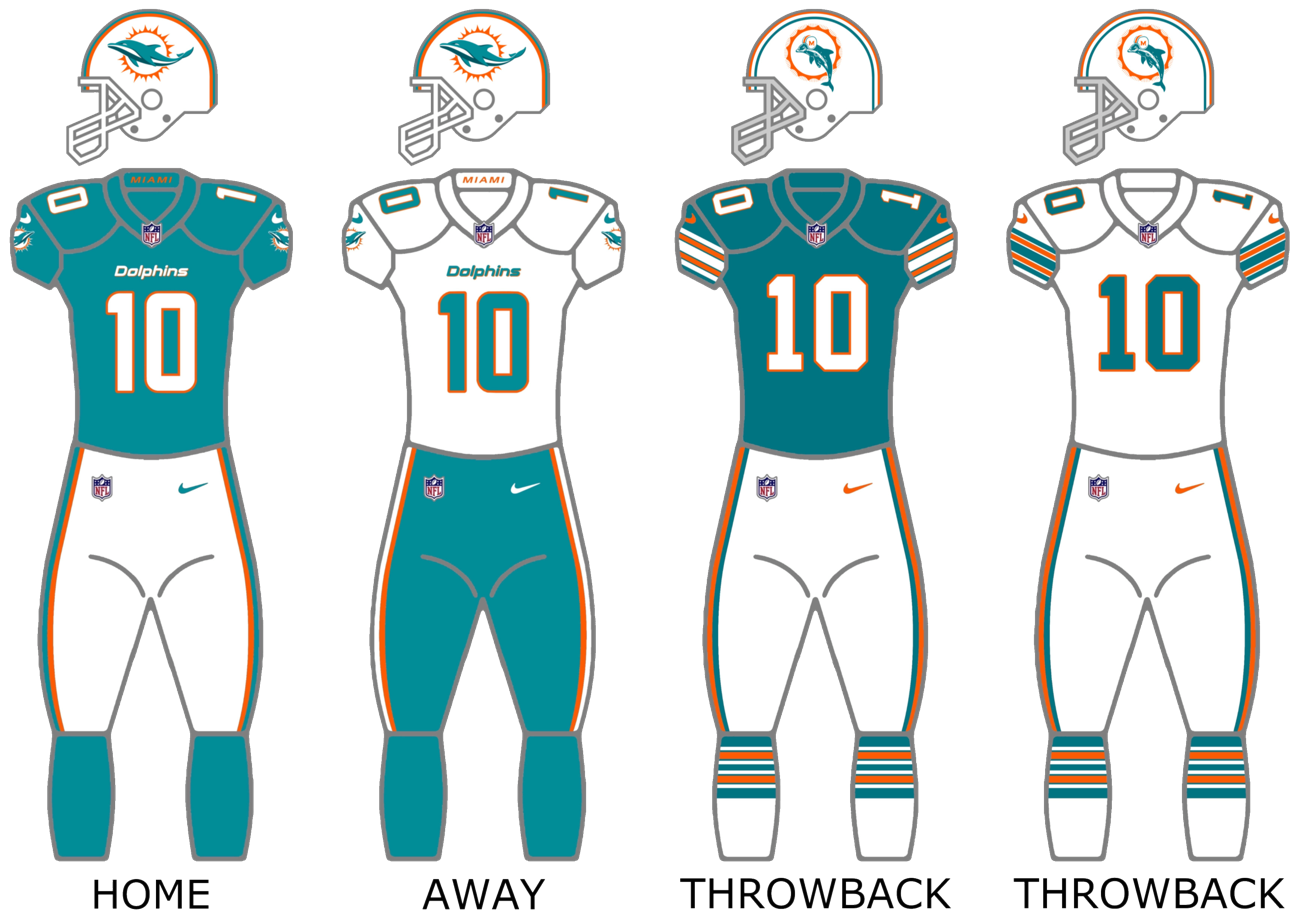

The 2024 season was the Miami Dolphins' 55th in the National Football League (NFL), their 59th overall, their ninth under general manager Chris Grier and their third under head coach Mike McDaniel. The Dolphins failed to improve on their 11–6 record from last year following a loss to the division rival Buffalo Bills in Week 9. They then guaranteed a worse record following a loss to the Green Bay Packers on Thanksgiving. The Dolphins failed to make the NFL playoffs for the first time in three seasons after the Denver Broncos defeated the Kansas City Chiefs in Week 18, extending their 23-year playoff victory drought which is the longest active drought in the NFL. The Dolphins also suffered their first losing season since 2019.

== Draft ==
2024 Miami Dolphins draft selections
| Round | Selection | Player | Position | College | Notes |
|---|---|---|---|---|---|
| 1 | 21 | Chop Robinson | OLB | Penn State | |
| 2 | 55 | Patrick Paul | OT | Houston | |
| 3 | – | Selection forfeited (Note: The Dolphins forfeited a third-round selection and a 2023 first-round selection for violating the league's anti-tampering policy in conversations with quarterback Tom Brady and the agent for then-New Orleans Saints' coach Sean Payton.) | | | |
| 4 | 120 | Jaylen Wright | RB | Tennessee | From Rams via Steelers and Eagles (Note: The Dolphins traded a 2025 third-round selection to the Philadelphia Eagles in exchange for a fourth-round selection (120th overall).) |
| 4 | 121 | Traded to the Denver Broncos (Note: The Dolphins traded a fourth-round selection (121st overall), a 2023 first-round selection and RB Chase Edmonds to the Denver Broncos in exchange for LB Bradley Chubb and a 2025 fifth-round selection.) | | | |
| 5 | 158 | Mohamed Kamara | OLB | Colorado State | |
| 6 | 184 | Malik Washington | WR | Virginia | From Bears (Note: The Dolphins traded G Dan Feeney to the Chicago Bears in exchange for a sixth-round selection (184th overall).) |
| 6 | 198 | Patrick McMorris | S | California | |
| 7 | 241 | Tahj Washington | WR | USC | |

Draft trades

2024 Miami Dolphins undrafted free agents
| Position | Player | College |
|---|---|---|
| WR | Je'Quan Burton | Florida Atlantic |
| CB | Storm Duck | Louisville |
| QB | Gavin Hardison | UTEP |
| CB | Isaiah Johnson | Syracuse |
| G | Matthew Jones | Ohio State |
| OT | Bayron Matos | South Florida* |
| G | Andrew Meyer | UTEP |
| OLB | Grayson Murphy | UCLA |
| S | Mark Perry | TCU |
| DE | Leonard Payne | Colorado |
| TE | Hayden Rucci | Wisconsin |

* Signed from the Dominican Republic as part of the International Player Pathway Program

== Personnel ==
=== Staff / Coaches ===
On January 24, 2024, the Dolphins and defensive coordinator Vic Fangio mutually agreed to part ways. He was later hired as the defensive coordinator for the eventual Super Bowl champion Philadelphia Eagles on January 27.

On February 3, 2024, the Dolphins named Ravens assistant head coach and defensive line coach Anthony Weaver as their new defensive coordinator.

2024 Miami Dolphins staff
| Front office: Chairman/managing general partner – Stephen Ross; Vice chairman/partner – Bruce Beal; Vice chairman – Jorge Pérez; Vice chairman – Matt Higgins; Vice chairman, president, and CEO – Tom Garfinkel; General manager – Chris Grier; Assistant general manager – Marvin Allen; Vice president, football administration – Brandon Shore; Senior vice president, chief financial officer – Chris Clements; Senior personnel executive – Reggie McKenzie; Co-director, player personnel – Adam Engroff; Co-director, player personnel – Anthony Hunt; Director of college scouting – Matt Winston; Senior scout – Jim Abrams; Special advisor to the vice chairman, president, and CEO – Dan Marino; Head coaches: Head coach – Mike McDaniel; Associate head coach/running backs – Eric Studesville; Assistant head coach/tight ends – Jon Embree; Offensive coaches: Offensive coordinator – Frank Smith; Quarterbacks/pass game coordinator – Darrell Bevell; Assistant quarterbacks – Chandler Henley; Wide receivers/pass game specialist – Wes Welker; Offensive line – Butch Barry; Assistant offensive line – Lemuel Jeanpierre; Offensive assistant – Parks Frazier; Offensive assistant – Jonathan Krause; Offensive assistant – Max McCaffrey; Offensive assistant – Roman Sapolu; Offensive assistant – Rob Everett | Defensive coaches: Defensive coordinator – Anthony Weaver; Defensive line – Austin Clark; Assistant defensive line – Kynjee Cotton; Linebackers/run game coordinator – Joe Barry; Outside linebackers – Ryan Crow; Pass game coordinator/secondary – Brian Duker; Cornerbacks – Mathieu Araujo; Defensive backs/pass game specialist – Ryan Slowik; Assistant defensive backs – DeShawn Shead; Defensive assistant – Matthew O'Donnell; Defensive assistant – Sean Ryan; Special teams coaches: Special teams coordinator – Danny Crossman; Senior special teams assistant – Ronnie Bradford; Strength and conditioning: Head strength and conditioning – Dave Puloka; Assistant strength and conditioning – Adam Lachance |

=== Final roster ===
2024 Miami Dolphins roster
| Quarterbacks (QB): 18 Tyler Huntley; 1 Tua Tagovailoa; Running backs (RB): 28 De'Von Achane; 30 Alec Ingold FB; 31 Raheem Mostert; 23 Jeff Wilson; 25 Jaylen Wright; Wide receivers (WR): 85 River Cracraft; 82 D'Wayne Eskridge; 84 Erik Ezukanma; 10 Tyreek Hill; 17 Jaylen Waddle; 83 Malik Washington; Tight ends (TE): 89 Julian Hill; 9 Jonnu Smith; 81 Durham Smythe; 80 Jack Stoll | Offensive linemen (OL): 72 Terron Armstead LT; 55 Aaron Brewer C; 76 Jackson Carman RT; 66 Braeden Daniels T; 74 Liam Eichenberg RG; 65 Robert Jones LG; 60 Andrew Meyer C; 52 Patrick Paul LT; 77 Isaiah Wynn LG; Defensive linemen (DL): 93 Calais Campbell DE; 98 Matt Dickerson DE; 90 Da'Shawn Hand DE; 95 Benito Jones NT; 92 Zach Sieler DE | Linebackers (LB): 56 Quinton Bell OLB; 20 Jordyn Brooks ILB; 11 Tyrel Dodson ILB; 53 Cameron Goode OLB; 50 Mohamed Kamara OLB; 91 Emmanuel Ogbah OLB; 45 Duke Riley ILB; 44 Chop Robinson OLB; 41 Channing Tindall ILB; 6 Anthony Walker Jr. ILB; Defensive backs (DB): 27 Ethan Bonner CB; 22 Elijah Campbell FS; 36 Storm Duck CB; 8 Jevon Holland FS; 4 Kader Kohou CB; 32 Patrick McMorris SS; 33 Siran Neal CB; 21 Jordan Poyer SS; 5 Jalen Ramsey CB; Special teams (ST): 16 Jake Bailey P; 47 Jake McQuaide LS; 7 Jason Sanders K | Practice squad: 86 Tarik Black WR; 58 Will Bradley-King OLB; 94 Shakel Brown DE; 34 Jordan Colbert SS; 97 Neil Farrell NT; 78 Ryan Hayes RT; 75 Chasen Hines G; 57 Dequan Jackson ILB; 37 Isaiah Johnson CB; 43 Jason Maitre CB; 79 Bayron Matos RT (IPP); 3 Isaiah McKenzie WR; 59 Derrick McLendon OLB; 40 Nik Needham CB; 35 Deneric Prince RB; 19 Skylar Thompson QB; Reserve: 0 Braxton Berrios WR (IR); 51 Tyus Bowser OLB (IR); 47 Cam Brown OLB (IR); 2 Bradley Chubb OLB (PUP); 80 Tanner Conner TE (IR); 88 Grant DuBose WR (IR); 48 Blake Ferguson LS (NF-Ill.); 29 Kendall Fuller CB (IR); 73 Austin Jackson RT (IR); 70 Kendall Lamm RT (IR); 59 Grayson Murphy OLB (IR); 15 Jaelan Phillips OLB (IR); 84 Anthony Schwartz WR (IR); 24 Cam Smith CB (IR); 71 Kion Smith RT (IR); 82 Tahj Washington WR (IR); Rookies in italics 53 active, 16 reserve, 15 practice squad (1 exempt) |

== Preseason ==
| Week | Date | Opponent | Result | Record | Venue | Recap |
|---|---|---|---|---|---|---|
| 1 | August 9 | Atlanta Falcons | W 20–13 | 1–0 | Hard Rock Stadium | Recap |
| 2 | August 17 | Washington Commanders | W 13–6 | 2–0 | Hard Rock Stadium | Recap |
| 3 | August 23 | at Tampa Bay Buccaneers | L 14–24 | 2–1 | Raymond James Stadium | Recap |

== Regular season ==
=== Schedule ===
| Week | Date | Opponent | Result | Record | Venue | Recap |
|---|---|---|---|---|---|---|
| 1 | September 8 | Jacksonville Jaguars | **W** 20–17 | 1–0 | Hard Rock Stadium | Recap |
| 2 | September 12 | **Buffalo Bills** | **L** 10–31 | 1–1 | Hard Rock Stadium | Recap |
| 3 | September 22 | at Seattle Seahawks | **L** 3–24 | 1–2 | Lumen Field | Recap |
| 4 | September 30 | Tennessee Titans | **L** 12–31 | 1–3 | Hard Rock Stadium | Recap |
| 5 | October 6 | at **New England Patriots** | **W** 15–10 | 2–3 | Gillette Stadium | Recap |
| 6 | Bye | | | | | |
| 7 | October 20 | at Indianapolis Colts | **L** 10–16 | 2–4 | Lucas Oil Stadium | Recap |
| 8 | October 27 | Arizona Cardinals | **L** 27–28 | 2–5 | Hard Rock Stadium | Recap |
| 9 | November 3 | at **Buffalo Bills** | **L** 27–30 | 2–6 | Highmark Stadium | Recap |
| 10 | November 11 | at Los Angeles Rams | **W** 23–15 | 3–6 | SoFi Stadium | Recap |
| 11 | November 17 | Las Vegas Raiders | **W** 34–19 | 4–6 | Hard Rock Stadium | Recap |
| 12 | November 24 | **New England Patriots** | **W** 34–15 | 5–6 | Hard Rock Stadium | Recap |
| 13 | November 28 | at Green Bay Packers | **L** 17–30 | 5–7 | Lambeau Field | Recap |
| 14 | December 8 | **New York Jets** | **W** 32–26 (OT) | 6–7 | Hard Rock Stadium | Recap |
| 15 | December 15 | at Houston Texans | **L** 12–20 | 6–8 | NRG Stadium | Recap |
| 16 | December 22 | San Francisco 49ers | **W** 29–17 | 7–8 | Hard Rock Stadium | Recap |
| 17 | December 29 | at Cleveland Browns | **W** 20–3 | 8–8 | Huntington Bank Field | Recap |
| 18 | January 5 | at **New York Jets** | **L** 20–32 | 8–9 | MetLife Stadium | Recap |

Note: Intra-division opponents are in bold text.

=== Game summaries ===
==== Week 1: vs. Jacksonville Jaguars ====
Week 1: Jacksonville Jaguars at Miami Dolphins – Game summary

| Quarter | 1 | 2 | 3 | 4 | Total |
|---|---|---|---|---|---|
| Jaguars | 7 | 10 | 0 | 0 | **17** |
| **Dolphins** | 0 | 7 | 7 | 6 | **20** |

at Hard Rock Stadium, Miami Gardens, Florida

- Date: September 8
- Game time: 1:00 p.m. EDT
- Game weather: Partly cloudy, 91 °F (33 °C)
- Game attendance: 65,582
- Referee: Craig Wrolstad
- TV announcers (CBS): Kevin Harlan, Trent Green and Melanie Collins
- Recap, Game Book

Game information

**First quarter**

- JAX – Travis Etienne 1-yard run (Cam Little kick), 4:31. Jaguars 7–0. **Drive: 9 plays, 96 yards, 3:18.**

**Second quarter**

- JAX – Brian Thomas Jr. 14-yard pass from Trevor Lawrence (Cam Little kick), 6:21. Jaguars 14–0. **Drive: 8 plays, 55 yards, 5:31.**
- MIA – De'Von Achane 1-yard run (Jason Sanders kick), 1:04. Jaguars 14–7. **Drive: 12 plays, 70 yards, 5:17.**
- JAX – Cam Little 53-yard field goal, 0:00. Jaguars 17–7. **Drive: 6 plays, 43 yards, 1:04.**

**Third quarter**

- MIA – Tyreek Hill 80-yard pass from Tua Tagovailoa (Jason Sanders kick), 2:08. Jaguars 17–14. **Drive: 1 play, 80 yards, 0:11.**

**Fourth quarter**

- MIA – Jason Sanders 37-yard field goal, 4:22. Tied 17–17. **Drive: 12 plays, 73 yards, 6:44.**
- MIA – Jason Sanders 52-yard field goal, 0:00. Dolphins 20–17. **Drive: 8 plays, 31 yards, 2:09.**

**Top passers**

- JAX – Trevor Lawrence – 12/21, 162 yards, TD
- MIA – Tua Tagovailoa – 23/37, 336 yards, TD

**Top rushers**

- JAX – Tank Bigsby – 12 rushes, 73 yards
- MIA – Jeff Wilson – 5 rushes, 26 yards

**Top receivers**

- JAX – Gabe Davis – 3 receptions, 62 yards
- MIA – Tyreek Hill – 7 receptions, 130 yards, TD

Despite receiver Tyreek Hill being detained by the police for speeding prior to the game, and the team falling behind 17–7 at halftime, the Dolphins rallied behind a strong performance from Hill to come back and win.

==== Week 2: vs. Buffalo Bills ====
Week 2: Buffalo Bills at Miami Dolphins – Game summary

| Quarter | 1 | 2 | 3 | 4 | Total |
|---|---|---|---|---|---|
| **Bills** | 7 | 17 | 7 | 0 | **31** |
| Dolphins | 7 | 3 | 0 | 0 | **10** |

at Hard Rock Stadium, Miami Gardens, Florida

- Date: September 12
- Game time: 8:15 p.m. EDT
- Game weather: Partly cloudy, 86 °F (30 °C)
- Game attendance: 65,601
- Referee: Bill Vinovich
- TV announcers (WFOR/Prime Video): Al Michaels, Kirk Herbstreit and Kaylee Hartung
- Recap, Game Book

Game information

**First quarter**

- BUF – James Cook 17-yard pass from Josh Allen (Tyler Bass kick), 9:49. Bills 7–0. **Drive: 6 plays, 37 yards, 2:27.**
- MIA – De'Von Achane 5-yard pass from Tua Tagovailoa (Jason Sanders kick), 3:21. Tied 7–7. **Drive: 10 plays, 70 yards, 6:28.**

**Second quarter**

- BUF – Tyler Bass 43-yard field goal, 12:41. Bills 10–7. **Drive: 7 plays, 19 yards, 3:00.**
- BUF – James Cook 1-yard run (Tyler Bass kick), 6:25. Bills 17–7. **Drive: 8 plays, 85 yards, 4:29.**
- BUF – James Cook 49-yard run (Tyler Bass kick), 3:36. Bills 24–7. **Drive: 1 play, 49 yards, 0:09.**
- MIA – Jason Sanders 34-yard field goal, 0:04. Bills 24–10. **Drive: 13 plays, 54 yards, 3:32.**

**Third quarter**

- BUF – Ja'Marcus Ingram 31-yard interception return (Tyler Bass kick), 9:24. Bills 31–10. **Drive: 5 plays, 19 yards, 2:43.**

**Fourth quarter**

- No scoring plays.

**Top passers**

- BUF – Josh Allen – 13/19, 139 yards, TD
- MIA – Tua Tagovailoa – 17/25, 145 yards, TD, 3 INT

**Top rushers**

- BUF – James Cook – 11 rushes, 78 yards, 2 TD
- MIA – De'Von Achane – 22 rushes, 96 yards

**Top receivers**

- BUF – Khalil Shakir – 5 receptions, 54 yards
- MIA – De'Von Achane – 7 receptions, 69 yards, TD

After a tight first quarter, the Dolphins could not contain Bills running back James Cook, who scored three total touchdowns, and were unable to come back, resulting in a 31–10 loss. Quarterback Tua Tagovailoa, who threw three interceptions in the game, including a pick-six to cornerback Ja'Marcus Ingram, suffered a concussion in the third quarter, which was his third concussion in less than 24 months.

==== Week 3: at Seattle Seahawks ====
Week 3: Miami Dolphins at Seattle Seahawks – Game summary

| Quarter | 1 | 2 | 3 | 4 | Total |
|---|---|---|---|---|---|
| Dolphins | 3 | 0 | 0 | 0 | **3** |
| **Seahawks** | 17 | 0 | 0 | 7 | **24** |

at Lumen Field, Seattle, Washington

- Date: September 22
- Game time: 4:05 p.m. EDT/1:05 p.m. PDT
- Game weather: Cloudy, 64 °F (18 °C)
- Game attendance: 68,658
- Referee: Land Clark
- TV announcers (CBS): Kevin Harlan, Trent Green and Melanie Collins
- Recap, Game Book

Game information

**First quarter**

- SEA – Jason Myers 56-yard field goal, 10:49. Seahawks 3–0. **Drive: 7 plays, 28 yards, 4:11.**
- SEA – Zach Charbonnet 4-yard run (Jason Myers kick), 6:44. Seahawks 10–0. **Drive: 5 plays, 53 yards, 1:53.**
- MIA – Jason Sanders 23-yard field goal, 0:11. Seahawks 10–3. **Drive: 4 plays, 2 yards, 2:10.**
- SEA – DK Metcalf 71-yard pass from Geno Smith (Jason Myers kick), 0:00. Seahawks 17–3. **Drive: 1 play, 71 yards, 0:11.**

**Second quarter**

- No scoring plays.

**Third quarter**

- No scoring plays.

**Fourth quarter**

- SEA – Zach Charbonnet 10-yard run (Jason Myers kick), 4:55. Seahawks 24–3. **Drive: 11 plays, 98 yards, 5:27.**

**Top passers**

- MIA – Skylar Thompson – 13/19, 107 yards
- SEA – Geno Smith – 26/34, 289 yards, TD, 2 INT

**Top rushers**

- MIA – De'Von Achane – 11 rushes, 30 yards
- SEA – Zach Charbonnet – 18 rushes, 91 yards, 2 TD

**Top receivers**

- MIA – Tyreek Hill – 3 receptions, 40 yards
- SEA – DK Metcalf – 4 receptions, 104 yards, TD

With Tagovailoa placed on injured reserve due to his concussion, Skylar Thompson made the start at quarterback for Miami, but he suffered a "painful" rib injury during the game and was replaced by third-string quarterback Tim Boyle. The Dolphins also lost other starters such as Kendall Fuller and Terron Armstead to injury during the 24–3 loss which dropped them to 1–2 on the season.

==== Week 4: vs. Tennessee Titans ====
Week 4: Tennessee Titans at Miami Dolphins – Game summary

| Quarter | 1 | 2 | 3 | 4 | Total |
|---|---|---|---|---|---|
| **Titans** | 0 | 9 | 10 | 12 | **31** |
| Dolphins | 0 | 3 | 3 | 6 | **12** |

at Hard Rock Stadium, Miami Gardens, Florida

- Date: September 30
- Game time: 7:30 p.m. EDT
- Game weather: Partly cloudy, 86 °F (30 °C)
- Game attendance: 65,291
- Referee: Clete Blakeman
- TV announcers (WFOR/ESPN): Chris Fowler, Louis Riddick, Dan Orlovsky and Laura Rutledge
- Recap, Game Book

Game information

**First quarter**

- No scoring plays.

**Second quarter**

- TEN – Nick Folk 53-yard field goal, 14:16. Titans 3–0. **Drive: 9 plays, 21 yards, 4:58.**
- TEN – Nick Folk 52-yard field goal, 8:20. Titans 6–0. **Drive: 8 plays, 19 yards, 4:01.**
- MIA – Jason Sanders 44-yard field goal, 4:13. Titans 6–3. **Drive: 10 plays, 44 yards, 4:07.**
- TEN – Nick Folk 47-yard field goal, 0:00. Titans 9–3. **Drive: 3 plays, 27 yards, 0:16.**

**Third quarter**

- MIA – Jason Sanders 56-yard field goal, 9:02. Titans 9–6. **Drive: 5 plays, 10 yards, 2:38.**
- TEN – Tyjae Spears 7-yard run (Nick Folk kick), 6:00. Titans 16–6. **Drive: 5 plays, 70 yards, 3:02.**
- TEN – Nick Folk 51-yard field goal, 0:36. Titans 19–6. **Drive: 6 plays, 11 yards, 3:44.**

**Fourth quarter**

- TEN – Nick Folk 29-yard field goal, 10:45. Titans 22–6. **Drive: 8 plays, 27 yards, 3:23.**
- MIA – Tyler Huntley 1-yard run (pass failed), 3:36. Titans 22–12. **Drive: 11 plays, 70 yards, 7:09.**
- TEN – Penalty on Tyler Huntley enforced in the end zone for a safety, 2:27. Titans 24–12.
- TEN – Tony Pollard 4-yard run (Nick Folk kick), 0:24. Titans 31–12. **Drive: 4 plays, 10 yards, 2:03.**

**Top passers**

- TEN – Mason Rudolph – 9/17, 85 yards
- MIA – Tyler Huntley – 14/22, 96 yards

**Top rushers**

- TEN – Tony Pollard – 22 rushes, 88 yards, TD
- MIA – Tyler Huntley – 8 rushes, 40 yards, TD

**Top receivers**

- TEN – DeAndre Hopkins – 2 receptions, 31 yards
- MIA – Jaylen Waddle – 4 receptions, 36 yards

With the loss Dolphins dropped to 1–3 and suffered their second straight loss to Tennessee. It was their third loss to the Titans since 2021

==== Week 5: at New England Patriots ====
Week 5: Miami Dolphins at New England Patriots – Game summary

| Quarter | 1 | 2 | 3 | 4 | Total |
|---|---|---|---|---|---|
| **Dolphins** | 3 | 0 | 6 | 6 | **15** |
| Patriots | 7 | 0 | 3 | 0 | **10** |

at Gillette Stadium, Foxborough, Massachusetts

- Date: October 6
- Game time: 1:00 p.m. EDT
- Game weather: Sunny, 65 °F (18 °C)
- Game attendance: 64,628
- Referee: Adrian Hill
- TV announcers (Fox): Chris Myers, Mark Sanchez and Kristina Pink
- Recap, Game Book

Game information

**First quarter**

- MIA – Jason Sanders 54-yard field goal, 10:39. Dolphins 3–0. **Drive: 8 plays, 38 yards, 4:21.**
- NE – Rhamondre Stevenson 33-yard run (Joey Slye kick), 3:55. Patriots 7–3. **Drive: 4 plays, 43 yards, 2:16.**

**Second quarter**

- No scoring plays.

**Third quarter**

- NE – Joey Slye 38-yard field goal, 11:01. Patriots 10–3. **Drive: 10 plays, 50 yards, 3:59.**
- MIA – Jason Sanders 32-yard field goal, 7:47. Patriots 10–6. **Drive: 8 plays, 56 yards, 3:14.**
- MIA – Jason Sanders 47-yard field goal, 0:30. Patriots 10–9. **Drive: 9 plays, 57 yards, 5:15.**

**Fourth quarter**

- MIA – Alec Ingold 3-yard run (pass failed), 4:24. Dolphins 15–10. **Drive: 15 plays, 80 yards, 7:36.**

**Top passers**

- MIA – Tyler Huntley – 18/31, 194 yards, INT
- NE – Jacoby Brissett – 18/34, 160 yards

**Top rushers**

- MIA – Jaylen Wright – 13 rushes, 86 yards
- NE – Rhamondre Stevenson – 12 rushes, 89 yards, TD

**Top receivers**

- MIA – Tyreek Hill – 6 receptions, 69 yards
- NE – Demario Douglas – 6 receptions, 59 yards

With the win Miami improved to 2–3 while securing their third straight win over New England.

==== Week 7: at Indianapolis Colts ====
Week 7: Miami Dolphins at Indianapolis Colts – Game summary

| Quarter | 1 | 2 | 3 | 4 | Total |
|---|---|---|---|---|---|
| Dolphins | 7 | 3 | 0 | 0 | **10** |
| **Colts** | 0 | 3 | 7 | 6 | **16** |

at Lucas Oil Stadium, Indianapolis, Indiana

- Date: October 20
- Game time: 1:00 p.m. EDT
- Game weather: None (retractable roof closed)
- Game attendance: 66,299
- Referee: Craig Wrolstad
- TV announcers (Fox): Kevin Kugler, Daryl Johnston and Laura Okmin
- Recap, Game Book

Game information

**First quarter**

- MIA – Jonnu Smith 10-yard pass from Tyler Huntley (Jason Sanders kick), 5:56. Dolphins 7–0. **Drive: 11 plays, 58 yards, 5:51.**

**Second quarter**

- MIA – Jason Sanders 33-yard field goal, 0:22. Dolphins 10–0. **Drive: 9 plays, 65 yards, 2:30.**
- IND – Matt Gay 52-yard field goal, 0:00. Dolphins 10–3. **Drive: 4 plays, 36 yards, 0:22.**

**Third quarter**

- IND – Tyler Goodson 7-yard run (Matt Gay kick), 9:08. Tied 10–10. **Drive: 4 plays, 28 yards, 2:25.**

**Fourth quarter**

- IND – Matt Gay 22-yard field goal, 8:41. Colts 13–10. **Drive: 12 plays, 69 yards, 6:37.**
- IND – Matt Gay 38-yard field goal, 1:51. Colts 16–10. **Drive: 9 plays, 36 yards, 3:23.**

**Top passers**

- MIA – Tyler Huntley – 7/13, 87 yards, TD
- IND – Anthony Richardson – 10/24, 129 yards

**Top rushers**

- MIA – De'Von Achane – 15 rushes, 77 yards
- IND – Anthony Richardson – 14 rushes, 56 yards

**Top receivers**

- MIA – Jonnu Smith – 7 receptions, 96 yards, TD
- IND – Michael Pittman Jr. – 3 receptions, 63 yards

==== Week 8: vs. Arizona Cardinals ====
Week 8: Arizona Cardinals at Miami Dolphins – Game summary

| Quarter | 1 | 2 | 3 | 4 | Total |
|---|---|---|---|---|---|
| **Cardinals** | 0 | 7 | 11 | 10 | **28** |
| Dolphins | 10 | 3 | 7 | 7 | **27** |

at Hard Rock Stadium, Miami Gardens, Florida

- Date: October 27
- Game time: 1:00 p.m. EDT
- Game weather: Partly cloudy, 82 °F (28 °C)
- Game attendance: 65,629
- Referee: Clay Martin
- TV announcers (Fox): Jason Benetti, Mark Schlereth and Jen Hale
- Recap, Game Book

Game information

**First quarter**

- MIA – Raheem Mostert 1-yard run (Jason Sanders kick), 10:15. Dolphins 7–0. **Drive: 10 plays, 64 yards, 4:45.**
- MIA – Jason Sanders 53-yard field goal, 1:16. Dolphins 10–0. **Drive: 12 plays, 40 yards, 8:01.**

**Second quarter**

- ARI – Michael Wilson 6-yard pass from Kyler Murray (Chad Ryland kick), 11:28. Dolphins 10–7. **Drive: 9 plays, 70 yards, 4:48.**
- MIA – Jason Sanders 25-yard field goal, 0:15. Dolphins 13–7. **Drive: 13 plays, 88 yards, 3:27.**

**Third quarter**

- ARI – Chad Ryland 57-yard field goal, 11:43. Dolphins 13–10. **Drive: 5 plays, 32 yards, 3:17.**
- MIA – De'Von Achane 12-yard pass from Tua Tagovailoa (Jason Sanders kick), 8:31. Dolphins 20–10. **Drive: 6 plays, 70 yards, 3:12.**
- ARI – Tua Tagovailoa fumble out of bounds in the end zone for a safety, 6:15. Dolphins 20–12.
- ARI – Marvin Harrison Jr. 22-yard pass from Kyler Murray (run failed), 2:08. Dolphins 20–18. **Drive: 9 plays, 75 yards, 4:07.**

**Fourth quarter**

- MIA – Raheem Mostert 6-yard run (Jason Sanders kick), 12:22. Dolphins 27–18. **Drive: 9 plays, 70 yards, 4:46.**
- ARI – James Conner 2-yard run (Chad Ryland kick), 8:47. Dolphins 27–25. **Drive: 8 plays, 70 yards, 3:35.**
- ARI – Chad Ryland 34-yard field goal, 0:00. Cardinals 28–27. **Drive: 13 plays, 73 yards, 5:01.**

**Top passers**

- ARI – Kyler Murray – 26/36, 307 yards, 2 TD
- MIA – Tua Tagovailoa – 28/38, 234 yards, TD

**Top rushers**

- ARI – James Conner – 20 rushes, 53 yards, TD
- MIA – De'Von Achane – 10 rushes, 97 yards

**Top receivers**

- ARI – Trey McBride – 9 receptions, 124 yards
- MIA – Tyreek Hill – 6 receptions, 72 yards

Despite a 20–10 lead midway through the 3rd quarter and a 27–18 lead in the 4th quarter, the Dolphins could not hold on and lost 28–27 to the Cardinals.

==== Week 9: at Buffalo Bills ====
Week 9: Miami Dolphins at Buffalo Bills – Game summary

| Quarter | 1 | 2 | 3 | 4 | Total |
|---|---|---|---|---|---|
| Dolphins | 3 | 7 | 3 | 14 | **27** |
| **Bills** | 3 | 3 | 14 | 10 | **30** |

at Highmark Stadium, Orchard Park, New York

- Date: November 3
- Game time: 1:00 p.m. EST
- Game weather: Sunny, 54 °F (12 °C)
- Game attendance: 70,862
- Referee: Tra Blake
- TV announcers (CBS): Kevin Harlan, Trent Green and Melanie Collins
- Recap, Game Book

Game information

**First quarter**

- BUF – Tyler Bass 40-yard field goal, 6:30. Bills 3–0. **Drive: 7 plays, 15 yards, 3:57.**
- MIA – Jason Sanders 39-yard field goal, 1:19. Tied 3–3. **Drive: 9 plays, 49 yards, 5:11.**

**Second quarter**

- MIA – De'Von Achane 14-yard pass from Tua Tagovailoa (Jason Sanders kick), 3:20. Dolphins 10–3. **Drive: 14 plays, 97 yards, 8:21.**
- BUF – Tyler Bass 49-yard field goal, 0:07. Dolphins 10–6. **Drive: 12 plays, 39 yards, 3:13.**

**Third quarter**

- BUF – Mack Hollins 1-yard pass from Josh Allen (kick failed, wide left), 7:20. Bills 12–10. **Drive: 11 plays, 64 yards, 6:23.**
- MIA – Jason Sanders 23-yard field goal, 2:59. Dolphins 13–12. **Drive: 9 plays, 65 yards, 4:21.**
- BUF – Ray Davis 63-yard pass from Josh Allen (Josh Allen–Keon Coleman pass), 2:07. Bills 20–13. **Drive: 2 plays, 70 yards, 0:52.**

**Fourth quarter**

- MIA – De'Von Achane 8-yard run (Jason Sanders kick), 12:14. Tied 20–20. **Drive: 9 plays, 70 yards, 4:53.**
- BUF – Quintin Morris 2-yard pass from Josh Allen (Tyler Bass kick), 6:18. Bills 27–20. **Drive: 10 plays, 70 yards, 5:56.**
- MIA – Jaylen Waddle 7-yard pass from Tua Tagovailoa (Jason Sanders kick), 1:38. Tied 27–27. **Drive: 11 plays, 81 yards, 4:40.**
- BUF – Tyler Bass 61-yard field goal, 0:05. Bills 30–27. **Drive: 9 plays, 27 yards, 1:33.**

**Top passers**

- MIA – Tua Tagovailoa – 25/28, 231 yards, 2 TD
- BUF – Josh Allen – 25/39, 235 yards, 3 TD, INT

**Top rushers**

- MIA – De'Von Achane – 12 rushes, 63 yards, TD
- BUF – James Cook – 10 rushes, 44 yards

**Top receivers**

- MIA – Tyreek Hill – 4 receptions, 80 yards
- BUF – Ray Davis – 2 receptions, 70 yards, TD

With the loss the Dolphins were swept by Buffalo in back-to-back years.

==== Week 10: at Los Angeles Rams ====
Week 10: Miami Dolphins at Los Angeles Rams – Game summary

| Quarter | 1 | 2 | 3 | 4 | Total |
|---|---|---|---|---|---|
| **Dolphins** | 7 | 3 | 7 | 6 | **23** |
| Rams | 0 | 6 | 0 | 9 | **15** |

at SoFi Stadium, Inglewood, California

- Date: November 11
- Game time: 8:15 p.m. EST/5:15 p.m. PST
- Game weather: Clear, 60 °F (16 °C) (fixed roof)
- Game attendance: 72,474
- Referee: Ronald Torbert
- TV announcers (WFOR/ESPN): Joe Buck, Troy Aikman and Lisa Salters
- Recap, Game Book

Game information

**First quarter**

- MIA – Malik Washington 18-yard run (Jason Sanders kick), 12:01. Dolphins 7–0. **Drive: 5 plays, 70 yards, 2:59.**

**Second quarter**

- MIA – Jason Sanders 50-yard field goal, 14:07. Dolphins 10–0. **Drive: 5 plays, 22 yards, 1:54.**
- LAR – Joshua Karty 34-yard field goal, 5:46. Dolphins 10–3. **Drive: 6 plays, 20 yards, 1:51.**
- LAR – Joshua Karty 55-yard field goal, 0:00. Dolphins 10–6. **Drive: 11 plays, 54 yards, 2:13.**

**Third quarter**

- MIA – Tyreek Hill 1-yard pass from Tua Tagovailoa (Jason Sanders kick), 5:32. Dolphins 17–6. **Drive: 6 plays, 53 yards, 3:39.**

**Fourth quarter**

- LAR – Joshua Karty 53-yard field goal, 14:55. Dolphins 17–9. **Drive: 11 plays, 39 yards, 5:37.**
- MIA – Jason Sanders 37-yard field goal, 9:07. Dolphins 20–9. **Drive: 11 plays, 51 yards, 5:48.**
- LAR – Joshua Karty 22-yard field goal, 6:31. Dolphins 20–12. **Drive: 8 plays, 66 yards, 2:36.**
- MIA – Jason Sanders 50-yard field goal, 2:38. Dolphins 23–12. **Drive: 8 plays, 39 yards, 3:53.**
- LAR – Joshua Karty 31-yard field goal, 0:39. Dolphins 23–15. **Drive: 12 plays, 58 yards, 1:59.**

**Top passers**

- MIA – Tua Tagovailoa – 20/28, 207 yard, TD, INT
- LAR – Matthew Stafford – 32/46, 293 yards, INT

**Top rushers**

- MIA – De'Von Achane – 12 rushes, 37 yards
- LAR – Kyren Williams – 15 rushes, 62 yards

**Top receivers**

- MIA – Jaylen Waddle – 3 receptions, 57 yards
- LAR – Puka Nacua – 9 receptions, 98 yards

The Dolphins beat the Rams for the 5th straight meeting dating to a 42–10 loss in 2001.

==== Week 11: vs. Las Vegas Raiders ====
Week 11: Las Vegas Raiders at Miami Dolphins – Game summary

| Quarter | 1 | 2 | 3 | 4 | Total |
|---|---|---|---|---|---|
| Raiders | 3 | 3 | 6 | 7 | **19** |
| **Dolphins** | 7 | 3 | 7 | 17 | **34** |

at Hard Rock Stadium, Miami Gardens, Florida

- Date: November 17
- Game time: 1:00 p.m. EST
- Game weather: Cloudy, 80 °F (27 °C)
- Game attendance: 65,440
- Referee: John Hussey
- TV announcers (CBS): Tom McCarthy, Jay Feely, Ross Tucker and Tiffany Blackmon
- Recap, Game Book

Game information

**First quarter**

- MIA – Jonnu Smith 1-yard pass from Tua Tagovailoa (Jason Sanders kick), 6:47. Dolphins 7–0. **Drive: 14 plays, 70 yards, 8:13.**
- LV – Daniel Carlson 27-yard field goal, 0:08. Dolphins 7–3. **Drive: 12 plays, 61 yards, 6:39.**

**Second quarter**

- MIA – Jason Sanders 31-yard field goal, 6:46. Dolphins 10–3. **Drive: 16 plays, 52 yards, 8:22.**
- LV – Daniel Carlson 22-yard field goal, 0:45. Dolphins 10–6. **Drive: 16 plays, 66 yards, 6:01.**

**Third quarter**

- MIA – Tyreek Hill 8-yard pass from Tua Tagovailoa (Jason Sanders kick), 4:13. Dolphins 17–6. **Drive: 14 plays, 97 yards, 7:47.**
- LV – Brock Bowers 23-yard pass from Gardner Minshew (run failed), 1:21. Dolphins 17–12. **Drive: 8 plays, 70 yards, 2:52.**

**Fourth quarter**

- MIA – De'Von Achane 2-yard run (Jason Sanders kick), 10:37. Dolphins 24–12. **Drive: 10 plays, 60 yards, 5:44.**
- LV – Ameer Abdullah 10-yard pass from Gardner Minshew (Daniel Carlson kick), 4:23. Dolphins 24–19. **Drive: 14 plays, 70 yards, 6:14.**
- MIA – Jonnu Smith 57-yard pass from Tua Tagovailoa (Jason Sanders kick), 3:19. Dolphins 31–19. **Drive: 4 plays, 70 yards, 1:04.**
- MIA – Jason Sanders 46-yard field goal, 1:55. Dolphins 34–19. **Drive: 4 plays, 3 yards, 1:17.**

**Top passers**

- LV – Gardner Minshew – 30/43, 282 yards, 2 TD, INT
- MIA – Tua Tagovailoa – 28/36, 288 yards, 3 TD

**Top rushers**

- LV – Jakobi Meyers – 1 rush, 20 yards
- MIA – De'Von Achane – 17 rushes, 73 yards, TD

**Top receivers**

- LV – Brock Bowers – 13 receptions, 126 yards, TD
- MIA – Jonnu Smith – 6 receptions, 101 yards, 2 TD

==== Week 12: vs. New England Patriots ====
Week 12: New England Patriots at Miami Dolphins – Game summary

| Quarter | 1 | 2 | 3 | 4 | Total |
|---|---|---|---|---|---|
| Patriots | 0 | 0 | 0 | 15 | **15** |
| **Dolphins** | 0 | 24 | 7 | 3 | **34** |

at Hard Rock Stadium, Miami Gardens, Florida

- Date: November 24
- Game time: 1:00 p.m. EST
- Game weather: Sunny, 77 °F (25 °C)
- Game attendance: 65,479
- Referee: Alan Eck
- TV announcers (CBS): Spero Dedes, Adam Archuleta, and Aditi Kinkhabwala
- Recap, Game Book

Game information

**First quarter**

- No scoring plays.

**Second quarter**

- MIA – Jonnu Smith 7-yard pass from Tua Tagovailoa (Jason Sanders kick), 14:10. Dolphins 7–0. **Drive: 8 plays, 65 yards, 3:57.**
- MIA – De'Von Achane 9-yard pass from Tua Tagovailoa (Jason Sanders kick), 7:50. Dolphins 14–0. **Drive: 9 plays, 66 yards, 4:47.**
- MIA – De'Von Achane 11-yard pass from Tua Tagovailoa (Jason Sanders kick), 1:50. Dolphins 21–0. **Drive: 10 plays, 80 yards, 4:13.**
- MIA – Jason Sanders 21-yard field goal, 0:02. Dolphins 24–0. **Drive: 7 plays, 56 yards, 1:26.**

**Third quarter**

- MIA – Jaylen Waddle 23-yard pass from Tua Tagovailoa (Jason Sanders kick), 1:37. Dolphins 31–0. **Drive: 2 plays, 25 yards, 0:42.**

**Fourth quarter**

- NE – Austin Hooper 38-yard pass from Drake Maye (Joey Slye kick), 13:43. Dolphins 31–7. **Drive: 8 plays, 70 yards, 2:54.**
- NE – Christian Gonzalez 63-yard fumble return (Drake Maye–Rhamondre Stevenson pass), 10:10. Dolphins 31–15.
- MIA – Jason Sanders 51-yard field goal, 3:33. Dolphins 34–15. **Drive: 6 plays, 21 yards, 1:40.**

**Top passers**

- NE – Drake Maye – 22/37, 221 yards, TD, INT
- MIA – Tua Tagovailoa – 29/40, 317 yards, 4 TD

**Top rushers**

- NE – Antonio Gibson – 6 rushes, 30 yards
- MIA – De'Von Achane – 10 rushes, 32 yards

**Top receivers**

- NE – Demario Douglas – 5 receptions, 61 yards
- MIA – Jaylen Waddle – 8 receptions, 144 yards, TD

With the win, the Dolphins swept the Patriots for the second straight year and have now won 7 of the last 8 over New England since Week 15 of 2020.

==== Week 13: at Green Bay Packers ====
Thanksgiving Day games

Week 13: Miami Dolphins at Green Bay Packers – Game summary

| Quarter | 1 | 2 | 3 | 4 | Total |
|---|---|---|---|---|---|
| Dolphins | 0 | 3 | 8 | 6 | **17** |
| **Packers** | 14 | 10 | 3 | 3 | **30** |

at Lambeau Field, Green Bay, Wisconsin

- Date: November 28
- Game time: 8:20 p.m. EST/7:20 p.m. CST
- Game weather: Cloudy, 27 °F (−3 °C)
- Game attendance: 77,599
- Referee: Shawn Smith
- TV announcers (NBC): Mike Tirico, Jason Garrett and Melissa Stark
- Recap, Game Book

Game information

**First quarter**

- GB – Jayden Reed 3-yard pass from Jordan Love (Brandon McManus kick), 12:00. Packers 7–0. **Drive: 3 plays, 9 yards, 1:30.**
- GB – Josh Jacobs 1-yard run (Brandon McManus kick), 0:55. Packers 14–0. **Drive: 12 plays, 76 yards, 6:58.**

**Second quarter**

- MIA – Jason Sanders 33-yard field goal, 8:44. Packers 14–3. **Drive: 12 plays, 55 yards, 7:11.**
- GB – Jayden Reed 12-yard pass from Jordan Love (Brandon McManus kick), 1:36. Packers 21–3. **Drive: 6 plays, 62 yards, 1:27.**
- GB – Brandon McManus 46-yard field goal, 0:00. Packers 24–3. **Drive: 4 plays, 34 yards, 0:22.**

**Third quarter**

- GB – Brandon McManus 24-yard field goal, 7:24. Packers 27–3. **Drive: 8 plays, 72 yards, 5:10.**
- MIA – De'Von Achane 14-yard pass from Tua Tagovailoa (Tua Tagovailoa–Jaylen Waddle pass), 2:43. Packers 27–11. **Drive: 8 plays, 70 yards, 4:59.**

**Fourth quarter**

- GB – Brandon McManus 33-yard field goal, 5:02. Packers 30–11. **Drive: 9 plays, 78 yards, 4:31.**
- MIA – Tyreek Hill 12-yard pass from Tua Tagovailoa (pass failed), 3:04. Packers 30–17. **Drive: 7 plays, 67 yards, 1:58.**

**Top passers**

- MIA – Tua Tagovailoa – 36/45, 357 yards, 2 TD
- GB – Jordan Love – 21/28, 274 yards, 2 TD

**Top rushers**

- MIA – Raheem Mostert – 5 rushes, 19 yards
- GB – Josh Jacobs – 19 rushes, 43 yards, TD

**Top receivers**

- MIA – Jonnu Smith – 10 receptions, 113 yards
- GB – Tucker Kraft – 6 receptions, 78 yards

This was the first time the Dolphins had played on Thanksgiving since 2006.

==== Week 14: vs. New York Jets ====
Week 14: New York Jets at Miami Dolphins – Game summary

| Quarter | 1 | 2 | 3 | 4 | OT | Total |
|---|---|---|---|---|---|---|
| Jets | 3 | 10 | 10 | 3 | 0 | **26** |
| **Dolphins** | 6 | 9 | 0 | 11 | 6 | **32** |

at Hard Rock Stadium, Miami Gardens, Florida

- Date: December 8
- Game time: 1:00 p.m. EST
- Game weather: Partly cloudy, 77 °F (25 °C)
- Game attendance: 65,787
- Referee: Shawn Hochuli
- TV announcers (CBS): Kevin Harlan, Trent Green and Melanie Collins
- Recap, Game Book

Game information

**First quarter**

- MIA – De'Von Achane 2-yard run (kick failed, wide left), 10:24. Dolphins 6–0. **Drive: 8 plays, 70 yards, 4:36.**
- NYJ – Anders Carlson 28-yard field goal, 5:19. Dolphins 6–3. **Drive: 11 plays, 60 yards, 5:05.**

**Second quarter**

- MIA – Jason Sanders 39-yard field goal, 14:53. Dolphins 9–3. **Drive: 10 plays, 49 yards, 5:26.**
- NYJ – Isaiah Davis 17-yard run (Anders Carlson kick), 11:56. Jets 10–9. **Drive: 6 plays, 70 yards, 2:57.**
- MIA – Jason Sanders 24-yard field goal, 4:56. Dolphins 12–10. **Drive: 12 plays, 65 yards, 7:00.**
- NYJ – Anders Carlson 30-yard field goal, 0:49. Jets 13–12. **Drive: 11 plays, 58 yards, 4:07.**
- MIA – Jason Sanders 57-yard field goal, 0:02. Dolphins 15–13. **Drive: 5 plays, 31 yards, 0:47.**

**Third quarter**

- NYJ – Davante Adams 3-yard pass from Aaron Rodgers (Anders Carlson kick), 11:20. Jets 20–15. **Drive: 7 plays, 70 yards, 3:40.**
- NYJ – Anders Carlson 40-yard field goal, 1:02. Jets 23–15. **Drive: 14 plays, 58 yards, 7:49.**

**Fourth quarter**

- MIA – Tyreek Hill 4-yard pass from Tua Tagovailoa (Tua Tagovailoa–Jaylen Waddle pass), 9:04. Tied 23–23. **Drive: 9 plays, 60 yards, 4:19.**
- NYJ – Anders Carlson 42-yard field goal, 0:52. Jets 26–23. **Drive: 11 plays, 63 yards, 3:33.**
- MIA – Jason Sanders 52-yard field goal, 0:07. Tied 26–26. **Drive: 6 plays, 20 yards, 0:45.**

**Overtime**

- MIA – Jonnu Smith 10-yard pass from Tua Tagovailoa, 6:05. Dolphins 32–26. **Drive: 8 plays, 70 yards, 3:55.**

**Top passers**

- NYJ – Aaron Rodgers – 27/39, 339 yards, TD
- MIA – Tua Tagovailoa – 33/47, 331 yards, 2 TD

**Top rushers**

- NYJ – Braelon Allen – 11 rushes, 43 yards
- MIA – De'Von Achane – 14 rushes, 24 yards, TD

**Top receivers**

- NYJ – Garrett Wilson – 7 receptions, 114 yards
- MIA – Tyreek Hill – 10 receptions, 115 yards, TD

==== Week 15: at Houston Texans ====
Week 15: Miami Dolphins at Houston Texans – Game summary

| Quarter | 1 | 2 | 3 | 4 | Total |
|---|---|---|---|---|---|
| Dolphins | 0 | 6 | 6 | 0 | **12** |
| **Texans** | 3 | 10 | 7 | 0 | **20** |

at NRG Stadium, Houston, Texas

- Date: December 15
- Game time: 1:00 p.m. EST/12:00 p.m. CST
- Game weather: None (retractable roof closed)
- Game attendance: 71,221
- Referee: Alex Kemp
- TV announcers (CBS): Kevin Harlan, Trent Green and Melanie Collins
- Recap, Game Book

Game information

**First quarter**

- HOU – Kaʻimi Fairbairn 44-yard field goal, 7:09. Texans 3–0. **Drive: 8 plays, 55 yards, 4:11.**

**Second quarter**

- MIA – Jason Sanders 55-yard field goal, 11:35. Tied 3–3. **Drive: 12 plays, 45 yards, 7:40.**
- HOU – Nico Collins 6-yard pass from C. J. Stroud (Kaʻimi Fairbairn kick), 6:45. Texans 10–3. **Drive: 4 plays, 28 yards, 2:40.**
- MIA – Jason Sanders 36-yard field goal, 1:57. Texans 10–6. **Drive: 10 plays, 52 yards, 4:48.**
- HOU – Kaʻimi Fairbairn 23-yard field goal, 0:00. Texans 13–6. **Drive: 3 plays, 0 yards, 0:13.**

**Third quarter**

- HOU – Nico Collins 6-yard pass from C. J. Stroud (Ka'im Fairbairn kick), 11:02. Texans 20–6. **Drive: 9 plays, 70 yards, 3:58.**
- MIA – Jonnu Smith 7-yard pass from Tua Tagovailoa (kick failed, wide left), 4:30. Texans 20–12. **Drive: 11 plays, 73 yards, 6:32.**

**Fourth quarter**

- No scoring plays.

**Top passers**

- MIA – Tua Tagovailoa – 29/40, 196 yards, TD, 3 INT
- HOU – C. J. Stroud – 18/26, 131 yards, 2 TD

**Top rushers**

- MIA – De'Von Achane – 12 rushes, 41 yards
- HOU – Dare Ogunbowale – 1 rush, 35 yards

**Top receivers**

- MIA – Malik Washington – 5 receptions, 52 yards
- HOU – Joe Mixon – 5 receptions, 33 yards

The Dolphins fell to 0–5 all time against the Texans in Houston, having not won in Houston since a 23–20 win over the Houston Oilers in 1996.

==== Week 16: vs. San Francisco 49ers ====
Week 16: San Francisco 49ers at Miami Dolphins – Game summary

| Quarter | 1 | 2 | 3 | 4 | Total |
|---|---|---|---|---|---|
| 49ers | 0 | 10 | 0 | 7 | **17** |
| **Dolphins** | 3 | 10 | 6 | 10 | **29** |

at Hard Rock Stadium, Miami Gardens, Florida

- Date: December 22
- Game time: 4:25 p.m. EST
- Game weather: Mostly cloudy, 73 °F (23 °C)
- Game attendance: 66,341
- Referee: Scott Novak
- TV announcers (CBS): Jim Nantz, Tony Romo and Tracy Wolfson
- Recap, Game Book

Game information

**First quarter**

- MIA – Jason Sanders 44-yard field goal, 3:30. Dolphins 3–0. **Drive: 8 plays, 44 yards, 4:00.**

**Second quarter**

- SF – Deebo Samuel 16-yard pass from Brock Purdy (Jake Moody kick), 14:14. 49ers 7–3. **Drive: 10 plays, 70 yards, 4:16.**
- MIA – Jason Sanders 38-yard field goal, 9:40. 49ers 7–6. **Drive: 11 plays, 49 yards, 4:34.**
- MIA – Tyreek Hill 3-yard pass from Tua Tagovailoa (Jason Sanders kick), 3:20. Dolphins 13–7. **Drive: 8 plays, 68 yards, 4:33.**
- SF – Jake Moody 21-yard field goal, 0:47. Dolphins 13–10. **Drive: 9 plays, 67 yards, 2:33.**

**Third quarter**

- MIA – Jason Sanders 54-yard field goal, 10:57. Dolphins 16–10. **Drive: 8 plays, 34 yards, 4:03.**
- MIA – Jason Sanders 33-yard field goal, 1:08. Dolphins 19–10. **Drive: 9 plays, 54 yards, 4:45.**

**Fourth quarter**

- SF – Eric Saubert 2-yard pass from Brock Purdy (Jake Moody kick), 12:02. Dolphins 19–17. **Drive: 9 plays, 60 yards, 4:06.**
- MIA – Jason Sanders 48-yard field goal, 2:10. Dolphins 22–17. **Drive: 7 plays, 41 yards, 4:27.**
- MIA – De'Von Achane 50-yard run (Jason Sanders kick), 1:36. Dolphins 29–17. **Drive: 3 plays, 62 yards, 0:20.**

**Top passers**

- SF – Brock Purdy – 26/40, 313 yards, 2 TD, INT
- MIA – Tua Tagovailoa – 22/34, 215 yards, TD

**Top rushers**

- SF – Brock Purdy – 4 rushes, 26 yards
- MIA – De'Von Achane – 17 rushes, 120 yards, TD

**Top receivers**

- SF – George Kittle – 8 receptions, 106 yards
- MIA – De'Von Achane – 6 receptions, 70 yards

==== Week 17: at Cleveland Browns ====
Week 17: Miami Dolphins at Cleveland Browns – Game summary

| Quarter | 1 | 2 | 3 | 4 | Total |
|---|---|---|---|---|---|
| **Dolphins** | 3 | 3 | 7 | 7 | **20** |
| Browns | 0 | 3 | 0 | 0 | **3** |

at Huntington Bank Field, Cleveland, Ohio

- Date: December 29
- Game time: 4:05 p.m. EST
- Game weather: Cloudy, 54 °F (12 °C)
- Game attendance: 67,942
- Referee: Ronald Torbert
- TV announcers (CBS): Andrew Catalon, Tiki Barber, Jason McCourty and A.J Ross
- Recap, Game Book

Game information

**First quarter**

- MIA – Jason Sanders 54-yard field goal, 5:46. Dolphins 3–0. **Drive: 7 plays, 26 yards, 3:39.**

**Second quarter**

- CLE – Dustin Hopkins 25-yard field goal, 13:26. Tied 3–3. **Drive: 14 plays, 66 yards, 7:20.**
- MIA – Jason Sanders 39-yard field goal, 0:00. Dolphins 6–3. **Drive: 5 plays, 41 yards, 0:40.**

**Third quarter**

- MIA – Tyler Huntley 13-yard run (Jason Sanders kick), 11:04. Dolphins 13–3. **Drive: 6 plays, 72 yards, 3:05.**

**Fourth quarter**

- MIA – Jonnu Smith 7-yard pass from Tyler Huntley (Jason Sanders kick), 3:38. Dolphins 20–3. **Drive: 4 plays, 21 yards, 0:18.**

**Top passers**

- MIA – Tyler Huntley – 22/26, 225 yards, TD
- CLE – Dorian Thompson-Robinson – 24/47, 170 yards, INT

**Top rushers**

- MIA – Tyler Huntley – 7 rushes, 52 yards, TD
- CLE – D'Onta Foreman – 13 rushes, 49 yards

**Top receivers**

- MIA – Tyreek Hill – 9 receptions, 105 yards
- CLE – Jerry Jeudy – 12 receptions, 94 yards

==== Week 18: at New York Jets ====
Week 18: Miami Dolphins at New York Jets – Game summary

| Quarter | 1 | 2 | 3 | 4 | Total |
|---|---|---|---|---|---|
| Dolphins | 6 | 0 | 0 | 14 | **20** |
| **Jets** | 0 | 15 | 3 | 14 | **32** |

at MetLife Stadium, East Rutherford, New Jersey

- Date: January 5
- Game time: 4:25 p.m. EST
- Game weather: Sunny, 34 °F (1 °C)
- Game attendance: 68,818
- Referee: Tra Blake
- TV announcers (Fox): Joe Davis, Greg Olsen and Pam Oliver
- Recap, Game Book

Game information

**First quarter**

- MIA – Jason Sanders 26-yard field goal, 11:46. Dolphins 3–0. **Drive: 4 plays, 7 yards, 1:18.**
- MIA – Jason Sanders 28-yard field goal, 0:00. Dolphins 6–0. **Drive: 9 plays, 76 yards, 5:00.**

**Second quarter**

- NYJ – Tyler Conklin 5-yard pass from Aaron Rodgers (Greg Joseph kick), 7:57. Jets 7–6. **Drive: 8 plays, 79 yards, 3:50.**
- NYJ – Allen Lazard 13-yard pass from Aaron Rodgers (Breece Hall 2-pt Conversion run), 0:59. Jets 15–6. **Drive: 3 plays, 39 yards, 0:48.**

**Third quarter**

- NYJ – Greg Joseph 20-yard field goal, 6:35. Jets 18–6. **Drive: 10 plays, 47 yards, 3:58.**

**Fourth quarter**

- MIA – De'Von Achane 15-yard run (Jason Sanders kick), 14:12. Jets 18–13. **Drive: 14 plays, 78 yards, 7:23.**
- NYJ – Davante Adams 4-yard pass from Aaron Rodgers (Greg Joseph kick), 10:24. Jets 25–13. **Drive: 7 plays, 70 yards, 3:48.**
- MIA – Jonnu Smith 4-yard pass from Tyler Huntley (Jason Sanders kick), 5:21. Jets 25–20. **Drive: 12 plays, 70 yards, 5:03.**
- NYJ – Breece Hall 6-yard pass from Aaron Rodgers (Greg Joseph kick), 2:30. Jets 32–20. **Drive: 9 plays, 70 yards, 2:51.**

**Top passers**

- MIA – Tyler Huntley – 25/41, 227 yards, TD, 2 INT
- NYJ – Aaron Rodgers – 23/36, 274 yards, 4 TD, INT

**Top rushers**

- MIA – De'Von Achane – 11 rushes, 121 yards, TD
- NYJ – Breece Hall – 12 rushes, 57 yards

**Top receivers**

- MIA – Jonnu Smith – 9 receptions, 56 yards, TD
- NYJ – Davante Adams – 6 receptions, 88 yards, TD

Even had the Dolphins won, the Broncos victory over the Chiefs would've still ensured the Dolphins were eliminated from playoff contention for the first time since 2021. The loss still prevented them from finishing with a winning record, as they secured their first losing record since 2019 by finishing 8–9.

=== Standings ===
==== Division ====
AFC East
| | W | L | T | PCT | DIV | CONF | PF | PA | STK |
|---|---|---|---|---|---|---|---|---|---|
| ^{(2)} Buffalo Bills | 13 | 4 | 0 | .765 | 5–1 | 9–3 | 525 | 368 | L1 |
| Miami Dolphins | 8 | 9 | 0 | .471 | 3–3 | 6–6 | 345 | 364 | L1 |
| New York Jets | 5 | 12 | 0 | .294 | 2–4 | 5–7 | 338 | 404 | W1 |
| New England Patriots | 4 | 13 | 0 | .235 | 2–4 | 3–9 | 289 | 417 | W1 |

==== Conference ====
AFC
| Seed | Team | Division | W | L | T | PCT | DIV | CONF | SOS | SOV | STK |
|---|---|---|---|---|---|---|---|---|---|---|---|
**Division leaders**
| 1 | Kansas City Chiefs | West | 15 | 2 | 0 | .882 | 5–1 | 10–2 | .488 | .463 | L1 |
| 2 | Buffalo Bills | East | 13 | 4 | 0 | .765 | 5–1 | 9–3 | .467 | .448 | L1 |
| 3 | Baltimore Ravens | North | 12 | 5 | 0 | .706 | 4–2 | 8–4 | .529 | .525 | W4 |
| 4 | Houston Texans | South | 10 | 7 | 0 | .588 | 5–1 | 8–4 | .481 | .376 | W1 |
**Wild cards**
| 5 | Los Angeles Chargers | West | 11 | 6 | 0 | .647 | 4–2 | 8–4 | .467 | .348 | W3 |
| 6 (Note: Pittsburgh clinched the #6 seed over Denver based on head-to-head victory.) | Pittsburgh Steelers | North | 10 | 7 | 0 | .588 | 3–3 | 7–5 | .502 | .453 | L4 |
| 7 | Denver Broncos | West | 10 | 7 | 0 | .588 | 3–3 | 6–6 | .502 | .394 | W1 |
**Did not qualify for the postseason**
| 8 | Cincinnati Bengals | North | 9 | 8 | 0 | .529 | 3–3 | 6–6 | .478 | .314 | W5 |
| 9 (Note: Indianapolis finished ahead of Miami based on head-to-head victory.) | Indianapolis Colts | South | 8 | 9 | 0 | .471 | 3–3 | 7–5 | .457 | .309 | W1 |
| 10 | Miami Dolphins | East | 8 | 9 | 0 | .471 | 3–3 | 6–6 | .419 | .294 | L1 |
| 11 | New York Jets | East | 5 | 12 | 0 | .294 | 2–4 | 5–7 | .495 | .341 | W1 |
| 12 (Note: Jacksonville finished ahead of New England and Las Vegas based on conference record. (Jacksonville 4–8 to New England 3–9 to Las Vegas 3–9)) | Jacksonville Jaguars | South | 4 | 13 | 0 | .235 | 3–3 | 4–8 | .478 | .265 | L1 |
| 13 (Note: New England finished ahead of Las Vegas based on strength of victory. (New England .471 to Las Vegas .353)) | New England Patriots | East | 4 | 13 | 0 | .235 | 2–4 | 3–9 | .471 | .471 | W1 |
| 14 | Las Vegas Raiders | West | 4 | 13 | 0 | .235 | 0–6 | 3–9 | .540 | .353 | L1 |
| 15 (Note: Cleveland finished ahead of Tennessee based on strength of victory. (Cleveland .510 to Tennessee .431)) | Cleveland Browns | North | 3 | 14 | 0 | .176 | 2–4 | 3–9 | .536 | .510 | L6 |
| 16 | Tennessee Titans | South | 3 | 14 | 0 | .176 | 1–5 | 3–9 | .522 | .431 | L6 |
