= Lorenzo Dow Thompson =

Lorenzo Dow Thompson may refer to:

- Lorenzo Dow Thompson (treasurer) (1873–1951), State Treasurer of Missouri
- Lorenzo Dow Thompson (legislator) (c. 1810 – 1875), member of the Missouri House of Representatives
