= Gabriel Murphy =

American football player (born 2000)

No. 59
- Position: Linebacker

Personal information
- Born: October 13, 2000 (age 26); Dallas, Texas, U.S.
- Listed height: 6 ft 2 in (1.88 m)
- Listed weight: 251 lb (114 kg)

Career information
- High school: Bishop Lynch (Dallas)
- College: North Texas (2019–2021); UCLA (2022–2023)
- NFL draft: 2024: undrafted

Career history
- Minnesota Vikings (2024–2025); DC Defenders (2026)*
- * Offseason or practice squad member only

Career NFL statistics as of Week 2, 2025
- Total tackles: 1
- Stats at Pro Football Reference

Gabriel Murphy (born October 13, 2000) is an American former professional football player who was a linebacker in the National Football League (NFL). He played college football for the North Texas Mean Green and the UCLA Bruins.

== Early life ==
Murphy attended Bishop Lynch High School in Dallas, Texas. He committed to the University of North Texas to play college football.

== College career ==
Murphy played for the Mean Green from 2019 to 2021 as a linebacker and defensive end. In three years he started 15 of 24 games, recording 73 tackles and 12 sacks. After the 2021 season, he entered the transfer portal.

Murphy transferred to the University of California, Los Angeles (UCLA). In his first year with the Bruins in 2022, he started all 13 games and had 38 tackles and 1.5 sacks. In 2023, he again started all 13 games and had 38 tackles and eight sacks.

== Professional career ==
Pre-draft measurables
Height	Weight	Arm length	Hand span	Wingspan	40-yard dash	10-yard split	20-yard split	20-yard shuttle	Three-cone drill	Vertical jump	Broad jump	Bench press
6 ft 2 3/8 in (1.89 m)	247 lb (112 kg)	30 1/2 in (0.77 m)	9 1/4 in (0.23 m)	6 ft 3 in (1.91 m)	4.68 s	1.59 s	2.70 s	4.31 s	7.11 s	39.5 in (1.00 m)	10 ft 3 in (3.12 m)	25 reps
All values from NFL Combine/Pro Day

Murphy signed with the Minnesota Vikings as an undrafted free agent on April 27, 2024. He was also selected by the San Antonio Brahmas in the second round of the 2024 UFL draft on July 17. He was placed on injured reserve on August 27 to begin the season. He was activated on November 26, but waived the next day and subsequently signed to the practice squad. He signed a reserve/future contract on January 16, 2025.

On August 26, 2025, Murphy was waived by the Vikings as part of final roster cuts. He was signed to the practice squad the next day.

== Personal life ==
Murphy's identical twin, Grayson, played with him at North Texas and UCLA, and currently plays for the Miami Dolphins.
