= Zachary Carter =

Zachary Carter may refer to:

- Zachary Carter (American football), American footballer (born 1997)
- Zachary Carter (cricketer), Barbadian cricketer (born 2006)
- Zachary W. Carter, American lawyer (born 1950)
