= Andrew Meyer =

American football player (born 2000)

No. 60 – Miami Dolphins
- Position: Center
- Roster status: Active

Personal information
- Born: January 14, 2000 (age 26); Escondido, California, U.S.
- Listed height: 6 ft 3 in (1.91 m)
- Listed weight: 290 lb (132 kg)

Career information
- High school: San Marcos (San Marcos, California)
- College: UTEP (2018–2023)
- NFL draft: 2024: undrafted

Career history
- Miami Dolphins (2024–present)

Awards and highlights
- First team All-CUSA (2023)

Career NFL statistics as of Week 17, 2025
- Games played: 1
- Stats at Pro Football Reference

Andrew Jeffrey Meyer (born January 14, 2000) is an American professional football center for the Miami Dolphins of the National Football League (NFL). He played college football for the UTEP Miners.

== Early life ==
Meyer was born on January 14, 2000, in Escondido, California. He attended San Marcos High School where he won three letters with the football team, helping the team compile a record of 24–11 in his three seasons. He played both on the offensive and defensive lines in his last two years and helped San Marcos win nine games as a senior before losing in the playoff quarterfinals. He graduated from San Marcos in 2018 and then enrolled at the University of Texas at El Paso (UTEP).

== College career ==
Meyer redshirted his freshman year at UTEP, 2018, and then played 11 games as a reserve for the UTEP Miners football team in 2019. He started all eight games in the 2020 season at center while being named honorable mention All-Conference USA and to the Rimington Award watchlist, an award for best center nationally. He started 12 games in 2021, then 11 of 12 games in 2022 while being named honorable mention all-conference. Entering his senior year, 2023, he was named to the Rimington Award preseason watchlist. He started all 12 games in 2023 and concluded his collegiate career having started 43 of 54 games played.

== Professional career ==
Pre-draft measurables
Height	Weight	Arm length	Hand span	Wingspan	40-yard dash	10-yard split	20-yard split	20-yard shuttle	Three-cone drill	Vertical jump	Broad jump	Bench press
6 ft 3 3/8 in (1.91 m)	295 lb (134 kg)	32 5/8 in (0.83 m)	9 1/4 in (0.23 m)	6 ft 7 3/8 in (2.02 m)	5.08 s	1.77 s	2.93 s	4.63 s	8.03 s	33.0 in (0.84 m)	9 ft 8 in (2.95 m)	28 reps
All values from Pro Day

After going unselected in the 2024 NFL draft, Meyer signed with the Miami Dolphins as an undrafted free agent, with a contract including $75,000 guaranteed. He was also selected in the eighth round (62nd overall) of the 2024 UFL draft by the Michigan Panthers. Meyer made the Dolphins' final roster, but did not make an appearance for the team during the regular season.

On August 27, 2025, Meyer was placed on injured reserve due to a triceps injury. He was activated on December 27, ahead of the team's Week 17 matchup against the Tampa Bay Buccaneers.
