= Tanner Conner =

American football player (born 1998)

No. 80 – New England Patriots
- Position: Tight end
- Roster status: Practice squad

Personal information
- Born: March 20, 1998 (age 28); Kent, Washington, U.S.
- Listed height: 6 ft 3 in (1.91 m)
- Listed weight: 232 lb (105 kg)

Career information
- High school: Kentridge (Kent)
- College: Idaho State (2016–2021)
- NFL draft: 2022: undrafted

Career history
- Miami Dolphins (2022–2025); New York Giants (2025)*; New England Patriots (2026–present)*
- * Offseason or practice squad member only

Awards and highlights
- First-team All-Big Sky (2020); Second-team All-Big Sky (2021)

Career NFL statistics as of 2026
- Receptions: 12
- Receiving yards: 107
- Stats at Pro Football Reference

Tanner Conner (born March 20, 1998) is an American professional football tight end for the New England Patriots of the National Football League (NFL). He played college football for the Idaho State Bengals.

== Early life ==
Conner grew up in Kent, Washington and attended Kentridge High School, where he played basketball and football and was a hurdler on the track team. As a senior, he won the state championship in the 300-meter hurdles. Conner was not originally recruited to play college football and committed to run track at Idaho State before receiving an offer to also play football at the school.

== College career ==
Conner redshirted his freshman football season at Idaho State. Conner was named honorable mention All-Big Sky Conference after finishing his redshirt sophomore season with 47 receptions for 792 yards and eight touchdowns. He was named first-team All-Big Sky. after catching 34 passes for 685 yards and three touchdowns as a redshirt junior. Conner entered his redshirt senior season as the 12th-most athletic player in college football on sportswriter Bruce Feldman's annual "Freaks List". He finished the season with 42 receptions for 735 yards with four touchdowns and was named second-team All-Big Sky. After the conclusion of his college career, Conner was invited to play in the 2022 East–West Shrine Bowl.

Conner also was a member of Idaho State's track and field team. He competed in the 110 meter hurdles, 100 meters, and the 4 × 100 meters relay during the outdoor season and the 60 meter hurdles and the 60 meters during indoor events.

== Professional career ==
Pre-draft measurables
Height	Weight	Arm length	Hand span	Wingspan	40-yard dash	10-yard split	20-yard split	20-yard shuttle	Three-cone drill	Vertical jump	Broad jump	Bench press
6 ft 3 in (1.91 m)	226 lb (103 kg)	31 7/8 in (0.81 m)	9 1/2 in (0.24 m)	6 ft 5 1/4 in (1.96 m)	4.50 s	1.61 s	2.60 s	4.41 s	7.15 s	39.0 in (0.99 m)	10 ft 7 in (3.23 m)	19 reps
All values from Pro Day

=== Miami Dolphins ===
Conner was signed by the Miami Dolphins as an undrafted free agent on April 30, 2022, shortly after the conclusion of the 2022 NFL draft. He made the Dolphins' initial 53-man roster out of training camp.

On August 29, 2023, Conner was waived by the Dolphins and re-signed to the practice squad. He signed a reserve/future contract with Miami on January 15, 2024.

On November 6, 2025, Conner was waived by the Dolphins, and re-signed to the practice squad. He was released by Miami on December 17.

=== New York Giants ===
On December 18, 2025, Conner was signed to the New York Giants' practice squad. He signed a reserve/future contract with New York on January 5, 2026. On August 30, Conner was waived by the Giants as a part of final roster cuts.

=== New England Patriots ===
On September 22, 2026, Conner signed with the New England Patriots' practice squad.

== Personal life ==
Conner's father, Andy, played college football at the University of Oregon.
