= Bayron Matos =

Dominican-American football player (born 2000)

Rhode Island Breakers
- Position: Offensive tackle
- Roster status: Unsigned draft pick

Personal information
- Born: December 8, 2000 (age 25); Santo Domingo, Dominican Republic
- Listed height: 6 ft 7 in (2.01 m)
- Listed weight: 334 lb (151 kg)

Career information
- High school: Hamilton Heights Christian (Chattanooga, Tennessee, U.S.)
- College: New Mexico (2019–2021); South Florida (2021–2022)
- NFL draft: 2024: undrafted

Career history
- Miami Dolphins (2024)*; Indianapolis Colts (2025)*; Rhode Island Breakers (2027-present)
- * Offseason or practice squad member only
- Stats at Pro Football Reference

Bayron Matos (born December 8, 2000) is a Dominican professional American football offensive tackle. After growing up in the Dominican Republic, he moved to the U.S. in high school and played basketball. He played college basketball for the New Mexico Lobos and South Florida Bulls from 2019–20 to 2021–22, before switching to football in 2022. He is a participant in the NFL's International Player Pathway Program (IPPP).

== Early life ==
Matos was born in Los Mina, Santo Domingo, Dominican Republic. He grew up playing baseball, the country's most popular sport, and was considered a talented pitcher and outfielder, being able to throw at speeds in the low 90s. He liked basketball, however, and so he gave up baseball and moved to the United States at age 16 to pursue a professional basketball career. Matos played against Wander Franco and he credits the brother of Manuel Margot for teaching him the game of baseball.

Matos moved to Chattanooga, Tennessee, and began attending Hamilton Heights Christian Academy, but initially spoke no English, learning some phrases through Google Translate. He noted that for a time, the only English he knew was "I'm hungry": he said, "If somebody asked how I was doing, I said, 'I'm hungry.'" He was a top player at the school, being the state leader in double-doubles and rebounds while helping them win a state championship. He had 16 athletic scholarship offers coming out of high school and was ranked a three-star recruit, the third-best player in the state and the 16th-best nationally. He initially committed to play college basketball for the Mississippi State Bulldogs but later flipped to the New Mexico Lobos.

== College career ==
Matos redshirted at New Mexico in the 2019–20 season and debuted in the 2020–21 season, in which he played 20 games and started 15, totaling an average of 6.0 points and 4.1 rebounds per game. He entered the NCAA transfer portal after the season. He ultimately transferred to the South Florida Bulls. Matos appeared in 28 games, four as a starter, for the Bulls in the 2021–22 season, averaging 10.6 minutes per game while posting 1.5 points and 2.7 rebounds per game.

Matos joined the South Florida Bulls football team as a walk-on in 2022. Initially a defensive lineman and special teams player, he was later moved to offensive tackle. He briefly played on special teams and defensive end during the 2022 season.

== Professional career ==
Pre-draft measurables
Height	Weight	Arm length	Hand span	Wingspan	40-yard dash	10-yard split	20-yard split	20-yard shuttle	Three-cone drill	Vertical jump	Broad jump	Bench press
6 ft 7 1/8 in (2.01 m)	313 lb (142 kg)	35 1/4 in (0.90 m)	10 7/8 in (0.28 m)	6 ft 11 3/4 in (2.13 m)	4.92 s	1.77 s	2.89 s	4.77 s	7.64 s	28.0 in (0.71 m)	9 ft 5 in (2.87 m)	17 reps
All values from NFL IPP Pro Day

=== Miami Dolphins ===
In January 2024, Matos was announced as one of 16 players selected for the National Football League's International Player Pathway Program (IPPP), designed to give opportunities in the league to foreign players. He trained at IMG Academy and has been praised by NFL analyst Scott Pioli for his skills and size. Despite being 6 feet 7 inches (2.01 m) and 313 pounds (142 kg), he ran a 4.88 40-yard dash at his pro day, which would have been the best among all linemen at the NFL Scouting Combine. He was eligible to be selected at the 2024 NFL draft and was considered a potential late-round pick. He ultimately was not selected in the draft, but afterwards was signed by the Miami Dolphins as an undrafted free agent. He was waived on August 27, and re-signed to the practice squad. He signed a reserve/future contract on January 7, 2025.

On July 23, 2025 Matos suffered an injury at Miami Dolphins 2025 Training Camp. Team trainers came out in to the field but later Matos had to be airlifted to a hospital in the Miami-Dade area. On August 26, 2025, Matos was waived by the Dolphins with an injury designation as part of final roster cuts.

=== Indianapolis Colts ===
On October 14, 2025, Matos signed with the Indianapolis Colts' practice squad. He signed a reserve/future contract with Indianapolis on January 5, 2026.

On August 18, 2026, Matos was waived by the Colts.

== Personal life ==
Matos is the son of Jose and Kirsten Matos. He has one sibling, Ismael.
