= Grayson Murphy (American football) =

American football player (born 2000)

No. 59
- Position: Linebacker

Personal information
- Born: October 13, 2000 (age 26); Dallas, Texas, U.S.
- Listed height: 6 ft 2 in (1.88 m)
- Listed weight: 255 lb (116 kg)

Career information
- High school: Bishop Lynch (Dallas, Texas)
- College: North Texas (2019–2021); UCLA (2022–2023)
- NFL draft: 2024: undrafted

Career history
- Miami Dolphins (2024); Orlando Storm (2026)*
- * Offseason or practice squad member only
- Stats at Pro Football Reference

Grayson Murphy (born October 13, 2000) is an American former professional football linebacker. He played college football for the North Texas Mean Green and the UCLA Bruins.

== Early life ==
Murphy attended Bishop Lynch High School in Dallas, Texas. He committed to the University of North Texas to play college football.

== College career ==
Murphy played at North Texas from 2019 to 2021 as a linebacker and defensive end. In three years he started 14 of 25 games, recording 57 tackles and 11.5 sacks. After the 2021 season, he entered the transfer portal.

Murphy transferred to the University of California, Los Angeles (UCLA). In his first year at UCLA in 2022, he started all 13 games and had 27 tackles and five sacks. In 2023, he again started two games and had 33 tackles and 5.5 sacks.

== Professional career ==
Pre-draft measurables
Height	Weight	Arm length	Hand span	40-yard dash	10-yard split	20-yard split	20-yard shuttle	Three-cone drill	Vertical jump	Broad jump	Bench press
6 ft 2 1/2 in (1.89 m)	249 lb (113 kg)	30 1/2 in (0.77 m)	9 1/2 in (0.24 m)	4.66 s	1.62 s	2.66 s	4.56 s	7.10 s	37.0 in (0.94 m)	10 ft 5 in (3.18 m)	24 reps
All values from Pro Day

=== Miami Dolphins ===
Murphy signed with the Miami Dolphins as an undrafted free agent on May 10, 2024. He was placed on injured reserve on August 12.

On August 26, 2025, Murphy was waived by the Dolphins as part of final roster cuts.

=== Orlando Storm ===
On January 14, 2026, Murphy was selected by the Orlando Storm in the 2026 UFL Draft.

== Personal life ==
Murphy's identical twin, Gabriel, played with him at North Texas and UCLA, and played for the Minnesota Vikings.
