= Isaiah Johnson (cornerback, born 2000) =

American football player (born 2000)

Profile
- Position: Cornerback

Personal information
- Born: March 29, 2000 (age 26); Mansfield, Ohio, U.S.
- Listed height: 6 ft 3 in (1.91 m)
- Listed weight: 205 lb (93 kg)

Career information
- High school: Detroit Country Day (Detroit, Michigan)
- College: Dartmouth (2018–2021); Syracuse (2022–2023)
- NFL draft: 2024: undrafted

Career history
- Miami Dolphins (2024–2025)

Awards and highlights
- First-team All-Ivy League (2021)
- Stats at Pro Football Reference

Isaiah D. Johnson (born March 29, 2000) is an American professional football cornerback. He played college football at Dartmouth and Syracuse.

== Early life ==
Johnson attended the Detroit Country Day School in Detroit, Michigan.

== College career ==
Johnson played at Dartmouth from 2018 to 2021 and was named first-team All-Ivy league DB in 2021. After graduating from Dartmouth, he played for two years at Syracuse as a graduate transfer. He was a team captain at Syracuse and was a two-year starter at cornerback.

In 45 games in college, he had 188 tackles, 2.5 sacks, 14 pass breakups and three interceptions.

== Professional career ==
Pre-draft measurables
Height	Weight	Arm length	Hand span	Wingspan	40-yard dash	10-yard split	20-yard split	20-yard shuttle	Three-cone drill	Vertical jump	Broad jump	Bench press
6 ft 3 in (1.91 m)	205 lb (93 kg)	32 7/8 in (0.84 m)	8 7/8 in (0.23 m)	6 ft 8 1/2 in (2.04 m)	4.64 s	1.55 s	2.71 s	4.22 s	6.71 s	38.5 in (0.98 m)	10 ft 9 in (3.28 m)	12 reps
All values from NFL Combine/Pro Day

Johnson went undrafted in the 2024 NFL draft. On May 1, 2024, he signed as an undrafted free agent with the Miami Dolphins and was later moved to the practice squad, where he spent his entire rookie season.

On August 27, 2025, Johnson was waived by the Dolphins and re-signed to the practice squad five days later. He was promoted to the active roster on December 12. Johnson made four appearances for the Dolphins, recording three combined tackles. On December 26, it was announced that Johnson would miss the remainder of the season after suffering an ACL tear in practice.

On May 4, 2026, Johnson was waived by the Dolphins following a failed physical.
