= Mark Perry (American football) =

American football player (born 2001)

Profile
- Position: Safety

Personal information
- Born: May 30, 2001 (age 25); Torrance, California, U.S.
- Listed height: 6 ft 0 in (1.83 m)
- Listed weight: 211 lb (96 kg)

Career information
- High school: Rancho Cucamonga (Rancho Cucamonga, California)
- College: Colorado (2019–2021); TCU (2022–2023)
- NFL draft: 2024: undrafted

Career history
- Miami Dolphins (2024)*; Houston Texans (2024)*; New England Patriots (2024)*; Tennessee Titans (2025)*; Chicago Bears (2025)*; Green Bay Packers (2025)*; Arizona Cardinals (2026)*
- * Offseason or practice squad member only
- Stats at Pro Football Reference

Mark Perry (born May 30, 2001) is an American professional football safety. He played college football for the Colorado Buffaloes and TCU Horned Frogs.

== Early life ==
Perry attended Rancho Cucamonga High School. Coming out of high school, Perry was rated as a three star recruit, where he decided to commit to play college football for the Colorado Buffaloes.

== College career ==
=== Colorado ===
In Perry's freshman season in 2019, he totaled 16 tackles with four being for a loss, and a sack and a half. During the 2020 season, Perry would start in two games notching ten tackles. During the 2021 season, Perry tallied 72 tackles and three interceptions for the Buffaloes. After the conclusion of the 2021 season, Perry decided to enter his name into the NCAA transfer portal.

=== TCU ===
Perry decided to transfer to play for the TCU Horned Frogs. During the 2022 season, Perry notched 84 tackles with six and a half going for a loss, and two pass deflections. In the 2023 season, Perry finished the season with 58 tackles with three being for a loss, and a forced fumble.

== Professional career ==
Pre-draft measurables
Height	Weight	Arm length	Hand span	Wingspan	40-yard dash	10-yard split	20-yard split	20-yard shuttle	Three-cone drill	Vertical jump	Broad jump	Bench press
6 ft 0 1/8 in (1.83 m)	213 lb (97 kg)	31 3/8 in (0.80 m)	9 1/8 in (0.23 m)	6 ft 4 3/8 in (1.94 m)	4.42 s	1.58 s	2.55 s	4.40 s	7.14 s	37 in (0.94 m)	10 ft 11 in (3.33 m)	13 reps
All values from Pro Day

=== Miami Dolphins ===
After not being selected in the 2024 NFL draft, Perry decided to sign with the Miami Dolphins as an undrafted free agent. On July 16, 2024, Perry was placed on the Active/NFI list. On August 27, the Dolphins waived him as part of final roster cuts before the start of the regular season.

=== Houston Texans ===
On August 29, 2024, Perry signed with the practice squad of the Houston Texans. He was released on September 10.

=== New England Patriots ===
On September 16, 2024, Perry was signed to the New England Patriots' practice squad. He signed a reserve/future contract with New England on January 6, 2025. On April 28, Perry was released by the Patriots.

=== Tennessee Titans ===
On April 29, 2025, Perry was claimed off waivers by the Tennessee Titans. He was waived on August 5.

=== Chicago Bears ===
On August 12, 2025, Perry signed with the Chicago Bears. He was waived on August 24.

=== Green Bay Packers ===
On January 1, 2026, Perry was signed to the Green Bay Packers' practice squad. He signed a reserve/future contract with Green Bay on January 12.

On August 30, 2026, Perry was released by the Packers as a part of final roster cuts.

=== Arizona Cardinals ===
On October 6, 2026, Perry signed with the Arizona Cardinals practice squad. He was released on October 20.
