= Patrick McMorris =

American football player (born 2001)

Profile
- Position: Safety

Personal information
- Born: October 18, 2001 (age 25); Santa Ana, California, U.S.
- Listed height: 6 ft 0 in (1.83 m)
- Listed weight: 206 lb (93 kg)

Career information
- High school: Godinez Fundamental (Santa Ana); Santa Ana
- College: San Diego State (2019–2022); California (2023)
- NFL draft: 2024: 6th round, 198th overall pick

Career history
- Miami Dolphins (2024); New York Giants (2025)*; Arizona Cardinals (2025)*; New York Giants (2025)*; San Francisco 49ers (2026)*
- * Offseason or practice squad member only

Awards and highlights
- 2× First-team All-Mountain West (2021, 2022)

Career NFL statistics as of 2024
- Total tackles: 1
- Stats at Pro Football Reference

Patrick Allen McMorris (born October 18, 2001) is an American professional football safety. He played college football for the San Diego State Aztecs and California Golden Bears, and was selected by the Miami Dolphins in the sixth round of the 2024 NFL draft.

== Early life ==
McMorris was born on October 18, 2001, in Santa Ana, California. He was a top player at Godinez Fundamental High School in Santa Ana, where he totaled 2,287 rushing yards and 28 rushing touchdowns with a 6.5 yards-per-carry average. After helping Godinez win an Orange Coast League title as a junior, he transferred to Santa Ana High School for his senior year. In his senior year, he ran 141 times for 1,801 yards and 23 touchdowns, averaging 12.8 yards-per-carry while also having 99 tackles. A three-star recruit, he committed to play college football for the San Diego State Aztecs as a defensive back.

== College career ==
McMorris appeared in nine games as a true freshman at San Diego State in 2019, posting one tackle. He then appeared in seven games, one as a starter, in 2020, totaling 10 tackles and a pass breakup. He competed for a starting role in 2021. Ultimately winning it, he started all 14 games and was chosen first-team All-Mountain West Conference, leading the team in both tackles (90) and interceptions (four) while also having nine pass breakups. He repeated as a first-team All-Mountain West selection in 2022, recording 61 tackles, six pass breakups and an interception while being a team captain.

McMorris opted to transfer to the California Golden Bears for the 2023 season. He made 90 tackles, second on the team, and also had two fumble recoveries and an interception. He ended his collegiate career having appeared in 55 games, 40 as a starter, and made 252 tackles, 23 pass breakups and six interceptions. He was invited to the Hula Bowl and to the NFL Scouting Combine.

== Professional career ==
Pre-draft measurables
Height	Weight	Arm length	Hand span	Wingspan	20-yard shuttle	Three-cone drill	Vertical jump	Broad jump	Bench press
6 ft 0 1/8 in (1.83 m)	207 lb (94 kg)	31 7/8 in (0.81 m)	9 3/4 in (0.25 m)	6 ft 5 1/8 in (1.96 m)	4.28 s	7.09 s	32.5 in (0.83 m)	9 ft 11 in (3.02 m)	14 reps
All values from NFL Scouting Combine/Pro Day

=== Miami Dolphins ===
McMorris was selected by the Miami Dolphins in the sixth round (198th overall) of the 2024 NFL draft. He was placed on injured reserve on August 27, 2024. He was activated on November 26.

On August 26, 2025, McMorris was waived by the Dolphins as part of final roster cuts.

=== New York Giants ===
On August 28, 2025, McMorris was signed to the New York Giants' practice squad. He was released on September 16.

=== Arizona Cardinals ===
On September 23, 2025, McMorris was signed to the Arizona Cardinals' practice squad. He was released on October 8. McMorris was re-signed to the practice squad on December 16. He was released on December 24.

=== New York Giants (second stint) ===
On December 26, 2025, McMorris was signed to the New York Giants' practice squad. He signed a reserve/future contract with New York on January 5, 2026. On April 6, McMorris was released by the Giants.

=== San Francisco 49ers ===
On April 28, 2026, McMorris signed with the San Francisco 49ers. On August 30, he was waived by San Francisco as a part of final roster cuts.

== Personal life ==
McMorris is the son of Patrick McMorris and Lucy Guerrero. His brother, Malik, was a student athlete in the Cal football program for four seasons from 2015 to 2018, a member of the Golden Bears track and field squad during the 2016-2019 campaigns. He also has a brother named Hakim who was a member of the Cal track and field program for five seasons from 2019 to 2023.
