= Jordan Colbert =

American football player (born 2000)

Profile
- Position: Safety

Personal information
- Born: March 18, 2000 (age 26); Rockford, Illinois, U.S.
- Listed height: 6 ft 2 in (1.88 m)
- Listed weight: 218 lb (99 kg)

Career information
- High school: Gonzaga College (Washington, D.C.)
- College: Columbia (2018–2021); Rhode Island (2022–2023)
- NFL draft: 2024: undrafted

Career history
- Miami Dolphins (2024–2025)
- Stats at Pro Football Reference

Jordan Michael Colbert (born March 18, 2000) is an American professional football safety. He played college football for the Columbia Lions and Rhode Island Rams and was signed by the Miami Dolphins as an undrafted free agent in 2024.

== Early life ==
Colbert was born in Rockford, Illinois before moving to Washington, D.C. where he attended Gonzaga College High School.

Colbert played three seasons for the football team. He was named a First Team All-Washington Catholic Athletic Conference selection as a senior after recording 31 tackles, two interceptions and five passes defensed.

== College career ==
Colbert committed to Columbia University where he played for four seasons. In his four years at Columbia, where he was an All-Ivy League honorable mention honoree as a free safety in 2021. He played in 20 career games with 12 starts for the Lions' defensive unit; during his tenure, Colbert totaled 68 tackles (39 solo), a tackle for loss, two interceptions, six passes defensed, and a fumble recovery. In addition to his athletic commitments, he majored in psychology while studying at Columbia.

After graduating from Columbia, Colbert transferred to the University of Rhode Island. At Rhode Island, Colbert played in 21 games with 11 starts. In two seasons with the Rams, Colbert recorded 96 tackles (66 solo), 4.5 tackles for loss, a half-sack, two interceptions, six passes defensed, two forced fumbles and one fumble recovery. At Rhode Island, Colbert earned a master's degree in business administration.

== Professional career ==
Pre-draft measurables
Height	Weight	Arm length	Hand span	40-yard dash	10-yard split	20-yard split	20-yard shuttle	Three-cone drill	Vertical jump	Broad jump	Bench press
6 ft 1 7/8 in (1.88 m)	214 lb (97 kg)	32 1/8 in (0.82 m)	10 1/4 in (0.26 m)	4.58 s	1.58 s	2.53 s	4.28 s	6.80 s	39.5 in (1.00 m)	10 ft 5 in (3.18 m)	18 reps
All values from Pro Day

Colbert signed as an undrafted free agent with the Miami Dolphins on May 10, 2024. He was waived by Miami on August 27, and signed to the team's practice squad the following day. Colbert spent the entirety of the 2024 season on the Dolphins' practice squad.

Colbert signed a futures/reserve contract with Miami on January 7, 2025. He made the Dolphins' initial 53-man roster for the 2025 season, but was waived on August 27, after the team signed cornerback Rasul Douglas. On October 8, Colbert was promoted to the active roster. He played in five games for Miami, recording five combined tackles. On November 21, Colbert was placed on injured reserve due to a stinger he suffered in Week 11 against the Washington Commanders.

On June 2, 2026, Colbert was waived after a failed physical.
