= Lorenzo Dow Thompson (legislator) =

American politician (c.1810–1875)

Member of the Missouri House of Representatives from the Harrison County district
- In office 1846–1849

Personal details
- Born: c. 1810
- Died: 1875 (aged 65) near Bethany, Missouri, US
- Party: Democratic

Military service
- Rank: Private
- Battles/wars: Black Hawk War

Lorenzo Dow Thompson (c. 1810 – 1875) was an American politician who served in the Missouri House of Representatives. While serving in the military, he bested future President Abraham Lincoln in a wrestling match.

== Early life and military service ==
Thompson was born c. 1810, and was named for preacher Lorenzo Dow. He originally lived in St. Clair County, Illinois. He served as a private in the Black Hawk War, and on April 21, 1832, he wrestled future President Abraham Lincoln – ranked a captain at the time – in a wrestling match to decide which company encamped near Beardstown, Illinois. Thompson won the match, having thrown Lincoln twice.

The match was originally planned to be against captain William Moore, but he declined due to the unfair matchup, instead making his brother, sergeant Johnathon Moore – who also officiated the match, select a man from the company; he chose Thompson. Johnathan's son described Thompson as "not a very large man [...] compactly built, however, and muscular, very strong".

In a 1906 interview, historian Henry Cadle called Lincoln "a good loser". In Lincoln's career of 300 wrestling matches, the one against Thompson was his only recorded defeat. On August 8, 1860, Lincoln met Professor Ridson M. Moore (no relation to the abovementioned Moores), at which point Lincoln joked "which one of the Moore families do you belong to, I have a grudge against one of them".

== Politics and later life ==
Thompson was a member of the Democratic Party. He opposed the views of Missouri's longtime Democratic Senator Thomas Hart Benton and supported Lincoln during his presidency. He moved to Harrison County, Missouri in 1846, and was elected to the Missouri House of Representatives in 1846 and 1848; he was Harrison County's first state representative. He later served on the inaugural grand jury of Harrison County. Cadle described him as "positive in all his convictions" and "eccentric toward the end of his life".

Thompson had children. He died in 1875, aged 65, and is buried in Oakland Cemetery, near Bethany, Missouri.
