= Derrick McLendon =

American football player (born 2000)

Profile
- Position: Linebacker

Personal information
- Born: September 29, 2000 (age 26)
- Listed height: 6 ft 4 in (1.93 m)
- Listed weight: 250 lb (113 kg)

Career information
- High school: Tucker (DeKalb County, Georgia)
- College: Florida State (2019–2022); Colorado (2023)
- NFL draft: 2024: undrafted

Career history
- Carolina Panthers (2024)*; Miami Dolphins (2024–2025)
- * Offseason or practice squad member only

Career NFL statistics as of 2025
- Games played: 1
- Stats at Pro Football Reference

Derrick McLendon II (born September 29, 2000) is an American professional football linebacker. He played college football for the Florida State Seminoles and Colorado Buffaloes and was signed by the Carolina Panthers as an undrafted free agent in 2024.

== Early life ==
McLendon was born on September 29, 2000. His father, Derrick Sr., played college football for the Chattanooga Mocs. One of five children, McLendon grew up in Atlanta, Georgia, and started playing basketball at age three, then football at age four. He grew up playing both sports and attended Tucker High School where he played football. A defensive end, he tallied 35 tackles and six sacks as a senior. Across three years with Tucker's football team, McLendon recorded 85 tackles, 20.5 tackles-for-loss and 10.5 sacks. A three-star recruit, he committed to play college football for the Florida State Seminoles (FSU).

== College career ==
McLendon redshirted as a true freshman at Florida State in 2019, posting 0.5 TFLs in four games. He appeared in every game in 2020 and 2021, posting seven tackles and 2.5 TFLs in 2020 and 4.5 TFLs and 3.5 sacks in 2021. In 2022, McLendon tallied 37 tackles, 5.0 TFLs and 3.5 sacks while starting 12 of 13 games. He entered the NCAA transfer portal after the season, finishing his stint at FSU with 61 tackles, 12.5 TFLs and seven sacks in 38 games. He transferred to the Colorado Buffaloes for his final season in 2023 and recorded 14 tackles and 1.5 sacks while appearing in 12 games.

== Professional career ==
=== Carolina Panthers ===
After going unselected in the 2024 NFL draft, McLendon signed with the Carolina Panthers as an undrafted free agent. He was waived on August 27, 2024, as part of final roster cuts.

=== Miami Dolphins ===
On September 3, 2024, McLendon signed with the practice squad of the Miami Dolphins. He spent the entire season on the practice squad and signed a reserve/future contract with the Dolphins on January 7, 2025. He was waived on August 26, then re-signed to the practice squad the next day. McLendon was elevated to the active roster prior to the team's Week 17 and Week 18 games against the Tampa Bay Buccaneers and New England Patriots, respectively.

McLendon signed a reserve/future contract with Miami on January 6, 2026. He was waived by the Dolphins on May 4.
