= 2026 Miami Dolphins season =

57th season in the NFL, 61st season in franchise history

- Owner: Stephen M. Ross
- General manager: Jon-Eric Sullivan
- Head coach: Jeff Hafley
- Offensive coordinator: Bobby Slowik
- Defensive coordinator: Sean Duggan
- Home stadium: Hard Rock Stadium

Results
- Record: 1–9
- Division place: 4th AFC East

Uniform
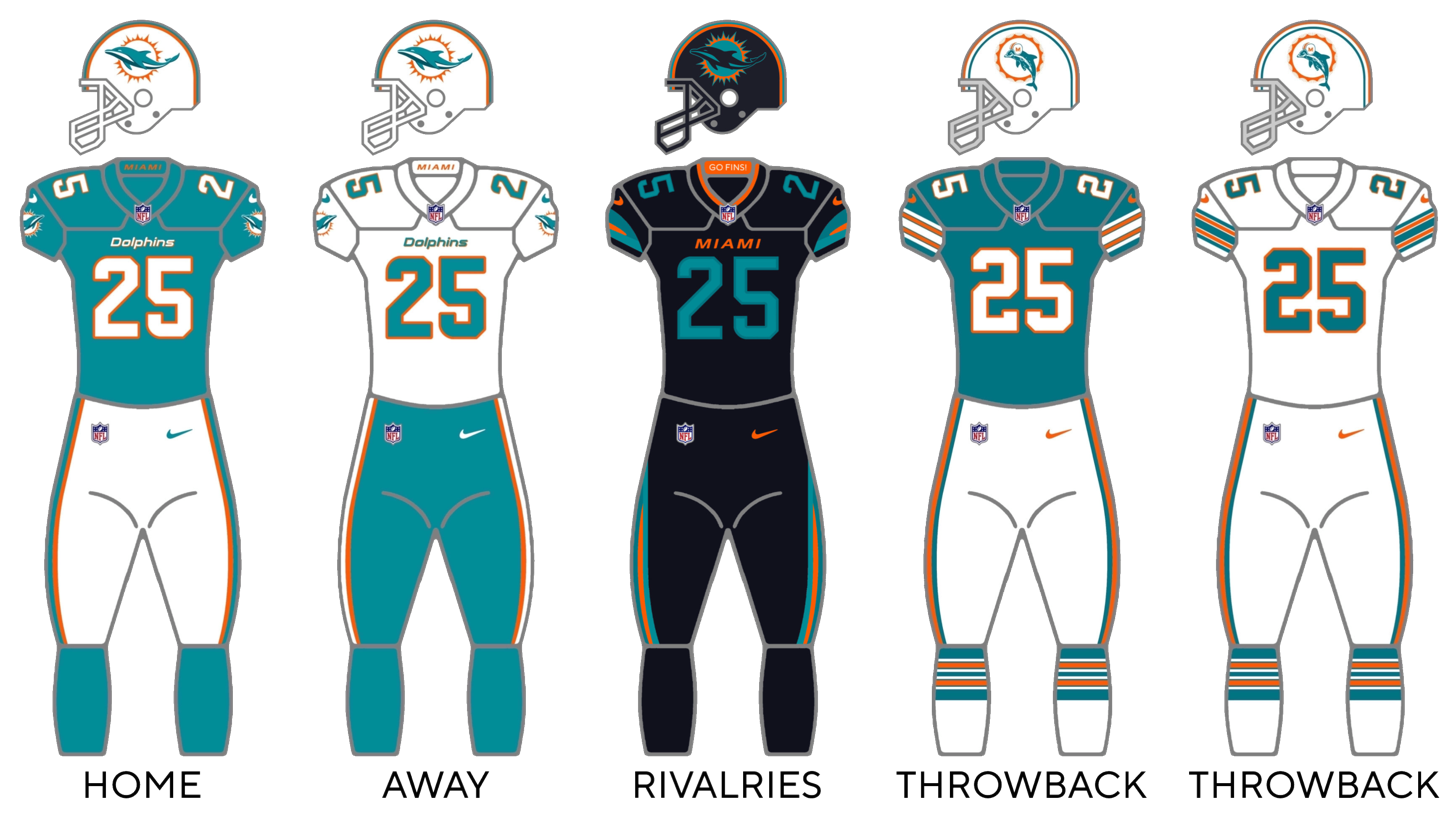

The 2026 season marks the 57th year for the Miami Dolphins in the National Football League (NFL) and their 61st season overall. It will also be the beginning of a new era under general manager Jon-Eric Sullivan and head coach Jeff Hafley. The season features significant roster changes, as it is the first since 2019 without quarterback Tua Tagovailoa, who was released and signed with the Atlanta Falcons. It also marks the first season since 2020 without wide receiver Jaylen Waddle, following his trade to the Denver Broncos, and the first since 2021 without Tyreek Hill, who was released. For the first time since 2019, the Dolphins failed to win any of their first five games.

== Offseason ==
=== Head coach ===
On January 8, 2026, the Dolphins fired Mike McDaniel after four seasons. On January 19, 2026, the Dolphins hired former Green Bay Packers defensive coordinator Jeff Hafley as their new head coach.

=== General manager ===
On October 31, 2025, the Dolphins parted ways with Chris Grier after ten seasons. Grier's tenure in Miami included notable draft picks such as Laremy Tunsil, Xavien Howard, Minkah Fitzpatrick, Mike Gesicki, Jerome Baker, Durham Smythe, Jason Sanders, Christian Wilkins, Andrew Van Ginkel, Tua Tagovailoa, Austin Jackson, Jaylen Waddle and Jaelan Phillips.

On January 9, 2026, the Dolphins hired former Green Bay Packers vice president of player personnel Jon-Eric Sullivan as their new general manager.

=== Departures ===
Position	Player	Date	Designation	2026 team
G	James Daniels	February 16	Released	TBD
WR	Tyreek Hill	February 16	Released	TBD
WR	Nick Westbrook-Ikhine	February 16	Released	Indianapolis Colts
G	Liam Eichenberg	March 2	Released	TBD
FB	Alec Ingold	March 6	Released	Los Angeles Chargers
K	Jason Sanders	March 6	Released	New York Giants
LB	Bradley Chubb	March 11	Released	Buffalo Bills
QB	Tua Tagovailoa	March 12	Released	Atlanta Falcons
CB	Isaiah Johnson	May 4	Waived	TBD
CB	Jason Maitre	May 4	Waived	TBD
EDGE	Derrick McLendon	May 4	Waived	TBD
S	Jordan Colbert	June 2	Waived	TBD
G	Kion Smith	June 15	Released	TBD

=== Trades ===
Trades below are only for trades that included a player. Draft pick-only trades will go in the draft section.

Date	Player(s)/Asset(s) received	Team	Player(s)/Asset(s) traded	Source
March 11	2026 7th round selection (No. 238)	New York Jets	S Minkah Fitzpatrick	
March 18	2026 1st round selection (No. 30), 2026 3rd round selection (No. 94), 2026 4th round selection (No. 130)	Denver Broncos	WR Jaylen Waddle, 2026 4th round selection (No. 111)	

=== Extensions and restructures ===
Below are players who are under contract through 2026 and received a contract extension or restructure.

Position	Player	Date signed	Notes
RB	De'Von Achane	May 20	4 years, $64 million
C	Aaron Brewer	June 11	3 years, $52.5 million
LB	Jordyn Brooks	July 22	3 years, $51.3 million

== Draft ==
2026 Miami Dolphins draft selections
Round	Selection	Player	Position	College	Notes
1	11	Traded to the Cowboys			
1	12	Kadyn Proctor	OT	Alabama	From Cowboys
1	27	Chris Johnson	CB	San Diego State	From 49ers
1	30	Traded to the 49ers			From Broncos
2	43	Jacob Rodriguez	LB	Texas Tech	
3	75	Caleb Douglas	WR	Texas Tech	
3	87	Will Kacmarek	TE	Ohio State	From Eagles
3	90	Traded to the 49ers			From Texans
3	94	Chris Bell	WR	Louisville	From Broncos
4	111	Traded to the Denver Broncos			
4	130	Trey Moore	DE	Texas	From Broncos
4	138	Kyle Louis	LB	Pittsburgh	Compensatory selection; From 49ers
5	151	Traded to the Carolina Panthers			
5	158	Michael Taaffe	S	Texas	From Vikings via Panthers
5	177	Kevin Coleman Jr.	WR	Missouri	From Cowboys
5	180	Seydou Traore	TE	Mississippi State	From Cowboys
6	192	Traded to the New York Giants			
6	200	DJ Campbell	G	Texas	From Panthers
7	227	Traded to the Carolina Panthers			
7	238	Max Llewellyn	DE	Iowa	From Chargers via Titans and Jets

Draft trades

2026 Miami Dolphins undrafted free agents
Player	Pos.	College	Ref.
Jim Bonifas	C	Iowa State	
Kevin Cline	OT	Boston College	
Mark Gronowski	QB	Iowa	
Anthony Hankerson	RB	Oregon State	
Rene Konga	DL	Louisville	
Donaven McCulley	WR	Michigan	
Rodney McGraw	OLB	Western Michigan	
Louis Moore	S	Indiana	
Le'Veon Moss	RB	Texas A&M	
Mason Reiger	OLB	Wisconsin	
Kahlil Saunders	DL	Kentucky	
DJ Herman	FB	San Diego State	

== Staff ==
Miami Dolphins staff
Front office: Chairman/Managing general partner – Stephen Ross; CEO – Daniel Sillman; Senior vice president, chief financial officer – Chris Clements; General manager – Jon-Eric Sullivan; Assistant general manager – Kyle Smith; Executive vice president, football operations – Brandon Shore; Senior personnel executive – Jon Robinson; Senior personnel executive – Shaun Herock; Director of player personnel – Matt Winston; Assistant director of player personnel – Josh Scobey; Director of college scouting – Grant Wallace; Director of pro scouting – Venzell Boulware; Vice president of football administration and strategy – Max Napolitano; Senior director, football operations – Olivia Sheehy; Director, football analytics – Ella Summer; Director, scouting operations – Minh Luu; Manager, football administration – John Glaser; Senior national scout – Ron Brockington; Special advisor to the vice chairman, president and CEO – Dan Marino; Head coaches: Head coach – Jeff Hafley; Offensive coaches: Offensive coordinator – Bobby Slowik; Passing game coordinator – Kevin Patullo; Quarterbacks – Bush Hamdan; Running backs – Ladell Betts; Wide receivers – Tyke Tolbert; Assistant wide receivers – Jonathan Krause; Tight ends – Ron Middleton; Assistant tight ends – Lemuel Jeanpierre; Offensive line – Zach Yenser; Assistant offensive line – Matt Applebaum; Offensive assistant – Leander Wallace; Offensive assistant – C. J. Conrad	Defensive coaches: Defensive coordinator – Sean Duggan; Defensive line – Austin Clark; Assistant defensive line – Chuka Ndulue; Linebackers – Al Washington; Assistant linebackers – Wendel Davis; Defensive backs/Passing game coordinator – Ryan Downard; Defensive backs/Cornerbacks – Jahmile Addae; Assistant defensive backs/Nickels – DeShawn Shead; Run game coordinator/Senior defensive assistant – Joe Barry; Defensive quality control – Siriki Diabate; Special teams coaches: Special teams coordinator – Chris Tabor; Assistant special teams – Brock Olivo; Special teams assistant – Darius Eubanks; Strength and conditioning coaches: Director, strength and conditioning – Todd Hunt; Assistant director, strength and conditioning – Willie Jones; Assistant strength and conditioning coach – Ike Brown, Andrew Papirio; → Coaching staff → Front office → More NFL staffs

== Current roster ==
Miami Dolphins roster
Quarterbacks (QB): 15 Brady Cook; 14 Kyle McCord; Running backs (RB): 30 Kaytron Allen; 0 Ollie Gordon II; 34 D. J. Herman FB; 5 Jaylen Wright; Wide receivers (WR): 18 Chris Bell; 21 Kevin Coleman Jr.; 7 Caleb Douglas; 1 Jalen Tolbert; 6 Malik Washington RS; 86 Jared Wayne; Tight ends (TE): 85 Greg Dulcich; 80 Justin Joly; 89 Will Kacmarek; 83 Seydou Traore	Offensive linemen (OL): 55 Aaron Brewer C; 79 Chukwuebuka Godrick T; 64 Christian Haynes G; 73 Austin Jackson T; 62 Jarrett Kingston T; 60 Andrew Meyer C; 52 Patrick Paul T; 74 Kadyn Proctor G; 71 Jonah Savaiinaea G; 77 Caedan Wallace G; Defensive linemen (DL): 97 Keith Cooper Jr. DT; 78 Kenneth Grant DT; 90 Malik Herring DE; 98 Jordan Jefferson DT; 57 Max Llewellyn DE; 59 Rodney McGraw DE; 44 Chop Robinson DE; 9 Joshua Uche DE; 95 Eric Watts DE	Linebackers (LB): 20 Jordyn Brooks ILB; 40 Willie Gay ILB; 45 Shaka Heyward ILB; 10 Jacob Rodriguez ILB; 42 Jackson Woodard ILB; Defensive backs (DB): 23 Zayne Anderson S; 22 Darrell Baker Jr. CB; 8 JuJu Brents CB; 24 Marcellas Dial CB; 3 Chris Johnson CB; 19 Kyle Louis S; 4 Jason Marshall Jr. CB; 32 Jaylin Simpson CB; 16 Michael Taaffe S; 11 Dante Trader Jr. S; 25 Julius Wood S; Special teams (ST): 46 Tucker Addington LS; 48 Bradley Pinion P	Practice squad: 50 Liam Anderson ILB; 27 Ethan Bonner CB; 84 Brady Boyd WR; 31 Jack Browning P; 43 Major Burns S; 91 Matthew Butler DT; 63 DJ Campbell G; 38 Daniel Carlson K; 65 James Ester G; 53 Amari Gainer DE; 82 A. J. Henning WR; 88 Jalen Reagor WR; 81 Will Sheppard WR; 96 Chris Smith DT; 26 Carlos Washington Jr. RB; 87 Tre Watson TE; Reserve: 93 Zeek Biggers DT (IR); 28 De'Von Achane RB (IR); 56 Ronnie Harrison ILB (IR); 95 Rene Konga DT (IR); 17 Trey Moore LB (IR); 94 Jordan Phillips DT (IR); 92 Zach Sieler DT (IR); 87 Cole Turner TE (IR); 2 Malik Willis QB (IR) 53 active, 16 practice squad, 9 reserve As of November 21, 2026. Rookies in italics.; Roster; Depth chart; Transactions

== Preseason ==
Week	Date	Opponent	Result	Record	Venue	Recap
1	August 14	at Washington Commanders	L 7–20	0–1	Northwest Stadium	Recap
2	August 22	New York Giants	L 3–26	0–2	Hard Rock Stadium	Recap
3	August 28	Atlanta Falcons	L 12–17	0–3	Hard Rock Stadium	Recap

== Regular season ==
=== Schedule ===
Week	Date	Time (ET)	Opponent	Result	Record	Venue	Network	Recap
1	September 13	4:25 p.m.	at Las Vegas Raiders	**L** 13–27	0–1	Allegiant Stadium	Fox	Recap
2	September 20	4:25 p.m.	at San Francisco 49ers	**L** 13–35	0–2	Levi's Stadium	Fox	Recap
3	September 27	1:00 p.m.	Kansas City Chiefs	**L** 10–24	0–3	Hard Rock Stadium	CBS	Recap
4	October 4	4:05 p.m.	at Minnesota Vikings	**L** 10–15	0–4	U.S. Bank Stadium	Fox	Recap
5	October 11	1:00 p.m.	Cincinnati Bengals	**L** 24–31	0–5	Hard Rock Stadium	Fox	Recap
6	Bye							
7	October 25	1:00 p.m.	at **New York Jets**	**W** 28–25	1–5	MetLife Stadium	CBS	Recap
8	November 1	4:25 p.m.	**New England Patriots**	**L** 19–24	1–6	Hard Rock Stadium	CBS	Recap
9	November 8	1:00 p.m.	Detroit Lions	**L** 9–19	1–7	Hard Rock Stadium	CBS	Recap
10	November 15	1:00 p.m.	at Indianapolis Colts	**L** 22–24	1–8	Lucas Oil Stadium	CBS	Recap
11	November 22	1:00 p.m.	at **Buffalo Bills**	**L** 9–26	1–9	Highmark Stadium	CBS	Recap
12	November 29	1:00 p.m.	**New York Jets**			Hard Rock Stadium	CBS	
13	December 6	4:05 p.m.	at Denver Broncos			Empower Field at Mile High	Fox	
14	December 13	1:00 p.m.	Chicago Bears			Hard Rock Stadium	CBS	
15	December 20	1:00 p.m.	at Green Bay Packers			Lambeau Field	Fox	
16	December 27	1:00 p.m.	Los Angeles Chargers			Hard Rock Stadium	Fox	
17	January 3	1:00 p.m.	**Buffalo Bills**			Hard Rock Stadium	CBS	
18	January 9/10	TBD	at **New England Patriots**			Gillette Stadium	TBD	

Notes

- Intra-division opponents are in **bold** text.
- Networks, dates and times from Weeks 13–17 are subject to change as a result of flexible scheduling.
- The date, time and network for Week 18 will be finalized at the end of Week 17.

=== Game summaries ===
==== Week 1: at Las Vegas Raiders ====
Week 1: Miami Dolphins at Las Vegas Raiders – Game summary

Quarter	1	2	3	4	Total
Dolphins	0	6	7	0	**13**
**Raiders**	7	10	10	0	**27**

at Allegiant Stadium, Paradise, Nevada

- Date: September 13
- Game time: 4:25 p.m. EDT/1:25 p.m. PDT
- Game weather: None (indoor stadium)
- Game attendance: 62,541
- Referee: Clete Blakeman
- TV announcers (Fox): Chris Myers, Mark Schlereth and Jen Hale
- Recap, Game Book

Game information

**First quarter**

- LV – Jack Bech 15-yard pass from Kirk Cousins (Matt Gay kick), 1:33. Raiders 7–0. **Drive: 16 plays, 93 yards, 8:58.**

**Second quarter**

- LV – Matt Gay 47-yard field goal, 10:22. Raiders 10–0. **Drive: 9 plays, 38 yards, 3:46.**
- MIA – Riley Patterson 41-yard field goal, 4:08. Raiders 10–3. **Drive: 10 plays, 42 yards, 6:14.**
- LV – Ashton Jeanty 13-yard pass from Kirk Cousins (Matt Gay kick), 1:07. Raiders 17–3. **Drive: 7 plays, 54 yards, 3:01.**
- MIA – Riley Patterson 37-yard field goal, 0:00. Raiders 17–6. **Drive: 6 plays, 51 yards, 1:07.**

**Third quarter**

- MIA – Malik Willis 14-yard run (Riley Patterson kick), 12:44. Raiders 17–13. **Drive: 4 plays, 52 yards, 1:45.**
- LV – Ashton Jeanty 13-yard pass from Kirk Cousins (Matt Gay kick), 9:58. Raiders 24–13. **Drive: 5 plays, 50 yards, 2:46.**
- LV – Matt Gay 30-yard field goal, 2:34. Raiders 27–13. **Drive: 13 plays, 54 yards, 7:07.**

**Fourth quarter**

- No scoring plays

**Top passers**

- MIA – Malik Willis – 15/27, 220 yards, INT
- LV – Kirk Cousins – 21/30, 160 yards, 3 TD, 2 INT

**Top rushers**

- MIA – Malik Willis – 6 rushes, 39 yards, TD
- LV – Ashton Jeanty – 23 rushes, 102 yards

**Top receivers**

- MIA – Caleb Douglas – 5 receptions, 94 yards
- LV – Ashton Jeanty – 6 receptions, 45 yards, 2 TD

==== Week 2: at San Francisco 49ers ====
Week 2: Miami Dolphins at San Francisco 49ers – Game summary

Quarter	1	2	3	4	Total
Dolphins	0	6	0	7	**13**
**49ers**	7	7	21	0	**35**

at Levi's Stadium, Santa Clara, California

- Date: September 20
- Game time: 4:25 p.m. EDT/1:25 p.m. PDT
- Game weather: Cloudy, 69 °F (21 °C)
- Game attendance: 70,878
- Referee: Shawn Smith
- TV announcers (Fox): Kevin Kugler, Daryl Johnston and Allison Williams
- Recap, Game Book

Game information

**First quarter**

- SF – Christian McCaffrey 1-yard run (Eddy Pineiro kick), 4:17. 49ers 7–0. **Drive: 12 plays, 59 yards, 6:11.**

**Second quarter**

- MIA – Riley Patterson 28-yard field goal, 9:56. 49ers 7–3. **Drive: 17 plays, 63 yards, 9:21.**
- SF – Brock Purdy 2-yard run (Eddy Pineiro kick), 5:24. 49ers 14–3. **Drive: 8 plays, 71 yards, 4:32.**
- MIA – Riley Patterson 23-yard field goal, 0:00. 49ers 14–6. **Drive: 12 plays, 58 yards, 5:24.**

**Third quarter**

- SF – George Kittle 12-yard pass from Brock Purdy (Eddy Pineiro kick), 13:08. 49ers 21–6. **Drive: 4 plays, 65 yards, 1:12.**
- SF – Kyle Juszczyk 6-yard pass from Brock Purdy (Eddy Pineiro kick), 5:46. 49ers 28–6. **Drive: 8 plays, 71 yards, 5:03.**
- SF – Christian McCaffrey 1-yard run (Eddy Pineiro kick), 3:10. 49ers 35–6. **Drive: 2 plays, 28 yards, 0:39.**

**Fourth quarter**

- MIA – Ryan Miller 77-yard pass from Malik Willis (Riley Patterson kick), 2:30. 49ers 35–13. **Drive: 3 plays, 83 yards, 1:33.**

**Top passers**

- MIA – Malik Willis – 14/23, 197 yards, TD
- SF – Brock Purdy – 20/22, 287 yards, 2 TD

**Top rushers**

- MIA – De'Von Achane – 20 rushes, 74 yards
- SF – Brock Purdy – 3 rushes, 30 yards, TD

**Top receivers**

- MIA – Ryan Miller – 1 receptions, 77 yards, TD
- SF – George Kittle – 4 receptions, 80 yards, TD

==== Week 3: vs. Kansas City Chiefs ====
Week 3: Kansas City Chiefs at Miami Dolphins – Game summary

Quarter	1	2	3	4	Total
**Chiefs**	7	7	0	10	**24**
Dolphins	7	0	3	0	**10**

at Hard Rock Stadium, Miami Gardens, Florida

- Date: September 27
- Game time: 1:00 p.m. EDT
- Game weather: Partly cloudy, 86 °F (30 °C)
- Game attendance: 59,216
- Referee: Alex Moore
- TV announcers (CBS): Kevin Harlan, Trent Green and Melanie Collins
- Recap, Game Book

Game information

**First quarter**

- KC – Kenneth Walker III 10-yard run (Harrison Butker kick), 12:54. Chiefs 7–0. **Drive: 4 plays, 67 yards, 2:06.**
- MIA – Ollie Gordon II 3-yard run (Riley Patterson kick), 3:27. Tied 7–7. **Drive: 17 plays, 91 yards, 9:27.**

**Second quarter**

- KC – Kenneth Walker III 5-yard pass from Patrick Mahomes (Harrison Butker kick), 12:58. Chiefs 14–7. **Drive: 10 plays, 65 yards, 5:29.**

**Third quarter**

- MIA – Riley Patterson 37-yard field goal, 10:10. Chiefs 14–10. **Drive: 9 plays, 56 yards, 4:50.**

**Fourth quarter**

- KC – Harrison Butker 34-yard field goal, 11:35. Chiefs 17–10. **Drive: 13 plays, 80 yards, 6:36.**
- KC – Travis Kelce 11-yard pass from Patrick Mahomes (Harrison Butker kick), 2:55. Chiefs 24–10. **Drive: 5 plays, 47 yards, 3:01.**

**Top passers**

- KC – Patrick Mahomes – 20/24, 246 yards, 2 TD, INT
- MIA – Malik Willis – 20/36, 210 yards, INT

**Top rushers**

- KC – Kenneth Walker III – 18 rushes, 70 yards, TD
- MIA – Malik Willis – 9 rushes, 56 yards

**Top receivers**

- KC – Rashee Rice – 7 receptions, 88 yards
- MIA – Chris Bell – 4 receptions, 67 yards

The Dolphins lost De'von Achane for the season due to an ACL tear.

==== Week 4: at Minnesota Vikings ====
Week 4: Miami Dolphins at Minnesota Vikings – Game summary

Quarter	1	2	3	4	Total
Dolphins	0	0	10	0	**10**
**Vikings**	3	6	3	3	**15**

at U.S. Bank Stadium, Minneapolis, Minnesota

- Date: October 4
- Game time: 4:05 p.m. EDT/3:05 p.m. CDT
- Game weather: None (indoor stadium)
- Game attendance: 66,752
- Referee: Adrian Hill
- TV announcers (Fox): Kevin Kugler, Daryl Johnston and Allison Williams
- Recap, Game Book

Game information

**First quarter**

- MIN – Will Reichard 47-yard field goal, 7:54. Vikings 3–0. **Drive: 6 plays, 9 yards, 2:57.**

**Second quarter**

- MIN – Will Reichard 50-yard field goal, 7:08. Vikings 6–0. **Drive: 10 plays, 50 yards, 5:07.**
- MIN – Will Reichard 33-yard field goal, 0:00. Vikings 9–0. **Drive: 10 plays, 61 yards, 2:43.**

**Third quarter**

- MIA – Riley Patterson 27-yard field goal, 11:56. Vikings 9–3. **Drive: 7 plays, 60 yards, 3:04.**
- MIN – Will Reichard 41-yard field goal, 6:35. Vikings 12–3. **Drive: 10 plays, 42 yards, 5:21.**
- MIA – Ollie Gordon II 12-yard run (Riley Patterson kick), 0:11. Vikings 12–10. **Drive: 4 plays, 55 yards, 1:41.**

**Fourth quarter**

- MIN – Will Reichard 29-yard field goal, 6:41. Vikings 15–10. **Drive: 15 plays, 60 yards, 8:30.**

**Top passers**

- MIA – Malik Willis – 9/17, 85 yards
- MIN – Kyler Murray – 27/37, 247 yards

**Top rushers**

- MIA – Ollie Gordon II – 9 rushes, 100 yards, TD
- MIN – Aaron Jones – 20 rushes, 94 yards

**Top receivers**

- MIA – Malik Washington – 5 receptions, 67 yards
- MIN – T. J. Hockenson – 13 receptions, 119 yards

Despite entering this game as 10-point underdogs, the Dolphins managed to keep the game close by holding the Vikings to only field goals, while scoring the only touchdown of the game, courtesy of a 12-yard run from Ollie Gordon in the 3rd quarter, which was not enough as the Dolphins fell to 0–4 on the season. They became now one of five winless teams remaining, the others being the Chargers, Titans, Texans and Buccaneers.

==== Week 5: vs. Cincinnati Bengals ====
Week 5: Cincinnati Bengals at Miami Dolphins – Game summary

Quarter	1	2	3	4	Total
**Bengals**	7	14	7	3	**31**
Dolphins	7	0	3	14	**24**

at Hard Rock Stadium, Miami Gardens, Florida

- Date: October 11
- Game time: 1:00 p.m. EDT
- Game weather: Sunny, 90 °F (32 °C)
- Game attendance: 58,223
- Referee: Brad Rogers
- TV announcers (Fox): Eric Collins, Mark Schlereth and Jen Hale
- Recap, Game Book

Game information

**First quarter**

- CIN – Mike Gesicki 4-yard pass from Joe Burrow (Evan McPherson kick), 14:03. Bengals 7–0. **Drive: 3 plays, 10 yards, 0:57.**
- MIA – Ollie Gordon II 1-yard run (Riley Patterson kick), 8:02. Tied 7–7. **Drive: 11 plays, 60 yards, 6:01.**

**Second quarter**

- CIN – Samaje Perine 6-yard pass from Joe Burrow (Evan McPherson kick), 11:51. Bengals 14–7. **Drive: 13 plays, 58 yards, 7:36.**
- CIN – Tanner Hudson 2-yard pass from Joe Burrow (Evan McPherson kick), 0:55. Bengals 21–7. **Drive: 9 plays, 53 yards, 4:20.**

**Third quarter**

- MIA – Riley Patterson 29-yard field goal, 5:13. Bengals 21–10. **Drive: 11 plays, 50 yards, 5:24.**
- CIN – Ja'Marr Chase 45-yard pass from Joe Burrow (Evan McPherson kick), 0:39. Bengals 28–10. **Drive: 7 plays, 77 yards, 4:34.**

**Fourth quarter**

- MIA – Kevin Coleman Jr. 3-yard pass from Malik Willis (Malik Willis–Greg Dulcich pass), 7:13. Bengals 28–18. **Drive: 14 plays, 80 yards, 8:26.**
- CIN – Evan McPherson 26-yard field goal, 2:09. Bengals 31–18. **Drive: 4 plays, 2 yards, 0:19.**
- MIA – Malik Willis 1-yard run (kick failed), 0:45. Bengals 31–24. **Drive: 8 plays, 61 yards, 1:24.**

**Top passers**

- CIN – Joe Burrow – 23/32, 190 yards, 4 TD
- MIA – Malik Willis – 15/27, 137 yards, TD, 2 INT

**Top rushers**

- CIN – Samaje Perine – 14 rushes, 68 yards
- MIA – Ollie Gordon II – 18 rushes, 88 yards, TD

**Top receivers**

- CIN – Ja'Marr Chase – 6 receptions, 77 yards, TD
- MIA – Malik Washington – 6 receptions, 43 yards

With their third straight loss to the Bengals, the Dolphins fell to 0–5 for the first time since 2019.

==== Week 7: at New York Jets ====
Week 7: Miami Dolphins at New York Jets – Game summary

Quarter	1	2	3	4	Total
**Dolphins**	14	7	0	7	**28**
Jets	7	0	7	11	**25**

at MetLife Stadium, East Rutherford, New Jersey

- Date: October 25
- Game time: 1:00 p.m. EDT
- Game weather: Sunny, 64 °F (18 °C)
- Game attendance: 72,456
- Referee: Brad Allen
- TV announcers (CBS): Spero Dedes, Adam Archuleta, and Aditi Kinkhabwala
- Recap, Game Book

Game information

**First quarter**

- MIA – Caleb Douglas 7-yard pass from Malik Willis (Zane Gonzalez kick), 10:53. Dolphins 7–0. **Drive: 7 plays, 76 yards, 4:07.**
- NYJ – Mason Taylor 13-yard pass from Geno Smith (Jason Sanders kick), 8:37. Tied 7–7. **Drive: 4 plays, 65 yards, 2:16.**
- MIA – Ollie Gordon II 1-yard run (Zane Gonzalez kick), 1:02. Dolphins 14–7. **Drive: 14 plays, 60 yards, 7:35.**

**Second quarter**

- MIA – Malik Willis 2-yard rush (Zane Gonzalez kick), 0:06. 21–7. **Drive: 15 plays, 91 yards, 8:38.**

**Third quarter**

- NYJ – Omar Cooper Jr. 3-yard pass from Geno Smith (Jason Sanders kick), 5:50. Dolphins 21–14. **Drive: 6 plays, 73 yards, 2:26.**

**Fourth quarter**

- NYJ – Jason Sanders 33-yard field goal, 8:57. Dolphins 21–17. **Drive: 12 plays, 68 yards, 6:10.**
- MIA – Caleb Douglas 63-yard pass from Malik Willis (Zane Gonzalez kick), 4:44. Dolphins 28–17. **Drive: 3 plays, 76 yards, 1:25.**
- NYJ – Mason Taylor 12-yard pass from Geno Smith (Geno Smith-Mason Taylor pass), 3:24. Dolphins 28–25. **Drive: 7 plays, 65 yards, 1:20.**

**Top passers**

- MIA – Malik Willis – 14/21, 208 yards, 2 TD
- NYJ – Geno Smith – 23/30, 287 yards, 3 TD, INT

**Top rushers**

- MIA – Ollie Gordon II – 25 rushes, 103 yards, TD
- NYJ – Braelon Allen – 17 rushes, 104 yards

**Top receivers**

- MIA – Greg Dulcich – 5 receptions, 86 yards
- NYJ – Omar Cooper Jr. – 5 receptions, 115 yards, TD

==== Week 8: vs. New England Patriots ====
Week 8: New England Patriots at Miami Dolphins – Game summary

Quarter	1	2	3	4	Total
**Patriots**	3	0	14	7	**24**
Dolphins	3	10	0	6	**19**

at Hard Rock Stadium, Miami Gardens, Florida

- Date: November 1
- Game time: 4:25 p.m. EST
- Game weather: Cloudy, 77 °F (25 °C)
- Game attendance: 59,023
- Referee: Alex Moore
- TV announcers (CBS): Andrew Catalon, Logan Ryan, and Emily Proud
- Recap, Game Book

Game information

**First quarter**

- NE – Andy Borregales 34-yard field goal, 9:10. Patriots 3–0. **Drive: 8 plays, 35 yards, 3:31.**
- MIA – Zane Gonzalez 31-yard field goal, 3:39. Tied 3–3. **Drive: 4 plays, 6 yards, 2:09.**

**Second quarter**

- MIA – Zane Gonzalez 52-yard field goal, 9:27. Dolphins 6–3. **Drive: 12 plays, 55 yards, 6:53.**
- MIA – Malik Washington 1-yard pass from Malik Willis (Zane Gonzalez kick), 0:08. Dolphins 13–3. **Drive: 11 plays, 70 yards, 2:11.**

**Third quarter**

- NE – Kyle Williams 43-yard pass from Drake Maye (Andy Borregales kick), 9:23. Dolphins 13–10. **Drive: 11 plays, 70 yards, 2:11.**
- NE – Drake Maye 2-yard run (Andy Borregales kick), 0:59. Patriots 17–13. **Drive: 13 plays, 73 yards, 7:36.**

**Fourth quarter**

- NE – DeMario Douglas 48-yard pass from Drake Maye (Andy Borregales kick), 12:39. Patriots 24–13. **Drive: 2 plays, 53 yards, 0:52.**
- MIA – Kevin Coleman Jr. 35-yard pass from Malik Willis (pass failed), 2:04. Patriots 24–19. **Drive: 8 plays, 84 yards, 1:57.**

**Top passers**

- NE – Drake Maye – 16/20, 199 yards, 2 TD
- MIA – Malik Willis – 21/32, 211 yards, 2 TD, INT

**Top rushers**

- NE – Rhamondre Stevenson – 19 rushes, 82 yards
- MIA – Ollie Gordon II – 19 rushes, 69 yards

**Top receivers**

- NE – DeMario Douglas – 3 receptions, 76 yards, TD
- MIA – Kevin Coleman Jr. – 3 receptions, 46 yards, TD

This marked the first time the Dolphins lost back-to-back home games to the Patriots since 2011-2012.

==== Week 9: vs. Detroit Lions ====
Week 9: Detroit Lions at Miami Dolphins – Game summary

Quarter	1	2	3	4	Total
**Lions**	3	3	10	3	**19**
Dolphins	3	0	3	3	**9**

at Hard Rock Stadium, Miami Gardens, Florida

- Date: November 8
- Game time: 1:00 p.m. EST
- Game weather: Partly cloudy, 84 °F (29 °C)
- Game attendance: 62,984
- Referee: Land Clark
- TV announcers (CBS): Kevin Harlan, Trent Green and Melanie Collins
- Recap, Game Book

Game information

**First quarter**

- DET – Jake Bates 28-yard field goal, 8:22. Lions 3–0. **Drive: 12 plays, 50 yards, 6:38.**
- MIA – Zane Gonzalez 34-yard field goal, 1:02. Tied 3–3. **Drive: 6, plays, 23 yards, 4:01.**

**Second quarter**

- DET – Jake Bates 40-yard field goal, 3:30. Lions 6–3. **Drive: 8 plays, 35 yards, 4:35.**

**Third quarter**

- DET – Jake Bates 33-yard field goal, 9:14. Lions 9–3. **Drive: 8 plays, 12 yards, 4:09.**
- MIA – Zane Gonzalez 52-yard field goal, 4:00. Lions 9–6. **Drive: 8, plays, 26 yards, 5:14.**
- DET – Jahmyr Gibbs 8-yard run (Jake Bates kick), 1:20. Lions 16–6. **Drive: 6 plays, 65 yards, 2:40.**

**Fourth quarter**

- MIA – Zane Gonzalez 34-yard field goal, 9:26. Lions 16–9. **Drive: 11, plays, 55 yards, 6:54.**
- DET – Jake Bates 43-yard field goal, 4:28. Lions 19–9. **Drive: 9 plays, 46 yards, 4:58.**

**Top passers**

- DET – Jared Goff – 17/25, 170 yards, INT
- MIA – Malik Willis – 13/25, 128 yards, INT

**Top rushers**

- DET – Jahmyr Gibbs – 20 rushes, 74 yards, TD
- MIA – Ollie Gordon II – 16 rushes, 55 yards

**Top receivers**

- DET – Amon-Ra St. Brown – 8 receptions, 86 yards
- MIA – Caleb Douglas – 6 receptions, 70 yards

==== Week 10: at Indianapolis Colts ====
Week 10: Miami Dolphins at Indianapolis Colts – Game summary

Quarter	1	2	3	4	Total
Dolphins	0	7	9	6	**22**
**Colts**	0	14	10	0	**24**

at Lucas Oil Stadium, Indianapolis, Indiana

- Date: November 15
- Game time: 1:00 p.m. EST
- Game weather: None (retractable roof closed)
- Game attendance: 64,235
- Referee: Don Willard
- TV announcers (CBS): Spero Dedes, Adam Archuleta and Aditi Kinkhabwala
- Recap, Game Book

Game information

**First quarter**

- No scoring plays

**Second quarter**

- IND – Seth McGowan 4-yard run (Spencer Shrader kick), 14:51. Colts 7–0. **Drive: 12 plays, 63 yards, 6:49.**
- MIA – Jalen Tolbert 34-yard pass from Malik Washington (Zane Gonzalez kick), 11:54. Tied 7–7. **Drive: 5 plays, 73 yards, 2:57.**
- IND – Laquon Treadwell 7-yard pass from Daniel Jones (Spencer Shrader kick), 0:39. Colts 14–7. **Drive: 9 plays, 92 yards, 5:56.**

**Third quarter**

- IND – Adetomiwa Adebawore fumble recovery in end zone (Spencer Shrader kick), 14:48. Colts 21–7. **Drive: 1 play, -10 yards, 0:12.**
- MIA – Zane Gonzalez 53-yard field goal, 12:12. Colts 21–10. **Drive: 6 plays, 31 yards, 2:36.**
- MIA – Chris Johnson 59-yard interception return (Spencer Shrader kick), Colts 21–16. **Drive: 1 play, 0 yards, 0:15.**
- IND – Spencer Shrader 51-yard field goal, 3:40. Colts 24–16. **Drive: 9 plays, 52 yards, 5:12.**

**Fourth quarter**

- MIA – Kyle McCord 3-yard run (pass failed), 14:56. Colts 24–22. **Drive: 7 plays, 71 yards, 3:44.**

**Top passers**

- MIA – Kyle McCord – 17/32, 209 yards
- IND – Daniel Jones – 23/30, 287 yards, 3 TD, INT

**Top rushers**

- MIA – Ollie Gordon II – 20 rushes, 76 yards
- IND – Jonathan Taylor – 16 rushes, 83 yards

**Top receivers**

- MIA – Caleb Douglas – 3 receptions, 71 yards
- IND – Ashton Dulin – 1 receptions, 30 yards

==== Week 11: at Buffalo Bills ====
Week 11: Miami Dolphins at Buffalo Bills – Game summary

Quarter	1	2	3	4	Total
Dolphins	0	6	3	0	**9**
**Bills**	6	14	0	6	**26**

at Highmark Stadium, Orchard Park, New York

- Date: November 22
- Game time: 1:00 p.m. EST
- Game weather: Fair, 64 °F (18 °C)
- Game attendance: 60,590
- Referee: Scott Novak
- TV announcers (CBS): Spero Dedes, Adam Archuleta and Aditi Kinkhabwala
- Recap, Game Book

==== Week 12: vs. New York Jets ====
Week 12: New York Jets at Miami Dolphins – Game summary

Quarter	1	2	3	4	Total
Jets	0	0	0	0	**0**
Dolphins	0	0	0	0	**0**

at Hard Rock Stadium, Miami Gardens, Florida

- Date: November 29
- Game time: 1:00 p.m. EST
- TV announcers (CBS): Spero Dedes, Adam Archuleta and Aditi Kinkhabwala
- Preview

=== Standings ===
==== Division ====
AFC East
	W	L	T	PCT	DIV	CONF	PF	PA	STK
Buffalo Bills	9	1	0	.900	2–1	6–1	313	208	W6
New England Patriots	5	5	0	.500	3–0	5–1	221	242	L2
New York Jets	2	8	0	.200	0–3	2–5	194	254	L5
Miami Dolphins	1	9	0	.100	1–2	1–6	157	250	L4

==== Conference ====
AFC
Seed	Team	Division	W	L	T	PCT	DIV	CONF	SOS	SOV	STK
**Division leaders**
1	Buffalo Bills	East	9	1	0	.900	2–1	6–1	.424	.416	W6
2	Kansas City Chiefs	West	8	2	0	.800	3–1	6–1	.374	.300	W3
3 (Note: Jacksonville wins tie break over Cincinnati based on head-to-head victory.)	Jacksonville Jaguars	South	7	2	0	.778	2–1	6–2	.444	.408	W3
4	Cincinnati Bengals	North	7	2	0	.778	2–1	5–2	.389	.310	W5
**Wild cards**
5	Denver Broncos	West	7	2	0	.778	2–1	3–1	.591	.522	W5
6 (Note: Cleveland wins tie break over Pittsburgh based on division record.)	Cleveland Browns	North	6	4	0	.600	2–1	4–3	.410	.377	W1
7	Pittsburgh Steelers	North	6	4	0	.600	2–2	3–3	.465	.417	L2
**In the hunt**
8	New England Patriots	East	5	5	0	.500	3–0	5–1	.576	.440	L2
9 (Note: Houston wins tie break over Las Vegas based on strength of victory.)	Houston Texans	South	4	6	0	.400	3–1	4–4	.480	.308	W1
10	Las Vegas Raiders	West	4	6	0	.400	1–1	3–3	.500	.179	L2
11	Baltimore Ravens	North	4	7	0	.364	0–2	2–5	.459	.286	L6
12	Indianapolis Colts	South	3	8	0	.273	1–3	2–6	.463	.293	L1
13	New York Jets	East	2	8	0	.200	0–3	2–5	.560	.350	L5
14	Los Angeles Chargers	West	1	8	0	.111	0–3	1–5	.560	.364	W1
15 (Note: Tennessee wins tie break over Miami based on strength of victory.)	Tennessee Titans	South	1	9	0	.100	1–2	1–6	.465	.273	L4
16	Miami Dolphins	East	1	9	0	.100	1–2	1–6	.622	.200	L4
