= Rodney McGraw =

American football player (born 2002)

No. 59 – Miami Dolphins
- Position: Defensive end
- Roster status: Active

Personal information
- Born: March 31, 2002 (age 24); Chicago, Illinois, U.S.
- Listed height: 6 ft 4 in (1.93 m)
- Listed weight: 273 lb (124 kg)

Career information
- High school: Elkhart Central (Elkhart, Indiana)
- College: Penn State (2021–2022); Louisville (2023); Western Michigan (2024–2025)
- NFL draft: 2026: undrafted

Career history
- Miami Dolphins (2026–present)

Career NFL statistics as of Week 4, 2026
- Games played: 1
- Stats at Pro Football Reference

Rodney Patrick McGraw (born March 31, 2002) is an American professional football defensive end for the Miami Dolphins of the National Football League (NFL). He played college football for the Penn State Nittany Lions, Louisville Cardinals and Western Michigan Broncos.

== Professional career ==
Pre-draft measurables
Height	Weight	Arm length	Hand span	Wingspan	40-yard dash	10-yard split	20-yard split	20-yard shuttle	Three-cone drill	Vertical jump	Broad jump	Bench press
6 ft 4 1/2 in (1.94 m)	264 lb (120 kg)	32 3/4 in (0.83 m)	9 1/8 in (0.23 m)	6 ft 6 3/8 in (1.99 m)	4.72 s	1.70 s	2.78 s	4.70 s	7.27 s	29.5 in (0.75 m)	9 ft 0 in (2.74 m)	20 reps
All values from Pro Day

On May 8, 2026, McGraw signed with the Miami Dolphins after going unselected in the 2026 NFL draft. On August 30, he was waived by Miami as a part of the team's final roster cuts. McGraw was re–signed to the Dolphins' practice squad the following day. On October 3, McGraw was elevated to Miami's active roster for the team's Week 4 matchup against the Minnesota Vikings; he made his NFL debut in the game, recording two tackles. He was signed to the active roster on October 20.
