= Jon-Eric Sullivan =

American football executive (born 1976)

Miami Dolphins
- Title: General manager

Personal information
- Born: August 10, 1976 (age 50); Columbia, South Carolina, U.S.
- Listed height: 5 ft 9 in (1.75 m)
- Listed weight: 170 lb (77 kg)

Career information
- High school: Catholic (Baton Rouge, Louisiana); Fork Union Military Academy (Fork Union, Virginia)
- College: South Carolina (1995–1997); Gardner–Webb (1998–1999)
- NFL draft: 2000: undrafted

Career history

Coaching
- Gardner–Webb (2000) Student assistant

Operations
- Green Bay Packers (2004–2025); Football operations assistant (2004–2007); Scout (2008–2015); Director of college scouting (2016–2017); Co-director of player personnel (2018–2021); Vice president of player personnel (2022–2025); Miami Dolphins (2026–present) General manager

Jon-Eric Sullivan (born August 10, 1976) an American professional football executive who is the general manager of the Miami Dolphins of the National Football League (NFL). He played college football for the South Carolina Gamecocks and Gardner–Webb Runnin' Bulldogs and joined the Green Bay Packers front office in 2003, serving with the team in various capacities until being named general manager of the Dolphins in 2026.

== Early life ==
Sullivan was born in 1976 or 1977 in Columbia, South Carolina. His father, Jerry Sullivan, was a long-time wide receivers coach in college and the National Football League (NFL). He started playing football in third grade and was a wide receiver. He first attended Catholic High School in Baton Rouge, Louisiana, where he caught passes from future NFL player Warrick Dunn. His father became a coach at Ohio State while Sullivan was at Catholic, and he thus moved in with friends.

Sullivan's grades declined and his father later enrolled him at Fork Union Military Academy in Virginia, where he played his junior and senior seasons. He was asked to begin playing cornerback and earned all-state honors as a junior after leading the state with nine interceptions, in addition to totaling 247 receiving yards. He then won all-state honors at wide receiver as a senior. He finished his stint at Fork Union with 37 receptions for 771 yards and eight touchdowns, being recruited by several major programs and committing to play college football for the South Carolina Gamecocks.

== College career ==
At South Carolina, Sullivan quit the team before the regular season in 1995. He later decided to return in 1996 as a walk-on, but had to sit out the season. He described his initial departure from South Carolina as "probably the worst mistake I've ever made in my life ... [but] I'm glad I got a second opportunity to come back here." In the 1997 season, he was a backup and totaled eight receptions for 110 yards.

Sullivan transferred to the NCAA Division II Gardner–Webb Runnin' Bulldogs in 1998. He played two seasons for the team and caught 43 passes as a senior in 1999, being selected all-conference. He graduated from Gardner–Webb in 2000 with a Bachelor of Arts degree and was later inducted into the school's Gallery of Distinguished Alumni.

== Executive career ==
=== Early career ===
Following his playing career, Sullivan worked a season as a student assistant and wide receivers coach at Gardner–Webb. He then became an employee at GMAC Insurance in Charlotte, North Carolina. He later became a sales rep for L.G. Balfour Company in Phoenix, Arizona.

=== Green Bay Packers ===
In 2003, Sullivan "missed football" and became a training camp intern for the Green Bay Packers of the NFL. The following year, he was hired by the Packers as an employee in the football operations department.

Sullivan spent several years as the Packers' National Football Scouting representative at the NFL Scouting Combine. In 2008, he became a scout for the Central Plains region, and after four seasons in that role, he became a Southeast region scout in 2012, a position he remained in through 2015. In 2016, he was promoted to director of college scouting. He became an important figure in the team's drafting and was described as the "right-hand man" to general manager Brian Gutekunst. In 2018, he was promoted again, to co-director of player personnel, along with Jon Wojciechowski. In 2022, he was promoted to vice president of player personnel.

In 2025, Sullivan was interviewed by several teams as a general manager candidate, including the Tennessee Titans, Las Vegas Raiders, and New York Jets.

=== Miami Dolphins ===
On January 9, 2026, Sullivan was named the general manager of the Miami Dolphins, replacing Chris Grier who was fired midway through the 2025 season. Ten days later, the Dolphins chose to pair Sullivan up with former Packers defensive coordinator, Jeff Hafley, who the team hired as their new head coach.

== Personal life ==
Sullivan's wife, Jennifer, is the daughter of coach Pete Hoener. They have three daughters together.

Jon-Eric's father is longtime pro and college football coach, Jerry Sullivan.
