= Jerry Sullivan =

American football coach (born 1943)

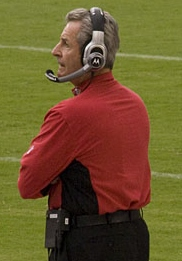

Personal information
- Born: July 13, 1943 (age 83); Miami, Florida, U.S.

Career information
- College: Florida State

Career history
- Kansas State (1971–1972) Wide receivers coach; Texas Tech (1973–1975) Wide receivers coach; South Carolina (1976–1982) Wide receivers coach; Indiana (1983) Assistant coach; LSU (1984–1990) Wide receivers coach; Ohio State (1991) Wide receivers coach; San Diego Chargers (1992–1996) Wide receivers coach; Detroit Lions (1997–2000) Wide receivers coach; Arizona Cardinals (2001–2002) Wide receivers coach; Arizona Cardinals (2003) Offensive coordinator; Miami Dolphins (2004) Wide receivers coach; San Francisco 49ers (2005–2010) Wide receivers coach; Jacksonville Jaguars (2012–2016) Wide receivers coach; LSU (2017) Consultant; LSU (2018) Pass game coordinator/senior offensive assistant; Arizona Cardinals (2019–2021) Offensive assistant
- Coaching profile at Pro Football Reference

Jerry Sullivan (born July 13, 1943) is an American former football coach who was an offensive assistant for the Arizona Cardinals of the National Football League (NFL). He spent 25 years in the NFL, 24 of them as a wide receivers coach. He also spent over 20-years as a college football coach. Jerry's son Jon-Eric Sullivan is the general manager of the Miami Dolphins.

== Collegiate coaching career ==
His first coaching job was with Kansas state in 1971. From 1973 to 1974, Sullivan was an assistant coach with the Texas Tech Red Raiders under head coach Jim Carlen. Sullivan then became wide receivers coach at South Carolina from 1976 to 1982. In 1983, he spent a one-season as the Indiana Hoosiers wide receivers coach. From 1984 to 1990, Sullivan moved to LSU as the wide receivers coach and he was also the wide receivers coach at Ohio State in 1991.

In 2017, Sullivan returned to the college ranks as a football consultant at LSU primarily focusing on wide receivers. On January 11, 2018, he moved to a full-time role on the coaching staff as senior offensive assistant/passing game coordinator. On January 9, 2019, Sullivan announced his retirement.

== Professional coaching career ==
In 1992, Sullivan moved to the professional coaching ranks with the NFL San Diego Chargers. He remained Chargers wide receivers coach until 1996. He then became the Detroit Lions wide receivers coach from 1997 to 2000. Starting in 2001, he was wide receivers coach with the Arizona Cardinals for two-seasons before being promoted to offensive coordinator for the 2003 NFL season. Sullivan then became the Miami Dolphins wide receivers coach in 2004 and from 2005 to 2010 he was the San Francisco 49ers wide receivers coach. From 2012 to 2016, he was the Jacksonville Jaguars wide receivers coach.

On August 12, 2019, it was announced Sullivan would rejoin the Cardinals as an offensive assistant and help coach the Cardinals' wide receivers. On May 10, 2022, it was announced Sullivan had retired again after the 2021 season.
