= 2026 NFL season =

American football season

Regular season
- Duration: September 9, 2026 – January 10, 2027

Playoffs
- Start date: January 16, 2027

Super Bowl LXI
- Date: February 14, 2027
- Site: SoFi Stadium, Inglewood, California

AFC teams: West, North, South, East
NFC teams: West, North, South, East

The 2026 NFL season is the 107th season of the National Football League (NFL). The regular season began on September 9, 2026, with reigning Super Bowl champion Seattle defeating New England in the NFL Kickoff Game, and will end on January 10, 2027. The playoffs will begin on January 16 and conclude with Super Bowl LXI at SoFi Stadium in Inglewood, California, on February 14.

== Player movement ==
The 2026 NFL league year and trading period began on March 11. Beginning March 9, teams were allowed to exercise options for 2026 on players with option clauses in their contracts, submit qualifying offers to their pending restricted free agents, and submit a Minimum Salary Tender to retain exclusive negotiating rights to their players with expiring 2025 contracts and fewer than three accrued seasons of free agent credit. Teams were required to be under the salary cap using the "top 51" definition (in which the 51 highest paid-players on the team's payroll must have a combined salary cap). On March 11, clubs were allowed to contact and begin contract negotiations with players whose contracts had expired and thus became unrestricted free agents.

This season's salary cap was set to $301.2 million per team, a $22 million per team increase from the previous season.

Positions key
Offense	Defense	Special teams
QB — Quarterback; RB — Running back; FB — Fullback; WR — Wide receiver; TE — Tight end; OL — Offensive lineman; T — Tackle; G — Guard; C — Center	DL — Defensive lineman; DT — Defensive tackle (Note: Includes nose tackle (NT)); DE — Defensive end; EDGE — Edge rusher; LB — Linebacker (Note: Includes middle linebacker (MLB/MIKE), weakside linebacker (WILL), strongside linebacker (SAM), off-ball linebacker, and outside linebacker (OLB)); DB — Defensive back; CB — Cornerback; S — Safety (Note: Includes free safety (FS) and strong safety (SS))	K — Kicker (Note: Also known as a placekicker (PK)); P — Punter; LS — Long snapper; RS — Return specialist (Note: Includes kickoff and punt returners)

=== Free agency ===
Free agency began on March 11. Notable players to change teams include:

- Quarterbacks Kirk Cousins (Atlanta to Las Vegas), Kyler Murray (Arizona to Minnesota), Tua Tagovailoa (Miami to Atlanta), and Malik Willis (Green Bay to Miami)
- Running backs Rico Dowdle (Carolina to Pittsburgh), Travis Etienne (Jacksonville to New Orleans), Kenneth Gainwell (Pittsburgh to Tampa Bay), Najee Harris (Los Angeles Chargers to New York Giants), Patrick Ricard (Baltimore to New York Giants), and Kenneth Walker III (Seattle to Kansas City)
- Wide receivers Keenan Allen (Los Angeles Chargers to Indianapolis), Stefon Diggs (New England to Washington), Romeo Doubs (Green Bay to New England), Mike Evans (Tampa Bay to San Francisco), Jauan Jennings (San Francisco to Minnesota), Wan'Dale Robinson (New York Giants to Tennessee), and Deebo Samuel (Washington to San Francisco).
- Tight ends Isaiah Likely (Baltimore to New York Giants), David Njoku (Cleveland to Los Angeles Chargers), Jonnu Smith (Pittsburgh to Green Bay), Darren Waller (Miami to Carolina), Daniel Bellinger (New York Giants to Tennessee), and Noah Fant (Cincinnati to New Orleans)
- Offensive linemen David Edwards (Buffalo to New Orleans), DJ Humphries (Los Angeles Rams to Washington), Elgton Jenkins (Green Bay to Cleveland), Zion Johnson (Los Angeles Chargers to Cleveland), Tyler Linderbaum (Baltimore to Las Vegas), Dylan Parham (Las Vegas to New York Jets), Isaac Seumalo (Pittsburgh to Arizona), Wyatt Teller (Cleveland to Houston), Alijah Vera-Tucker (New York Jets to New England), and Rasheed Walker (Green Bay to Carolina)
- Defensive linemen Jonathan Allen (Minnesota to Cincinnati), Calais Campbell (Arizona to Baltimore), Jadeveon Clowney (Dallas to Houston), John Franklin-Myers (Denver to Tennessee), Trey Hendrickson (Cincinnati to Baltimore), Dre'Mont Jones (Baltimore to New England), Joseph Ossai (Cincinnati to New York Jets), Odafe Oweh (Los Angeles Chargers to Washington), DJ Reader (Detriot to New York Giants), A'Shawn Robinson (Carolina to Tampa Bay), Jerry Tillery (Kansas City to Indianapolis), Kwity Paye (Indianaoplis to Las Vegas), and Za'Darius Smith (Philadelphia to Atlanta)
- Linebackers Akeem Davis-Gaither (Arizona to Indianapolis), Christian Harris (Houston to Atlanta), Alex Anzalone (Detroit to Tampa Bay), Devin Bush Jr. (Cleveland to Chicago), Bradley Chubb (Miami to Buffalo), Demario Davis (New Orleans to New York Jets), Nakobe Dean (Philadelphia to Las Vegas), Tremaine Edmunds (Chicago to New York Giants), Kaden Elliss (Atlanta to New Orleans), Devin Lloyd (Jacksonville to Carolina), Boye Mafe (Seattle to Cincinnati), Von Miller (Washington to Dallas), Jaelan Phillips (Philadelphia to Carolina), Quay Walker (Green Bay to Las Vegas), Devin White (Las Vegas to Detroit), Bobby Okereke (New York Giants to Carolina), Quincy Williams (New York Jets to Cleveland), and Leo Chenal (Kansas City to Washington)
- Defensive backs Reed Blankenship (Philadelphia to Houston), Jaquan Brisker (Chicago to Pittsburgh), Coby Bryant (Seattle to Chicago), Kevin Byard (Chicago to New England), Bryan Cook (Kansas City to Cincinnati), Nick Cross (Indianapolis to Washington), Jamel Dean (Tampa Bay to Pittsburgh), Trevon Diggs (Green Bay to Seattle), Cobie Durant (Los Angeles Rams to Dallas), Cor'Dale Flott (New York Giants to Tennessee), L'Jarius Sneed (Tennessee to Kansas City), Alontae Taylor (New Orleans to Tennessee), Ja'Sir Taylor (New York Jets to Cincinnati), Cam Taylor-Britt (Cincinnati to Indianapolis), Jalen Thompson (Arizona to Dallas), Jaylen Watson (Kansas City to Los Angeles Rams), Joshua Williams (Kansas City to Tennessee) Tariq Woolen (Seattle to Philadelphia), and Nahshon Wright (Chicago to New York Jets)
- Kickers Daniel Carlson (Las Vegas to New Orleans) and Nick Folk (New York Jets to Atlanta)
- Punters Jake Bailey (Miami to Atlanta), Johnny Hekker (Tennessee to Minnesota), Jordan Stout (Baltimore to New York Giants), Tommy Townsend (Houston to Tennessee), and Ryan Wright (Minnesota to New Orleans)

=== Trades ===
The following notable trades were made during the 2026 league year:

- March 11: Las Vegas traded QB Geno Smith and a 2026 seventh-round selection to the New York Jets in exchange for a 2026 sixth-round selection.
- March 11: Detroit traded RB David Montgomery to Houston in exchange for C Juice Scruggs, 2026 fourth-round and 2027 seventh-round selections.
- March 11: Chicago traded WR D. J. Moore and a 2026 fifth-round selection to Buffalo in exchange for a 2026 second-round selection.
- March 11: Kansas City traded CB Trent McDuffie to the Los Angeles Rams in exchange for their 2026 first- (No. 29), fifth-, and sixth-round selections and a 2027 third-round selection.
- March 11: Miami traded S Minkah Fitzpatrick to the New York Jets in exchange for a 2026 seventh-round selection.
- March 11: Green Bay traded DT Colby Wooden to Indianapolis in exchange for LB Zaire Franklin.
- March 11: Green Bay traded DE Rashan Gary to Dallas in exchange for a 2027 fourth-round selection.
- March 11: Tennessee traded DT T'Vondre Sweat to the New York Jets in exchange for DE Jermaine Johnson II.
- March 11: Dallas traded DT Osa Odighizuwa to San Francisco in exchange for a 2026 third-round selection.
- March 11: Buffalo traded CB Taron Johnson and a 2026 seventh-round selection to Las Vegas in exchange for a 2026 sixth-round selection.
- March 18: Miami traded WR Jaylen Waddle and a 2026 fourth-round selection to Denver in exchange for a 2026 first- (No. 30), third-, and fourth-round selections.
- March 20: Philadelphia traded S Sydney Brown and 2026 fourth- and sixth-round selections to Atlanta in exchange for 2026 fourth- and sixth-round selections.
- March 24: Carolina traded QB Andy Dalton to Philadelphia in exchange for a 2027 seventh-round selection.
- April 17: Atlanta traded DT Ruke Orhorhoro to Jacksonville in exchange for DT Maason Smith.
- April 19: The New York Giants traded DT Dexter Lawrence to Cincinnati in exchange for a 2026 first-round selection (No. 10).
- April 24: Minnesota traded LB Jonathan Greenard to Philadelphia in exchange for a 2026 third-round selection and a 2027 third-round selection.
- June 1: Cleveland traded DE Myles Garrett to the Los Angeles Rams in exchange for DE Jared Verse, a 2027 first-round selection, a 2028 second-round selection and a 2029 third-round selection.
- June 1: Philadelphia traded WR A. J. Brown to New England in exchange for a 2027 fifth-round selection and a 2028 first-round selection.
- August 23: New Orleans traded LB Deion Jones to San Francisco in exchange for RB Zamir White.
- August 24: New England traded WR Kayshon Boutte to Houston in exchange for S Jaylen Reed and a 2028 seventh-round selection.
- August 27: Miami traded WR Tutu Atwell to the Los Angeles Rams in exchange for RB Jarquez Hunter.
- August 30: Pittsburgh traded OT Broderick Jones and a 2027 fourth-round selection to Dallas in exchange for 2027 third- and sixth-round selections.
- August 30: Chicago traded DT Gervon Dexter to Atlanta in exchange for CB Clark Phillips III and a 2027 fifth-round selection.
- October 1: Pittsburgh traded CB Joey Porter Jr. to Dallas in exchange for a 2027 sixth-round selection and a 2028 second-round selection.
- October 7: Philadelphia traded C Cam Jurgens and a 2027 seventh-round selection to Baltimore in exchange for a 2027 fifth-round selection and a 2028 second-round selection.
- October 12: Arizona traded WR Marvin Harrison Jr. and 2027 sixth-round selection to Houston in exchange for 2027 second and seventh-round selections.
- October 27: Indianapolis traded G Quenton Nelson to Seattle in exchange for a 2027 third-round selection and a 2028 fifth-round selection.
- October 27: Indianapolis traded DT DeForest Buckner to San Francisco in exchange for a 2027 fourth-round selection.
- October 29: Tennessee traded DT Jeffery Simmons and a 2028 fifth-round selection to Chicago in exchange for a 2027 first-round selection and 2028 first and fourth-round selections.
- November 6: Arizona traded QB Jacoby Brissett and a 2027 fifth-round selection to Baltimore in exchange for a 2027 fourth-round selection and a 2028 seventh-round selection.
- November 9: Atlanta traded S Jessie Bates to Jacksonville in exchange for a 2027 second-round selection and a 2028 fifth-round selection.
- November 9: Philadelphia traded DT Jordan Davis to Jacksonville in exchange for a 2027 first-round selection and a 2029 second-round selection.
- November 10: Indianapolis traded WR Keenan Allen to San Francisco in exchange for a 2027 sixth-round selection.
- November 10: Tennessee traded S Amani Hooker and a 2027 fifth-round selection to Buffalo in exchange for a 2027 second-round selection.
- November 10: Las Vegas traded QB Kirk Cousins to Minnesota in exchange for a 2027 third-round selection.
- November 10: Indianapolis traded WR Josh Downs and a 2027 seventh-round selection to Kansas City in exchange for 2027 fourth- and fifth-round selections.
- November 10: Atlanta traded C Ryan Neuzil to Baltimore in exchange for G Andrew Vorhees and a 2028 sixth-round selection.

=== Retirements ===
Notable retirements

- G Joel Bitonio – Seven-time Pro Bowler and five-time All-Pro (two first-team, three second-team). Played for Cleveland during his entire 12-year career.
- RB Nick Chubb - Four-time Pro Bowler and two-time second-team All-Pro. Played for Cleveland and Houston during his eight-year career.
- LB Lavonte David – One-time Pro Bowler, three-time All-Pro (one first-team, two second-team), and Super Bowl LV champion. Played for Tampa Bay during his entire 14-year career.
- CB Stephon Gilmore – Five-time Pro Bowler, two-time first-team All-Pro, Super Bowl LIII champion, and 2019 Defensive Player of the Year. Played for Buffalo, New England, Carolina, Indianapolis, Dallas and Minnesota during his 13-year career.
- WR T. Y. Hilton – Four-time Pro Bowler. Played for Indianapolis and Dallas during his 11-year career.
- CB Xavien Howard – Four-time Pro Bowler and two-time All-Pro (one first-team, one second-team). Played for Miami and Indianapolis during his nine-year career.
- C Ryan Kelly – Four-time Pro Bowler and one-time second-team All-Pro. Played for Indianapolis and Minnesota during his 10-year career.
- QB Philip Rivers – Eight-time Pro Bowler and 2013 NFL Comeback Player of the Year. Played for the San Diego/Los Angeles Chargers and Indianapolis during his 18-year career.
- S Justin Simmons – Two-time Pro Bowler and four-time second-team All-Pro. Played for Denver and Atlanta during his nine-year career.
- CB Darius Slay – Six-time Pro Bowler, one-time first-team All-Pro, and Super Bowl LIX champion. Played for Detroit, Philadelphia and Pittsburgh during his 13-year career.
- QB Russell Wilson – Ten-time Pro Bowler, one-time second-team All-Pro, Super Bowl XLVIII champion, and 2020 Walter Payton Man of the Year. Played for Seattle, Denver, Pittsburgh and the New York Giants during his 14-year career.

Other retirements

- Hakeem Adeniji
- Jaire Alexander
- David Bell
- Nick Bellore
- Miles Boykin
- Bradley Bozeman
- Teddy Bridgewater
- Jake Camarda
- Parris Campbell
- D. J. Chark
- Will Clapp
- Trystan Colon
- Drew Dalman
- DJ Davidson
- Demetric Felton
- Myles Gaskin
- Brandon Graham
- Jakeem Grant
- Will Grier
- C. J. Goodwin
- Jaren Hall
- C. J. Ham
- Johnathan Hankins
- Rob Havenstein
- Taylor Heinicke
- Bryce Huff
- Hayden Hurst
- Dane Jackson
- Kareem Jackson
- Jerry Jacobs
- Marquette King
- Kendall Lamm
- Rick Lovato
- Reuben Lowery
- Cassius Marsh
- Kaleb McGary
- Alex McGough
- Joshua Miles
- Dax Milne
- Le'Veon Moss
- Kai Nacua
- Yosh Nijman
- Efe Obada
- Pat O'Connor
- Andrus Peat
- Nathan Peterman
- Ja'Lynn Polk
- LaBryan Ray
- Allen Robinson
- Kenny Robinson
- Shilo Sanders
- Boston Scott
- Dan Skipper
- Donovan Smith
- Ryan Tannehill
- Trent Taylor
- Sam Tecklenburg
- Adam Thielen
- Joe Tryon-Shoyinka
- C. J. Uzomah
- Travis Vokolek
- Anthony Walker Jr.
- P. J. Walker
- Levi Wallace
- Markees Watts
- Sam Webb
- Squirrel White
- Darious Williams
- Logan Wilson
- Ahkello Witherspoon
- Robert Woods

=== Draft ===
The 2026 NFL draft took place in Pittsburgh, Pennsylvania from April 23–25, with events held at Acrisure Stadium, Point State Park, and other venues throughout the city. Las Vegas, by virtue of having the worst record in 2025, held the first overall selection and selected Indiana quarterback Fernando Mendoza.

The amount of time allotted for each team to make a selection in the first round was reduced from ten to eight minutes beginning with the 2026 draft.

== 2026 deaths ==
=== Pro Football Hall of Fame members ===
Raymond Berry
Berry played 13 seasons in the NFL as a wide receiver for the Baltimore Colts, and spent over three decades as a coach, including six seasons as the head coach of the New England Patriots. He was elected to the Hall of Fame in 1973. He was a six-time All-Pro (three first-team, three second-team), six-time Pro Bowler, and two-time NFL champion (1958 and 1959). He died May 25, age 93.
Mike Ditka
Ditka played 12 seasons in the NFL as a tight end for the Chicago Bears, Philadelphia Eagles, and Dallas Cowboys and spent two decades as a coach, including fourteen seasons as the head coach of the Bears and New Orleans Saints. He was elected to the Hall of Fame in 1988. As a player, he was a five-time All-Pro (two first-team, three second-team), five-time Pro Bowler, and Super Bowl champion (Super Bowl VI). As a coach, he was a two-time AP NFL Coach of the Year (1985, 1988) and two-time Super Bowl champion (Super Bowl XII and Super Bowl XX), the latter as head coach of the Bears. He died October 9, age 86.
Sonny Jurgensen
Jurgensen played 18 seasons in the NFL as a quarterback for the Philadelphia Eagles and Washington Redskins and was elected to the Hall of Fame in 1983. He was a four-time All-Pro (two first-team, two second-team), five-time Pro Bowler, and won the 1960 NFL Championship with the Eagles. He died February 6, age 91.

=== Active personnel ===
Janice McNair
McNair was an owner and co-founder of the Houston Texans, assuming control of the team in 2018, following the death of her husband Bob McNair, until 2024, when she transferred principal ownership duties to her son Cal. She died on July 14, age 89.
Rondale Moore
Moore was a wide receiver for the Arizona Cardinals, Atlanta Falcons and Minnesota Vikings for five seasons. He died on February 21, age 25.

== Rule changes ==
The following rule changes were adopted at the NFL Owners' Meeting on March 31, 2026:

- The kickoff rules that were implemented in 2024 were modified for the second consecutive year:
  - Onside kicks are permitted by either team at any time, reinstating pre-2024 rule. In 2024, they were restricted to the fourth quarter, and only by the trailing team. In 2025, they were allowed at any time, but only by the trailing team.
  - If a kickoff is moved to the 50-yard line due to one or more penalties, a touchback will place the ball at the receiving team's 20-yard line instead of the 35-yard line.
  - The formation rules of the receiving team were adjusted to require five players to have their front foot on the setup line. Previously, six players were required at the setup line.
- An expansion to the Instant Replay/Replay Assist rules:
  - League officials can consult with the on-field officials and the Replay Assistant to initiate a review about whether a player should be ejected for a flagrant act even if no penalty flag had been thrown.
  - The head coach is allowed to designate a sideline assistant to handle the duty of throwing the red challenge flag to initiate an instant replay review. Previously, only the head coach was permitted to throw the challenge flag. This rule change was made just prior to the preseason.
- Five on-field penalties with a higher likelihood to result in player injuries have been identified. Any player who commits three offenses of the five penalties will receive a one-game suspension. All players begin the 2026 season with a "clean slate", but violations will carry over to future seasons. The five offenses are as follows:
  - Hip drop tackle
  - Horse-collar tackle
  - Launching
  - Hit on a defenseless player
  - Blindside block
- During field goal and extra point attempts, stadiums with video boards located in the endzones must display the same images for both kicking teams. The image can be either a static image or the "All-22" view (from the same direction). This eliminates stadiums from displaying images – namely a "reverse All-22" image – that could create optical illusions from opposing teams' kickers. This rule was announced by memo on September 7, 2026.

== Preseason ==
Carolina defeated Arizona in the Pro Football Hall of Fame Game on August 6. Arizona was represented in the Hall's class of 2026 by wide receiver Larry Fitzgerald, and Carolina was represented by linebacker Luke Kuechly.

== Regular season ==
The season is to be played over an 18-week schedule, beginning on September 9. Each of the league's 32 teams plays 17 games, with one bye week. The regular season is scheduled to end on January 10, 2027; all games during the final weekend will be intra-division games, as it has been since 2010.

Each team will play the other three teams in its own division twice, one game against each of the four teams from a division in its own conference, one game against each of the four teams from a division in the other conference, one game against each of the remaining two teams in its conference that finished in the same position in their respective divisions the previous season (e.g., the team that finished fourth in its division would play all three other teams in its conference that also finished fourth in their divisions), and one game against a team in another division in the other conference that also finished in the same position in their respective division the previous season.

The division pairings for 2026 are as follows:

Four intra-conference games
AFC East vs AFC West
AFC North vs AFC South
NFC East vs NFC West
NFC North vs NFC South

Four interconference games
AFC East vs NFC North
AFC North vs NFC South
AFC South vs NFC East
AFC West vs NFC West

Interconference game by 2025 position
AFC East at NFC West
AFC North at NFC East
AFC South at NFC North
AFC West at NFC South

Highlights of the 2026 season are planned to include the following:

- NFL Kickoff Game: The season began with the Kickoff Game on September 9, with a rematch of last season's Super Bowl LX, featuring New England at defending champion Seattle. Seattle won the game.
- NFL International Series: A record of nine international games are scheduled to be played this season:

- San Francisco at the Los Angeles Rams on September 11 (Note: September 10 in U.S. time zones) at the Melbourne Cricket Ground in Melbourne. This was the first regular season game in Australia. San Francisco won.
- Baltimore at Dallas on September 27 at the Maracanã Stadium in Rio de Janeiro, Brazil. Baltimore won.
- Indianapolis at Washington on October 4 at Tottenham Hotspur Stadium in London. Indianapolis won.
- Philadelphia at Jacksonville on October 11 at Tottenham Hotspur Stadium in London. Jacksonville won.
- Houston at Jacksonville on October 18 at Wembley Stadium. Houston won.
- Pittsburgh at New Orleans on October 25 at the Stade de France in Paris. This was the first regular-season game in France. Pittsburgh won.
- Cincinnati at Atlanta on November 8 at Bernabéu in Madrid, Spain. Cincinnati won.
- New England at Detroit on November 15 at Allianz Arena in Munich, Germany. Detroit won.
- Minnesota at San Francisco on November 22 at Estadio Azteca in Mexico City, Mexico.

- NFL on Thanksgiving: Five games will be held surrounding the Thanksgiving holiday on November 25–27:
  - For the first time, a game will be held on the day before Thanksgiving, Wednesday November 25 with Green Bay at the Los Angeles Rams.
  - Thanksgiving Day, November 26, includes the traditional Thanksgiving Day afternoon games with Chicago at Detroit and Philadelphia at Dallas. The primetime game features Kansas City at Buffalo.
  - The Friday afternoon game features Denver at Pittsburgh on November 27.
- NFL on Christmas: As Christmas Day lands on a Friday in 2026, four games will be held surrounding the Christmas holiday on December 24–25:
  - One game will be held on Christmas Eve, Thursday December 24, with Houston at Philadelphia in primetime.
  - Three games will be held on Christmas Day, Friday December 25: Green Bay at Chicago and Buffalo at Denver in the afternoon, and the Los Angeles Rams at Seattle in primetime.

=== Flexible scheduling rules ===
This is the fourth season of the league's flexible scheduling system that includes Thursday Night Football, Sunday Night Football, Monday Night Football, and cross-flexing (switching) of Sunday afternoon games between CBS and Fox.

Flexible scheduling for TNF games remain the same as the previous season: only two games can be flexed between weeks 13 and 17, teams are not required to flex into TNF more than once, teams are not allowed to play more than two Thursday games on short rest during the season, and teams cannot play multiple away TNF games during the season without their approval, and the league has a deadline of 21 days to flex any eligible game into TNF.

The other flexible scheduling rules remained the same as in 2025. Any Monday Night Football game will be allowed to be flexed between weeks 12 and 17; the league is required to announce its rescheduling no later than 12 days before the contests. For Sunday Night Football, no more than two games can be flexed between weeks 5 and 10, while any game between weeks 11 to 17 could be flexed; the league will be required to give weeks 5 to 13 SNF games a 12-day notice, and weeks 14 to 17 a 6-day notice. All Week 18 games will be initially listed as "TBD", with the league announcing its schedule after Week 17 games are completed.

Additionally, CBS and Fox will have the ability to protect games from being moved (except for Week 18 contests), either from a change to another network or a change of the time slot. When the initial season schedule was created, the two networks selected a limited number of games involving a specific number of teams from their respective conference. Otherwise, every game can be initially scheduled on any network regardless of conference. After the season starts, each network is allowed to protect one game each week from being flexed.

=== Scheduling changes ===
Week 5:

- The Chicago–Green Bay game was moved from 4:25 p.m. ET to 1:00 p.m. ET, remaining on Fox.

Week 9:

- The Detroit–Miami game was cross-flexed from Fox to CBS, remaining at 1:00 p.m. ET.
- The Las Vegas–San Francisco game was cross-flexed from 4:05 p.m. ET on CBS to 4:25 p.m. ET on Fox.

Week 11:

- The Miami–Buffalo game was cross-flexed from Fox to CBS, trading network slots with the Tampa Bay–Detroit game; both games remaining at 1:00 p.m. ET.
- The Jacksonville–New York Giants game was moved from 1:00 p.m. ET. to 4:25 p.m. ET, trading time slots with the Pittsburgh–Philadelphia game; both games remaining on CBS.

Week 12:

- The Las Vegas–Cleveland game, originally scheduled for 1:00 p.m. ET on Fox, was flexed into NBC Sunday Night Football at 8:20 p.m. ET, replacing the originally scheduled New England–Los Angeles Chargers game, which was moved to 4:05 p.m. ET on CBS.
- The Tennessee–Jacksonville game was moved from 4:05 p.m. ET on CBS to 1:00 p.m. ET on Fox.

Week 16:

- Four games have been set aside to potentially be moved into a doubleheader on Saturday, December 26: Tampa Bay–Atlanta, Cincinnati–Indianapolis, Washington–Minnesota, and Carolina–Pittsburgh. Two of those games will be moved to Saturday at 4:30 and 8:00 p.m. ET, both on NFL Network/NFL+. The remaining two games will be played on Sunday, December 27 (subject to additional flexing).

Week 17:

- Four games have been set aside to potentially be moved into a doubleheader on Saturday, January 2: Washington–Jacksonville, Kansas City–Los Angeles Chargers, Denver–New England, and Los Angeles Rams–Tampa Bay. Two of those games will be moved to Saturday at 4:30 p.m. ET on NBC and 8:00 p.m. ET on Peacock. The remaining two games will be played on Sunday, January 3 (subject to additional flexing).

Week 18:

- All Week 18 games are initially listed with a kickoff time of "TBD". Three games with playoff implications are planned to be moved to Saturday, January 9 at 1:00 p.m. ET on Netflix, and 4:30 and 8:00 p.m. ET on ABC/ESPN. Another game with playoff implications will be selected as the final Sunday Night Football game on January 10 at 8:20 p.m. ET on NBC. All remaining games will then be scheduled on Sunday afternoon at either 1:00 or 4:25 p.m. ET on either CBS or Fox.

== Regular season standings ==
=== Division ===
AFC East
	W	L	T	PCT	DIV	CONF	PF	PA	STK
Buffalo Bills	8	1	0	.889	1–1	5–1	287	199	W5
New England Patriots	5	5	0	.500	3–0	5–1	221	242	L2
New York Jets	2	8	0	.200	0–3	2–5	194	254	L5
Miami Dolphins	1	8	0	.111	1–1	1–5	148	224	L3

AFC North
	W	L	T	PCT	DIV	CONF	PF	PA	STK
Cincinnati Bengals	7	2	0	.778	2–1	5–2	278	193	W5
Pittsburgh Steelers	6	3	0	.667	2–2	3–3	198	182	L1
Cleveland Browns	6	4	0	.600	2–1	4–3	188	220	W1
Baltimore Ravens	4	6	0	.400	0–2	2–5	209	259	L5

AFC South
	W	L	T	PCT	DIV	CONF	PF	PA	STK
Jacksonville Jaguars	7	2	0	.778	2–1	6–2	269	144	W3
Houston Texans	4	6	0	.400	3–1	4–4	259	222	W1
Indianapolis Colts	3	8	0	.273	1–3	2–6	211	297	L1
Tennessee Titans	1	8	0	.111	1–2	1–6	167	239	L3

AFC West
	W	L	T	PCT	DIV	CONF	PF	PA	STK
Kansas City Chiefs	7	2	0	.778	3–1	6–1	237	156	W2
Denver Broncos	7	2	0	.778	2–1	3–1	198	186	W5
Las Vegas Raiders	4	6	0	.400	1–1	3–3	251	289	L2
Los Angeles Chargers	1	8	0	.111	0–3	1–5	144	239	W1

NFC East
	W	L	T	PCT	DIV	CONF	PF	PA	STK
New York Giants	5	3	1	.611	2–1–1	3–3–1	203	196	L1
Dallas Cowboys	4	6	0	.400	2–1	2–5	286	282	L1
Washington Commanders	3	5	1	.389	2–2–1	3–4–1	196	223	W1
Philadelphia Eagles	2	7	0	.222	1–3	1–6	148	221	L7

NFC North
	W	L	T	PCT	DIV	CONF	PF	PA	STK
Detroit Lions	7	2	0	.778	2–0	4–1	257	199	W5
Minnesota Vikings	7	2	0	.778	3–1	5–1	176	126	W1
Chicago Bears	7	2	0	.778	0–2	5–2	241	184	W4
Green Bay Packers	6	4	0	.600	1–3	4–4	226	221	L1

NFC South
	W	L	T	PCT	DIV	CONF	PF	PA	STK
Carolina Panthers	4	5	0	.444	2–1	4–3	219	236	W1
Tampa Bay Buccaneers	3	6	0	.333	2–0	3–3	202	178	L1
New Orleans Saints	3	6	0	.333	0–2	1–4	202	236	L1
Atlanta Falcons	3	7	0	.300	1–2	3–3	201	258	L3

NFC West
	W	L	T	PCT	DIV	CONF	PF	PA	STK
San Francisco 49ers	8	1	0	.889	3–0	5–1	281	196	W2
Seattle Seahawks	6	4	0	.600	2–1	2–3	223	175	W2
Los Angeles Rams	6	4	0	.600	1–2	4–2	248	187	W4
Arizona Cardinals	3	7	0	.300	1–4	2–6	184	289	L2

=== Conference ===
AFC
Seed	Team	Division	W	L	T	PCT	DIV	CONF	SOS	SOV	STK
Division leaders
1	Buffalo Bills	East	8	1	0	.889	1–1	5–1	.460	.455	W5
2 (Note: Kansas City wins tie break over Jacksonville and Cincinnati based on conference record.) (Note: Kansas City wins tie break over Denver based on division record.)	Kansas City Chiefs	West	7	2	0	.778	3–1	6–1	.391	.309	W2
3 (Note: Jacksonville wins tie break over Cincinnati based on head-to-head victory.)	Jacksonville Jaguars	South	7	2	0	.778	2–1	6–2	.448	.412	W3
4	Cincinnati Bengals	North	7	2	0	.778	2–1	5–2	.417	.333	W5
Wild cards
5	Denver Broncos	West	7	2	0	.778	2–1	3–1	.583	.515	W5
6	Pittsburgh Steelers	North	6	3	0	.667	2–2	3–3	.494	.431	L1
7	Cleveland Browns	North	6	4	0	.600	2–1	4–3	.430	.393	W1
In the hunt
8	New England Patriots	East	5	5	0	.500	3–0	5–1	.574	.447	L2
9 (Note: Houston and Las Vegas win tie break over Baltimore based on conference record.) (Note: Houston wins tie break over Las Vegas based on strength of victory.)	Houston Texans	South	4	6	0	.400	3–1	4–4	.474	.316	W1
10	Las Vegas Raiders	West	4	6	0	.400	1–1	3–3	.500	.189	L2
11	Baltimore Ravens	North	4	6	0	.400	0–2	2–5	.453	.275	L5
12	Indianapolis Colts	South	3	8	0	.273	1–3	2–6	.471	.304	L1
13	New York Jets	East	2	8	0	.200	0–3	2–5	.553	.368	L5
14 (Note: LA Chargers and Miami win tie break over Tennessee based on conference record.) (Note: LA Chargers wins tie break over Miami based on strength of victory.)	Los Angeles Chargers	West	1	8	0	.111	0–3	1–5	.563	.400	W1
15	Miami Dolphins	East	1	8	0	.111	1–1	1–5	.581	.200	L3
16	Tennessee Titans	South	1	8	0	.111	1–2	1–6	.466	.273	L3

Tiebreaker rules (Note: When breaking ties for three or more teams under the NFL's rules, they are first broken within divisions, then comparing only the highest ranked remaining team from each division.)

NFC
Seed	Team	Division	W	L	T	PCT	DIV	CONF	SOS	SOV	STK
Division leaders
1	San Francisco 49ers	West	8	1	0	.889	3–0	5–1	.431	.448	W2
2 (Note: Detroit wins tie break over Minnesota and Chicago based on head-to-head record.)	Detroit Lions	North	7	2	0	.778	2–0	4–1	.459	.403	W5
3	New York Giants	East	5	3	1	.611	2–1–1	3–3–1	.353	.292	L1
4	Carolina Panthers	South	4	5	0	.444	2–1	4–3	.524	.405	W1
Wild cards
5 (Note: Minnesota wins tie break over Chicago based on head-to-head victory.)	Minnesota Vikings	North	7	2	0	.778	3–1	5–1	.518	.433	W1
6	Chicago Bears	North	7	2	0	.778	0–2	5–2	.442	.373	W4
7 (Note: Green Bay wins tie break over Seattle based on conference record. Division tie break was initially used to eliminate LA Rams (see below).)	Green Bay Packers	North	6	4	0	.600	1–3	4–4	.521	.439	L1
In the hunt
8 (Note: Seattle wins tie break over LA Rams based on division record.)	Seattle Seahawks	West	6	4	0	.600	2–1	2–3	.516	.397	W2
9	Los Angeles Rams	West	6	4	0	.600	1–2	4–2	.484	.339	W4
10	Dallas Cowboys	East	4	6	0	.400	2–1	2–5	.438	.321	L1
11	Washington Commanders	East	3	5	1	.389	2–2–1	3–4–1	.488	.482	W1
12 (Note: Tampa Bay wins tie break over New Orleans based on division record.)	Tampa Bay Buccaneers	South	3	6	0	.333	2–0	3–3	.588	.379	L1
13	New Orleans Saints	South	3	6	0	.333	0–2	1–4	.547	.534	L1
14 (Note: Atlanta wins tie break over Arizona based on conference record.)	Atlanta Falcons	South	3	7	0	.300	1–2	3–3	.598	.607	L3
15	Arizona Cardinals	West	3	7	0	.300	1–4	2–6	.595	.379	L2
16	Philadelphia Eagles	East	2	7	0	.222	1–3	1–6	.500	.250	L7

Tiebreaker rules (Note: When breaking ties for three or more teams under the NFL's rules, they are first broken within divisions, then comparing only the highest ranked remaining team from each division.)

== Postseason ==
The 2026 playoffs are scheduled to begin with the Wild Card Round from January 16–18, 2027, with three games played in each conference. In the Divisional Round, scheduled for January 23–24, the top seed in the conference will play the lowest remaining seed and the other two remaining teams play each other. The winners of those games advance to the Conference Championship games scheduled for January 31. Super Bowl LXI is scheduled for February 14 at SoFi Stadium in Inglewood, California. This will be the latest date the NFL has held a Super Bowl game and the first time the game is scheduled to be held on Valentine's Day.

== Awards ==
=== Players of the Week / Month ===
The following were named the top performers during the season:

Week / Month	Offensive		Defensive		Special Teams	
Week / Month	AFC	NFC	AFC	NFC	AFC	NFC
1	Kenneth Walker III RB (Kansas City)	D'Andre Swift RB (Chicago)	T. J. Watt OLB (Pittsburgh)	Zack Baun LB (Philadelphia)	Evan McPherson K (Cincinnati)	Simi Fehoko WR (Arizona)
2	Josh Allen QB (Buffalo)	Brock Purdy QB (San Francisco)	Hezekiah Masses CB (Las Vegas)	Devin Lloyd LB (Carolina)	Andre Szmyt K (Cleveland)	Isaiah Rodgers CB (Minnesota)
3	Brock Bowers TE (Las Vegas)	Bijan Robinson RB (Atlanta)	Talanoa Hufanga S (Denver)	Sonny Styles LB (Washington)	Tyler Loop K (Baltimore)	Myles Price WR (Minnesota)
Sept.	Kenneth Walker III RB (Kansas City)	Brock Purdy QB (San Francisco)	Greg Rousseau LB (Buffalo)	Jevón Holland S (NY Giants)	Evan McPherson K (Cincinnati)	Myles Price WR (Minnesota)
4	Drake Maye QB (New England)	Tetairoa McMillan WR (Carolina)	Foyesade Oluokun LB (Jacksonville)	Deonte Banks CB (NY Giants)	Matt Araiza P (Kansas City)	Will Reichard K (Minnesota)
5	Jaylen Warren RB (Pittsburgh)	Jahmyr Gibbs RB (Detroit)	David Bailey DE (NY Jets)	Byron Murphy CB (Minnesota)	Gregory Rousseau DE (Buffalo)	Corliss Waitman P (San Francisco)
6	C. J. Stroud QB (Houston)	Caleb Williams QB (Chicago)	Jalen Ramsey CB (Pittsburgh)	Martin Emerson CB (New Orleans)	Julius Chestnut RB (Tennessee)	Chad Ryland K (Arizona)
7	Joe Burrow QB (Cincinnati)	Michael Penix Jr. QB (Atlanta)	Alex Singleton LB (Denver)	Blake Cashman LB (Minnesota)	Ryan Rehkow P (Cincinnati)	D. J. Wonnum DE (Detroit)
Oct.	Drake Maye QB (New England)	Malik Nabers WR (NY Giants)	Alex Singleton LB (Denver)	Evan Williams S (Green Bay)	Kaʻimi Fairbairn K (Houston)	Chase McLaughlin K (Tampa Bay)
8	Tee Higgins WR (Cincinnati)	Tyler Allgeier RB (Arizona)	Rayuan Lane III S (Jacksonville)	Alex Anzalone LB (Tampa Bay)	Dylan Laube RB (Las Vegas)	Jack Fox P (Detroit)
9	C. J. Stroud QB (Houston)	Jordan Love QB (Green Bay)	Chris Jones DT (Kansas City)	Arvell Reese LB (NY Giants)	Cam Little K (Jacksonville)	Jake Bates K (Detroit)
10	Joe Burrow QB (Cincinnati)	Jahmyr Gibbs RB (Detroit)	Justin Walley CB (Indianapolis)	Jaelan Phillips LB (Carolina)	Cam Little K (Jacksonville)	Tory Horton WR (Seattle)

Week	FedEx Air & Ground Players of the Week		Pepsi Zero Sugar Rookie of the Week	Fantasy Performance of the Week
1	Josh Allen QB (Buffalo)	Caleb Williams QB (Chicago)	Antonio Williams WR (Washington)	Caleb Williams QB (Chicago)
2	Josh Allen QB (Buffalo)	Jaxon Smith-Njigba WR (Seattle)	Hezekiah Masses CB (Las Vegas)	Jaxon Smith-Njigba WR (Seattle)
3	Marcus Mariota QB (Washington)	Brock Purdy QB (San Francisco)	Kenyon Sadiq TE (NY Jets)	Jahmyr Gibbs RB (Detroit)
4	Kenneth Walker III RB (Kansas City)	Tetairoa McMillan WR (Carolina)	Arvell Reese LB (NY Giants)	Tetairoa McMillan WR (Carolina)
5	Drake Maye QB (New England)	Jordan Love QB (Green Bay)	David Bailey DE (NY Jets)	Drake Maye QB (New England)
6	Kenneth Walker III RB (Kansas City)	Malik Nabers WR (NY Giants)	Omar Cooper Jr. WR (NY Jets)	Christian McCaffrey RB (San Francisco)
7	Joe Burrow QB (Cincinnati)	Jaxon Smith-Njigba WR (Seattle)	Omar Cooper Jr. WR (NY Jets)	Tony Pollard RB (Tennessee)
8	Joe Burrow QB (Cincinnati)	Jordan Love QB (Green Bay)	Emmett Johnson RB (Kansas City)	Joe Burrow QB (Cincinnati)
9	Joe Burrow QB (Cincinnati)	Jordan Love QB (Green Bay)	Arvell Reese LB (NY Giants)	Kenneth Walker III RB (Kansas City)
10	Joe Burrow QB (Cincinnati)	Christian McCaffrey RB (San Francisco)	Emmett Johnson RB (Kansas City)	Christian McCaffrey RB (San Francisco)

Month	Rookies of the Month	
Month	Offensive	Defensive
Sept.	Kahlil Benson T (Kansas City)	Anthony Hill Jr. LB (Tennessee)
Oct.	Carnell Tate WR (Tennessee)	Brandon Cisse CB (Green Bay)
Nov.		
Dec./Jan.		

== Notable events ==
=== Referee collective bargaining agreement ===
The collective bargaining agreement between the NFL and NFL Referees Association (NFLRA) was set to expire on May 31, 2026. If no agreement had been reached by that date, the league planned to lockout its regular game officials and then use replacement referees for the first time since the 2012 NFL referee lockout. One issue under dispute was that the referees' union wanted an annual salary increase of 10 percent per year for the next six years, while the league had offered just 6.45 percent. The league also wanted additional performance standards such as increasing the probationary period for new officials from three to five years, and to award more playoff games based on performance instead of seniority. On May 8, 2026, the NFL and the NFLRA ratified a new 7-year CBA, which runs until the 2032 season.

=== Pro Bowl Honors ===
On August 26, the NFL announced that the league will no longer hold any future Pro Bowl games, ending the annual event after 88 years and becoming the first of the "Big Four" professional sports leagues to end their all-star event. Instead, a Pro Bowl team consisting of 88 players will be selected each season under the same format, and all players selected to the team will be invited to a ceremony after the season to be honored.

=== Effects of the FAA nationwide ground stop ===
While all teams were able to get their Week 10 games despite the November 13 FAA nationwide ground stop, the league reassigned some game officials so they would be working within driving distance of their homes. This meant mixing up the regular officiating crews and moving some officials out of their regular positions. The New England–Detroit International Series game was not affected because the teams and officials had already left for Germany. Notably, side judge Don Willard served as the head referee for two Sunday games, and was joined by three other officials in first working the Miami–Indianapolis game at 1:00 p.m. ET, then driving the approximately 110 miles (180 km) to the Pittsburgh–Cincinnati 8:20 p.m. ET Sunday Night Football game.

== Records, milestones and notable statistics ==
Week 1

- Josiah Trotter became the first rookie to record a sack and an interception returned for a touchdown in his first career game.
- T. J. Watt became the second player to record 100 sacks and 10 interceptions since sacks became an official statistic in 1982, joining Julius Peppers.
- Derrick Henry passed Marcus Allen for third-most career rushing touchdowns.
- The Chicago Bears and Carolina Panthers set the record for most combined points scored in a season opener, with 96. The previous record of 88 was held by the 2018 Tampa Bay Buccaneers and New Orleans Saints.

Week 2

- Christian McCaffrey became the third player to have at least 50 scrimmage touchdowns for multiple franchises, joining Marshall Faulk and Randy Moss.
- The Green Bay Packers became the first team in the Super Bowl era to win a game despite recording fewer than 200 total yards, committing at least 10 penalties, and forcing zero turnovers. Teams to do this were previously 0–38.

Week 3

- Matthew Stafford set the record for most interceptions returned for a touchdown thrown, with 33. He shared the previous record of 32 with Brett Favre.
- Stafford also became the first player to have 20,000 passing yards for two different franchises.
- Josh Allen became the second quarterback to have multiple rushing touchdowns in three consecutive games, joining Billy Kilmer.
- Jahmyr Gibbs became the second player with at least 300 rushing yards, 150 receiving yards, and six total touchdowns in the first three games of a season, joining Billy Sims.
- Jaxon Smith-Njigba became the second player to have at least 400 receiving yards and six total touchdowns in the first three games of a season, joining Marvin Harrison.
- The New York Jets extended their NFL-record streak of consecutive games without a defensive interception to 20. It was ended the following week.

Week 5

- Aaron Rodgers passed Ben Roethlisberger for fifth most wins by a starting quarterback, with 166.
- Jahmyr Gibbs set the record for most games with at least two touchdowns before a player's 25th birthday, with 16. The previous record of 15 was shared by Jim Brown, Todd Gurley, and Christian McCaffrey.
- Gibbs also set the record for most scrimmage touchdowns before a player's 25th birthday, with 58. The previous record of 57 was held by Barry Sanders.
- Trey McBride set the record for most receptions by a tight end in his first five seasons, with 388. The previous record of 386 was held by Jimmy Graham.
- McBride also became the first tight end with at least seven receptions in each of his team’s first five games of a season.
- Justin Herbert became the first quarterback to lose his first five starts of a season, while throwing an interception and taking at least two sacks in each game, since sacks became an official statistic in 1982.
- Calais Campbell set the record for most games played by a defensive lineman, with 283. He shared the previous record of 282 with Jim Marshall.
- Jared Goff became the first player to have at least 12 passing touchdowns and no turnovers through the first five games of a season.

Week 6

- Patrick Mahomes tied the record for fastest quarterback to win 100 starts, doing so in 131 games. He shares the record with Tom Brady.
- Travis Hunter became the third player in the Super Bowl era to record a receiving touchdown and an interception in the same game, joining Brian Dawkins and Roy Green. Hunter also became the first to record a receiving touchdown and an interception on consecutive drives.
- Puka Nacua set the record for most receptions in a player's first 50 games, currently with 350. The previous record of 346 was held by Michael Thomas.
- Kenneth Walker III became the second player to have at least 600 rushing yards, six rushing touchdowns and two receiving touchdowns through the first five games of a season, joining Jim Brown.
- Walker also became the second player in the Super Bowl era with multiple scrimmage touchdowns in four of the first five games of a season, joining Calvin Johnson.
- The NFC East became the first division to post consecutive winless weeks in which at least four teams from the division played each week.

Week 7

- Aaron Rodgers passed Peyton Manning for third-most career touchdown passes.
- Travis Kelce passed Marvin Harrison for fifth-most career receptions.
- Matthew Stafford became the first player to lead two franchises in career passing touchdowns.
- Jared Goff tied the record for most passing touchdowns without an interception in a team's first six games of a season, with 14. He shares the record with Russell Wilson.
- Trey McBride became the first tight end to have at least 400 receptions in his first five seasons.
- McBride also became the first player with at least seven receptions in each of his team's first seven games of a season.
- Jaxon Smith-Njigba became the second player in the Super Bowl era to have at least 800 receiving yards and eight receiving touchdowns through the first seven games of a season, joining Cooper Kupp.

Week 8

- Joe Burrow became the second player to have at least 450 passing yards, five passing touchdowns, and a rushing touchdown in a game, joining Norm Van Brocklin.
- The Tampa Bay Buccaneers became the sixth team to win a game with no completed passes, and the first since the 1974 Buffalo Bills.
- The Pittsburgh Steelers tied the record for longest home winning streak against a single opponent, with their 23rd straight home win over the Cleveland Browns. They share this record with the 1992–2014 Green Bay Packers over the Detroit Lions.
- The Los Angeles Chargers became the first team to start a season 0–7 after winning at least 11 games the previous season.

Week 9

- Puka Nacua set the record for most receptions in a player's first seven games of a season, with 70. The previous record of 67 was held by Adam Thielen.
- Patrick Mahomes and Travis Kelce set the record for most passing/receiving yards by a quarterback-tight end duo, with 9,365. The previous record of 9,352 was held by Philip Rivers and Antonio Gates.
- Christian McCaffrey set the Super Bowl era record for most receiving touchdowns by a running back, with 37. The previous record of 36 was held by Marshall Faulk.
- The San Francisco 49ers became the second franchise to have seven players record at least 100 touchdown passes, joining the Los Angeles Rams.

Week 10

- Joe Burrow tied the record for most consecutive games with at least four touchdown passes, with five. He shares the record with Peyton Manning.
- Burrow also became the first player to post three career games with a completion rate of at least 70%, 400 or more passing yards, four or more touchdown passes, and no interceptions.
- Christian McCaffrey became the first player in the Super Bowl era to record at least 150 receiving yards, two receiving touchdowns, 50 rushing yards, and a rushing touchdown in the same game.
- Jahmyr Gibbs set the record for most rushing touchdowns in a player's first four seasons, currently with 62; the previous record of 61 was held by Terrell Davis.
- Jaxon Smith-Njigba became the fourth player, and first in the Super Bowl era, to have at least 1,200 receiving yards and 10 receiving touchdowns through his team’s first 10 games of a season, joining Raymond Berry, Elroy Hirsch, and Don Hutson.
- Smith-Njigba also tied the Super Bowl era record for most games with 100 receiving yards in his team's first 10 games of a season, with seven. He shares the record with Randy Moss.
- Josh Allen set the record for most total touchdowns in a player's first ten seasons, currently with 325. The previous record of 322 was held by Manning.
- The Cleveland Browns became the first team to earn each of its first six wins of a season by four points or fewer.

== Head coaching and general manager changes ==
=== Head coaches ===
==== Off-season ====
Team	Departing coach	Interim coach	Incoming coach	Reason for leaving	Notes
Arizona Cardinals	Jonathan Gannon		Mike LaFleur	Fired	Gannon was fired on January 5, after three seasons with a 15–36 (.294) record (3–14 in 2025) and no playoff appearances as the Cardinals' head coach. LaFleur was hired on February 1. Previously he was the offensive coordinator of the Los Angeles Rams from 2023 to 2025. This is his first head coaching job at any level.
Atlanta Falcons	Raheem Morris		Kevin Stefanski	Fired	Morris was fired on January 4, after two seasons with a 16–18 (.471) record (8–9 in 2025) and no playoff appearances as a full time head coach. Stefanski was hired on January 17. Previously he was the head coach of the Cleveland Browns from 2020 to 2025 with a 45–56 (.446) record and two playoff appearances.
Baltimore Ravens	John Harbaugh		Jesse Minter	Fired	Harbaugh was fired on January 6, after 18 seasons with the Ravens. During his tenure, the team had a 180–113 (.614) record (8–9 in 2025), with the Super Bowl XLVII championship, six AFC North division titles in 12 overall playoff appearances, and a playoff record of 13–11 (.542). Minter was hired on January 22, after serving as the defensive coordinator for the Los Angeles Chargers in 2024 and 2025. He was the interim head coach for Michigan during their first game in 2023 when Jim Harbaugh was suspended for recruiting violations.
Buffalo Bills	Sean McDermott		Joe Brady	Fired	McDermott was fired on January 19, after nine seasons with a 98–50 (.662) record (12–5 in 2025) and eight playoff appearances as the Bills' head coach. Brady, the team's offensive coordinator from 2023 to 2025, was promoted to head coach on January 27. This is his first head coaching job at any level.
Cleveland Browns	Kevin Stefanski		Todd Monken	Fired	Stefanski was fired on January 5, after six seasons with the team. During his tenure, the Browns had a 45–56 (.446) record (5–12 in 2025), with two playoff appearances. Monken was hired on January 28. He previously served as the offensive coordinator for the Baltimore Ravens from 2023 to 2025 and was the head coach at Southern Miss from 2013 to 2015 with a 13–25 (.342) record.
Las Vegas Raiders	Pete Carroll		Klint Kubiak	Fired	Carroll was fired on January 5, with a 3–14 (.176) record after being hired in 2025, with no playoff appearances. On February 8, after winning Super Bowl LX, Kubiak confirmed that he would be the head coach for the Raiders. He previously served as the offensive coordinator for the Seattle Seahawks during the 2025 season. This is his first head coaching job at any level.
Miami Dolphins	Mike McDaniel		Jeff Hafley	Fired	McDaniel was fired on January 8, with a 35–33 (.515) record (7–10 in 2025) after being hired in 2022 and appearing in the playoffs twice in 2022 and 2023, with no playoff wins in four full seasons as coach. Hafley was hired on January 19. He previously served as the defensive coordinator for the Green Bay Packers from 2024 to 2025 and was the head coach at Boston College from 2020 to 2023 with a 22–26 (.458) record.
New York Giants	Brian Daboll	Mike Kafka	John Harbaugh	Fired	Daboll was fired as head coach on November 10, 2025, with a 20–40–1 (.336) record (2–8 in 2025) and achieved one playoff appearance with a 1–1 playoff record. Kafka, the team's assistant head coach and offensive coordinator, took over as interim coach. This was his first head coaching position at any level. He finished the season with a 2–5 (.286) record. Harbaugh was hired on January 17. Previously he was the head coach of the Baltimore Ravens from 2008 to 2025 with a 180–113 (.614) record, 12 playoff appearances, and the Super Bowl XLVII championship.
Pittsburgh Steelers	Mike Tomlin		Mike McCarthy	Resigned	Tomlin resigned on January 13. During his 19-season tenure, the Steelers had a 193–114–2 (.628) record (10–7 in 2025), winning Super Bowl XLIII and eight AFC North titles in 13 overall playoff appearances, with an 8–12 (.400) playoff record. McCarthy was hired on January 24. Previously he was the head coach of the Green Bay Packers from 2006 to 2018 and the Dallas Cowboys from 2020 to 2024 with a combined record of 174–112–2 (.608), winning Super Bowl XLV, and making multiple playoff appearances.
Tennessee Titans	Brian Callahan	Mike McCoy	Robert Saleh	Fired	Callahan was fired as head coach on October 13, 2025, with a 4–19 (.174) record (1–5 in 2025) after being hired in 2024. McCoy, the team's senior offensive assistant, took over as interim coach. This was his second NFL head coaching position, having previously been the head coach of the San Diego Chargers from 2013 to 2016, with a record of 27–37 (.422) and one playoff appearance. He finished the season with a 2–9 (.182) record. Saleh was hired on January 22. He previously served as the defensive coordinator for the San Francisco 49ers in 2025 and was the head coach of the New York Jets from 2021 to 2024, with a 20–36 (.357) record and no playoff appearances.

=== General managers ===
==== Off-season ====
Team	Departing GM	Interim replacement	Incoming GM	Reason for leaving	Notes
Atlanta Falcons	Terry Fontenot		Ian Cunningham	Fired	Fontenot was fired on January 4, after five seasons with the team as a general manager with a 36–48 (.429) record and no play-off appearances. Cunningham was hired on January 29. Previously he was the assistant general manager of the Chicago Bears from 2022 to 2025.
Miami Dolphins	Chris Grier	Champ Kelly	Jon-Eric Sullivan	Mutual agreement	Grier and the Dolphins mutually agreed to part ways on October 31, 2025, after almost ten seasons as Dolphins' general manager with a 77–80 (.490) record and three play-off appearances. Kelly, the team's senior personnel executive, was named interim general manager. Previously, he was the interim general manager of the Las Vegas Raiders in 2023. Sullivan was hired on January 9. He previously served for the Green Bay Packers from 2003 to 2025 in various executive roles and in the final four years as the vice president of player personnel.
Minnesota Vikings	Kwesi Adofo-Mensah		Nolan Teasley	Fired	Adofo-Mensah was fired on January 30, 2026, after four seasons as Vikings' general manager and two playoff appearances. Teasley was hired on June 1. He previously served in multiple roles within the Seattle Seahawks for the past 13 years, most recently having served as an assistant general manager since 2023.

==== In-season ====
Team	Departing GM	Reason for leaving	Interim replacement	Notes
Indianapolis Colts	Chris Ballard	Fired	Ed Dodds	Ballard was fired on October 19, after almost ten seasons as Colts' GM. Dodds was hired on October 19. He previously served in multiple roles within the Indianapolis Colts from 2017 to 2026 and most recently served as the assistant general manager.

== Stadiums ==
This is the first season in which the Buffalo Bills play at the new Highmark Stadium. The team had played at its former venue, also called Highmark Stadium (originally known as Ralph Wilson Stadium) since 1973.

This is the final season in which the Tennessee Titans play their home games at their current Nissan Stadium. The new stadium, also to be called Nissan Stadium, is scheduled to be completed for the 2027 season.

The Jacksonville Jaguars are playing in EverBank Stadium with a reduced capacity due to commencing renovations. The upper deck will be closed, cutting the capacity to around 43,500.

NRG Stadium, the home of the Houston Texans, returned to its former moniker of Reliant Stadium after the 2026 FIFA World Cup and before the preseason.

== Uniforms ==
=== Rivalries series ===
AFC South and NFC North teams unveiled the second set of "Rivalries" uniforms on August 25, 2026. First introduced in 2025, they are to be worn at one home divisional game per season.

- Chicago: navy jerseys with orange pants and orange helmets, nicknamed the "Return of the Monsters."
- Detroit: white uniforms with black and Honolulu blue accents, along with Honolulu blue helmets, nicknamed "Defend the Den."
- Green Bay: vintage green jerseys with alabaster and gold stripes, paired with alabaster pants and helmets, nicknamed "Making History Since 1919."
- Houston: all-white uniforms with battle red and H-Town blue accents, nicknamed "Houston/Us."
- Indianapolis: all-anvil steel uniforms with metallic blue accents and helmets, nicknamed "Anvil Strike."
- Jacksonville: alabaster jerseys with teal helmets and black pants with jaguar spots, nicknamed "Bold City."
- Minnesota: all-deep purple uniforms with ivory and metallic gold accents, nicknamed "Feel the North."
- Tennessee: navy uniforms with Titans Blue accents and helmets, nicknamed "Music City."

=== Uniform changes ===
- Atlanta unveiled new uniforms on April 2.
- Baltimore unveiled new uniforms on April 16.
- Buffalo unveiled a new alternate uniform dubbed “Nickel City” on July 27. This uniform features an all-gray pant and jersey combo inspired by the Buffalo nickel, royal blue socks, and an alternate helmet listed below. It will be worn for two games.
- The Los Angeles Rams unveiled new primary uniforms on April 16 under the marketing slogan "Threaded with Greatness". The redesigned jerseys incorporate the team's Rivalries uniform's shoulder horns while omitting the "Rams" wordmark from the front and changes the home jersey's gradient numbers to solid yellow numbers. White pants were also reintroduced to the team's uniform. The team also unveiled two new alternate uniforms on July 23 titled "Classic Sol" and "Fearsome White". The Classic Sol uniform features a yellow-on-white jersey and pants combination with three blue stripes on the sleeves. The Fearsome White uniform features an all white jersey and pants combination with a Rams-themed shoulder stripe that matches the helmet.
- Tampa Bay announced the return of their all-pewter alternate uniform after a two-year absence. This replaces the home version of their creamsicle throwback uniforms.
- Tennessee unveiled new uniforms on March 12. In addition to the uniforms, the team also redesigned its logo, eliminating the flames from the previous logo. The colors of the uniforms and logo were changed to reflect the original colors of the Houston Oilers.
- Washington unveiled new uniforms on April 15 templated after the white "Super Bowl Era" alternate uniforms introduced in the previous season, with a corresponding burgundy uniform being released. The uniforms are based on the set introduced by the franchise in 1979 and used in various forms until 2022. White and gold pants were also released. An alternate all-black uniform, nicknamed the "Hail Raiser", was also unveiled using the same template.

=== Alternate helmets ===
- Baltimore's new uniform set features a new alternate helmet dubbed the "Darkness Helmet."
- Buffalo will pair their alternate “Nickel City” uniform with an alternate helmet, nicknamed “The Charge.” This helmet features an all-blue base with the red charge from their logo as the decals.
- The New York Jets unveiled an alternate “White Out” helmet. The design of the helmet is an inverse of the typical green-and-white coloring of the team’s primary helmet with a white facemask. The team paired the helmet with their white jersey and white pants in their home opener. Although NFL rules state that teams can only have a maximum of three alternate helmets, the team will stay within this rule by swapping the decals and facemask on their white "The Classic" throwback helmet.
- Washington’s alternate "Hail Raiser" uniform includes a black helmet featuring a new "Spear W" decal and burgundy-gold-burgundy striping pattern.

=== Patches ===
- Houston will wear a patch to commemorate the 25th season of the franchise.
- New Orleans will wear a patch to commemorate the 60th season of the franchise.
- San Francisco will wear a patch commemorating its 80th anniversary (from the founding of its first league, the All-America Football Conference).
- Chicago wears a patch to honor Hall-of-Fame tight end and coach Mike Ditka, who died on October 9, 2026. The patch debuted on October 18, which would have been Dikta's 87th birthday.

== Media ==
=== National ===
Under an agreement that was first announced on August 5, 2025, and approved by government regulators on January 31, 2026, ESPN acquired NFL Network, television distribution rights to NFL RedZone and the RedZone brand. In exchange, the league received a 10 percent equity stake in ESPN. The NFL's existing deal with ESPN remained unaffected.

Netflix signed a four-year extension to its original three-year deal that was previously set to expire after the 2026 season, expanding its schedule of games.

This is the fourth year of the existing 11-year U.S. media deals with CBS Sports, Fox Sports, and NBC Sports; the fifth year of a 12-year deal with Amazon Prime Video; and the fourth year under a seven-year deal with YouTube.

==== Linear television ====
- Sunday afternoon regional games continue to be split between CBS and Fox, with the two networks carrying the AFC and NFC packages, respectively. Each network is scheduled to produce ten Sunday doubleheaders (with games at 1:00 and 4:25 p.m. ET), and eight single games (each media market airs either a 1:00 or 4:05 p.m. ET game). During most Sundays, one network will have the doubleheader and the other network will have the single game; both networks will air a doubleheader during weeks 1 and 18. On Thanksgiving, CBS and Fox will nationally air the 1:00 p.m. ET Detroit game and the 4:30 p.m. ET Dallas game, respectively, Fox will also air a primetime game on Christmas Day (using the option in its contract to air a game on the holiday for the first time).
- NBC continues to air Sunday Night Football games, the NFL Kickoff Game, and the primetime Thanksgiving game.
- ESPN continues to produce Monday Night Football games, and a Week 18 Saturday doubleheader. ABC will simulcast 10 MNF games and the Saturday doubleheader. There are no longer "split" weeks of MNF with separate games on ESPN and ABC. ESPN also produces seven national games airing on NFL Network, including five International Series games in Sunday morning (9:30 a.m. ET) windows and a Saturday doubleheader in Week 16. Due to the acquisition of NFL Media by ESPN, four games from NFL Network's package were returned to the league and contractually replaced by four games that were previously part of ESPN's current contract (the three MNF split games, and a game previously exclusive to ESPN+). Additionally, in weeks when ABC airs a MNF game beginning in Week 5, NFL Network also airs an additional alternate telecast of MNF games alongside ESPN2 (which airs altcasts all season long).The NFL resold these four games to its television partners under one-year deals:
  - CBS and Fox will air a national Saturday doubleheader during Week 15 on December 19, 2026, with Fox airing a 5:00 p.m. ET game, and CBS airing an 8:20 p.m. ET game.
  - Fox acquired the rights to the International Series game in Munich, which aired in a Sunday morning window as part of a tripleheader.
  - NBC will carry a Saturday afternoon game during Week 17 on January 2 (NFL Holiday Special), forming a doubleheader with its Peacock-exclusive primetime game.

==== Streaming ====
- Amazon Prime Video and Twitch will exclusively stream Thursday Night Football games a game on the Friday after Thanksgiving under the title Black Friday Football.
- The ESPN app’s unlimited tier will simulcast all ESPN-produced games, including any alternate telecasts, and have a live stream of NFL Network. Disney+ will also simulcast selected Monday Night Football games, marking the first time it will carry traditional broadcasts of NFL games in the U.S.
- Fox One will simulcast in market and national Fox games, Additionally, Fox announced that Tubi will simulcast the network's Thanksgiving Day game.
- Paramount+ will simulcast in market and national CBS games.
- Peacock will simulcast NBC's games. This will also be the fourth season in a six-year deal that the platform will exclusively stream one regular season game, with the game being a week 17 Saturday game this season.
- Netflix will have a Christmas Day afternoon doubleheader this season like in previous seasons. It also acquired rights to the International Series game in Melbourne during Week 1, a new Wednesday-night "Thanksgiving Eve" game, and a Saturday afternoon game during Week 18.
- NFL Sunday Ticket, the package showing out-of-market Sunday afternoon games, is available on YouTube TV or as a standalone subscription on YouTube Primetime Channels.
- The league will still own and operate NFL+, which will continue to live stream in-market and national preseason, regular season and postseason games on mobile devices only, radio broadcasts for all games, most out-of-market preseason games and a live stream of NFL Network on its base tier, and replays of games along with a live stream of NFL RedZone on its premium tier.

==== Postseason ====
During the Wild Card round, CBS and Fox will air an AFC and NFC Wild Card game, respectively. NBC will air the Sunday night game under the sixth year of its seven-year deal. ESPN/ABC will broadcast a Wild Card game on a date to-be-determined, as its previous deal to air the Monday night Wild Card game expired after the previous postseason. NBC will air a second Wild Card game this season as part of a rotation with Fox and CBS. This will also be the third postseason under a multi-year deal that Amazon Prime Video will exclusively stream a Wild Card playoff game.

This will be the fourth season that all four broadcast television partners each air one divisional playoff game per season (ESPN/ABC, Fox, CBS, and NBC).

This will be the 29th for CBS and the 33rd season that Fox will televise the AFC and NFC Championship games respectively.

Super Bowl LXI will be broadcast by ABC and ESPN in English, and ESPN Deportes and Univision in Spanish. It will mark the first time ABC will have aired the Super Bowl since 2006's Super Bowl XL, and the first time that ESPN will air a live Super Bowl in English.

==== Radio ====
- Westwood One has rights to air all games televised by the national partners.
- ESPN Radio and Sports USA Radio Network has rights to air select Sunday afternoon games on its radio networks. ESPN's rights expanded to include the Buffalo Bills after Good Karma Brands, the company that manages ESPN Radio on behalf of ESPN, also manages the Buffalo Bills Radio Network in 2026.
- This is the final season of the league's five-year deal with SiriusXM to simulcast all 32 teams' local regular season and postseason broadcasts, including a wraparound show called SiriusXM NFL Sunday Drive.

==== Personnel changes ====
- NBC's pre-game show Football Night in America saw a number of changes, including the departures of Tony Dungy after 17 seasons and Chris Simms after 9 seasons, and the arrival of former Pittsburgh Steelers head coach Mike Tomlin as a new panelist.
- The NFL Today crew added Russell Wilson and Kyle Long replacing Matt Ryan as analysts. Additionally, insider Jonathan Jones departed the show to take a new job at The Athletic.
- Following his July 23 operating while intoxicated (OWI) arrest, CBS lead analyst Tony Romo was placed on leave by the network on July 31, and he later parted ways with them on October 2. J. J. Watt, who was promoted to the network's #2 broadcast team last season, has been promoted to the lead team for this season. On October 22, Watt signed a multi-year deal with CBS Sports to continue being their lead analyst beyond this season.

=== International ===
- ESPN will air its slate of games in Latin America, sub-Saharan Africa, Oceania, and the Netherlands; and through Disney+ in select markets in Asia and Europe.
  - In Australia, ESPN's slate includes Thursday Night Football, Sunday afternoon and primetime games; while free-to-air games air on Seven, which include Thursday Night Football and weekly Sunday afternoon games.
- In the UK and Ireland:
  - This is the second year of a three-year deal that Sky Sports will broadcast select games on either their dedicated Sky Sports NFL Channel or through their Sky Sports+ channels.
  - This is the second year of a multi-year deal that the free-to-air Channel 5 will broadcast games through their main channel as well as 5Action.
- This is the fourth year of a ten-year deal that DAZN will distribute NFL Game Pass International.
- This is the fifth year of a multi-year deal with Bell Media to continue to distribute all NFL games in Canada (including RedZone) to TSN, CTV channels in English and on RDS in French. In an addition announced in August 2026, the Buffalo Bills Radio Network will be carried across Canada via Bell-owned TSN Radio.

==== Most watched regular season games ====
All times Eastern.

Rank	Date	Time	Matchup			TV Network(s)	Streaming	Viewers (millions)	Window	Notes
1	Oct 4	4:25 p.m.	Kansas City Chiefs	30–27	Las Vegas Raiders	CBS	Paramount+	28.4	Late DH	Chiefs–Raiders rivalry
2	Nov 1	4:25 p.m.	Kansas City Chiefs	24–28	Denver Broncos	CBS	Paramount+	28.2	Late DH	Broncos-Chiefs rivalry
3	Sep 20	4:25 p.m.	Washington Commanders	20–37	Dallas Cowboys	Fox	Fox One	27.2	Late DH	Commanders-Cowboys rivalry
4	Nov 15	4:25 p.m.	San Francisco 49ers	46–40	Dallas Cowboys	Fox	Fox One	27.1	Late DH	49ers-Cowboys rivalry
5	Oct 11	4:25 p.m.	San Francisco 49ers	32–29	Seattle Seahawks	Fox	Fox One	26.7	Late DH	49ers-Seahawks rivalry
6	Oct 18	4:25 p.m.	Buffalo Bills	33–30	Las Vegas Raiders	CBS	Paramount+	26.4	Late DH	
7	Oct 25	8:20 p.m.	Kansas City Chiefs	3–20	Seattle Seahawks	NBC	Peacock	26.3	SNF	
8	Sep 13	8:20 p.m.	Dallas Cowboys	20–28	New York Giants	NBC	Peacock	25.7	SNF	Cowboys-Giants rivalry
9	Nov 8	4:25 p.m.	Green Bay Packers	45–27	New England Patriots	Fox	Fox One	25.7	Late DH	
10	Sep 9	8:20 p.m.	New England Patriots	10–13	Seattle Seahawks	NBC	Peacock	25.1	Kickoff Game	Super Bowl LX rematch

- Television networks include the corresponding Spanish network broadcasts through Telemundo, Universo, ESPN Deportes, Fox Deportes, and SAP.
- For Doubleheader regional windows (Early DH and Late DH), the viewership total includes all regionally-televised games on the indicated network and specific timeslot.
- For Single game regional windows, the viewership total includes all regionally-televised games on the indicated network – both the "early" and "late" timeslots.
- (~xx%): Indicates the approximate percentage of viewers nationwide that received the featured game regionally.
