= Chris Grier =

American football executive (born 1970)

Detroit Lions
- Title: Personnel Advisor

Personal information
- Born: March 24, 1970 (age 56); Holliston, Massachusetts, U.S.

Career information
- College: University of Massachusetts Amherst

Career history
- New England Patriots (1994) Intern; New England Patriots (1995–1999) Scout; Miami Dolphins (2000–2002) Scout; Miami Dolphins (2003–2007) Assistant director of college scouting; Miami Dolphins (2007–2015) Director of college scouting; Miami Dolphins (2016–2025) General manager; Detroit Lions (2026–present) Personnel advisor
- Executive profile at Pro Football Reference

Christopher Grier (born March 24, 1970) is an American professional football executive for the Detroit Lions who previously served as the general manager for the Miami Dolphins of the National Football League from 2016 to 2025. Having been with the organization since 2000, Grier held various scouting roles with increasing responsibility with the Dolphins. He also has past experience in the personnel department of the New England Patriots, having served there from 1994 to 1999. On October 31, 2025, it was announced that Chris Grier and the Miami Dolphins had parted ways.

The Detroit Lions hired Grier as a football executive on June 3, 2026.

== Early life ==
Grier's father Bobby was the associate director of pro personnel for the Houston Texans of the National Football League (NFL) from 2000 to 2016. Prior to that, Bobby Grier spent several years with the New England Patriots, where he served in various roles, including as the running back coach, director of pro scouting, and vice-president of player personnel. Grier worked under his father with the Patriots until 1999, when the organization fired head coach Pete Carroll. His brother Mike is the current general manager of the San Jose Sharks in the National Hockey League, and a former professional ice hockey player who played for the Edmonton Oilers, Washington Capitals, San Jose Sharks, and Buffalo Sabres.

Grier attended the University of Massachusetts Amherst, where he majored in journalism; while in college, he played football for two years and then spent his final two years as an undergraduate assistant.

== Executive career ==
=== New England Patriots ===
Grier served as an intern for the New England Patriots in 1994 before being promoted to a regional scout in 1995. Grier's Patriots made the Super Bowl once in his tenure; in Super Bowl XXXI where the team lost to the Green Bay Packers 21–35. Grier has worked alongside head coaches Bill Parcells and Pete Carroll during his tenure in New England.

=== Miami Dolphins ===
From 2000 to 2002, Grier served as an area scout for the Miami Dolphins. In 2003, Grier was promoted to national scout and assistant director of college scouting. He held this position until 2007 when he was promoted to director of college scouting. In his first 15 years with the Dolphins (before becoming their general manager in 2016), Grier worked alongside head coaches Dave Wannstedt, Nick Saban, Cam Cameron, Tony Sparano, and Joe Philbin.

On January 4, 2016, Grier was promoted to general manager of the Dolphins. Five days later, Chicago Bears' offensive coordinator Adam Gase was hired as the new head coach for Miami. In his first move as general manager, Grier traded the Dolphins' 2016 first round draft pick (eighth overall) to the Philadelphia Eagles for linebacker Kiko Alonso, cornerback Byron Maxwell and the Eagles' first round draft pick (13th overall).

On December 31, 2018, Grier dismissed third-year head coach Gase and demoted fourth-year vice president of football operations Mike Tannenbaum as part of many organizational changes the team made following the 2018 season. On February 4, 2019, a day after Super Bowl LIII, Grier hired long-time New England Patriots' assistant Brian Flores as the team's new head coach.

On April 23, 2020, Grier selected Alabama Crimson Tide quarterback Tua Tagovailoa with the fifth overall pick in the 2020 NFL draft, making Tagovailoa the highest-drafted quarterback the team has selected since Bob Griese in 1967.

On April 29, 2021, Grier drafted Tagovailoa's former teammate from Alabama, wide receiver Jaylen Waddle with the sixth overall pick and Miami linebacker Jaelan Phillips with the eighteenth overall pick in the 2021 NFL draft. Grier's selections would turn out to be a success, as Waddle would break Anquan Boldin's record of receptions caught by a rookie, and Phillips would become the first rookie since Julius Peppers (2002) to record at least 6 sacks in a three-game span, though both players would be traded away in the 2025 and 2026 season.

On January 10, 2022, Dolphins' owner Stephen M. Ross fired third-year head coach Flores. Mike McDaniel was chosen to replace him and announced as the head coach on February 6, 2022. Ross decided to retain Grier for the 2022 season, effectively becoming the franchise's longest-serving general manager since Eddie Jones (1990–2004) and the fourth-longest-serving general manager in franchise history (behind Jones, Mike Robbie (1978–1989), and Don Shula (1970–1977)).

On September 14, 2025, frustrated Dolphins fans funded a GoFundMe campaign and flew a "Fire Grier. Fire McDaniel" banner over Hard Rock Stadium. The frustrations mostly centered on Grier's inability to construct a consistently strong roster or win a playoff game as General Manager.

On October 31, 2025, The Miami Dolphins mutually agreed to part ways with Grier. His departure came less than a day after the Dolphins fell to 2–7 with a 28–6 loss to the Baltimore Ravens on Thursday Night Football.

During Grier's tenure, the Dolphins had five winning seasons and made the playoffs three times: in 2016 (Grier's first year as general manager), where they lost 30–12 in the Wild Card Playoff against the Pittsburgh Steelers, in 2022, where they again lost the Wild Card Playoff, this time against division rival Buffalo Bills, and in 2023 where they lost at Arrowhead 26–7 to the eventual back-to-back Super Bowl Champion Kansas City Chiefs.

=== Detroit Lions ===
On June 3, 2026, Grier was hired by the Detroit Lions as a personnel executive.
