= 2025 Jacksonville Jaguars season =

31st season in franchise history

- Owner: Shahid Khan
- General manager: James Gladstone
- Head coach: Liam Coen
- Offensive coordinator: Grant Udinski
- Defensive coordinator: Anthony Campanile
- Home stadium: EverBank Stadium

Results
- Record: 13–4
- Division place: 1st AFC South
- Playoffs: Lost Wild Card Playoffs (vs. Bills) 24–27
- All-Pros: LS Ross Matiscik (1st team); OLB Devin Lloyd (2nd team)
- Pro Bowlers: LS Ross Matiscik; OLB Devin Lloyd

Uniform
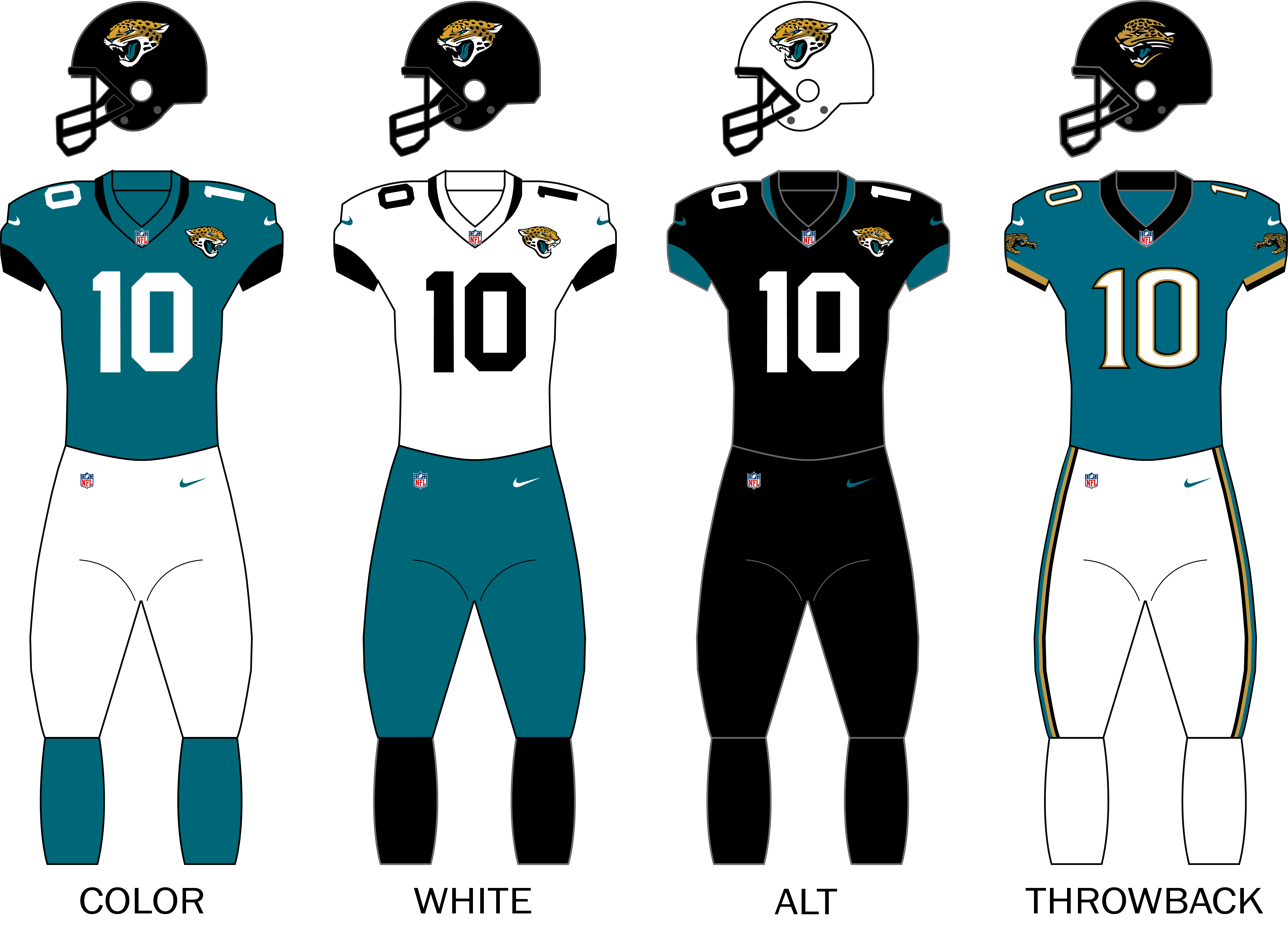

The 2025 season was the Jacksonville Jaguars' 31st in the National Football League (NFL), and their first under general manager James Gladstone and head coach Liam Coen. The Jaguars improved on their 4–13 record from the previous season following a Week 9 victory against the Las Vegas Raiders in overtime. With a Week 15 victory over the New York Jets, the Jaguars clinched a 10-win season for the first time since 2017. In Week 16, they clinched a return to the playoffs after a two-year absence with a win against the Denver Broncos on Sunday, coupled with an Indianapolis Colts loss to the San Francisco 49ers the following day. The Jaguars finished the season on an eight-game win streak to win their fifth division title and their third AFC South title with a Week 18 win over the Tennessee Titans. With the victory, the Jaguars won 13 games, their most since 1999. However, the Jaguars season came to an end with a 27–24 loss in the Wild Card round against the Buffalo Bills.

This season began with the team's fourth head coach in six seasons. During the season, Cam Little broke the NFL record for the longest field goal made in an NFL game at 68 yards, surpassing Justin Tucker's previous record of 66 yards. He also kicked a 67 yard field goal against the Titans in Week 18, setting an NFL record for the longest field goal made in an outdoor stadium.

== Offseason ==
=== Players additions ===
Position	Player	Former team	Date
WR	Dyami Brown	Washington Commanders	March 12
G	Chuma Edoga	Dallas Cowboys	March 12
C	Robert Hainsey	Tampa Bay Buccaneers	March 12
CB	Jourdan Lewis	Dallas Cowboys	March 12
TE	Hunter Long	Los Angeles Rams	March 12
G	Patrick Mekari	Baltimore Ravens	March 12
QB	Nick Mullens	Minnesota Vikings	March 12
TE	Johnny Mundt	Minnesota Vikings	March 12
S	Eric Murray	Houston Texans	March 12
DE	Emmanuel Ogbah	Miami Dolphins	April 27
LB	Dennis Gardeck	Arizona Cardinals	May 4
DT	Austin Johnson	Buffalo Bills	August 4
CB	Greg Newsome II	Cleveland Browns	October 9
WR	Jakobi Meyers	Las Vegas Raiders	November 4

=== Players lost ===
Position	Player	New team	Date
C	Mitch Morse	Retirement	March 6
WR	Josh Reynolds	New York Jets	March 6
TE	Evan Engram	Denver Broncos	March 6
WR	Devin Duvernay	Chicago Bears	March 12
TE	Luke Farrell	San Francisco 49ers	March 13
S	Andre Cisco	New York Jets	March 14
WR	Tim Jones	Minnesota Vikings	March 19
CB	Tyson Campbell	Cleveland Browns	October 9

=== Draft ===
2025 Jacksonville Jaguars draft selections
Round	Selection	Player	Position	College	Notes
1	2	Travis Hunter	WR/CB	Colorado	From Browns (Note: The Jaguars traded a first-round selection (5th overall), a second-round selection (36th overall), a fourth-round selection (126th overall) and a 2026 first-round selection to the Cleveland Browns in exchange for a first-round selection (2nd overall), a fourth-round selection (104th overall) and a sixth-round selection (200th overall).)
1	5	Traded to the Cleveland Browns			
2	36	Traded to the Cleveland Browns			
3	70	Traded to the Detroit Lions (Note: The Jaguars traded a third-round selection (70th overall), a sixth-round selection (182nd overall), and a 2026 sixth-round selection to the Detroit Lions in exchange for a third-round selection (102nd overall) and two 2026 third-round selections.)			
3	88	Caleb Ransaw	CB	Tulane	From Vikings (Note: The Jaguars traded a 2024 first-round selection (17th overall) to the Minnesota Vikings in exchange for third- and fourth-round selections (88th and 126th overall), and 2024 first- and fifth-round selections (23rd and 167th overall).)
3	89	Wyatt Milum	OG	West Virginia	From Texans (Note: The Jaguars traded a third-round selection (102nd overall) and a fifth-round selection (142nd overall) to the Houston Texans in exchange for a third-round selection (89th overall), and a seventh-round selection (236th overall).)
3	102	Traded to the Houston Texans			From Detroit
4	104	Bhayshul Tuten	RB	Virginia Tech	From Browns
4	107	Jack Kiser	LB	Notre Dame	
4	126	Traded to the Cleveland Browns			From Vikings
5	142	Traded to the Houston Texans			
6	182	Traded to the Detroit Lions			
6	194	Jalen McLeod	LB	Auburn	From Seahawks (Note: The Jaguars traded LB Trevis Gipson to the Seattle Seahawks in exchange for a sixth-round selection (194th overall).)
6	200	Rayuan Lane III	S	Navy	From Browns
7	221	Jonah Monheim	C	USC	
7	236	LeQuint Allen	RB	Syracuse	From Texans

=== Undrafted free agents ===
2025 Jacksonville Jaguars undrafted free agents
Name	Position	College	Ref.
Chandler Brayboy	WR	Elon	
Cam Camper	WR	Boise State	
James Carpenter	DL	Indiana	
Branson Combs	LB	Wake Forest	
John Copenhaver	TE	North Carolina	
Ethan Downs	DL	Oklahoma	
B. J. Green	DL	Colorado	
Seth Henigan	QB	Memphis	
Patrick Herbert	TE	Oregon	
Ja'Quinden Jackson	RB	Arkansas	
J. J. Jones	WR	North Carolina	
Eli Mostaert	DL	North Dakota State	
Jabbar Muhammad	DB	Oregon	
Eli Pancol	WR	Duke	
Keivie Rose	DL	Arkansas	
Cam'Ron Silmon-Craig	S	Colorado	
Doneiko Slaughter	DB	Arkansas	
Danny Striggow	DL	Minnesota	
Aydan White	DB	North Carolina State	
Sal Wormley	OL	Penn State	

Draft trades

== Staff ==
2025 Jacksonville Jaguars staff
Front office: Owner – Shahid Khan; President – Mark Lamping; Executive vice president of football operations – Tony Boselli; General manager – James Gladstone; Senior advisor to the general manager – Brian Xanders; Senior advisor to the general manager – JW Jordan; Director of college scouting – Brian Hill; Assistant director of college scouting – John Stevenson; Senior personnel executives – Regis Eller, Josh Scobey; Director of pro scouting – DeJuan Polk; Senior director of football strategy and game management – Jon Dykema; Senior vice president of football analytics – Jake Temme; Director of player finance – Trip MacCracken; Chief football strategy officer – Tony Khan; Head coaches: Head coach – Liam Coen; Offensive coaches: Offensive coordinator – Grant Udinski; Pass game coordinator – Shane Waldron; Quarterbacks – Spencer Whipple; Running backs – Chad Morton; Wide receivers – Edgar Bennett; Assistant wide receivers – Tyler Tettleton; Tight ends – Richard Angulo; Offensive line – Shaun Sarrett; Assistant offensive line / run game specialist – Keli'i Kekuewa; Pass game specialist – John Van Dam; Offensive assistant – Trevor Mendelson; Offensive assistant – Fred Walker	Defensive coaches: Defensive coordinator – Anthony Campanile; Defensive line – Matt Edwards; Assistant defensive line – Derrick LeBlanc; Linebackers – Tem Lukabu; Assistant linebackers – Kevin Wilkins; Secondary – Ron Milus; Defensive backs – Anthony Perkins; Assistant defensive backs coach – Drew Lascari; Senior defensive assistant – Bill Sheridan; Defensive assistant – Mario Jeberaeel; Special teams coaches: Special teams coordinator – Heath Farwell; Special teams assistant – Luke Thompson; Strength and conditioning: Head strength and conditioning coach – Eric Ciano; Assistant strength and conditioning coach – Paul Jackson; Assistant strength and conditioning coach – Lanier Coleman

== Final roster ==
2025 Jacksonville Jaguars roster
Quarterbacks (QB): 16 Trevor Lawrence; 14 Nick Mullens; Running backs (RB): 36 LeQuint Allen; 20 DeeJay Dallas; 1 Travis Etienne; 33 Bhayshul Tuten; Wide receivers (WR): 5 Dyami Brown; 3 Jakobi Meyers; 17 Tim Patrick; 7 Brian Thomas Jr.; 11 Parker Washington; Tight ends (TE): 84 Hunter Long; 80 Quintin Morris; 86 Johnny Mundt; 85 Brenton Strange	Offensive linemen (OL): 76 Ezra Cleveland G; 55 Chuma Edoga G; 73 Robert Hainsey C; 77 Anton Harrison T; 72 Walker Little T; 65 Patrick Mekari G; 64 Wyatt Milum G; 60 Jonah Monheim C; 70 Cole Van Lanen T/G; Defensive linemen (DL): 91 Arik Armstead DT; 93 Matt Dickerson DT; 95 B. J. Green DE; 52 DaVon Hamilton DT; 41 Josh Hines-Allen DE; 99 Austin Johnson DT; 90 Emmanuel Ogbah DE; 94 Maason Smith DT; 98 Dawuane Smoot DE; 92 Danny Striggow DE; 44 Travon Walker DE	Linebackers (LB): 56 Yasir Abdullah OLB; 50 Branson Combs MLB; 47 Dennis Gardeck OLB; 0 Devin Lloyd OLB; 51 Ventrell Miller OLB/MLB; 23 Foyesade Oluokun MLB; Defensive backs (DB): 21 Christian Braswell CB; 30 Montaric Brown CB; 26 Antonio Johnson SS/FS; 22 Jarrian Jones CB; 25 Rayuan Lane III SS; 29 Eric Murray SS; 6 Greg Newsome II CB; 32 Keith Taylor CB; 42 Andrew Wingard FS; Special teams (ST): 9 Logan Cooke P; 39 Cam Little K; 46 Ross Matiscik LS	Practice squad: 87 Jordan Akins TE; 10 Carter Bradley QB; 15 Chandler Brayboy WR; 79 Jerome Carvin G; 88 Patrick Herbert TE; 38 Ja'Quinden Jackson RB; 13 Tim Jones WR; 66 Ricky Lee T; 31 Keni-H Lovely CB; 37 Jabbar Muhammad CB; 97 Keivie Rose DT; 24 Cam'Ron Silmon-Craig SS; 34 Trevian Thomas FS; 4 Juan Thornhill FS; 81 Austin Trammell WR; 61 Sal Wormley G; 78 Kilian Zierer T (IPP); Reserve: 18 Joshua Cephus WR (IR); 75 Cooper Hodges G (PUP); 12 Travis Hunter CB/WR (IR); 54 Jack Kiser OLB (IR); 2 Jourdan Lewis CB (IR); 53 Jalen McLeod OLB (IR/DFR); 27 Caleb Ransaw SS (IR); Rookies in italics 53 active, 7 reserve, 16 practice squad (1 exempt)

== Preseason ==
Week	Date	Opponent	Result	Record	Venue	Recap
1	August 9	Pittsburgh Steelers	L 25–31	0–1	EverBank Stadium	Recap
2	August 17	at New Orleans Saints	T 17–17	0–1–1	Caesars Superdome	Recap
3	August 23	at Miami Dolphins	L 6–14	0–2–1	Hard Rock Stadium	Recap

== Regular season ==
=== Schedule ===
Week	Date	Opponent	Result	Record	Venue	Recap
1	September 7	Carolina Panthers	**W** 26–10	1–0	EverBank Stadium	Recap
2	September 14	at Cincinnati Bengals	**L** 27–31	1–1	Paycor Stadium	Recap
3	September 21	**Houston Texans**	**W** 17–10	2–1	EverBank Stadium	Recap
4	September 28	at San Francisco 49ers	**W** 26–21	3–1	Levi's Stadium	Recap
5	October 6	Kansas City Chiefs	**W** 31–28	4–1	EverBank Stadium	Recap
6	October 12	Seattle Seahawks	**L** 12–20	4–2	EverBank Stadium	Recap
7	October 19	Los Angeles Rams	**L** 7–35	4–3	(United Kingdom) Wembley Stadium (London)	Recap
8	Bye					
9	November 2	at Las Vegas Raiders	**W** 30–29 (OT)	5–3	Allegiant Stadium	Recap
10	November 9	at **Houston Texans**	**L** 29–36	5–4	NRG Stadium	Recap
11	November 16	Los Angeles Chargers	**W** 35–6	6–4	EverBank Stadium	Recap
12	November 23	at Arizona Cardinals	**W** 27–24 (OT)	7–4	State Farm Stadium	Recap
13	November 30	at **Tennessee Titans**	**W** 25–3	8–4	Nissan Stadium	Recap
14	December 7	**Indianapolis Colts**	**W** 36–19	9–4	EverBank Stadium	Recap
15	December 14	New York Jets	**W** 48–20	10–4	EverBank Stadium	Recap
16	December 21	at Denver Broncos	**W** 34–20	11–4	Empower Field at Mile High	Recap
17	December 28	at **Indianapolis Colts**	**W** 23–17	12–4	Lucas Oil Stadium	Recap
18	January 4	**Tennessee Titans**	**W** 41–7	13–4	EverBank Stadium	Recap

Note: Intra-division opponents are in bold text.

=== Game summaries ===
==== Week 1: vs. Carolina Panthers ====
Week 1: Carolina Panthers at Jacksonville Jaguars – Game summary

Quarter	1	2	3	4	Total
Panthers	3	0	0	7	**10**
**Jaguars**	3	17	0	6	**26**

at EverBank Stadium, Jacksonville, Florida

- Date: September 7
- Game time: 1:00 p.m. EDT
- Game weather: Mostly cloudy, 85 °F (29 °C)
- Game attendance: 59,957
- Referee: Alex Moore
- TV announcers (Fox): Chris Myers, Mark Schlereth and Jen Hale
- Recap, Game Book

Game information

**First quarter**

- JAX – Cam Little 35-yard field goal, 8:15. Jaguars 3–0. **Drive: 13 plays, 55 yards, 6:45.**
- CAR – Ryan Fitzgerald 48-yard field goal, 0:36. Tied 3–3. **Drive: 13 plays, 41 yards, 7:39.**

**Second quarter**

- JAX – Hunter Long 6-yard pass from Trevor Lawrence (Cam Little kick), 8:32. Jaguars 10–3. **Drive: 8 plays, 35 yards, 4:12.**
- JAX – Brian Thomas Jr. 9-yard run (Cam Little kick), 1:49. Jaguars 17–3. **Drive: 4 plays, 91 yards, 1:50.**
- JAX – Cam Little 47-yard field goal, 0:01. Jaguars 20–3. **Drive: 6 plays, 39 yards, 0:47.**

**Third quarter**

- No scoring plays.

**Fourth quarter**

- JAX – Cam Little 36-yard field goal, 7:09. Jaguars 23–3. **Drive: 15 plays, 49 yards, 8:07.**
- CAR – Chuba Hubbard 27-yard pass from Bryce Young (Ryan Fitzgerald kick), 4:47. Jaguars 23–10. **Drive: 10 plays, 80 yards, 2:22.**
- JAX – Cam Little 28-yard field goal, 1:57. Jaguars 26–10. **Drive: 7 plays, 38 yards, 2:50.**

**Top passers**

- CAR – Bryce Young – 18/35, 154 yards, TD, 2 INT
- JAX – Trevor Lawrence – 19/31, 178 yards, TD, INT

**Top rushers**

- CAR – Chuba Hubbard – 16 rushes, 57 yards
- JAX – Travis Etienne – 16 rushes, 143 yards

**Top receivers**

- CAR – Tetairoa McMillan – 5 receptions, 68 yards
- JAX – Brenton Strange – 4 receptions, 59 yards

The game featured a 66-minute weather delay due to lightning in the area.

==== Week 2: at Cincinnati Bengals ====
Week 2: Jacksonville Jaguars at Cincinnati Bengals – Game summary

Quarter	1	2	3	4	Total
Jaguars	7	10	7	3	**27**
**Bengals**	7	3	14	7	**31**

at Paycor Stadium, Cincinnati, Ohio

- Date: September 14
- Game time: 1:00 p.m. EDT
- Game weather: Partly sunny, 84 °F (29 °C)
- Game attendance: 65,871
- Referee: Alan Eck
- TV announcers (CBS): Chris Lewis, Logan Ryan and Tiffany Blackmon
- Recap, Game Book

Game information

**First quarter**

- JAX – Dyami Brown 9-yard pass from Trevor Lawrence (Cam Little kick), 10:51. Jaguars 7–0. **Drive: 9 plays, 69 yards, 4:09.**
- CIN – Ja'Marr Chase 4-yard pass from Joe Burrow (Evan McPherson kick), 0:07. Tied 7–7. **Drive: 11 plays, 80 yards, 4:45.**

**Second quarter**

- JAX – Bhayshul Tuten 8-yard pass from Trevor Lawrence (Cam Little kick), 10:54. Jaguars 14–7. **Drive: 8 plays, 75 yards, 4:13.**
- CIN – Evan McPherson 31-yard field goal, 3:28. Jaguars 14–10. **Drive: 7 plays, 17 yards, 3:36.**
- JAX – Cam Little 42-yard field goal, 1:35. Jaguars 17–10. **Drive: 7 plays, 41 yards, 1:53.**

**Third quarter**

- CIN – Mitchell Tinsley 13-yard pass from Jake Browning (Evan McPherson kick), 11:05. Tied 17–17. **Drive: 7 plays, 76 yards, 3:55.**
- JAX – Travis Etienne 11-yard pass from Trevor Lawrence (Cam Little kick), 4:08. Jaguars 24–17. **Drive: 5 plays, 30 yards, 3:02.**
- CIN – Tee Higgins 42-yard pass from Jake Browning (Evan McPherson kick), 2:39. Tied 24–24. **Drive: 3 plays, 47 yards, 1:29.**

**Fourth quarter**

- JAX – Cam Little 25-yard field goal, 11:43. Jaguars 27–24. **Drive: 13 plays, 68 yards, 5:56.**
- CIN – Jake Browning 1-yard run (Evan McPherson kick), 0:18. Bengals 31–27. **Drive: 15 plays, 92 yards, 3:24.**

**Top passers**

- JAX – Trevor Lawrence – 24/42, 271 yards, 3 TD, 2 INT
- CIN – Jake Browning – 21/32, 241 yards, 2 TD, 3 INT

**Top rushers**

- JAX – Travis Etienne – 14 rushes, 71 yards
- CIN – Chase Brown – 16 rushes, 47 yards

**Top receivers**

- JAX – Parker Washington – 5 receptions, 76 yards
- CIN – Ja'Marr Chase – 14 receptions, 165 yards, TD

Despite leading for most of the game and Bengals quarterback Joe Burrow exiting with a left toe injury, the Jaguars allowed backup quarterback Jake Browning to direct a 15-play, 92-yard touchdown drive, giving the Bengals a late 31–27 win.

==== Week 3: vs. Houston Texans ====
Week 3: Houston Texans at Jacksonville Jaguars – Game summary

Quarter	1	2	3	4	Total
Texans	0	3	0	7	**10**
**Jaguars**	7	0	3	7	**17**

at EverBank Stadium, Jacksonville, Florida

- Date: September 21
- Game time: 1:00 p.m. EDT
- Game weather: Mostly sunny, 85 °F (29 °C)
- Game attendance: 58,161
- Referee: Alex Kemp
- TV announcers (CBS): Spero Dedes, Adam Archuleta and Aditi Kinkhabwala
- Recap, Game Book

Game information

**First quarter**

- JAX – Bhayshul Tuten 1-yard run (Cam Little kick), 2:06. Jaguars 7–0. **Drive: 9 plays, 58 yards, 4:34.**

**Second quarter**

- HOU – Ka'imi Fairbairn 27-yard field goal, 6:54. Jaguars 7–3. **Drive: 13 plays, 71 yards, 6:57.**

**Third quarter**

- JAX – Cam Little 39-yard field goal, 6:23. Jaguars 10–3. **Drive: 13 plays, 59 yards, 8:37.**

**Fourth quarter**

- HOU – Nico Collins 50-yard pass from C. J. Stroud (Ka'imi Fairbairn kick), 9:17. Tied 10–10. **Drive: 1 play, 50 yards, 0:08.**
- JAX – Travis Etienne 10-yard run (Cam Little kick), 1:48. Jaguars 17–10. **Drive: 7 plays, 83 yards, 1:59.**

**Top passers**

- HOU – C. J. Stroud – 25/38, 204 yards, TD, 2 INT
- JAX – Trevor Lawrence – 20/40, 222 yards, INT

**Top rushers**

- HOU – Nick Chubb – 9 rushes, 38 yards
- JAX – Travis Etienne – 16 rushes, 56 yards, TD

**Top receivers**

- HOU – Nico Collins – 8 receptions, 104 yards, TD
- JAX – Brenton Strange – 6 receptions, 61 yards

==== Week 4: at San Francisco 49ers ====
Week 4: Jacksonville Jaguars at San Francisco 49ers – Game summary

Quarter	1	2	3	4	Total
**Jaguars**	0	17	9	0	**26**
49ers	3	3	8	7	**21**

at Levi's Stadium, Santa Clara, California

- Date: September 28
- Game time: 4:05 p.m. EDT/1:05 p.m. PDT
- Game weather: Cloudy, 72 °F (22 °C)
- Game attendance: 70,495
- Referee: Clete Blakeman
- TV announcers (Fox): Adam Amin, Mark Sanchez and Kristina Pink
- Recap, Game Book

Game information

**First quarter**

- SF – Eddy Piñeiro 26-yard field goal, 8:33. 49ers 3–0. **Drive: 13 plays, 57 yards, 6:27.**

**Second quarter**

- JAX – Travis Etienne 48-yard run (Cam Little kick), 14:41. Jaguars 7–3. **Drive: 1 play, 48 yards, 0:09.**
- JAX – Hunter Long 4-yard pass from Trevor Lawrence (Cam Little kick), 5:01. Jaguars 14–3. **Drive: 13 plays, 89 yards, 8:01.**
- SF – Eddy Piñeiro 23-yard field goal, 0:40. Jaguars 14–6. **Drive: 12 plays, 54 yards, 1:48.**
- JAX – Cam Little 26-yard field goal, 0:00. Jaguars 17–6. **Drive: 6 plays, 39 yards, 0:40.**

**Third quarter**

- SF – Christian McCaffrey 8-yard pass from Brock Purdy (Jauan Jennings-Brock Purdy pass), 8:32. Jaguars 17–14. **Drive: 8 plays, 73 yards, 4:04.**
- JAX – Cam Little 44-yard field goal, 4:07. Jaguars 20–14. **Drive: 4 plays, 3 yards, 1:55.**
- JAX – Parker Washington 87-yard punt return (pass failed), 2:22. Jaguars 26–14.

**Fourth quarter**

- SF – Jake Tonges 21-yard pass from Brock Purdy (Eddy Piñeiro kick), 7:41. Jaguars 26–21. **Drive: 8 plays, 92 yards, 4:16.**

**Top passers**

- JAX – Trevor Lawrence – 21/31, 174 yards, TD
- SF – Brock Purdy – 22/38, 309 yards, 2 TD, 2 INT

**Top rushers**

- JAX – Travis Etienne – 19 rushes, 124 yards, TD
- SF – Christian McCaffrey – 17 rushes, 49 yards

**Top receivers**

- JAX – Brian Thomas Jr. – 5 receptions, 49 yards
- SF – Christian McCaffrey – 6 receptions, 92 yards, TD

Wide receiver Parker Washington returned a punt 87 yards for a touchdown as the Jaguars improved to 3–1, recorded their first win against the 49ers since the 2005 season, and their first-ever win in San Francisco. Following the game, Jaguars head coach Liam Coen and 49ers defensive coordinator Robert Saleh had to be separated during a heated postgame exchange, after Saleh made a remark earlier in the week about the Jaguars 'legally stealing signals.'

==== Week 5: vs. Kansas City Chiefs ====
Week 5: Kansas City Chiefs at Jacksonville Jaguars – Game summary

Quarter	1	2	3	4	Total
Chiefs	7	7	0	14	**28**
**Jaguars**	0	7	14	10	**31**

at EverBank Stadium, Jacksonville, Florida

- Date: October 6
- Game time: 8:15 p.m. EDT
- Game weather: Mostly clear, 80 °F (27 °C)
- Game attendance: 69,329
- Referee: Brad Rogers
- TV announcers (ESPN/ABC): Joe Buck, Troy Aikman, Lisa Salters and Laura Rutledge
- Recap, Game Book

Game information

**First quarter**

- KC – Travis Kelce 2-yard pass from Patrick Mahomes (Harrison Butker kick), 4:02. Chiefs 7–0. **Drive: 9 plays, 72 yards, 4:27.**

**Second quarter**

- KC – Patrick Mahomes 9-yard run (Harrison Butker kick), 10:44. Chiefs 14–0. **Drive: 5 plays, 97 yards, 2:52.**
- JAX – Parker Washington 3-yard pass from Trevor Lawrence (Cam Little kick), 2:38. Chiefs 14–7. **Drive: 13 plays, 70 yards, 8:06.**

**Third quarter**

- JAX – Trevor Lawrence 10-yard run (Cam Little kick), 8:40. Tied 14–14. **Drive: 7 plays, 87 yards, 4:35.**
- JAX – Devin Lloyd 99-yard interception return (Cam Little kick), 2:19. Jaguars 21–14.

**Fourth quarter**

- KC – Kareem Hunt 5-yard run (Harrison Butker kick), 12:20. Tied 21–21. **Drive: 2 plays, 19 yards, 0:43.**
- JAX – Cam Little 52-yard field goal, 8:08. Jaguars 24–21. **Drive: 8 plays, 25 yards, 4:12.**
- KC – Kareem Hunt 2-yard run (Harrison Butker kick), 1:45. Chiefs 28–24. **Drive: 12 plays, 86 yards, 6:23.**
- JAX – Trevor Lawrence 1-yard run (Cam Little kick), 0:23. Jaguars 31–28. **Drive: 7 plays, 60 yards, 1:22.**

**Top passers**

- KC – Patrick Mahomes – 29/41, 318 yards, TD, INT
- JAX – Trevor Lawrence – 18/25, 221 yards, TD, INT

**Top rushers**

- KC – Patrick Mahomes – 6 rushes, 60 yards, TD
- JAX – Trevor Lawrence – 10 rushes, 54 yards, 2 TD

**Top receivers**

- KC – Tyquan Thornton – 3 receptions, 90 yards
- JAX – Brian Thomas Jr. – 4 receptions, 80 yards

Playing against the Chiefs on Monday Night Football, the Jaguars snapped their eight-game losing streak against the Chiefs, defeating them for the first time since 2009. Two notable plays occurred during the game. With 2:38 left in the third quarter, Devin Lloyd returned an interception 99 yards for a touchdown, setting a record for the longest defensive touchdown in Jaguars history. The last one came in the final minute of the game, where after quarterback Trevor Lawrence took the snap, he got stepped on by a guard, causing him to fall down, but he managed to get up before being touched and ran into the end zone for the game-winning score, in a play that was known as the "Stumble-Six".

==== Week 6: vs. Seattle Seahawks ====
Week 6: Seattle Seahawks at Jacksonville Jaguars – Game summary

Quarter	1	2	3	4	Total
**Seahawks**	0	13	7	0	**20**
Jaguars	6	0	0	6	**12**

at EverBank Stadium, Jacksonville, Florida

- Date: October 12
- Game time: 1:00 p.m. EDT
- Game weather: Sunny, 76 °F (24 °C)
- Game attendance: 61,056
- Referee: Clay Martin
- TV announcers (Fox): Chris Myers, Mark Schlereth and Sarah Kustok
- Recap, Game Book

Game information

**First quarter**

- JAX – Brian Thomas Jr. 21-yard pass from Trevor Lawrence (kick failed), 1:14. Jaguars 6–0. **Drive: 8 plays, 61 yards, 4:24.**

**Second quarter**

- SEA – Jason Myers 24-yard field goal, 10:38. Jaguars 6–3. **Drive: 10 plays, 66 yards, 5:36.**
- SEA – Jaxon Smith-Njigba 61-yard pass from Sam Darnold (Jason Myers kick), 8:34. Seahawks 10–6. **Drive: 1 play, 61 yards, 0:08.**
- SEA – Jason Myers 53-yard field goal, 0:10. Seahawks 13–6. **Drive: 6 plays, 25 yards, 0:48.**

**Third quarter**

- SEA – Cooper Kupp 11-yard pass from Sam Darnold (Jason Myers kick), 10:14. Seahawks 20–6. **Drive: 8 plays, 77 yards, 4:46.**

**Fourth quarter**

- JAX – Tim Patrick 26-yard pass from Trevor Lawrence (run failed), 13:00. Seahawks 20–12. **Drive: 14 plays, 82 yards, 7:03.**

**Top passers**

- SEA – Sam Darnold – 16/27, 295 yards, 2 TD
- JAX – Trevor Lawrence – 27/42, 258 yards, 2 TD

**Top rushers**

- SEA – Kenneth Walker III – 10 rushes, 34 yards
- JAX – Travis Etienne – 12 rushes, 27 yards

**Top receivers**

- SEA – Jaxon Smith-Njigba – 8 receptions, 162 yards, TD
- JAX – Brian Thomas Jr. – 8 receptions, 90 yards, TD

The Jaguars struggled with discipline, committing 10 penalties for 76 yards. A 54-yard touchdown pass from Trevor Lawrence to Brian Thomas Jr. was nullified due to rookie Travis Hunter lining up offside. Lawrence was also sacked a season-high seven times, and for the first time all season, the Jaguars failed to record a takeaway.

==== Week 7: vs. Los Angeles Rams ====
NFL London games

Week 7: Los Angeles Rams at Jacksonville Jaguars – Game summary

Quarter	1	2	3	4	Total
**Rams**	14	7	0	14	**35**
Jaguars	0	0	0	7	**7**

at Wembley Stadium, London, England

- Date: October 19
- Game time: 2:30 p.m. BST/9:30 a.m. EDT
- Game weather: Rain, 59 °F (15 °C)
- Game attendance: 86,152
- Referee: Adrian Hill
- TV announcers (NFLN): Rich Eisen, Kurt Warner and Sara Walsh
- Recap, Game Book

Game information

**First quarter**

- LAR – Konata Mumpfield 5-yard pass from Matthew Stafford (Joshua Karty kick), 6:38. Rams 7–0. **Drive: 13 plays, 60 yards, 6:55.**
- LAR – Davante Adams 2-yard pass from Matthew Stafford (Joshua Karty kick), 1:51. Rams 14–0. **Drive: 6 plays, 79 yards, 3:09.**

**Second quarter**

- LAR – Davante Adams 1-yard pass from Matthew Stafford (Joshua Karty kick), 4:37. Rams 21–0. **Drive: 5 plays, 60 yards, 2:21.**

**Third quarter**

- No scoring plays.

**Fourth quarter**

- LAR – Terrance Ferguson 31-yard pass from Matthew Stafford (Joshua Karty kick), 11:11. Rams 28–0. **Drive: 8 plays, 62 yards, 4:16.**
- JAX – Travis Hunter 34-yard pass from Trevor Lawrence (Cam Little kick), 9:06. Rams 28–7. **Drive: 5 plays, 80 yards, 2:05.**
- LAR – Davante Adams 1-yard pass from Matthew Stafford (Joshua Karty kick), 4:58. Rams 35–7. **Drive: 8 plays, 45 yards, 4:08.**

**Top passers**

- LAR – Matthew Stafford – 21/33, 182 yards, 5 TD
- JAX – Trevor Lawrence – 23/48, 296 yards, TD

**Top rushers**

- LAR – Kyren Williams – 12 rushes, 54 yards
- JAX – Travis Etienne – 8 rushes, 44 yards

**Top receivers**

- LAR – Colby Parkinson – 3 receptions, 47 yards
- JAX – Travis Hunter – 8 receptions, 101 yards, TD

Similar to the previous week, Jacksonville struggled with discipline, allowing 13 penalties for 119 yards. During the game, the Jaguars' first round draft pick in Travis Hunter caught his first touchdown pass.

==== Week 9: at Las Vegas Raiders ====
Week 9: Jacksonville Jaguars at Las Vegas Raiders – Game summary

Quarter	1	2	3	4	OT	Total
**Jaguars**	0	3	3	17	7	**30**
Raiders	0	6	3	14	6	**29**

at Allegiant Stadium, Paradise, Nevada

- Date: November 2
- Game time: 4:05 p.m. EDT/1:05 p.m. PDT
- Game weather: None (indoor stadium)
- Game attendance: 62,080
- Referee: Alan Eck
- TV announcers (Fox): Chris Myers, Mark Schlereth and Kristina Pink
- Recap, Game Book

Game information

**First quarter**

- No scoring plays.

**Second quarter**

- LV – Brock Bowers 7-yard pass from Geno Smith (kick failed), 0:35. Raiders 6–0. **Drive: 13 plays, 95 yards, 5:04.**
- JAX – Cam Little 68-yard field goal, 0:00. Raiders 6–3. **Drive: 4 plays, 19 yards, 0:35.**

**Third quarter**

- JAX – Cam Little 33-yard field goal, 9:53. Tied 6–6. **Drive: 7 plays, 17 yards, 4:15.**
- LV – Daniel Carlson 24-yard field goal, 6:26. Raiders 9–6. **Drive: 8 plays, 37 yards, 3:27.**

**Fourth quarter**

- JAX – Trevor Lawrence 7-yard run (Cam Little kick), 14:50. Jaguars 13–9. **Drive: 13 plays, 69 yards, 6:36.**
- LV – Ashton Jeanty 15-yard pass from Geno Smith (Daniel Carlson kick), 9:38. Raiders 16–13. **Drive: 9 plays, 69 yards, 5:12.**
- JAX – Bhayshul Tuten 1-yard run (Cam Little kick), 4:06. Jaguars 20–16. **Drive: 9 plays, 74 yards, 5:32.**
- LV – Brock Bowers 27-yard pass from Geno Smith (Daniel Carlson kick), 1:52. Raiders 23–20. **Drive: 5 plays, 62 yards, 2:14.**
- JAX – Cam Little 48-yard field goal, 0:16. Tied 23–23. **Drive: 8 plays, 42 yards, 1:36.**

**Overtime**

- JAX – Trevor Lawrence 1-yard run (Cam Little kick), 3:24. Jaguars 30–23. **Drive: 10 plays, 44 yards, 6:36.**
- LV – Brock Bowers 2-yard pass from Geno Smith (pass failed), 0:16. Jaguars 30–29. **Drive: 8 plays, 45 yards, 3:08.**

**Top passers**

- JAX – Trevor Lawrence – 23/34, 220 yards, INT
- LV – Geno Smith – 29/39, 284 yards, 4 TD, INT

**Top rushers**

- JAX – Travis Etienne – 22 rushes, 84 yards
- LV – Ashton Jeanty – 13 rushes, 42 yards

**Top receivers**

- JAX – Parker Washington – 8 receptions, 90 yards
- LV – Brock Bowers – 12 receptions, 127 yards, 3 TD

The Raiders took a 23–20 lead with less than two minutes remaining. However, they allowed the Jaguars to march down the field, and Cam Little, who had made a 68-yard field goal on the final play of the first half to set a new NFL record, converted a 48-yarder to send the game into overtime. Although the Jaguars scored a touchdown on their opening drive in overtime, the new overtime rules allowed the Raiders to respond. They marched down the field and scored a touchdown with sixteen seconds left when Raiders' quarterback Geno Smith connected with tight end Brock Bowers for a 2-yard score. Opting to go for a two-point conversion to win the game, Smith’s pass was batted down by DaVon Hamilton, sealing a one-point win for the Jaguars.

In the third quarter, defensive end Travon Walker was ejected after punching Raiders offensive lineman Stone Forsythe following a Raiders field goal. On the final play of the first half, Little made a 68-yard field goal, setting another NFL record for the longest field goal in league history, surpassing Justin Tucker's 66-yard field goal made in 2021.

==== Week 10: at Houston Texans ====
Week 10: Jacksonville Jaguars at Houston Texans – Game summary

Quarter	1	2	3	4	Total
Jaguars	10	10	9	0	**29**
**Texans**	0	10	0	26	**36**

at NRG Stadium, Houston, Texas

- Date: November 9
- Game time: 1:00 p.m. EST/12:00 p.m. CST
- Game weather: None (retractable roof closed)
- Game attendance: 70,531
- Referee: Alex Moore
- TV announcers (CBS): Ian Eagle, J. J. Watt and Evan Washburn
- Recap, Game Book

Game information

**First quarter**

- JAX – Cam Little 32-yard field goal, 11:04. Jaguars 3–0. **Drive: 7 plays, 26 yards, 2:58.**
- JAX – Parker Washington 7-yard pass from Trevor Lawrence (Cam Little kick), 8:17. Jaguars 10–0. **Drive: 5 plays, 19 yards, 2:40.**

**Second quarter**

- JAX – Parker Washington 73-yard punt return (Cam Little kick), 11:40. Jaguars 17–0.
- HOU – Matthew Wright 23-yard field goal, 8:05. Jaguars 17–3. **Drive: 8 plays, 61 yards, 3:35.**
- JAX – Cam Little 53-yard field goal, 4:02. Jaguars 20–3. **Drive: 7 plays, 40 yards, 4:03.**
- HOU – Woody Marks 1-yard run (Matthew Wright kick), 1:19. Jaguars 20–10. **Drive: 5 plays, 65 yards, 2:43.**

**Third quarter**

- JAX – Cam Little 33-yard field goal, 10:17. Jaguars 23–10. **Drive: 9 plays, 59 yards, 4:43.**
- JAX – Travis Etienne 6-yard run (pass failed), 1:33. Jaguars 29–10. **Drive: 11 plays, 58 yards, 5:52.**

**Fourth quarter**

- HOU – Jayden Higgins 12-yard pass from Davis Mills (Nico Collins-Davis Mills pass), 12:16. Jaguars 29–18. **Drive: 13 plays, 65 yards, 4:17.**
- HOU – Dalton Schultz 7-yard pass from Davis Mills (pass failed), 7:29. Jaguars 29–24. **Drive: 6 plays, 51 yards, 2:35.**
- HOU – Davis Mills 14-yard run (run failed), 0:31. Texans 30–29. **Drive: 14 plays, 93 yards, 5:39.**
- HOU – Sheldon Rankins 32-yard fumble return, 0:00. Texans 36–29.

**Top passers**

- JAX – Trevor Lawrence – 13/23, 158 yards, TD, INT
- HOU – Davis Mills – 27/45, 292 yards, 2 TD, INT

**Top rushers**

- JAX – Travis Etienne – 16 rushes, 58 yards, TD
- HOU – Woody Marks – 14 rushes, 63 yards, TD

**Top receivers**

- JAX – Jakobi Meyers – 3 receptions, 41 yards
- HOU – Nico Collins – 7 receptions, 136 yards

The Jaguars started off strong, jumping out to a 17–0 lead by capitalizing on Texans mistakes and extending their lead to 29–10 at the start of the fourth quarter. However, Texans quarterback Davis Mills threw two touchdown passes in the final period and scrambled 14 yards for the go-ahead score with 31 seconds remaining. Meanwhile, the Jaguars went three-and-out on two consecutive drives. The Jacksonville offense got the ball back with 27 seconds left to try to win the game, but Trevor Lawrence was sacked as the Texans completed their comeback victory.

The 19-point blown lead was the largest in Jaguars franchise history. Prior to this game, they were 53–0 in games where they had led by 19 or more points, including the playoffs.

It was later announced that rookie wide receiver and cornerback Travis Hunter would miss the remainder of the season after undergoing surgery to repair an isolated lateral collateral ligament (LCL) injury in his right knee.

==== Week 11: vs. Los Angeles Chargers ====
Week 11: Los Angeles Chargers at Jacksonville Jaguars – Game summary

Quarter	1	2	3	4	Total
Chargers	3	3	0	0	**6**
**Jaguars**	7	7	7	14	**35**

at EverBank Stadium, Jacksonville, Florida

- Date: November 16
- Game time: 1:00 p.m. EST
- Game weather: Mostly sunny, 74 °F (23 °C)
- Game attendance: 58,461
- Referee: Craig Wrolstad
- TV announcers (CBS): Spero Dedes, Adam Archuleta and Aditi Kinkhabwala
- Recap, Game Book

Game information

**First quarter**

- LAC – Cameron Dicker 41-yard field goal, 3:31. Chargers 3–0. **Drive: 9 plays, 35 yards, 4:41.**
- JAX – Bhayshul Tuten 4-yard run (Cam Little kick), 0:00. Jaguars 7–3. **Drive: 6 plays, 74 yards, 3:31.**

**Second quarter**

- LAC – Cameron Dicker 46-yard field goal, 8:15. Chargers 7–6. **Drive: 9 plays, 14 yards, 4:33.**
- JAX – Travis Etienne 2-yard run (Cam Little kick), 3:37. Jaguars 14–6. **Drive: 9 plays, 60 yards, 4:38.**

**Third quarter**

- JAX – Trevor Lawrence 1-yard run (Cam Little kick), 7:50. Jaguars 21–6. **Drive: 11 plays, 65 yards, 7:10.**

**Fourth quarter**

- JAX – Tim Patrick 1-yard pass from Trevor Lawrence (Cam Little kick), 11:38. Jaguars 28–6. **Drive: 16 plays, 76 yards, 9:18.**
- JAX – Travis Etienne 13-yard run (Cam Little kick), 11:02. Jaguars 35–6. **Drive: 2 plays, 13 yards, 0:13.**

**Top passers**

- LAC – Justin Herbert – 10/18, 81 yards, INT
- JAX – Trevor Lawrence – 14/22, 153 yards, TD, INT

**Top rushers**

- LAC – Justin Herbert – 3 rushes, 21 yards
- JAX – Bhayshul Tuten – 15 rushes, 74 yards, TD

**Top receivers**

- LAC – Keenan Allen – 4 receptions, 53 yards
- JAX – Jakobi Meyers – 5 receptions, 64 yards

Jacksonville finished the game with no punts for the first time since Week 2 of the 2010 season. Defensive end Josh Hines-Allen broke the franchise sack record, which had stood for more than 20 years, when he recorded his 56th career sack by bringing down Chargers quarterback Justin Herbert in the second quarter, surpassing defensive end Tony Brackens’ total of 55 sacks during his career with Jacksonville from 1996 to 2003.

==== Week 12: at Arizona Cardinals ====
Week 12: Jacksonville Jaguars at Arizona Cardinals – Game summary

Quarter	1	2	3	4	OT	Total
**Jaguars**	7	3	7	7	3	**27**
Cardinals	7	7	0	10	0	**24**

at State Farm Stadium, Glendale, Arizona

- Date: November 23
- Game time: 4:05 p.m. EST/2:05 p.m. MST
- Game weather: None (retractable roof closed)
- Game attendance: 62,413
- Referee: Scott Novak
- TV announcers (CBS): Spero Dedes, Adam Archuleta and Aditi Kinkhabwala
- Recap, Game Book

Game information

**First quarter**

- JAX – Travis Etienne 15-yard pass from Trevor Lawrence (Cam Little kick), 7:10. Jaguars 7–0. **Drive: 4 plays, 97 yards, 2:25.**
- ARI – Walter Nolen 7-yard fumble return (Chad Ryland kick), 2:26. Tied 7–7.

**Second quarter**

- JAX – Cam Little 52-yard field goal, 12:55. Jaguars 10–7. **Drive: 10 plays, 31 yards, 4:31.**
- ARI – Bam Knight 1-yard run (Chad Ryland kick), 7:31. Cardinals 14–10. **Drive: 9 plays, 65 yards, 5:24.**

**Third quarter**

- JAX – Jakobi Meyers 10-yard pass from Trevor Lawrence (Cam Little kick), 8:10. Jaguars 17–14. **Drive: 6 plays, 27 yards, 2:45.**

**Fourth quarter**

- ARI – Greg Dortch 39-yard pass from Jacoby Brissett (Chad Ryland kick), 7:12. Cardinals 21–17. **Drive: 3 plays, 41 yards, 1:27.**
- JAX – Parker Washington 9-yard pass from Trevor Lawrence (Cam Little kick), 3:47. Jaguars 24–21. **Drive: 6 plays, 65 yards, 3:25.**
- ARI – Chad Ryland 29-yard field goal, 0:03. Tied 24–24. **Drive: 8 plays, 69 yards, 1:35.**

**Overtime**

- JAX – Cam Little 52-yard field goal, 7:46. Jaguars 27–24. **Drive: 5 plays, 31 yards, 2:14.**

**Top passers**

- JAX – Trevor Lawrence – 18/30, 256 yards, 3 TD, 3 INT
- ARI – Jacoby Brissett – 33/49, 317 yards, TD

**Top rushers**

- JAX – Travis Etienne – 15 rushes, 86 yards
- ARI – Michael Carter – 5 rushes, 28 yards

**Top receivers**

- JAX – Brenton Strange – 5 receptions, 93 yards
- ARI – Michael Wilson – 10 receptions, 118 yards

Arizona was able to tie the game with three seconds left in the fourth quarter with a field goal from Chad Ryland to make it 24–24, sending the game into overtime. After winning the coin toss, the Jaguars were able to drive down the field to set up a successful field goal from Cam Little to make it 27–24. The Cardinals were unable to respond with a score after an unsuccessful fourth down pass from Jacoby Brissett downfield to Xavier Weaver, broken up by Andrew Wingard and Christian Braswell, giving the Jaguars their second overtime victory of 2025.

==== Week 13: at Tennessee Titans ====
Week 13: Jacksonville Jaguars at Tennessee Titans – Game summary

Quarter	1	2	3	4	Total
**Jaguars**	7	11	7	0	**25**
Titans	3	0	0	0	**3**

at Nissan Stadium, Nashville, Tennessee

- Date: November 30
- Game time: 1:00 p.m. EST/12:00 p.m. CST
- Game weather: Cloudy, 38 °F (3 °C)
- Game attendance: 54,098
- Referee: Brad Rogers
- TV announcers (CBS): Spero Dedes, Adam Archuleta and Aditi Kinkhabwala
- Recap, Game Book

Game information

**First quarter**

- TEN – Joey Slye 28-yard field goal, 5:06. Titans 3–0. **Drive: 11 plays, 70 yards, 5:58.**
- JAX – Jakobi Meyers 3-yard pass from Trevor Lawrence (Cam Little kick), 1:04. Jaguars 7–3. **Drive: 7 plays, 84 yards, 4:02.**

**Second quarter**

- JAX – Brenton Strange 21-yard pass from Trevor Lawrence (Trevor Lawrence run), 14:54. Jaguars 15–3. **Drive: 3 plays, 35 yards, 1:04.**
- JAX – Cam Little 45-yard field goal, 0:00. Jaguars 18–3. **Drive: 4 plays, 52 yards, 0:20.**

**Third quarter**

- JAX – Bhayshul Tuten 2-yard run (Cam Little kick), 6:45. Jaguars 25–3. **Drive: 15 plays, 71 yards, 6:36.**

**Fourth quarter**

- No scoring plays.

**Top passers**

- JAX – Trevor Lawrence – 16/27, 229 yards, 2 TD
- TEN – Cam Ward – 24/38, 141 yards

**Top rushers**

- JAX – Travis Etienne – 12 rushes, 28 yards
- TEN – Tony Pollard – 10 rushes, 60 yards

**Top receivers**

- JAX – Jakobi Meyers – 6 receptions, 90 yards, TD
- TEN – Chig Okonkwo – 4 receptions, 29 yards

The Jaguars were able to continue their win streak, and take first place in the AFC South, after the Indianapolis Colts lost to the Houston Texans, giving the Jaguars the lead in the division. During the game, an altercation between both teams occurred after Arden Key was penalized for a late hit on Lawrence. Afterwards, Titans safety Mike Brown was ejected after shoving Jaguars punter Logan Cooke.

==== Week 14: vs. Indianapolis Colts ====
Week 14: Indianapolis Colts at Jacksonville Jaguars – Game summary

Quarter	1	2	3	4	Total
Colts	7	3	3	6	**19**
**Jaguars**	14	14	0	8	**36**

at EverBank Stadium, Jacksonville, Florida

- Date: December 7
- Game time: 1:00 p.m. EST
- Game weather: Cloudy, 61 °F (16 °C)
- Game attendance: 60,067
- Referee: John Hussey
- TV announcers (CBS): Ian Eagle, J. J. Watt and Evan Washburn
- Recap, Game Book

Game information

**First quarter**

- JAX – Travis Etienne 3-yard run (Cam Little kick), 10:39. Jaguars 7–0. **Drive: 4 plays, 21 yards, 2:15.**
- IND – Jonathan Taylor 1-yard run (Blake Grupe kick), 4:32. Tied 7–7. **Drive: 11 plays, 76 yards, 6:07.**
- JAX – Jakobi Meyers 14-yard pass from Trevor Lawrence (Cam Little kick), 2:27. Jaguars 14–7. **Drive: 5 plays, 74 yards, 2:05.**

**Second quarter**

- JAX – Travis Etienne 28-yard run (Cam Little kick), 12:52. Jaguars 21–7. **Drive: 1 play, 28 yards, 0:07.**
- IND – Blake Grupe 28-yard field goal, 4:54. Jaguars 21–10. **Drive: 16 plays, 64 yards, 7:58.**
- JAX – Tim Patrick 8-yard pass from Trevor Lawrence (Cam Little kick), 0:07. Jaguars 28–10. **Drive: 12 plays, 55 yards, 1:38.**

**Third quarter**

- IND – Blake Grupe 36-yard field goal, 9:57. Jaguars 28–13. **Drive: 8 plays, 56 yards, 5:03.**

**Fourth quarter**

- JAX – Cam Little 35-yard field goal, 14:05. Jaguars 31–13. **Drive: 12 plays, 59 yards, 7:41.**
- JAX – Riley Leonard sacked in the endzone by Josh Hines-Allen for a safety, 6:57. Jaguars 33–13.
- JAX – Cam Little 48-yard field goal, 4:41. Jaguars 36–13. **Drive: 4 plays, 2 yards, 2:16.**
- IND – Riley Leonard 6-yard run (pass failed), 1:51. Jaguars 36–19. **Drive: 12 plays, 65 yards, 2:50.**

**Top passers**

- IND – Riley Leonard – 18/29, 145 yards, INT
- JAX – Trevor Lawrence – 17/30, 244 yards, 2 TD

**Top rushers**

- IND – Jonathan Taylor – 21 rushes, 74 yards, TD
- JAX – Travis Etienne – 20 rushes, 74 yards, 2 TD

**Top receivers**

- IND – Alec Pierce – 5 receptions, 80 yards
- JAX – Brian Thomas Jr. – 3 receptions, 87 yards

Colts quarterback Daniel Jones suffered an Achilles injury at the end of the first quarter that forced him out for the remainder of the game. Without Jones, the Jaguars dominated once again at home against the Colts, extending their home winning streak against Indianapolis to eleven games and improving to 9–4.

==== Week 15: vs. New York Jets ====
Week 15: New York Jets at Jacksonville Jaguars – Game summary

Quarter	1	2	3	4	Total
Jets	7	3	3	7	**20**
**Jaguars**	14	17	10	7	**48**

at EverBank Stadium, Jacksonville, Florida

- Date: December 14
- Game time: 1:00 p.m. EST
- Game weather: 70 °F (21 °C)
- Game attendance: 60,815
- Referee: Shawn Smith
- TV announcers (CBS): Tom McCarthy, Ross Tucker and Tiffany Blackmon
- Recap, Game Book

Game information

**First quarter**

- JAX – Brian Thomas Jr. 4-yard pass from Trevor Lawrence (Cam Little kick), 10:18. Jaguars 7–0. **Drive: 9 plays, 72 yards, 4:42.**
- JAX – Trevor Lawrence 15-yard run (Cam Little kick), 6:24. Jaguars 14–0. **Drive: 5 plays, 38 yards, 2:22.**
- NYJ – Adonai Mitchell 9-yard pass from Brady Cook (Nick Folk kick), 1:47. Jaguars 14–7. **Drive: 8 plays, 65 yards, 4:37.**

**Second quarter**

- JAX – Bhayshul Tuten 16-yard pass from Trevor Lawrence (Cam Little kick), 14:14. Jaguars 21–7. **Drive: 5 plays, 55 yards, 2:33.**
- NYJ – Nick Folk 41-yard field goal, 5:03. Jaguars 21–10. **Drive: 9 plays, 41 yards, 4:36.**
- JAX – Cam Little 33-yard field goal, 1:33. Jaguars 24–10. **Drive: 10 plays, 45 yards, 3:30.**
- JAX – Travis Etienne 20-yard pass from Trevor Lawrence (Cam Little kick), 0:21. Jaguars 31–10. **Drive: 5 plays, 47 yards, 0:46.**

**Third quarter**

- NYJ – Nick Folk 51-yard field goal, 10:47. Jaguars 31–13. **Drive: 9 plays, 32 yards, 4:13.**
- JAX – Travis Etienne 8-yard pass from Trevor Lawrence (Cam Little kick), 7:01. Jaguars 38–13. **Drive: 7 plays, 72 yards, 3:46.**
- JAX – Cam Little 22-yard field goal, 1:43. Jaguars 41–13. **Drive: 7 plays, 38 yards, 2:58.**

**Fourth quarter**

- NYJ – Isaiah Davis 24-yard run (Nick Folk kick), 14:08. Jaguars 41–20. **Drive: 5 plays, 65 yards, 2:35.**
- JAX – Travis Etienne 45-yard pass from Trevor Lawrence (Cam Little kick), 13:40. Jaguars 48–20. **Drive: 2 plays, 45 yards, 0:28.**

**Top passers**

- NYJ – Brady Cook – 22/33, 176 yards, TD, 3 INT
- JAX – Trevor Lawrence – 20/32, 330 yards, 5 TD

**Top rushers**

- NYJ – Isaiah Davis – 9 rushes, 58 yards, TD
- JAX – Trevor Lawrence – 5 rushes, 51 yards, TD

**Top receivers**

- NYJ – Adonai Mitchell – 6 receptions, 58 yards, TD
- JAX – Travis Etienne – 3 receptions, 73 yards, 3 TD

Jets rookie quarterback Brady Cook made his first start with the team. Despite throwing his first NFL touchdown pass, Cook also threw three interceptions to the Jaguars defense, contributing to the 48–20 win for the Jaguars. With the win, the Jaguars recorded their first double-digit win season since the 2017 season.

==== Week 16: at Denver Broncos ====
Week 16: Jacksonville Jaguars at Denver Broncos – Game summary

Quarter	1	2	3	4	Total
**Jaguars**	7	10	14	3	**34**
Broncos	0	10	7	3	**20**

at Empower Field at Mile High, Denver, Colorado

- Date: December 21
- Game time: 4:05 p.m. EST/2:05 p.m. MST
- Game weather: Partly cloudy, 62 °F (17 °C)
- Game attendance: 75,261
- Referee: Shawn Hochuli
- TV announcers (Fox): Kevin Kugler, Daryl Johnston and Allison Williams
- Recap, Game Book

Game information

**First quarter**

- JAX – Parker Washington 12-yard pass from Trevor Lawrence (Cam Little kick), 0:07. Jaguars 7–0. **Drive: 10 plays, 66 yards, 5:04.**

**Second quarter**

- DEN – Courtland Sutton 15-yard pass from Bo Nix (Wil Lutz kick), 12:46. Tied 7–7. **Drive: 5 plays, 65 yards, 2:21.**
- DEN – Wil Lutz 54-yard field goal, 9:10. Broncos 10–7. **Drive: 5 plays, 32 yards, 2:06.**
- JAX – Brenton Strange 3-yard pass from Trevor Lawrence (Cam Little kick), 4:33. Jaguars 14–10. **Drive: 8 plays, 59 yards, 4:37.**
- JAX – Cam Little 47-yard field goal, 0:00. Jaguars 17–10. **Drive: 9 plays, 58 yards, 1:48.**

**Third quarter**

- DEN – RJ Harvey 38-yard run (Wil Lutz kick), 13:01. Tied 17–17. **Drive: 4 plays, 73 yards, 1:59.**
- JAX – Trevor Lawrence 1-yard run (Cam Little kick), 7:44. Jaguars 24–17. **Drive: 9 plays, 75 yards, 5:17.**
- JAX – Travis Etienne 10-yard pass from Trevor Lawrence (Cam Little kick), 3:56. Jaguars 31–17. **Drive: 4 plays, 80 yards, 2:07.**

**Fourth quarter**

- JAX – Cam Little 26-yard field goal, 13:36. Jaguars 34–17. **Drive: 7 plays, 27 yards, 3:25.**
- DEN – Wil Lutz 21-yard field goal, 10:44. Jaguars 34–20. **Drive: 7 plays, 65 yards, 2:52.**

**Top passers**

- JAX – Trevor Lawrence – 23/36, 279 yards, 3 TD
- DEN – Bo Nix – 28/47, 352 yards, TD, INT

**Top rushers**

- JAX – Travis Etienne – 16 rushes, 50 yards
- DEN – RJ Harvey – 7 rushes, 50 yards, TD

**Top receivers**

- JAX – Parker Washington – 6 receptions, 145 yards, TD
- DEN – Courtland Sutton – 6 receptions, 86 yards, TD

The Jaguars extended their winning streak while also ending the Broncos’ 11-game overall winning streak and 12-game home winning streak. At the end of the game, Jaguars cornerback Montaric Brown made a major tackle on Broncos receiver Pat Bryant, which injured Bryant, causing him to be carted off the field.

With their first win over Denver since 2019, combined with a Colts loss to the 49ers the next day, the Jaguars clinched their first playoff berth since 2022. Jacksonville would be the only AFC South team to sweep the AFC West.

==== Week 17: at Indianapolis Colts ====
Week 17: Jacksonville Jaguars at Indianapolis Colts – Game summary

Quarter	1	2	3	4	Total
**Jaguars**	0	7	10	6	**23**
Colts	3	7	7	0	**17**

at Lucas Oil Stadium, Indianapolis, Indiana

- Date: December 28
- Game time: 1:00 p.m. EST
- Game weather: None (retractable roof closed)
- Game attendance: 66,080
- Referee: Brad Allen
- TV announcers (Fox): Joe Davis, Greg Olsen and Pam Oliver
- Recap, Game Book

Game information

**First quarter**

- IND – Blake Grupe 33-yard field goal, 11:14. Colts 3–0. **Drive: 8 plays, 29 yards, 3:46.**

**Second quarter**

- IND – Jonathan Taylor 3-yard run (Blake Grupe kick), 12:49. Colts 10–0. **Drive: 15 plays, 83 yards, 8:17.**
- JAX – Trevor Lawrence 4-yard run (Cam Little kick), 5:38. Colts 10–7. **Drive: 12 plays, 69 yards, 7:11.**

**Third quarter**

- JAX – Trevor Lawrence 6-yard run (Cam Little kick), 7:26. Jaguars 14–10. **Drive: 8 plays, 81 yards, 2:42.**
- IND – Mo Alie-Cox 5-yard pass from Philip Rivers (Blake Grupe kick), 5:58. Colts 17–14. **Drive: 8 plays, 81 yards, 2:42.**
- JAX – Cam Little 34-yard field goal, 1:25. Tied 17–17. **Drive: 10 plays, 51 yards, 4:33.**

**Fourth quarter**

- JAX – Cam Little 42-yard field goal, 6:58. Jaguars 20–17. **Drive: 4 plays, -3 yards, 0:56.**
- JAX – Cam Little 53-yard field goal, 0:18. Jaguars 23–17. **Drive: 8 plays, 13 yards, 2:48.**

**Top passers**

- JAX – Trevor Lawrence – 23/37, 263 yards, INT
- IND – Philip Rivers – 17/30, 147 yards, TD, INT

**Top rushers**

- JAX – Travis Etienne – 17 rushes, 76 yards
- IND – Jonathan Taylor – 21 rushes, 70 yards, TD

**Top receivers**

- JAX – Parker Washington – 8 receptions, 115 yards
- IND – Tyler Warren – 5 receptions, 43 yards

With their seventh straight win, their longest win streak since 1999, the Jaguars swept the Colts and improved to 12–4 (4–1 against the AFC South) for the first time since 2005 and they finished 6–2 on the road. During the game, Trevor Lawrence threw his first interception since Week 12.

==== Week 18: vs. Tennessee Titans ====
Week 18: Tennessee Titans at Jacksonville Jaguars – Game summary

Quarter	1	2	3	4	Total
Titans	7	0	0	0	**7**
**Jaguars**	7	24	3	7	**41**

at EverBank Stadium, Jacksonville, Florida

- Date: January 4
- Game time: 1:00 p.m. EST
- Game weather: Cloudy, 58 °F (14 °C)
- Game attendance: 66,015
- Referee: Scott Novak
- TV announcers (Fox): Adam Amin, Drew Brees and Kristina Pink
- Recap, Game Book

Game information

**First quarter**

- TEN – Cam Ward 7-yard run (Joey Slye kick), 10:09. Titans 7–0. **Drive: 5 plays, 58 yards, 3:22.**
- JAX – Parker Washington 23-yard pass from Trevor Lawrence (Cam Little kick), 6:02. Tied 7–7. **Drive: 7 plays, 67 yards, 4:07.**

**Second quarter**

- JAX – Brenton Strange 7-yard pass from Trevor Lawrence (Cam Little kick), 11:47. Jaguars 14–7. **Drive: 5 plays, 82 yards, 3:05.**
- JAX – Antonio Johnson 58-yard interception return (Cam Little kick), 8:07. Jaguars 21–7.
- JAX – Quintin Morris 5-yard pass from Trevor Lawrence (Cam Little kick), 1:56. Jaguars 28–7. **Drive: 9 plays, 86 yards, 5:06.**
- JAX – Cam Little 67-yard field goal, 0:00. Jaguars 31–7. **Drive: 1 play, 0 yards, 0:03.**

**Third quarter**

- JAX – Cam Little 52-yard field goal, 1:03. Jaguars 34–7. **Drive: 10 plays, 41 yards, 5:51.**

**Fourth quarter**

- JAX – Bhayshul Tuten 5-yard run (Cam Little kick), 7:28. Jaguars 41–7. **Drive: 10 plays, 51 yards, 5:55.**

**Top passers**

- TEN – Brandon Allen – 17/30, 72 yards, INT
- JAX – Trevor Lawrence – 22/30, 255 yards, 3 TD

**Top rushers**

- TEN – Tony Pollard – 14 rushes, 48 yards
- JAX – Travis Etienne – 14 rushes, 32 yards

**Top receivers**

- TEN – Elic Ayomanor – 3 receptions, 50 yards
- JAX – Parker Washington – 5 receptions, 87 yards, TD

Jaguars recorded their largest victory against the Titans with a 34-point differential and scored their most points in a game against the Titans. With the win, the Jaguars clinched the AFC South title. Jacksonville finished the season 5–1 against the AFC South and 7–2 at home.

Trevor Lawrence also set a Jaguars franchise single-season record with 38 total touchdowns, breaking the previous mark of 37 set by Blake Bortles in 2015. Additionally, the Jaguars recorded 22 interceptions during the season, establishing a new franchise single-season record and surpassing the previous mark set in 2017.

Despite the victory, the Patriots win over the Dolphins locked the Jaguars into the AFC’s third seed, setting up a Wild Card Round matchup against the Buffalo Bills.

=== Standings ===
==== Division ====
AFC South
	W	L	T	PCT	DIV	CONF	PF	PA	STK
^{(3)} Jacksonville Jaguars	13	4	0	.765	5–1	10–2	474	336	W8
^{(5)} Houston Texans	12	5	0	.706	5–1	10–2	404	295	W9
Indianapolis Colts	8	9	0	.471	2–4	6–6	466	412	L7
Tennessee Titans	3	14	0	.176	0–6	2–10	284	478	L2

==== Conference ====
AFC
Seed	Team	Division	W	L	T	PCT	DIV	CONF	SOS	SOV	STK
**Division leaders**
1 (Note: Denver finished ahead of New England based on common games (Denver 6–0 to New England 5–1 against: Cincinnati, Las Vegas, NY Giants, NY Jets and Tennessee).)	Denver Broncos	West	14	3	0	.824	5–1	9–3	.422	.378	W2
2	New England Patriots	East	14	3	0	.824	5–1	9–3	.391	.370	W3
3	Jacksonville Jaguars	South	13	4	0	.765	5–1	10–2	.478	.425	W8
4	Pittsburgh Steelers	North	10	7	0	.588	4–2	8–4	.503	.453	W1
**Wild cards**
5 (Note: Houston finished ahead of Buffalo based on head-to-head victory.)	Houston Texans	South	12	5	0	.706	5–1	10–2	.522	.441	W9
6	Buffalo Bills	East	12	5	0	.706	4–2	9–3	.471	.412	W1
7	Los Angeles Chargers	West	11	6	0	.647	5–1	8–4	.469	.425	L2
**Did not qualify for the postseason**
8 (Note: Indianapolis finished ahead of Baltimore based on conference record (Indianapolis 6–6 to Baltimore 5–7).)	Indianapolis Colts	South	8	9	0	.471	2–4	6–6	.540	.382	L7
9	Baltimore Ravens	North	8	9	0	.471	3–3	5–7	.507	.408	L1
10	Miami Dolphins	East	7	10	0	.412	3–3	3–9	.488	.378	L1
11 (Note: Cincinnati finished ahead of Kansas City based on conference record (Cincinnati 5–7 to Kansas City 3–9).)	Cincinnati Bengals	North	6	11	0	.353	3–3	5–7	.521	.451	L1
12	Kansas City Chiefs	West	6	11	0	.353	1–5	3–9	.514	.363	L6
13	Cleveland Browns	North	5	12	0	.294	2–4	4–8	.486	.418	W2
14 (Note: Las Vegas finished ahead of NY Jets and Tennessee based on conference record (Las Vegas 3–9 to NY Jets 2–10 and Tennessee 2–10).)	Las Vegas Raiders	West	3	14	0	.176	1–5	3–9	.538	.451	W1
15 (Note: NY Jets finished ahead of Tennessee based on strength of victory (NY Jets .373 to Tennessee .275).)	New York Jets	East	3	14	0	.176	0–6	2–10	.552	.373	L5
16	Tennessee Titans	South	3	14	0	.176	0–6	2–10	.574	.275	L2
**Tiebreakers** (Note: When breaking ties for three or more teams under the NFL's rules, they are first broken within divisions, then comparing only the highest ranked remaining team from each division.)

== Postseason ==
=== Schedule ===
Round	Date	Opponent (seed)	Result	Record	Venue	Recap
Wild Card	January 11	Buffalo Bills (6)	L 24–27	0–1	EverBank Stadium	Recap

=== Game summaries ===
==== AFC Wild Card Playoffs: vs. (6) Buffalo Bills ====
AFC Wild Card Playoffs: (6) Buffalo Bills at (3) Jacksonville Jaguars – Game summary

Quarter	1	2	3	4	Total
Bills	3	7	3	14	27
Jaguars	0	7	3	14	24

at EverBank Stadium, Jacksonville, Florida

- Date: January 11, 2026
- Game time: 1:00 p.m. EST
- Game weather: Cloudy, 62 °F (17 °C)
- Game attendance: 70,250
- Referee: Brad Allen
- TV announcers (CBS): Jim Nantz, Tony Romo, and Tracy Wolfson
- Recap, Game Book

Game information

First quarter

- BUF – Matt Prater 50-yard field goal, 2:54. Bills 3–0. Drive: 4 plays, 1 yard, 2:21.

Second quarter

- JAX – Brian Thomas Jr. 3-yard pass from Trevor Lawrence (Cam Little kick), 14:14. Jaguars 7–3. Drive: 7 plays, 65 yards, 3:40.
- BUF – Josh Allen 2-yard run (Matt Prater kick), 5:37. Bills 10–7. Drive: 10 plays, 92 yards, 5:42.

Third quarter

- BUF – Matt Prater 47-yard field goal, 8:12. Bills 13–7. Drive: 11 plays, 45 yards, 6:48.
- JAX – Cam Little 43-yard field goal, 5:47. Bills 13–10. Drive: 6 plays, 40 yards, 2:25.

Fourth quarter

- JAX – Parker Washington 6-yard pass from Trevor Lawrence (Cam Little kick), 12:55. Jaguars 17–13. Drive: 11 plays, 62 yards, 6:03.
- BUF – Dalton Kincaid 15-yard pass from Josh Allen (Matt Prater kick), 8:56. Bills 20–17. Drive: 9 plays, 65 yards, 3:59.
- JAX – Travis Etienne 14-yard pass from Trevor Lawrence (Cam Little kick), 4:03. Jaguars 24–20. Drive: 10 plays, 77 yards, 4:53.
- BUF – Josh Allen 1-yard run (Matt Prater kick), 1:04. Bills 27–24. Drive: 9 plays, 66 yards, 2:59.

Top passers

- BUF – Josh Allen – 28/35, 273 yards, TD
- JAX – Trevor Lawrence – 18/30, 207 yards, 3 TD, 2 INT

Top rushers

- BUF – James Cook – 15 rushes, 46 yards
- JAX – Travis Etienne – 10 rushes, 67 yards

Top receivers

- BUF – Khalil Shakir – 12 receptions, 82 yards
- JAX – Parker Washington – 7 receptions, 107 yards, TD
