= James Gladstone (American football) =

American football executive (born 1990)

Jacksonville Jaguars
- Title: General manager

Personal information
- Born: June 18, 1990 (age 36); St. Louis, Missouri, U.S.

Career information
- Position: Wide receiver
- College: Westminster (MO) (2009–2012)

Career history

Coaching
- St. John Vianney HS (MO) (2013) Assistant Coach; Clayton HS (MO) (2014–2015) Assistant Coach

Operations
- Los Angeles Rams (2016–2017) Senior assistant to general manager; Los Angeles Rams (2018) Senior assistant to general manager & player personnel coordinator; Los Angeles Rams (2019–2020) Director of scouting strategy; Los Angeles Rams (2021) Director of scouting; Los Angeles Rams (2022–2024) Director of scouting strategy; Jacksonville Jaguars (2025–present) General manager

Awards and highlights
- Super Bowl champion (LVI)
- Executive profile at Pro Football Reference

James Michael Gladstone (born June 18, 1990) is an American professional football executive who is the general manager of the Jacksonville Jaguars of the National Football League (NFL). He previously served in various scouting positions for the Los Angeles Rams from 2016 to 2024 before being named general manager of the Jaguars in 2025.

== Early life and college ==
Gladstone was born in June 1990 in St. Louis, Missouri. He attended Westminster College in Fulton, Missouri, where he played wide receiver for the Blue Jays football team and graduated with a secondary education degree in 2013. Gladstone worked as a teacher and football coach at St. John Vianney, his alma mater, and Clayton High School. In 2016, he earned a Master's degree in secondary education administration from Lindenwood University.

== Executive career ==
=== Los Angeles Rams (2016–2024) ===
Gladstone was hired by the Los Angeles Rams in 2016 as a senior assistant to general manager Les Snead, meeting him through his son Logan who he had coached previously at Clayton High School. In 2018, Gladstone was promoted to player personnel coordinator. Two years later, he was promoted to director of scouting strategy. The following season, during which Gladstone was promoted to director of scouting, the Rams won Super Bowl LVI. In 2022, he shifted back to director of scouting strategy.

=== Jacksonville Jaguars (2025–present) ===
On February 21, 2025, Gladstone was named the general manager of the Jacksonville Jaguars. Hired at age 34, he is currently the youngest general manager in the NFL. In the offseason, the Jaguars cut Devin Duvernay, Evan Engram, and Gabe Davis while signing Robert Hainsey, Chuma Edoga, Dyami Brown, Hunter Long, Nick Mullens, Johnny Mundt, Jourdan Lewis, and Eric Murray. In the 2025 NFL draft, the Jaguars traded up three places from the fifth to the second pick and selected Heisman Trophy winner Travis Hunter out of Colorado.

== Personal life ==
Gladstone and his wife, Julie, have two children together.
