= Parker Washington =

American football player (born 2002)

No. 11 – Jacksonville Jaguars
- Positions: Wide receiver, punt returner
- Roster status: Active

Personal information
- Born: March 21, 2002 (age 24); Starkville, Mississippi, U.S.
- Listed height: 5 ft 10 in (1.78 m)
- Listed weight: 204 lb (93 kg)

Career information
- High school: Fort Bend Travis (Richmond, Texas)
- College: Penn State (2020–2022)
- NFL draft: 2023: 6th round, 185th overall pick

Career history
- Jacksonville Jaguars (2023–present)

Career NFL statistics as of Week 10, 2026
- Receptions: 142
- Receiving yards: 2,014
- Receiving average: 14.2
- Receiving touchdowns: 16
- Total return yards: 908
- Return touchdowns: 3
- Stats at Pro Football Reference

Christopher Parker Washington (born March 21, 2002) is an American professional football wide receiver and punt returner for the Jacksonville Jaguars of the National Football League (NFL). He played college football for the Penn State Nittany Lions and was drafted by the Jaguars in the sixth round of the 2023 NFL draft.

== Early life ==
Washington was born on March 21, 2002, in Starkville, Mississippi. He attended Travis High School in Pecan Grove, Texas. Washington played baseball, basketball and football. In football, he had 160 receptions for 2,800 yards and 36 touchdowns.

College recruiting
Name	Hometown	School	Height	Weight	Commit date
Parker Washington; WR	Sugar Land, Texas	Travis High School	5 ft 10 in (1.78 m)	201 lb (91 kg)	Jul 2, 2019
Parker Washington; WR	Recruit ratings: Rivals: 247Sports: ESPN:				
Overall recruit ranking:
Note: In many cases, Scout, Rivals, 247Sports, On3, and ESPN may conflict in their listings of height and weight.; In these cases, the average was taken. ESPN grades are on a 100-point scale.; Sources: "2020 Team Ranking". Rivals.com.

== College career ==
As a freshman at Penn State, Washington started all nine games for the Nittany Lions. He became the first true freshman since Brandon Polk in 2015 to start the season opener for the Nittany Lions. On October 24, 2020, in Penn State's season-opener against Indiana, Washington caught his first career touchdown to give the Nittany Lions a lead in overtime. Against Maryland, Washington caught two touchdown passes and earned the coaching staff's Offensive Player of the Week. Against Michigan, Washington had 9 receptions for 93 yards. Two weeks later, against Michigan State, he set a new career high with 95 receiving yards and two touchdowns.

Washington had 36 receptions for 500 yards and 6 receiving touchdowns as a true freshman, and was named a second-team Freshman All-American by The Athletic. He ranked first among Big Ten freshmen in receptions, yards, and touchdowns.

=== Statistics ===
Team	GP	Receiving				Kickoff Return		
Team	GP	Rec	Yards	Avg	TD	KR	Yds	TD
2020	9	36	489	13.6	6	5	100	0
2021	13	64	820	12.8	4	0	0	0
2022	10	46	611	13.3	2	0	0	0
Career	32	146	1,920	13.2	12	5	100	0

== Professional career ==
Pre-draft measurables
Height	Weight	Arm length	Hand span	Wingspan	Bench press
5 ft 9 3/4 in (1.77 m)	204 lb (93 kg)	29 in (0.74 m)	10 1/8 in (0.26 m)	6 ft 0 in (1.83 m)	16 reps
All values from NFL Combine

=== 2023 season ===
Washington was selected by the Jacksonville Jaguars in the sixth round (185th overall) of the 2023 NFL draft. His Penn State teammate, tight end Brenton Strange, was also drafted by Jacksonville, in the second round (61st overall). He was placed on injured reserve on October 7, 2023. Washington was activated on November 18. On December 4, during Week 13 game against the Cincinnati Bengals, Washington scored his first NFL touchdown. He finished his rookie season with 16 receptions for 132 yards and two touchdowns in nine games and one start.

=== 2024 season ===
In Week 7 against the New England Patriots in London, during the second quarter, Washington returned a punt starting at the four-yard line, before finding open space and going 96 yards for his first career punt return touchdown. His 96-yard punt return was the longest punt return of the 2024 season. It was also the longest punt return touchdown in Jaguars' franchise history, beating Keelan Cole who took it 90 yards in 2020. The Jaguars would manage to win, 32–16. During Week 13, Washington had six receptions for 103 yards and a touchdown in the 23–20 loss to the Texans. In the 2024 season, he finished with 32 receptions for 390 yards and three touchdowns.

=== 2025 season ===
Washington, before the season, entered as the second wide receiver on the depth chart behind second overall pick, Travis Hunter. With the departure of Devin Duvernay to free agency, Washington became the starting punt returner for the team. In Week 4 against the San Francisco 49ers, during the third quarter, Washington returned a punt from the 13-yard line, and ran 87 yards for the touchdown in the 26–21 win. In Week 10, Washington returned a punt from the 27-yard line and went 73 yards for the touchdown in the 36–29 loss to the Houston Texans. In Week 16 of the 2025 season, Washington had six receptions for 145 yards and one touchdown in the 34–20 road win over the Denver Broncos. In the 2025 season, Washington had 58 receptions for 847 yards and five touchdowns, while having 25 punt returns for 341 yards and two touchdowns. In the Wild Card Round, he had seven receptions for 107 yards and a touchdown in the 27–24 loss to the Buffalo Bills.

=== 2026 season ===
Entering the 2026 season, he entered as the starting WR1 in the Jaguars’ depth chart for the first time in his career. In Week 5 against the Philadelphia Eagles in London, Washington had six receptions for 124 yards and two touchdowns, including a one-handed touchdown catch over Riq Woolen during the fourth quarter in the 19–17 win. Against the Tennessee Titans, Washington caught seven receptions for a career-high 152 receiving yards and a touchdown in the 40–23 win.

== NFL career statistics ==
Legend
	Led the league
**Bold**	Career high

=== Regular season ===
Year	Team	Games		Receiving					Returning										Fumbles	
Year	Team	Games		Receiving					Punt returns					Kick returns					Fumbles	
Year	Team	GP	GS	Rec	Yds	Avg	Lng	TD	Ret	Yds	Avg	Lng	TD	Ret	Yds	Avg	Lng	TD	Fum	Lost
2023	JAX	9	1	16	132	8.3	19	2	12	126	10.5	26	0	2	51	**25.5**	**33**	0	**2**	**1**
2024	JAX	**17**	7	32	390	12.2	30	3	6	144	**24.0**	**96**	1	**5**	**122**	24.4	30	0	**2**	0
2025	JAX	16	7	**58**	**847**	14.6	**63**	5	**25**	**341**	13.6	87	**2**	3	75	25.0	32	0	**2**	0
2026	JAX	9	9	36	645	**17.9**	51	**6**	10	49	4.9	12	0	0	0	0	0	0	1	0
Career		51	24	142	2,014	14.2	63	16	53	660	12.4	96	3	10	248	24.8	33	0	7	1

=== Postseason ===
Year	Team	Games		Receiving				
Year	Team	GP	GS	Rec	Yds	Avg	Lng	TD
2025	JAX	1	1	7	107	15.3	34	1
Career		1	1	7	107	15.3	34	1

== Personal life ==
Washington's sister Ashton was hired as the first female scout for the Chicago Bears in 2021. His cousin, Joshua Dobbs, played college football at Tennessee and was drafted by the Pittsburgh Steelers in the fourth round of the 2017 NFL draft. Dobbs also played for the Jaguars in 2019. Another cousin, Tyler Tolbert, is a professional baseball player in the Kansas City Royals organization.
