= Montaric Brown =

American football player (born 1999)

No. 1 – Jacksonville Jaguars
- Position: Cornerback
- Roster status: Active

Personal information
- Born: August 24, 1999 (age 27); Ashdown, Arkansas, U.S.
- Listed height: 6 ft 0 in (1.83 m)
- Listed weight: 190 lb (86 kg)

Career information
- High school: Ashdown
- College: Arkansas (2017–2021)
- NFL draft: 2022: 7th round, 222nd overall pick

Career history
- Jacksonville Jaguars (2022–present)

Awards and highlights
- First-team All-SEC (2021)

Career NFL statistics as of 2025
- Total tackles: 166
- Pass deflections: 24
- Interceptions: 3
- Stats at Pro Football Reference

Montaric "Buster" Brown (born August 24, 1999) is an American professional football cornerback for the Jacksonville Jaguars of the National Football League (NFL). He played college football for the Arkansas Razorbacks.

== Early life ==
Montaric Brown was born on August 24, 1999 in Ashdown, Arkansas, a small, tight-knit community in Southwest Arkansas near the borders of Texas and Oklahoma. He is the son of Danica, his mother, and Patrick Brown, his biological father. Brown was raised primarily by his mother and his stepfather, Eddie Richard.

Brown attended Ashdown High School, where he played football as a wide receiver and safety. During his senior season, he totaled 110 tackles, seven interceptions, and 52 receptions. Brown committed to play college football for the Arkansas Razorbacks.

== Professional career ==
Pre-draft measurables
Height	Weight	Arm length	Hand span	Wingspan	40-yard dash	10-yard split	20-yard split	20-yard shuttle	Three-cone drill	Vertical jump	Broad jump	Bench press
6 ft 0 3/8 in (1.84 m)	196 lb (89 kg)	31 1/4 in (0.79 m)	9 1/2 in (0.24 m)	6 ft 4 in (1.93 m)	4.55 s	1.58 s	2.65 s	4.44 s	7.27 s	34.0 in (0.86 m)	10 ft 2 in (3.10 m)	11 reps
All values from NFL Combine/Pro Day

Brown was selected with the 222nd overall pick in the seventh round of the 2022 NFL draft.

After primarily playing on special teams with minimal time on defense as a rookie, Brown earned a part-time role on defense in 2023, starting six of 12 games played playing over half of the defensive snaps. He earned a full-time starting job in 2024, playing in all 17 games with 10 starts, recording 75 tackles, eight passes defensed, and one interception. He followed that up with a 12-start season in 2025, recording 51 tackles, two interceptions, and a team-leading 12 passes defensed.

On March 9, 2026, Brown signed a three-year, $33 million contract extension with the Jaguars.

=== Professional statistics ===
Legend
**Bold**	Career high

=== Regular season ===
Year	Team	Games		Tackles					Fumbles				Interceptions					
Year	Team	GP	GS	Cmb	Solo	Ast	Sck	TFL	FF	FR	Yds	TD	PD	Int	Yds	Avg	Lng	TD
2022	JAX	8	1	6	4	2	0.0	0	0	0	0	0	0	0	0	0.0	0	0
2023	JAX	12	6	34	25	9	0.0	0	0	0	0	0	4	0	0	0.0	0	0
2024	JAX	17	10	**75**	**55**	**20**	0.0	**6**	0	0	0	0	8	1	0	0.0	0	0
2025	JAX	15	12	51	43	8	0.0	0	0	0	0	0	**12**	**2**	0	0.0	0	0
Career		52	29	166	127	39	0.0	6	0	0	0	0	24	3	0	0.0	0	0

=== Postseason ===
Year	Team	Games		Tackles					Fumbles				Interceptions					
Year	Team	GP	GS	Cmb	Solo	Ast	Sck	TFL	FF	FR	Yds	TD	PD	Int	Yds	Avg	Lng	TD
2025	JAX	1	1	6	4	2	0.0	0	0	0	0	0	0	0	0	0.0	0	0
Career		1	1	6	4	2	0.0	0	0	0	0	0	0	0	0	0.0	0	0
