= Brenton Strange =

American football player (born 2000)

No. 85 – Jacksonville Jaguars
- Position: Tight end
- Roster status: Active

Personal information
- Born: December 27, 2000 (age 25); Eden, North Carolina, U.S.
- Listed height: 6 ft 4 in (1.93 m)
- Listed weight: 253 lb (115 kg)

Career information
- High school: Parkersburg (Parkersburg, West Virginia)
- College: Penn State (2019–2022)
- NFL draft: 2023: 2nd round, 61st overall pick

Career history
- Jacksonville Jaguars (2023–present)

Awards and highlights
- Third-team All-Big Ten (2022)

Career NFL statistics as of Week 10, 2026
- Receptions: 123
- Receiving yards: 1,351
- Receiving touchdowns: 8
- Stats at Pro Football Reference

Brenton Lamont Strange (born December 27, 2000) is an American professional football tight end for the Jacksonville Jaguars of the National Football League (NFL). He played college football for the Penn State Nittany Lions.

== Early life ==
Strange was born on December 27, 2000, in Eden, North Carolina. He attended Parkersburg High School, where he had 57 receptions for 938 yards and 12 touchdowns for their football team as a junior. Strange was rated a four-star recruit and committed to play college football at Penn State over offers from Ohio State, Notre Dame, and Purdue.

== College career ==
Strange played in two games as a true freshman and caught one pass for a four-yard touchdown reception before redshirting the season. He played in nine games with five starts and had 17 receptions for 164 yards and two touchdowns in his redshirt freshman season. Strange caught 20 passes for 225 yards and three touchdowns as a redshirt sophomore. He began his redshirt junior season as the Nittany Lions' primary tight end and made 32 catches for 362 yards and five touchdowns.

== Professional career ==
Pre-draft measurables
Height	Weight	Arm length	Hand span	Wingspan	40-yard dash	10-yard split	20-yard split	20-yard shuttle	Three-cone drill	Vertical jump	Broad jump	Bench press
6 ft 3 7/8 in (1.93 m)	253 lb (115 kg)	31 1/8 in (0.79 m)	9 5/8 in (0.24 m)	6 ft 3 1/8 in (1.91 m)	4.70 s	1.57 s	2.68 s	4.46 s	7.25 s	36.0 in (0.91 m)	10 ft 4 in (3.15 m)	23 reps
All values from the NFL Combine

Strange was selected by the Jacksonville Jaguars in the second round, 61st overall, of the 2023 NFL draft. His Penn State teammate, wide receiver and return specialist Parker Washington, was also drafted by Jacksonville, in the sixth round, 185th overall. In Week 6 of the 2023 season, he scored his first NFL touchdown against the Colts. As a rookie, he appeared in 14 games and made four starts. He finished with five receptions for 35 yards and a touchdown. In the 2024 season, he had 40 receptions for 411 yards and two touchdowns.

Strange recorded 20 catches for 204 yards in five games for Jacksonville prior to suffering a quad injury in Week 5 against the Kansas City Chiefs. He was placed on injured reserve on October 7, 2025. Strange was activated on November 22, ahead of the team's Week 12 matchup against the Arizona Cardinals.

On June 25, 2026, Strange signed a three-year, $48 million contract extension with $25 million guaranteed with the Jaguars, keeping him with the team through the 2029 season.

== NFL career statistics ==
=== Regular season ===
Legend
**Bold**	Career high

Year	Team	Games		Receiving					Fumbles	
Year	Team	GP	GS	Rec	Yds	Avg	Lng	TD	Fum	Lost
2023	JAX	14	4	5	35	7	17	1	0	0
2024	JAX	**17**	10	40	411	10.3	30	2	1	1
2025	JAX	12	**12**	**46**	**540**	**11.7**	30	**3**	0	0
2026	JAX	9	9	32	365	11.4	**46**	2	1	0
Career		52	35	123	1,351	11.0	46	8	2	1

=== Postseason ===
Year	Team	Games		Receiving					Fumbles	
Year	Team	GP	GS	Rec	Yds	Avg	Lng	TD	Fum	Lost
2025	JAX	1	1	2	9	4.5	9	0	0	0
Career		1	1	2	9	4.5	9	0	0	0
