= Danny Striggow =

American football player (born 2002)

No. 92 – Jacksonville Jaguars
- Position: Defensive end
- Roster status: Active

Personal information
- Born: July 24, 2002 (age 24); Long Lake, Minnesota, U.S.
- Listed height: 6 ft 5 in (1.96 m)
- Listed weight: 255 lb (116 kg)

Career information
- High school: Orono (Long Lake, Minnesota)
- College: Minnesota (2020–2024)
- NFL draft: 2025: undrafted

Career history
- Jacksonville Jaguars (2025–present)

Career NFL statistics as of Week 18, 2025
- Total tackles: 16
- Sacks: 0.5
- Fumble recoveries: 1
- Stats at Pro Football Reference

Danny Striggow (born July 24, 2002) is an American professional football defensive end for the Jacksonville Jaguars of the National Football League (NFL). He played college football for the Minnesota Golden Gophers.

== Early life ==
Striggow attended Orono High School in Long Lake, Minnesota, where he won a state title in wrestling in addition to playing football. He decided to pursue football instead of wrestling, committing to play college football for the Minnesota Golden Gophers.

== College career ==
As a freshman in 2020, Striggow appeared in three games and took a redshirt. In 2021, he recorded one tackle in 12 games. In week 4 of the 2022 season, Striggow recorded his first career interception in a win over Michigan State. He finished the 2022 season with 20 tackles with four and a half being for a loss, three and a half sacks, two pass deflections, and an interception. In 2023, Striggow totaled 51 tackles with seven being for a loss, six sacks, and a forced fumble for Minnesota. In his final season with the Gophers in 2024, he notched 52 tackles with five and a half being for a loss, five sacks, a forced fumble, and a fumble recovery. Striggow was named to the All-Big Ten Conference team as an honorable mention for the third straight year. After the season, he declared for the 2025 NFL draft and participated in multiple bowls, competing in the Hula Bowl and the Reese's Senior Bowl. Striggow was especially notable during the Hula Bowl where he met with multiple NFL teams.

== Professional career ==
Pre-draft measurables
| Height | Weight | Arm length | Hand span | Wingspan | 40-yard dash | 10-yard split | 20-yard split | 20-yard shuttle | Three-cone drill | Vertical jump | Broad jump | Bench press |
|---|---|---|---|---|---|---|---|---|---|---|---|---|
| 6 ft 4 in (1.93 m) | 253 lb (115 kg) | 32 1/4 in (0.82 m) | 9 3/4 in (0.25 m) | 6 ft 8 1/2 in (2.04 m) | 4.84 s | 1.70 s | 2.76 s | 4.33 s | 7.07 s | 33.0 in (0.84 m) | 9 ft 8 in (2.95 m) | 21 reps |
All values from Pro Day

On April 27, 2025, Striggow signed with the Jacksonville Jaguars as an undrafted free agent.

== Personal life ==
Striggow's two older brothers, Bobby and Jackson, both wrestled at the University of Michigan. He also has an older sister, Hannah, who played volleyball at the University of Wisconsin–River Falls.
