= Keivie Rose =

American football player (born 2000)

Profile
- Position: Defensive lineman

Personal information
- Born: December 14, 2000 (age 25); Henderson, Texas, U.S.
- Listed height: 6 ft 3 in (1.91 m)
- Listed weight: 314 lb (142 kg)

Career information
- High school: Henderson (2016–2019) (Henderson, Texas)
- College: Louisiana Tech (2019–22); Arkansas (2023–24)
- NFL draft: 2025: undrafted

Career history
- Jacksonville Jaguars (2025–2026)*
- * Offseason or practice squad member only

Awards and highlights
- First Team All-Conference USA (2022)
- Stats at Pro Football Reference

Del'Keiveon Ke'Unta "Keivie" Rose (born December 14, 2000) is an American professional football defensive lineman. He played college football for the Louisiana Tech Bulldogs and Arkansas Razorbacks.

== Early life ==
Rose was born on December 14, 2000 in Henderson, Texas. He was one of three children born to Lakeyshia Medford. Being 6 ft 3 in (1.91 m) tall and weighing 242 pounds (110 kg) Rose was a dual-sport athlete playing for the Henderson Lions basketball and football teams. He played tight end and defensive end positions in football and center in basketball. In his senior year in 2018, Rose helped the Henderson Lions football team to a 9-5 record and was named to the all-district first team. Rose was rated a three-star recruiting prospect by 247Sports.com and received over 20 athletic scholarship offers.

== College career ==
=== Louisiana Tech University ===
Rose enrolled at Louisiana Tech University in 2019 and joined the Bulldogs team during the season opening game against Texas before redshirting the remainder of the season. He would go on to retain his redshirt status for the remainder of his time at Louisiana Tech. In 2020, Rose played in all 10 games, making eight starts as a defensive tackle. He made 23 total tackles for the season. In his sophomore season in 2021, Rose started all 12 games over which he recorded 25 total tackles. He played his junior season in 2022 in which he was a starting defensive tackle in all 12 games, recording 24 total tackles that earned him first-team all conference honors.

=== University of Arkansas ===
Rose transferred to Arkansas in August 2023. In his redshirt senior season in 2023, Rose joined the field with the Razorbacks in all 12 games with two starting games. He recorded a total of 15 tackles in his Razorbacks debut. In his final season during 2024, Rose tallied 19 tackles.

== Professional career ==
Pre-draft measurables
Height	Weight	Arm length	Hand span	Wingspan	40-yard dash	10-yard split	20-yard split	20-yard shuttle	Three-cone drill	Vertical jump	Broad jump	Bench press
6 ft 2 7/8 in (1.90 m)	303 lb (137 kg)	34 in (0.86 m)	9 1/4 in (0.23 m)	6 ft 8 1/4 in (2.04 m)	5.07 s	1.77 s	2.85 s	4.78 s	7.55 s	24.5 in (0.62 m)	8 ft 9 in (2.67 m)	30 reps
All values from Pro Day

Rose was signed by the Jacksonville Jaguars as an undrafted free agent following the 2025 NFL draft. He was waived on August 26, 2025, as a part of final roster cuts. Rose was re-signed to the team's practice squad the following day. He signed a reserve/future contract with Jacksonville on January 12, 2026.

On August 30, 2026, Rose was waived/injured by the Jaguars. On September 5, Rose was waived by Jacksonville with an injury settlement.
