= Doneiko Slaughter =

American football player (born 2001)

No. 40 – Pittsburgh Steelers
- Position: Cornerback
- Roster status: Active

Personal information
- Born: November 8, 2001 (age 24); Atlanta, Georgia, U.S.
- Listed height: 5 ft 11 in (1.80 m)
- Listed weight: 195 lb (88 kg)

Career information
- High school: Decatur (Decatur, Georgia) Roswell (Roswell, Georgia)
- College: Tennessee (2020–2023); Arkansas (2024)
- NFL draft: 2025: undrafted

Career history
- Jacksonville Jaguars (2025)*; Pittsburgh Steelers (2026–present)
- * Offseason or practice squad member only
- Stats at Pro Football Reference

Doneiko "Neiko" Slaughter (born November 8, 2001) is an American professional football cornerback for the Pittsburgh Steelers of the National Football League (NFL). He played college football for the Tennessee Volunteers and Arkansas Razorbacks.

== Early life ==
Slaughter was born on November 8, 2001, in Atlanta, Georgia, to Judy Martinez and Jeremy Slaughter. He played high school football at Decatur High School and Roswell High School as an outside linebacker, running back, free safety, and strong safety. During his junior year at Roswell in 2018, Slaughter led the Hornets with eight sacks. In his senior season in 2019, Slaughter helped the Hornets to win the district championship. In addition to being a recipient of the Gene Felty Men's Athletic Endowed Scholarship student, Slaughter was rated a three-star recruit by 247Sports.com and received over ten athletic scholarship offers.

== College career ==
=== Tennessee ===
Slaughter played as a defensive back for the University of Tennessee Volunteers. As a freshman in 2020, he started one game and totaled eight tackles. He played 11 games during the 2021 season as reservist, recording 16 tackles. During his junior season in 2022, Slaughter was promoted to starting defensive back, making two starts as a safety and five starts as a cornerback during the course of 12 games. In his senior season in 2023, he tallied 11 tackles. Slaughter twice made the SEC Academic Honor Roll while he majored in economics. He was scouted as early as July 2023 as a prospect for the 2024 NFL draft.

=== Arkansas ===
Slaughter used the extra year of eligibility granted to college athletes due to the COVID-19 pandemic, enrolling at the University of Arkansas for his final year of collegiate athletics.

Slaughter played as starting defensive back in 13 games in 2024, registering a career-high 80 tackles.

== Professional career ==
Pre-draft measurables
| Height | Weight | Arm length | Hand span | Wingspan | 40-yard dash | 10-yard split | 20-yard split | 20-yard shuttle | Three-cone drill | Vertical jump | Broad jump | Bench press |
|---|---|---|---|---|---|---|---|---|---|---|---|---|
| 5 ft 11 1/4 in (1.81 m) | 195 lb (88 kg) | 31 3/8 in (0.80 m) | 9 in (0.23 m) | 6 ft 1 1/2 in (1.87 m) | 4.39 s | 1.56 s | 2.52 s | 4.41 s | 7.30 s | 36.0 in (0.91 m) | 9 ft 11 in (3.02 m) | 17 reps |
All values from Pro Day

=== Jacksonville Jaguars ===
Slaughter was signed by the Jacksonville Jaguars as an undrafted free agent following the 2025 NFL draft. He was waived by Jacksonville on August 26 as part of final roster cuts.

=== Pittsburgh Steelers ===
On January 20, 2026, Slaughter signed a reserve/futures contract with the Pittsburgh Steelers. Slaughter was waived by the Steelers on August 30 as a part of final roster cuts; he was re-signed to the team's practice squad the following day. He played in each of the Steelers' first three games and was then signed to the active roster on October 1. On October 5, he was waived and re-signed to the practice squad two days later. On October 10, Slaughter was signed back to the active roster.

== Personal life ==
Slaughter has six brothers. On November 19, 2023, Slaughter was issued two misdemeanor citations by the University of Tennessee Police Department for reckless driving after a game against Georgia.
