= Patrick Herbert (American football) =

American football player (born 2000)

No. 81 – Los Angeles Chargers
- Position: Tight end
- Roster status: Practice squad

Personal information
- Born: October 18, 2000 (age 26); Eugene, Oregon, U.S.
- Listed height: 6 ft 5 in (1.96 m)
- Listed weight: 255 lb (116 kg)

Career information
- High school: Sheldon (Eugene, Oregon)
- College: Oregon (2019–2024)
- NFL draft: 2025: undrafted

Career history
- Jacksonville Jaguars (2025); Los Angeles Chargers (2026–present)

Career NFL statistics as of Week 3, 2026
- Games played: 1
- Stats at Pro Football Reference

Patrick Herbert (born October 18, 2000) is an American professional football tight end for the Los Angeles Chargers of the National Football League (NFL). He played college football for the Oregon Ducks.

== Early life ==
Herbert was born in Eugene, Oregon where he attended Sheldon High School. He played as a tight end and punter with the Fighting Irish football team. His senior year performance helped the Fighting Irish win a Southwest Conference championship. Herbert was also a three-year letterman. He was rated a four-star recruiting prospect by 247Sports.com and received a total of six athletic scholarship offers.

== College career ==
Completing enrollment at the University of Oregon in April 2019, Herbert joined the field as a tight end with the Oregon Ducks on September 7 during the game against Nevada. After recovering from injuries sustained in his redshirt freshman seasons during 2020 and 2021, Herbert returned to the field in 2022 for all 13 games. In his junior season in 2023, Herbert started four of the season's 14 total games. In 2024 as a senior tight end, Herbert started six of the season's 14 games. After six seasons, Herbert finished his college career with 31 catches for 388 yards and four touchdowns.

== Professional career ==
Pre-draft measurables
Height	Weight	Arm length	Hand span	Wingspan	40-yard dash	10-yard split	20-yard split	20-yard shuttle	Three-cone drill	Vertical jump	Broad jump	Bench press
6 ft 5 in (1.96 m)	249 lb (113 kg)	33 1/8 in (0.84 m)	9 7/8 in (0.25 m)	6 ft 6 3/4 in (2.00 m)	4.79 s	1.79 s	2.83 s	4.45 s	7.09 s	31.0 in (0.79 m)	9 ft 6 in (2.90 m)	13 reps
All values from Pro Day

=== Jacksonville Jaguars ===
On April 26, 2025, Herbert was signed by the Jacksonville Jaguars as an undrafted free agent following the 2025 NFL draft. He was signed to the practice squad after being cut from the active roster on August 27. Herbert signed a reserve/future contract with Jacksonville on January 12, 2026.

On August 30, 2026, Herbert was waived by the Jaguars as a part of final roster cuts.

=== Los Angeles Chargers ===
On August 31, 2026, Herbert was signed to the Los Angeles Chargers' practice squad.

== Career statistics ==
=== College ===
Year	Team	Games		Receiving			
Year	Team	GP	GS	Rec	Yds	Avg	TD
2019	Oregon	2	0	Redshirted (redshirt)			
2020	Oregon	0	0	Did not play due to injury			
2021	Oregon	0	0	Did not play due to injury			
2022	Oregon	13	0	6	95	15.8	1
2023	Oregon	14	4	15	196	13.1	3
2024	Oregon	14	6	10	97	9.7	0
Career		43	10	31	388	12.5	4

== Personal life ==
Herbert is the younger brother of NFL quarterback Justin Herbert with whom he played one season of college football at Oregon in 2019. His brother was selected sixth overall by the Los Angeles Chargers in the 2020 NFL draft.
