= Johnny Mundt =

American football player (born 1994)

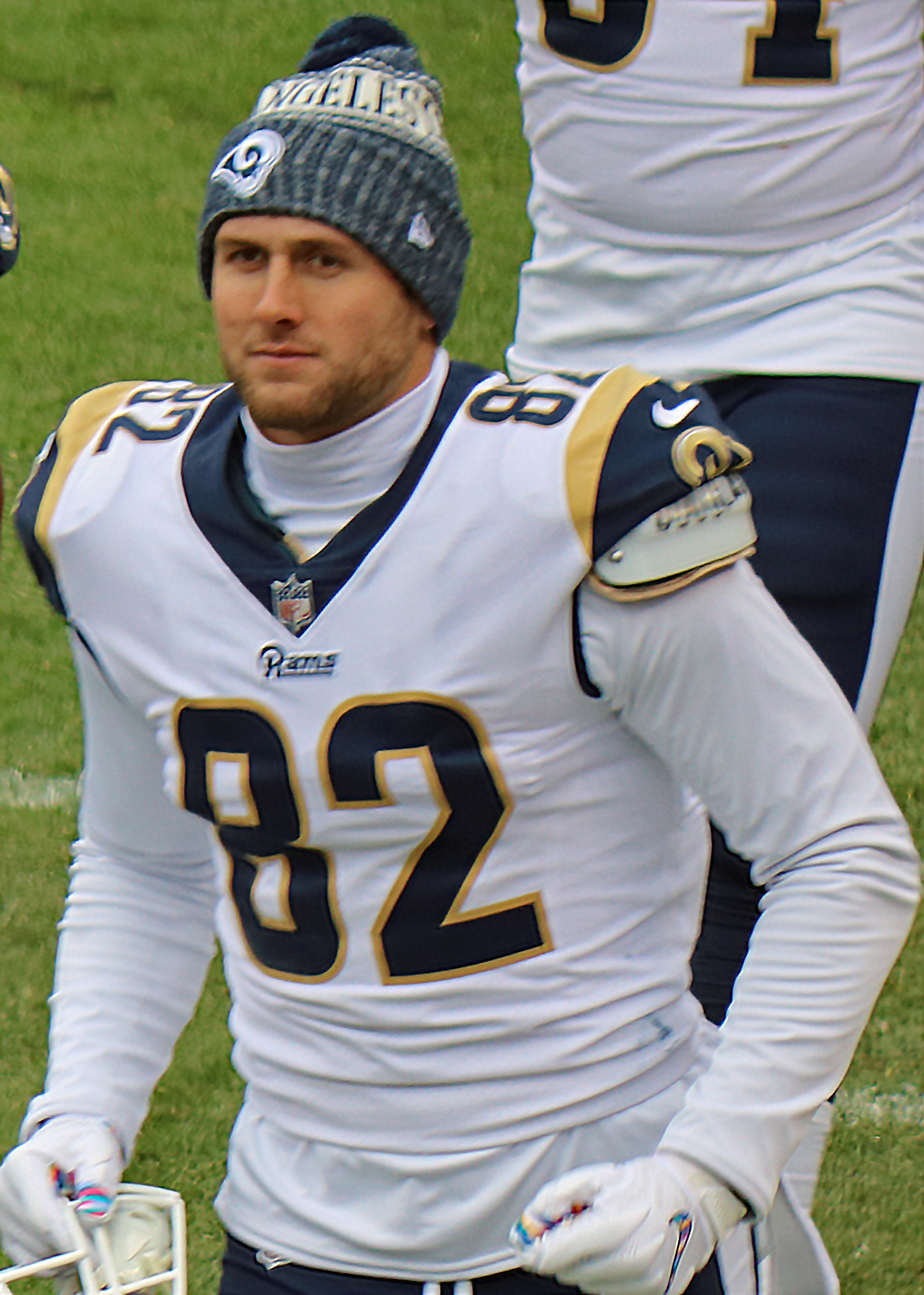
- Mundt with the Los Angeles Rams in 2018

No. 83 – Philadelphia Eagles
- Position: Tight end
- Roster status: Active

Personal information
- Born: November 23, 1994 (age 31); Hughson, California, U.S.
- Listed height: 6 ft 4 in (1.93 m)
- Listed weight: 245 lb (111 kg)

Career information
- High school: Central Catholic (Modesto, California)
- College: Oregon (2013–2016)
- NFL draft: 2017: undrafted

Career history
- Los Angeles Rams (2017–2021); Minnesota Vikings (2022–2024); Jacksonville Jaguars (2025); Philadelphia Eagles (2026–present)

Awards and highlights
- Super Bowl champion (LVI)

Career NFL statistics as of 2025
- Receptions: 74
- Receiving yards: 658
- Receiving touchdowns: 4
- Stats at Pro Football Reference

John Christian Mundt (born November 23, 1994) is an American professional football tight end for the Philadelphia Eagles of the National Football League (NFL). He played college football for the Oregon Ducks.

== Professional career ==
Pre-draft measurables
Height	Weight	Arm length	Hand span	Wingspan	40-yard dash	10-yard split	20-yard split	20-yard shuttle	Three-cone drill	Vertical jump	Broad jump	Bench press
6 ft 4 1/4 in (1.94 m)	243 lb (110 kg)	32 3/8 in (0.82 m)	9 5/8 in (0.24 m)	6 ft 7 in (2.01 m)	4.74 s	1.62 s	2.72 s	4.24 s	7.21 s	30.0 in (0.76 m)	9 ft 5 in (2.87 m)	21 reps
All values from Pro Day

=== Los Angeles Rams ===
Mundt signed with the Los Angeles Rams as an undrafted free agent on April 29, 2017. Mundt had a solid preseason competing with fellow rookie Travis Wilson for the team's possible third tight end spot behind Tyler Higbee and Gerald Everett. He was waived by the Rams on September 3, 2017, and was re-signed to the practice squad. He was promoted to the active roster on November 11, 2017. He was waived by the Rams on November 21, 2017, and was re-signed to the practice squad. He signed a reserve/future contract with the Rams on January 8, 2018.

Mundt re-signed on a one-year exclusive-rights free agent contract with the Rams on April 17, 2020. He signed another one-year contract on March 18, 2021. He suffered a torn ACL in Week 6 and was placed on injured reserve on October 19, 2021. Without Mundt, the Rams won Super Bowl LVI against the Cincinnati Bengals.

=== Minnesota Vikings ===
On March 16, 2022, Mundt signed a two-year contract with the Minnesota Vikings.

On March 8, 2024, Mundt re-signed with the Vikings.

=== Jacksonville Jaguars ===
On March 12, 2025, Mundt signed with the Jacksonville Jaguars. He made 16 appearances (including six starts) for Jacksonville, recording nine receptions for 111 scoreless yards. On March 10, 2026, Mundt was released by the Jaguars.

=== Philadelphia Eagles ===
On March 13, 2026, Mundt signed a one-year contract with the Philadelphia Eagles.
