= Hunter Long =

American football player (born 1998)

No. 89 – Arizona Cardinals
- Position: Tight end
- Roster status: Active

Personal information
- Born: August 19, 1998 (age 28); Exeter, New Hampshire, U.S.
- Listed height: 6 ft 5 in (1.96 m)
- Listed weight: 243 lb (110 kg)

Career information
- High school: Exeter; Deerfield Academy (Deerfield, Massachusetts)
- College: Boston College (2017–2020)
- NFL draft: 2021: 3rd round, 81st overall pick

Career history
- Miami Dolphins (2021–2022); Los Angeles Rams (2023–2024); Jacksonville Jaguars (2025); Arizona Cardinals (2026–present)

Awards and highlights
- Second-team All-American (2020); First-team All-ACC (2020); Third-team All-ACC (2019)

Career NFL statistics as of Week 4, 2026
- Receptions: 22
- Receiving yards: 168
- Receiving touchdowns: 2
- Stats at Pro Football Reference

Hunter Long (born August 19, 1998) is an American professional football tight end for the Arizona Cardinals of the National Football League (NFL). He played college football for the Boston College Eagles and was selected by the Miami Dolphins in the third round of the 2021 NFL draft.

== Early life ==
Long grew up in Exeter, New Hampshire. He graduated from Exeter High School before doing a postgraduate year at Deerfield Academy in Deerfield, Massachusetts. He played tight end and defensive end in high school. As a senior he had 30 receptions for 508 yards with two touchdowns and had seven sacks. He committed to Boston College to play college football.

== College career ==
Long redshirted his first year at Boston College in 2017. In 2018, he played in 12 games and had four receptions for 103 yards and two touchdowns. In 2019, Long had 28 receptions for 509 yards with two touchdowns. He returned as the starting tight end in 2020 where he had 57 receptions for 685 yards and 5 touchdowns.

== Professional career ==
Pre-draft measurables
Height	Weight	Arm length	Hand span	Wingspan	40-yard dash	10-yard split	20-yard split	20-yard shuttle	Three-cone drill	Vertical jump	Broad jump
6 ft 5 in (1.96 m)	254 lb (115 kg)	33 3/4 in (0.86 m)	9 1/2 in (0.24 m)	6 ft 10 in (2.08 m)	4.68 s	1.61 s	2.69 s	4.42 s	7.41 s	32.5 in (0.83 m)	10 ft 2 in (3.10 m)
All values from Pro Day

=== Miami Dolphins ===
Long was selected by the Miami Dolphins in the third round (81st overall) of the 2021 NFL draft. He signed his four-year rookie contract with Miami on July 26, 2021.

=== Los Angeles Rams ===
On March 15, 2023, Long and a 2023 third-round draft pick (which was previously acquired from the New England Patriots) were traded to the Los Angeles Rams in exchange for cornerback Jalen Ramsey. He was placed on injured reserve on September 9, 2023 with a thigh injury. He was activated on November 14.

On December 8, 2024, Long scored his first NFL touchdown on a 22-yard blocked punt return during the Rams' 44–42 win over the Buffalo Bills.

=== Jacksonville Jaguars ===
On March 12, 2025, Long signed a two-year, $3 million contract with the Jacksonville Jaguars. He played in nine games with three starts, recording 12 catches for 85 yards and two touchdowns, missing multiple games due to hip and knee injuries.

=== Arizona Cardinals ===
On August 30, 2026, Long was traded to the Arizona Cardinals for a swap of 2028 sixth- and seventh-round picks.
