= Robert Hainsey =

American football player (born 1998)

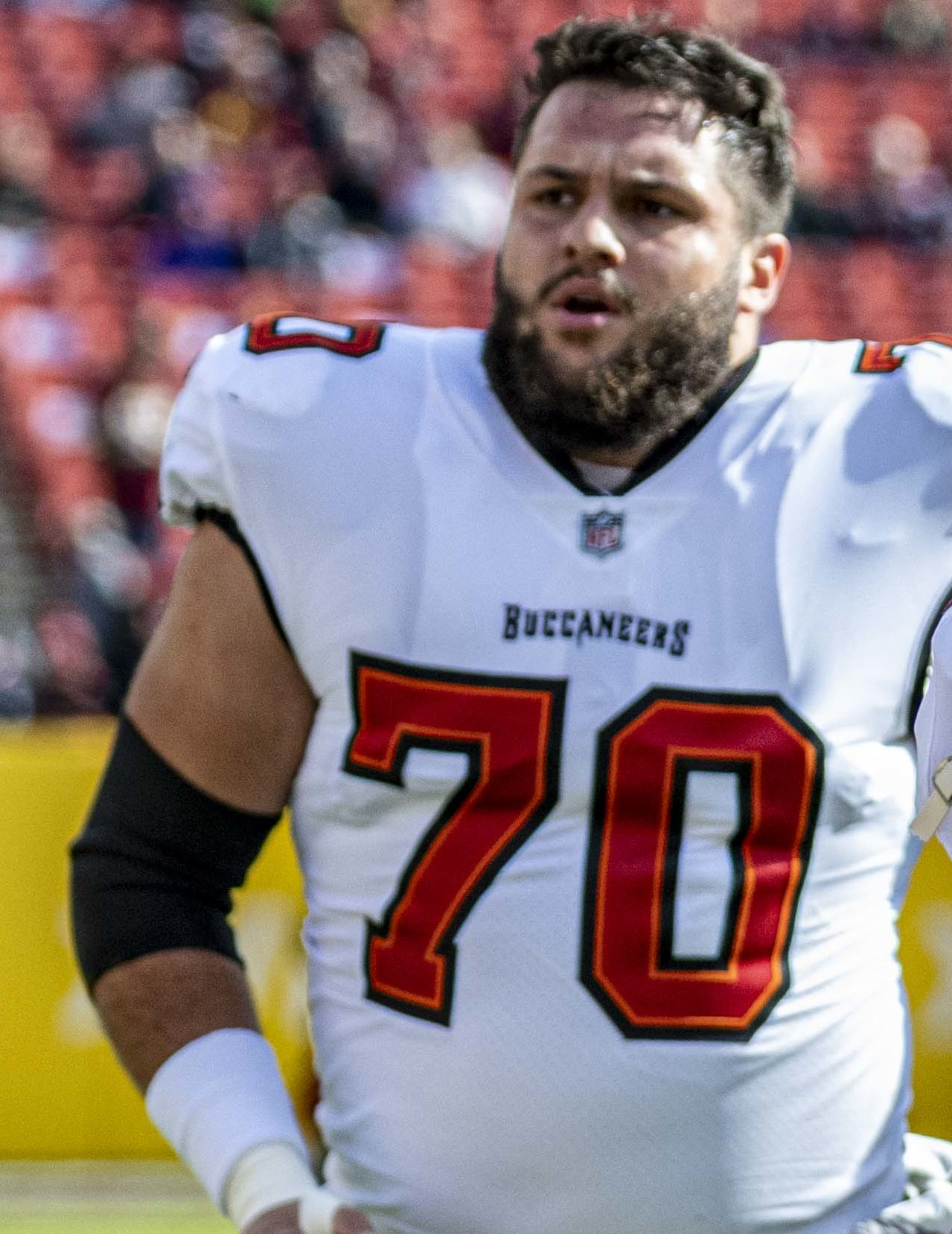
- Hainsey with the Tampa Bay Buccaneers in 2021

No. 73 – Jacksonville Jaguars
- Position: Center
- Roster status: Active

Personal information
- Born: August 12, 1998 (age 28); Pittsburgh, Pennsylvania, U.S.
- Listed height: 6 ft 4 in (1.93 m)
- Listed weight: 306 lb (139 kg)

Career information
- High school: IMG (Bradenton, Florida)
- College: Notre Dame (2017–2020)
- NFL draft: 2021: 3rd round, 95th overall pick

Career history
- Tampa Bay Buccaneers (2021–2024); Jacksonville Jaguars (2025–present)

Career NFL statistics as of Week 4, 2026
- Games played: 79
- Games started: 54
- Stats at Pro Football Reference

Robert W. Hainsey (born August 12, 1998) is an American professional football center for the Jacksonville Jaguars of the National Football League (NFL). He played college football for the Notre Dame Fighting Irish.

== College career ==
He was a 2020 senior class award finalist and was named to the 2020 All-Atlantic Coast Conference second team.

== Professional career ==
Pre-draft measurables
Height	Weight	Arm length	Hand span	Wingspan	40-yard dash	10-yard split	20-yard split	20-yard shuttle	Three-cone drill	Vertical jump	Broad jump	Bench press
6 ft 4 1/2 in (1.94 m)	306 lb (139 kg)	32 1/8 in (0.82 m)	9 7/8 in (0.25 m)	6 ft 5 7/8 in (1.98 m)	5.21 s	1.80 s	2.85 s	4.64 s	7.53 s	27.5 in (0.70 m)	8 ft 8 in (2.64 m)	32 reps
All values from Pro Day

=== Tampa Bay Buccaneers ===
Hainsey was selected by the Tampa Bay Buccaneers in the third round, 95th overall, of the 2021 NFL draft. He signed his four-year rookie contract with Tampa Bay on July 21, 2021.

=== Jacksonville Jaguars ===
On March 12, 2025, Hainsey signed with the Jacksonville Jaguars on a three-year, $21 million contract.
