= 2025 Cleveland Browns season =

77th season in franchise history

- Owner: Jimmy Haslam
- General manager: Andrew Berry
- Head coach: Kevin Stefanski
- Home stadium: Huntington Bank Field

Results
- Record: 5–12
- Division place: 4th AFC North
- Playoffs: Did not qualify
- All-Pros: DE Myles Garrett (1st team)
- Pro Bowlers: DE Myles Garrett; CB Denzel Ward; QB Shedeur Sanders

Uniform
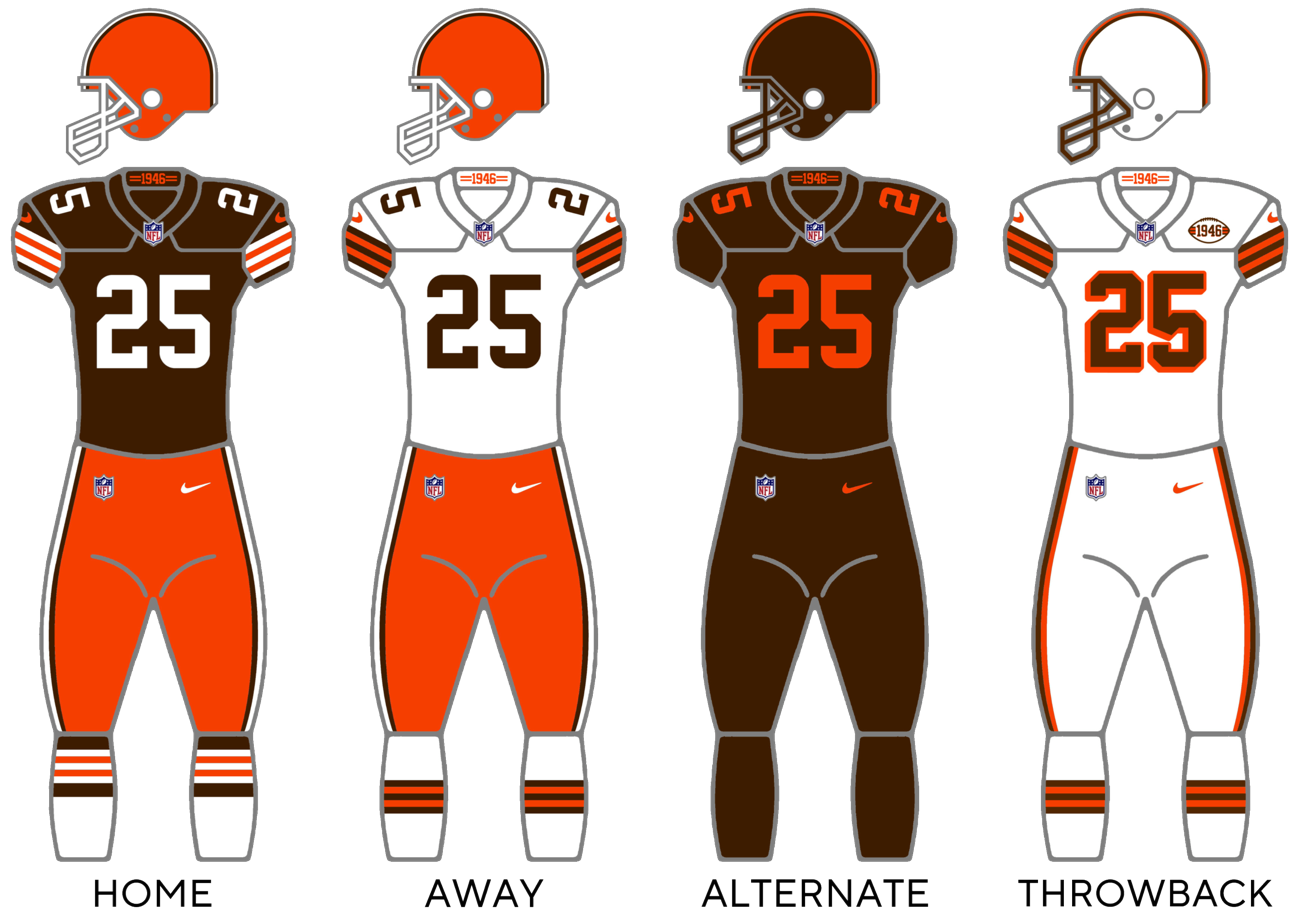

The 2025 season was the Cleveland Browns' 73rd as a member of the National Football League (NFL), their 77th overall, their sixth under general manager Andrew Berry, and their sixth and final under head coach Kevin Stefanski. The Browns improved on their 3–14 record from the previous season. However, they clinched their second consecutive losing season and 16th in 18 years, and failed to qualify for the playoffs for the second straight year.

Myles Garrett set the record for most sacks in a season, with 23. The previous record of 22.5 was shared by Michael Strahan and T. J. Watt.

On January 5, 2026, one day after the end of the season, Stefanski was fired by the Browns after six seasons with the team.

The Cleveland Browns drew an average home attendance of 67,431, the 19th-highest of all NFL teams.

== Offseason ==
=== Staff changes ===
On January 5, one day after the 2024 season ended, the Browns fired offensive coordinator Ken Dorsey and offensive line coach Andy Dickerson, both after one season with the team.

On January 8, the Browns hired former Rice University head coach Mike Bloomgren as their new offensive line coach.

On January 14, the Browns promoted tight ends coach and passing game specialist Tommy Rees to offensive coordinator to replace Dorsey.

=== Roster changes ===
==== Free agents ====
2025 Cleveland Browns Free Agents
Pos.	Player	Tag	2025 Team	Signed
OT	Hakeem Adeniji	UFA	Dallas Cowboys	April 18
TE	Jordan Akins	UFA		
S	D'Anthony Bell	RFA	Seattle Seahawks	March 22
CB	Tony Brown	UFA	Cleveland Browns	March 20
LB	Devin Bush Jr.	UFA	Cleveland Browns	March 12
OT	Geron Christian	UFA	Dallas Cowboys	August 2
RB	Nick Chubb	UFA	Houston Texans	June 9
G	Michael Dunn	UFA	San Francisco 49ers	August 20
DT	Michael Dwumfour	ERFA	San Francisco 49ers	August 7
CB	Mike Ford	UFA	Atlanta Falcons	March 17
RB	D'Onta Foreman	UFA		
C	Nick Harris	UFA	Washington Commanders	August 22
DE	James Houston	RFA	Dallas Cowboys	July 22
OT	James Hudson	UFA	New York Giants	March 12
LS	Charley Hughlett	Release	Philadelphia Eagles	March 14
DT	Maurice Hurst Jr.	UFA		
OT	Germain Ifedi	UFA	Miami Dolphins	August 3
RB	John Kelly	ERFA		
WR	Elijah Moore	UFA	Buffalo Bills	April 30
WR	James Proche	UFA	Tennessee Titans	March 26
TE	Geoff Swaim	UFA		
S	Juan Thornhill	Release	Pittsburgh Steelers	March 17
DT	Dalvin Tomlinson	Release	Arizona Cardinals	March 12
OT	Jedrick Wills	UFA		
QB	Jameis Winston	UFA	New York Giants	March 21
QB	Bailey Zappe	RFA	Kansas City Chiefs	March 17

==== Signings ====
2025 Cleveland Browns Free Agents
Pos.	Player	2024 Team	Signed
LB	Jerome Baker	Tennessee Titans	March 24
WR	DeAndre Carter	Chicago Bears	March 19
DT	Maliek Collins	San Francisco 49ers	March 12
QB	Joe Flacco	Indianapolis Colts	April 11
G	Teven Jenkins	Chicago Bears	March 20
WR	Diontae Johnson	Baltimore Ravens	April 28
OT	Cornelius Lucas	Washington Commanders	March 12
DE	Julian Okwara	Arizona Cardinals	April 14
DE	Joe Tryon-Shoyinka	Tampa Bay Buccaneers	March 12

==== Trades ====
2025 Cleveland Browns Offseason Trades
Date	Team	Player(s)/Asset(s) Received	Player(s)/Asset(s) Traded
March 12	Philadelphia Eagles	QB Kenny Pickett	QB Dorian Thompson-Robinson; 2025 5th round selection
August 20	New York Jets	2026 6th round selection	DT Jowon Briggs; 2026 7th round selection
August 25	Las Vegas Raiders	2026 5th round selection	QB Kenny Pickett
August 26	Los Angeles Rams	T KT Leveston	2028 7th round selection

==== Draft ====
2025 Cleveland Browns draft selections
Round	Selection	Player	Position	College	Notes
1	2	Traded to the Jacksonville Jaguars (Note: The Browns traded the 2nd overall pick, a fourth round selection (104th overall) and a sixth round selection (200th overall) to the Jaguars in exchange for the 5th overall pick, a second-round selection (36th overall) a fourth-round selection (126th overall) and a 2026 first-round selection.)			
1	5	Mason Graham	DT	Michigan	From Jaguars
2	33	Carson Schwesinger	LB	UCLA	
2	36	Quinshon Judkins	RB	Ohio State	From Jaguars
3	67	Harold Fannin Jr.	TE	Bowling Green	
3	94	Dillon Gabriel	QB	Oregon	From Bills (Note: The Browns traded a sixth-round selection (204th overall) and WR Amari Cooper to the Buffalo Bills in exchange for a third-round selection (94th overall) and a 2026 seventh-round selection.)
4	104	Traded to the Jacksonville Jaguars			
4	126	Dylan Sampson	RB	Tennessee	From Vikings via Jaguars
5	139	Traded to the Minnesota Vikings (Note: The Browns traded a fifth-round selection (139th overall) and a 2024 fifth-round selection to the Minnesota Vikings in exchange for sixth- and seventh-round selections (200th and 240th overall), and DE Za'Darius Smith.)			
5	144	Shedeur Sanders	QB	Colorado	From Patriots via Seahawks
5	164	Traded to the Philadelphia Eagles (Note: The Browns traded a fifth-round selection (164th overall) and QB Dorian Thompson-Robinson to the Eagles in exchange for QB Kenny Pickett.)			From Lions (Note: The Browns traded a 2026 seventh-round selection and DE Za'Darius Smith to the Detroit Lions in exchange for a fifth-round selection (164th overall) and a 2026 sixth-round selection.)
5	166	Traded to the Seattle Seahawks			From Texans (Note: The Browns traded two sixth-round selections (179th overall and 216th overall) and a seventh-round selection (255th overall) to the Texans for a 2025 fifth round selection (166th overall) and a 2027 fifth-round selection.)
6	179	Traded to the Houston Texans			
6	192	Traded to the Seattle Seahawks			From Dolphins via Bears (Note: The Browns traded a seventh-round selection (240th overall) and DT Chris Williams to the Chicago Bears in exchange for a sixth-round selection (192nd overall).)
6	200	Traded to the Jacksonville Jaguars			From Vikings
6	204	Traded to the Buffalo Bills			From Lions (Note: The Browns traded WR Donovan Peoples-Jones to the Detroit Lions in exchange for a sixth-round selection (204th overall).)
6	216	Traded to the Houston Texans			Compensatory selection
7	218	Traded to the Los Angeles Chargers (Note: The Browns traded a seventh-round selection (218th overall) to the Los Angeles Chargers in exchange for K Dustin Hopkins.)			
7	240	Traded to the Chicago Bears			From Vikings
7	255	Traded to the Houston Texans			Compensatory selection

Undrafted free agents
Name	Position	College	Ref.
Adin Huntington	DE	Tulane	
Jason Ivey	OT	North Carolina A&T	
LaMareon James	CB	TCU	
Dom Jones	CB	Colorado State	
Gage Larvadain	WR	South Carolina	
Ahmani Marshall	RB	Appalachian State	
Easton Mascarenas-Arnold	LB	USC	
Brent Matiscik	LS	TCU	
Donovan McMillon	S	Pittsburgh	
Justin Osborne	C	SMU	
Ja'Seem Reed	WR	San Diego	
Dartanyan Tinsley	G	Cincinnati	
Eli Wilson	FB	Appalachian State	
Luke Floriea	WR	Kent State	
Kisean Johnson	WR	Western Kentucky	
Cade McDonald	WR	Miami (OH)	
Winston Wright Jr.	WR	East Carolina	

Draft trades

== Personnel ==
=== Staff / Coaches ===
2025 Cleveland Browns staff
Front office: Principal partners – Jimmy Haslam, Dee Haslam; Managing partner – Whitney Haslam Johnson; Partner/Executive vice president – J. W. Johnson; Limited partner – Charles Woodson; President – David Jenkins; Executive vice president of football operations/general manager – Andrew Berry; Vice president of football operations/assistant general manager – Catherine Hickman; Vice president of football administration – Chris Cooper; Director of football administration – Taylor Young; Director of player personnel – Adam Al-Khayyal; Director of college scouting – Max Paulus; Senior personnel/coaching executive – Bob Quinn; Senior executive advisor to the GM – Jimmy Raye III; Advisor to the GM – Chris Polian; Director of football operations & process – Joy Tapajcik; Football operations assistant – Hunter Carson; Vice President of research and strategy – Dave Giuliani; Director of scouting research – Mike Cetta; Director of football information systems – Brad DeAngelis; Head coaches: Head coach – Kevin Stefanski; Assistant head coach/special teams coordinator – Ray Ventrone; Offensive coaches: Offensive coordinator – Tommy Rees; Quarterbacks – Bill Musgrave; Running backs – Duce Staley; Pass game coordinator/wide receivers – Chad O'Shea; Assistant wide receivers – Stephen Bravo-Brown; Tight ends – Christian Jones; Offensive line – Mike Bloomgren; Assistant offensive line – Sanders Davis; Assistant offensive line – Ben Wilkerson; Pass game specialist – Nick Charlton; Bill Willis diversity coaching fellow – Nemo Washington	Defensive coaches: Defensive coordinator – Jim Schwartz; Defensive line – Jacques Cesaire; Assistant defensive line – Adam Morris; Linebackers – Jason Tarver; Cornerbacks – Brandon Lynch; Safeties – Ephraim Banda; Defensive assistant – Zach Dunn; Defensive quality control – Jeff Anderson; Special teams coaches: Assistant special teams – Kyle Hoke; Strength and conditioning: Director, strength and conditioning – Larry Jackson; Player Development Coordinator - Anthony Fabiano; Assistant strength and conditioning/sports science – Josh Christovich; Assistant strength and conditioning – Monty Gibson; Assistant strength and conditioning – Dale Jones; Assistant strength and conditioning – Ty Taylor; Assistant of Performance Nutrition - Grace Kennedy; Director of performance nutrition – Kelsey Fahy

=== Final roster ===
2025 Cleveland Browns roster
Quarterbacks (QB): 8 Dillon Gabriel; 12 Shedeur Sanders; Running backs (RB): 22 Dylan Sampson; 35 Raheim Sanders; 38 Trayveon Williams; Wide receivers (WR): 16 Isaiah Bond; 83 Malachi Corley; 3 Jerry Jeudy; 84 Gage Larvadain; 80 Jamari Thrash; 19 Cedric Tillman; Tight ends (TE): 82 Brenden Bates; 44 Harold Fannin Jr.; 85 David Njoku; 86 Blake Whiteheart	Offensive linemen (OL): 75 Joel Bitonio G; 63 Jeremiah Byers T; 65 Kingsley Eguakun C; 52 Kendrick Green C; 74 Teven Jenkins G; 72 KT Leveston T; 71 Cornelius Lucas T; 68 Cam Robinson T; 56 Luke Wypler C; 70 Zak Zinter G; Defensive linemen (DL): 95 Myles Garrett DE; 94 Mason Graham DT; 51 Mike Hall Jr. DT; 93 Shelby Harris DT; 98 Adin Huntington DT; 92 Sam Kamara DT/DE; 57 Isaiah McGuire DE; 99 Cameron Thomas DE; 91 Alex Wright DE	Linebackers (LB): 17 Jerome Baker OLB; 30 Devin Bush Jr. OLB; 43 Mohamoud Diabate OLB; 42 Easton Mascarenas-Arnold OLB; 54 Edefuan Ulofoshio MLB; Defensive backs (DB): 28 Tre Avery CB; 7 Tyson Campbell CB; 9 Grant Delpit SS; 41 Chris Edmonds SS; 26 Myles Harden CB; 33 Ronnie Hickman FS; 5 Rayshawn Jenkins SS; 31 Donovan McMillon FS; 20 D'Angelo Ross CB; 21 Denzel Ward CB; 27 Sam Webb CB; Special teams (ST): 13 Corey Bojorquez P; 50 Rex Sunahara LS; 25 Andre Szmyt K	Practice squad: 87 Sal Cannella TE; 67 Jack Conley G; 66 Keith Cooper DE; 61 Darrian Dalcourt G; 89 Kaden Davis WR; 81 Luke Floriea WR; 62 Wesley French G; 90 KJ Henry DE; 97 Maurice Hurst II DT; 23 Ahmani Marshall RB; 53 Julian Okwara DE (PS/I); 69 Tyre Phillips RT; 88 Caden Prieskorn TE; 29 Dee Williams CB; 11 Bailey Zappe QB; Reserve: 2 DeAndre Carter WR (IR); 96 Maliek Collins DT (IR); 78 Jack Conklin T (IR); 1 Martin Emerson CB (IR); 34 Jerome Ford RB (IR); 79 Dawand Jones T (IR); 37 Dom Jones CB (IR); 10 Quinshon Judkins RB (IR); -- Anthony Kendall CB (IR); -- Justin Osborne C (IR); 6 Jeremiah Owusu-Koramoah OLB (PUP); 55 Ethan Pocic C (IR); 59 Winston Reid OLB (IR/DFR); 49 Carson Schwesinger MLB (IR); 77 Wyatt Teller G (IR); 4 Deshaun Watson QB (PUP); 40 Nathaniel Watson MLB (IR); Rookies in italics 53 active, 17 reserve, 14 practice squad (1 exempt)

== Preseason ==
=== Schedule ===
Week	Date	Opponent	Result	Record	Venue	Recap
1	August 8	at Carolina Panthers	W 30–10	1–0	Bank of America Stadium	Recap
2	August 16	at Philadelphia Eagles	W 22–13	2–0	Lincoln Financial Field	Recap
3	August 23	Los Angeles Rams	W 19–17	3–0	Huntington Bank Field	Recap

=== Game summaries ===
==== Preseason Week 1: at Carolina Panthers ====
Preseason Week 1: Cleveland Browns at Carolina Panthers – Game summary

Quarter	1	2	3	4	Total
Browns	0	14	7	9	30
Panthers	7	0	0	3	10

at Bank of America Stadium, Charlotte, North Carolina

- Date: August 8
- Game time: 7:00 p.m. EDT
- Game weather: Cloudy, 78 °F (26 °C)
- Game attendance: 71,205
- Referee: Clay Martin
- TV announcers (WEWS): Chris Rose, Joe Thomas and Aditi Kinkhabwala
- Recap, Game Book

Game information

First quarter

- CAR – Jalen Coker 5-yard pass from Bryce Young (Matthew Wright kick), 3:36. Panthers 7–0. Drive: 9 plays, 73 yards, 4:35.

Second quarter

- CLE – Kaden Davis 7-yard pass from Shedeur Sanders (Dustin Hopkins kick), 14:54. Tied 7–7. Drive: 2 plays, 10 yards, 0:42.
- CLE – Kaden Davis 12-yard pass from Shedeur Sanders (Dustin Hopkins kick), 1:04. Browns 14–7. Drive: 5 plays, 60 yards, 1:58.

Third quarter

- CLE – Gage Larvadain 4-yard run (Dustin Hopkins kick), 3:55. Browns 21–7. Drive: 6 plays, 43 yards, 3:43.

Fourth quarter

- CLE – Dustin Hopkins 23-yard field goal, 13:01. Browns 24–7. Drive: 9 plays, 52 yards, 4:11.
- CLE – Cade McDonald 6-yard pass from Tyler Huntley (kick failed, wide left), 6:03. Browns 30–7. Drive: 10 plays, 59 yards, 4:51.
- CAR – Ryan Fitzgerald 32-yard field goal, 1:57. Browns 30–10. Drive: 9 plays, 60 yards, 4:06.

Passing

- CLE – Shedeur Sanders – 14/23, 138 yards, 2 TD
- CAR – Andy Dalton – 13/19, 101 yards, INT

Rushing

- CLE – Ahmani Marshall – 8 carries, 32 yards
- CAR – Emani Bailey – 3 carries, 21 yards

Receiving

- CLE – Sal Cannella – 3 receptions, 32 yards
- CAR – Tetairoa McMillan – 2 receptions, 43 yards

==== Preseason Week 2: at Philadelphia Eagles ====
Preseason Week 2: Cleveland Browns at Philadelphia Eagles – Game summary

Quarter	1	2	3	4	Total
Browns	6	6	7	3	22
Eagles	0	13	0	0	13

at Lincoln Financial Field, Philadelphia, Pennsylvania

- Date: August 16
- Game time: 1:00 p.m. EDT
- Game weather: Sunny, 84 °F (29 °C)
- Game attendance: 69,879
- Referee: Clete Blakeman
- TV announcers (WEWS): Chris Rose, Joe Thomas and Aditi Kinkhabwala
- Recap, Game Book

Game information

First quarter

- CLE – Ahmani Marshall 4-yard run (pass failed), 6:55. Browns 6–0. Drive: 13 plays, 63 yards, 8:05.

Second quarter

- PHI – Andrew Mukuba 75-yard interception return (Jake Elliott kick), 14:44. Eagles 7–6.
- CLE – Dustin Hopkins 46-yard field goal, 9:13. Browns 9–7. Drive: 10 plays, 49 yards, 5:31.
- PHI – Ainias Smith 9-yard pass from Kyle McCord (run failed), 1:57. Eagles 13–9. Drive: 7 plays, 31 yards, 4:14.
- CLE – Andre Szmyt 49-yard field goal, 0:00. Eagles 13–12. Drive: 6 plays, 31 yards, 1:57.

Third quarter

- CLE – KJ Henry 45-yard interception return (Andre Szmyt kick), 10:59. Browns 19–13.

Fourth quarter

- CLE – Andre Szmyt 33-yard field goal, 6:59. Browns 22–13. Drive: 7 plays, 33 yards, 2:52.

Passing

- CLE – Dillon Gabriel – 13/18, 143 yards, INT
- PHI – Kyle McCord – 8/16, 47 yards, TD

Rushing

- CLE – Pierre Strong Jr. – 13 carries, 89 yards
- PHI – Montrell Johnson Jr. – 6 carries, 20 yards

Receiving

- CLE – Kaden Davis – 3 receptions, 44 yards
- PHI – Ainias Smith – 2 receptions, 19 yards, TD

==== Preseason Week 3: vs. Los Angeles Rams ====
Preseason Week 3: Los Angeles Rams at Cleveland Browns – Game summary

Quarter	1	2	3	4	Total
Rams	0	7	3	7	17
Browns	7	9	0	3	19

at Huntington Bank Field, Cleveland, Ohio

- Date: August 23
- Game time: 1:00 p.m. EDT
- Game weather: Cloudy, 76 °F (24 °C)
- Game attendance: 69,035
- Referee: Brad Allen
- TV announcers (WEWS): Chris Rose, Joe Thomas and Aditi Kinkhabwala
- Recap, Game Book

Game information

First quarter

- CLE – Harold Fannin Jr. 15-yard pass from Joe Flacco (Dustin Hopkins kick), 6:29. Browns 7–0. Drive: 7 plays, 44 yards, 3:44.

Second quarter

- CLE – Dustin Hopkins 28-yard field goal, 4:18. Browns 10–0. Drive: 15 plays, 70 yards, 6:25.
- LAR – Drake Stoops 1-yard pass from Dresser Winn (Joshua Karty kick), 1:55. Browns 10–7. Drive: 6 plays, 67 yards, 2:23.
- CLE – Gage Larvadain 3-yard pass from Dillon Gabriel (kick failed, wide left), 0:17. Browns 16–7. Drive: 11 plays, 86 yards, 1:38.

Third quarter

- LAR – Joshua Karty 45-yard field goal, 2:20. Browns 16–10. Drive: 11 plays, 48 yards, 5:09.

Fourth quarter

- LAR – Jordan Waters 2-yard run (Joshua Karty kick), 2:03. Rams 17–16. Drive: 9 plays, 77 yards, 4:04.
- CLE – Andre Szmyt 37-yard field goal, 0:00. Browns 19–17. Drive: 6 plays, 46 yards, 2:03.

Passing

- LAR – Dresser Winn – 15/23, 190 yards, TD
- CLE – Dillon Gabriel – 12/19, 129 yards, TD

Rushing

- LAR – Jordan Waters – 6 carries, 42 yards, TD
- CLE – Ahmani Marshall – 10 carries, 31 yards

Receiving

- LAR – Brennan Presley – 3 receptions, 51 yards
- CLE – Jamari Thrash – 3 receptions, 42 yards

== Regular season ==
=== Schedule ===
Week	Date	Opponent	Result	Record	Venue	Recap
1	September 7	**Cincinnati Bengals**	**L** 16–17	0–1	Huntington Bank Field	Recap
2	September 14	at **Baltimore Ravens**	**L** 17–41	0–2	M&T Bank Stadium	Recap
3	September 21	Green Bay Packers	**W** 13–10	1–2	Huntington Bank Field	Recap
4	September 28	at Detroit Lions	**L** 10–34	1–3	Ford Field	Recap
5	October 5	Minnesota Vikings	**L** 17–21	1–4	(United Kingdom) Tottenham Hotspur Stadium (London)	Recap
6	October 12	at **Pittsburgh Steelers**	**L** 9–23	1–5	Acrisure Stadium	Recap
7	October 19	Miami Dolphins	**W** 31–6	2–5	Huntington Bank Field	Recap
8	October 26	at New England Patriots	**L** 13–32	2–6	Gillette Stadium	Recap
9	Bye					
10	November 9	at New York Jets	**L** 20–27	2–7	MetLife Stadium	Recap
11	November 16	**Baltimore Ravens**	**L** 16–23	2–8	Huntington Bank Field	Recap
12	November 23	at Las Vegas Raiders	**W** 24–10	3–8	Allegiant Stadium	Recap
13	November 30	San Francisco 49ers	**L** 8–26	3–9	Huntington Bank Field	Recap
14	December 7	Tennessee Titans	**L** 29–31	3–10	Huntington Bank Field	Recap
15	December 14	at Chicago Bears	**L** 3–31	3–11	Soldier Field	Recap
16	December 21	Buffalo Bills	**L** 20–23	3–12	Huntington Bank Field	Recap
17	December 28	**Pittsburgh Steelers**	**W** 13–6	4–12	Huntington Bank Field	Recap
18	January 4	at **Cincinnati Bengals**	**W** 20–18	5–12	Paycor Stadium	Recap

Note: Intra-division opponents are in bold text.

=== Game summaries ===
==== Week 1: vs. Cincinnati Bengals ====
Week 1: Cincinnati Bengals at Cleveland Browns – Game summary

Quarter	1	2	3	4	Total
**Bengals**	7	7	3	0	**17**
Browns	0	10	6	0	**16**

at Huntington Bank Field, Cleveland, Ohio

- Date: September 7
- Game time: 1:00 p.m. EDT
- Game weather: Sunny, 63 °F (17 °C)
- Game attendance: 65,599
- Referee: Adrian Hill
- TV announcers (Fox): Kevin Kugler, Daryl Johnston and Allison Williams
- Recap, Game Book

Game information

**First quarter**

- CIN – Chase Brown 5-yard run (Evan McPherson kick), 7:32. Bengals 7–0. **Drive: 12 plays, 68 yards, 7:28.**

**Second quarter**

- CLE – Raheim Sanders 1-yard run (Andre Szmyt kick), 12:42. Tied 7–7. **Drive: 16 plays, 67 yards, 9:50.**
- CIN – Noah Fant 1-yard pass from Joe Burrow (Evan McPherson kick), 4:18. Bengals 14–7. **Drive: 8 plays, 54 yards, 4:13.**
- CLE – Andre Szmyt 45-yard field goal, 0:23. Bengals 14–10. **Drive: 11 plays, 51 yards, 3:55.**

**Third quarter**

- CLE – Cedric Tillman 5-yard pass from Joe Flacco (kick failed), 7:20. Browns 16–14. **Drive: 13 plays, 69 yards, 7:40.**
- CIN – Evan McPherson 35-yard field goal, 2:48. Bengals 17–16. **Drive: 7 plays, 17 yards, 2:05.**

**Fourth quarter**

- No scoring plays.

**Top passers**

- CIN – Joe Burrow – 14/23, 113 yards, TD
- CLE – Joe Flacco – 31/45, 290 yards, TD, 2 INT

**Top rushers**

- CIN – Chase Brown – 21 rushes, 43 yards, TD
- CLE – Dylan Sampson – 12 rushes, 29 yards

**Top receivers**

- CIN – Tee Higgins – 3 receptions, 33 yards
- CLE – Jerry Jeudy – 5 receptions, 66 yards

Despite holding the Bengals to 2 net yards in the second half, the Browns lost the game and started the season at 0–1.

==== Week 2: at Baltimore Ravens ====
Week 2: Cleveland Browns at Baltimore Ravens – Game summary

Quarter	1	2	3	4	Total
Browns	0	3	7	7	**17**
**Ravens**	3	7	10	21	**41**

at M&T Bank Stadium, Baltimore, Maryland

- Date: September 14
- Game time: 1:00 p.m. EDT
- Game weather: Clear, 82 °F (28 °C)
- Game attendance: 70,487
- Referee: Brad Allen
- TV announcers (CBS): Tom McCarthy, Ross Tucker and Amanda Balionis
- Recap, Game Book

Game information

**First quarter**

- BAL – Tyler Loop 43-yard field goal, 3:06. Ravens 3–0. **Drive: 8 plays, 24 yards, 3:39.**

**Second quarter**

- BAL – Tylan Wallace 15-yard pass from Lamar Jackson (Tyler Loop kick), 11:13. Ravens 10–0. **Drive: 2 plays, 24 yards, 0:53.**
- CLE – Andre Szmyt 38-yard field goal, 0:29. Ravens 10–3. **Drive: 7 plays, 28 yards, 1:24.**

**Third quarter**

- BAL – Tyler Loop 32-yard field goal, 12:26. Ravens 13–3. **Drive: 7 plays, 51 yards, 2:34.**
- BAL – Devontez Walker 2-yard pass from Lamar Jackson (Tyler Loop kick), 10:09. Ravens 20–3. **Drive: 4 plays, 5 yards, 1:20.**
- CLE – Cedric Tillman 18-yard pass from Joe Flacco (Andre Szmyt kick), 5:02. Ravens 20–10. **Drive: 11 plays, 71 yards, 5:07.**

**Fourth quarter**

- BAL – Devontez Walker 24-yard pass from Lamar Jackson (Tyler Loop kick), 13:26. Ravens 27–10. **Drive: 10 plays, 66 yards, 6:36.**
- BAL – Roquan Smith 64-yard fumble return (Tyler Loop kick), 8:18. Ravens 34–10.
- BAL – DeAndre Hopkins 23-yard pass from Lamar Jackson (Tyler Loop kick), 4:43. Ravens 41–10. **Drive: 3 plays, 36 yards, 1:34.**
- CLE – Dylan Sampson 8-yard pass from Dillon Gabriel (Andre Szmyt kick), 1:50. Ravens 41–17. **Drive: 7 plays, 65 yards, 2:53.**

**Top passers**

- CLE – Joe Flacco – 25/45, 199 yards, TD, INT
- BAL – Lamar Jackson – 19/29, 225 yards, 4 TD

**Top rushers**

- CLE – Quinshon Judkins – 10 rushes, 61 yards
- BAL – Derrick Henry – 11 rushes, 24 yards

**Top receivers**

- CLE – Jerry Jeudy – 4 receptions, 51 yards
- BAL – Zay Flowers – 7 receptions, 75 yards

The Browns traveled to Baltimore for a battle with the division rival Baltimore Ravens. This also marked the return to Baltimore for Browns quarterback Joe Flacco, who spent eleven seasons with the Ravens. Baltimore took a 10–0 lead with a Tyler Loop field goal and a Lamar Jackson touchdown pass to Tylan Wallace. The Browns cut the lead to 10–3 late in the first half on an Andre Smyzt field goal.

Baltimore scored the first ten points in the third quarter on another Loop field goal and a Jackson touchdown pass to Devontez Walker to extend their lead to 20–3. The Browns made it 20–10 on a Flacco touchdown pass to Cedric Tillman. The Ravens scored three touchdowns in the fourth quarter to take control of the game with a 41–10 lead. The Browns scored on late touchdown pass from Dillon Gabriel to Dylan Sampson – the first career touchdown for each player – to make the final score 41–17.

With the loss, the Browns fell to 0–2.

==== Week 3: vs. Green Bay Packers ====
Week 3: Green Bay Packers at Cleveland Browns – Game summary

Quarter	1	2	3	4	Total
Packers	0	3	7	0	**10**
**Browns**	0	0	0	13	**13**

at Huntington Bank Field, Cleveland, Ohio

- Date: September 21
- Game time: 1:00 p.m. EDT
- Game weather: Cloudy, 79 °F (26 °C)
- Game attendance: 65,470
- Referee: Carl Cheffers
- TV announcers (Fox): Kevin Kugler, Daryl Johnston and Allison Williams
- Recap, Game Book

Game information

**First quarter**

- No scoring plays

**Second quarter**

- GB – Brandon McManus 39-yard field goal, 14:53. Packers 3–0. **Drive: 13 plays, 43 yards, 7:23.**

**Third quarter**

- GB – John FitzPatrick 3-yard pass from Jordan Love (Brandon McManus kick), 3:23. Packers 10–0. **Drive: 14 plays, 71 yards, 7:41.**

**Fourth quarter**

- CLE – Andre Szmyt 35-yard field goal, 3:38. Packers 10–3. **Drive: 12 plays, 63 yards, 5:48.**
- CLE – Quinshon Judkins 1-yard run (Andre Szmyt kick), 3:01. Tied 10–10. **Drive: 1 play, 4 yards, 0:07.**
- CLE – Andre Szmyt 55-yard field goal, 0:00. Browns 13–10. **Drive: 5 plays, 16 yards, 0:21.**

**Top passers**

- GB – Jordan Love – 18/25, 183 yards, TD, INT
- CLE – Joe Flacco – 21/36, 142 yards, INT

**Top rushers**

- GB – Josh Jacobs – 16 rushes, 30 yards
- CLE – Quinshon Judkins – 18 rushes, 94 yards, TD

**Top receivers**

- GB – Matthew Golden – 4 receptions, 52 yards
- CLE – David Njoku – 5 receptions, 40 yards

The Browns returned home still in search of their first win, to take on the Green Bay Packers. Defense reigned on both sides throughout the first half as the only points were on a Brandon McManus field goal for Green Bay, who took a 3–0 lead into halftime. Green Bay added a Jordan Love touchdown pass to John FitzPatrick in the third quarter to extend its lead to 10–0.

Cleveland scored its first points of the game with under four minutes remaining on an Andre Szmyt field goal. Green Bay's next drive ended quickly when Grant Delpit intercepted a Love pass and returned it to the Green Bay 4-yard line. Two plays later, Quinshon Judkins scored on a 1-yard touchdown run to tie the game at 10–10. Green Bay lined up for a go-ahead field goal with 27 seconds remaining, but McManus' kick was blocked by Shelby Harris. Cleveland promptly drove into field goal range, and Szmyt converted a 55-yard field goal as time expired to give the Browns a 13–10 win.

With the win, the Browns improved to 1–2 and ended an 8–game losing streak which started in Week 13 of the previous season. Szmyt was named AFC Special Teams player of the week.

==== Week 4: at Detroit Lions ====
Week 4: Cleveland Browns at Detroit Lions – Game summary

Quarter	1	2	3	4	Total
Browns	7	0	3	0	**10**
**Lions**	7	13	0	14	**34**

at Ford Field, Detroit, Michigan

- Date: September 28
- Game time: 1:00 p.m. EDT
- Game weather: None (indoor stadium)
- Game attendance: 64,494
- Referee: Shawn Smith
- TV announcers (Fox): Kenny Albert, Jonathan Vilma and Megan Olivi
- Recap, Game Book

Game information

**First quarter**

- CLE – Quinshon Judkins 1-yard run (Andre Szmyt kick), 5:36. Browns 7–0. **Drive: 13 plays, 88 yards, 7:10.**
- DET – Jahmyr Gibbs 8-yard run (Jake Bates kick), 3:20. Tied 7–7. **Drive: 5 plays, 65 yards, 2:16.**

**Second quarter**

- DET – Jake Bates 48-yard field goal, 14:17. Lions 10–7. **Drive: 5 plays, 16 yards, 2:32.**
- DET – Amon-Ra St. Brown 2-yard pass from Jared Goff (Jake Bates kick), 3:00. Lions 17–7. **Drive: 3 plays, 5 yards, 1:26.**
- DET – Jake Bates 58-yard field goal, 0:08. Lions 20–7. **Drive: 6 plays, 44 yards, 0:47.**

**Third quarter**

- CLE – Andre Szmyt 33-yard field goal, 6:44. Lions 20–10. **Drive: 8 plays, 27 yards, 3:32.**

**Fourth quarter**

- DET – Kalif Raymond 65-yard punt return (Jake Bates kick), 13:40. Lions 27–10.
- DET – Amon-Ra St. Brown 8-yard pass from Jared Goff (Jake Bates kick), 4:04. Lions 34–10. **Drive: 6 plays, 20 yards, 2:58.**

**Top passers**

- CLE – Joe Flacco – 16/34, 184 yards, 2 INT
- DET – Jared Goff – 16/27, 168 yards, 2 TD, INT

**Top rushers**

- CLE – Quinshon Judkins – 21 rushes, 82 yards, TD
- DET – Jahmyr Gibbs – 15 rushes, 91 yards, TD

**Top receivers**

- CLE – Isaiah Bond – 3 receptions, 58 yards
- DET – Amon-Ra St. Brown – 7 receptions, 70 yards, 2 TD

The Browns traveled to Detroit hoping to build upon their first win of the season. The Browns struck first on a Quinshon Judkins touchdown run to take a 7–0 lead, but Detroit tied the game on their next drive on a Jahmyr Gibbs touchdown run. Detroit dominated the game from that point, taking advantage of three turnovers by Joe Flacco and returning a punt for a touchdown, en route to the dominating 34–10 win. This was the Browns' final game with Joe Flacco as the team's starting quarterback; he left to go to the Bengals.

With the loss, the Browns fell to 1–3.

==== Week 5: vs. Minnesota Vikings ====
NFL London games

Week 5: Minnesota Vikings at Cleveland Browns – Game summary

Quarter	1	2	3	4	Total
**Vikings**	7	0	7	7	**21**
Browns	7	3	7	0	**17**

at Tottenham Hotspur Stadium, London, United Kingdom

- Date: October 5
- Game time: 2:30 p.m. BST/9:30 a.m. EDT
- Game weather: Cloudy, 61 °F (16 °C)
- Game attendance: 61,082
- Referee: Scott Novak
- TV announcers (WEWS/NFLN): Kenny Albert, Jonathan Vilma and Sara Walsh
- Recap, Game Book

Game information

**First quarter**

- CLE – Harold Fannin Jr. 1-yard pass from Dillon Gabriel (Andre Szmyt kick), 6:49. Browns 7–0. **Drive: 7 plays, 47 yards, 3:28.**
- MIN – Josh Oliver 32-yard pass from Cam Akers (Will Reichard kick), 2:30. Tied 7–7. **Drive: 8 plays, 82 yards, 4:19.**

**Second quarter**

- CLE – Andre Szmyt 31-yard field goal, 0:09. Browns 10–7. **Drive: 14 plays, 53 yards, 2:21.**

**Third quarter**

- MIN – Jordan Mason 3-yard run (Will Reichard kick), 11:11. Vikings 14–10. **Drive: 8 plays, 71 yards, 3:49.**
- CLE – David Njoku 9-yard pass from Dillon Gabriel (Andre Szmyt kick), 3:05. Browns 17–14. **Drive: 13 plays, 69 yards, 8:06.**

**Fourth quarter**

- MIN – Jordan Addison 12-yard pass from Carson Wentz (Will Reichard kick), 0:25. Vikings 21–17. **Drive: 10 plays, 80 yards, 2:40.**

**Top passers**

- MIN – Carson Wentz – 25/34, 236 yards, TD
- CLE – Dillon Gabriel – 19/33, 190 yards, 2 TD

**Top rushers**

- MIN – Jordan Mason – 13 rushes, 52 yards, TD
- CLE – Quinshon Judkins – 23 rushes, 110 yards

**Top receivers**

- MIN – Justin Jefferson – 7 receptions, 123 yards
- CLE – David Njoku – 6 receptions, 67 yards, TD

The Browns traveled to London to face the Minnesota Vikings as part of the NFL International Series. Heading into the matchup, starting quarterback Joe Flacco was benched and second-string quarterback Dillon Gabriel was named the starter, the team’s 41st starting quarterback since 1999. Gabriel passed for 190 yards and two touchdowns to give the Browns a 17–14 lead late in the fourth quarter.

The Browns gained possession with 3:21 remaining in the game, but were unable to move the ball being forced to punt and only taking 16 seconds off the clock. Minnesota drove 80 yards in the final minutes, with quarterback Carson Wentz completing all 9 of his passes including the game-winning touchdown to Jordan Addison with 25 seconds remaining to make the final score 21–17.

With the loss, Browns fell to 1–4. Going back to last season, this was the tenth straight game in which the Browns scored 17 or fewer points, tying a franchise record previously set in 1975. The Browns also became the first team since the 2000–2001 Arizona Cardinals to have such a streak.

Following the game, the Browns traded Flacco to the Cincinnati Bengals.

==== Week 6: at Pittsburgh Steelers ====
Week 6: Cleveland Browns at Pittsburgh Steelers – Game summary

Quarter	1	2	3	4	Total
Browns	0	3	3	3	**9**
**Steelers**	3	6	7	7	**23**

at Acrisure Stadium, Pittsburgh, Pennsylvania

- Date: October 12
- Game time: 1:00 p.m. EDT
- Game weather: Cloudy, 64 °F (18 °C)
- Game attendance: 66,738
- Referee: Ron Torbert
- TV announcers (CBS): Ian Eagle, J. J. Watt and Evan Washburn
- Recap, Game Book

Game information

**First quarter**

- PIT – Chris Boswell 44-yard field goal, 10:55. Steelers 3–0. **Drive: 8 plays, 46 yards, 4:05.**

**Second quarter**

- PIT – Chris Boswell 50-yard field goal, 11:01. Steelers 6–0. **Drive: 11 plays, 39 yards, 4:05.**
- PIT – Chris Boswell 48-yard field goal, 3:38. Steelers 9–0. **Drive: 10 plays, 49 yards, 5:19.**
- CLE – Andre Szmyt 31-yard field goal, 0:00. Steelers 9–3. **Drive: 16 plays, 72 yards, 3:38.**

**Third quarter**

- PIT – Connor Heyward 12-yard pass from Aaron Rodgers (Chris Boswell kick), 7:46. Steelers 16–3. **Drive: 10 plays, 79 yards, 6:02.**
- CLE – Andre Szmyt 53-yard field goal, 4:08. Steelers 16–6. **Drive: 9 plays, 34 yards, 3:38.**

**Fourth quarter**

- PIT – DK Metcalf 25-yard pass from Aaron Rodgers (Chris Boswell kick), 14:55. Steelers 23–6. **Drive: 7 plays, 73 yards, 4:13.**
- CLE – Andre Szmyt 32-yard field goal, 9:29. Steelers 23–9. **Drive: 18 plays, 54 yards, 5:26.**

**Top passers**

- CLE – Dillon Gabriel – 29/52, 221 yards
- PIT – Aaron Rodgers – 21/30, 235 yards, 2 TD

**Top rushers**

- CLE – Quinshon Judkins – 12 rushes, 36 yards
- PIT – Jaylen Warren – 11 rushes, 52 yards

**Top receivers**

- CLE – Harold Fannin Jr. – 7 receptions, 81 yards
- PIT – DK Metcalf – 4 receptions, 95 yards, TD

The Browns returned stateside for a Week 6 trip to Pittsburgh against the rival Steelers. Defense dominated the first half as neither team found the end zone. Pittsburgh took a 9–0 lead on a trio of Chris Boswell field goals, before Andre Szmyt connected on a field goal of his own to cut the Steelers' lead to 9–3 at halftime.

Pittsburgh scored the game's first touchdown in the middle of the third quarter on an Aaron Rodgers pass to Connor Heyward to take a 16–3 lead. Cleveland responded with a Szmyt field goal to make the score 16–6. The fourth quarter saw another Rodgers touchdown pass, this time to DK Metcalf, and another Szmyt field goal, to make the final score 23–9.

With the loss, the Browns fell to 1–5. It marked the team’s 22nd consecutive regular season loss in Pittsburgh. The Browns also set a franchise record 11th consecutive game scoring 17 or less points, surpassing the previous record set in 1975.

==== Week 7: vs. Miami Dolphins ====
Week 7: Miami Dolphins at Cleveland Browns – Game summary

Quarter	1	2	3	4	Total
Dolphins	0	6	0	0	**6**
**Browns**	3	14	7	7	**31**

at Huntington Bank Field, Cleveland, Ohio

- Date: October 19
- Game time: 1:00 p.m. EDT
- Game weather: Rain, 65 °F (18 °C)
- Game attendance: 63,762
- Referee: Shawn Hochuli
- TV announcers (CBS): Spero Dedes, Adam Archuleta and Aditi Kinkhabwala
- Recap, Game Book

Game information

**First quarter**

- CLE – Andre Szmyt 30-yard field goal, 2:17. Browns 3–0. **Drive: 11 plays, 57 yards, 6:43.**

**Second quarter**

- MIA – Riley Patterson 33-yard field goal, 14:14. Tied 3–3. **Drive: 6 plays, 62 yards, 3:03.**
- CLE – Quinshon Judkins 46-yard run (Andre Szmyt kick), 11:19. Browns 10–3. **Drive: 5 plays, 83 yards, 2:55.**
- CLE – Quinshon Judkins 3-yard run (Andre Szmyt kick), 6:03. Browns 17–3. **Drive: 10 plays, 46 yards, 5:10.**
- MIA – Riley Patterson 26-yard field goal, 0:00. Browns 17–6. **Drive: 9 plays, 32 yards, 2:53.**

**Third quarter**

- CLE – Tyson Campbell 34-yard interception return (Andre Szmyt kick), 14:48. Browns 24–6.

**Fourth quarter**

- CLE – Quinshon Judkins 2-yard run (Andre Szmyt kick), 10:56. Browns 31–6. **Drive: 1 play, 2 yards, 0:03.**

**Top passers**

- MIA – Tua Tagovailoa – 12/23, 100 yards, 3 INT
- CLE – Dillon Gabriel – 13/18, 116 yards

**Top rushers**

- MIA – De'Von Achane – 13 rushes, 82 yards
- CLE – Quinshon Judkins – 25 rushes, 84 yards, 3 TD

**Top receivers**

- MIA – Dee Eskridge – 2 receptions, 45 yards
- CLE – Harold Fannin Jr. – 4 receptions, 36 yards

The Browns returned home on a rainy, windy afternoon to face the Miami Dolphins, hoping to end their losing streak at three games. After both teams kicked field goals early in the game, the Browns took a 10–3 lead on a 46-yard touchdown run by Quinshon Judkins. Miami fumbled the ensuing kickoff, setting up Cleveland with a short field; the Browns scored on another Judkins touchdown run to make it 17–3. A Riley Patterson field goal for Miami made the score 17–6 at halftime.

On the first play of the second half, Tyson Campbell intercepted a Tua Tagovailoa pass and returned it 34 yards for a touchdown, making the score 24–6. Judkins scored his third touchdown of the game in the fourth quarter, set up by a Rayshawn Jenkins interception returned to the Miami 2-yard line, extending the Browns' lead to 31–6, which was the final score.

With the win, the Browns improved to 2–5 and ended their streak of 11 consecutive games scoring 17 or fewer points. Grant Delpit was named AFC Special Teams Player of the week for his forced fumble on a kickoff, which set up a Browns touchdown drive.

==== Week 8: at New England Patriots ====
Week 8: Cleveland Browns at New England Patriots – Game summary

Quarter	1	2	3	4	Total
Browns	7	0	0	6	**13**
**Patriots**	3	6	21	2	**32**

at Gillette Stadium, Foxborough, Massachusetts

- Date: October 26
- Game time: 1:00 p.m. EDT
- Game weather: Sunny, 53 °F (12 °C)
- Game attendance: 64,628
- Referee: Alex Moore
- TV announcers (Fox): Chris Myers, Mark Schlereth and Sarah Kustok
- Recap, Game Book

Game information

**First quarter**

- NE – Andres Borregales 36-yard field goal, 8:45. Patriots 3–0. **Drive: 12 plays, 54 yards, 6:15.**
- CLE – Harold Fannin Jr. 18-yard pass from Dillon Gabriel (Andre Szmyt kick), 5:10. Browns 7–3. **Drive: 6 plays, 70 yards, 3:35.**

**Second quarter**

- NE – Andres Borregales 32-yard field goal, 7:41. Browns 7–6. **Drive: 7 plays, 49 yards, 3:41.**
- NE – Andres Borregales 42-yard field goal, 0:00. Patriots 9–7. **Drive: 7 plays, 59 yards, 2:09.**

**Third quarter**

- NE – Hunter Henry 7-yard pass from Drake Maye (Andres Borregales kick), 9:10. Patriots 16–7. **Drive: 7 plays, 77 yards, 4:03.**
- NE – Stefon Diggs 1-yard pass from Drake Maye (Andres Borregales kick), 6:43. Patriots 23–7. **Drive: 3 plays, 6 yards, 0:48.**
- NE – Kayshon Boutte 39-yard pass from Drake Maye (Andres Borregales kick), 0:53. Patriots 30–7. **Drive: 5 plays, 81 yards, 2:49.**

**Fourth quarter**

- CLE – David Njoku 11-yard pass from Dillon Gabriel (pass failed), 9:24. Patriots 30–13. **Drive: 3 plays, 26 yards, 0:53.**
- NE – Penalty on Dillon Gabriel enforced in the end zone for a safety, 4:06. Patriots 32–13.

**Top passers**

- CLE – Dillon Gabriel – 21/35, 156 yards, 2 TD, 2 INT
- NE – Drake Maye – 18/24, 282 yards, 3 TD, INT

**Top rushers**

- CLE – Malachi Corley – 1 rush, 31 yards
- NE – TreVeyon Henderson – 10 rushes, 75 yards

**Top receivers**

- CLE – Harold Fannin Jr. – 6 receptions, 62 yards, TD
- NE – Mack Hollins – 7 receptions, 89 yards

With the loss, the Browns fell to 2–6. This marked the Browns’ sixth straight loss to the Patriots, dating back to 2013.

Despite the loss, Browns edge rusher Myles Garrett recorded a franchise-record and career-high 5 sacks, surpassing his previous mark of 4.5 sacks set against the Chicago Bears in 2021.

==== Week 10: at New York Jets ====
Week 10: Cleveland Browns at New York Jets – Game summary

Quarter	1	2	3	4	Total
Browns	7	10	0	3	**20**
**Jets**	14	3	0	10	**27**

at MetLife Stadium, East Rutherford, New Jersey

- Date: November 9
- Game time: 1:00 p.m. EST
- Game weather: Cloudy, 62 °F (17 °C)
- Game attendance: 72,623
- Referee: Shawn Smith
- TV announcers (CBS): Spero Dedes, Adam Arculeta and Aditi Kinkhabwala
- Recap, Game Book

Game information

**First quarter**

- CLE – David Njoku 9-yard pass from Dillon Gabriel (Andre Szmyt kick), 6:34. Browns 7–0. **Drive: 9 plays, 95 yards, 5:02.**
- NYJ – Kene Nwangwu 99-yard kickoff return (Nick Folk kick), 6:21. Tied 7–7.
- NYJ – Isaiah Williams 74-yard punt return (Nick Folk kick), 5:45. Jets 14–7.

**Second quarter**

- CLE – Jerry Jeudy 22-yard pass from Dillon Gabriel (Andre Szmyt kick), 10:34. Tied 14–14. **Drive: 1 play, 22 yards, 0:07.**
- NYJ – Nick Folk 26-yard field goal, 3:51. Jets 17–14. **Drive: 11 plays, 64 yards, 6:43.**
- CLE – Andre Szmyt 45-yard field goal, 0:00. Tied 17–17. **Drive: 7 plays, 34 yards, 0:45.**

**Third quarter**

- No scoring plays

**Fourth quarter**

- NYJ – Breece Hall 42-yard pass from Justin Fields (Nick Folk kick), 14:12. Jets 24–17. **Drive: 8 plays, 58 yards, 4:23.**
- NYJ – Nick Folk 37-yard field goal, 6:13. Jets 27–17. **Drive: 6 plays, 41 yards, 4:02.**
- CLE – Andre Szmyt 29-yard field goal, 2:57. Jets 27–20. **Drive: 10 plays, 58 yards, 3:16.**

**Top passers**

- CLE – Dillon Gabriel – 17/32, 167 yards, 2 TD
- NYJ – Justin Fields – 6/11, 54 yards, TD, INT

**Top rushers**

- CLE – Quinshon Judkins – 22 rushes, 75 yards
- NYJ – Breece Hall – 21 rushes, 83 yards

**Top receivers**

- CLE – Jerry Jeudy – 6 receptions, 78 yards, TD
- NYJ – Breece Hall – 1 reception, 42 yards, TD

After the Browns scored a touchdown, Jets' running back Kene Nwangwu returned a kickoff 99 yards for a score. On the very next drive following a Browns punt, Jets' wide receiver Isaiah Williams returned a punt 74 yards for a touchdown. Although the Browns attempted a comeback, a holding penalty and a neutral-zone infraction helped the Jets hold on for the win.

With the loss, the Browns fell to 2–7.

==== Week 11: vs. Baltimore Ravens ====
Week 11: Baltimore Ravens at Cleveland Browns – Game summary

Quarter	1	2	3	4	Total
**Ravens**	3	7	0	13	**23**
Browns	3	13	0	0	**16**

at Huntington Bank Field, Cleveland, Ohio

- Date: November 16
- Game time: 4:25 p.m. EST
- Game weather: Cloudy, 44 °F (7 °C)
- Game attendance: 64,230
- Referee: Land Clark
- TV announcers (CBS): Andrew Catalon, Charles Davis, Jason McCourty and AJ Ross
- Recap, Game Book

Game information

**First quarter**

- BAL – Tyler Loop 25-yard field goal, 4:55. Ravens 3–0. **Drive: 15 plays, 72 yards, 7:41.**
- CLE – Andre Szmyt 30-yard field goal, 0:00. Tied 3–3. **Drive: 9 plays, 55 yards, 4:55.**

**Second quarter**

- CLE – Andre Szmyt 30-yard field goal, 8:44. Browns 6–3. **Drive: 4 plays, 0 yards, 1:32.**
- CLE – Devin Bush Jr. 23-yard interception return (Andre Szmyt kick), 7:43. Browns 13–3.
- BAL – Derrick Henry 1-yard run (Tyler Loop kick), 4:17. Browns 13–10. **Drive: 6 plays, 63 yards, 3:26.**
- CLE – Andre Szmyt 46-yard field goal, 0:58. Browns 16–10. **Drive: 8 plays, 42 yards, 3:19.**

**Third quarter**

- No scoring plays

**Fourth quarter**

- BAL – Tyler Loop 24-yard field goal, 14:06. Browns 16–13. **Drive: 5 plays, 63 yards, 1:56.**
- BAL – Tyler Loop 44-yard field goal, 4:59. Tied 16–16. **Drive: 10 plays, 54 yards, 5:50.**
- BAL – Mark Andrews 35-yard run (Tyler Loop kick), 2:31. Ravens 23–16. **Drive: 4 plays, 44 yards, 2:01.**

**Top passers**

- BAL – Lamar Jackson – 14/25, 193 yards, 2 INT
- CLE – Dillon Gabriel – 7/10, 68 yards

**Top rushers**

- BAL – Derrick Henry – 18 rushes, 103 yards, TD
- CLE – Quinshon Judkins – 17 rushes, 59 yards

**Top receivers**

- BAL – Zay Flowers – 3 receptions, 78 yards
- CLE – Cedric Tillman – 3 receptions, 52 yards

Quarterback Shedeur Sanders made his debut with 12:43 remaining in the third quarter after Dillon Gabriel exited with a concussion. However, he struggled, completing only 4-of-16 passes with an interception and finishing with a 13.5 passer rating. Although the Browns kept the game close throughout, Ravens tight end Mark Andrews ran 35 yards on a 4th-and-1 play for the go-ahead touchdown, securing the victory for Baltimore.

With the loss, the Browns fell to 2–8.

==== Week 12: at Las Vegas Raiders ====
Week 12: Cleveland Browns at Las Vegas Raiders – Game summary

Quarter	1	2	3	4	Total
**Browns**	14	0	0	10	**24**
Raiders	0	3	0	7	**10**

at Allegiant Stadium, Paradise, Nevada

- Date: November 23
- Game time: 4:05 p.m. EST/1:05 p.m. PST
- Game weather: None (indoor stadium)
- Game attendance: 62,244
- Referee: Shawn Hochuli
- TV announcers (CBS): Tom McCarthy, Ross Tucker and Tiffany Blackmon
- Recap, Game Book

Game information

**First quarter**

- CLE – Quinshon Judkins 8-yard run (Andre Szmyt kick), 8:24. Browns 7–0. **Drive: 2 plays, 13 yards, 0:48.**
- CLE – Quinshon Judkins 2-yard run (Andre Szmyt kick), 0:48. Browns 14–0. **Drive: 5 plays, 73 yards, 2:22.**

**Second quarter**

- LV – Daniel Carlson 41-yard field goal, 9:12. Browns 14–3. **Drive: 4 plays, 3 yards, 2:08.**

**Third quarter**

- No scoring plays

**Fourth quarter**

- CLE – Andre Szmyt 53-yard field goal, 12:08. Browns 17–3. **Drive: 8 plays, 44 yards, 3:45.**
- CLE – Dylan Sampson 66-yard pass from Shedeur Sanders (Andre Szmyt kick), 8:18. Browns 24–3. **Drive: 3 plays, 67 yards, 1:03.**
- LV – Ashton Jeanty 5-yard pass from Geno Smith (Daniel Carlson kick), 5:11. Browns 24–10. **Drive: 7 plays, 65 yards, 3:07.**

**Top passers**

- CLE – Shedeur Sanders – 11/20, 209 yards, TD, INT
- LV – Geno Smith – 30/44, 285 yards, TD

**Top rushers**

- CLE – Quinshon Judkins – 16 rushes, 47 yards, 2 TD
- LV – Ashton Jeanty – 17 rushes, 50 yards

**Top receivers**

- CLE – Dylan Sampson – 2 receptions, 59 yards, TD
- LV – Tyler Lockett – 4 receptions, 62 yards

The Browns named Shedeur Sanders as their starting quarterback.

The Browns' defense sacked Raiders quarterback Geno Smith ten times, while Sanders passed for 209 yards and a touchdown, including a 52-yard completion to Isaiah Bond in the first quarter, ending a 15-game drought without a 50-yard pass by a Cleveland quarterback.

With the win, the Browns improved 3–8. Sanders ended a 17-game losing streak by Cleveland rookie quarterbacks making their first career start. Additionally, the Browns snapped a 13-game road losing streak, which had coincidentally started with loss to the Raiders in the 2024 season.

==== Week 13: vs. San Francisco 49ers ====
Week 13: San Francisco 49ers at Cleveland Browns – Game summary

Quarter	1	2	3	4	Total
**49ers**	7	3	7	9	**26**
Browns	0	8	0	0	**8**

at Huntington Bank Field, Cleveland, Ohio

- Date: November 30
- Game time: 1:00 p.m. EST
- Game weather: Cloudy, 35 °F (2 °C)
- Game attendance: 64,042
- Referee: Brad Allen
- TV announcers (CBS): Kevin Harlan, Trent Green and Melanie Collins
- Recap, Game Book

Game information

**First quarter**

- SF – Christian McCaffrey 1-yard run (Matt Gay kick), 8:12. 49ers 7–0. **Drive: 6 plays, 16 yards, 2:10.**

**Second quarter**

- CLE – Harold Fannin Jr. 34-yard pass from Shedeur Sanders (Quinshon Judkins run), 0:39. Browns 8–7. **Drive: 10 plays, 90 yards, 5:42.**
- SF – Matt Gay 25-yard field goal, 0:00. 49ers 10–8. **Drive: 6 plays, 58 yards, 0:39.**

**Third quarter**

- SF – Brock Purdy 2-yard run (Matt Gay kick), 1:29. 49ers 17–8. **Drive: 9 plays, 32 yards, 5:36.**

**Fourth quarter**

- SF – Jauan Jennings 7-yard pass from Brock Purdy (pass failed), 11:05. 49ers 23–8. **Drive: 6 plays, 18 yards, 2:22.**
- SF – Matt Gay 31-yard field goal, 4:09. 49ers 26–8. **Drive: 9 plays, 29 yards, 3:15.**

**Top passers**

- SF – Brock Purdy – 16/29, 168 yards, TD
- CLE – Shedeur Sanders – 16/25, 149 yards, TD

**Top rushers**

- SF – Christian McCaffrey – 20 rushes, 53 yards, TD
- CLE – Quinshon Judkins – 23 rushes, 91 yards

**Top receivers**

- SF – George Kittle – 4 receptions, 67 yards
- CLE – Harold Fannin Jr. – 3 receptions, 43 yards, TD

With the loss, the Browns fell to 3–9 and they secured their 16th losing season in 18 years.

==== Week 14: vs. Tennessee Titans ====
Week 14: Tennessee Titans at Cleveland Browns – Game summary

Quarter	1	2	3	4	Total
**Titans**	14	0	7	10	**31**
Browns	3	14	0	12	**29**

at Huntington Bank Field, Cleveland, Ohio

- Date: December 7
- Game time: 1:00 p.m. EST
- Game weather: Cloudy, 33 °F (1 °C)
- Game attendance: 62,982
- Referee: Carl Cheffers
- TV announcers (Fox): Chris Myers, Mark Schlereth and Jen Hale
- Recap, Game Book

Game information

**First quarter**

- TEN – Elic Ayomanor 5-yard pass from Cam Ward (Joey Slye kick), 9:52. Titans 7–0. **Drive: 8 plays, 53 yards, 5:08.**
- CLE – Andre Szmyt 38-yard field goal, 1:42. Titans 7–3. **Drive: 5 plays, 19 yards, 2:03.**
- TEN – Tony Pollard 65-yard run (Joey Slye kick), 1:29. 'Titans 14–3. **Drive: 1 play, 65 yards, 0:13.**

**Second quarter**

- CLE – David Njoku 1-yard pass from Shedeur Sanders (Andre Szmyt kick), 14:24. Titans 14–10. **Drive: 4 plays, 60 yards, 2:05.**
- CLE – Jerry Jeudy 60-yard pass from Shedeur Sanders (Andre Szmyt kick), 2:47. Browns 17–14. **Drive: 3 plays, 74 yards, 0:55.**

**Third quarter**

- TEN – Tony Pollard 32-yard run (Joey Slye kick), 0:51. Titans 21–17. **Drive: 2 plays, 38 yards, 0:50.**

**Fourth quarter**

- TEN – Chimere Dike 5-yard pass from Cam Ward (Joey Slye kick), 9:29. Titans 28–17. **Drive: 3 plays, 8 yards, 1:25.**
- TEN – Joey Slye 41-yard field goal, 6:17. Titans 31–17. **Drive: 4 plays, 6 yards, 2:07.**
- CLE – Shedeur Sanders 7-yard run (run failed), 4:27. Titans 31–23. **Drive: 5 plays, 66 yards, 1:50.**
- CLE – Harold Fannin Jr. 7-yard pass from Shedeur Sanders (pass failed), 1:03. Titans 31–29. **Drive: 7 plays, 80 yards, 1:40.**

**Top passers**

- TEN – Cam Ward – 14/28, 117 yards, 2 TD, INT
- CLE – Shedeur Sanders – 23/42, 364 yards, 3 TD, INT

**Top rushers**

- TEN – Tony Pollard – 25 rushes, 161 yards, 2 TD
- CLE – Shedeur Sanders – 3 rushes, 29 yards, TD

**Top receivers**

- TEN – Tyjae Spears – 2 receptions, 28 yards
- CLE – Harold Fannin Jr. – 8 receptions, 114 yards, TD

With the loss, the Browns fell to 3–10 and they were eliminated from playoff contention for the 16th time in 18 years.

==== Week 15: at Chicago Bears ====
Week 15: Cleveland Browns at Chicago Bears – Game summary

Quarter	1	2	3	4	Total
Browns	0	0	3	0	**3**
**Bears**	14	0	14	3	**31**

at Soldier Field, Chicago, Illinois

- Date: December 14
- Game time: 1:00 p.m. EST/12:00 p.m. CST
- Game weather: Sunny, 8 °F (−13 °C)
- Game attendance: 54,051
- Referee: Ron Torbert
- TV announcers (Fox): Kevin Kugler, Daryl Johnston and Allison Williams
- Recap, Game Book

Game information

**First quarter**

- CHI – D'Andre Swift 6-yard run (Cairo Santos kick), 7:35. Bears 7–0. **Drive: 6 plays, 42 yards, 3:43.**
- CHI – D. J. Moore 3-yard pass from Caleb Williams (Cairo Santos kick), 1:29. Bears 14–0. **Drive: 7 plays, 80 yards, 4:25.**

**Second quarter**

- No scoring plays

**Third quarter**

- CLE – Andre Szmyt 50-yard field goal, 10:03. Bears 14–3. **Drive: 6 plays, 16 yards, 2:10.**
- CHI – D. J. Moore 22-yard pass from Caleb Williams (Cairo Santos kick), 8:39. Bears 21–3. **Drive: 1 play, 22 yards, 0:07.**
- CHI – D'Andre Swift 17-yard run (Cairo Santos kick), 0:46. Bears 28–3. **Drive: 9 plays, 80 yards, 5:01.**

**Fourth quarter**

- CHI – Cairo Santos 41-yard field goal, 7:30. Bears 31–3. **Drive: 4 plays, -1 yard, 1:25.**

**Top passers**

- CLE – Shedeur Sanders – 18/35, 177 yards, 3 INT
- CHI – Caleb Williams – 17/28, 242 yards, 2 TD

**Top rushers**

- CLE – Shedeur Sanders – 2 rushes, 24 yards
- CHI – D'Andre Swift – 18 rushes, 98 yards, 2 TD

**Top receivers**

- CLE – Isaiah Bond – 2 receptions, 89 yards
- CHI – Luther Burden III – 6 receptions, 84 yards

With the loss, the Browns fell to 3–11.

==== Week 16: vs. Buffalo Bills ====
Week 16: Buffalo Bills at Cleveland Browns – Game summary

Quarter	1	2	3	4	Total
**Bills**	7	13	3	0	**23**
Browns	7	3	7	3	**20**

at Huntington Bank Field, Cleveland, Ohio

- Date: December 21
- Game time: 1:00 p.m. EST
- Game weather: Sunny, 25 °F (−4 °C)
- Game attendance: 67,580
- Referee: Bill Vinovich
- TV announcers (CBS): Ian Eagle, J. J. Watt and Evan Washburn
- Recap, Game Book

Game information

**First quarter**

- CLE – Harold Fannin Jr. 13-yard pass from Shedeur Sanders (Andre Szmyt kick), 10:42. Browns 7–0. **Drive: 8 plays, 69 yards, 4:18.**
- BUF – James Cook 44-yard run (Michael Badgley kick), 7:47. Tied 7–7. **Drive: 5 plays, 80 yards, 2:55.**

**Second quarter**

- BUF – Ty Johnson 2-yard run (kick failed), 12:54. Bills 13–7. **Drive: 9 plays, 61 yards, 5:01.**
- CLE – Andre Szmyt 24-yard field goal, 5:38. Bills 13–10. **Drive: 13 plays, 65 yards, 7:16.**
- BUF – James Cook 3-yard run (Michael Badgley kick), 2:23. Bills 20–10. **Drive: 7 plays, 68 yards, 3:15.**

**Third quarter**

- BUF – Michael Badgley 41-yard field goal, 9:37. Bills 23–10. **Drive: 4 plays, 2 yards, 1:02.**
- CLE – Harold Fannin Jr. 1-yard run (Andre Szmyt kick), 1:36. Bills 23–17. **Drive: 14 plays, 67 yards, 8:01.**

**Fourth quarter**

- CLE – Andre Szymt 41-yard field goal, 8:46. Bills 23–20. **Drive: 8 plays, 43 yards, 4:44.**

**Top passers**

- BUF – Josh Allen – 12/19, 130 yards
- CLE – Shedeur Sanders – 20/29, 157 yards, TD, 2 INT

**Top rushers**

- BUF – James Cook – 16 rushes, 117 yards, 2 TD
- CLE – Shedeur Sanders – 4 rushes, 49 yards

**Top receivers**

- BUF – Khalil Shakir – 4 receptions, 34 yards
- CLE – Trayveon Williams – 4 receptions, 38 yards

With the loss, the Browns fell to 3–12.

Two days later, the Browns announced that running back Quinshon Judkins suffered a dislocated right ankle and a broken fibula late in the second quarter and would miss the remainder of the season.

==== Week 17: vs. Pittsburgh Steelers ====
Week 17: Pittsburgh Steelers at Cleveland Browns – Game summary

Quarter	1	2	3	4	Total
Steelers	0	6	0	0	**6**
**Browns**	10	0	0	3	**13**

at Huntington Bank Field, Cleveland, Ohio

- Date: December 28
- Game time: 1:00 p.m. EST
- Game weather: Rain, 45 °F (7 °C)
- Game attendance: 67,194
- Referee: John Hussey
- TV announcers (CBS): Jim Nantz, Tony Romo and Tracy Wolfson
- Recap, Game Book

Game information

**First quarter**

- CLE – Andre Szmyt 50-yard field goal, 10:48. Browns 3–0. **Drive: 9 plays, 41 yards, 4:12.**
- CLE – Harold Fannin Jr. 28-yard pass from Shedeur Sanders (Andre Szmyt kick), 5:11. Browns 10–0. **Drive: 6 plays, 86 yards, 3:21.**

**Second quarter**

- PIT – Chris Boswell 44-yard field goal, 14:54. Browns 10–3. **Drive: 10 plays, 55 yards, 5:17.**
- PIT – Chris Boswell 40-yard field goal, 0:00. Browns 10–6. **Drive: 10 plays, 56 yards, 1:51.**

**Third quarter**

- No scoring plays

**Fourth quarter**

- CLE – Andre Szmyt 33-yard field goal, 1:40. Browns 13–6. **Drive: 4 plays, 5 yards, 0:18.**

**Top passers**

- PIT – Aaron Rodgers – 21/39, 168 yards
- CLE – Shedeur Sanders – 17/23, 186 yards, TD, 2 INT

**Top rushers**

- PIT – Jaylen Warren – 12 rushes, 64 yards
- CLE – Dylan Sampson – 11 rushes, 27 yards

**Top receivers**

- PIT – Pat Freiermuth – 3 receptions, 63 yards
- CLE – Jerry Jeudy – 5 receptions, 54 yards

With the win, the Browns improved to 4–12. They finished 3–6 at home.

==== Week 18: at Cincinnati Bengals ====
Week 18: Cleveland Browns at Cincinnati Bengals – Game summary

Quarter	1	2	3	4	Total
**Browns**	7	7	3	3	**20**
Bengals	6	6	0	6	**18**

at Paycor Stadium, Cincinnati, Ohio

- Date: January 4
- Game time: 1:00 p.m. EST
- Game weather: Sunny, 37 °F (3 °C)
- Game attendance: 62,230
- Referee: Alex Kemp
- TV announcers (CBS): Tom McCarthy, Logan Ryan and Amanda Balionis
- Recap, Game Book

Game information

**First quarter**

- CIN – Chase Brown 4-yard pass from Joe Burrow (kick blocked), 7:59. Bengals 6–0. **Drive: 4 plays, 29 yards, 2:23.**
- CLE – Devin Bush Jr. 97-yard interception return (Andre Szmyt kick), 0:56. Browns 7–6.

**Second quarter**

- CLE – Sam Webb 47-yard fumble recovery (Andre Szmyt kick), 14:06. Browns 14–6. **Drive: 4 plays, 16 yards, 1:50.**
- CIN – Tee Higgins 13-yard pass from Joe Burrow (kick failed), 0:29. Browns 14–12. **Drive: 9 plays, 79 yards, 4:12.**

**Third quarter**

- CLE – Andre Szmyt 27-yard field goal, 8:00. Browns 17–12. **Drive: 12 plays, 56 yards, 7:00.**

**Fourth quarter**

- CIN – Ja'Marr Chase 4-yard pass from Joe Burrow (pass failed), 1:29. Bengals 18–17. **Drive: 7 plays, 61 yards, 1:12.**
- CLE – Andre Szmyt 49-yard field goal, 0:00. Browns 20–18. **Drive: 10 plays, 40 yards, 1:29.**

**Top passers**

- CLE – Shedeur Sanders – 11/22, 111 yards
- CIN – Joe Burrow – 29/39, 236 yards, 3 TD, INT

**Top rushers**

- CLE – Dylan Sampson – 10 rushes, 32 yards
- CIN – Chase Brown – 13 rushes, 72 yards

**Top receivers**

- CLE – Cedric Tillman – 1 reception, 23 yards
- CIN – Ja'Marr Chase – 8 receptions, 96 yards, TD

Although the Browns entered as 9.5-point underdogs, Cleveland jumped out to a 14–6 lead following early mistakes by Bengals quarterback Joe Burrow. Burrow threw a 97-yard pick-six to Devin Bush Jr., then on the next drive, he was sacked and fumbled, resulting in a 47-yard fumble return touchdown by Sam Webb. Although the Bengals rallied to take an 18–17 lead with 1:29 remaining, Shedeur Sanders led a late drive that set up Andrew Szmyt for a 49-yard game-winning field goal. Szmyt, who had missed an extra point and a field goal in Cleveland’s 17–16 loss to Cincinnati in Week 1, converted the kick to win the game as time expired. With the win, the Browns finished the season at 5–12 and 2–6 in away games.

Late in the fourth quarter, Myles Garrett sacked Joe Burrow for his 23rd sack of the season, setting the NFL single-season record and breaking the previous mark of 22.5 set by Michael Strahan in 2001 and T. J. Watt in 2021.

The following day, the Browns announced the firing of head coach Kevin Stefanski. Stefanski compiled a 45–56 record over six seasons with Cleveland, leading the team to two playoff appearances and one playoff victory, while also winning NFL Coach of the Year twice.

=== Standings ===
==== Division ====
AFC North
	W	L	T	PCT	DIV	CONF	PF	PA	STK
^{(4)} Pittsburgh Steelers	10	7	0	.588	4–2	8–4	397	387	W1
Baltimore Ravens	8	9	0	.471	3–3	5–7	424	398	L1
Cincinnati Bengals	6	11	0	.353	3–3	5–7	414	492	L1
Cleveland Browns	5	12	0	.294	2–4	4–8	279	379	W2

==== Conference ====
AFC
Seed	Team	Division	W	L	T	PCT	DIV	CONF	SOS	SOV	STK
**Division leaders**
1 (Note: Denver finished ahead of New England based on common games (Denver 6–0 to New England 5–1 against: Cincinnati, Las Vegas, NY Giants, NY Jets and Tennessee).)	Denver Broncos	West	14	3	0	.824	5–1	9–3	.422	.378	W2
2	New England Patriots	East	14	3	0	.824	5–1	9–3	.391	.370	W3
3	Jacksonville Jaguars	South	13	4	0	.765	5–1	10–2	.478	.425	W8
4	Pittsburgh Steelers	North	10	7	0	.588	4–2	8–4	.503	.453	W1
**Wild cards**
5 (Note: Houston finished ahead of Buffalo based on head-to-head victory.)	Houston Texans	South	12	5	0	.706	5–1	10–2	.522	.441	W9
6	Buffalo Bills	East	12	5	0	.706	4–2	9–3	.471	.412	W1
7	Los Angeles Chargers	West	11	6	0	.647	5–1	8–4	.469	.425	L2
**Did not qualify for the postseason**
8 (Note: Indianapolis finished ahead of Baltimore based on conference record (Indianapolis 6–6 to Baltimore 5–7).)	Indianapolis Colts	South	8	9	0	.471	2–4	6–6	.540	.382	L7
9	Baltimore Ravens	North	8	9	0	.471	3–3	5–7	.507	.408	L1
10	Miami Dolphins	East	7	10	0	.412	3–3	3–9	.488	.378	L1
11 (Note: Cincinnati finished ahead of Kansas City based on conference record (Cincinnati 5–7 to Kansas City 3–9).)	Cincinnati Bengals	North	6	11	0	.353	3–3	5–7	.521	.451	L1
12	Kansas City Chiefs	West	6	11	0	.353	1–5	3–9	.514	.363	L6
13	Cleveland Browns	North	5	12	0	.294	2–4	4–8	.486	.418	W2
14 (Note: Las Vegas finished ahead of NY Jets and Tennessee based on conference record (Las Vegas 3–9 to NY Jets 2–10 and Tennessee 2–10).)	Las Vegas Raiders	West	3	14	0	.176	1–5	3–9	.538	.451	W1
15 (Note: NY Jets finished ahead of Tennessee based on strength of victory (NY Jets .373 to Tennessee .275).)	New York Jets	East	3	14	0	.176	0–6	2–10	.552	.373	L5
16	Tennessee Titans	South	3	14	0	.176	0–6	2–10	.574	.275	L2
**Tiebreakers** (Note: When breaking ties for three or more teams under the NFL's rules, they are first broken within divisions, then comparing only the highest ranked remaining team from each division.)
