= List of Roswell High School (Georgia) state championship appearances =

This is a list of Roswell High School (Georgia) state championship appearances. Roswell High School is located in Roswell, Georgia and has a rich tradition of athletic competition that began when the school opened in 1949. Roswell's mascot is the hornet and fields athletic teams in 16 sports organized under the Georgia High School Association. The following lists details seasons in which the Hornets finished as state champions, runners-up, or in some cases within the top four of the state in various sports offered by the school.

Football State Championship Appearances
Year	Winning Team		Losing Team		Location (all in Georgia)	Class	Roswell's Record
1956	Monticello	35	Roswell	6	Roswell High School, Roswell	C	7–4–1
1968	Roswell	36	Irwin County	6	Roswell High School, Roswell	B	13–0
1970	Roswell	28	Warren County	12	The Brickyard Stadium, Thomson	A	12–2
2006	Roswell; Peachtree Ridge	14	N/A — Tie	14	McEachern High School, Powder Springs	AAAAA	13–1–1
2015	Colquitt County	30	Roswell	13	Georgia Dome, Atlanta	AAAAAA	14–1
2016	Grayson	23	Roswell	20	Georgia Dome, Atlanta	AAAAAAA	14-1

Girls' Gymnastics State Championship Appearances
Year	State Champion Team	State Runner-Up Team
1994	Heritage	Roswell
1995	Heritage	Roswell
1997	Roswell	Milton
2000	Roswell	Milton
2001	Roswell	Milton
2002	Roswell	Oconee County
2003	Roswell	Oconee County
2004	Oconee County	Roswell
2005	Roswell	Lassiter
2007	Roswell	Milton

Baseball State Championship Appearances
Year	State Champion Team	State Runner-Up Team	Class
1969	Terrell County	Roswell	B
1970	Roswell	N/A	B
1971	Roswell	N/A	A
1976	Bradwell Institute	Roswell	AA
1986	Roswell	Jones County	AAA
2013	Milton	Roswell	AAAAAA.

Boys' Golf State Championship Appearances
Year	State Champion Team	State Runner-Up Team	Class
1983	Dalton	Roswell	AAA
1990	Roswell	Glynn Academy	AAAA
1992	Glynn Academy	Roswell	AAAA
1993	Benedictine	Roswell	AAAA
2006	Colquitt County	Roswell	AAAAA
2014	Peachtree Ridge	Roswell Johns Creek	AAAAAA

State Championship Appearances — Track & Field and Cross Country
Team	Year	Finish	Class
Boys Track & Field	1957	State Runner-Up	C
Boys Track & Field	1959	State Champions	C
Boys Track & Field	1961	State Champions	B
Boys Cross Country	1973	State Runner-Up	A
Boys Track & Field	1974	State Runner-Up	A

Lacrosse State Championship Appearances
Year	Winning Team		Losing Team		Location (all in Georgia)	Class	Roswell's Record
2012	Milton	25	Roswell	6	Milton High School, Milton	Girls AAAAA	13–5–1
2014	Roswell	6	Lambert	5	Roswell High School, Roswell	Boys AAAAAA	20-2
2015	Roswell	12	Pope	9	Roswell High School, Roswell	Boys AAAAAA	17-3

State Championship Appearances — Other Sports
Sport	Year	Finish	Class	Notes
Boys Basketball	1971	State Champions	A	Defeated Calhoun County 65-52
Boys Basketball	1997	State Champions	AAAA	Defeated Marietta 43-38
Competition Cheerleading	2007	Third	COED	Finished behind Rome and Duluth
Competition Cheerleading	2008	Third	COED	Finished behind Woodland and Peachtree Ridge
Riflery	2000	State Runner-Up	A-AAAAA (open event)	Champ was East Coweta
Boys Soccer	1987	State Runner-Up	A-AAAA	lost to St. Pius
Girls Soccer	2003	Semifinalist	AAAAA	13-6-0 record
Softball	1992	State Champions	AAAA	First girls team to win a state title for Roswell
Softball	2004	Third	AAAAA	22-12 record
Girls Tennis	2012	State Champions	AAAAA	22-0 record
Wrestling	2013	4th Place	AAAAAA	24-7 dual record, Region Champions in Dual and Traditional Formats
