= Alex Gray (safety) =

American gridiron football player (born 1993)

No. 35, 11
- Position: Safety

Personal information
- Born: September 15, 1993 (age 33); Suwanee, Georgia, U.S.
- Listed height: 6 ft 3 in (1.91 m)
- Listed weight: 225 lb (102 kg)

Career information
- High school: Peachtree Ridge HS
- College: Appalachian State
- NFL draft: 2017: undrafted

Career history
- Tampa Bay Buccaneers (2017)*; Edmonton Eskimos (2017–2018); Columbus Destroyers (2019)
- * Offseason or practice squad member only

Awards and highlights
- First Defensive Team All-Sun Belt Conference (2016); Second-team All-Sun Belt Conference (2016)

Paul Alexander Gray is an American former professional football safety. He played college football at Appalachian State.

== Professional career ==
Gray signed with the Tampa Bay Buccaneers as an undrafted free agent on May 1, 2017. He was waived on July 30, 2017. On March 11, 2019, Gray was assigned to the Columbus Destroyers. He was assigned to the Destroyers again on May 6, 2019.
