= Devin Bush Jr. =

American football player (born 1998)

Devin Bush
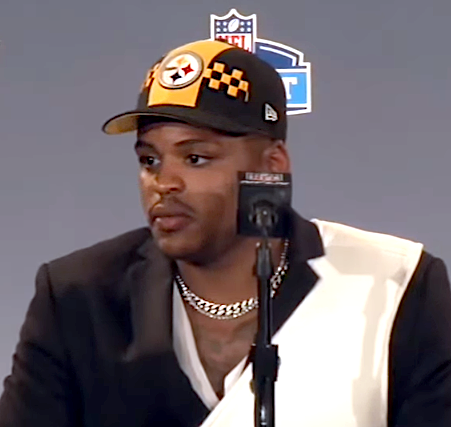
- Bush in 2019

No. 12 – Chicago Bears
- Position: Linebacker
- Roster status: Active

Personal information
- Born: July 18, 1998 (age 28); Pembroke Pines, Florida, U.S.
- Listed height: 5 ft 11 in (1.80 m)
- Listed weight: 234 lb (106 kg)

Career information
- High school: Flanagan (Pembroke Pines)
- College: Michigan (2016–2018)
- NFL draft: 2019: 1st round, 10th overall pick

Career history
- Pittsburgh Steelers (2019–2022); Seattle Seahawks (2023); Cleveland Browns (2024–2025); Chicago Bears (2026–present)

Awards and highlights
- PFWA All-Rookie Team (2019); Consensus All-American (2018); Second-team All-American (2017); Big Ten Defensive Player of the Year (2018); Big Ten Linebacker of the Year (2018); 2× First-team All-Big Ten (2017, 2018)

Career NFL statistics as of Week 9, 2026
- Total tackles: 577
- Sacks: 9.0
- Forced fumbles: 4
- Fumble recoveries: 8
- Pass deflections: 27
- Interceptions: 5
- Defensive touchdowns: 2
- Stats at Pro Football Reference

Devin Marquese Bush Jr. (born July 18, 1998) is an American professional football linebacker for the Chicago Bears of the National Football League (NFL). He played college football for the Michigan Wolverines, twice earning All-American honors, and was selected by the Pittsburgh Steelers in the first round of the 2019 NFL draft.

== Early life ==
Bush was born in 1998. He is the son of Devin Bush Sr., who played at the safety position in the National Football League (NFL) from 1995 to 2002. Bush grew up in Pembroke Pines, Florida, where he attended Charles W. Flanagan High School and played high school football.

== College career ==
=== Recruiting and 2016 season ===
In December 2015, Bush rejected a scholarship offer from Florida State, where his father played, and committed instead to play college football for the Michigan Wolverines football team. In February 2016, Michigan hired Bush's father as a defensive analyst for the football coaching staff.

Bush enrolled at the University of Michigan in the fall of 2016. He appeared in all 13 games as a freshman for the 2016 Michigan Wolverines football team. He earned a reputation as the hardest hitting player on the Michigan team.

In April 2017, Bush impressed observers in the spring game.

=== 2017 season ===
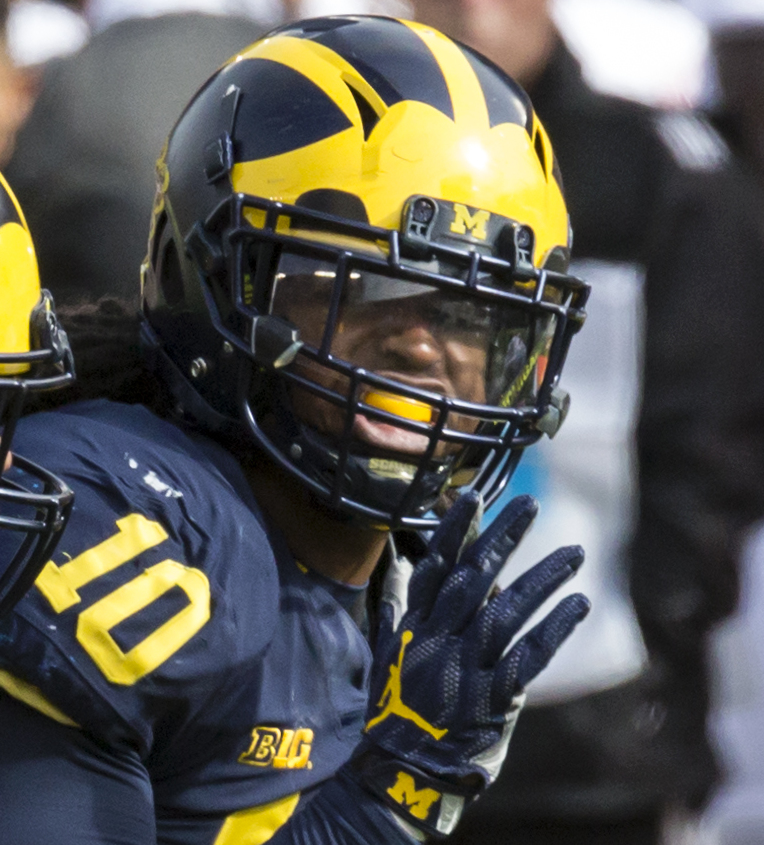
Bush with the Michigan Wolverines in 2017

Bush won the starting job at inside linebacker on the 2017 Michigan team.

In the season opener against Florida, he posted a team-high seven tackles, including three tackles for loss and two sacks.

Two weeks later, he had a career-high 12 tackles against Air Force on September 16, 2017. Through the first three games of the season, he led the Big Ten Conference with four sacks and five tackles for loss.

After Michigan defeated Purdue on September 23, Nick Baumgardner of the Detroit Free Press credited Bush with 13 "impact plays" in the game, rated him the best player on Michigan's defensive unit, and called him "more or less, a one-man wrecking crew."

During the 2017 season, Bush was tied for seventh in the conference with 94 stops, including 35 solo tackles. His 9.5 tackles for loss include 5.0 sacks. Following the 2017 season, Bush was named to the All-Big Ten defensive first-team by the coaches, and second-team by the media. He was also named a second-team All-American by Walter Camp Football Foundation.

=== 2018 season ===
Prior to the 2018 season, Bush was voted captain of the Wolverines by his teammates. Bush was also named an AP preseason first-team All-American. During the opening game against Notre Dame where he had 1.5 sacks, Bush left the game during the second quarter and was evaluated for cramps.

On October 20, prior to playing against Michigan State Spartans after MSU players attempted to engage in their pre-game ritual late and through Michigan players, Bush defaced the Spartan logo at midfield. During the 2018 season, Bush was the team's leading tackler with 80 stops, and he ranked second on the team in tackles for loss (9.5) and sacks (5.0). Following the season, he was named Nagurski–Woodson Defensive Player of the Year, Butkus–Fitzgerald Linebacker of the Year and was named to the All-Big Ten defensive first-team by both the coaches and media. He was also named a consensus All-American. On December 19, 2018, Bush announced that he would forgo his senior season to declare for the 2019 NFL draft; also, that he would not play in Michigan's bowl game, the Peach Bowl.

== Professional career ==
Pre-draft measurables
Height	Weight	Arm length	Hand span	Wingspan	40-yard dash	10-yard split	20-yard split	20-yard shuttle	Three-cone drill	Vertical jump	Broad jump	Bench press
5 ft 11 in (1.80 m)	234 lb (106 kg)	32 in (0.81 m)	9 5/8 in (0.24 m)	6 ft 4 1/2 in (1.94 m)	4.43 s	1.53 s	2.58 s	4.23 s	6.93 s	40.5 in (1.03 m)	10 ft 4 in (3.15 m)	21 reps
All values from NFL Combine

=== Pittsburgh Steelers ===
==== 2019 ====
The Pittsburgh Steelers selected Bush in the first round (10th overall) of the 2019 NFL draft. His father, Devin Bush Sr., was also a first round (26th overall) pick in the 1995 NFL draft. The Steelers traded their first round (20th) and second round (52nd overall) picks in the 2019 NFL draft and a third-round pick (83rd overall) in the 2020 NFL draft to Denver Broncos in exchange for the tenth overall pick which was used in order to draft Bush. On May 12, 2019, the Steelers signed Bush to a fully guaranteed four-year, $18.87 million contract that includes a signing bonus of $11.74 million.

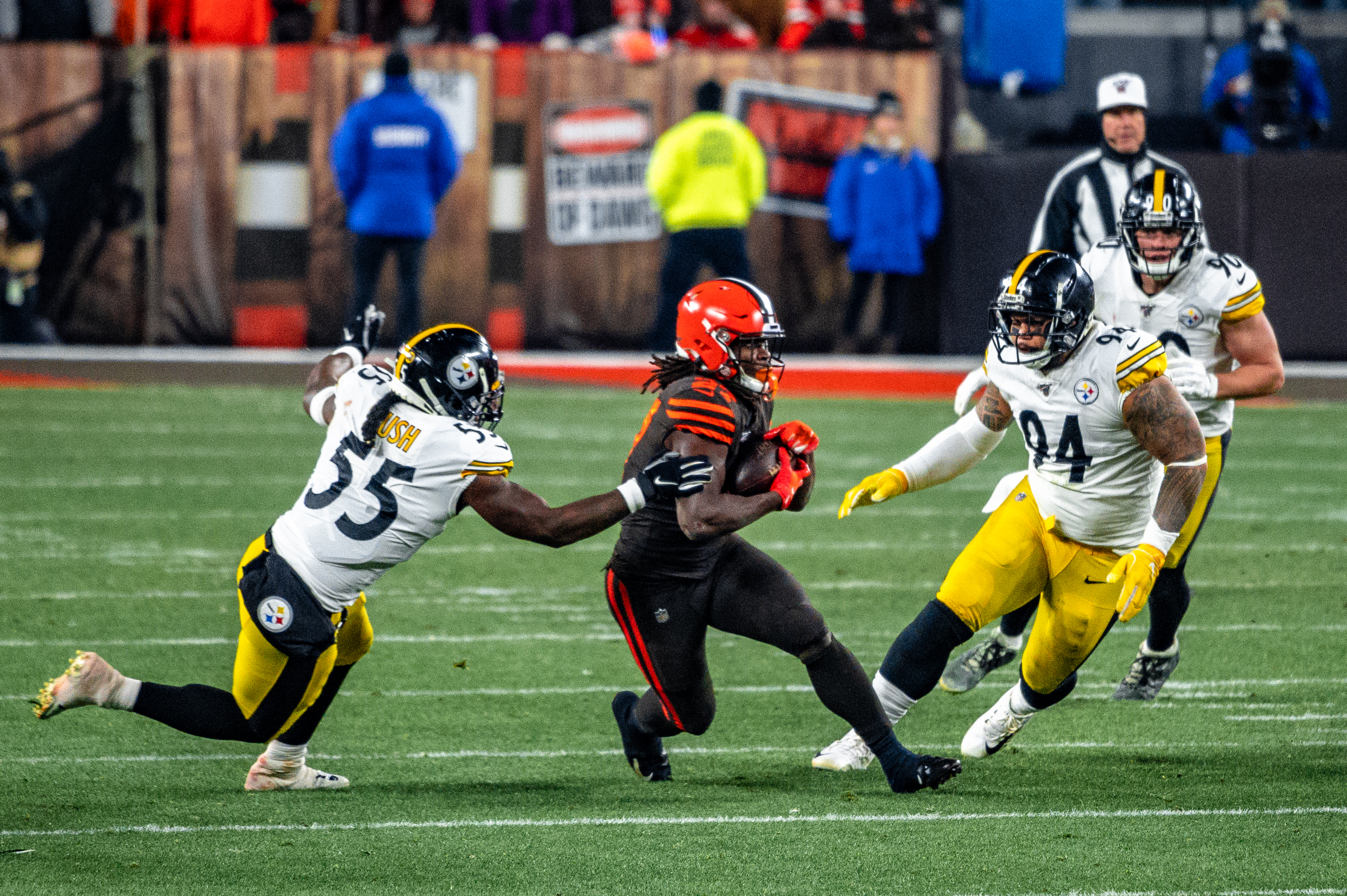
Bush in a game against the Cleveland Browns

Bush made his NFL debut in Week 1 against the New England Patriots. In the game, Bush made 11 tackles in the 33–3 loss. In Week 3 against the San Francisco 49ers, Bush recorded a team high 11 tackles and recovered a fumble forced by safety Minkah Fitzpatrick in the 24–20 loss. In Week 4 against the Cincinnati Bengals, Bush recorded nine tackles and made his first career sack on Andy Dalton in the 27–3 win. In Week 5 against the Baltimore Ravens, Bush recorded his first career interception off Lamar Jackson in the 26–23 loss. In Week 6 against the Los Angeles Chargers, Bush made a team high seven tackles, recovered a fumble lost by Philip Rivers which he returned for a touchdown, and recorded an interception off Rivers in the 24–17 win. Bush became the first rookie to record a fumble return for a touchdown and an interception in the same game since Chicago Bears' safety Eddie Jackson accomplished this feat in 2017. He was named the American Football Conference Defensive Player of the Week for his performance. In Week 12 against the Bengals, Bush recorded four tackles and forced a fumble on wide receiver Tyler Boyd which was recovered by Minkah Fitzpatrick in the 16–10 win. In Week 17 against the Baltimore Ravens, Bush recorded a team high 12 tackles during the 28–10 loss. During the game, Bush surpassed 100 tackles on the season. He was named to the PFWA All-Rookie Team.

==== 2020 ====
Bush started the first five games of the 2020 season, playing every defensive snap, recording 26 total tackles as well as 16 solo tackles and a sack. Bush suffered a torn ACL in the second quarter of the week 6 game against the Cleveland Browns, and was placed on injured reserve on October 23, 2020.

==== 2021 ====
Bush appeared in and started 14 games in the 2021 season. He recorded two sacks, 70 total tackles, four passes defended, and one forced fumble.

==== 2022 ====
The Steelers declined the fifth-year option on Bush's contract on May 2, 2022, making him a free agent after the season. He played in 17 games with 14 starts, recording 81 tackles and two passes defended.

=== Seattle Seahawks ===
On March 16, 2023, the Seattle Seahawks signed Bush to a one-year, $3.5 million contract. He played in 13 games with three starts playing primarily special teams and as a backup linebacker on defense.

=== Cleveland Browns ===
On March 15, 2024, Bush signed a one-year contract with the Cleveland Browns. He made 16 appearances (10 starts) for Cleveland in 2024, registering three pass deflections, one sack, and 76 combined tackles.

On March 11, 2025, Bush re-signed with the Browns on a one-year, $3.25 million contract. In Week 18, Bush recorded 14 tackles and returned an interception 97 yards for a touchdown in a 20–18 win over the Cincinnati Bengals, earning AFC Defensive Player of the Week. Bush had a career year in 2025, starting all 17 games, and finishing second on the team with a career-high 125 tackles, along with two sacks, two forced fumbles, eight passes defensed, and three interceptions, two of which he returned for touchdowns.

=== Chicago Bears ===
On March 11, 2026, Bush signed a three-year, $30 million contract with the Chicago Bears.

== Career statistics ==
Legend
	Led the league
**Bold**	Career high

=== NFL ===
==== Regular season ====
Year	Team	Games		Tackles					Interceptions					Fumbles			
Year	Team	GP	GS	Cmb	Solo	Ast	Sck	TFL	Int	Yds	Lng	TD	PD	FF	FR	Yds	TD
2019	PIT	16	15	109	**72**	37	1.0	**9**	2	6	6	0	4	1	**4**	**20**	**1**
2020	PIT	5	5	26	16	10	1.0	0	0	0	0	0	3	0	0	0	0
2021	PIT	14	14	70	41	29	**2.0**	2	0	0	0	0	4	1	1	−1	0
2022	PIT	17	14	81	44	37	0.0	2	0	0	0	0	2	0	0	0	0
2023	SEA	13	3	37	18	19	0.0	5	0	0	0	0	0	0	0	0	0
2024	CLE	16	10	76	45	31	1.0	8	0	0	0	0	3	0	0	0	0
2025	CLE	17	17	**125**	63	**62**	**2.0**	7	**3**	**164**	**97**	**2**	**8**	**2**	1	0	0
2026	CHI	9	9	53	29	24	2.0	7	0	0	0	0	3	0	2	0	0
Career		107	87	577	328	249	9.0	40	5	170	97	2	27	4	8	19	1

==== Postseason ====
Year	Team	Games		Tackles					Interceptions					Fumbles			
Year	Team	GP	GS	Cmb	Solo	Ast	Sck	TFL	Int	Yds	Lng	TD	PD	FF	FR	Yds	TD
2021	PIT	1	1	1	1	0	0.0	0	1	10	10	0	1	0	0	0	0
Career		1	1	1	1	0	0.0	0	1	10	10	0	1	0	0	0	0

=== College ===
Year	Team	Class	Pos	GP	Tackles					Interceptions					Fumbles			
Year	Team	Class	Pos	GP	Solo	Ast	Cmb	TfL	Sck	Int	Yds	Avg	TD	PD	FR	Yds	TD	FF
2016	Michigan	FR	LB	7	6	5	11	0.0	0.0	0	0	0.0	0	0	0	0	0	0
2017	Michigan	SO	LB	13	**44**	**51**	**95**	**10.0**	**5.5**	**1**	0	0.0	0	**7**	0	0	0	0
2018	Michigan	JR	LB	12	41	25	66	8.5	4.5	0	0	0.0	0	4	0	0	0	0
Career				32	91	81	172	18.5	10.0	1	0	0.0	0	11	0	0	0	0

== Personal life ==
On May 4, 2025, Bush was arrested in Bell Acres, Pennsylvania on simple assault and harassment charges. His preliminary court hearing is set for May 20. On December 16, Bush was found not guilty of assault and harassment charges.
