= Peachtree Ridge High School =

Public high school in Suwanee, Georgia, U.S.

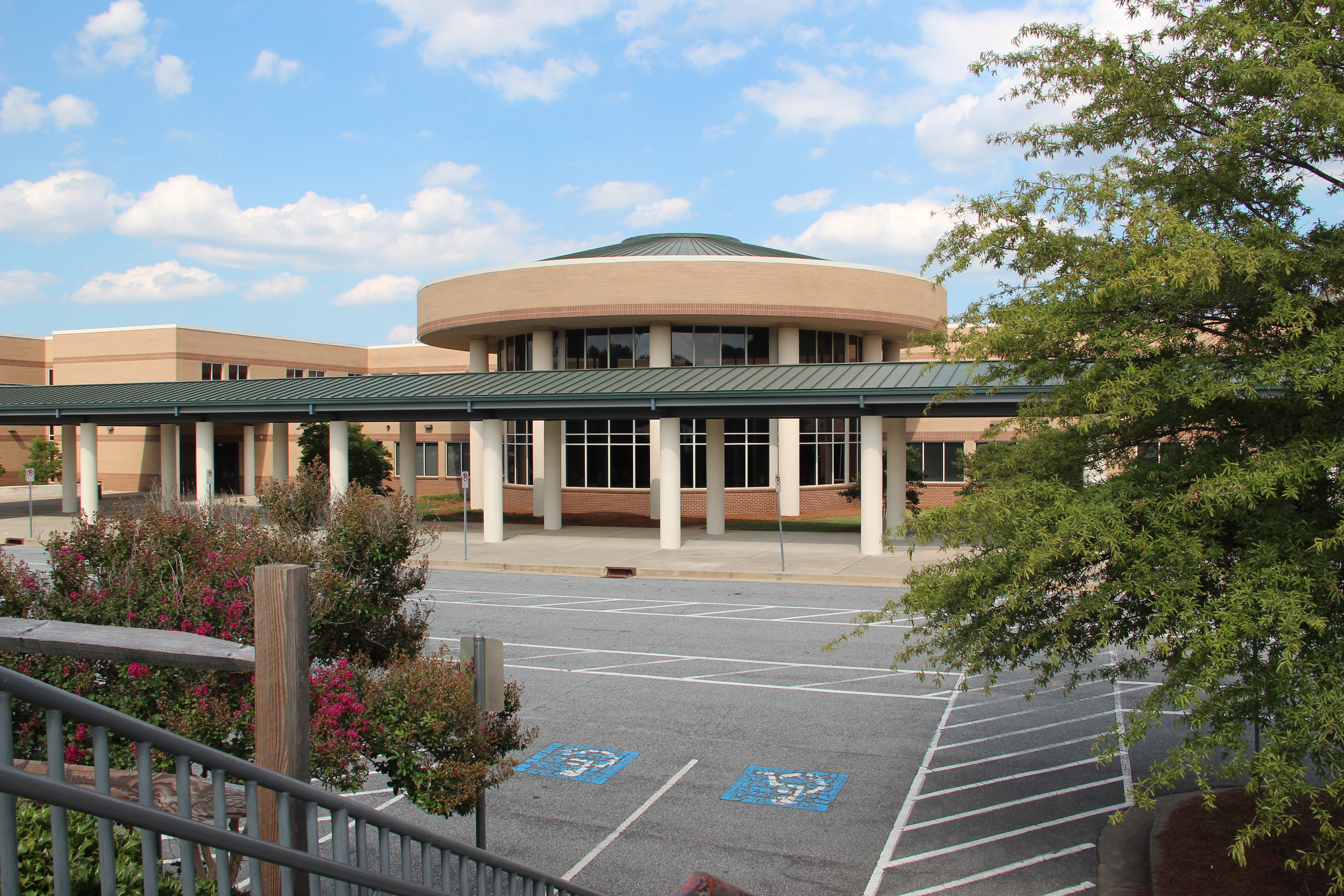

Location
- 1555 Old Peachtree Road; Suwanee, Gwinnett County, Georgia 30024; United States; 34°00′47″N 84°05′14″W

Information
- Other name: PRHS
- School type: Public
- Established: 2003
- School district: Gwinnett County Public Schools
- NCES School ID: 130255002903
- Principal: Jadd Jarusinski
- Teaching staff: 181.90 (FTE)
- Grades: 9–12
- Enrollment: 3,304 (2023–24)
- Student to teacher ratio: 18.16
- Colors: White and royal blue with red accents
- Mascot: Lions
- Nickname: Ridge
- Newspaper: The Roar
- Literary magazine: Masquerade
- Website: www.peachtreeridge.org

Peachtree Ridge High School (PRHS) is a public high school in unincorporated Suwanee, Georgia, United States. It is a part of Gwinnett County Public Schools. It is one of three public schools in the county to use block scheduling, the others being Shiloh High School and the Gwinnett School of Mathematics, Science, and Technology.

== History ==
Peachtree Ridge High School is located on Old Peachtree Road. It is located on land which belonged to the heirs of Eugene Baynes. A lake behind the school is named Lake Louella after Mrs. Louise Ella Baynes, as is Lake Louella Road near the school. A few hundred yards from the school is the Goodwin home, which was built in 1823 and is the oldest building in Suwanee.

Construction of the 418,000-square-foot (38,800 m^{2}) school's main facility commenced in March 2001. PRHS was constructed to relieve overcrowding at four neighboring high schools. When its doors opened for the 2003–2004 academic year, almost all of the sophomores, juniors, and seniors came from either Duluth High School in Duluth, Collins Hill High School in Suwanee, or North Gwinnett High School in Suwanee.

The school officially opened for classes on Monday, August 11, 2003, with enrollment topping 1,900 students. By November of the same year, another 19,570 square feet (1,818 m^{2}) of athletic facilities (field house) were nearing completion.

== Clubs ==
=== The Roar ===
In 2007, the school's newspaper, The Roar, earned first place in the general excellence category at an awards ceremony sponsored by the Gwinnett Daily Post. The staff of The Roar was recognized for the best news section, best layout/design, honorable mention for best sports section, and first place in general excellence.

=== NJROTC ===
In 2022, the Peachtree Ridge High School NJROTC received 21st place at the 2022 NJROTC Navy Nationals hosted at Pensacola, Naval Air Station, Florida. The "Lions Battalion" received a 3rd place trophy for the shuttle run event.

== Athletics ==
Peachtree Ridge competes in Region 7-AAAAAA.

== Notable alumni ==
- Kevin Anderson (2007), college basketball coach, played overseas
- Drew Butler (2007), NFL punter
- Zach Graham (2007), basketball player who played overseas
- Cameron Heyward (2007), All-Pro defensive tackle for the Pittsburgh Steelers
- Tommy Donatell (2008), assistant coach for the Washington Commanders
- Asher Clark (2008), former college football running back
- Kevin Minter (2009), NFL linebacker
- Bradley Roby (2010), NFL cornerback
- Taylor Rooks (2010), sports reporter and broadcaster
- Jared Walsh (2011), All-Star first baseman
- Alex Gray (2012), professional football safety
- Orlando Brown Jr. (2014), Pro Bowl offensive lineman for the Cincinnati Bengals
- Joe Horn Jr. (2014), professional football wide receiver
- Nick Neidert (2015), MLB pitcher
- Nigel Warrior (2016), NFL safety
- Connor Heyward (2017), tight end for the Pittsburgh Steelers
- Romello White (2016 - transferred), basketball player who plays overseas
- Payne Durham (2018), tight end for the Tampa Bay Buccaneers
- Kingsley Enagbare (2018 - transferred), defensive end for the Green Bay Packers
- Jaylen Johnson (2018), wide receiver for the Los Angeles Chargers
- Devon Higgs (2018), NBA G-League basketball player
- Devin Vassell (2018), basketball player for the San Antonio Spurs
- Robert Beal Jr. (2019), defensive end for the San Francisco 49ers
- Dom Jones (2019), cornerback for the Cleveland Browns
- Amari McNeill (2021), NFL defensive tackle
