= Kaden Davis =

American football player (born 1997)

No. 81 – Chicago Bears
- Positions: Wide receiver, return specialist
- Roster status: Practice squad

Personal information
- Born: September 25, 1998 (age 28); Ellsworth, Kansas, U.S.
- Listed height: 6 ft 1 in (1.85 m)
- Listed weight: 190 lb (86 kg)

Career information
- High school: Ellsworth
- College: Butler CC (2017–2018); Northwest Missouri State (2019–2021)
- NFL draft: 2022: undrafted

Career history
- Denver Broncos (2022)*; Michigan Panthers (2023); Arizona Cardinals (2023); Detroit Lions (2024)*; Denver Broncos (2024)*; Cleveland Browns (2025); Houston Gamblers (2026); Chicago Bears (2026–present)
- * Offseason or practice squad member only

Career NFL statistics as of 2025
- Return yards: 135
- Stats at Pro Football Reference

Kaden Davis (born September 25, 1998) is an American professional football wide receiver and return specialist for the Chicago Bears of the National Football League (NFL). He played college football for the Northwest Missouri State Bearcats and was signed by the Denver Broncos as an undrafted free agent in 2022. He has also played for the Cleveland Browns, the Michigan Panthers of the United States Football League (USFL), and the Houston Gamblers of the United Football League (UFL).

== Early life ==
Davis lettered at Ellsworth High School in Ellsworth, Kansas, where he played tight end, linebacker, and defensive back. As a senior, Davis caught 857 yards and 15 touchdowns and was selected to play in the 2017 Kansas Shrine All-Star Bowl, where he was Ellsworth's first selection in 25 years. Despite the performance, Davis was a zero-star recruit who received not a single NCAA Division I scholarship, although Kansas State offered him a walk-on spot in track.

Davis first attended Butler Community College and primarily served as a returner. He was offered a walk-on spot at Kansas State, but chose a full-ride scholarship and an immediate starting position at Northwest Missouri State, an NCAA Division II school. As a senior, Davis led the team with 10 touchdowns on 703 yards receiving, helping the team to a semifinal playoff appearance and earning all-conference honors.

== Professional career ==
Pre-draft measurables
Height	Weight	Arm length	Hand span	Wingspan	40-yard dash	10-yard split	20-yard split	20-yard shuttle	Three-cone drill	Vertical jump	Broad jump	Bench press
5 ft 11 3/4 in (1.82 m)	188 lb (85 kg)	31 3/4 in (0.81 m)	8 3/4 in (0.22 m)	6 ft 2 1/2 in (1.89 m)	4.44 s	1.52 s	2.60 s	4.15 s	6.88 s	36.5 in (0.93 m)	10 ft 4 in (3.15 m)	10 reps
All values from Pro Day

=== Denver Broncos (first stint) ===
Davis went undrafted and signed with the Denver Broncos May 13, 2022. He was cut on August 16. Davis was re-signed to the team's practice squad on November 10. He was released by Denver on January 11, 2023.

=== Michigan Panthers ===
On May 9, 2023, Davis was signed by the Michigan Panthers of the United States Football League. He was an instant contributor for Michigan, contributing on special teams as well as having a major role in their offense. Davis totaled 83 receiving yards, 333 return yards, and two touchdowns, totaling 416 all-purpose yards in five games.

=== Arizona Cardinals ===
On July 25, 2023, Davis was signed to the active roster for the Arizona Cardinals. He was waived on August 29, and re-signed to the practice squad. Davis signed a reserve/future contract with Arizona on January 8, 2024. He was waived on April 30.

=== Detroit Lions ===
On May 13, 2024, Davis signed with the Detroit Lions. He was waived on August 27.

=== Denver Broncos (second stint) ===
On September 11, 2024, Davis was signed to the Denver Broncos' practice squad. On October 1, he was released by the Broncos. A week later, Davis was re-signed to Denver's practice squad. On October 14, Davis was released once again.

=== Cleveland Browns ===
On December 10, 2024, the Cleveland Browns signed Davis to their practice squad. On January 3, 2025, he was promoted to the active roster.

On August 26, 2025, Davis was waived by the Browns as part of final roster cuts and re-signed to the practice squad the next day. On September 21, Davis was elevated to the active roster and returned one kick for 28 yards in the win against the Green Bay Packers. On November 12, he was signed to the active roster. Davis was waived on November 18 and re-signed to the practice squad two days later.

=== Houston Gamblers ===
On April 28, 2026, Davis signed with the Houston Gamblers of the United Football League (UFL).

=== Chicago Bears ===
On June 16, 2026, Davis signed with the Chicago Bears. Davis was waived by the Bears as a part of final roster cuts on August 30; he was re-signed to the team's practice squad the following day. Davis was elevated to the active roster for the season opener against the Carolina Panthers. He recovered a muffed punt in the game, setting up a Chicago field goal.
