= Sam Webb (American football) =

American football player (born 1998)

No. 48, 27, 39
- Position: Cornerback

Personal information
- Born: May 19, 1998 (age 28); Excelsior Springs, Missouri, U.S.
- Listed height: 6 ft 0 in (1.83 m)
- Listed weight: 202 lb (92 kg)

Career information
- High school: Excelsior Springs
- College: Missouri Western (2016–2021)
- NFL draft: 2022: undrafted

Career history
- Las Vegas Raiders (2022–2023); Carolina Panthers (2023); Las Vegas Raiders (2023–2024); Tennessee Titans (2025)*; Cleveland Browns (2025); Denver Broncos (2026)*; New York Giants (2026)*
- * Offseason or practice squad member only

Awards and highlights
- First team All-MIAA (2021)

Career NFL statistics
- Total tackles: 45
- Forced fumbles: 1
- Fumble recoveries: 1
- Pass deflections: 4
- Defensive touchdowns: 1
- Stats at Pro Football Reference

Sam Webb (born May 19, 1998) is an American former professional football player who was a cornerback in the National Football League (NFL). He played college football for the Missouri Western Griffons and was signed by the Las Vegas Raiders as an undrafted free agent in 2022. Webb also played for the Carolina Panthers and Cleveland Browns.

== Professional career ==
Pre-draft measurables
Height	Weight	Arm length	Hand span	Wingspan	40-yard dash	10-yard split	20-yard split	20-yard shuttle	Three-cone drill	Vertical jump	Broad jump	Bench press
6 ft 0 1/2 in (1.84 m)	202 lb (92 kg)	32 1/8 in (0.82 m)	9 1/4 in (0.23 m)	6 ft 6 in (1.98 m)	4.48 s	1.54 s	2.64 s	4.18 s	6.94 s	42.5 in (1.08 m)	11 ft 4 in (3.45 m)	14 reps
All values from NFL Combine/Pro Day

=== Las Vegas Raiders ===
Webb signed with the Las Vegas Raiders on April 30, 2022, following the 2022 NFL draft. Webb made the initial 53-man roster out of training camp. He played in all 17 games with three starts, recording 36 tackles, three passes defensed, and a forced fumble.

On August 29, 2023, Webb was waived by the Raiders and re-signed to the practice squad.

=== Carolina Panthers ===
On September 14, 2023, Webb was signed by the Carolina Panthers off the Raiders practice squad. He was released on October 10.

=== Las Vegas Raiders (second stint) ===
On October 16, 2023, the Raiders signed Webb to their practice squad. He signed a reserve/future contract with the Raiders on January 8, 2024.

On August 27, 2024, Webb was waived by the Raiders and re-signed to the practice squad. He was promoted to the active roster on September 24.

On March 21, 2025, Webb was re-signed by the Raiders. He was waived on August 25.

=== Tennessee Titans ===
On August 28, 2025, Webb signed with the Tennessee Titans' practice squad.

=== Cleveland Browns ===
On November 19, 2025, Webb was signed by the Cleveland Browns off of the Titans' practice squad.

=== Denver Broncos ===
On July 30, 2026, Webb was signed by the Denver Broncos following an injury to cornerback Blake Cotton. On August 8, he was released by the Broncos.

=== New York Giants ===
On August 13, 2026, Webb signed with the New York Giants. On August 16, Webb was placed on the reserve/retired list after just one practice and one preseason game with the team.
