= Dom Jones =

American football player (born 2000)

Profile
- Position: Cornerback

Personal information
- Born: July 16, 2000 (age 26); Duluth, Georgia, U.S.
- Listed height: 6 ft 2 in (1.88 m)
- Listed weight: 192 lb (87 kg)

Career information
- High school: Peachtree Ridge (Suwanee, Georgia)
- College: North Dakota State (2019–2022); Colorado State (2023–2024)
- NFL draft: 2025: undrafted

Career history
- Cleveland Browns (2025)

Awards and highlights
- 2× FCS national champion (2019, 2021)

Career NFL statistics as of 2025
- Games played: 8
- Total tackles: 5
- Stats at Pro Football Reference

Dominic Jones (born July 16, 2000) is an American professional football cornerback. He played college football for the North Dakota State Bison and Colorado State Rams.

== Early life ==
Jones attended high school at Peachtree Ridge located in Suwanee, Georgia. Coming out of high school, he committed to play college football for the North Dakota State Bison.

== College career ==
=== North Dakota State ===
During his four-year career as a Bison from 2019 through 2022, he appeared in 41 games, totaling 93 tackles and three interceptions, while utilizing a redshirt season. After the conclusion of the 2022 season, he decided to enter his name into the NCAA transfer portal.

=== Colorado State ===
Jones transferred to play for the Colorado State Rams. During his two-year career at Colorado State from 2023 through 2024, he played in 25 games, recording 93 tackles, 15 pass deflections, and four interceptions.

== Professional career ==
Pre-draft measurables
| Height | Weight | Arm length | Hand span | Wingspan | 40-yard dash | 10-yard split | 20-yard split | 20-yard shuttle | Three-cone drill | Vertical jump | Broad jump | Bench press |
|---|---|---|---|---|---|---|---|---|---|---|---|---|
| 6 ft 2 1/8 in (1.88 m) | 192 lb (87 kg) | 33 in (0.84 m) | 9 1/4 in (0.23 m) | 6 ft 4 7/8 in (1.95 m) | 4.56 s | 1.59 s | 2.63 s | 4.12 s | 6.96 s | 36.5 in (0.93 m) | 10 ft 4 in (3.15 m) | 12 reps |
All values from Pro Day

On May 9, 2025, after going unselected in the 2025 NFL draft, Jones signed with the Cleveland Browns as an undrafted free agent. On August 26, he was named part of the Browns' initial 53-man roster but waived the following day and re-signed to the practice squad. On October 8, Jones was promoted to the active roster. In five appearances for Cleveland, he logged five tackles. On November 18, Jones was placed on injured reserve due to a knee injury suffered in Week 11 against the Baltimore Ravens.

Jones was waived by the Browns on July 21, 2026 with a failed physical.
