= 2025 Miami Dolphins season =

60th season in franchise history; 56th season in the NFL

- Owner: Stephen M. Ross
- General manager: Chris Grier (parted ways October 31, 2025, 2–7 record); Champ Kelly (interim, 5–3 record)
- Head coach: Mike McDaniel
- Home stadium: Hard Rock Stadium

Results
- Record: 7–10
- Division place: 3rd AFC East
- Playoffs: Did not qualify
- All-Pros: ILB Jordyn Brooks (1st team); C Aaron Brewer (2nd team)
- Pro Bowlers: RB De'Von Achane

Uniform
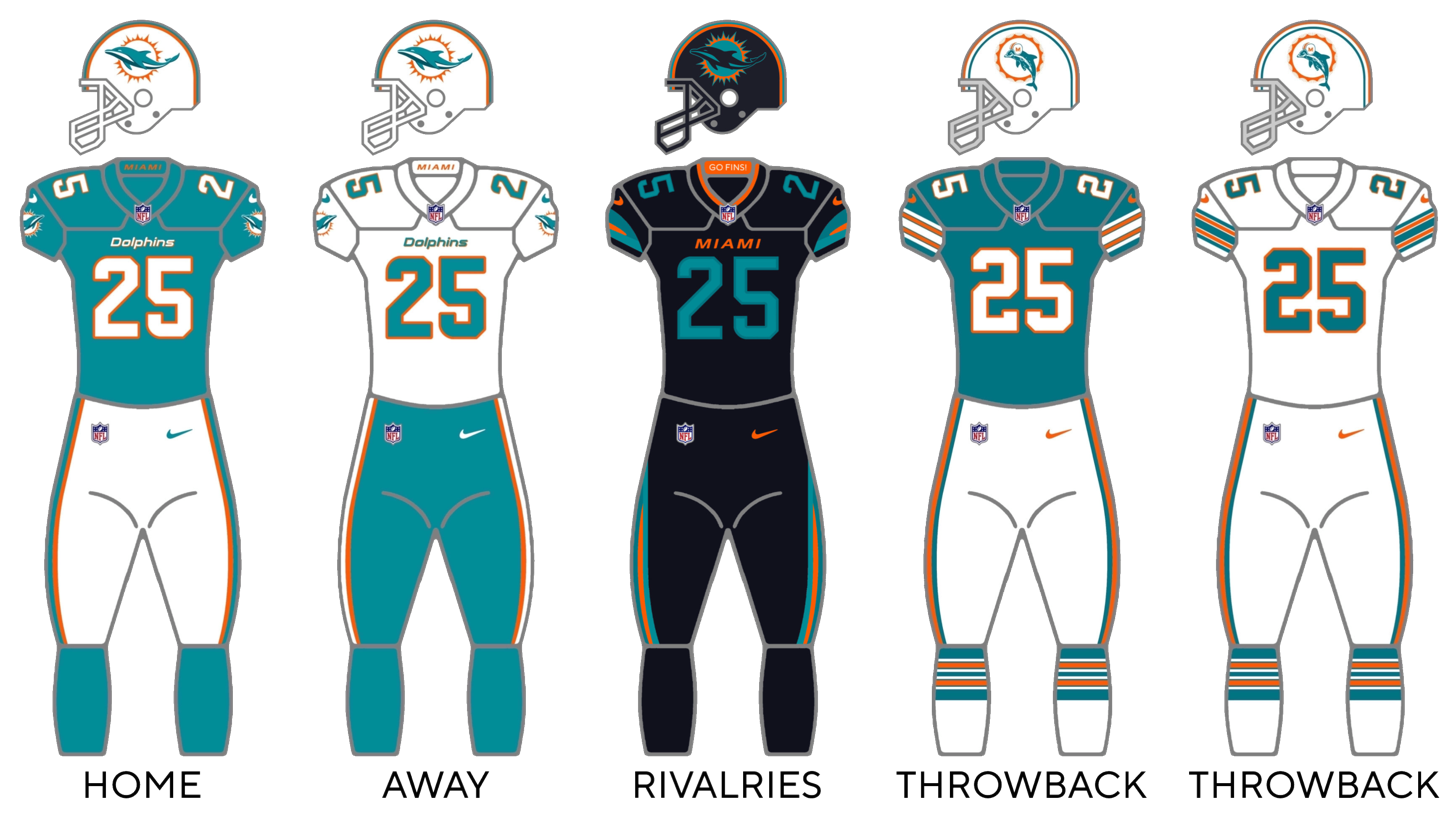

The 2025 season was the Miami Dolphins' 56th in the National Football League (NFL), their 60th overall, their tenth and final under general manager Chris Grier and their fourth and final under head coach Mike McDaniel. The Dolphins failed to improve on their 8–9 record from last year after a Week 16 loss to the Cincinnati Bengals.

The Dolphins started the season with an abysmal 2-7 record. However, they had a midseason turnaround, winning four consecutive games in a row to keep their playoff hopes alive late in the season. However, after a loss in Week 15 to the Pittsburgh Steelers, Miami was officially eliminated from playoff contention for the second consecutive season. This also extended their playoff victory drought to 25 seasons — the longest active playoff victory drought in the NFL.

On October 31, the Dolphins and general manager Chris Grier parted ways shortly after a Week 9 loss to the Baltimore Ravens. After an inconsistent season from starting quarterback Tua Tagovailoa, he was benched ahead of the week 16 matchup against the Cincinnati Bengals for rookie Quinn Ewers. The Dolphins went 5–4 at home but 2–6 on the road, which ultimately cost them a trip to the postseason.

Head coach Mike McDaniel was fired on January 8, 2026, following the conclusion of the season.

This would also be Tua's final season with Miami, as they ended up releasing him in the offseason and he signed with the Atlanta Falcons.

== Draft ==
2025 Miami Dolphins draft selections
Round	Selection	Player	Position	College	Notes
1	13	Kenneth Grant	DE	Michigan	
2	37	Jonah Savaiinaea	G	Arizona	From Las Vegas Raiders
2	48	Traded to the Las Vegas Raiders			
3	79	Traded to the Philadelphia Eagles (Note: The Dolphins traded a third-round selection (79th overall) to the Philadelphia Eagles in exchange for a 2024 fourth-round selection (120th overall).)			
3	98	Traded to the Las Vegas Raiders			Compensatory selection
4	116	Traded to the Houston Texans			
4	135	Traded to the Las Vegas Raiders			Compensatory selection
5	143	Jordan Phillips	NT	Maryland	From Las Vegas Raiders
5	150	Jason Marshall Jr.	CB	Florida	
5	155	Dante Trader Jr.	S	Maryland	From Broncos (Note: The Dolphins traded 2023 first-round and 2024 fourth-round selections, and RB Chase Edmonds to the Denver Broncos in exchange for a fifth-round selection (155th overall) and LB Bradley Chubb.)
6	179	Ollie Gordon II	RB	Oklahoma State	From Houston
6	192	Traded to the Chicago Bears (Note: The Dolphins traded a sixth-round selection (192nd overall) to the Chicago Bears in exchange for a seventh-round selection (224th overall) and WR Chase Claypool.)			
7	224	Traded to the Houston Texans			From Bears
7	231	Quinn Ewers	QB	Texas	
7	253	Zeek Biggers	DE	Georgia Tech	Compensatory selection

Draft trades

2025 Miami Dolphins undrafted free agents
Position	Player	College
CB	BJ Adams	UCF
WR	Andrew Armstrong	Arkansas
LB	Eugene Asante	Auburn
WR	Monaray Baldwin	Baylor
TE	Jalin Conyers	Texas Tech
WR	A. J. Henning	Northwestern
LS	Kneeland Hibbett	Alabama
DT	Alex Huntley	South Carolina
OL	Tedi Kushi	Western Michigan
RB	Nate Noel	Missouri
OL	Josh Priebe	Michigan
CB	Ethan Robinson	Minnesota
DT	Tre'vonn Rybka	Kentucky
S	John Saunders Jr.	Ole Miss
WR	Theo Wease Jr.	Missouri
OL	Addison West	Western Michigan

== Staff ==
2025 Miami Dolphins staff
Front office: Chairman/managing general partner – Stephen Ross; Vice chairman/partner – Bruce Beal; Vice chairman – Jorge Pérez; Vice chairman – Matt Higgins; Vice chairman, president, and CEO – Tom Garfinkel; Interim general manager – Champ Kelly; Assistant general manager – Marvin Allen; Senior vice president, football and business administration – Brandon Shore; Senior vice president, chief financial officer – Chris Clements; Director of college scouting – Matt Winston; Senior national scout - Ron Brockington; Senior director of football administration and strategy - Max Napolitano; Director of football and business administration- Olivia Sheehy; Manager, football analytics - Ella Summer; Special advisor to the vice chairman, president and CEO – Dan Marino; Head coaches: Head coach – Mike McDaniel; Associate head coach/running backs – Eric Studesville; Assistant head coach/tight ends – Jon Embree; Offensive coaches: Offensive coordinator – Frank Smith; Senior passing game coordinator – Bobby Slowik; Quarterbacks/pass game coordinator – Darrell Bevell; Wide receivers – Robert Prince; Assistant wide receivers – Jonathan Krause; Offensive line – Butch Barry; Assistant offensive line – Lemuel Jeanpierre; Run game specialist – Chandler Henley; Offensive assistant – Rob Everett; Offensive assistant – Max McCaffrey; Offensive assistant – Roman Sapolu	Defensive coaches: Defensive coordinator – Anthony Weaver; Defensive line – Austin Clark; Assistant defensive line – Kynjee Cotton; Linebackers/run game coordinator – Joe Barry; Assistant linebackers – Matthew O'Donnell; Pass game coordinator/secondary – Brian Duker; Cornerbacks – Mathieu Araujo; Defensive backs/pass game specialist – Ryan Slowik; Assistant defensive backs – DeShawn Shead; Defensive assistant – Sean Ryan; Special teams coaches: Special teams coordinator – Craig Aukerman; Senior special teams assistant – Ronnie Bradford; Strength and conditioning: Head strength and conditioning – Dave Puloka; Assistant strength and conditioning – Adam Lachance

== Final roster ==
2025 Miami Dolphins roster
Quarterbacks (QB): 14 Quinn Ewers; 15 Cam Miller; 1 Tua Tagovailoa; Running backs (RB): 28 De'Von Achane; 48 Donovan Edwards; 31 Ollie Gordon II; 30 Alec Ingold FB; 5 Jaylen Wright; Wide receivers (WR): 84 Tahj Washington; 6 Malik Washington; 17 Jaylen Waddle; 81 Theo Wease Jr.; 19 Cedrick Wilson Jr.; Tight ends (TE): 85 Greg Dulcich; 89 Julian Hill	Offensive linemen (OL): 79 Larry Borom RT; 55 Aaron Brewer C; 64 Daniel Brunskill C; 73 Austin Jackson RT; 70 Kendall Lamm LT; 60 Andrew Meyer C; 52 Patrick Paul LT; 72 Jonah Savaiinaea LG; 69 Cole Strange RG; Defensive linemen (DL): 93 Zeek Biggers DE; 91 Matthew Butler DE; 90 Kenneth Grant DE; 94 Jordan Phillips NT; 92 Zach Sieler DE	Linebackers (LB): 56 Quinton Bell OLB; 3 K. J. Britt ILB; 20 Jordyn Brooks ILB; 2 Bradley Chubb OLB; 25 Tyrel Dodson ILB; 40 Willie Gay ILB; 53 Cameron Goode OLB; 44 Chop Robinson OLB; 42 Jackson Woodard ILB; Defensive backs (DB): 27 Ethan Bonner CB; 22 Elijah Campbell FS; 21 Ashtyn Davis SS; 26 Rasul Douglas CB; 29 Minkah Fitzpatrick FS; 24 A. J. Green CB; 23 Jack Jones CB; 33 Jason Marshall Jr. CB; 9 Ifeatu Melifonwu SS; 38 Ethan Robinson CB; 11 Dante Trader Jr. S; Special teams (ST): 16 Jake Bailey P; 49 Joe Cardona LS; 47 Riley Patterson K	Practice squad: 88 A. J. Henning WR; 96 Alex Huntley DT; 59 Derrick McLendon OLB; 68 Josh Priebe G; 71 Kion Smith G; Reserve: 32 JuJu Brents CB (IR); 23 Artie Burns CB (IR); 22 Elijah Campbell FS (IR); 63 Yodny Cajuste RT (IR); 43 Jordan Colbert ILB (IR); 47 Jalin Conyers TE (IR); 78 James Daniels RG (IR); 36 Storm Duck CB (IR); 74 Liam Eichenberg G (PUP); 82 D'Wayne Eskridge WR (IR); 62 Obinna Eze LT (IR); 10 Tyreek Hill WR (IR); 62 Germain Ifedi RT (IR); 51 Caleb Johnson ILB (IR); 46 Isaiah Johnson CB (IR); 95 Benito Jones NT (IR); 4 Kader Kohou CB (IR); 43 Jason Maitre CB (IR); 8 Alexander Mattison RB (IR); 7 Jason Sanders K (IR/DFR); 83 Darren Waller TE (IR); Rookies in italics

== Preseason ==
Week	Date	Opponent	Result	Record	Venue	Recap
1	August 10	at Chicago Bears	T 24–24	0–0–1	Soldier Field	Recap
2	August 16	at Detroit Lions	W 24–17	1–0–1	Ford Field	Recap
3	August 23	Jacksonville Jaguars	W 14–6	2–0–1	Hard Rock Stadium	Recap

== Regular season ==
=== Schedule ===
Week	Date	Opponent	Result	Record	Venue	Recap
1	September 7	at Indianapolis Colts	**L** 8–33	0–1	Lucas Oil Stadium	Recap
2	September 14	**New England Patriots**	**L** 27–33	0–2	Hard Rock Stadium	Recap
3	September 18	at **Buffalo Bills**	**L** 21–31	0–3	Highmark Stadium	Recap
4	September 29	**New York Jets**	**W** 27–21	1–3	Hard Rock Stadium	Recap
5	October 5	at Carolina Panthers	**L** 24–27	1–4	Bank of America Stadium	Recap
6	October 12	Los Angeles Chargers	**L** 27–29	1–5	Hard Rock Stadium	Recap
7	October 19	at Cleveland Browns	**L** 6–31	1–6	Huntington Bank Field	Recap
8	October 26	at Atlanta Falcons	**W** 34–10	2–6	Mercedes-Benz Stadium	Recap
9	October 30	Baltimore Ravens	**L** 6–28	2–7	Hard Rock Stadium	Recap
10	November 9	**Buffalo Bills**	**W** 30–13	3–7	Hard Rock Stadium	Recap
11	November 16	Washington Commanders	**W** 16–13 (OT)	4–7	(Spain) Santiago Bernabéu Stadium (Madrid)	Recap
12	Bye					
13	November 30	New Orleans Saints	**W** 21–17	5–7	Hard Rock Stadium	Recap
14	December 7	at **New York Jets**	**W** 34–10	6–7	MetLife Stadium	Recap
15	December 15	at Pittsburgh Steelers	**L** 15–28	6–8	Acrisure Stadium	Recap
16	December 21	Cincinnati Bengals	**L** 21–45	6–9	Hard Rock Stadium	Recap
17	December 28	Tampa Bay Buccaneers	**W** 20–17	7–9	Hard Rock Stadium	Recap
18	January 4	at **New England Patriots**	**L** 10–38	7–10	Gillette Stadium	Recap

Note: Intra-division opponents are in bold text.

=== Game summaries ===
==== Week 1: at Indianapolis Colts ====
Week 1: Miami Dolphins at Indianapolis Colts – Game summary

Quarter	1	2	3	4	Total
Dolphins	0	0	0	8	**8**
**Colts**	3	17	3	10	**33**

at Lucas Oil Stadium, Indianapolis, Indiana

- Date: September 7
- Game time: 1:00 p.m. EDT
- Game weather: None (retractable roof closed)
- Game attendance: 64,065
- Referee: Brad Allen
- TV announcers (CBS): Andrew Catalon, Charles Davis, Jason McCourty and A.J Ross
- Recap, Game Book

Game information

**First quarter**

- IND – Spencer Shrader 24-yard field goal, 10:37. Colts 3–0. **Drive: 9 plays, 62 yards, 4:23.**

**Second quarter**

- IND – Michael Pittman Jr. 27-yard pass from Daniel Jones (Spencer Shrader kick), 14:54. Colts 10–0. **Drive: 14 plays, 84 yards, 8:18.**
- IND – Daniel Jones 1-yard run (Spencer Shrader kick), 12:01. Colts 17–0. **Drive: 5 plays, 42 yards, 2:13.**
- IND – Spencer Shrader 35-yard field goal, 0:00. Colts 20–0. **Drive: 17 plays, 72 yards, 6:46.**

**Third quarter**

- IND – Spencer Shrader 28-yard field goal, 7:30. Colts 23–0. **Drive: 7 plays, 48 yards, 3:49.**

**Fourth quarter**

- IND – Daniel Jones 1-yard run (Spencer Shrader kick), 10:14. Colts 30–0. **Drive: 15 plays, 69 yards, 9:16.**
- MIA – De'Von Achane 11-yard pass from Tua Tagovailoa (Tua Tagovailoa–Julian Hill pass), 6:21. Colts 30–8. **Drive: 9 plays, 65 yards, 3:53.**
- IND – Spencer Shrader 48-yard field goal, 2:23. Colts 33–8. **Drive: 7 plays, 21 yards, 3:58.**

**Top passers**

- MIA – Tua Tagovailoa – 14/23, 114 yards, TD, 2 INT
- IND – Daniel Jones – 22/29, 272 yards, TD

**Top rushers**

- MIA – De'Von Achane – 7 rushes, 55 yards
- IND – Jonathan Taylor – 18 rushes, 71 yards

**Top receivers**

- MIA – Tyreek Hill – 4 receptions, 40 yards
- IND – Michael Pittman Jr. – 6 receptions, 80 yards, TD

With the blowout loss (their first Week 1 loss since 2020), the Dolphins started the season 0–1.

==== Week 2: vs. New England Patriots ====
Week 2: New England Patriots at Miami Dolphins – Game summary

Quarter	1	2	3	4	Total
**Patriots**	12	3	8	10	**33**
Dolphins	0	14	6	7	**27**

at Hard Rock Stadium, Miami Gardens, Florida

- Date: September 14
- Game time: 1:00 p.m. EDT
- Game weather: Partly cloudy, 89 °F (32 °C)
- Game attendance: 65,593
- Referee: Alex Moore
- TV announcers (CBS): Andrew Catalon, Charles Davis, Jason McCourty and A.J Ross
- Recap, Game Book

Game information

**First quarter**

- NE – Mack Hollins 8-yard pass from Drake Maye (kick failed), 9:29. Patriots 6–0. **Drive: 10 plays, 68 yards, 5:31.**
- NE – Kayshon Boutte 16-yard pass from Drake Maye (kick failed), 0:49. Patriots 12–0. **Drive: 11 plays, 70 yards, 7:05.**

**Second quarter**

- MIA – Jaylen Waddle 18-yard pass from Tua Tagovailoa (Riley Patterson kick), 11:19. Patriots 12–7. **Drive: 8 plays, 83 yards, 4:30.**
- NE – Andrés Borregales 22-yard field goal, 1:56. Patriots 15–7. **Drive: 15 plays, 71 yards, 9:23.**
- MIA – De'Von Achane 29-yard pass from Tua Tagovailoa (Riley Patterson kick), 0:33. Patriots 15–14. **Drive: 6 plays, 77 yards, 1:23.**

**Third quarter**

- MIA – Riley Patterson 40-yard field goal, 10:41. Dolphins 17–15. **Drive: 7 plays, 49 yards, 4:19.**
- MIA – Riley Patterson 44-yard field goal, 3:37. Dolphins 20–15. **Drive: 9 plays, 30 yards, 5:36.**
- NE – Drake Maye 6-yard run (Rhamondre Stevenson run), 0:06. Patriots 23–20. **Drive: 5 plays, 83 yards, 3:31.**

**Fourth quarter**

- MIA – Malik Washington 74-yard punt return (Riley Patterson kick), 7:18. Dolphins 27–23.
- NE – Antonio Gibson 90-yard kickoff return (Andrés Borregales kick), 7:06. Patriots 30–27.
- NE – Andrés Borregales 53-yard field goal, 1:47. Patriots 33–27. **Drive: 4 plays, 3 yards, 0:25.**

**Top passers**

- NE – Drake Maye – 19/23, 230 yards, 2 TD
- MIA – Tua Tagovailoa – 26/32, 315 yards, 2 TD, INT

**Top rushers**

- NE – Rhamondre Stevenson – 11 rushes, 54 yards
- MIA – De'Von Achane – 11 rushes, 30 yards

**Top receivers**

- NE – Rhamondre Stevenson – 5 receptions, 88 yards
- MIA – Tyreek Hill – 6 receptions, 109 yards

With their first home loss to New England since 2019 (first overall since 2022), the Dolphins fell to 0–2 and 0–1 against the AFC East. This marked quarterback Tua Tagovailoa's first ever loss to the Patriots as their starting quarterback in his career.

==== Week 3: at Buffalo Bills ====
Week 3: Miami Dolphins at Buffalo Bills – Game summary

Quarter	1	2	3	4	Total
Dolphins	7	7	0	7	**21**
**Bills**	7	7	7	10	**31**

at Highmark Stadium, Orchard Park, New York

- Date: September 18
- Game time: 8:15 p.m. EDT
- Game weather: Partly cloudy, 68 °F (20 °C)
- Game attendance: 70,641
- Referee: Alan Eck
- TV announcers (WFOR/Prime Video): Al Michaels, Kirk Herbstreit and Kaylee Hartung
- Recap, Game Book

Game information

**First quarter**

- MIA – Ollie Gordon II 2-yard rush (Riley Patterson kick), 8:31. Dolphins 7–0. **Drive: 10 plays, 47 yards, 6:29.**
- BUF – Dalton Kincaid 20-yard pass from Josh Allen (Matt Prater kick), 4:04. Tied 7–7. **Drive: 7 plays, 85 yards, 4:27.**

**Second quarter**

- BUF – Jackson Hawes 5-yard pass from Josh Allen (Matt Prater kick), 11:54 Bills 14–7. **Drive: 10 plays, 63 yards, 5:30.**
- MIA – Jaylen Waddle 3-yard pass from Tua Tagovailoa (Riley Patterson kick), 0:08. Tied 14–14. **Drive: 16 plays, 71 yards, 5:55.**

**Third quarter**

- BUF – James Cook 2-yard rush (Matt Prater kick), 10:23. Bills 21–14. **Drive: 8 plays, 61 yards, 4:37.**

**Fourth quarter**

- MIA – Tyreek Hill 5-yard pass from Tua Tagovailoa (Riley Patterson kick), 12:18. Tied 21–21. **Drive: 9 plays, 67 yards, 5:40.**
- BUF – Khalil Shakir 15-yard pass from Josh Allen (Matt Prater kick), 7:17. Bills 28–21. **Drive: 9 plays, 65 yards, 5:01.**
- BUF – Matt Prater 48-yard field goal, 0:22. Bills 31–21. **Drive: 6 plays, 29 yards, 2:38.**

**Top passers**

- MIA – Tua Tagovailoa – 23/25, 161 yards, 2 TD, INT
- BUF – Josh Allen – 22/28, 213 yards, 3 TD

**Top rushers**

- MIA – De'Von Achane – 12 rushes, 62 yards
- BUF – James Cook – 19 rushes, 108 yards, TD

**Top receivers**

- MIA – Tyreek Hill – 5 receptions, 49 yards, TD
- BUF – Dalton Kincaid – 5 receptions, 66 yards, TD

With their 7th consecutive loss to the Bills since 2022, the Dolphins dropped to 0–3 on the season.

==== Week 4: vs. New York Jets ====
Week 4: New York Jets at Miami Dolphins – Game summary

Quarter	1	2	3	4	Total
Jets	0	3	7	11	**21**
**Dolphins**	3	7	14	3	**27**

at Hard Rock Stadium, Miami Gardens, Florida

- Date: September 29
- Game time: 7:15 p.m. EDT
- Game weather: Partly cloudy, 86 °F (30 °C)
- Game attendance: 65,848
- Referee: Craig Wrolstad
- TV announcers (ESPN): Chris Fowler, Louis Riddick, Dan Orlovsky, Peter Schrager and Katie George
- Recap, Game Book

Game information

**First quarter**

- MIA – Riley Patterson 47-yard field goal, 10:51. Dolphins 3–0. **Drive: 10 plays, 37 yards, 4:09.**

**Second quarter**

- MIA – Darren Waller 4-yard pass from Tua Tagovailoa (Riley Patterson kick), 9:20. Dolphins 10–0. **Drive: 15 plays, 96 yards, 8:40.**
- NYJ – Nick Folk 58-yard field goal, 0:00. Dolphins 10–3. **Drive: 10 plays, 44 yards, 1:52.**

**Third quarter**

- MIA – Darren Waller 9-yard pass from Tua Tagovailoa (Riley Patterson kick), 11:33. Dolphins 17–3. **Drive: 6 plays, 36 yards, 3:20.**
- NYJ – Justin Fields 43-yard run (Nick Folk kick), 9:23. Dolphins 17–10. **Drive: 4 plays, 52 yards, 2:10.**
- MIA – De'Von Achane 9-yard run (Riley Patterson kick), 5:20. Dolphins 24–10. **Drive: 7 plays, 68 yards, 4:03.**

**Fourth quarter**

- NYJ – Nick Folk 50-yard field goal, 13:09. Dolphins 24–13. **Drive: 6 plays, 31 yards, 3:15.**
- MIA – Riley Patterson 36-yard field goal, 3:33. Dolphins 27–13. **Drive: 8 plays, 56 yards, 3:29.**
- NYJ – Garrett Wilson 23-yard pass from Justin Fields (Justin Fields run), 1:49. Dolphins 27–21. **Drive: 7 plays, 61 yards, 1:44.**

**Top passers**

- NYJ – Justin Fields – 19/26, 198 yards, TD
- MIA – Tua Tagovailoa – 17/25, 177 yards, 2 TD

**Top rushers**

- NYJ – Justin Fields – 7 rushes, 81 yards, TD
- MIA – De'Von Achane – 20 rushes, 99 yards, TD

**Top receivers**

- NYJ – Garrett Wilson – 6 receptions, 82 yards, TD
- MIA – Tyreek Hill – 6 receptions, 67 yards

The Dolphins' first win of the season was marred when Tyreek Hill was lost to a season-ending knee injury early in the third quarter. Nonetheless, this was the Dolphins' tenth consecutive home win over the Jets.

==== Week 5: at Carolina Panthers ====
Week 5: Miami Dolphins at Carolina Panthers – Game summary

Quarter	1	2	3	4	Total
Dolphins	3	14	0	7	**24**
**Panthers**	0	10	3	14	**27**

at Bank of America Stadium, Charlotte, North Carolina

- Date: October 5
- Game time: 1:00 p.m. EDT
- Game weather: Mostly cloudy, 77 °F (25 °C)
- Game attendance: 72,301
- Referee: Clay Martin
- TV announcers (Fox): Eric Collins, Mark Schlereth and Jen Hale
- Recap, Game Book

Game information

**First quarter**

- MIA – Riley Patterson 43-yard field goal, 9:03. Dolphins 3–0. **Drive: 11 plays, 48 yards, 5:57.**

**Second quarter**

- MIA – De'Von Achane 10-yard pass from Tua Tagovailoa (Riley Patterson kick), 14:55. Dolphins 10–0. **Drive: 14 plays, 58 yards, 6:36.**
- MIA – Darren Waller 4-yard pass from Tua Tagovailoa (Riley Patterson kick), 10:48. Dolphins 17–0. **Drive: 5 plays, 49 yards, 3:13.**
- CAR – Xavier Legette 7-yard pass from Bryce Young (Ryan Fitzgerald kick), 3:24. Dolphins 17–7. **Drive: 12 plays, 76 yards, 7:24.**
- CAR – Ryan Fitzgerald 35-yard field goal, 0:00. Dolphins 17–10. **Drive: 11 plays, 59 yards, 1:47.**

**Third quarter**

- CAR – Ryan Fitzgerald 49-yard field goal, 12:15. Dolphins 17–13. **Drive: 5 plays, 39 yards, 2:45.**

**Fourth quarter**

- CAR – Rico Dowdle 1-yard run (Ryan Fitzgerald kick), 6:10. Panthers 20–17. **Drive: 7 plays, 85 yards, 4:02.**
- MIA – Jaylen Waddle 46-yard pass from Tua Tagovailoa (Riley Patterson kick), 4:42. Dolphins 24–20. **Drive: 3 plays, 57 yards, 1:28.**
- CAR – Mitchell Evans 4-yard pass from Bryce Young (Ryan Fitzgerald kick), 1:59. Panthers 27–24. **Drive: 8 plays, 83 yards, 2:43.**

**Top passers**

- MIA – Tua Tagovailoa – 27/36, 256 yards, 3 TD
- CAR – Bryce Young – 19/30, 198 yards, 2 TD, INT

**Top rushers**

- MIA – De'Von Achane – 10 rushes, 16 yards
- CAR – Rico Dowdle – 23 rushes, 206 yards, TD

**Top receivers**

- MIA – Jaylen Waddle – 6 receptions, 110 yards, TD
- CAR – Tetairoa McMillan – 6 receptions, 73 yards

The Dolphins blew a 17–0 lead and lost to Bryce Young and the Panthers, 27–24. Miami was also notably outgained 239–19 on the ground in this game, resulting in the Dolphins falling to 1–4.

==== Week 6: vs. Los Angeles Chargers ====
Week 6: Los Angeles Chargers at Miami Dolphins – Game summary

Quarter	1	2	3	4	Total
**Chargers**	6	3	14	6	**29**
Dolphins	7	6	0	14	**27**

at Hard Rock Stadium, Miami Gardens, Florida

- Date: October 12
- Game time: 1:00 p.m. EDT
- Game weather: Partly cloudy, 85 °F (29 °C)
- Game attendance: 65,592
- Referee: Bill Vinovich
- TV announcers (CBS): Andrew Catalon, Charles Davis, Jason McCourty and A.J Ross
- Recap, Game Book

Game information

**First quarter**

- LAC – Cameron Dicker 35-yard field goal, 7:52. Chargers 3–0. **Drive: 11 plays, 42 yards, 6:14.**
- MIA – De'Von Achane 49-yard run (Riley Patterson kick), 4:03. Dolphins 7–3. **Drive: 1 play, 49 yards, 0:08.**
- LAC – Cameron Dicker 31-yard field goal, 0:35. Dolphins 7–6. **Drive: 7 plays, 55 yards, 3:28.**

**Second quarter**

- LAC – Cameron Dicker 29-yard field goal, 8:39. Chargers 9–7. **Drive: 6 plays, 42 yards, 3:18.**
- MIA – Riley Patterson 47-yard field goal, 4:30. Dolphins 10–9. **Drive: 8 plays, 36 yards, 4:09.**
- MIA – Riley Patterson 27-yard field goal, 0:00. Dolphins 13–9. **Drive: 9 plays, 73 yards, 1:38.**

**Third quarter**

- LAC – Ladd McConkey 5-yard pass from Justin Herbert (Cameron Dicker kick), 7:26. Chargers 16–13. **Drive: 13 plays, 72 yards, 7:34.**
- LAC – Kimani Vidal 7-yard pass from Justin Herbert (Cameron Dicker kick), 3:55. Chargers 23–13. **Drive: 4 plays, 37 yards, 1:59.**

**Fourth quarter**

- LAC – Cameron Dicker 35-yard field goal, 12:47. Chargers 26–13. **Drive: 9 plays, 62 yards, 4:34.**
- MIA – De'Von Achane 4-yard run (Riley Patterson kick), 7:56. Chargers 26–20. **Drive: 9 plays, 69 yards, 4:51.**
- MIA – Darren Waller 7-yard pass from Tua Tagovailoa (Riley Patterson kick), 0:46. Dolphins 27–26. **Drive: 13 plays, 82 yards, 5:33.**
- LAC – Cameron Dicker 33-yard field goal, 0:05. Chargers 29–27. **Drive: 6 plays, 44 yards, 0:41.**

**Top passers**

- LAC – Justin Herbert – 29/38, 264 yards, 2 TD
- MIA – Tua Tagovailoa – 21/32, 205 yards, TD, 3 INT

**Top rushers**

- LAC – Kimani Vidal – 18 rushes, 124 yards
- MIA – De'Von Achane – 16 rushes, 128 yards, 2 TD

**Top receivers**

- LAC – Ladd McConkey – 7 receptions, 100 yards, TD
- MIA – Jaylen Waddle – 6 receptions, 95 yards

The Dolphins overcame a 26–13 fourth-quarter deficit to take a 27–26 lead with 46 seconds remaining. However, they allowed Justin Herbert to connect on a 42-yard pass to wide receiver Ladd McConkey, which set up a game-winning 33-yard field goal. With the loss, the Dolphins fell to 1–5. It marked their worst start since 2021.

Following the game, quarterback Tua Tagovailoa made comments that publicly called out his teammates, drawing widespread scrutiny from former NFL players and analysts.

==== Week 7: at Cleveland Browns ====
Week 7: Miami Dolphins at Cleveland Browns – Game summary

Quarter	1	2	3	4	Total
Dolphins	0	6	0	0	**6**
**Browns**	3	14	7	7	**31**

at Huntington Bank Field, Cleveland, Ohio

- Date: October 19
- Game time: 1:00 p.m. EDT
- Game weather: Rain, 65 °F (18 °C)
- Game attendance: 63,762
- Referee: Shawn Hochuli
- TV announcers (CBS): Spero Dedes, Adam Archuleta and Aditi Kinkhabwala
- Recap, Game Book

Game information

**First quarter**

- CLE – Andre Szmyt 30-yard field goal, 2:17. Browns 3–0. **Drive: 11 plays, 57 yards, 6:43.**

**Second quarter**

- MIA – Riley Patterson 33-yard field goal, 14:14. Tied 3–3. **Drive: 6 plays, 62 yards, 3:03.**
- CLE – Quinshon Judkins 46-yard run (Andre Szmyt kick), 11:19. Browns 10–3. **Drive: 5 plays, 83 yards, 2:55.**
- CLE – Quinshon Judkins 3-yard run (Andre Szmyt kick), 6:03. Browns 17–3. **Drive: 10 plays, 46 yards, 5:10.**
- MIA – Riley Patterson 26-yard field goal, 0:00. Browns 17–6. **Drive: 9 plays, 32 yards, 2:53.**

**Third quarter**

- CLE – Tyson Campbell 34-yard interception return (Andre Szmyt kick), 14:48. Browns 24–6.

**Fourth quarter**

- CLE – Quinshon Judkins 2-yard run (Andre Szmyt kick), 10:56. Browns 31–6. **Drive: 1 play, 2 yards, 0:03.**

**Top passers**

- MIA – Tua Tagovailoa – 12/23, 100 yards, 3 INT
- CLE – Dillon Gabriel – 13/18, 116 yards

**Top rushers**

- MIA – De'Von Achane – 13 rushes, 82 yards
- CLE – Quinshon Judkins – 25 rushes, 84 yards, 3 TD

**Top receivers**

- MIA – Dee Eskridge – 2 receptions, 45 yards
- CLE – Harold Fannin Jr. – 4 receptions, 36 yards

With the embarrassing loss, the Dolphins drop to 1–6 and 0–1 against the AFC North.

==== Week 8: at Atlanta Falcons ====
Week 8: Miami Dolphins at Atlanta Falcons – Game summary

Quarter	1	2	3	4	Total
**Dolphins**	7	10	7	10	**34**
Falcons	0	3	0	7	**10**

at Mercedes-Benz Stadium, Atlanta, Georgia

- Date: October 26
- Game time: 1:00 p.m. EDT
- Game weather: None (retractable roof closed)
- Game attendance: 71,344
- Referee: John Hussey
- TV announcers (CBS): Kevin Harlan, Trent Green and Melanie Collins
- Recap, Game Book

Game information

**First quarter**

- MIA – De'Von Achane 3-yard pass from Tua Tagovailoa (Riley Patterson kick), 2:33. Dolphins 7–0. **Drive: 13 plays, 79 yards, 8:33.**

**Second quarter**

- ATL – Parker Romo 45-yard field goal, 12:59. Dolphins 7–3. **Drive: 9 plays, 43 yards, 4:34.**
- MIA – Riley Patterson 34-yard field goal, 6:14. Dolphins 10–3. **Drive: 5 plays, 25 yards, 2:16.**
- MIA – Malik Washington 9-yard pass from Tua Tagovailoa (Riley Patterson kick), 0:11. Dolphins 17–3. **Drive: 10 plays, 82 yards, 4:29.**

**Third quarter**

- MIA – Jaylen Waddle 43-yard pass from Tua Tagovailoa (Riley Patterson kick), 4:18. Dolphins 24–3. **Drive: 10 plays, 84 yards, 6:05.**

**Fourth quarter**

- MIA – Ollie Gordon II 20-yard pass from Tua Tagovailoa (Riley Patterson kick), 13:28. Dolphins 31–3. **Drive: 7 plays, 41 yards, 4:06.**
- MIA – Riley Patterson 36-yard field goal, 8:36. Dolphins 34–3. **Drive: 5 plays, 20 yards, 2:20.**
- ATL – Tyler Allgeier 6-yard run (Parker Romo kick), 5:01. Dolphins 34–10. **Drive: 11 plays, 65 yards, 3:35.**

**Top passers**

- MIA – Tua Tagovailoa – 20/26, 205 yards, 4 TD
- ATL – Kirk Cousins – 21/31, 173 yards

**Top rushers**

- MIA – De'Von Achane – 18 rushes, 67 yards
- ATL – Bijan Robinson – 9 rushes, 25 yards

**Top receivers**

- MIA – Jaylen Waddle – 5 receptions, 99 yards, TD
- ATL – Kyle Pitts – 9 receptions, 59 yards

Despite entering the game as touchdown underdogs, the Dolphins dominated the Falcons in a big upset victory. The Dolphins improved to 2–6 and 1–1 against the NFC South.

==== Week 9: vs. Baltimore Ravens ====
Week 9: Baltimore Ravens at Miami Dolphins – Game summary

Quarter	1	2	3	4	Total
**Ravens**	7	7	14	0	**28**
Dolphins	3	3	0	0	**6**

at Hard Rock Stadium, Miami Gardens, Florida

- Date: October 30
- Game time: 8:15 p.m. EDT
- Game weather: Clear, 73 °F (23 °C)
- Game attendance: 66,132
- Referee: Scott Novak
- TV announcers (Prime Video): Al Michaels, Kirk Herbstreit and Kaylee Hartung
- Recap, Game Book

Game information

**First quarter**

- MIA – Riley Patterson 49-yard field goal, 12:07. Dolphins 3–0. **Drive: 5 plays, 26 yards, 2:53.**
- BAL – Mark Andrews 2-yard pass from Lamar Jackson (Tyler Loop kick), 8:25. Ravens 7–3. **Drive: 4 plays, 7 yards, 1:10.**

**Second quarter**

- BAL – Mark Andrews 20-yard pass from Lamar Jackson (Tyler Loop kick), 14:10. Ravens 14–3. **Drive: 7 plays, 75 yards, 3:26.**
- MIA – Riley Patterson 43-yard field goal, 7:57. Ravens 14–6. **Drive: 4 plays, 4 yards, 0:52.**

**Third quarter**

- BAL – Charlie Kolar 3-yard pass from Lamar Jackson (Tyler Loop kick), 8:09. Ravens 21–6. **Drive: 11 plays, 68 yards, 6:51.**
- BAL – Rashod Bateman 9-yard pass from Lamar Jackson (Tyler Loop kick), 4:15. Ravens 28–6. **Drive: 4 plays, 60 yards, 2:08.**

**Fourth quarter**

- No scoring plays

**Top passers**

- BAL – Lamar Jackson – 18/23, 204 yards, 4 TD
- MIA – Tua Tagovailoa – 25/40, 261 yards, INT

**Top rushers**

- BAL – Derrick Henry – 19 rushes, 119 yards
- MIA – De'Von Achane – 14 rushes, 67 yards

**Top receivers**

- BAL – Zay Flowers – 5 receptions, 64 yards
- MIA – Jaylen Waddle – 6 receptions, 82 yards

The Dolphins turned in another disappointing performance and lost 28–6 to Lamar Jackson and the Ravens. This dropped Miami to 2–7 and 0–2 against the AFC North.

The next day, the Dolphins announced that general manager Chris Grier and the team had mutually agreed to part ways. Grier, who had been with the organization since 2000 and served as general manager since 2016, finished his tenure with Miami with five winning seasons and three playoff appearances, but no postseason victories.

==== Week 10: vs. Buffalo Bills ====
Week 10: Buffalo Bills at Miami Dolphins – Game summary

Quarter	1	2	3	4	Total
Bills	0	0	0	13	**13**
**Dolphins**	7	9	0	14	**30**

at Hard Rock Stadium, Miami Gardens, Florida

- Date: November 9
- Game time: 1:00 p.m. EST
- Game weather: Partly cloudy, 84 °F (29 °C)
- Game attendance: 66,030
- Referee: Ron Torbert
- TV announcers (CBS): Andrew Catalon, Charles Davis, Jason McCourty and AJ Ross
- Recap, Game Book

Game information

**First quarter**

- MIA – Malik Washington 9-yard pass from Tua Tagovailoa (Riley Patterson kick), 4:49. Dolphins 7–0. **Drive: 12 plays, 92 yards, 7:27.**

**Second quarter**

- MIA – Jaylen Waddle 38-yard pass from Tua Tagovailoa (kick failed), 14:52. Dolphins 13–0. **Drive: 3 plays, 51 yards, 1:24.**
- MIA – Riley Patterson 46-yard field goal, 3:03. Dolphins 16–0. **Drive: 10 plays, 67 yards, 5:59.**

**Third quarter**

- No scoring plays

**Fourth quarter**

- BUF – Keon Coleman 35-yard pass from Josh Allen (pass failed), 12:36. Dolphins 16–6. **Drive: 8 plays, 98 yards, 4:24.**
- MIA – De'Von Achane 59-yard run (Riley Patterson kick), 6:31. Dolphins 23–6. **Drive: 2 plays, 62 yards, 0:39.**
- BUF – Jackson Hawes 26-yard pass from Josh Allen (Matt Prater kick), 3:36. Dolphins 23–13. **Drive: 11 plays, 65 yards, 2:55.**
- MIA – De'Von Achane 35-yard run (Riley Patterson kick), 3:17. Dolphins 30–13. **Drive: 3 plays, 37 yards, 0:19.**

**Top passers**

- BUF – Josh Allen – 28/40, 306 yards, 2 TD, INT
- MIA – Tua Tagovailoa – 15/21, 173 yards, 2 TD, 2 INT

**Top rushers**

- BUF – James Cook – 13 rushes, 53 yards
- MIA – De'Von Achane – 22 rushes, 174 yards, 2 TD

**Top receivers**

- BUF – Khalil Shakir – 7 receptions, 58 yards
- MIA – Jaylen Waddle – 5 receptions, 84 yards, TD

Although the Bills entered the game as more than touchdown favorites (-8.5), the Dolphins crushed them, blowing the game open and snapping their seven-game losing streak to Buffalo. This was Miami's first win over the Bills since Week 3 of the 2022 season.

==== Week 11: vs. Washington Commanders ====
NFL International Series

Week 11: Washington Commanders at Miami Dolphins – Game summary

Quarter	1	2	3	4	OT	Total
Commanders	3	3	7	0	0	**13**
**Dolphins**	3	3	0	7	3	**16**

at Santiago Bernabéu Stadium, Madrid, Spain

- Date: November 16
- Game time: 3:30 p.m. CET/9:30 a.m. EST
- Game weather: None (retractable roof closed)
- Game attendance: 78,610
- Referee: Shawn Smith
- TV announcers (WFOR/NFLN): Kenny Albert, Jonathan Vilma and Jamie Erdahl
- Recap, Game Book

Game information

**First quarter**

- MIA – Riley Patterson 46-yard field goal, 10:35. Dolphins 3–0. **Drive: 7 plays, 52 yards, 4:25.**
- WAS – Matt Gay 26-yard field goal, 2:36. Tied 3–3. **Drive: 13 plays, 71 yards, 7:59.**

**Second quarter**

- MIA – Riley Patterson 39-yard field goal, 11:27. Dolphins 6–3. **Drive: 11 plays, 56 yards, 6:09.**
- WAS – Matt Gay 30-yard field goal, 0:00. Tied 6–6. **Drive: 14 plays, 82 yards, 5:37.**

**Third quarter**

- WAS – Deebo Samuel 20-yard pass from Marcus Mariota (Matt Gay kick), 11:24. Commanders 13–6. **Drive: 6 plays, 59 yards, 3:36.**

**Fourth quarter**

- MIA – Ollie Gordon II 1-yard run (Riley Patterson kick), 12:36. Tied 13–13. **Drive: 10 plays, 53 yards, 5:13.**

**Overtime**

- MIA – Riley Patterson 29-yard field goal, 7:33. Dolphins 16–13. **Drive: 4 plays, 22 yards, 2:20.**

**Top passers**

- WAS – Marcus Mariota – 20/30, 213 yards, TD, INT
- MIA – Tua Tagovailoa – 14/20, 171 yards

**Top rushers**

- WAS – Chris Rodriguez Jr. – 15 rushes, 79 yards
- MIA – De'Von Achane – 21 rushes, 120 yards

**Top receivers**

- WAS – Deebo Samuel – 7 receptions, 74 yards, TD
- MIA – Jaylen Waddle – 3 receptions, 52 yards

The Dolphins and Commanders played in Madrid in the first NFL regular season game held in Spain as part of the NFL International Series.

On the first play of overtime, Commanders quarterback Marcus Mariota threw an interception to Jack Jones, which set up a game-winning 29-yard field goal by Riley Patterson.

With their fourth win in their last 5 games against Washington since 2011, the Dolphins improved to 4–7 entering their bye.

==== Week 13: vs. New Orleans Saints ====
Week 13: New Orleans Saints at Miami Dolphins – Game summary

Quarter	1	2	3	4	Total
Saints	0	0	8	9	**17**
**Dolphins**	7	9	0	5	**21**

at Hard Rock Stadium, Miami Gardens, Florida

- Date: November 30
- Game time: 1:00 p.m. EST
- Game weather: Cloudy, 76 °F (24 °C)
- Game attendance: 63,864
- Referee: Alan Eck
- TV announcers (Fox): Chris Myers, Mark Schlereth and Jen Hale
- Recap, Game Book

Game information

**First quarter**

- MIA – De'Von Achane 29-yard run (Riley Patterson kick), 11:19. Dolphins 7–0. **Drive: 6 plays, 69 yards, 3:41.**

**Second quarter**

- MIA – Riley Patterson 39-yard field goal, 14:09. Dolphins 10–0. **Drive: 8 plays, 68 yards, 2:52.**
- MIA – Riley Patterson 25-yard field goal, 6:07. Dolphins 13–0. **Drive: 10 plays, 44 yards, 5:28.**
- MIA – Riley Patterson 48-yard field goal, 0:00. Dolphins 16–0. **Drive: 5 plays, 13 yards, 1:08.**

**Third quarter**

- NO – Chris Olave 17-yard pass from Tyler Shough (Tyler Shough run), 10:40. Dolphins 16–8. **Drive: 10 plays, 65 yards, 4:20.**

**Fourth quarter**

- MIA – Riley Patterson 33-yard field goal, 9:39. Dolphins 19–8. **Drive: 9 plays, 38 yards, 3:45.**
- NO – Charlie Smyth 56-yard field goal, 6:08. Dolphins 19–11. **Drive: 10 plays, 37 yards, 3:31.**
- NO – Devaughn Vele 15-yard pass from Tyler Shough (pass failed), 1:17. Dolphins 19–17. **Drive: 7 plays, 55 yards, 1:46.**
- MIA – Minkah Fitzpatrick interception return, 1:17. Dolphins 21–17.

**Top passers**

- NO – Tyler Shough – 26/38, 239 yards, 2 TD, INT
- MIA – Tua Tagovailoa – 12/23, 157 yards, INT

**Top rushers**

- NO – Devin Neal – 14 rushes, 47 yards
- MIA – De'Von Achane – 22 rushes, 134 yards, TD

**Top receivers**

- NO – Devaughn Vele – 8 receptions, 93 yards, TD
- MIA – Darren Waller – 2 receptions, 47 yards

With their first home win against the Saints since 1998, the Dolphins improved to 5–7 and 2–1 against the NFC South.

==== Week 14: at New York Jets ====
Week 14: Miami Dolphins at New York Jets – Game summary

Quarter	1	2	3	4	Total
**Dolphins**	21	3	0	10	**34**
Jets	7	0	0	3	**10**

at MetLife Stadium, East Rutherford, New Jersey

- Date: December 7
- Game time: 1:00 p.m. EST
- Game weather: Cloudy, 41 °F (5 °C)
- Game attendance: 68,625
- Referee: Bill Vinovich
- TV announcers (CBS): Spero Dedes, Adam Archuleta and Aditi Kinkhabwala
- Recap, Game Book

Game information

**First quarter**

- MIA – Jaylen Waddle 3-yard pass from Tua Tagovailoa (Riley Patterson kick), 12:46. Dolphins 7–0. **Drive: 4 plays, 69 yards, 2:14.**
- MIA – De'Von Achane 13-yard run (Riley Patterson kick), 8:48. Dolphins 14–0. **Drive: 5 plays, 80 yards, 2:56.**
- MIA – Jaylen Wright 2-yard run (Riley Patterson kick), 3:39. Dolphins 21–0. **Drive: 6 plays, 29 yards, 3:48.**
- NYJ – Isaiah Williams 78-yard punt return (Nick Folk kick), 0:20. Dolphins 21–7.

**Second quarter**

- MIA – Riley Patterson 43-yard field goal, 1:56. Dolphins 24–7. **Drive: 7 plays, 55 yards, 5:14.**

**Third quarter**

- No scoring plays

**Fourth quarter**

- NYJ – Nick Folk 31-yard field goal, 12:13. Dolphins 24–10. **Drive: 12 plays, 65 yards, 5:25.**
- MIA – Ollie Gordon II 7-yard run (Riley Patterson kick), 6:18. Dolphins 31–10. **Drive: 9 plays, 67 yards, 5:55.**
- MIA – Riley Patterson 53-yard field goal, 2:24. Dolphins 34–10. **Drive: 6 plays, 7 yards, 2:06.**

**Top passers**

- MIA – Tua Tagovailoa – 13/21, 127 yards, TD
- NYJ – Brady Cook – 14/30, 163 yards, 2 INT

**Top rushers**

- MIA – Jaylen Wright – 24 rushes, 107 yards, TD
- NYJ – Breece Hall – 14 rushes, 43 yards

**Top receivers**

- MIA – Jaylen Waddle – 5 receptions, 50 yards, TD
- NYJ – Mason Taylor – 5 receptions, 51 yards

Tua Tagovailoa recorded his first career win in a game with a kickoff temperature of 46 degrees or colder, as the kickoff temperature was 41 degrees.

==== Week 15: at Pittsburgh Steelers ====
Week 15: Miami Dolphins at Pittsburgh Steelers – Game summary

Quarter	1	2	3	4	Total
Dolphins	0	3	0	12	**15**
**Steelers**	0	7	14	7	**28**

at Acrisure Stadium, Pittsburgh, Pennsylvania

- Date: December 15
- Game time: 8:15 p.m. EST
- Game weather: Cloudy, 17 °F (−8 °C)
- Game attendance: 65,663
- Referee: Land Clark
- TV announcers (WFOR/ESPN): Joe Buck, Troy Aikman, Lisa Salters and Laura Rutledge
- Recap, Game Book

Game information

**First quarter**

- No scoring plays

**Second quarter**

- MIA – Riley Patterson 54-yard field goal, 5:11. Dolphins 3–0. **Drive: 7 plays, 33 yards, 3:24.**
- PIT – Connor Heyward 1-yard run (Chris Boswell kick), 0:17. Steelers 7–3. **Drive: 12 plays, 60 yards, 4:54.**

**Third quarter**

- PIT – Marquez Valdes-Scantling 19-yard pass from Aaron Rodgers (Chris Boswell kick), 11:20. Steelers 14–3. **Drive: 6 plays, 71 yards, 3:40.**
- PIT – DK Metcalf 28-yard pass from Aaron Rodgers (Chris Boswell kick), 4:58. Steelers 21–3. **Drive: 10 plays, 77 yards, 4:08.**

**Fourth quarter**

- PIT – Jonnu Smith 14-yard run (Chris Boswell kick), 13:01. Steelers 28–3. **Drive: 9 plays, 81 yards, 5:11.**
- MIA – Darren Waller 6-yard pass from Tua Tagovailoa (pass failed), 9:41. Steelers 28–9. **Drive: 6 plays, 65 yards, 3:20.**
- MIA – Darren Waller 13-yard pass from Tua Tagovailoa (pass failed), 2:32. Steelers 28–15. **Drive: 9 plays, 86 yards, 4:51.**

**Top passers**

- MIA – Tua Tagovailoa – 22/28, 253 yards, 2 TD, INT
- PIT – Aaron Rodgers – 23/27, 224 yards, 2 TD

**Top rushers**

- MIA – De'Von Achane – 12 rushes, 60 yards
- PIT – Kenneth Gainwell – 13 rushes, 80 yards

**Top receivers**

- MIA – De'Von Achane – 6 receptions, 67 yards
- PIT – DK Metcalf – 3 receptions, 55 yards, TD

With the loss, the Dolphins fell to 6–8 (0–3 against the AFC North) and they were eliminated from playoff contention.

Two days later, the Dolphins announced that Tua Tagovailoa would be benched following his struggles, with rookie Quinn Ewers named as the starting quarterback.

==== Week 16: vs. Cincinnati Bengals ====
Week 16: Cincinnati Bengals at Miami Dolphins – Game summary

Quarter	1	2	3	4	Total
**Bengals**	7	10	21	7	**45**
Dolphins	7	7	0	7	**21**

at Hard Rock Stadium, Miami Gardens, Florida

- Date: December 21
- Game time: 1:00 p.m. EST
- Game weather: Partly cloudy, 81 °F (27 °C)
- Game attendance: 65,885
- Referee: John Hussey
- TV announcers (CBS): Spero Dedes, Adam Archuleta and Aditi Kinkhabwala
- Recap Game Book

Game information

**First quarter**

- CIN – Tee Higgins 9-yard pass from Joe Burrow (Evan McPherson kick), 3:57. Bengals 7–0. **Drive: 7 plays, 91 yards, 4:01.**
- MIA – De'Von Achane 48-yard run (Riley Patterson kick), 2:25. Tied 7–7. **Drive: 3 plays, 65 yards, 1:32.**

**Second quarter**

- CIN – Evan McPherson 45-yard field goal, 6:01. Bengals 10–7. **Drive: 11 plays, 53 yards, 5:42.**
- MIA – Malik Washington 9-yard run (Riley Patterson kick), 2:24. Dolphins 14–10. **Drive: 7 plays, 68 yards, 3:37.**
- CIN – Samaje Perine 4-yard run (Evan McPherson kick), 1:24. Bengals 17–14. **Drive: 7 plays, 56 yards, 1:00.**

**Third quarter**

- CIN – Chase Brown 9-yard pass from Joe Burrow (Evan McPherson kick), 9:43. Bengals 24–14. **Drive: 6 plays, 34 yards, 3:19.**
- CIN – Chase Brown 12-yard run (Evan McPherson kick), 8:32. Bengals 31–14. **Drive: 2 plays, 35 yards, 0:47.**
- CIN – Chase Brown 5-yard pass from Joe Burrow (Evan McPherson kick), 2:25. Bengals 38–14. **Drive: 6 plays, 53 yards, 2:54.**

**Fourth quarter**

- CIN – Mike Gesicki 17-yard pass from Joe Burrow (Evan McPherson kick), 13:32. Bengals 45–14. **Drive: 7 plays, 52 yards, 3:40.**
- MIA – Jaylen Wright 3-yard run (Riley Patterson kick), 3:43. Bengals 45–21. **Drive: 9 plays, 97 yards, 5:27.**

**Top passers**

- CIN – Joe Burrow – 25/32, 309 yards, 4 TD
- MIA – Quinn Ewers – 20/30, 260 yards, 2 INT

**Top rushers**

- CIN – Chase Brown – 12 rushes, 66 yards, TD
- MIA – De'Von Achane – 15 rushes, 81 yards, TD

**Top receivers**

- CIN – Ja'Marr Chase – 9 receptions, 109 yards
- MIA – Jaylen Waddle – 5 receptions, 72 yards

With the loss, Miami secured their second straight losing season as they fell to 6–9 and they were the only AFC East team that was swept by the AFC North.

==== Week 17: vs. Tampa Bay Buccaneers ====
Week 17: Tampa Bay Buccaneers at Miami Dolphins – Game summary

Quarter	1	2	3	4	Total
Buccaneers	7	0	3	7	**17**
**Dolphins**	7	10	0	3	**20**

at Hard Rock Stadium, Miami Gardens, Florida

- Date: December 28
- Game time: 1:00 p.m. EST
- Game weather: Sunny, 80 °F (27 °C)
- Game attendance: 66,552
- Referee: Scott Novak
- TV announcers (Fox): Kenny Albert, Jonathan Vilma and Jen Hale
- Recap, Game Book

Game information

**First quarter**

- TB – Chris Godwin 5-yard pass from Baker Mayfield (Chase McLaughlin kick), 5:27. Buccaneers 7–0. **Drive: 14 plays, 68 yards, 7:27.**
- MIA – Theo Wease Jr. 63-yard pass from Quinn Ewers (Riley Patterson kick), 4:29. Tied 7–7. **Drive: 3 plays, 65 yards, 0:58.**

**Second quarter**

- MIA – Riley Patterson 29-yard field goal, 8:18. Dolphins 10–7. **Drive: 10 plays, 76 yards, 5:41.**
- MIA – Greg Dulcich 11-yard pass from Quinn Ewers (Riley Patterson kick), 1:43. Dolphins 17–7. **Drive: 9 plays, 76 yards, 4:14.**

**Third quarter**

- TB – Chase McLaughlin 33-yard field goal, 3:49. Dolphins 17–10. **Drive: 13 plays, 50 yards, 8:06.**

**Fourth quarter**

- MIA – Riley Patterson 31-yard field goal, 14:15. Dolphins 20–10. **Drive: 8 plays, 32 yards, 4:34.**
- TB – Mike Evans 4-yard pass from Baker Mayfield (Chase McLaughlin kick), 0:50. Dolphins 20–17. **Drive: 3 plays, 91 yards, 1:00.**

**Top passers**

- TB – Baker Mayfield – 33/44, 346 yards, 2 TD, 2 INT
- MIA – Quinn Ewers – 14/22, 172 yards, 2 TD

**Top rushers**

- TB – Bucky Irving – 9 rushes, 19 yards
- MIA – De'Von Achane – 18 rushes, 83 yards

**Top receivers**

- TB – Jalen McMillan – 7 receptions, 114 yards
- MIA – Theo Wease Jr. – 1 reception, 63 yards, TD

With their first win against the Buccaneers since 2009, the Dolphins improved to 7–9, finishing 3–1 against the NFC South (4–1 against the NFC) and 5–4 at home.

==== Week 18: at New England Patriots ====
Week 18: Miami Dolphins at New England Patriots – Game summary

Quarter	1	2	3	4	Total
Dolphins	0	10	0	0	**10**
**Patriots**	14	3	14	7	**38**

at Gillette Stadium, Foxborough, Massachusetts

- Date: January 4
- Game time: 4:25 p.m. EST
- Game weather: Partly cloudy, 29 °F (−2 °C)
- Game attendance: 64,628
- Referee: Clay Martin
- TV announcers (Fox): Joe Davis, Greg Olsen and Pam Oliver
- Recap, Game Book

Game information

**First quarter**

- NE – TreVeyon Henderson 5-yard run (Andres Borregales kick), 13:14. Patriots 7–0. **Drive: 3 plays, 70 yards, 1:46.**
- NE – Rhamondre Stevenson 2-yard run (Andres Borregales kick), 0:55. Patriots 14–0. **Drive: 9 plays, 92 yards, 4:55.**

**Second quarter**

- MIA – Malik Washington 2-yard pass from Quinn Ewers (Riley Patterson kick), 10:14. Patriots 14–7. **Drive: 10 plays, 65 yards, 5:41.**
- MIA – Riley Patterson 52-yard field goal, 0:28. Patriots 14–10. **Drive: 4 plays, 6 yards, 1:03.**
- NE – Andres Borregales 59-yard field goal, 0:00. Patriots 17–10. **Drive: 4 plays, 27 yards, 0:28.**

**Third quarter**

- NE – Rhamondre Stevenson 15-yard pass from Drake Maye (Andres Borregales kick), 7:30. Patriots 24–10. **Drive: 7 plays, 80 yards, 4:08.**
- NE – Rhamondre Stevenson 35-yard run (Andres Borregales kick), 2:18. Patriots 31–10. **Drive: 4 plays, 63 yards, 2:06.**

**Fourth quarter**

- NE – TreVeyon Henderson 2-yard run (Andres Borregales kick), 12:39. Patriots 38–10. **Drive: 5 plays, 51 yards, 3:00.**

**Top passers**

- MIA – Quinn Ewers – 16/23, 137 yards, TD, INT
- NE – Drake Maye – 14/18, 191 yards, TD

**Top rushers**

- MIA – Jaylen Wright – 13 rushes, 23 yards
- NE – Rhamondre Stevenson – 7 rushes, 131 yards, 2 TD

**Top receivers**

- MIA – Theo Wease Jr. – 3 receptions, 44 yards
- NE – Hunter Henry – 5 receptions, 56 yards

With the loss, the Dolphins were swept by the Patriots for the first time since 2016, and finished the season 7–10 (3–3 against the AFC East) and 2–6 on the road. Head Coach Mike McDaniel was fired four days after.

=== Standings ===
==== Division ====
AFC East
	W	L	T	PCT	DIV	CONF	PF	PA	STK
^{(2)} New England Patriots	14	3	0	.824	5–1	9–3	490	320	W3
^{(6)} Buffalo Bills	12	5	0	.706	4–2	9–3	481	365	W1
Miami Dolphins	7	10	0	.412	3–3	3–9	347	424	L1
New York Jets	3	14	0	.176	0–6	2–10	300	503	L5

==== Conference ====
AFC
Seed	Team	Division	W	L	T	PCT	DIV	CONF	SOS	SOV	STK
**Division leaders**
1 (Note: Denver finished ahead of New England based on common games (Denver 6–0 to New England 5–1 against: Cincinnati, Las Vegas, NY Giants, NY Jets and Tennessee).)	Denver Broncos	West	14	3	0	.824	5–1	9–3	.422	.378	W2
2	New England Patriots	East	14	3	0	.824	5–1	9–3	.391	.370	W3
3	Jacksonville Jaguars	South	13	4	0	.765	5–1	10–2	.478	.425	W8
4	Pittsburgh Steelers	North	10	7	0	.588	4–2	8–4	.503	.453	W1
**Wild cards**
5 (Note: Houston finished ahead of Buffalo based on head-to-head victory.)	Houston Texans	South	12	5	0	.706	5–1	10–2	.522	.441	W9
6	Buffalo Bills	East	12	5	0	.706	4–2	9–3	.471	.412	W1
7	Los Angeles Chargers	West	11	6	0	.647	5–1	8–4	.469	.425	L2
**Did not qualify for the postseason**
8 (Note: Indianapolis finished ahead of Baltimore based on conference record (Indianapolis 6–6 to Baltimore 5–7).)	Indianapolis Colts	South	8	9	0	.471	2–4	6–6	.540	.382	L7
9	Baltimore Ravens	North	8	9	0	.471	3–3	5–7	.507	.408	L1
10	Miami Dolphins	East	7	10	0	.412	3–3	3–9	.488	.378	L1
11 (Note: Cincinnati finished ahead of Kansas City based on conference record (Cincinnati 5–7 to Kansas City 3–9).)	Cincinnati Bengals	North	6	11	0	.353	3–3	5–7	.521	.451	L1
12	Kansas City Chiefs	West	6	11	0	.353	1–5	3–9	.514	.363	L6
13	Cleveland Browns	North	5	12	0	.294	2–4	4–8	.486	.418	W2
14 (Note: Las Vegas finished ahead of NY Jets and Tennessee based on conference record (Las Vegas 3–9 to NY Jets 2–10 and Tennessee 2–10).)	Las Vegas Raiders	West	3	14	0	.176	1–5	3–9	.538	.451	W1
15 (Note: NY Jets finished ahead of Tennessee based on strength of victory (NY Jets .373 to Tennessee .275).)	New York Jets	East	3	14	0	.176	0–6	2–10	.552	.373	L5
16	Tennessee Titans	South	3	14	0	.176	0–6	2–10	.574	.275	L2
