= Ocoee High School =

- 1925 Ocoee Crown Point Parkway; Ocoee, FL

Information
- Type: Public
- Established: 2005 (Note: An original "Ocoee High School" is believed to have been established in 1883; this article discusses the modern incarnation of the school established in 2005.)
- School district: Orange County Public Schools
- Principal: Frederick Ray
- Teaching staff: 101.00 (on an FTE basis)
- Grades: 9–12
- Enrollment: 2,599 (2023–2024)
- Student to teacher ratio: 25.73
- Colors: Black and Gold
- Mascot: Knight
- Website: ocoeehs.ocps.net

Ocoee High School (/əˈkoʊ.i/) is a public secondary school located in Ocoee, Florida, 12.5 miles west of Orlando. Built in 2005, Ocoee High School operates as a part of Orange County Public Schools (OCPS) and serves students from the cities of Ocoee, Apopka, Winter Garden, and Western Pine Hills. Ocoee High School is currently serving 2,479 students.

== Mascot ==
The Ocoee High School's mascot is a Knight wearing a gold tunic that bears the image of a rising cardinal. A cardinal was the mascot of the old Ocoee High School which was converted into Ocoee middle school in 1975. The knight symbolizes a protector that guards against forces that would cause the school to become dismantled and fold like its predecessor.

== Campus ==
Ocoee High School is on fifty-two acres near Lake Apopka. It was the largest of nine new schools opening in Orange County in 2005. Before the high school opened, the school board members considered naming the high school Crown Point High, Platinum High or Unity High. The Orange County Public School (OCPS) decided on the name, Ocoee High School, in memory of the old Ocoee High School. Ocoee High School is built on the Smaller Learning Communities Model. This places students in one of the four sub-schools for their core classes. The Ocoee sub-schools are called: Columbia, Harvard, Princeton, and Yale. Each sub-school has two counselors, a dean, and an assistant principal. Each of these smaller schools has approximately 150 students.

Ocoee High School is built on this model because research has shown that schools within a school have decreased dropout rates and they experience fewer discipline issues. "The idea is to create a small learning community for students," explained former Principal Mike Armbruster. "Instead of mingling with 2,700 students, they'll be with 700, so they don't get lost between the cracks." Ocoee High School adopted the smaller learning community model (SCL) as a part of school reform. The school board wanted students to stop getting lost in the crowd. SCL allow students to get to know each other and counselors, who push them to take more-advanced classes. "A kid who is connected...is more likely to graduate," said former principal Armbruster.

== Agriculture ==
Ocoee High School has a premier Agriculture education. The Animal Science program is led by Ms. Amy Anderson. Ms. Anderson was the agriculture teacher at Ocoee Middle School until 2017. Mr. Jordan leads the Plant Science portion.

== Music ==
The foremost program in the Ocoee High School Music Department is the band. The Ocoee High School bands include: the Freshman Band, the Symphonic Band, the Jazz Band, the Percussion Ensemble, the Winter Guard, the Spring Dance Company, the Wind Ensemble, the Marching Band, the Knights Visual Ensemble (dance team and color guard), and the Indoor Percussion Unit. The Marching Band has performed in the Cotton Bowl Music Festival, the Florida Citrus Parade, the Ikea Thanksgiving Parade, multiple Under Armour Football All-American Games that were broadcast on Entertainment and Sports Programming Network (ESPN), multiple Macy's Christmas Day Parades at Universal Studios Florida, and the New York City Veteran's Day Parade. The band is also often featured in the Florida Classic Battle Of The Bands.

The band staff is headed by director Bernard Hendricks, Jr.

Ocoee High School's premiere chorus is Excalibur, which is an extracurricular auditioned advanced chamber ensemble that performs a wide range of repertoire throughout the community and at the competitive level, consistently earning superior ratings at the annual District 8 Solo and Ensemble Music Performance Assessment. The Ocoee High School music program includes two curricular intermediate choruses: Ocoee Singers (SATB) and Mirinesse (SSA) which both regularly compete at the District 8 Concert Music Performance Assessment. Students are prepared for these ensembles in two beginning chorus classes: Bel Canto (SA) and Cantorion (TB).

The chorus staff is headed by director Nathan Caldwell.

== Academics ==
The Class of 2009 had 680 graduates. 54% of students reported that they planned to attend either a two year college or a vocational college, 37% of students reported that they plan on attending a four-year college.

Ocoee High School's average score for both the verbal and math sections of the SAT in 2009 was 530, and for the writing section of the SAT, the average score was 500. These scores are below average on both the Florida and national scales.

== The Sword in the Stone ==
"Sword in the Stone" trophy is a peer acknowledgement award. The "Sword in the Stone" concept was suggested by Matt Fitzpatrick, a former teacher at Ocoee High School. Fitzpatrick had seen this concept in action at another school, where they called it "You Rock." The "Sword in the Stone" trophy is a hand sized rock with a small sword in it. It is passed among faculty when a staff member does something special for another staff member. The award is also announced in an email to the entire staff so that everyone knows the reason for the recognition. The recipient holds the trophy for a week before passing it on to the next deserving teacher. For example, Ms. Gillam, a teacher at Ocoee High School, passed the trophy to Ms. Thorpe, because the students that Ms. Gillam received from Ms. Thorpe's class were very well prepared. Ms. Gillam said, "they say you can tell the quality of a teacher by the quality of the student, and I can tell that she is a great teacher by the students that she has given to me."

== Notable people ==
=== Students ===
- Cap Capi, football defensive end for the Jacksonville Jaguars
- David Efianayi, basketball player in the Israeli Basketball Premier League
- Caleb Gordon, Christian rapper
- Jordan Phillips, football defensive tackle for the Miami Dolphins
- Grant Riller, basketball player for the Delaware Blue Coats of the NBA G League

=== Faculty ===
- Jason Boltus (athletic coach), football quarterback
- Buck Gurley (athletic coach), football defensive tackle for NFL
- Greg Jefferson (sociology/history teacher), football defensive end for NFL
