= Jordan Phillips (American football, born 2004) =

American football player (born 2004)

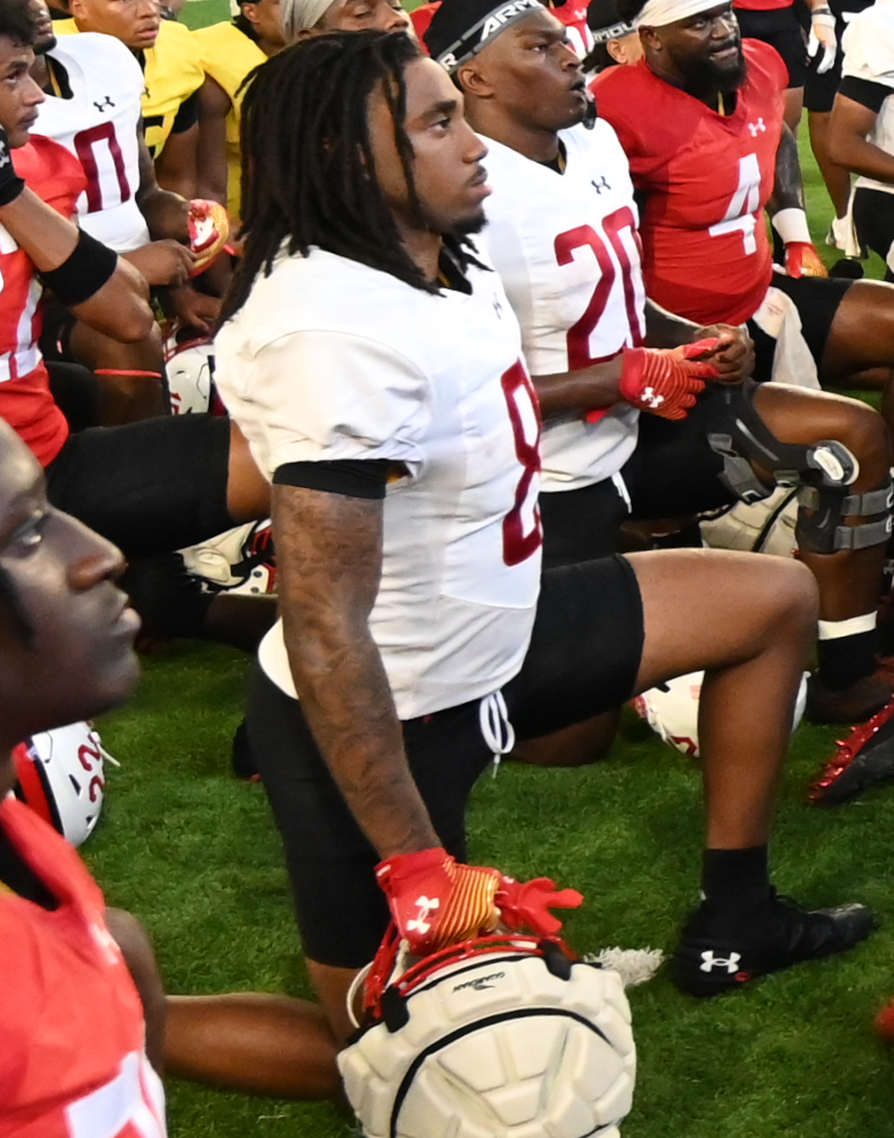
- Phillips with Maryland in 2024

No. 94 – Miami Dolphins
- Position: Defensive tackle
- Roster status: Injured reserve

Personal information
- Born: June 30, 2004 (age 22)
- Listed height: 6 ft 3 in (1.91 m)
- Listed weight: 324 lb (147 kg)

Career information
- High school: Ocoee (FL)
- College: Tennessee (2022); Maryland (2023–2024)
- NFL draft: 2025: 5th round, 143rd overall pick

Career history
- Miami Dolphins (2025–present)

Career NFL statistics as of Week 10, 2026
- Total tackles: 62
- Stats at Pro Football Reference

Jordan Phillips (born June 30, 2004) is an American professional football defensive tackle for the Miami Dolphins of the National Football League (NFL). He played college football for the Tennessee Volunteers and Maryland Terrapins and was selected by the Dolphins in the fifth round of the 2025 NFL draft.

== Early life ==
Phillips attended and played high school football at Ocoee High School in Ocoee, Florida. As a junior he totaled 71 tackles with 14 being for a loss, five sacks, and two forced fumbles in just eight games. Coming out of high school, Phillips was rated as a three-star recruit and committed to play college football for the Tennessee Volunteers over offers from schools such as Florida, Georgia, Georgia Tech, and Maryland.

== College career ==
=== Tennessee ===
As a freshman in 2022, Phillips notched one tackle in three games and entered his name into the NCAA transfer portal after the season.

=== Maryland ===
Phillips transferred to play for the Maryland Terrapins. In his first season with the team in 2023 he appeared in 13 games where he made 11 starts, notching 28 tackles with a tackle and a half being for a loss. In 2024, Phillips started all 12 games where he totaled 29 tackles with one being for a loss. After the season, he declared for the 2025 NFL draft. Phillips also accepted an invite to participate in the 2025 East-West Shrine Bowl.

== Professional career ==
Pre-draft measurables
Height	Weight	Arm length	Hand span	Wingspan	20-yard shuttle	Three-cone drill	Vertical jump	Broad jump	Bench press
6 ft 1 5/8 in (1.87 m)	312 lb (142 kg)	31 1/2 in (0.80 m)	9 3/4 in (0.25 m)	6 ft 7 1/8 in (2.01 m)	4.65 s	7.65 s	31.0 in (0.79 m)	9 ft 0 in (2.74 m)	29 reps
All values from NFL Combine/Pro Day

Phillips was selected in the fifth round, with the 143rd overall pick of the 2025 NFL draft by the Miami Dolphins.

== NFL career statistics ==
=== Regular season ===
Year	Team	Games		Tackles					Interceptions						Fumbles				
Year	Team	GP	GS	Cmb	Solo	Ast	Sck	TFL	Int	Yds	Avg	Lng	TD	PD	FF	Fmb	FR	Yds	TD
2025	MIA	17	16	34	8	26	0.0	1	0	0	0.0	0	0	0	0	0	0	0	0
Career		17	16	34	8	26	0.0	1	0	0	0.0	0	0	0	0	0	0	0	0
