= De'Von Achane =

American football player and sprinter (born 2001)

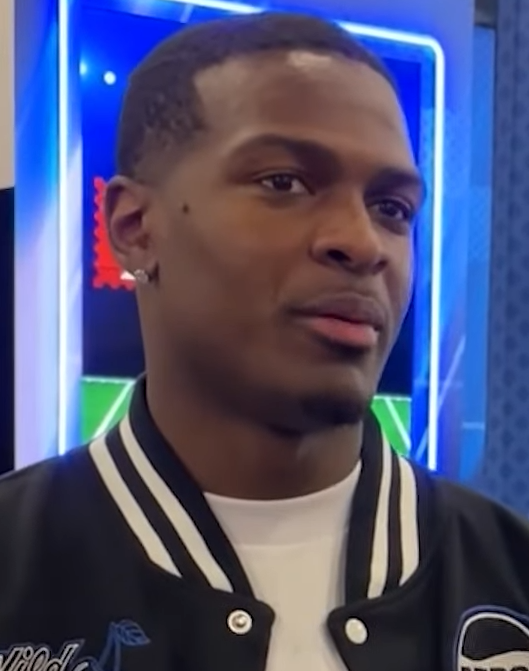
- Achane in 2024

No. 28 – Miami Dolphins
- Position: Running back
- Roster status: Injured reserve

Personal information
- Born: October 13, 2001 (age 25); Missouri City, Texas, U.S.
- Listed height: 5 ft 9 in (1.75 m)
- Listed weight: 195 lb (88 kg)

Career information
- High school: Thurgood Marshall (Missouri City)
- College: Texas A&M (2020–2022)
- NFL draft: 2023: 3rd round, 84th overall pick

Career history
- Miami Dolphins (2023–present)

Awards and highlights
- Pro Bowl (2025); First-team All-SEC (2022)

Career NFL statistics as of 2026
- Rushing yards: 3,184
- Rushing average: 5.5
- Rushing touchdowns: 22
- Receptions: 179
- Receiving yards: 1,326
- Receiving touchdowns: 13
- Stats at Pro Football Reference

De'Von Achane
Sport
- Sport: Track and field
- Events: 60 meters 100 meters 200 meters

Achievements and titles
- Personal best: 60 m 6.63 (Albuquerque 2022) 100 m 10.02 (Austin 2022) 200 m 20.20 (College Station 2022)

De'Von Achane (/dəˈvɒn ˈeɪtʃæn/ də-VON AY-chan; born October 13, 2001) is an American professional football running back for the Miami Dolphins of the National Football League (NFL). He played college football for the Texas A&M Aggies and was selected by the Dolphins in the third round of the 2023 NFL draft.

== Early life ==
Achane attended Thurgood Marshall High School in Missouri City, Texas. During his high school career, he rushed for 4,795 yards with 87 touchdowns, and was ranked as a 4-star recruit and 96th overall in the nation. He also ran track in high school and was the 2020 Texas Gatorade Boys Track & Field Athlete of the Year. On December 18, 2019, Achane committed to Texas A&M University.

== College career ==
As a true freshman at Texas A&M in 2020, Achane played in six games as a backup to Isaiah Spiller. He rushed for 364 yards on 43 carries with four touchdowns, as well as 97 yards on 5 receptions with one touchdown. Achane was named the MVP of the 2021 Orange Bowl after rushing for 140 yards on 12 carries with two rushing touchdowns in a 41–27 victory over North Carolina.

Achane returned for his sophomore season in 2021, substantially increasing his role in the Texas A&M offense, where he recorded over 1,000 all-purpose yards for the Aggies, as well as leading the SEC in rushing yards per attempt (7.0). He had four games with over 100 rushing yards and four games with multiple rushing touchdowns. In one of the highlights of his college career, Achane made a 96-yard kickoff return, helping to lead the Aggies 41–38 over No. 1 Alabama.

In 2022, Achane became the starting running back for Texas A&M and posted a new career-high in rushing yards (1,102). In his last game for the Aggies, he had 38 carries for 215 rushing yards and two rushing touchdowns in a win over LSU.

Achane also competed for the Texas A&M Aggies track and field team as a sprinter.

== Professional career ==
Achane was praised for his blazing speed and great inside running, but fell in the draft due to his size standards for NFL running backs, despite his muscular stature. Achane had the fastest 40-yard dash among all running backs in the draft.

Pre-draft measurables
Height	Weight	Arm length	Hand span	Wingspan	40-yard dash	10-yard split	20-yard split	20-yard shuttle	Three-cone drill	Vertical jump	Broad jump
5 ft 8 1/2 in (1.74 m)	188 lb (85 kg)	29 in (0.74 m)	8 1/2 in (0.22 m)	5 ft 9 1/8 in (1.76 m)	4.32 s	1.51 s	2.49 s	4.36 s	7.05 s	33.0 in (0.84 m)	9 ft 3 in (2.82 m)
All values from NFL Combine/Pro Day

The Miami Dolphins selected Achane in the third round, 84th overall, of the 2023 NFL draft.

=== 2023 ===
During Week 3 against the Denver Broncos, Achane had a breakout performance, finishing with 203 yards on 18 carries and two rushing touchdowns, and 30 yards on four receptions and two receiving touchdowns, as the Dolphins won 70–20. This earned him AFC Offensive Player of the Week for Week 3. In the following game against the Buffalo Bills, he had eight carries for 101 yards and two rushing touchdowns in the 48–20 loss. In his first career start in Week 5 against the New York Giants, he had 11 carries for 151 yards and a rushing touchdown in the 31–16 win.

On October 11, 2023, following the win over the Giants, Achane suffered a knee injury and was placed on injured reserve, and was re-activated on November 18. In Week 17 against the Baltimore Ravens, he had 14 carries for 107 rushing yards and a receiving touchdown in the 56–19 loss. In 11 games and four starts in his rookie season, Achane finished with 103 carries for 800 yards and eight rushing touchdowns, to go with 27 receptions for 197 yards and three receiving touchdowns.

=== 2024 ===
In Week 1 of the 2024 season against the Jacksonville Jaguars, Achane totaled 100 all-purpose yards and a rushing touchdown in the 20–17 win. The following week against the Bills, he had 165 scrimmage yards and a receiving touchdown in the 31–10 loss at home. In Week 9 against Buffalo on the road, he had 121 scrimmage yards, a rushing touchdown and a receiving touchdown in the 30–27 loss. In Week 16 against the San Francisco 49ers, he had 120 yards on 17 carries and a rushing touchdown in the 29–17 win. In Week 18 against the New York Jets on the road, he had 121 yards on 11 carries and a rushing touchdown in the 32–20 loss. Achane finished the 2024 season with 203 carries for 907 yards and six rushing touchdowns, to go with 78 receptions for 592 yards and six receiving touchdowns, in 17 games and 16 starts.

=== 2025 ===
In Week 2 of the 2025 season against the New England Patriots, Achane recorded eight receptions for 92 yards and a receiving touchdown in the 33–27 loss. In Week 10, at home against the 6–3 Buffalo Bills, Achane led the 2–7 Dolphins' offensive attack, recording 6 receptions for 51 receiving yards, and rushing for 174 yards and two touchdowns including a 59-yard touchdown rush, in the 30–13 victory. Achane's 5.7 yards per carry led the league. Achane was named to the AFC Pro Bowl Games roster. He finished the 2025 season with 238 carries for 1,350 rushing yards and eight rushing touchdowns to go with 67 receptions for 488 receiving yards and four receiving touchdowns.

=== 2026 ===
On May 13, 2026, Achane signed a four-year, $64 million contract extension with the Dolphins.

During Week 3 against the Kansas City Chiefs, Achane departed due to a knee injury. The next day, it was confirmed that Achane had suffered a torn ACL, which prematurely ended his 2026 season.

== Career statistics ==
Legend
	Led the league
**Bold**	Career high

=== NFL ===
==== Regular season ====
Year	Team	Games		Rushing					Receiving					Fumbles	
Year	Team	GP	GS	Att	Yds	Avg	Lng	TD	Rec	Yds	Avg	Lng	TD	Fum	Lost
2023	MIA	11	4	103	800	**7.8**	**76**	**8**	27	197	7.3	23	3	**1**	**1**
2024	MIA	**17**	16	203	907	4.5	61	6	**78**	**592**	**7.6**	**39**	**6**	**1**	0
2025	MIA	16	16	**238**	**1,350**	5.7	59	**8**	67	488	7.3	29	4	**1**	0
2026	MIA	3	3	34	127	3.7	17	0	7	49	7.0	14	0	0	0
Career		47	39	578	3,184	5.5	76	22	179	1,326	7.4	39	13	3	1

==== Postseason ====
Year	Team	Games		Rushing					Receiving					Fumbles	
Year	Team	GP	GS	Att	Yds	Avg	Lng	TD	Rec	Yds	Avg	Lng	TD	Fum	Lost
2023	MIA	1	0	6	9	1.5	3	0	3	21	7.0	11	0	0	0
Career		1	0	6	9	1.5	3	0	3	21	7.0	11	0	0	0

=== College ===
Year	Team	Games		Rushing				Receiving				Kick returns			
Year	Team	GP	GS	Att	Yds	Avg	TD	Rec	Yds	Avg	TD	Ret	Yds	Avg	TD
2020	Texas A&M	8	0	43	364	**8.5**	4	5	97	**19.4**	1	0	0	0.0	0
2021	Texas A&M	12	0	130	910	7.0	**9**	24	**261**	10.9	1	9	301	**33.4**	**1**
2022	Texas A&M	10	10	**196**	**1,102**	5.6	8	**36**	196	5.4	**3**	**11**	**312**	28.4	**1**
Career		30	10	369	2,376	6.4	21	65	554	8.5	5	20	613	30.7	2
