= Cap Capi =

American football player (born 1992)

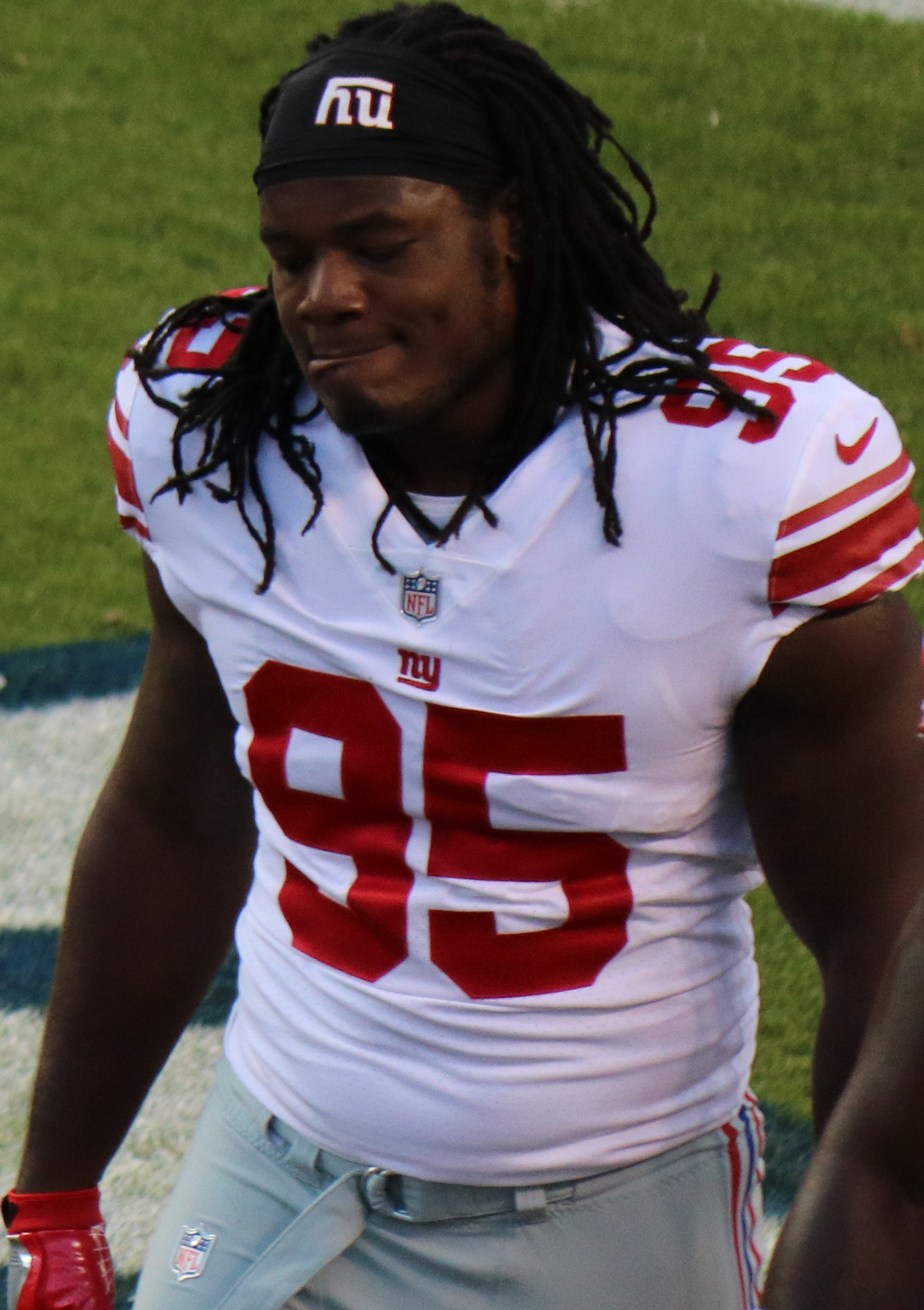
- Capi with the Giants in 2017

Profile
- Position: Defensive end

Personal information
- Born: July 11, 1992 (age 34); Ocoee, Florida, U.S.
- Listed height: 6 ft 3 in (1.91 m)
- Listed weight: 249 lb (113 kg)

Career information
- High school: Ocoee (FL)
- College: Colorado State (2010–2011); Akron (2012–2014)
- NFL draft: 2015: undrafted

Career history
- Jacksonville Jaguars (2015)*; Baltimore Ravens (2015)*; Atlanta Falcons (2016)*; Arizona Cardinals (2016–2017)*; New York Giants (2017); Buffalo Bills (2017); Arizona Cardinals (2018)*
- * Offseason or practice squad member only

Awards and highlights
- First-team All-MWC (2011); Second-team All-MAC (2014)

Career NFL statistics
- Tackles: 7
- Sacks: 1
- Forced fumbles: 1
- Stats at Pro Football Reference

Nordly "Cap" Capi (born July 11, 1992) is an American professional former football defensive end. He played college football at Akron. He was signed by the Jacksonville Jaguars as an undrafted free agent in 2015.

== Professional career ==
=== Jacksonville Jaguars ===
Capi was signed by the Jacksonville Jaguars as an undrafted free agent on May 11, 2015. He was waived on September 4, 2015.

=== Baltimore Ravens ===
On October 20, 2015, Capi was signed to the Baltimore Ravens' practice squad. He was released on November 10, 2015 but was later re-signed on December 21, 2015. He was released on May 13, 2016.

=== Atlanta Falcons ===
On June 7, 2016, Capi was signed by the Atlanta Falcons. He was waived on September 2, 2016 and was signed to the practice squad the next day. He was released on September 20, 2016.

=== Arizona Cardinals (first stint) ===
On October 3, 2016, Capi was signed to the Arizona Cardinals' practice squad. On January 3, 2017, he signed a future contract with the Cardinals. He was waived on September 2, 2017.

=== New York Giants ===
On September 4, 2017, Capi was signed to the New York Giants' practice squad. He was promoted to the active roster on September 28, 2017. He was placed on injured reserve on October 31, 2017 with a hamstring injury. He was released on November 10, 2017.

=== Buffalo Bills ===
On November 21, 2017, Capi was signed to the Buffalo Bills' practice squad. He was promoted to the active roster on December 5, 2017. On April 17, 2018, Capi was waived by the Bills.

=== Arizona Cardinals (second stint) ===
On August 2, 2018, Capi signed with the Arizona Cardinals. Despite leading the preseason with four sacks, Capi was waived by the Cardinals on September 1, 2018.
