= Ethan Robinson =

American football player (born 2003)

Profile
- Position: Cornerback

Personal information
- Born: April 30, 2003 (age 23); Bronxville, New York, U.S.
- Listed height: 6 ft 0 in (1.83 m)
- Listed weight: 195 lb (88 kg)

Career information
- High school: Iona Prep (New Rochelle, New York)
- College: Bucknell (2021–2023); Minnesota (2024)
- NFL draft: 2025: undrafted

Career history
- Miami Dolphins (2025–2026)

Career NFL statistics as of 2025
- Games played: 2
- Stats at Pro Football Reference

Louis Ethan Robinson (born April 30, 2003) is an American football cornerback. He played college football for the Bucknell Bison and Minnesota Golden Gophers.

== Early life ==
Robinson was born on April 30, 2003, in Bronxville, New York. He attended Iona Preparatory School in New Rochelle, New York, where he played football and basketball. There, he started three years on the football team and was captain, winning the conference championship in 2019. After high school, he committed to play college football for the NCAA Division I FCS-level Bucknell Bison.

Robinson started six games at cornerback as a freshman at Bucknell in 2021, posting 54 tackles and a team-leading five pass breakups and two forced fumbles. He then tallied 50 tackles, five pass breakups and an interception in 2022. In 2023, Robinson posted 50 tackles, 10 pass breakups and three interceptions, being named first-team All-Patriot League. In total, he started 26 games with Bucknell.

After the 2023 season, Robinson entered the NCAA transfer portal and transferred to the Minnesota Golden Gophers. He was a starter in his only season there. He recorded 42 tackles, eight pass breakups and three interceptions while starting all 13 games, earning honorable mention All-Big Ten Conference honors. Across his four years at Bucknell and Minnesota, Robinson recorded 196 tackles, 31 pass defended, eight interceptions and a sack in 44 games.

== Professional career ==
Pre-draft measurables
Height	Weight	Arm length	Hand span	Wingspan	40-yard dash	10-yard split	20-yard split	20-yard shuttle	Three-cone drill	Vertical jump	Broad jump	Bench press
5 ft 10 5/8 in (1.79 m)	195 lb (88 kg)	31 in (0.79 m)	9 3/8 in (0.24 m)	6 ft 2 3/8 in (1.89 m)	4.59 s	1.63 s	2.65 s	4.39 s	6.94 s	42.0 in (1.07 m)	10 ft 7 in (3.23 m)	10 reps
All values from Pro Day

After going unselected in the 2025 NFL draft, Robinson signed with the Miami Dolphins as an undrafted free agent. In a preseason win against the Detroit Lions, he had the game-sealing interception. He was waived on August 26, 2025, at the final roster cuts. He was re–signed to the team's practice squad on October 28. He was elevated to the active roster on December 20 and made his NFL debut the following day against the Cincinnati Bengals, appearing on eight special teams snaps.

The Dolphins waived Robinson with an injury designation on August 16, 2026. He passed through waivers unclaimed, and reverted to the Dolphins' injured reserve list the next day. He was waived again with an injury settlement on August 25.
