= 2026 Tennessee Titans season =

67th season in franchise history; last in Nissan Stadium

- Owner: KSA Industries
- General manager: Mike Borgonzi
- President: Burke Nihill
- Head coach: Robert Saleh
- Offensive coordinator: Brian Daboll
- Defensive coordinator: Gus Bradley
- Home stadium: Nissan Stadium

Results
- Record: 1–9
- Division place: 4th AFC South

Uniform
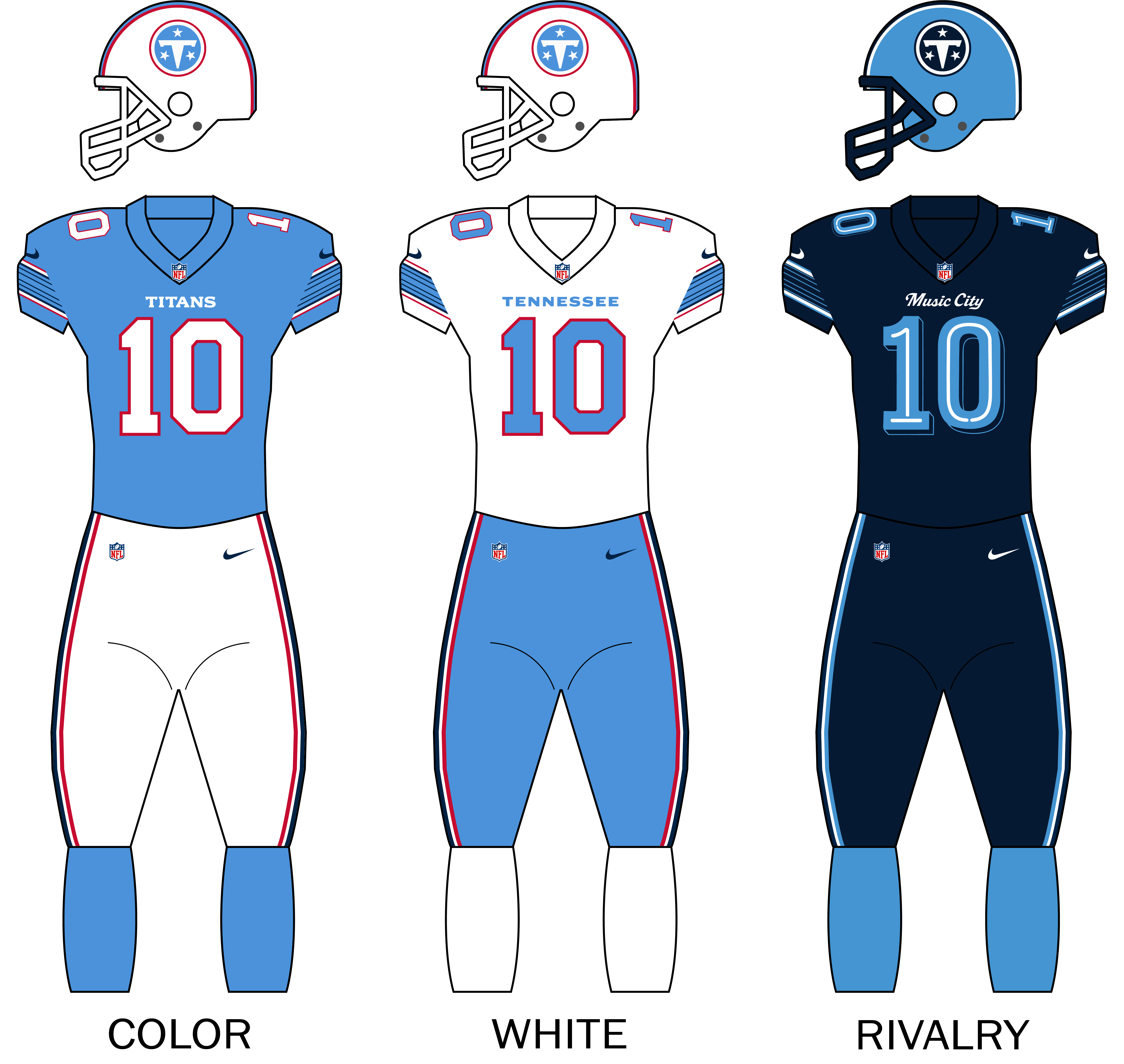

The 2026 season is the Tennessee Titans' 57th in the National Football League (NFL), their 67th overall, their 30th in the state of Tennessee, their second under general manager Mike Borgonzi, and their first under head coach Robert Saleh. They will seek to improve upon their record of 3–14 from the past two seasons and end their four-year drought of both a playoff appearance and an AFC South title. This is Saleh's second head coaching job; he was previously the head coach of the Jets from 2021 to the first five games of the 2024 season. In a scheduling coincidence, the Titans began the Robert Saleh era by losing to the Jets.

This is scheduled to be the final season in which the Titans will play their home games at their current Nissan Stadium, as the new stadium, also to be called Nissan Stadium, is scheduled to be completed by the start of the 2027 season.

On March 12, 2026, the Titans revealed new uniforms; this is their first uniform change since 2018. Along with the uniforms, the team also unveiled a new logo, eliminating the flames from the previous logo. The colors of the uniforms and logo were also changed to reflect the original colors of the Houston Oilers. For the first time since 2009, the Titans failed to win any of their first 5 games, and this season began with the team's second 1–9 start in as many seasons. They suffered their 5th consecutive losing season after a 51–30 road loss to the Dallas Cowboys.

== Offseason ==
=== Coaching changes ===
On October 13, 2025, head coach Brian Callahan was fired by the Titans following a 1–5 start to the 2025 season for the second consecutive year. Mike McCoy was promoted to interim head coach, leading the Titans to a 2–9 record to conclude the season.

On January 22, 2026, the Titans hired Robert Saleh as their new head coach.

On January 27, 2026, the Titans hired former New York Giants head coach Brian Daboll to be the team's offensive coordinator.

=== Draft ===
2026 Tennessee Titans draft selections
Round	Selection	Player	Position	College	Notes
1	4	Carnell Tate	WR	Ohio State	
1	31	Keldric Faulk	DE	Auburn	From Patriots via Bills
2	35	Traded to the Buffalo Bills			
2	60	Anthony Hill Jr.	LB	Texas	From Bills via Bears
3	66	Traded to the Buffalo Bills			
3	69	Traded to the Chicago Bears			From Giants via Texans and Bills
4	101	Traded to the Buffalo Bills			
5	142	Fernando Carmona	G	Arkansas	From Jets via Ravens
5	144	Traded to the Chicago Bears			From Titans via Rams
5	165	Nicholas Singleton	RB	Penn State	From Bears via Bills
6	184	Jackie Marshall	DT	Baylor	
6	194	Pat Coogan	C	Indiana	From Ravens via Jets
6	207	Traded to the Los Angeles Rams			From Texans via Rams
7	218	Traded to the Dallas Cowboys			
7	225	Jaren Kanak	TE	Oklahoma	From Chiefs via Cowboys
7	238	Traded to the New York Jets			From Chargers

2026 Tennessee Titans undrafted free agents
Name	Position	College	Ref.
Shad Banks	LB	UTSA	
Hank Beatty	WR	Illinois	
Sean Brown	LB	NC State	
Bishop Fitzgerald	S	USC	
Jeadyn Lukus	CB	Clemson	
Latrell McCutchin	CB	Houston	
Jalen McMurray	CB	Tennessee	
Rasheed Miller	OT	Louisville	
Tyren Montgomery	WR	John Carroll	
Mani Powell	LB	Purdue	
Aamil Wagner	OT	Notre Dame	

== Staff ==
Tennessee Titans staff
Front office: Owner – KSA Industries; Controlling owner – Amy Adams Strunk; President/CEO – Burke Nihill; General manager – Mike Borgonzi; Assistant general manager – Dave Ziegler; Executive vice president of football operations – Dave Gardi; Senior vice president of football administration/player finance – Vin Marino; Football Counsel/Head of football research – Bryce Wasserman; Director of football administration – Leland Taylor; Vice president of player personnel – Dan Saganey; Director of player personnel – Jon Salge; Director of college scouting – Mike Boni; Director of pro scouting – Shane Normandeau; Assistant director of college scouting – Dale Thompson; Vice president/football advisor – Reggie McKenzie; Director, Strategy and analytics – Benjamin Contrino; Coordinator, football research and development – Erin Psajdl Davis; Head coaches: Head coach – Robert Saleh; Assistant head coach/special teams coordinator – John Fassel; Offensive coaches: Offensive coordinator – Brian Daboll; Quarterbacks – Shea Tierney; Running backs/Bill Walsh diversity coaching fellowship coordinator – Randy Jordan; Wide receivers – Greg Lewis; Tight ends – Luke Stocker; Offensive line – Carmen Bricillo; Assistant offensive line – Isaac Williams; Offensive assistant/game management – Cade Knox; Offensive assistant – Trevor Browder; Offensive assistant – John Rudnicki	Defensive coaches: Defensive coordinator – Gus Bradley; Defensive line – Aaron Whitecotton; Assistant defensive line – Tanzel Smart; Linebackers – Dave Borgonzi; Passing game coordinator/cornerbacks – Tony Oden; Defensive backs/safeties – Marquand Manuel; Defensive backs/nickels – Dalton Hilliard; Senior defensive assistant – Ben Bloom; Defensive assistant – Ahmed Saleh; Special teams coaches: Assistant special teams – Rayna Stewart; Assistant to the head coach – Tom Jones; Strength and conditioning: Director of sports performance – Zac Woodfin; Assistant director of sports performance – Brian Bell; Senior assistant of sports performance – Dave Poluka; Assistant of sports performance – Brent Callaway; Assistant of sports performance & speed training – John Shaw; → Coaching staff → Front office → More NFL staffs

== Current roster ==
Tennessee Titans roster
Quarterbacks (QB): 10 Mitchell Trubisky; 1 Cam Ward; Running backs (RB): 36 Julius Chestnut; 20 Tony Pollard; 32 Nicholas Singleton; Wide receivers (WR): 5 Elic Ayomanor; 17 Chimere Dike RS; 87 Xavier Restrepo; 0 Calvin Ridley; 14 Carnell Tate; Tight ends (TE): 82 Daniel Bellinger; 86 Kylen Granson; 84 Gunnar Helm; 88 David Martin-Robinson	Offensive linemen (OL): 79 Pat Coogan C; 78 Brandon Crenshaw-Dickson T; 71 Garrett Dellinger G; 59 James Hudson T; 55 JC Latham T; 70 Atonio Mafi G; 75 Dan Moore T; 51 Austin Schlottmann C; 76 Chandler Zavala G; Defensive linemen (DL): 15 Keldric Faulk DE; 91 John Franklin-Myers DT; 94 Timmy Horne DT; 11 Jermaine Johnson II DE; 56 Truman Jones DE; 99 Jonah Laulu DT; 57 Jacob Martin DE; 96 Jackie Marshall DT; 7 Oluwafemi Oladejo DE; 93 Nazir Stackhouse DT; 90 Solomon Thomas DT	Linebackers (LB): 50 Cody Barton; 44 Mohamoud Diabate; 33 Cedric Gray; 53 Anthony Hill Jr.; 54 Dorian Mausi; Defensive backs (DB): 29 Tony Adams S; 38 Terrell Burgess S; 18 Cor'Dale Flott CB; 26 Marcus Harris CB; 42 Jaylon Jones CB; 28 Isaiah Oliver S; 21 Micah Robinson CB; 24 Alontae Taylor CB; 25 Joshua Williams CB; 23 Kevin Winston Jr. S; Special teams (ST): 46 Morgan Cox LS; 13 Thomas Morstead P; 6 Joey Slye K	Practice squad: 89 Jason Brownlee WR; 35 Michael Carter RB; 48 Jimmy Ciarlo LB; 37 Bishop Fitzgerald S; 41 Erick Hallett S; 40 Dominique Hampton LB; 97 Jalyn Holmes DE; 16 Hendon Hooker QB; 62 Rasheed Miller T; 19 Tyren Montgomery WR; 67 Drew Moss C; 31 Kalel Mullings RB; 85 K. J. Osborn WR; 39 Jakob Robinson CB; 68 Laki Tasi DT (IPP); 80 Jamari Thrash WR; 83 Joel Wilson TE; Reserve: 30 Kendell Brooks CB (IR); 66 Fernando Carmona G (IR/DFR); 45 Milo Eifler LB (IR); 92 Jaylen Harrell DE (IR); 81 Jaren Kanak TE (IR); 58 Tanoh Kpassagnon DE (IR); 4 Wan'Dale Robinson WR (IR); 77 Peter Skoronski G (IR); 64 Jackson Slater G (IR); 2 Tyjae Spears RB (IR); 3 Tommy Townsend P (IR); 52 James Williams LB (IR) 52 active, 16 practice squad (1 IPP), 12 reserve As of November 22, 2026. Rookies in italics.; Roster; Depth chart; Transactions

=== Team captains ===
2026 Tennessee Titans team captains
Name	Position	Notes	Ref.
Cam Ward	QB	Named captain on September 9, 2026	
Jeffery Simmons	DT	Named captain on September 9, 2026; Traded to Chicago Bears on October 29, 2026	
Morgan Cox	LS	Named captain on September 9, 2026	
Amani Hooker	S	Named captain on November 1, 2026; Traded to Buffalo Bills on November 10, 2026	

== Preseason ==
Week	Date	Opponent	Result	Record	Venue	Recap
1	August 13	at San Francisco 49ers	W 19–13	1–0	Levi's Stadium	Recap
2	August 23	Seattle Seahawks	W 19–16	2–0	Nissan Stadium	Recap
3	August 29	Chicago Bears	L 15–24	2–1	Nissan Stadium	Recap

== Regular season ==
=== Schedule ===
Week	Date	Time (CT)	Opponent	Result	Record	Venue	Network	Recap
1	September 13	12:00 p.m.	New York Jets	**L** 10–23	0–1	Nissan Stadium	CBS	Recap
2	September 20	12:00 p.m.	Philadelphia Eagles	**L** 20–24	0–2	Nissan Stadium	Fox	Recap
3	September 27	12:00 p.m.	at New York Giants	**L** 7–12	0–3	MetLife Stadium	CBS	Recap
4	October 4	12:00 p.m.	at Baltimore Ravens	**L** 18–24	0–4	M&T Bank Stadium	CBS	Recap
5	October 11	12:00 p.m.	**Houston Texans**	**L** 3–26	0–5	Nissan Stadium	CBS	Recap
6	October 18	12:00 p.m.	at **Indianapolis Colts**	**W** 26–20	1–5	Lucas Oil Stadium	Fox	Recap
7	October 25	12:00 p.m.	Cleveland Browns	**L** 24–27	1–6	Nissan Stadium	CBS	Recap
8	November 1	12:00 p.m.	at Cincinnati Bengals	**L** 36–43 (OT)	1–7	Paycor Stadium	CBS	Recap
9	Bye							
10	November 15	12:00 p.m.	**Jacksonville Jaguars**	**L** 23–40	1–8	Nissan Stadium	Fox	Recap
11	November 22	12:00 p.m.	at Dallas Cowboys	**L** 30–51	1–9	AT&T Stadium	Fox	Recap
12	November 29	12:00 p.m.	at **Jacksonville Jaguars**			EverBank Stadium	Fox	
13	December 6	12:00 p.m.	Washington Commanders			Nissan Stadium	CBS	
14	December 13	12:00 p.m.	at Detroit Lions			Ford Field	Fox	
15	December 20	12:00 p.m.	**Indianapolis Colts**			Nissan Stadium	CBS	
16	December 27	3:05 p.m.	at Las Vegas Raiders			Allegiant Stadium	Fox	
17	January 3	12:00 p.m.	Pittsburgh Steelers			Nissan Stadium	CBS	
18	January 9/10	TBD	at **Houston Texans**			Reliant Stadium	TBD	

Notes

- Intra-division opponents are in **bold** text.
- Networks, dates and times from Weeks 13–17 are subject to change as a result of flexible scheduling.
- The date, time and network for Week 18 will be finalized at the end of Week 17.

=== Game summaries ===
==== Week 1: vs. New York Jets ====
Week 1: New York Jets at Tennessee Titans – Game summary

Quarter	1	2	3	4	Total
**Jets**	7	3	10	3	**23**
Titans	3	0	0	7	**10**

at Nissan Stadium, Nashville, Tennessee

- Date: September 13
- Game time: 12:00 p.m. CDT
- Game weather: Cloudy, 90 °F (32 °C)
- Game attendance: 64,336
- Referee: Land Clark
- TV announcers (CBS): Spero Dedes, Adam Archuleta and Aditi Kinkhabwala
- Recap, Game Book

Game information

**First quarter**

- NYJ – Kenyon Sadiq 3-yard run (Jason Sanders kick), 10:45. Jets 7–0. **Drive: 8 plays, 60 yards, 4:15.**
- TEN – Joey Slye 42-yard field goal, 5:03. Jets 7–3. **Drive: 12 plays, 41 yards, 5:42.**

**Second quarter**

- NYJ – Jason Sanders 33-yard field goal, 5:03. Jets 10–3. **Drive: 19 plays, 74 yards, 11:48.**

**Third quarter**

- NYJ – Breece Hall 4-yard run (Jason Sanders kick), 9:41. Jets 17–3. **Drive: 5 plays, 80 yards, 3:20.**
- NYJ – Jason Sanders 51-yard field goal, 4:33. Jets 20–3. **Drive: 7 plays, 46 yards, 4:05.**

**Fourth quarter**

- NYJ – Jason Sanders 51-yard field goal, 5:00. Jets 23–3. **Drive: 5 plays, 19 yards, 3:01.**
- TEN – Elic Ayomanor 11-yard pass from Cam Ward (Joey Slye kick), 2:42. Jets 23–10. **Drive: 9 plays, 65 yards, 2:18.**

**Top passers**

- NYJ – Geno Smith – 19/24, 215 yards
- TEN – Cam Ward – 19/32, 140 yards, TD

**Top rushers**

- NYJ – Breece Hall – 22 rushes, 102 yards, TD
- TEN – Tony Pollard – 7 rushes, 35 yards

**Top receivers**

- NYJ – Garrett Wilson – 6 receptions, 79 yards
- TEN – Wan'Dale Robinson – 5 receptions, 38 yards

This marked the Titans' third loss to the Jets since 2021.

==== Week 2: vs. Philadelphia Eagles ====
Week 2: Philadelphia Eagles at Tennessee Titans – Game summary

Quarter	1	2	3	4	Total
**Eagles**	0	14	3	7	**24**
Titans	7	3	7	3	**20**

at Nissan Stadium, Nashville, Tennessee

- Date: September 20
- Game time: 12:00 p.m. CDT
- Game weather: Cloudy, 92 °F (33 °C)
- Game attendance: 68,567
- Referee: Clay Martin
- TV announcers (Fox): Adam Amin, Drew Brees and Kristina Pink
- Recap, Game Book

Game information

**First quarter**

- TEN – Cam Ward 1-yard run (Joey Slye kick), 4:22. Titans 7–0. **Drive: 4 plays, 10 yards, 1:34.**

**Second quarter**

- PHI – Tank Bigsby 2-yard run (Jake Elliott kick), 12:49. Tied 7–7. **Drive: 11 plays, 65 yards, 6:33.**
- PHI – Devonta Smith 22-yard pass from Jalen Hurts (Jake Elliott kick), 1:49. Eagles 14–7. **Drive: 14 plays, 81 yards, 7:38.**
- TEN – Joey Slye 37-yard field goal, 0:00. Eagles 14–10. **Drive: 8 plays, 51 yards, 1:49.**

**Third quarter**

- PHI – Jake Elliott 58-yard field goal, 8:08. Eagles 17–10. **Drive: 7 plays, 16 yards, 2:00.**
- TEN – Cam Ward 1-yard run (Joey Slye kick), Tied 17–17. **Drive: 12 plays, 69 yards, 7:11.**

**Fourth quarter**

- TEN – Joey Slye 33-yard field goal, 1:56. Titans 20–17. **Drive: 10 plays, 69 yards, 4:04.**
- PHI – Darius Cooper 3-yard pass from Jalen Hurts (Jake Elliott kick), 0:09. Eagles 24–20. **Drive: 9 plays, 65 yards, 1:47.**

**Top passers**

- PHI – Jalen Hurts – 26/37, 264 yards, 2 TD, INT
- TEN – Cam Ward – 13/20, 183 yards

**Top rushers**

- PHI – Tank Bigsby – 13 rushes, 33 yards, TD
- TEN – Tony Pollard – 14 rushes, 64 yards

**Top receivers**

- PHI – Devonta Smith – 10 receptions, 117 yards, TD
- TEN – Elic Ayomanor – 2 receptions, 69 yards

This marked the Titans' first home loss to the Eagles since 1991 (when the franchise was known as the Houston Oilers).

==== Week 3: at New York Giants ====
Week 3: Tennessee Titans at New York Giants – Game summary

Quarter	1	2	3	4	Total
Titans	0	0	0	7	**7**
**Giants**	3	6	3	0	**12**

at MetLife Stadium, East Rutherford, New Jersey

- Date: September 27
- Game time: 1:00 p.m. EDT/12:00 p.m. CDT
- Game weather: Light rain, 62 °F (17 °C)
- Game attendance: 79,919
- Referee: Alan Eck
- TV announcers (CBS): Andrew Catalon, Logan Ryan and AJ Ross
- Recap, Game Book

Game information

**First quarter**

- NYG – Dominic Zvada 39-yard field goal, 6:34. Giants 3–0. **Drive: 8 plays, 50 yards, 4:15.**

**Second quarter**

- NYG – Dominic Zvada 27-yard field goal, 4:49. Giants 6–0. **Drive: 11 plays, 44 yards, 7:10.**
- NYG – Dominic Zvada 39-yard field goal, 0:00. Giants 9–0. **Drive: 7 plays, 30 yards, 0:41.**

**Third quarter**

- NYG – Dominic Zvada 30-yard field goal, 6:56. Giants 12–0. **Drive: 12 plays, 59 yards, 8:04.**

**Fourth quarter**

- TEN – Wan'Dale Robinson 4-yard pass from Cam Ward (Joey Slye kick), 5:35. Giants 12–7. **Drive: 13 plays, 91 yards, 7:08.**

**Top passers**

- TEN – Cam Ward – 23/36, 181 yards, TD, INT
- NYG – Jameis Winston – 14/22, 118 yards

**Top rushers**

- TEN – Tony Pollard – 17 rushes, 74 yards
- NYG – Cam Skattebo – 20 rushes, 60 yards

**Top receivers**

- TEN – Carnell Tate – 6 receptions, 58 yards
- NYG – Cam Skattebo – 3 receptions, 40 yards

==== Week 4: at Baltimore Ravens ====
Week 4: Tennessee Titans at Baltimore Ravens – Game summary

Quarter	1	2	3	4	Total
Titans	7	0	3	8	**18**
**Ravens**	7	17	0	0	**24**

at M&T Bank Stadium, Baltimore, Maryland

- Date: October 4
- Game time: 1:00 p.m. EDT/12:00 p.m. CDT
- Game weather: Overcast, 62 °F (17 °C)
- Game attendance: 70,101
- Referee: Shawn Hochuli
- TV announcers (CBS): Chris Lewis, Luke Kuechly and Amanda Balionis
- Recap, Game Book

Game information

**First quarter**

- BAL – Derrick Henry 5-yard run (Tyler Loop kick), 12:09. Ravens 7–0. **Drive: 5 plays, 37 yards, 1:59.**
- TEN – Tony Pollard 5-yard run (Joey Slye kick), 5:56. Tied 7–7. **Drive: 10 plays, 70 yards, 6:13.**

**Second quarter**

- BAL – Zay Flowers 19-yard pass from Lamar Jackson (Tyler Loop kick), 12:16. Ravens 14–7. **Drive: 6 plays, 81 yards, 2:51.**
- BAL – Mark Andrews 3-yard pass from Lamar Jackson (Tyler Loop kick), 3:32. Ravens 21–7. **Drive: 8 plays, 98 yards, 4:44.**
- BAL – Tyler Loop 64-yard field goal, 0:00. Ravens 24–7. **Drive: 6 plays, 19 yards, 0:35.**

**Third quarter**

- TEN – Joey Slye 33-yard field goal, 6:52. Ravens 24–10. **Drive: 10 plays, 76 yards, 5:50.**

**Fourth quarter**

- TEN – Wandale Robinson 3-yard pass from Cam Ward (Cam Ward-Gunnar Helm pass), 1:12. Ravens 24–18. **Drive: 7 plays, 70 yards, 2:08.**

**Top passers**

- TEN – Cam Ward – 20/31, 222 yards, TD, INT
- BAL – Lamar Jackson – 15/20, 222 yards, 2 TD

**Top rushers**

- TEN – Tony Pollard – 16 rushes, 48 yards, TD
- BAL – Derrick Henry – 23 rushes, 73 yards, TD

**Top receivers**

- TEN – Carnell Tate – 9 receptions, 145 yards
- BAL – Zay Flowers – 8 receptions, 118 yards, TD

This marked the Titans' first road loss to the Ravens since 2014 (third straight loss overall since the 2020 Wild Card).

==== Week 5: vs. Houston Texans ====
Week 5: Houston Texans at Tennessee Titans – Game summary

Quarter	1	2	3	4	Total
**Texans**	3	9	7	7	**26**
Titans	3	0	0	0	**3**

at Nissan Stadium, Nashville, Tennessee

- Date: October 11
- Game time: 12:00 p.m. CDT
- Game weather: Cloudy, 64 °F (18 °C)
- Game attendance: 52,097
- Referee: Alex Kemp
- TV announcers (CBS): Spero Dedes, Adam Archuleta and Aditi Kinkhabwala
- Recap, Game Book

Game information

**First quarter**

- TEN – Joey Slye 30-yard field goal, 10:39. Titans 3–0. **Drive: 9 plays, 58 yards, 4:21.**
- HOU – Ka'imi Fairbairn 45-yard field goal, 2:22. Tied 3–3. **Drive: 10 plays, 49 yards, 5:13.**

**Second quarter**

- HOU – Ka'imi Fairbairn 35-yard field goal, 13:33. Texans 6–3. **Drive: 6 plays, 18 yards, 3:11.**
- HOU – Ka'imi Fairbairn 26-yard field goal, 6:56. Texans 9–3. **Drive: 9 plays, 34 yards, 5:11.**
- HOU – Ka'imi Fairbairn 53-yard field goal, 1:15. Texans 12–3. **Drive: 8 plays, 34 yards, 4:29.**

**Third quarter**

- HOU – C. J. Stroud 2-yard run (Ka'imi Fairbairn kick), 6:37. Texans 19–3. **Drive: 17 plays, 74 yards, 8:23.**

**Fourth quarter**

- HOU – Jaylin Noel 9-yard pass from C. J. Stroud (Ka'imi Fairbairn kick), 14:09. Texans 26–3. **Drive: 7 plays, 74 yards, 3:01.**

**Top passers**

- HOU – C. J. Stroud – 26/34, 261 yards, TD
- TEN – Cam Ward – 23/36, 170 yards, INT

**Top rushers**

- HOU – Woody Marks – 15 rushes, 62 yards
- TEN – Tony Pollard – 14 rushes, 52 yards

**Top receivers**

- HOU – Xavier Hutchinson – 4 receptions, 65 yards
- TEN – Wan'Dale Robinson – 6 receptions, 53 yards

With their 11th consecutive divisional loss (fourth straight against Houston), the Titans fell to 0–5 for the first time since 2009.

==== Week 6: at Indianapolis Colts ====
Week 6: Tennessee Titans at Indianapolis Colts – Game summary

Quarter	1	2	3	4	Total
**Titans**	0	0	6	20	**26**
Colts	0	13	0	7	**20**

at Lucas Oil Stadium, Indianapolis, Indiana

- Date: October 18
- Game time: 1:00 p.m. EDT/12:00 p.m. CDT
- Game weather: Sunny, 55 °F (13 °C) (retractable roof open)
- Game attendance: 64,273
- Referee: Bill Vinovich
- TV announcers (Fox): Chris Myers, Jonathan Vilma and Megan Olivi
- Recap, Game Book

Game information

**First quarter**

- No scoring plays

**Second quarter**

- IND – Mo Alie-Cox 1-yard pass from Daniel Jones (Spencer Shrader kick), 11:07. Colts 7–0. **Drive: 7 plays, 70 yards, 3:42.**
- IND – Spencer Shrader 23-yard field goal, 2:06. Colts 10–0. **Drive: 13 plays, 75 yards, 6:36.**
- IND – Spencer Shrader 47-yard field goal, 0:11. Colts 13–0. **Drive: 6 plays, 20 yards, 1:39.**

**Third quarter**

- TEN – Joey Slye 29-yard field goal, 13:30. Colts 13–3. **Drive: 7 plays, 22 yards, 1:15.**
- TEN – Joey Slye 56-yard field goal, 3:21. Colts 13–6. **Drive: 9 plays, 51 yards, 3:40.**

**Fourth quarter**

- TEN – Carnell Tate 8-yard pass from Cam Ward (Joey Slye kick), 13:00. Tied 13–13. **Drive: 4 plays, 28 yards, 1:44.**
- TEN – Oluwafemi Oladejo 14-yard return of blocked punt (Joey Slye kick), 10:17. Titans 20–13. **Drive: 5 plays, 8 yards, 2:43.**
- IND – Jonathan Taylor 4-yard run (Spencer Shrader kick), 5:32. Tied 20–20. **Drive: 8 plays, 72 yards, 4:45.**
- TEN – Joey Slye 49-yard field goal, 2:03. Titans 23–20. **Drive: 7 plays, 52 yards, 3:29.**
- TEN – Joey Slye 44-yard field goal, 0:43. Titans 26–20. **Drive; 4 plays, 5 yards, 0:18.**

**Top passers**

- TEN – Cam Ward – 11/22, 102 yards, TD, INT
- IND – Daniel Jones – 22/42, 269 yards, TD, 2 INT

**Top rushers**

- TEN – Tony Pollard – 19 rushes, 76 yards
- IND – Jonathan Taylor – 21 rushes, 94 yards, TD

**Top receivers**

- TEN – Carnell Tate – 6 receptions, 70 yards, TD
- IND – Keenan Allen – 8 receptions, 82 yards

The Titans erased a 13–0 halftime deficit and upset the Colts, 26–20. This marked their first win over Indianapolis since 2022 and their first against the AFC South since Week 12 of 2024. Unfortunately, defensive tackle Jordan Elliott was released days later after bringing a firearm to the team facility the previous Thursday.

==== Week 7: vs. Cleveland Browns ====
Week 7: Cleveland Browns at Tennessee Titans – Game summary

Quarter	1	2	3	4	Total
**Browns**	7	10	0	10	**27**
Titans	14	0	0	10	**24**

at Nissan Stadium, Nashville, Tennessee

- Date: October 25
- Game time: 12:00 p.m. CDT
- Game weather: Sunny, 68 °F (20 °C)
- Game attendance: 63,710
- Referee: Scott Novak
- TV announcers (CBS): Andrew Catalon, Logan Ryan and AJ Ross
- Recap, Game Book

Game information

**First quarter**

- TEN – Tony Pollard 36-yard run (Joey Slye kick), 12:57. Titans 7–0. **Drive: 6 plays, 65 yards, 2:03.**
- TEN – Tony Pollard 10-yard run (Joey Slye kick), 8:35. Titans 14–0. **Drive: 4 plays, 24 yards, 2:06.**
- CLE – Quinshon Judkins 5-yard run (Andre Szmyt kick), 5:32. Titans 14–7. **Drive: 6 plays, 73 yards, 3:03.**

**Second quarter**

- CLE – Quinshon Judkinds 6-yard run (Andre Szmyt kick), 2:17. Tied 14–14. **Drive: 8 plays, 78 yards, 4:44.**
- CLE – Andre Szmyt 28-yard field goal, 0:00. Browns 17–14. **Drive: 10 plays, 64 yards, 1:45.**

**Third quarter**

- No scoring plays

**Fourth quarter**

- TEN – Joey Slye 29-yard field goal, 8:41. Tied 17–17. **Drive: 10 plays, 56 yards, 5:23.**
- CLE – Deshaun Watson 9-yard run (Andre Szmyt kick), 4:34. Browns 24–17. **Drive: 8 plays, 71 yards, 4:07.**
- TEN – Tony Pollard 1-yard run (Joey Slye kick), 0:58. Tied 24–24. **Drive: 11 plays, 63 yards, 3:36.**
- CLE – Andre Szmyt 32-yard field goal, 0:00. Browns 27–24. **Drive: 4 plays, 55 yards, 0:58.**

**Top passers**

- CLE – Deshaun Watson – 25/36, 308 yards, INT
- TEN – Cam Ward – 20/31, 181 yards, INT

**Top rushers**

- CLE – Quinshon Judkins – 17 rushes, 96 yards, 2 TD
- TEN – Tony Pollard – 25 rushes, 129 yards, 3 TD

**Top receivers**

- CLE – KC Concepcion – 8 receptions, 129 yards
- TEN – Carnell Tate – 5 receptions, 69 yards

The Titans tied the 2014-2018 Browns for the most consecutive games without back-to-back wins at 65 games.

==== Week 8: at Cincinnati Bengals ====
Week 8: Tennessee Titans at Cincinnati Bengals – Game summary

Quarter	1	2	3	4	OT	Total
Titans	13	0	8	15	0	**36**
**Bengals**	0	14	9	13	7	**43**

at Paycor Stadium, Cincinnati, Ohio

- Date: November 1
- Game time: 1:00 p.m. EST/12:00 p.m. CST
- Game weather: Cloudy, 72 °F (22 °C)
- Game attendance: 66,209
- Referee: Brad Allen
- TV announcers (CBS): Tom McCarthy, Robert Turbin, and Tiffany Blackmon
- Recap, Game Book

Game information

**First quarter**

- TEN – Joey Slye 46-yard field goal, 10:52. Titans 3–0. **Drive: 10 plays, 52 yards, 4:08.**
- TEN – Tony Pollard 40-yard run (Joey Slye kick), 7:55. Titans 10–0. **Drive: 4 plays, 67 yards, 1:38.**
- TEN – Joey Slye 29-yard field goal, 2:14. Titans 13–0. **Drive: 11 plays, 58 yards, 4:28.**

**Second quarter**

- CIN – Ja'Marr Chase 30-yard pass from Joe Burrow (Evan McPherson kick), 13:20. Titans 13–7. **Drive: 9 plays, 65 yards, 3:54.**
- CIN – Jack Endries 1-yard pass from Joe Burrow (Evan McPherson kick), 0:20. Bengals 14–13. **Drive: 9 plays, 67 yards, 1:52.**

**Third quarter**

- CIN – Tee Higgins 17-yard pass from Joe Burrow (Evan McPherson kick), 12:25. Bengals 21–13. **Drive: 1 play, 17 yards, 0:04.**
- TEN – Tony Pollard 1-yard run (Cam Ward run), 7:47. Tied 21–21. **Drive: 8 plays, 80 yards, 4:38.**
- CIN – Demetrius Knight safety, 0:46. Bengals 23–21.

**Fourth quarter**

- TEN – Chimere Dike 11-yard pass from Cam Ward (Joey Slye kick), 11:29. Titans 28–23. **Drive: 4 plays, 48 yards, 1:55.**
- CIN – Mike Gesicki 25-yard pass from Joe Burrow (pass failed), 7:13. Bengals 29–28. **Drive: 7 plays, 73 yards, 4:16.**
- TEN – Wan'Dale Robinson 15-yard pass from Cam Ward (Cam Ward–Gunnar Helm pass), 3:46. Titans 36–29. **Drive: 8 plays, 68 yards, 3:27.**
- CIN – Tee Higgins 18-yard pass from Joe Burrow (Evan McPherson kick), 1:17. Tied 36–36. **Drive: 7 plays, 81 yards, 2:29.**

**Overtime**

- CIN – Joe Burrow 9-yard run (Evan McPherson kick), 7:00. Bengals 43–36. **Drive: 5 plays, 70 yards, 3:00.**

**Top passers**

- TEN – Cam Ward – 26/40, 304 yards, 2 TD
- CIN – Joe Burrow – 38/48, 462 yards, 5 TD, 3 INT

**Top rushers**

- TEN – Tony Pollard – 21 rushes, 117 yards, 2 TD
- CIN – Chase Brown – 12 rushes, 55 yards

**Top receivers**

- TEN – Gunnar Helm – 5 receptions, 76 yards
- CIN – Tee Higgins – 10 receptions, 155 yards, 2 TD

==== Week 10: vs. Jacksonville Jaguars ====
Week 10: Jacksonville Jaguars at Tennessee Titans – Game summary

Quarter	1	2	3	4	Total
**Jaguars**	7	9	7	17	**40**
Titans	3	7	6	7	**23**

at Nissan Stadium, Nashville, Tennessee

- Date: November 15
- Game time: 12:00 p.m. CST
- Game weather: Sunny, 50 °F (10 °C)
- Game attendance: 61,239
- Referee: Barry Anderson
- TV announcers (Fox): Chris Myers, Mark Schlereth and Jen Hale
- Recap, Game Book

Game information

**First quarter**

- JAX – Parker Washington 2-yard pass from Trevor Lawrence (Cam Little kick), 9:33. Jaguars 7–0. **Drive: 10 plays, 60 yards, 5:27.**
- TEN – Joey Slye 53-yard field goal, 7:04. Jaguars 7–3. **Drive: 8 plays, 31 yards, 2:29.**

**Second quarter**

- JAX – Cam Little 46-yard field goal, 12:54. Jaguars 10–3. **Drive: 10 plays, 52 yards, 5:29.**
- JAX – Cam Little 48-yard field goal, 7:54. Jaguars 13–3. **Drive: 6 plays, 39 yards, 3:13.**
- TEN – Daniel Bellinger 2-yard pass from Cam Ward (Joey Slye kick), 5:06. Jaguars 13–10. **Drive: 6 plays, 67 yards, 2:48.**
- JAX – Cam Little 36-yard field goal, 0:00. Jaguars 16–10. **Drive: 7 plays, 65 yards, 0:58.**

**Third quarter**

- TEN – Joey Slye 54-yard field goal, 12:35. Jaguars 16–13. **Drive: 7 plays, 23 yards, 2:25.**
- JAX – Brenton Strange 3-yard pass from Trevor Lawrence (Cam Little kick), 6:28. Jaguars 23–13. **Drive: 10 plays, 71 yards, 6:07.**
- TEN – Joey Slye 50-yard field goal, 2:13. Jaguars 23–16. **Drive: 10 plays, 49 yards, 4:15.**

**Fourth quarter**

- JAX – Josh Cameron 25-yard pass from Trevor Lawrence (Cam Little kick), 9:44. Jaguars 30–16.
- TEN – Tony Pollard 32-yard pass from Cam Ward (Joey Slye kick), 8:21. Jaguars 30–23. **Drive: 4 plays, 65 yards, 1:23.**
- JAX – Cam Little 40-yard field goal, 4:31. Jaguars 33–23. **Drive: 8 plays, 42 yards, 3:50.**
- JAX – Bhayshul Tuten 6-yard run (Cam Little kick), 1:10. Jaguars 40–23. **Drive: 6 plays, 28 yards, 1:55**

**Top passers**

- JAX – Trevor Lawrence – 25/35, 352 yards, 3 TD, INT
- TEN – Cam Ward – 28/39, 231 yards, 2 TD, INT

**Top rushers**

- JAX – Bhayshul Tuten – 26 rushes, 88 yards, TD
- TEN – Cam Ward – 3 rushes, 39 yards

**Top receivers**

- JAX – Parker Washington – 7 receptions, 152 yards, TD
- TEN – Elic Ayomanor – 5 receptions, 79 yards

==== Week 11: at Dallas Cowboys ====
Week 11: Tennessee Titans at Dallas Cowboys – Game summary

Quarter	1	2	3	4	Total
Titans	3	6	14	7	**30**
**Cowboys**	13	14	14	10	**51**

at AT&T Stadium, Arlington, Texas

- Date: November 22
- Game time: 12:00 p.m. CST
- Game weather: None (retractable roof closed)
- Game attendance: 92,367
- Referee: Clete Blakeman
- TV announcers (Fox): Joe Davis, Greg Olsen, and Pam Oliver
- Recap, Game Book

Game information

**First quarter**

- DAL – Javonte Williams 1-yard rush (pass failed), 8:23. Cowboys 6–0. **Drive: 14 plays, 73 yards, 6:37.**
- TEN – Joey Slye 38-yard field goal, 4:56. Cowboys 6–3. **Drive: 9 plays, 45 yards, 3:27.**
- DAL – KaVontae Turpin 22-yard rush (Brandon Aubrey kick), 1:35. Cowboys 13–3. **Drive: 6 plays, 74 yards, 3:21.**

**Second quarter**

- DAL – CeeDee Lamb 8-yard pass from Dak Prescott (Brandon Aubrey kick), 12:59. Cowboys 20–3. **Drive: 5 plays, 56 yards, 1:48.**
- TEN – Joey Slye 48-yard field goal, 10:34. Cowboys 20–6. **Drive: 6 plays, 18 yards, 2:25.**
- DAL – George Pickens 11-yard pass from Dak Prescott (Brandon Aubrey kick), 8:58. Cowboys 27–6. **Drive: 5 plays, 56 yards, 1:48.**
- TEN – Joey Slye 28-yard field goal, 0:00. Cowboys 27–9. **Drive: 12 plays, 63 yards, 4:08.**

**Third quarter**

- TEN – Cam Ward 1-yard rush (Joey Slye kick), 13:08. Cowboys 27–16. **Drive: 4 plays, 71 yards, 1:52.**
- DAL – Javonte Williams 11-yard pass from Dak Prescott (Brandon Aubrey kick), 8:58. Cowboys 34–16. **Drive: 7 plays, 71 yards, 4:10.**
- TEN – Carnell Tate 59-yard pass from Cam Ward (Joey Slye kick), 7:19. Cowboys 34–23. **Drive: 2 plays, 68 yards, 1:39.**
- DAL – Dak Prescott 2-yard rush (Brandon Aubrey kick), 4:17. Cowboys 41–23. **Drive: 6 plays, 74 yards, 3:02.**

**Fourth quarter**

- DAL – Brandon Aubrey 49-yard field goal, 11:33. Cowboys 44–23. **Drive: 11 plays, 60 yards, 5:30.**
- DAL – Brevyn Spann-Ford 2-yard pass from Dak Prescott (Brandon Aubrey kick), 4:59. Cowboys 51–23. **Drive: 3 plays, 15 yards, 1:29.**
- TEN – Calvin Ridley 12-yard pass from Cam Ward (Joey Slye kick), 0:31. Cowboys 51–30. **Drive: 12 plays, 72 yards, 4:28.**

**Top passers**

- TEN – Cam Ward – 21/30, 248 yards, 2 TD
- DAL – Dak Prescott – 28/33, 325 yards, 4 TD

**Top rushers**

- TEN – Tony Pollard – 21 rushes, 110 yards
- DAL – Javonte Williams – 18 rushes, 67 yards, TD

**Top receivers**

- TEN – Chimere Dike – 6 receptions, 69 yards
- DAL – CeeDee Lamb – 11 receptions, 132 yards, TD

==== Week 12: at Jacksonville Jaguars ====
Week 12: Tennessee Titans at Jacksonville Jaguars – Game summary

Quarter	1	2	3	4	Total
Titans	0	0	0	0	**0**
Jaguars	0	0	0	0	**0**

at EverBank Stadium, Jacksonville, Florida

- Date: November 29
- Game time: 1:00 p.m. EST/12:00 p.m. CST
- TV: Fox
- Preview

=== Standings ===
==== Division ====
AFC South
	W	L	T	PCT	DIV	CONF	PF	PA	STK
Jacksonville Jaguars	7	2	0	.778	2–1	6–2	269	144	W3
Houston Texans	4	6	0	.400	3–1	4–4	259	222	W1
Indianapolis Colts	3	8	0	.273	1–3	2–6	211	297	L1
Tennessee Titans	1	9	0	.100	1–2	1–6	197	290	L4

==== Conference ====
AFC
Seed	Team	Division	W	L	T	PCT	DIV	CONF	SOS	SOV	STK
**Division leaders**
1	Buffalo Bills	East	9	1	0	.900	2–1	6–1	.424	.416	W6
2	Kansas City Chiefs	West	8	2	0	.800	3–1	6–1	.374	.300	W3
3 (Note: Jacksonville wins tie break over Cincinnati based on head-to-head victory.)	Jacksonville Jaguars	South	7	2	0	.778	2–1	6–2	.444	.408	W3
4	Cincinnati Bengals	North	7	2	0	.778	2–1	5–2	.389	.310	W5
**Wild cards**
5	Denver Broncos	West	7	2	0	.778	2–1	3–1	.591	.522	W5
6 (Note: Cleveland wins tie break over Pittsburgh based on division record.)	Cleveland Browns	North	6	4	0	.600	2–1	4–3	.410	.377	W1
7	Pittsburgh Steelers	North	6	4	0	.600	2–2	3–3	.465	.417	L2
**In the hunt**
8	New England Patriots	East	5	5	0	.500	3–0	5–1	.576	.440	L2
9 (Note: Houston wins tie break over Las Vegas based on strength of victory.)	Houston Texans	South	4	6	0	.400	3–1	4–4	.480	.308	W1
10	Las Vegas Raiders	West	4	6	0	.400	1–1	3–3	.500	.179	L2
11	Baltimore Ravens	North	4	7	0	.364	0–2	2–5	.459	.286	L6
12	Indianapolis Colts	South	3	8	0	.273	1–3	2–6	.463	.293	L1
13	New York Jets	East	2	8	0	.200	0–3	2–5	.560	.350	L5
14	Los Angeles Chargers	West	1	8	0	.111	0–3	1–5	.560	.364	W1
15 (Note: Tennessee wins tie break over Miami based on strength of victory.)	Tennessee Titans	South	1	9	0	.100	1–2	1–6	.465	.273	L4
16	Miami Dolphins	East	1	9	0	.100	1–2	1–6	.622	.200	L4
