= 2025 Tennessee Titans season =

66th season in franchise history

- Owner: KSA Industries
- General manager: Mike Borgonzi
- Head coach: Brian Callahan (fired October 13, 1–5 record); Mike McCoy (interim, 2–9 record)
- Home stadium: Nissan Stadium

Results
- Record: 3–14
- Division place: 4th AFC South
- Playoffs: Did not qualify
- All-Pros: DT Jeffery Simmons (1st team); PR Chimere Dike (1st team) (Note: Selected as a punt returner)
- Pro Bowlers: DT Jeffery Simmons; RS Chimere Dike

Uniform
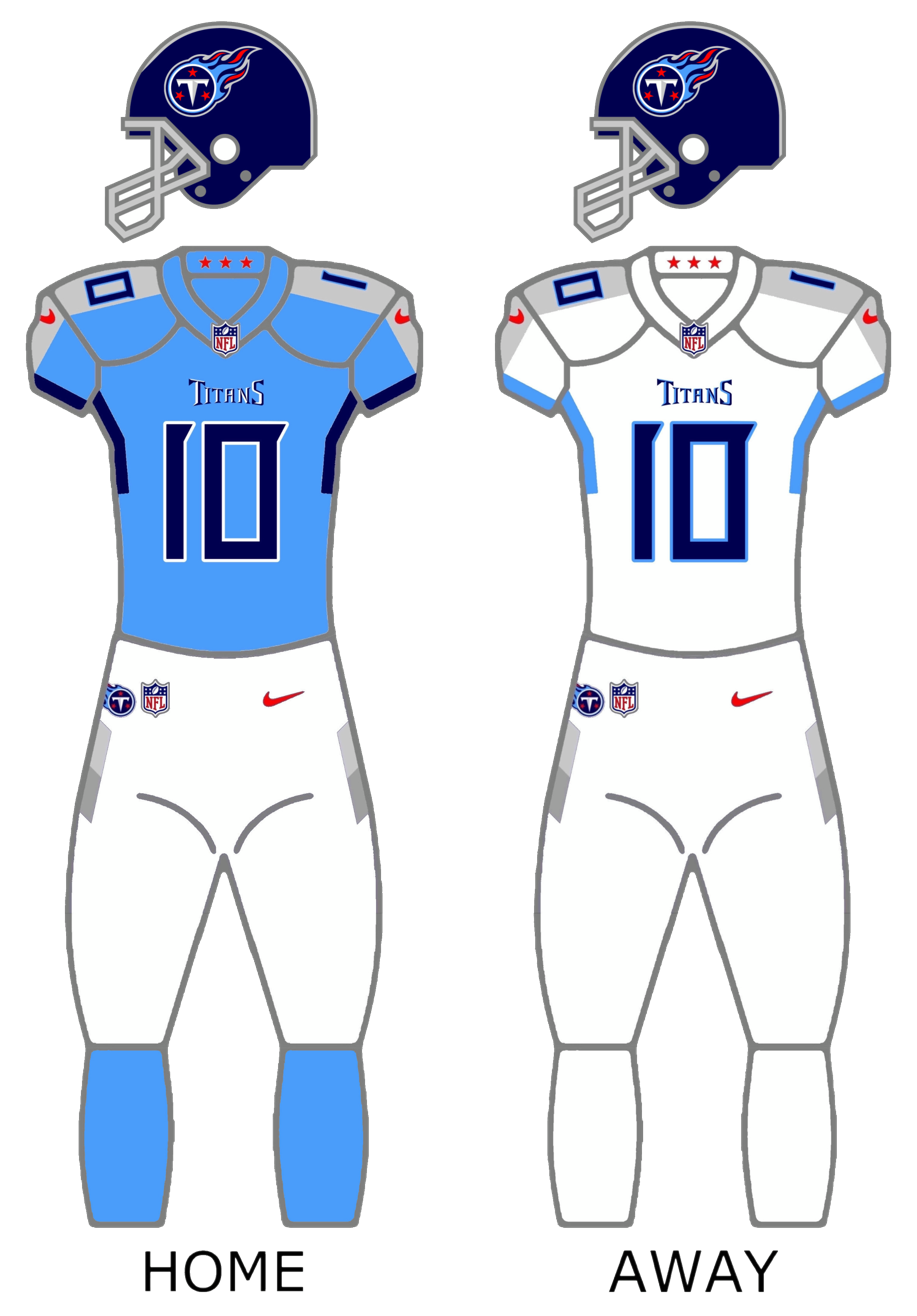

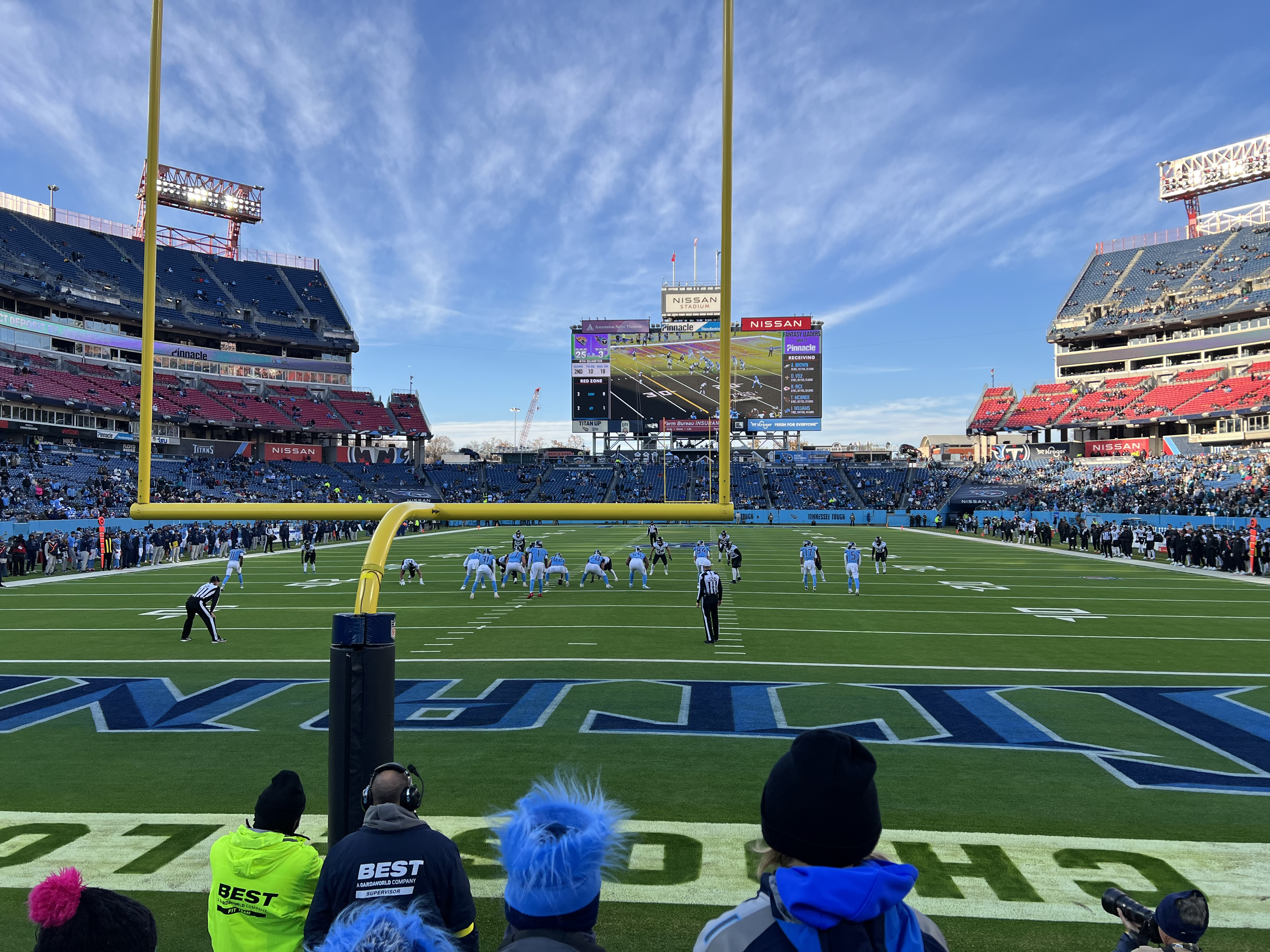
The Tennessee Titans vs. the Jacksonville Jaguars in Nissan Stadium during Week 13.

The 2025 season was the Tennessee Titans' 56th in the National Football League (NFL), their 66th overall, their 29th in the state of Tennessee, their first under the leadership of a new general manager Mike Borgonzi, and their second and final under head coach Brian Callahan. The Titans held the first overall pick in the 2025 NFL draft, their first time holding it since 2016, which they used to draft Miami Hurricanes quarterback Cam Ward. The team matched their 3–14 record from the 2024 season. Their primary starting quarterback the previous two years, Will Levis, went through shoulder surgery in the offseason.

The Titans started the season 1–11, the worst start for the franchise since they also started 1–11 in 1994 when they were known as the Houston Oilers. They were eliminated from playoff contention for the fourth consecutive season in Week 13 after losing to the arch rival Jacksonville Jaguars. This season began with the team's third general manager in four seasons. On October 13, Callahan was relieved of his duties with Mike McCoy being named interim head coach for the remainder of the season. This is Mike McCoy's second head coaching job; he was previously the head coach of the San Diego Chargers from 2013 to 2016. The Titans placed last in the AFC South for the third consecutive season, and this was their fourth consecutive losing season. The Titans had a four-year aggregate record of 19–49 (.279) from 2022 to 2025, the worst four-year stretch in the team's history since they went 15–49 (.234) from 1983 to 1986, when they were the Houston Oilers.

== Offseason ==
=== Roster changes ===
==== Reserve/futures free agent contracts ====
On January 6, 2025, the Titans signed 12 players from their practice squad to reserve/futures contracts.

Player	Position
McTelvin Agim	DT
Abdullah Anderson	DT
Curtis Bolton	LB
Chandler Brewer	OT
Isaiah Iton	DT
Gabe Jeudy-Lally	DB
Kyron Johnson	LB
Stanley Morgan Jr.	WR
Thomas Odukoya	TE
Gervarrius Owens	DB
Isaiah Prince	OT
Jabari Small	RB

== Draft ==
2025 Tennessee Titans draft selections
Round	Selection	Player	Position	College	Notes
1	1	Cam Ward	QB	Miami (FL)	
2	35	Traded to the Seattle Seahawks			
2	52	Oluwafemi Oladejo	OLB	UCLA	From Seattle Seahawks
3	66	Traded to the Kansas City Chiefs (Note: The Titans traded a third-round selection (66th overall) and a 2024 seventh-round selection to the Kansas City Chiefs in exchange for a 2024 seventh-round selection and CB L'Jarius Sneed.)			
3	82	Kevin Winston Jr.	S	Penn State	From Seattle Seahawks
4	103	Chimere Dike	WR	Florida	
4	120	Gunnar Helm	TE	Texas	From Seahawks (Note: The Titans traded LB Ernest Jones to Seattle in exchange for a fourth-round selection (120th overall) and LB Jerome Baker.)
4	136	Elic Ayomanor	WR	Stanford	From Baltimore
5	141	Traded to the Baltimore Ravens			
5	167	Jackson Slater	G	Sacramento State	From Chiefs (Note: The Titans traded WR DeAndre Hopkins to Kansas City in exchange for a conditional fifth-round selection (167th overall). The condition – that Tennessee would receive a fifth-round pick if the Chiefs failed to advance to Super Bowl LIX or Hopkins played in less than 60% of the Chiefs' snaps – was converted at the end of the regular season, when Hopkins played in less than 50% of the Chiefs' 2024 snaps following the trade.)
6	178	Traded to the Baltimore Ravens			
6	183	Marcus Harris	CB	California	From Baltimore
6	188	Kalel Mullings	RB	Michigan	From Dallas
7	217	Traded to the New England Patriots (Note: The Titans traded a seventh-round selection to New England in exchange for K Nick Folk.)			
7	239	Traded to the Dallas Cowboys			

2025 Tennessee Titans undrafted free agents
Name	Position	College	Ref.
Micah Bernard	RB	Utah	
Philip Blidi	DT	Auburn	
Brandon Crenshaw-Dickson	OL	Florida	
Desmond Evans	OLB	North Carolina	
David Gbenda	LB	Texas	
Jermari Harris	CB	Iowa	
Garnett Hollis Jr.	DB	Western Kentucky	
Cam Horsley	DL	Boston College	
Jalen Kimber	DB	Penn State	
Virgil Lemons	DB	West Florida	
Clarence Lewis	DB	Syracuse	
Devonte O'Malley	DL	Northern Illinois	
Isaiah Raikes	DL	Auburn	
Xavier Restrepo	WR	Miami (FL)	
Davion Ross	DB	Memphis	
Jerrin Thompson	DB	Auburn	
Drake Dabney	TE	TCU	
TJ Sheffield	WR	UConn	

Free Agency and Trades

== Personnel ==
=== Staff ===
2025 Tennessee Titans staff
Front office: Owner – KSA Industries; Controlling owner – Amy Adams Strunk; President/CEO – Burke Nihill; President of football operations – Chad Brinker; General manager – Mike Borgonzi; Assistant general manager – Dave Ziegler; Senior vice president of football administration/player finance – Vin Marino; Director of football administration - Leland Taylor; Vice president of player personnel - Dan Saganey; Director of player personnel – Jon Salge; Assistant directors of college scouting – Dale Thompson, Mike Boni; Director of pro personnel – Kevin Turks; Vice president/football advisor – Reggie McKenzie; Director, football strategy - Scott Cohen; Director, football research and development – Sarah Bailey; Coordinator, football research and development - Erin Psajdl Davis; Director, Game Management and Strategic Initiatives - Rob Riederer; Head coaches: Head coach – Brian Callahan (fired October 13, 1–5 record); Interim head coach – Mike McCoy; Offensive coaches: Offensive coordinator – Nick Holz; Quarterbacks – Bo Hardegree; Assistant quarterbacks – Payton McCollum; Running backs – Randy Jordan; Wide receivers – Tyke Tolbert; Tight ends – Luke Stocker; Interim offensive line – Scott Fuchs; Offensive assistant – Trevor Browder; Offensive assistant – Kylan Butler; Offensive assistant – Matt Jones	Defensive coaches: Defensive coordinator – Dennard Wilson; Defensive run game coordinator – Travis Smith; Defensive line – Tracy Rocker; Linebackers – Frank Bush; Outside linebackers – Ben Bloom; Passing game coordinator/cornerbacks – Tony Oden; Secondary/safeties − Steve Jackson; Assistant defensive backs – Steve Donatell; Defensive assistant – Lori Locust; Defensive quality control – Dylan Autenrieth; Special teams coaches: Special teams coordinator – John Fassel; Assistant special teams – Rayna Stewart; Assistant to the head coach – Tom Jones; Strength and conditioning: Director of sports performance – Zac Woodfin; Assistant director of sports performance – Brian Bell; Assistant strength and conditioning – Mark Lovat; Assistant strength and conditioning – Grant Thorne; Sports performance assistant – Haley Roberts; Assistant sports performance: speed training – John Shaw

=== Final roster ===
2025 Tennessee Titans roster
Quarterbacks (QB): 10 Brandon Allen; 1 Cam Ward; Running backs (RB): 36 Julius Chestnut; 28 Kalel Mullings; 20 Tony Pollard; 2 Tyjae Spears; Wide receivers (WR): 5 Elic Ayomanor; 17 Chimere Dike; 12 Mason Kinsey; 80 Bryce Oliver; 13 James Proche; Tight ends (TE): 84 Gunnar Helm; 88 David Martin-Robinson; 85 Chig Okonkwo	Offensive linemen (OL): 78 Brandon Crenshaw-Dickson RT; 79 Lloyd Cushenberry C; 71 Garrett Dellinger G; 55 JC Latham RT; 62 Corey Levin LG; 75 Dan Moore LT; 67 Drew Moss G; 77 Peter Skoronski LG; 64 Jackson Slater RG; 72 Oli Udoh LT; 70 Kevin Zeitler RG; Defensive linemen (DL): 68 Cam Horsley NT; 69 Sebastian Joseph-Day DE; 97 James Lynch DE; 91 C. J. Ravenell DE; 98 Jeffery Simmons DT; 93 T'Vondre Sweat NT	Linebackers (LB): 48 Joe Bachie ILB; 50 Cody Barton ILB; 99 Ali Gaye OLB; 33 Cedric Gray ILB; 92 Jaylen Harrell OLB; 56 Truman Jones OLB; 49 Arden Key OLB; 54 Dorian Mausi ILB; 53 Jihad Ward OLB; 52 James Williams ILB; Defensive backs (DB): 39 Darrell Baker Jr. CB; 30 Kendell Brooks CB; 35 Kaiir Elam CB; 40 Kemon Hall CB; 41 Erick Hallett S; 37 Amani Hooker SS; 42 Sanoussi Kane S; 28 Jerrick Reed II S; 21 Micah Robinson CB; Special teams (ST): 46 Morgan Cox LS; 3 Johnny Hekker P; 6 Joey Slye K	Practice squad: 58 David Agoha DE (IPP); 66 Chandler Brewer RT; 29 Keydrain Calligan CB; 94 Timmy Horne NT; 45 Nate Lynn OLB; 82 Lance McCutcheon WR; 24 Jordan Mims RB; 61 John Ojukwu RT; 81 Hal Presley WR; 76 Isaiah Raikes NT; 87 Xavier Restrepo WR; 47 Cam Riley ILB; 15 Trevor Siemian QB; 86 Cole Turner TE; 96 Carlos Watkins DE; 32 Blake Watson RB (PS/I); 60 Clay Webb G; 83 Joel Wilson TE (PS/I); Reserve: 18 Jalyn Armour-Davis CB (IR); 44 Mike Brown FS (IR); 73 Blake Hance RG (IR); 26 Marcus Harris CB (IR); 11 Van Jefferson WR (IR); 8 Will Levis QB (IR); 7 Oluwafemi Oladejo OLB (IR); 59 Anfernee Orji OLB (IR); 0 Calvin Ridley WR (IR); 38 L'Jarius Sneed CB (IR); 23 Kevin Winston Jr. FS (IR); 25 Xavier Woods FS (IR); Rookies in italics 53 active, 12 reserve, 16 practice squad (2 exempt)

=== Team captains ===
2025 Tennessee Titans team captains
Name	Position	Ref.
Cam Ward	QB	
Tony Pollard	RB	
Calvin Ridley	WR	
Jeffery Simmons	DT	
Cody Barton	LB	
Amani Hooker	S	
Morgan Cox	LS	

== Preseason ==
Week	Date	Opponent	Result	Record	Venue	Recap
1	August 9	at Tampa Bay Buccaneers	L 7–29	0–1	Raymond James Stadium	Recap
2	August 15	at Atlanta Falcons	W 23–20	1–1	Mercedes-Benz Stadium	Recap
3	August 22	Minnesota Vikings	W 23–13	2–1	Nissan Stadium	Recap

== Regular season ==
=== Schedule ===
Week	Date	Opponent	Result	Record	Venue	Recap
1	September 7	at Denver Broncos	**L** 12–20	0–1	Empower Field at Mile High	Recap
2	September 14	Los Angeles Rams	**L** 19–33	0–2	Nissan Stadium	Recap
3	September 21	**Indianapolis Colts**	**L** 20–41	0–3	Nissan Stadium	Recap
4	September 28	at **Houston Texans**	**L** 0–26	0–4	NRG Stadium	Recap
5	October 5	at Arizona Cardinals	**W** 22–21	1–4	State Farm Stadium	Recap
6	October 12	at Las Vegas Raiders	**L** 10–20	1–5	Allegiant Stadium	Recap
7	October 19	New England Patriots	**L** 13–31	1–6	Nissan Stadium	Recap
8	October 26	at **Indianapolis Colts**	**L** 14–38	1–7	Lucas Oil Stadium	Recap
9	November 2	Los Angeles Chargers	**L** 20–27	1–8	Nissan Stadium	Recap
10	Bye					
11	November 16	**Houston Texans**	**L** 13–16	1–9	Nissan Stadium	Recap
12	November 23	Seattle Seahawks	**L** 24–30	1–10	Nissan Stadium	Recap
13	November 30	**Jacksonville Jaguars**	**L** 3–25	1–11	Nissan Stadium	Recap
14	December 7	at Cleveland Browns	**W** 31–29	2–11	Huntington Bank Field	Recap
15	December 14	at San Francisco 49ers	**L** 24–37	2–12	Levi's Stadium	Recap
16	December 21	Kansas City Chiefs	**W** 26–9	3–12	Nissan Stadium	Recap
17	December 28	New Orleans Saints	**L** 26–34	3–13	Nissan Stadium	Recap
18	January 4	at **Jacksonville Jaguars**	**L** 7–41	3–14	EverBank Stadium	Recap

Note: Intra-division opponents are in bold text.

=== Game summaries ===
==== Week 1: at Denver Broncos ====
Week 1: Tennessee Titans at Denver Broncos – Game summary

Quarter	1	2	3	4	Total
Titans	3	6	3	0	**12**
**Broncos**	3	7	3	7	**20**

at Empower Field at Mile High, Denver, Colorado

- Date: September 7
- Game time: 3:05 p.m. CDT/2:05 p.m. MDT
- Game weather: Mostly sunny, 84 °F (29 °C)
- Game attendance: 73,747
- Referee: Alex Kemp
- TV announcers (Fox): Adam Amin, Mark Sanchez and Kristina Pink
- Recap, Game Book

Game information

**First quarter**

- TEN – Joey Slye 50-yard field goal, 11:58. Titans 3–0. **Drive: 7 plays, 33 yards, 3:02.**
- DEN – Wil Lutz 39-yard field goal, 8:35. Tied 3–3. **Drive: 10 plays, 44 yards, 3:23.**

**Second quarter**

- TEN – Joey Slye 33-yard field goal, 2:16. Titans 6–3. **Drive: 8 plays, 23 yards, 4:47.**
- DEN – Courtland Sutton 22-yard pass from Bo Nix (Wil Lutz kick), 0:16. Broncos 10–6. **Drive: 1 play, 38 yards, 0:11.**
- TEN – Joey Slye 42-yard field goal, 0:02. Broncos 10–9. **Drive: 1 play, 0 yards, 0:14.**

**Third quarter**

- TEN – Joey Slye 35-yard field goal, 11:56. Titans 12–10. **Drive: 4 plays, 9 yards, 2:09.**
- DEN – Wil Lutz 33-yard field goal, 4:17. Broncos 13–12. **Drive: 13 plays, 48 yards, 7:39.**

**Fourth quarter**

- DEN – J. K. Dobbins 19-yard run (Wil Lutz kick), 7:37. Broncos 20–12. **Drive: 4 plays, 80 yards, 1:45.**

**Top passers**

- TEN – Cam Ward – 12/28, 112 yards
- DEN – Bo Nix – 25/40, 176 yards, TD, 2 INT

**Top rushers**

- TEN – Tony Pollard – 18 rushes, 60 yards
- DEN – RJ Harvey – 6 rushes, 70 yards

**Top receivers**

- TEN – Tony Pollard – 1 reception, 29 yards
- DEN – Courtland Sutton – 6 receptions, 61 yards, TD

This was Titans rookie quarterback Cam Ward's first game in the NFL. He could not do anything, as he threw no touchdowns, no interceptions, 112 yards, and completed just 42.9% of his passes to go with his 54.5 passer rating. With the loss, the Titans started their season 0–1. Because the Colts beat the Dolphins 33–8, the Titans now hold the NFL's longest active season opener losing streak, not having won a season opener since 2020. The Titans' 12 points were the fewest in a season opener since they scored 10 in a 13–10 overtime loss on the road to the Steelers in 2009.

==== Week 2: vs. Los Angeles Rams ====
Week 2: Los Angeles Rams at Tennessee Titans – Game summary

Quarter	1	2	3	4	Total
**Rams**	7	3	10	13	**33**
Titans	0	13	3	3	**19**

at Nissan Stadium, Nashville, Tennessee

- Date: September 14
- Game time: 12:00 p.m. CDT
- Game weather: Cloudy, 83 °F (28 °C)
- Game attendance: 59,069
- Referee: John Hussey
- TV announcers (CBS): Ian Eagle, J. J. Watt and Evan Washburn
- Recap, Game Book

Game information

**First quarter**

- LAR – Puka Nacua 45-yard run (Joshua Karty kick), 8:39. Rams 7–0. **Drive: 6 plays, 72 yards, 3:23.**

**Second quarter**

- TEN – Joey Slye 55-yard field goal, 11:21. Rams 7–3. **Drive: 11 plays, 48 yards, 6:39.**
- LAR – Joshua Karty 21-yard field goal, 7:25. Rams 10–3. **Drive: 10 plays, 72 yards, 3:56.**
- TEN – Elic Ayomanor 9-yard pass from Cam Ward (Joey Slye kick), 0:38. Tied 10–10. **Drive: 10 plays, 56 yards, 2:30.**
- TEN – Joey Slye 37-yard field goal, 0:00. Titans 13–10. **Drive: 3 plays, 27 yards, 0:27.**

**Third quarter**

- LAR – Joshua Karty 21-yard field goal, 9:29. Tied 13–13. **Drive: 11 plays, 62 yards, 5:31.**
- TEN – Joey Slye 57-yard field goal, 3:32. Titans 16–13. **Drive: 11 plays, 35 yards, 5:57.**
- LAR – Davis Allen 8-yard pass from Matthew Stafford (Joshua Karty kick), 1:17. Rams 20–16. **Drive: 4 plays, 69 yards, 2:15.**

**Fourth quarter**

- LAR – Davante Adams 16-yard pass from Matthew Stafford (Joshua Karty kick), 9:40. Rams 27–16. **Drive: 3 plays, 21 yards, 1:29.**
- LAR – Blake Corum 1-yard run (kick blocked), 6:45. Rams 33–16. **Drive: 5 plays, 66 yards, 2:23.**
- TEN – Joey Slye 35-yard field goal, 2:40. Rams 33–19. **Drive: 12 plays, 48 yards, 4:05.**

**Top passers**

- LAR – Matthew Stafford – 23/33, 298 yards, 2 TD, INT
- TEN – Cam Ward – 19/33, 175 yards, TD

**Top rushers**

- LAR – Kyren Williams – 17 rushes, 66 yards
- TEN – Tony Pollard – 20 rushes, 92 yards

**Top receivers**

- LAR – Davante Adams – 6 receptions, 106 yards, TD
- TEN – Calvin Ridley – 3 receptions, 57 yards

With the loss, the Titans fell to 0–2 for the second consecutive season, the first time they have started 0–2 in consecutive seasons since 1983 and 1984, when the franchise was based in Houston. Cam Ward looked slightly better than in his first game by throwing 175 yards, 1 touchdown, and no interceptions, but also completed just 57.6 percent of his passes to go with his 82.3 passer rating. The Titans' 31 points were the fewest through their first two games of a season since they scored 27 in their first two games in 2022.

==== Week 3: vs. Indianapolis Colts ====
Week 3: Indianapolis Colts at Tennessee Titans – Game summary

Quarter	1	2	3	4	Total
**Colts**	17	3	14	7	**41**
Titans	3	3	7	7	**20**

at Nissan Stadium, Nashville, Tennessee

- Date: September 21
- Game time: 12:00 p.m. CDT
- Game weather: Cloudy, 84 °F (29 °C)
- Game attendance: 56,361
- Referee: Scott Novak
- TV announcers (CBS): Tom McCarthy, Ross Tucker and Amanda Balionis
- Recap, Game Book

Game information

**First quarter**

- IND – Kenny Moore II 32-yard interception return (Spencer Shrader kick), 14:11. Colts 7–0.
- TEN – Joey Slye 57-yard field goal, 12:40. Colts 7–3. **Drive: 5 plays, 21 yards, 1:31.**
- IND – Spencer Shrader 24-yard field goal, 7:37. Colts 10–3. **Drive: 9 plays, 59 yards, 5:03.**
- IND – Jonathan Taylor 1-yard run (Spencer Shrader kick), 1:07. Colts 17–3. **Drive: 9 plays, 77 yards, 4:09.**

**Second quarter**

- TEN – Joey Slye 42-yard field goal, 10:50. Colts 17–6. **Drive: 11 plays, 54 yards, 5:17.**
- IND – Spencer Shrader 36-yard field goal, 0:00. Colts 20–6. **Drive: 5 plays, 30 yards, 0:37.**

**Third quarter**

- IND – Michael Pittman Jr. 20-yard pass from Daniel Jones (Spencer Shrader kick), 11:08. Colts 27–6. **Drive: 6 plays, 67 yards, 3:52.**
- TEN – Tony Pollard 1-yard run (Joey Slye kick), 5:09. Colts 27–13. **Drive: 13 plays, 73 yards, 5:59.**
- IND – Jonathan Taylor 46-yard run (Spencer Shrader kick), 1:27. Colts 34–13. **Drive: 7 plays, 80 yards, 3:42.**

**Fourth quarter**

- TEN – Elic Ayomanor 8-yard pass from Cam Ward (Joey Slye kick), 8:40. Colts 34–20. **Drive: 16 plays, 77 yards, 7:47.**
- IND – Jonathan Taylor 1-yard run (Spencer Shrader kick), 5:53. Colts 41–20. **Drive: 5 plays, 58 yards, 2:47.**

**Top passers**

- IND – Daniel Jones – 18/25, 228 yards, TD
- TEN – Cam Ward – 23/38, 219 yards, TD, INT

**Top rushers**

- IND – Jonathan Taylor – 17 rushes, 102 yards, 3 TD
- TEN – Tony Pollard – 16 rushes, 45 yards, TD

**Top receivers**

- IND – Michael Pittman Jr. – 6 receptions, 73 yards, TD
- TEN – Chig Okonkwo – 5 receptions, 66 yards

With their 5th straight loss to the Colts since 2023, the Titans dropped to 0–3 on the season. Cam Ward regressed from his previous game by throwing 219 yards, 1 touchdown, 1 interception, and completed just 60.5 percent of his passes to go with his 74.3 passer rating.

==== Week 4: at Houston Texans ====
Week 4: Tennessee Titans at Houston Texans – Game summary

Quarter	1	2	3	4	Total
Titans	0	0	0	0	**0**
**Texans**	3	3	0	20	**26**

at NRG Stadium, Houston, Texas

- Date: September 28
- Game time: 12:00 p.m. CDT
- Game weather: None (retractable roof closed)
- Game attendance: 70,398
- Referee: Brad Rogers
- TV announcers (CBS): Beth Mowins, Ross Tucker and Amanda Balionis
- Recap, Game Book

Game information

**First quarter**

- HOU – Ka'imi Fairbairn 47-yard field goal, 4:49. Texans 3–0. **Drive: 11 plays, 40 yards, 6:52.**

**Second quarter**

- HOU – Ka'imi Fairbairn 43-yard field goal, 13:28. Texans 6–0. **Drive: 11 plays, 60 yards, 4:37.**

**Third quarter**

- No scoring plays

**Fourth quarter**

- HOU – Woody Marks 12-yard pass from C. J. Stroud (pass failed), 14:55. Texans 12–0. **Drive: 13 plays, 82 yards, 7:51.**
- HOU – Jayden Higgins 24-yard pass from C. J. Stroud (Ka'imi Fairbairn kick), 9:26. Texans 19–0. **Drive: 6 plays, 44 yards, 3:12.**
- HOU – Woody Marks 18-yard run (Ka'imi Fairbairn kick), 4:51. Texans 26–0. **Drive: 4 plays, 31 yards, 1:57.**

**Top passers**

- TEN – Cam Ward – 10/26, 108 yards, INT
- HOU – C. J. Stroud – 22/28, 233 yards, 2 TD

**Top rushers**

- TEN – Tony Pollard – 14 rushes, 64 yards
- HOU – Woody Marks – 17 rushes, 69 yards, TD

**Top receivers**

- TEN – Elic Ayomanor – 2 receptions, 44 yards
- HOU – Nico Collins – 4 receptions, 79 yards

This was the Titans' first shutout loss since the 2019 season. Cam Ward continued to struggle by throwing just 108 yards, no touchdown, 1 interception, and completed just 38.5 percent of his passes to go with his 35.4 passer rating.

==== Week 5: at Arizona Cardinals ====
Week 5: Tennessee Titans at Arizona Cardinals – Game summary

Quarter	1	2	3	4	Total
**Titans**	3	3	0	16	**22**
Cardinals	14	7	0	0	**21**

at State Farm Stadium, Glendale, Arizona

- Date: October 5
- Game time: 3:05 p.m. CDT/1:05 p.m. MST
- Game weather: None (retractable roof closed)
- Game attendance: 64,280
- Referee: Shawn Smith
- TV announcers (CBS): Spero Dedes, Adam Archuleta and Aditi Kinkhabwala
- Recap, Game Book

Game information

**First quarter**

- ARI – Michael Carter 1-yard run (Chad Ryland kick), 10:54. Cardinals 7–0. **Drive: 8 plays, 67 yards, 4:06.**
- TEN – Joey Slye 44-yard field goal, 5:00. Cardinals 7–3. **Drive: 12 plays, 44 yards, 5:54.**
- ARI – Kyler Murray 12-yard run (Chad Ryland kick), 0:39. Cardinals 14–3. **Drive: 7 plays, 65 yards, 4:21.**

**Second quarter**

- ARI – Bam Knight 1-yard run (Chad Ryland kick), 10:43. Cardinals 21–3. **Drive: 4 plays, 27 yards, 1:32.**
- TEN – Joey Slye 51-yard field goal, 8:29. Cardinals 21–6. **Drive: 4 plays, 1 yard, 2:14.**

**Third quarter**

- No scoring plays

**Fourth quarter**

- TEN – Tony Pollard 1-yard run (kick failed), 10:26. Cardinals 21–12. **Drive: 6 plays, 80 yards, 2:14.**
- TEN – Tyler Lockett fumble recovery in end zone (Joey Slye kick), 4:39. Cardinals 21–19. **Drive: 8 plays, 61 yards, 4:06.**
- TEN – Joey Slye 29-yard field goal, 0:00. Titans 22–21. **Drive: 11 plays, 71 yards, 1:53.**

**Top passers**

- TEN – Cam Ward – 21/39, 265 yards, INT
- ARI – Kyler Murray – 23/31, 220 yards

**Top rushers**

- TEN – Tony Pollard – 14 rushes, 67 yards, TD
- ARI – Emari Demercado – 3 rushes, 81 yards

**Top receivers**

- TEN – Calvin Ridley – 5 receptions, 131 yards
- ARI – Marvin Harrison Jr. – 4 receptions, 98 yards

The Titans overcame a 21–3 deficit, ultimately winning on a 29-yard field goal by kicker Joey Slye as time expired to upset the Cardinals 22–21, snapping a 10-game losing streak dating back to the previous season. A notable play occurred when Cardinals safety Dadrion Taylor-Demerson intercepted a pass from quarterback Cam Ward but immediately fumbled the ball. Titans receiver Tyler Lockett recovered it in the end zone, narrowing the Cardinals' lead to 21–19 with 4:51 remaining.

With the upset victory, the Titans improved to 1–4, and Cam Ward earned his first NFL win. He finished the day with a season-high 265 passing yards, but he also threw no touchdowns, 1 interception, and completed just 53.8 percent of his passes to go with his 64.6 passer rating. It was also the Titans’ first win in Arizona since the 1997 season, when the franchise was known as the Tennessee Oilers. The Titans' 73 points scored through their first 5 games were their fewest since they scored just 60 points in their first 5 games in 2006.

This would also turn out to be Brian Callahan's final NFL win as Titans head coach, as he was fired following Tennessee's loss the next week against the Las Vegas Raiders.

==== Week 6: at Las Vegas Raiders ====
Week 6: Tennessee Titans at Las Vegas Raiders – Game summary

Quarter	1	2	3	4	Total
Titans	0	0	3	7	**10**
**Raiders**	3	7	7	3	**20**

at Allegiant Stadium, Paradise, Nevada

- Date: October 12
- Game time: 3:05 p.m. CDT/1:05 p.m. PDT
- Game weather: None (indoor stadium)
- Game attendance: 61,981
- Referee: Carl Cheffers
- TV announcers (Fox): Kenny Albert, Jonathan Vilma and Megan Olivi
- Recap, Game Book

Game information

**First quarter**

- LV – Daniel Carlson 50-yard field goal, 4:07. Raiders 3–0. **Drive: 13 plays, 48 yards, 8:44.**

**Second quarter**

- LV – Michael Mayer 4-yard pass from Geno Smith (Daniel Carlson kick), 5:13. Raiders 10–0. **Drive: 3 plays, 2 yards, 0:55.**

**Third quarter**

- LV – Ashton Jeanty 3-yard run (Daniel Carlson kick), 7:04. Raiders 17–0. **Drive: 13 plays, 70 yards, 7:56.**
- TEN – Matthew Wright 46-yard field goal, 1:06. Raiders 17–3. **Drive: 8 plays, 51 yards, 5:58.**

**Fourth quarter**

- LV – Daniel Carlson 29-yard field goal, 7:14. Raiders 20–3. **Drive: 8 plays, 60 yards, 5:32.**
- TEN – David Martin-Robinson 1-yard pass from Cam Ward (Matthew Wright kick), 3:03. Raiders 20–10. **Drive: 12 plays, 65 yards, 4:11.**

**Top passers**

- TEN – Cam Ward – 26/38, 222 yards, TD, INT
- LV – Geno Smith – 17/23, 174 yards, TD, INT

**Top rushers**

- TEN – Tony Pollard – 10 rushes, 34 yards
- LV – Ashton Jeanty – 23 rushes, 75 yards, TD

**Top receivers**

- TEN – Van Jefferson – 4 receptions, 75 yards
- LV – Tre Tucker – 5 receptions, 70 yards

Both offenses struggled, combining for just 2.39 yards per play in the first half, the lowest in an NFL game since Baltimore and Jacksonville averaged 1.80 yards per play on October 24, 2011. The Titans lost to the Raiders for the first time since 2017 to drop them to 1–5. In addition, it was their first road loss to the Raiders since the 2004 season.

Following the loss, the Titans fired head coach Brian Callahan the next day and appointed senior offensive assistant Mike McCoy as interim head coach. Callahan finished his tenure in Tennessee with a 4–19 record. Cam Ward continued to struggle by throwing 222 yards, 1 touchdown, 1 interception, and completed 68.4 percent of his passes to go with his 81.3 passer rating.

==== Week 7: vs. New England Patriots ====
Week 7: New England Patriots at Tennessee Titans – Game summary

Quarter	1	2	3	4	Total
**Patriots**	3	14	14	0	**31**
Titans	10	3	0	0	**13**

at Nissan Stadium, Nashville, Tennessee

- Date: October 19
- Game time: 12:00 p.m. CDT
- Game weather: Cloudy, 60 °F (16 °C)
- Game attendance: 67,410
- Referee: Craig Wrolstad
- TV announcers (CBS): Andrew Catalon, Charles Davis, Jason McCourty and AJ Ross
- Recap, Game Book

Game information

**First quarter**

- TEN – Joey Slye 49-yard field goal, 12:20. Titans 3–0. **Drive: 6 plays, 34 yards, 2:40.**
- NE – Andres Borregales 36-yard field goal, 6:46. Tied 3–3. **Drive: 10 plays, 47 yards, 5:34.**
- TEN – Chimere Dike 38-yard pass from Cam Ward (Joey Slye kick), 5:04. Titans 10–3. **Drive: 3 plays, 59 yards, 1:42.**

**Second quarter**

- NE – Austin Hooper 3-yard pass from Drake Maye (Andres Borregales kick), 5:34. Tied 10–10. **Drive: 11 plays, 93 yards, 6:42.**
- TEN – Joey Slye 50-yard field goal, 1:48. Titans 13–10. **Drive: 8 plays, 32 yards, 3:46.**
- NE – Kayshon Boutte 39-yard pass from Drake Maye (Andres Borregales kick), 0:49. Patriots 17–13. **Drive: 3 plays, 60 yards, 0:59.**

**Third quarter**

- NE – Rhamondre Stevenson 4-yard run (Andres Borregales kick), 7:31. Patriots 24–13. **Drive: 12 plays, 88 yards, 7:29.**
- NE – K'Lavon Chaisson 4-yard fumble recovery (Andres Borregales kick), 7:20. Patriots 31–13.

**Fourth quarter**

- No scoring plays

**Top passers**

- NE – Drake Maye – 21/23, 222 yards, 2 TD
- TEN – Cam Ward – 25/34, 255 yards, TD, INT

**Top rushers**

- NE – Rhamondre Stevenson – 18 rushes, 88 yards, TD
- TEN – Tyjae Spears – 5 rushes, 22 yards

**Top receivers**

- NE – Stefon Diggs – 7 receptions, 69 yards
- TEN – Chimere Dike – 4 receptions, 70 yards, TD

The Titans faced their former head coach, Mike Vrabel, who coached the team from 2018 to 2023. They also faced former linebacker Harold Landry, who played for the team for seven seasons. With their first loss at home to the Patriots since 2012, the Titans fell to 1–6 for the second straight year. Despite the loss, Cam Ward performed better than in the previous games by throwing 255 yards, 1 touchdown, 1 interception, and completed 73.5 percent of his passes to go with his 92.2 passer rating.

==== Week 8: at Indianapolis Colts ====
Week 8: Tennessee Titans at Indianapolis Colts – Game summary

Quarter	1	2	3	4	Total
Titans	0	7	0	7	**14**
**Colts**	10	7	14	7	**38**

at Lucas Oil Stadium, Indianapolis, Indiana

- Date: October 26
- Game time: 4:25 p.m. EDT/3:25 p.m. CDT
- Game weather: None (retractable roof closed)
- Game attendance: 65,816
- Referee: Land Clark
- TV announcers (CBS): Andrew Catalon, Charles Davis, Jason McCourty and AJ Ross
- Recap, Game Book

Game information

**First quarter**

- IND – Michael Badgley 43-yard field goal, 9:43. Colts 3–0. **Drive: 10 plays, 53 yards, 5:17.**
- IND – Jonathan Taylor 18-yard run (Michael Badgley kick), 0:09. Colts 10–0. **Drive: 8 plays, 73 yards, 4:54.**

**Second quarter**

- TEN – Gunnar Helm 1-yard pass from Cam Ward (Joey Slye kick), 11:14. Colts 10–7. **Drive: 6 plays, 69 yards, 3:55.**
- IND – Michael Pittman Jr. 21-yard pass from Daniel Jones (Michael Badgley kick), 7:44. Colts 17–7. **Drive: 6 plays, 71 yards, 3:30.**

**Third quarter**

- IND – Jonathan Taylor 80-yard run (Michael Badgley kick), 11:10. Colts 24–7. **Drive: 1 play, 80 yards, 0:12.**
- IND – Josh Downs 10-yard pass from Daniel Jones (Michael Badgley kick), 5:12. Colts 31–7. **Drive: 8 plays, 74 yards, 4:26.**

**Fourth quarter**

- IND – Jonathan Taylor 19-yard pass from Daniel Jones (Michael Badgley kick), 14:22. Colts 38–7. **Drive: 6 plays, 46 yards, 2:14.**
- TEN – Tyjae Spears 3-yard run (Joey Slye kick), 2:36. Colts 38–14. **Drive: 8 plays, 67 yards, 2:54.**

**Top passers**

- TEN – Cam Ward – 22/38, 259 yards, TD, INT
- IND – Daniel Jones – 21/29, 272 yards, 3 TD

**Top rushers**

- TEN – Tyjae Spears – 9 rushes, 59 yards, TD
- IND – Jonathan Taylor – 12 rushes, 153 yards, 2 TD

**Top receivers**

- TEN – Chimere Dike – 7 receptions, 93 yards
- IND – Michael Pittman Jr. – 8 receptions, 95 yards, TD

The Titans once again couldn't stop Colts running back Jonathan Taylor, as they allowed him to finish with 153 rushing yards on 12 carries and three touchdowns. Taylor became the first player in league history to score three touchdowns in three consecutive games against the same team. Cam Ward continued his ineptitude by throwing 259 yards, 1 touchdown, 1 interception, and completed just 57.9 percent of his passes to go with his 76.5 passer rating.

The Titans fell to 1–7, their worst start since 1994, extending their losing streak in Indianapolis to 3 games, their losing streak to their fellow AFC South teams on the road to 4 games, their losing streak to the Colts to 6 games, and their losing streak to their fellow AFC South teams to 7 games. This is now the Titans' third consecutive season getting swept by the Colts.

==== Week 9: vs. Los Angeles Chargers ====
Week 9: Los Angeles Chargers at Tennessee Titans – Game summary

Quarter	1	2	3	4	Total
**Chargers**	7	13	0	7	**27**
Titans	14	3	0	3	**20**

at Nissan Stadium, Nashville, Tennessee

- Date: November 2
- Game time: 12:00 p.m. CST
- Game weather: Cloudy, 46 °F (8 °C)
- Game attendance: 58,592
- Referee: Alex Kemp
- TV announcers (CBS): Tom McCarthy, Ross Tucker and Amanda Balionis
- Recap, Game Book

Game information

**First quarter**

- TEN – Cody Barton 24-yard interception return (Joey Slye kick), 11:19. Titans 7–0.
- LAC – Scott Matlock 2-yard pass from Justin Herbert (Cameron Dicker kick), 7:24. Tied 7–7. **Drive: 7 plays, 76 yards, 3:55.**
- TEN – Chimere Dike 67-yard punt return (Joey Slye kick), 2:55. Titans 14–7.

**Second quarter**

- LAC – Cameron Dicker 27-yard field goal, 14:06. Titans 14–10. **Drive: 9 plays, 56 yards, 3:49.**
- LAC – Quentin Johnston 19-yard pass from Justin Herbert (Cameron Dicker kick), 8:37. Chargers 17–14. **Drive: 6 plays, 70 yards, 3:27.**
- TEN – Joey Slye 49-yard field goal, 5:02. Tied 17–17. **Drive: 5 plays, 29 yards, 3:35.**
- LAC – Cameron Dicker 20-yard field goal, 0:20. Chargers 20–17. **Drive: 6 plays, 40 yards, 2:03.**

**Third quarter**

- No scoring plays

**Fourth quarter**

- LAC – Justin Herbert 1-yard run (Cameron Dicker kick), 12:58. Chargers 27–17. **Drive: 15 plays, 99 yards, 9:03.**
- TEN – Joey Slye 37-yard field goal, 4:19. Chargers 27–20. **Drive: 8 plays, 40 yards, 4:13.**

**Top passers**

- LAC – Justin Herbert – 19/29, 250 yards, 2 TD, INT
- TEN – Cam Ward – 12/21, 145 yards

**Top rushers**

- LAC – Justin Herbert – 9 rushes, 57 yards
- TEN – Tony Pollard – 10 rushes, 56 yards

**Top receivers**

- LAC – Oronde Gadsden II – 5 receptions, 68 yards
- TEN – Elic Ayomanor – 3 receptions, 46 yards

Despite the Titans sacking Chargers quarterback Justin Herbert six times and scoring on both a pick-six and a punt return, they still fell short against the Chargers. This marked the Titans' first home loss to the Chargers since the 2009 season when the latter franchise was still based in San Diego. This loss dropped Tennessee to their first 1–8 start since 1994. Cam Ward ended his six-game streak with an interception. The Titans extended their losing streak at home to 8 games, going back to last season, which is the longest active losing streak in the NFL. While Cam Ward's interception streak officially ended, his overall ineptitude did not, and he threw just 145 yards and completed just 57.1 percent of his passes to go with his 78.5 passer rating.

==== Week 11: vs. Houston Texans ====
Week 11: Houston Texans at Tennessee Titans – Game summary

Quarter	1	2	3	4	Total
**Texans**	0	0	10	6	**16**
Titans	3	0	3	7	**13**

at Nissan Stadium, Nashville, Tennessee

- Date: November 16
- Game time: 12:00 p.m. CST
- Game weather: Sunny, 64 °F (18 °C)
- Game attendance: 55,999
- Referee: Shawn Hochuli
- TV announcers (Fox): Chris Myers, Mark Schlereth and Jen Hale
- Recap, Game Book

Game information

**First quarter**

- TEN – Joey Slye 56-yard field goal, 0:50. Titans 3–0. **Drive: 13 plays, 50 yards, 7:30.**

**Second quarter**

- No scoring plays

**Third quarter**

- TEN – Joey Slye 47-yard field goal, 10:45. Titans 6–0. **Drive: 8 plays, 37 yards, 4:15.**
- HOU – Nico Collins 3-yard pass from Davis Mills (Matthew Wright kick), 7:21. Texans 7–6. **Drive: 7 plays, 65 yards, 3:24.**
- HOU – Matthew Wright 41-yard field goal, 1:32. Texans 10–6. **Drive: 10 plays, 63 yards, 4:22.**

**Fourth quarter**

- HOU – Matthew Wright 43-yard field goal, 11:59. Texans 13–6. **Drive: 4 plays, 9 yards, 1:31.**
- TEN – Van Jefferson 4-yard pass from Cam Ward (Joey Slye kick), 1:35. Tied 13–13. **Drive: 11 plays, 95 yards, 3:22.**
- HOU – Matthew Wright 35-yard field goal, 0:00. Texans 16–13. **Drive: 9 plays, 48 yards, 1:35.**

**Top passers**

- HOU – Davis Mills – 26/41, 274 yards, TD
- TEN – Cam Ward – 24/37, 194 yards, TD

**Top rushers**

- HOU – Woody Marks – 18 rushes, 44 yards
- TEN – Cam Ward – 3 rushes, 33 yards

**Top receivers**

- HOU – Nico Collins – 9 receptions, 92 yards, TD
- TEN – Chig Okonkwo – 3 receptions, 56 yards

The defeat eliminated Tennessee from AFC South title contention, ensuring a fourth consecutive season without a division championship and guaranteeing a losing record for the fourth consecutive season. Quarterback Cam Ward struggled, finishing with 194 passing yards and one touchdown, completing 64.9 percent of his attempts for a passer rating of 87.0. With their 8th straight divisional loss (3rd against Houston), the Titans fell to 1–9 for the first time since 1994.

The following day, it was announced that wide receiver Calvin Ridley would miss the remainder of the season after suffering a broken right leg.

==== Week 12: vs. Seattle Seahawks ====
Week 12: Seattle Seahawks at Tennessee Titans – Game summary

Quarter	1	2	3	4	Total
**Seahawks**	3	13	14	0	**30**
Titans	3	0	14	7	**24**

at Nissan Stadium, Nashville, Tennessee

- Date: November 23
- Game time: 12:00 p.m. CST
- Game weather: Sunny, 55 °F (13 °C)
- Game attendance: 60,487
- Referee: Ron Torbert
- TV announcers (Fox): Kevin Kugler, Daryl Johnston and Allison Williams
- Recap, Game Book

Game information

**First quarter**

- TEN – Joey Slye 22-yard field goal, 5:51. Titans 3–0. **Drive: 15 plays, 63 yards, 9:09.**
- SEA – Jason Myers 47-yard field goal, 2:14. Tied 3–3. **Drive: 8 plays, 45 yards, 3:37.**

**Second quarter**

- SEA – Jaxon Smith-Njigba 63-yard pass from Sam Darnold (Jason Myers kick), 11:02. Seahawks 10–3. **Drive: 3 plays, 67 yards, 1:42.**
- SEA – Jason Myers 30-yard field goal, 4:44. Seahawks 13–3. **Drive: 8 plays, 15 yards, 4:04.**
- SEA – Jason Myers 36-yard field goal, 0:00. Seahawks 16–3. **Drive: 9 plays, 43 yards, 1:48.**

**Third quarter**

- SEA – Jaxon Smith-Njigba 13-yard pass from Sam Darnold (Jason Myers kick), 13:19. Seahawks 23–3. **Drive: 3 plays, 76 yards, 1:41.**
- TEN – Chimere Dike 90-yard punt return (Joey Slye kick), 10:22. Seahawks 23–10.
- SEA – Zach Charbonnet 5-yard run (Jason Myers kick), 6:40. Seahawks 30–10. **Drive: 6 plays, 74 yards, 3:42.**
- TEN – Cam Ward 6-yard run (Joey Slye kick), 1:18. Seahawks 30–17. **Drive: 9 plays, 73 yards, 5:22.**

**Fourth quarter**

- TEN – Chimere Dike 1-yard pass from Cam Ward (Joey Slye kick), 0:43. Seahawks 30–24. **Drive: 15 plays, 62 yards, 4:25.**

**Top passers**

- SEA – Sam Darnold – 16/26, 244 yards, 2 TD
- TEN – Cam Ward – 28/42, 256 yards, TD

**Top rushers**

- SEA – Kenneth Walker III – 11 rushes, 71 yards
- TEN – Cam Ward – 6 rushes, 37 yards, TD

**Top receivers**

- SEA – Jaxon Smith-Njigba – 8 receptions, 167 yards, 2 TD
- TEN – Gunnar Helm – 6 receptions, 51 yards

The Titans extended their home losing streak to ten games. Cam Ward completed 66.7 percent of his passes for 256 yards and one touchdown with no interceptions, finishing with a 91 passer rating. He also added 37 rushing yards and a rushing touchdown.

==== Week 13: vs. Jacksonville Jaguars ====
Week 13: Jacksonville Jaguars at Tennessee Titans – Game summary

Quarter	1	2	3	4	Total
**Jaguars**	7	11	7	0	**25**
Titans	3	0	0	0	**3**

at Nissan Stadium, Nashville, Tennessee

- Date: November 30
- Game time: 12:00 p.m. CST
- Game weather: Cloudy, 38 °F (3 °C)
- Game attendance: 54,098
- Referee: Brad Rogers
- TV announcers (CBS): Spero Dedes, Adam Archuleta and Aditi Kinkhabwala
- Recap, Game Book

Game information

**First quarter**

- TEN – Joey Slye 28-yard field goal, 5:06. Titans 3–0. **Drive: 11 plays, 70 yards, 5:58.**
- JAX – Jakobi Meyers 3-yard pass from Trevor Lawrence (Cam Little kick), 1:04. Jaguars 7–3. **Drive: 7 plays, 84 yards, 4:02.**

**Second quarter**

- JAX – Brenton Strange 21-yard pass from Trevor Lawrence (Trevor Lawrence run), 14:54. Jaguars 15–3. **Drive: 3 plays, 35 yards, 1:04.**
- JAX – Cam Little 45-yard field goal, 0:00. Jaguars 18–3. **Drive: 4 plays, 52 yards, 0:20.**

**Third quarter**

- JAX – Bhayshul Tuten 2-yard run (Cam Little kick), 6:45. Jaguars 25–3. **Drive: 15 plays, 71 yards, 6:36.**

**Fourth quarter**

- No scoring plays.

**Top passers**

- JAX – Trevor Lawrence – 16/27, 229 yards, 2 TD
- TEN – Cam Ward – 24/38, 141 yards

**Top rushers**

- JAX – Travis Etienne – 12 rushes, 28 yards
- TEN – Tony Pollard – 10 rushes, 60 yards

**Top receivers**

- JAX – Jakobi Meyers – 6 receptions, 90 yards, TD
- TEN – Chig Okonkwo – 4 receptions, 29 yards

With the loss, the Titans fell to 1–11 for the first time since 1994, and extended their losing streak to the Jaguars at home to two games, their losing streak to the Jaguars regardless of location to three games, their losing streak to their fellow AFC South teams at home to six games, and their losing streak against them regardless of location to nine games. The loss also meant the Titans failed to qualify for playoff contention for the 4th straight year. It was the third time in 4 years the Titans were eliminated via a loss to Jacksonville. Cam Ward had a very poor game by throwing just 141 yards, no touchdowns, no interceptions, and completed just 63.2 percent of his passes to go with his 70.2 passer rating.

During the game, a skirmish broke out when Titans safety Mike Brown threw a punch at Jaguars long snapper Ross Matiscik after Matiscik delivered a shot to Tennessee running back Julius Chestnut. Brown was ejected from the game, while Matiscik received a personal foul for unnecessary roughness but was not ejected.

==== Week 14: at Cleveland Browns ====
Week 14: Tennessee Titans at Cleveland Browns – Game summary

Quarter	1	2	3	4	Total
**Titans**	14	0	7	10	**31**
Browns	3	14	0	12	**29**

at Huntington Bank Field, Cleveland, Ohio

- Date: December 7
- Game time: 1:00 p.m. EST/12:00 p.m. CST
- Game weather: Cloudy, 33 °F (1 °C)
- Game attendance: 62,982
- Referee: Carl Cheffers
- TV announcers (Fox): Chris Myers, Mark Schlereth and Jen Hale
- Recap, Game Book

Game information

**First quarter**

- TEN – Elic Ayomanor 5-yard pass from Cam Ward (Joey Slye kick), 9:52. Titans 7–0. **Drive: 8 plays, 53 yards, 5:08.**
- CLE – Andre Szmyt 38-yard field goal, 1:42. Titans 7–3. **Drive: 5 plays, 19 yards, 2:03.**
- TEN – Tony Pollard 65-yard run (Joey Slye kick), 1:29. 'Titans 14–3. **Drive: 1 play, 65 yards, 0:13.**

**Second quarter**

- CLE – David Njoku 1-yard pass from Shedeur Sanders (Andre Szmyt kick), 14:24. Titans 14–10. **Drive: 4 plays, 60 yards, 2:05.**
- CLE – Jerry Jeudy 60-yard pass from Shedeur Sanders (Andre Szmyt kick), 2:47. Browns 17–14. **Drive: 3 plays, 74 yards, 0:55.**

**Third quarter**

- TEN – Tony Pollard 32-yard run (Joey Slye kick), 0:51. Titans 21–17. **Drive: 2 plays, 38 yards, 0:50.**

**Fourth quarter**

- TEN – Chimere Dike 5-yard pass from Cam Ward (Joey Slye kick), 9:29. Titans 28–17. **Drive: 3 plays, 8 yards, 1:25.**
- TEN – Joey Slye 41-yard field goal, 6:17. Titans 31–17. **Drive: 4 plays, 6 yards, 2:07.**
- CLE – Shedeur Sanders 7-yard run (run failed), 4:27. Titans 31–23. **Drive: 5 plays, 66 yards, 1:50.**
- CLE – Harold Fannin Jr. 7-yard pass from Shedeur Sanders (pass failed), 1:03. Titans 31–29. **Drive: 7 plays, 80 yards, 1:40.**

**Top passers**

- TEN – Cam Ward – 14/28, 117 yards, 2 TD, INT
- CLE – Shedeur Sanders – 23/42, 364 yards, 3 TD, INT

**Top rushers**

- TEN – Tony Pollard – 25 rushes, 161 yards, 2 TD
- CLE – Shedeur Sanders – 3 rushes, 29 yards, TD

**Top receivers**

- TEN – Tyjae Spears – 2 receptions, 28 yards
- CLE – Harold Fannin Jr. – 8 receptions, 114 yards, TD

The Titans scored a touchdown on their opening drive for the first time this season when Ward connected with Elic Ayomanor on a crossing route for a 14-yard score. They also blocked a punt for the first time since the 2012 season. With the win, the Titans snapped their 7-game losing streak and improved to 2–11. This was also their first win against an AFC opponent since Week 12 of 2024.

==== Week 15: at San Francisco 49ers ====
Week 15: Tennessee Titans at San Francisco 49ers – Game summary

Quarter	1	2	3	4	Total
Titans	3	7	0	14	**24**
**49ers**	7	10	14	6	**37**

at Levi's Stadium, Santa Clara, California

- Date: December 14
- Game time: 3:25 p.m. CST/1:25 p.m. PST
- Game weather: Cloudy, 54 °F (12 °C)
- Game attendance: 71,042
- Referee: Craig Wrolstad
- TV announcers (Fox): Adam Amin, Drew Brees and Kristina Pink
- Recap, Game Book

Game information

**First quarter**

- SF – Jauan Jennings 4-yard pass from Brock Purdy (Eddy Pineiro kick), 7:48. 49ers 7–0. **Drive: 12 plays, 70 yards, 6:03.**
- TEN – Joey Slye 25-yard field goal, 1:22. 49ers 7–3. **Drive: 10 plays, 63 yards, 6:26.**

**Second quarter**

- SF – Christian McCaffrey 1-yard run (Eddy Pineiro kick), 13:03. 49ers 14–3. **Drive: 7 plays, 70 yards, 3:19.**
- TEN – Gunnar Helm 34-yard pass from Cam Ward (Joey Slye kick), 7:43. 49ers 14–10. **Drive: 8 plays, 68 yards, 5:20.**
- SF – Eddy Pineiro 33-yard field goal, 0:56. 49ers 17–10. **Drive: 14 plays, 50 yards, 6:47.**

**Third quarter**

- SF – Jauan Jennings 13-yard pass from Brock Purdy (Eddy Pineiro kick), 12:54. 49ers 24–10. **Drive: 4 plays, 67 yards, 2:06.**
- SF – George Kittle 1-yard pass from Brock Purdy (Eddy Pineiro kick), 2:10. 49ers 31–10. **Drive: 15 plays, 95 yards, 9:14.**

**Fourth quarter**

- TEN – Jeffery Simmons 1-yard pass from Cam Ward (Joey Slye kick), 14:16. 49ers 31–17. **Drive: 2 plays, 44 yards, 0:30.**
- SF – Eddy Pineiro 37-yard field goal, 9:28. 49ers 34–17. **Drive: 8 plays, 41 yards, 4:48.**
- TEN – Tony Pollard 6-yard run (Joey Slye kick), 5:33. 49ers 34–24. **Drive: 10 plays, 64 yards, 3:55.**
- SF – Eddy Pineiro 40-yard field goal, 1:10. 49ers 37–24. **Drive: 10 plays, 43 yards, 4:23.**

**Top passers**

- TEN – Cam Ward – 18/29, 170 yards, 2 TD
- SF – Brock Purdy – 23/30, 295 yards, 3 TD

**Top rushers**

- TEN – Tony Pollard – 14 rushes, 104 yards, TD
- SF – Christian McCaffrey – 22 rushes, 73 yards, TD

**Top receivers**

- TEN – Gunnar Helm – 4 receptions, 49 yards, TD
- SF – Ricky Pearsall – 6 receptions, 96 yards

With the loss, Tennessee fell to 2–12 and finished 1–3 against the NFC West.

==== Week 16: vs. Kansas City Chiefs ====
Week 16: Kansas City Chiefs at Tennessee Titans – Game summary

Quarter	1	2	3	4	Total
Chiefs	0	6	3	0	**9**
**Titans**	0	9	7	10	**26**

at Nissan Stadium, Nashville, Tennessee

- Date: December 21
- Game time: 12:00 p.m. CST
- Game weather: Sunny, 51 °F (11 °C)
- Game attendance: 61,752
- Referee: Clete Blakeman
- TV announcers (CBS): Kevin Harlan, Trent Green and Melanie Collins
- Recap, Game Book

Game information

**First quarter**

- No scoring plays

**Second quarter**

- TEN – Kareem Hunt loss of 2 yards for a safety, 13:06. Titans 2–0.
- KC – Harrison Butker 54-yard field goal, 7:40. Chiefs 3–2. **Drive: 9 plays, 28 yards, 3:59.**
- TEN – Chig Okonkwo 7-yard pass from Cam Ward (Joey Slye kick), 1:37. Titans 9–3. **Drive: 11 plays, 89 yards, 6:03.**
- KC – Harrison Butker 41-yard field goal, 0:06. Titans 9–6. **Drive: 7 plays, 45 yards, 1:31.**

**Third quarter**

- TEN – Chimere Dike 1-yard pass from Cam Ward (Joey Slye kick), 10:32. Titans 16–6. **Drive: 9 plays, 75 yards, 4:28.**
- KC – Harrison Butker 27-yard field goal, 3:00. Titans 16–9. **Drive: 6 plays, 41 yards, 3:22.**

**Fourth quarter**

- TEN – Tyjae Spears 4-yard run (Joey Slye kick), 11:56. Titans 23–9. **Drive: 10 plays, 64 yards, 6:04.**
- TEN – Joey Slye 27-yard field goal, 3:44. Titans 26–9. **Drive: 13 plays, 57 yards, 6:17.**

**Top passers**

- KC – Chris Oladokun – 11/16, 111 yards
- TEN – Cam Ward – 21/28, 228 yards, 2 TD

**Top rushers**

- KC – Isiah Pacheco – 8 rushes, 34 yards
- TEN – Tony Pollard – 21 rushes, 102 yards

**Top receivers**

- KC – Isiah Pacheco – 6 receptions, 41 yards
- TEN – Elic Ayomanor – 3 receptions, 58 yards

With the upset win, Tennessee secured their first home win since Week 9 of 2024, snapping an 11-game losing streak, and improved to 3–12 and finishing 1–3 against the AFC West.

==== Week 17: vs. New Orleans Saints ====
Week 17: New Orleans Saints at Tennessee Titans – Game summary

Quarter	1	2	3	4	Total
**Saints**	0	10	10	14	**34**
Titans	6	14	3	3	**26**

at Nissan Stadium, Nashville, Tennessee

- Date: December 28
- Game time: 12:00 p.m. CST
- Game weather: Cloudy, 71 °F (22 °C)
- Game attendance: 56,269
- Referee: Adrian Hill
- TV announcers (CBS): Andrew Catalon, Charles Davis, Jason McCourty and AJ Ross
- Recap, Game Book

Game information

**First quarter**

- TEN – Joey Slye 50-yard field goal, 9:10. Titans 3–0. **Drive: 4 plays, 3 yards, 1:34.**
- TEN – Joey Slye 38-yard field goal, 4:31. Titans 6–0. **Drive: 7 plays, 47 yards, 3:05.**

**Second quarter**

- TEN – Chig Okonkwo 43-yard pass from Cam Ward (Joey Slye kick), 12:57. Titans 13–0. **Drive: 7 plays, 64 yards, 4:09.**
- NO – Charlie Smyth 56-yard field goal, 5:53. Titans 13–3. **Drive: 12 plays, 44 yards, 7:04.**
- NO – Chase Young 33-yard fumble recovery (Charlie Smyth kick), 3:51. Titans 13–10.
- TEN – Elic Ayomanor 7-yard pass from Cam Ward (Joey Slye kick), 0:13. Titans 20–10. **Drive: 9 plays, 80 yards, 3:38.**

**Third quarter**

- NO – Chris Olave 19-yard pass from Tyler Shough (Charlie Smyth kick), 10:34. Titans 20–17. **Drive: 9 plays, 74 yards, 4:26.**
- TEN – Joey Slye 28-yard field goal, 7:28. Titans 23–17. **Drive: 6 plays, 55 yards, 3:14.**
- NO – Charlie Smyth 57-yard field goal, 1:51. Titans 23–20. **Drive: 8 plays, 27 yards, 5:29.**

**Fourth quarter**

- TEN – Joey Slye 58-yard field goal, 12:50. Titans 26–20. **Drive: 10 plays, 25 yards, 4:01.**
- NO – Kevin Austin Jr. 10-yard pass from Tyler Shough (Charlie Smyth kick), 6:22. Saints 27–26. **Drive: 10 plays, 25 yards, 4:01.**
- NO – Audric Estimé 32-yard run (Charlie Smyth kick), 3:44. Saints 34–26. **Drive: 4 plays, 64 yards, 1:10.**

**Top passers**

- NO – Tyler Shough – 22/27, 333 yards, 2 TD
- TEN – Cam Ward – 21/40, 251 yards, 2 TD

**Top rushers**

- NO – Audric Estimé – 14 rushes, 94 yards, TD
- TEN – Tony Pollard – 18 rushes, 85 yards

**Top receivers**

- NO – Chris Olave – 8 receptions, 119 yards, TD
- TEN – Chig Okonkwo – 3 receptions, 55 yards, TD

With the loss, the Titans fell to 3–13, finishing 1–4 against the NFC and 1–8 at home.

Return specialist Chimere Dike surpassed Tim Brown’s 2,317 all-purpose yards in 1988, setting the NFL record for the most all-purpose yards in a single season by a rookie.

==== Week 18: at Jacksonville Jaguars ====
Week 18: Tennessee Titans at Jacksonville Jaguars – Game summary

Quarter	1	2	3	4	Total
Titans	7	0	0	0	**7**
**Jaguars**	7	24	3	7	**41**

at EverBank Stadium, Jacksonville, Florida

- Date: January 4
- Game time: 1:00 p.m. EST/12:00 p.m. CST
- Game weather: Cloudy, 58 °F (14 °C)
- Game attendance: 66,015
- Referee: Scott Novak
- TV announcers (Fox): Adam Amin, Drew Brees and Kristina Pink
- Recap, Game Book

Game information

**First quarter**

- TEN – Cam Ward 7-yard run (Joey Slye kick), 10:09. Titans 7–0. **Drive: 5 plays, 58 yards, 3:22.**
- JAX – Parker Washington 23-yard pass from Trevor Lawrence (Cam Little kick), 6:02. Tied 7–7. **Drive: 7 plays, 67 yards, 4:07.**

**Second quarter**

- JAX – Brenton Strange 7-yard pass from Trevor Lawrence (Cam Little kick), 11:47. Jaguars 14–7. **Drive: 5 plays, 82 yards, 3:05.**
- JAX – Antonio Johnson 58-yard interception return (Cam Little kick), 8:07. Jaguars 21–7.
- JAX – Quintin Morris 5-yard pass from Trevor Lawrence (Cam Little kick), 1:56. Jaguars 28–7. **Drive: 9 plays, 86 yards, 5:06.**
- JAX – Cam Little 67-yard field goal, 0:00. Jaguars 31–7. **Drive: 1 play, 0 yards, 0:03.**

**Third quarter**

- JAX – Cam Little 52-yard field goal, 1:03. Jaguars 34–7. **Drive: 10 plays, 41 yards, 5:51.**

**Fourth quarter**

- JAX – Bhayshul Tuten 5-yard run (Cam Little kick), 7:28. Jaguars 41–7. **Drive: 10 plays, 51 yards, 5:55.**

**Top passers**

- TEN – Brandon Allen – 17/30, 72 yards, INT
- JAX – Trevor Lawrence – 22/30, 255 yards, 3 TD

**Top rushers**

- TEN – Tony Pollard – 14 rushes, 48 yards
- JAX – Travis Etienne – 14 rushes, 32 yards

**Top receivers**

- TEN – Elic Ayomanor – 3 receptions, 50 yards
- JAX – Parker Washington – 5 receptions, 87 yards, TD

With the loss, the Titans were swept by the AFC South for the first time and by their division for the first time since the 1976 AFC Central, when the franchise was known as the Houston Oilers. The Titans also secured back-to-back 3–14 seasons and finished 2–6 on the road.

=== Standings ===
==== Division ====
AFC South
	W	L	T	PCT	DIV	CONF	PF	PA	STK
^{(3)} Jacksonville Jaguars	13	4	0	.765	5–1	10–2	474	336	W8
^{(5)} Houston Texans	12	5	0	.706	5–1	10–2	404	295	W9
Indianapolis Colts	8	9	0	.471	2–4	6–6	466	412	L7
Tennessee Titans	3	14	0	.176	0–6	2–10	284	478	L2

==== Conference ====
AFC
Seed	Team	Division	W	L	T	PCT	DIV	CONF	SOS	SOV	STK
**Division leaders**
1 (Note: Denver finished ahead of New England based on common games (Denver 6–0 to New England 5–1 against: Cincinnati, Las Vegas, NY Giants, NY Jets and Tennessee).)	Denver Broncos	West	14	3	0	.824	5–1	9–3	.422	.378	W2
2	New England Patriots	East	14	3	0	.824	5–1	9–3	.391	.370	W3
3	Jacksonville Jaguars	South	13	4	0	.765	5–1	10–2	.478	.425	W8
4	Pittsburgh Steelers	North	10	7	0	.588	4–2	8–4	.503	.453	W1
**Wild cards**
5 (Note: Houston finished ahead of Buffalo based on head-to-head victory.)	Houston Texans	South	12	5	0	.706	5–1	10–2	.522	.441	W9
6	Buffalo Bills	East	12	5	0	.706	4–2	9–3	.471	.412	W1
7	Los Angeles Chargers	West	11	6	0	.647	5–1	8–4	.469	.425	L2
**Did not qualify for the postseason**
8 (Note: Indianapolis finished ahead of Baltimore based on conference record (Indianapolis 6–6 to Baltimore 5–7).)	Indianapolis Colts	South	8	9	0	.471	2–4	6–6	.540	.382	L7
9	Baltimore Ravens	North	8	9	0	.471	3–3	5–7	.507	.408	L1
10	Miami Dolphins	East	7	10	0	.412	3–3	3–9	.488	.378	L1
11 (Note: Cincinnati finished ahead of Kansas City based on conference record (Cincinnati 5–7 to Kansas City 3–9).)	Cincinnati Bengals	North	6	11	0	.353	3–3	5–7	.521	.451	L1
12	Kansas City Chiefs	West	6	11	0	.353	1–5	3–9	.514	.363	L6
13	Cleveland Browns	North	5	12	0	.294	2–4	4–8	.486	.418	W2
14 (Note: Las Vegas finished ahead of NY Jets and Tennessee based on conference record (Las Vegas 3–9 to NY Jets 2–10 and Tennessee 2–10).)	Las Vegas Raiders	West	3	14	0	.176	1–5	3–9	.538	.451	W1
15 (Note: NY Jets finished ahead of Tennessee based on strength of victory (NY Jets .373 to Tennessee .275).)	New York Jets	East	3	14	0	.176	0–6	2–10	.552	.373	L5
16	Tennessee Titans	South	3	14	0	.176	0–6	2–10	.574	.275	L2
**Tiebreakers** (Note: When breaking ties for three or more teams under the NFL's rules, they are first broken within divisions, then comparing only the highest ranked remaining team from each division.)
