= Gunnar Helm =

American football player (born 2002)

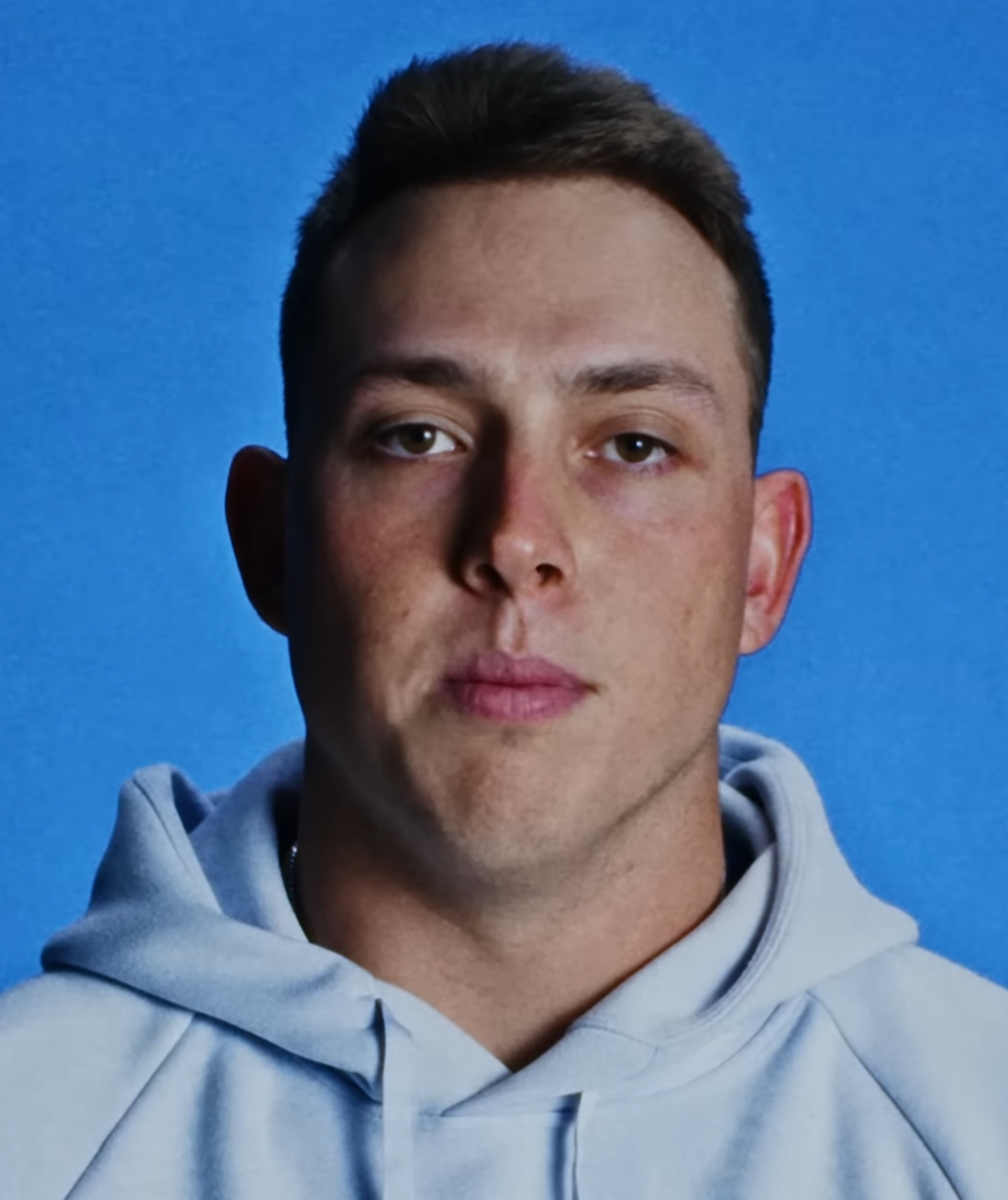
- Helm in 2025

No. 84 – Tennessee Titans
- Position: Tight end
- Roster status: Active

Personal information
- Born: September 6, 2002 (age 24); Greenwood Village, Colorado, U.S.
- Listed height: 6 ft 5 in (1.96 m)
- Listed weight: 241 lb (109 kg)

Career information
- High school: Cherry Creek (Greenwood Village)
- College: Texas (2021–2024)
- NFL draft: 2025: 4th round, 120th overall pick

Career history
- Tennessee Titans (2025–present)

Awards and highlights
- Second-team All-SEC (2024)

Career NFL statistics as of Week 4, 2026
- Receptions: 53
- Receiving yards: 417
- Receiving touchdowns: 2
- Stats at Pro Football Reference

Gunnar Blake Helm (born September 6, 2002) is an American professional football tight end for the Tennessee Titans of the National Football League (NFL). He played college football for the Texas Longhorns and was selected by the Titans in the fourth round of the 2025 NFL draft.

== Early life ==
Helm attended Cherry Creek High School in Greenwood Village, Colorado. During Helm's junior season, he hauled in 33 receptions for 411 yards and seven touchdowns. As a senior, he had 28 receptions for 367 yards and seven touchdowns. Coming out of high school, Helm was rated as a three-star recruit, where he held offers from schools such as Alabama, Auburn, Colorado State, and Texas. He committed to the University of Texas at Austin to play college football.

== College career ==
Helm played in 12 games as a true freshman at Texas in 2021 and did not record a catch. In 2022, he started four of 13 games and had five receptions for 44 yards. In week three of the 2023 season, Helm hauled in one reception for 14 yards that set up a touchdown for the Longhorns, in a win over Wyoming. He played in 14 games with six starts in 2023, recording 14 receptions for 192 yards and two touchdowns. Helm returned to Texas for his senior year in 2024. In week two of the 2024 season, Helm had a breakout game, totaling seven receptions for 98 yards and a touchdown in a win over the Michigan Wolverines.

== Professional career ==
Pre-draft measurables
Height	Weight	Arm length	Hand span	Wingspan	40-yard dash	10-yard split	20-yard split	20-yard shuttle	Three-cone drill	Vertical jump
6 ft 5 in (1.96 m)	241 lb (109 kg)	32 3/4 in (0.83 m)	9 7/8 in (0.25 m)	6 ft 7 1/2 in (2.02 m)	4.84 s	1.69 s	2.84 s	4.40 s	7.15 s	30.0 in (0.76 m)
All values from NFL Combine

=== 2025 season ===
Helm was selected by the Tennessee Titans in the fourth round (120th overall) of the 2025 NFL draft. The Titans previously acquired this draft pick, alongside linebacker Jerome Baker, by trading away linebacker Ernest Jones to the Seattle Seahawks. On May 10, 2025, Helm signed his four-year rookie contract worth $5.17 million.

Helm began the preseason behind returning starting tight end Chig Okonkwo. Helm made his NFL debut in Week 1 against the Denver Broncos, listed as a starter alongside Okonkwo, recording one catch for 16 yards in the 12-20 loss. In a 14-38 Week 8 loss against the Indianapolis Colts, Helm caught 2 receptions for 23 yards and his first NFL career touchdown. He caught another receiving touchdown in a 24-37 loss against the San Francisco 49ers in Week 15. Helm finished the 2025 season with the franchise rookie record for receptions by a tight end with 44 catches, alongside hauling in 357 receiving yards and two receiving touchdowns.

=== 2026 season ===
During the 2026 offseason, Okonkwo signed with the Washington Commanders, opening up the prime starting tight end position on the Titans. Helm entered into training camp with veteran Daniel Bellinger projected as his only real competition.

== Career statistics ==
=== NFL ===
Legend
**Bold**	Career high

Year	Team	Games		Receiving						Fumbles	
Year	Team	GP	GS	Tgt	Rec	Yds	Avg	Lng	TD	Fum	Lost
2025	TEN	16	10	55	44	357	8.1	34	2	0	0
Career		16	10	55	44	357	8.1	34	2	0	0

=== College ===
Season	Team	Games		Receiving			
Season	Team	GP	GS	Rec	Yds	Avg	TD
2021	Texas	12	0	0	0	0.0	0
2022	Texas	13	4	5	44	8.8	0
2023	Texas	14	6	14	192	**13.7**	2
2024	Texas	**16**	**16**	**60**	**786**	13.1	**7**
Career		55	26	79	1,022	12.9	9
