= Chig Okonkwo =

American football player (born 1999)

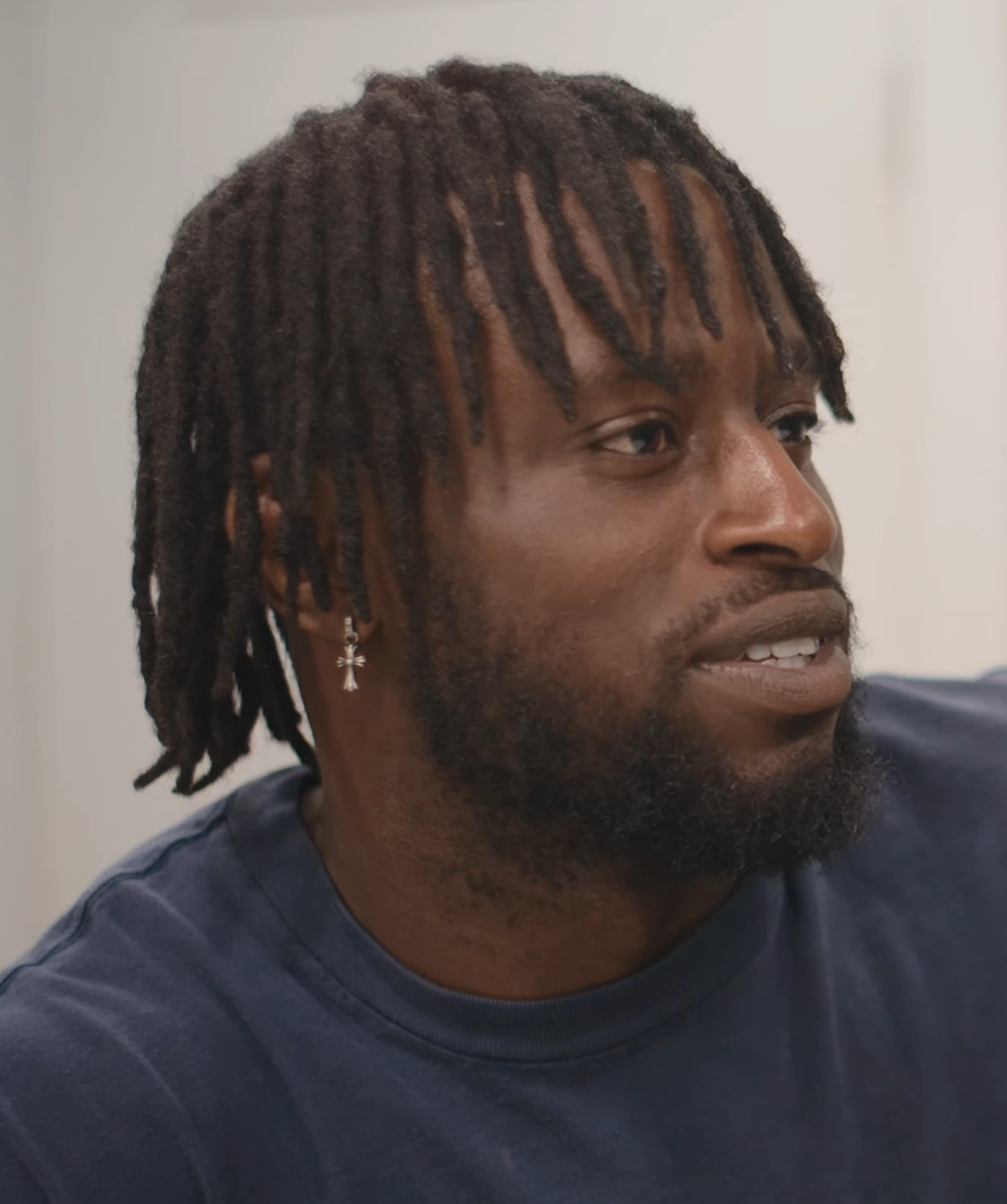
- Okonkwo in 2023

No. 85 – Washington Commanders
- Position: Tight end
- Roster status: Active

Personal information
- Born: September 8, 1999 (age 27); Powder Springs, Georgia, U.S.
- Listed height: 6 ft 3 in (1.91 m)
- Listed weight: 238 lb (108 kg)

Career information
- High school: Hillgrove (Powder Springs)
- College: Maryland (2018–2021)
- NFL draft: 2022: 4th round, 143rd overall pick

Career history
- Tennessee Titans (2022–2025); Washington Commanders (2026−present)

Awards and highlights
- PFWA All-Rookie Team (2022)

Career NFL statistics as of Week 8, 2026
- Receptions: 211
- Receiving yards: 2,199
- Rushing yards: 25
- Receiving touchdowns: 8
- Stats at Pro Football Reference

Chigoziem Charlton Okonkwo (born September 8, 1999) is an American professional football tight end for the Washington Commanders of the National Football League (NFL). He played college football for the Maryland Terrapins and was selected by the Tennessee Titans in the fourth round of the 2022 NFL draft.

== Early life ==
Okonkwo grew up in Powder Springs, Georgia, and attended Hillgrove High School. He was born to a Nigerian family. As a junior, he caught 48 passes for 907 yards and 12 touchdowns. Okonkwo was rated a three-star recruit and committed to play college football at Maryland over offers from Georgia Tech and Wisconsin.

== College career ==
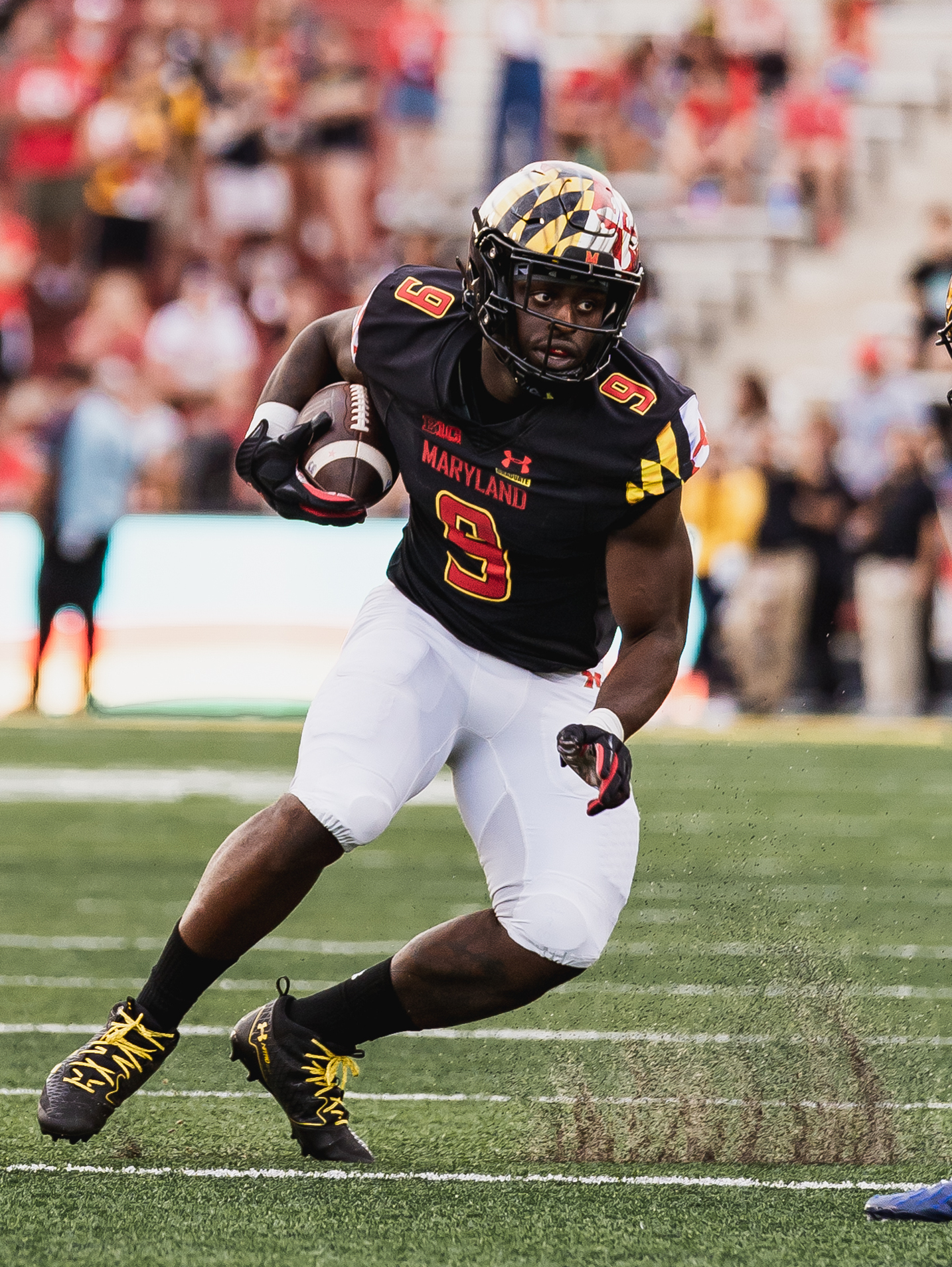
Okonkwo with the Maryland Terrapins in 2021

Okonkwo caught six passes for 69 yards and a touchdown and also rushed three times for 72 yards and a touchdown during his freshman season. As a sophomore, he had 19 receptions for 201 yards and two touchdowns. Okonkwo missed the 2020 season after he developed myocarditis. As a senior, Okonkwo caught 52 passes for 447 yards and five touchdowns.

== Professional career ==
Pre-draft measurables
Height	Weight	Arm length	Hand span	Wingspan	40-yard dash	10-yard split	20-yard split	20-yard shuttle	Three-cone drill	Vertical jump	Broad jump	Bench press
6 ft 2 1/2 in (1.89 m)	238 lb (108 kg)	32 3/4 in (0.83 m)	9 3/4 in (0.25 m)	6 ft 6 1/8 in (1.98 m)	4.52 s	1.57 s	2.65 s	4.45 s	7.19 s	35.5 in (0.90 m)	9 ft 9 in (2.97 m)	13 reps
All values from NFL Combine/Pro Day

=== Tennessee Titans ===
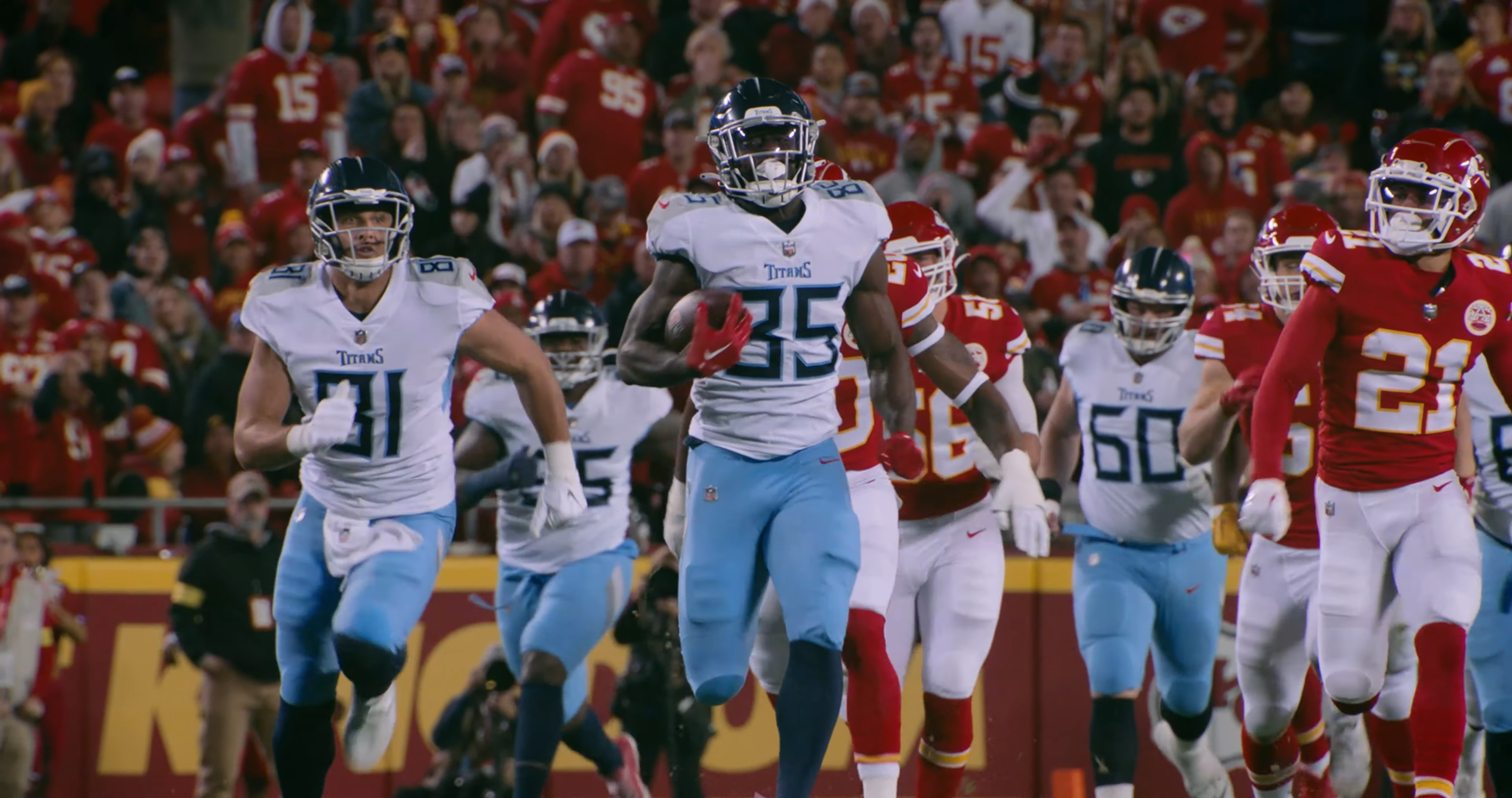
Okonkwo (#85) with the Tennessee Titans in 2022

==== 2022 season ====
Okonkwo was selected in the fourth round of the 2022 NFL draft with the 143rd overall pick by the Tennessee Titans. He made his NFL debut in Week 1 against the New York Giants. In Week 4, against the Indianapolis Colts, he scored his first NFL touchdown on an eight-yard reception from Ryan Tannehill. As a rookie, he appeared in all 17 games and started eight. He finished with 32 receptions for 450 receiving yards, 3 rushing attempts for 2 yards, and three receiving touchdowns. He was named to the PFWA All-Rookie Team.

==== 2023 season ====
In the 2023 season, he appeared in all 17 games and made 11 starts. He finished with 54 receptions for 528 receiving yards, two rushing attempts for six yards, and one receiving touchdown.

==== 2024 season ====
On a Week 12 road game against the Houston Texans, Okonkwo caught a career-high 70-yard touchdown in the fourth quarter, leading the Titans to a 32–27 upset. He finished the 2024 season with 52 receptions for 479 yards and two touchdowns.

=== Washington Commanders ===
On March 12, 2026, Okonkwo signed a three-year, $30 million contract with the Washington Commanders.

== NFL career statistics ==
Legend
**Bold**	Career high

=== Regular season ===
Year	Team	Games		Receiving					Rushing					Fumbles			Tackles		
Year	Team	GP	GS	Rec	Yds	Avg	Lng	TD	Att	Yds	Avg	Lng	TD	Fum	Lost	FR	Cmb	Solo	Ast
2022	TEN	**17**	8	32	450	**14.1**	48	**3**	**3**	2	0.7	6	0	0	0	0	**7**	**5**	**2**
2023	TEN	**17**	11	54	528	9.8	39	1	2	6	3.0	4	0	0	0	**1**	1	0	1
2024	TEN	**17**	11	52	479	9.2	**70**	2	1	**17**	**17.0**	**17**	0	**2**	**1**	0	4	3	1
2025	TEN	**17**	**12**	**56**	**560**	10.0	43	2	0	0	0.0	0	0	0	0	0	0	0	0
Career		68	42	194	2,017	10.4	70	8	6	25	4.2	17	0	2	1	1	12	8	4
