= Brandon Crenshaw-Dickson =

American football player (born 2001)

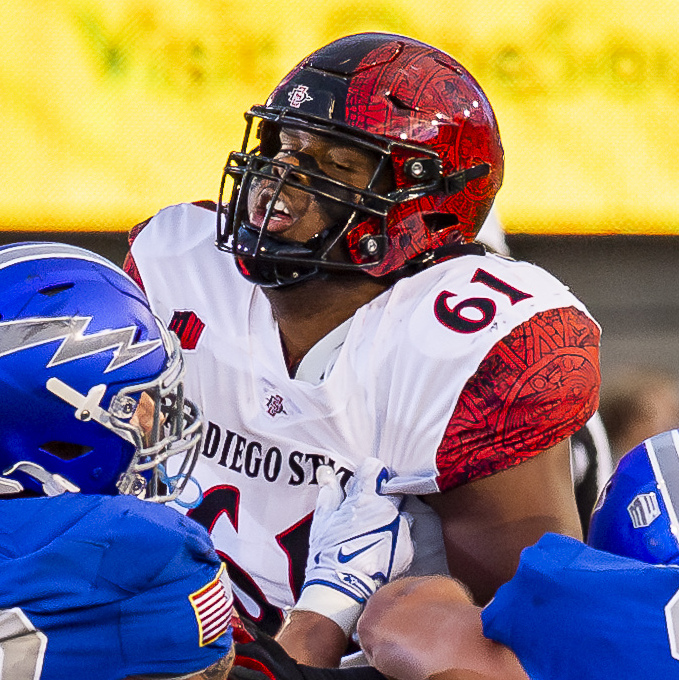
- Crenshaw-Dickson with San Diego State in 2023

No. 78 – Tennessee Titans
- Position: Offensive tackle
- Roster status: Active

Personal information
- Born: February 22, 2001 (age 25); Los Angeles, California, U.S.
- Listed height: 6 ft 7 in (2.01 m)
- Listed weight: 316 lb (143 kg)

Career information
- High school: Narbonne (Harbor City, California)
- College: San Diego State (2019–2023); Florida (2024)
- NFL draft: 2025: undrafted

Career history
- Tennessee Titans (2025–present)

Career NFL statistics as of 2025
- Games played: 4
- Games started: 1
- Stats at Pro Football Reference

Brandon Crenshaw-Dickson (born February 22, 2001) is an American professional football offensive tackle for the Tennessee Titans of the National Football League (NFL). He played college football for the San Diego State Aztecs and Florida Gators.

== Early life and college career ==
Crenshaw-Dickson was born on February 22, 2001, and grew up in Inglewood, California. He attended Narbonne High School in Harbor City where he played football as an offensive tackle, recording 12 pancake blocks as a senior. A three-star recruit, he committed to play college football for the San Diego State Aztecs.

Crenshaw-Dickson redshirted as a freshman at San Diego State in 2019 and was named the team's Offensive Scout Player of the Year. He played in one game during the 2020 season before winning the starting nod at right tackle in 2021. He started all 14 games in the 2021 season and then 12 of 13 games in 2022 after moving to left tackle. In 2023, he started nine games – five as a left tackle and four as a right tackle. Crenshaw-Dickson concluded his stint at San Diego State with 35 games started before transferring to the Florida Gators for his final season in 2024. With the Gators, he started 11 games at right tackle, finishing his collegiate career with 46 games started.

== Professional career ==
Pre-draft measurables
Height	Weight	Arm length	Hand span	Wingspan	40-yard dash	10-yard split	20-yard split	20-yard shuttle	Three-cone drill	Vertical jump	Broad jump	Bench press
6 ft 7 1/4 in (2.01 m)	316 lb (143 kg)	34 in (0.86 m)	10 1/2 in (0.27 m)	6 ft 11 1/2 in (2.12 m)	5.33 s	1.87 s	3.09 s	4.80 s	7.72 s	24.5 in (0.62 m)	8 ft 0 in (2.44 m)	15 reps
All values from NFL Combine/Pro Day

After going unselected in the 2025 NFL draft, Crenshaw-Dickson signed with the Tennessee Titans as an undrafted free agent. He made the team's 53-man roster for the 2025 season. He was waived on September 13, 2025 and re-signed to the practice squad two days later. On September 26, Crenshaw-Dickson was promoted to the active roster.
