= Marcus Harris (cornerback) =

American football player (born 2001)

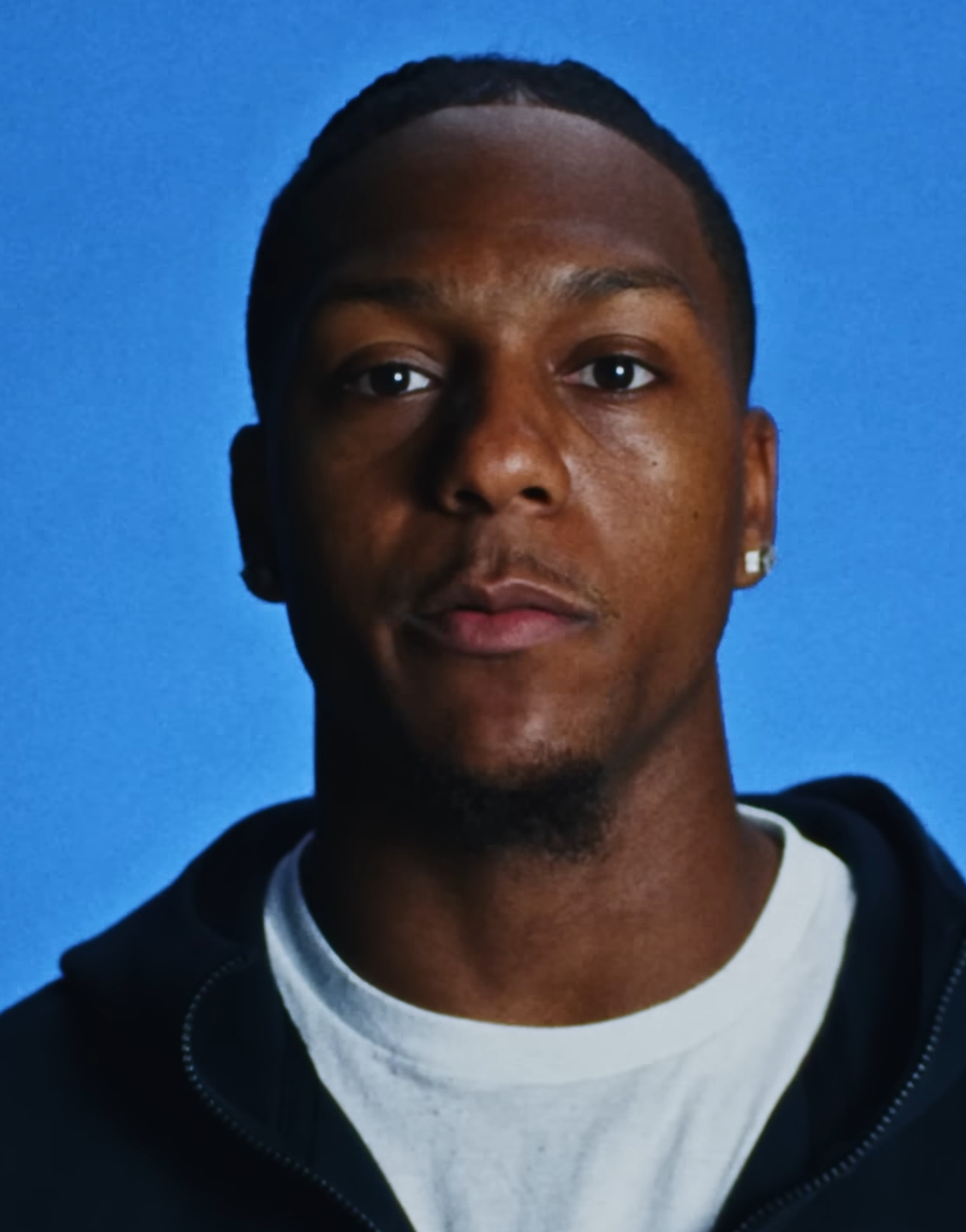
- Harris in 2025

No. 26 – Tennessee Titans
- Position: Cornerback
- Roster status: Active

Personal information
- Born: March 6, 2001 (age 25); Portland, Oregon, U.S.
- Listed height: 5 ft 11 in (1.80 m)
- Listed weight: 188 lb (85 kg)

Career information
- High school: Grant (Portland)
- College: Oregon State (2019–2020); Idaho (2021–2023); California (2024)
- NFL draft: 2025: 6th round, 183rd overall pick

Career history
- Tennessee Titans (2025–present)

Awards and highlights
- First-team All-Big Sky (2023); Second-team All-Big Sky (2022)

Career NFL statistics as of 2025
- Tackles: 28
- Forced fumbles: 1
- Pass deflections: 5
- Stats at Pro Football Reference

Marcus Harris (born March 6, 2001) is an American professional football cornerback for the Tennessee Titans of the National Football League (NFL). He played college football for the California Golden Bears, Idaho Vandals, and Oregon State Beavers. Harris was selected by the Titans in the sixth round of the 2025 NFL draft.

== Early life ==
Harris attended Grant High School located in Portland, Oregon. Coming out of high school, he was rated as a two star recruit, where he committed to play college football for the Oregon State Beavers.

== College career ==
Harris did not play in any games in his lone season at Oregon State in 2019, after which he entered his name into the NCAA transfer portal.

Harris transferred to play for the Idaho Vandals. During his time at Idaho, he notched 154 tackles with nine going for a loss, six interceptions, and a program record 36 pass deflections. He was also named second-team all-Big Sky in 2022 and first-team all-Big Sky in 2023. After the 2023 season, Harris entered his name into the NCAA transfer portal once again.

Harris transferred to play for the California Golden Bears.

== Professional career ==
Pre-draft measurables
Height	Weight	Arm length	Hand span	Wingspan	40-yard dash	10-yard split	20-yard split	20-yard shuttle	Three-cone drill	Vertical jump	Broad jump
5 ft 10 3/4 in (1.80 m)	189 lb (86 kg)	29 3/4 in (0.76 m)	8 7/8 in (0.23 m)	6 ft 3 in (1.91 m)	4.40 s	1.55 s	2.61 s	4.25 s	7.13 s	36.5 in (0.93 m)	10 ft 0 in (3.05 m)
All values from NFL Combine/Pro Day

Harris was selected by the Tennessee Titans with the 183rd overall pick of the sixth round in the 2025 NFL draft. He made 14 appearances (five starts) for Tennessee during his rookie campaign, recording five pass deflections, one forced fumble, and 28 combined tackles. On December 27, 2025, Harris was placed on season-ending injured reserve due to a knee injury suffered in Week 16 against the Kansas City Chiefs.
