= 2026 Jacksonville Jaguars season =

32nd season in franchise history

- Owner: Shahid Khan
- General manager: James Gladstone
- President: Mark Lamping
- Head coach: Liam Coen
- Offensive coordinator: Grant Udinski
- Defensive coordinator: Anthony Campanile
- Home stadium: EverBank Stadium

Results
- Record: 7–2
- Division place: 1st AFC South

Uniform
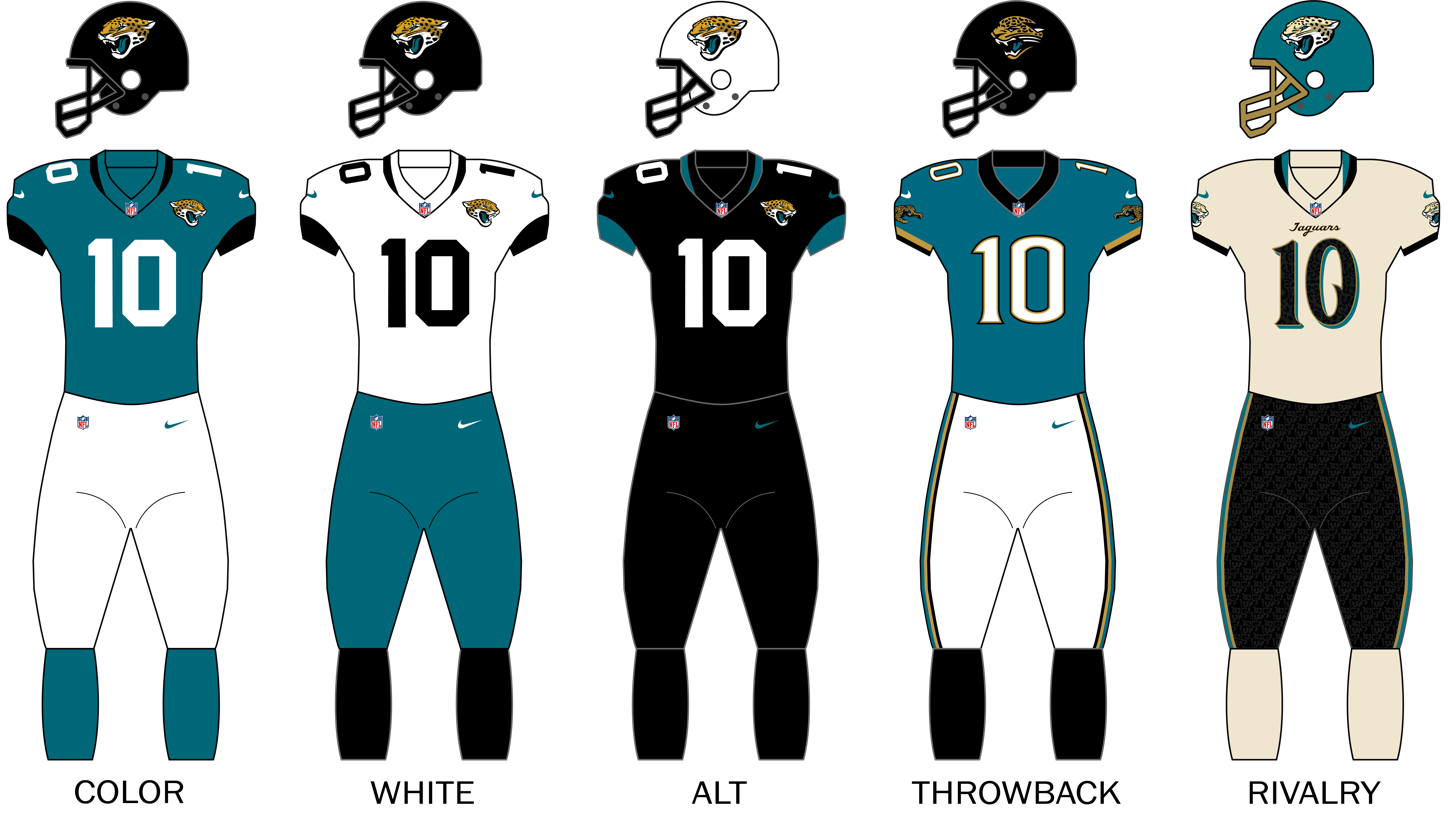

The 2026 season is the Jacksonville Jaguars' 32nd in the National Football League (NFL) and their second under the tandem of general manager James Gladstone and head coach Liam Coen. The team is looking to improve upon their 13–4 record from the previous season, as well as win divisional titles and make the playoffs in consecutive seasons for the first time since 1998 and 1999. The Jaguars will play in 12 different stadiums, making them the first team to do so since the 1926 Duluth Eskimos.

== Offseason ==
=== Draft ===
2026 Jacksonville Jaguars draft selections
Round	Selection	Player	Position	College	Notes
1	24	Traded to the Cleveland Browns (Note: The Jaguars traded a 2025 first-round selection (5th overall), a 2025 second-round selection (36th overall), a 2025 fourth-round selection (126th overall) and a 2026 first-round selection (24th overall) to the Cleveland Browns in exchange for a 2025 first-round selection (2nd overall), a 2025 fourth-round selection (104th overall) and a 2025 sixth-round selection (200th overall).)			
2	56	Nate Boerkircher	TE	Texas A&M	
3	81	Albert Regis	DT	Texas A&M	From Lions (Note: The Jaguars traded 2025 third- and sixth-round selections and a 2026 sixth-round selection to the Detroit Lions in exchange for a 2025 third-round selection and two 2025 third-round selection.)
3	88	Emmanuel Pregnon	G	Oregon	
3	100	Jalen Huskey	S	Maryland	From Lions
4	117	Traded to the Las Vegas Raiders (Note: The Jaguars traded a fourth-round selection and a sixth-round selection to Las Vegas in exchange for WR Jakobi Meyers.)			From Vikings (Note: The Jaguars traded OT Cam Robinson and a conditional seventh-round selection to Minnesota in exchange for a conditional fifth-round selection. The fifth-round selection became a fourth-round selection after Robinson met playtime criteria.)
4	119	Wesley Williams	DE	Duke	From Carolina (Note: The Jaguars traded a fourth-round selection and a fifth-round selection to Carolina in exchange for a fourth-round selection and a sixth-round selection.)
4	124	Traded to the Carolina Panthers			
5	164	Tanner Koziol	TE	Houston	
5	166	Traded to the Carolina Panthers			From Eagles (Note: The Jaguars traded RB/KR Tank Bigsby to Philadelphia in exchange for a fifth-round selection and a sixth-round selection.)
6	182	Traded to the Las Vegas Raiders			From Browns (Note: The Jaguars traded a seventh-round selection and CB Tyson Campbell to Cleveland in exchange for a sixth-round selection and CB Greg Newsome II.)
6	191	Josh Cameron	WR	Baylor	From Patriots (Note: The Jaguars traded a sixth-round selection and a seventh-round selection to New England in exchange for a sixth-round selection.)
6	196	Traded to the New England Patriots			From Panthers
6	203	CJ Williams	WR	Stanford	From Eagles
6	205	Traded to the Detroit Lions (Note: The Jaguars traded a sixth-round selection to Detroit in exchange for WR Tim Patrick.)			
6	213	Traded to the Detroit Lions			From Seahawks (Note: The Jaguars traded DT Roy Robertson-Harris to Seattle in exchange for a sixth-round selection.)
7	233	Zach Durfee	DE	Washington	From Lions (Note: The Jaguars traded K Riley Patterson to Detroit in exchange for a conditional seventh-round selection.)
7	239	Traded to the Cleveland Browns			From Eagles (Note: The Jaguars traded OT Fred Johnson to Philadelphia in exchange for a seventh-round selection.)
7	240	Parker Hughes	LB	Middle Tennessee	
7	245	Traded to the New England Patriots			From Texans (Note: The Jaguars traded WR Christian Kirk to Houston in exchange for a seventh-round selection.)

=== Undrafted free agents ===
2026 Jacksonville Jaguars undrafted free agents
Name	Position	College	Ref.
Joey Aguilar	QB	Tennessee	
T. J. Bollers	DL	California	
Brady Boyd	WR	Utah State	
Alex Bullock	WR	South Dakota State	
Ethan Conner	TE	Troy	
Garrett DiGiorgio	OL	UCLA	
Quindarius Dunnigan	DE	Michigan State	
Preston Hodge	CB	Colorado	
Jalen Hunt	DL	Cincinnati	
Devon Marshall	CB	NC State	
Devin Neal	S	Virginia	
Jimto Obidegwu	OL	North Texas	
Ben Patterson	WR	UT Permian Basin	
Trebor Peña	WR	Penn State	
J'Mari Taylor	RB	Virginia	
Bryan Thomas Jr.	DE	South Carolina	
Jordan White	OL	Vanderbilt	
Michael Wortham	WR	Montana	

Draft trades

== Staff ==
Jacksonville Jaguars staff
Front office: Owner – Shahid Khan; President – Mark Lamping; Executive vice president of football operations – Tony Boselli; General manager – James Gladstone; Senior advisor to the general manager – Brian Xanders; Senior advisor to the general manager – JW Jordan; Director of college scouting – Brian Hill; Senior personnel executive – Regis Eller; Personnel executive – John Stevenson, Ricky Thomas Jr., Ryan Stamper; Director of pro scouting – DeJuan Polk; Senior director of football strategy and game management – Jon Dykema; Senior vice president of football analytics – Jake Temme; Director of player finance – Trip MacCracken; Chief football strategy officer – Tony Khan; Head coaches: Head coach – Liam Coen; Assistant head coach/Pass game coordinator – Shane Waldron; Associate head coach/Special teams coordinator – Heath Farwell; Offensive coaches: Offensive coordinator – Grant Udinski; Run game coordinator – Brian Picucci; Quarterbacks – Spencer Whipple; Running backs – Chad Morton; Wide receivers – Edgar Bennett; Assistant wide receivers – Tyler Tettleton; Tight ends – Richard Angulo; Offensive line – Shaun Sarrett; Pass game specialist – John Van Dam; Offensive assistant – Trevor Mendelson; Offensive assistant – Fred Walker	Defensive coaches: Defensive coordinator – Anthony Campanile; Defensive pass game coordinator – Mathieu Araujo; Defensive line – Matt Edwards; Assistant defensive line – Derrick LeBlanc; Linebackers – Tem Lukabu; Assistant linebackers – Kevin Wilkins; Defensive backs – Anthony Perkins; Assistant defensive backs – Drew Lascari; Defensive assistant – Grant Morgan; Senior defensive assistant – Bill Sheridan; Special teams coaches: Assistant special teams – Luke Thompson; Strength and conditioning: Head strength and conditioning coach – Eric Ciano; Assistant strength and conditioning coach – Paul Jackson; Assistant strength and conditioning coach – Lanier Coleman; → Coaching staff → Front office → More NFL staffs

== Current roster ==
Jacksonville Jaguars roster
Quarterbacks (QB): 10 Quinn Ewers; 16 Trevor Lawrence; Running backs (RB): 20 Ameer Abdullah; 5 LeQuint Allen; 24 Chris Rodriguez Jr.; 33 Bhayshul Tuten KR; Wide receivers (WR): 19 Josh Cameron; 12 Travis Hunter WR/CB; 3 Jakobi Meyers; 7 Brian Thomas Jr.; 11 Parker Washington PR; 18 CJ Williams; Tight ends (TE): 87 Nate Boerkircher; 88 Tanner Koziol; 80 Quintin Morris; 85 Brenton Strange	Offensive linemen (OL): 76 Ezra Cleveland G; 68 Daniel Faalele G; 73 Robert Hainsey C; 72 Walker Little T; 64 Wyatt Milum G; 60 Jonah Monheim C; 75 Emmanuel Pregnon G; 70 Cole Van Lanen T; Defensive linemen (DL): 91 Arik Armstead DT; 90 Jordan Davis DT; 93 Matt Dickerson DT; 94 Davon Godchaux DT; 41 Josh Hines-Allen DE; 99 Ruke Orhorhoro DT; 98 Albert Regis DT; 92 Danny Striggow DE; 57 Bryan Thomas Jr. DE; 44 Travon Walker DE; 97 Wesley Williams DE	Linebackers (LB): 50 Branson Combs; 47 Dennis Gardeck; 35 Jalen McLeod; 51 Ventrell Miller; 23 Foyesade Oluokun; 31 Jahlani Tavai; Defensive backs (DB): 0 Jessie Bates S; 1 Montaric Brown CB; 22 Jalen Huskey S; 6 Antonio Johnson S; 4 Jarrian Jones CB; 36 Jaylon Jones CB; 25 Rayuan Lane III S; 2 Jourdan Lewis CB; 26 Kaevon Merriweather S; Special teams (ST): 9 Logan Cooke P; 39 Cam Little K; 46 Ross Matiscik LS	Practice squad: 83 Brenden Bates TE; 96 T. J. Bollers DT; 79 Geron Christian T; 66 Eli Cox C; 54 Jamal Hill LB; 21 Alijah Huzzie CB; 55 Austin Johnson DT; 13 Tim Jones WR; 37 Jabbar Muhammad CB; 14 Nick Mullens QB; 56 BJ Ojulari DE; 86 Trebor Peña WR; 42 Cam'Ron Silmon-Craig S; 30 J'Mari Taylor RB; 81 Austin Trammell WR; 15 Michael Wortham WR; 78 Kilian Zierer T (IPP); Reserve: 45 Jared Bartlett LB (IR); 74 Garrett DiGiorgio G (IR); 58 Zach Durfee DE (IR/DFR); 95 B. J. Green DE (IR/DFR); 52 DaVon Hamilton DT (IR); 77 Anton Harrison T (IR/DFR); 53 Parker Hughes LB (IR); 65 Patrick Mekari G (IR/DFR); 29 Eric Murray S (IR); 69 Sam Mustipher C (IR); 27 Caleb Ransaw S (IR/DFR) 53 active, 16 practice squad (1 IPP), 11 reserve As of November 14, 2026. Rookies in italics.; Roster; Depth chart; Transactions

== Preseason ==
Week	Date	Opponent	Result	Record	Venue	Recap
1	August 15	at New Orleans Saints	W 24–20	1–0	Caesars Superdome	Recap
2	August 21	Carolina Panthers	L 17–34	1–1	EverBank Stadium	Recap
3	August 28	Tampa Bay Buccaneers	W 19–0	2−1	EverBank Stadium	Recap

== Regular season ==
=== Schedule ===
Week	Date	Time (ET)	Opponent	Result	Record	Venue	Network	Recap
1	September 13	1:00 p.m.	Cleveland Browns	**W** 34–10	1–0	EverBank Stadium	CBS	Recap
2	September 20	4:05 p.m.	at Denver Broncos	**L** 13–20	1–1	Empower Field at Mile High	CBS	Recap
3	September 27	1:00 p.m.	New England Patriots	**W** 35–6	2–1	EverBank Stadium	CBS	Recap
4	October 4	1:00 p.m.	at Cincinnati Bengals	**W** 22–17	3–1	Paycor Stadium	CBS	Recap
5	October 11	9:30 a.m.	Philadelphia Eagles	**W** 19–17	4–1	(United Kingdom) Tottenham Hotspur Stadium (London)	NFLN	Recap
6	October 18	9:30 a.m.	**Houston Texans**	**L** 31–34	4–2	(United Kingdom) Wembley Stadium (London)	NFLN	Recap
7	Bye							
8	November 1	1:00 p.m.	**Indianapolis Colts**	**W** 42–7	5–2	EverBank Stadium	CBS	Recap
9	November 5	8:15 p.m.	at Baltimore Ravens	**W** 33–10	6–2	M&T Bank Stadium	Prime Video	Recap
10	November 15	1:00 p.m.	at **Tennessee Titans**	**W** 40–23	7–2	Nissan Stadium	Fox	Recap
11	November 22	4:25 p.m.	at New York Giants			MetLife Stadium	CBS	
12	November 29	1:00 p.m.	**Tennessee Titans**			EverBank Stadium	Fox	
13	December 6	1:00 p.m.	at Chicago Bears			Soldier Field	Fox	
14	December 14	8:15 p.m.	Pittsburgh Steelers			EverBank Stadium	ESPN	
15	December 20	1:00 p.m.	at **Houston Texans**			Reliant Stadium	CBS	
16	December 27	8:20 p.m.	at Dallas Cowboys			AT&T Stadium	NBC	
17	January 2/3	TBD	Washington Commanders			EverBank Stadium	TBD	
18	January 9/10	TBD	at **Indianapolis Colts**			Lucas Oil Stadium	TBD	

Notes

- Intra-division opponents are in **bold** text.
- Networks, dates and times from Weeks 13–16 are subject to change as a result of flexible scheduling.
- The date, time and network for Week 17 will be finalized no later than the end of Week 15.
- The date, time and network for Week 18 will be finalized at the end of Week 17.
- Week 12 was flexed from 4:05 p.m. to 1:00 p.m. on November 17, 2026.

=== Game summaries ===
==== Week 1: vs. Cleveland Browns ====
Week 1: Cleveland Browns at Jacksonville Jaguars – Game summary

Quarter	1	2	3	4	Total
Browns	0	0	3	7	**10**
**Jaguars**	14	10	10	0	**34**

at EverBank Stadium, Jacksonville, Florida

- Date: September 13
- Game time: 1:00 p.m. EDT
- Game weather: 89 °F (32 °C)
- Game attendance: 41,156
- Referee: Craig Wrolstad
- TV announcers (CBS): Tom McCarthy, Robert Turbin and Tiffany Blackmon
- Recap, Game Book

Game information

**First quarter**

- JAX – Parker Washington 30-yard pass from Trevor Lawrence (Cam Little kick), 8:11. Jaguars 7–0. **Drive: 8 plays, 59 yards, 3:55.**
- JAX – Josh Cameron 4-yard pass from Trevor Lawrence (Cam Little kick), 1:42. Jaguars 14–0. **Drive: 9 plays, 74 yards, 4:42.**

**Second quarter**

- JAX – Cam Little 47-yard field goal, 9:09. Jaguars 17–0. **Drive: 11 plays, 43 yards, 5:43.**
- JAX – Brenton Strange 14-yard pass from Trevor Lawrence (Cam Little kick), 6:18. Jaguars 24–0. **Drive: 5 plays, 44 yards, 2:09.**

**Third quarter**

- JAX – Jakobi Meyers 32-yard pass from Trevor Lawrence (Cam Little kick), 12:08. Jaguars 31–0. **Drive: 4 plays, 60 yards, 2:52.**
- CLE – Andre Szmyt 26-yard field goal, 8:31. Jaguars 31–3. **Drive: 7 plays, 15 yards, 3:37.**
- JAX – Cam Little 40-yard field goal, 1:48. Jaguars 34–3. **Drive: 10 plays, 47 yards, 6:43.**

**Fourth quarter**

- CLE – Denzel Boston 46-yard pass from Deshaun Watson (Andre Szmyt kick), 1:52. Jaguars 34–10. **Drive: 6 plays, 89 yards, 2:47.**

**Top passers**

- CLE – Deshaun Watson – 16/22, 205 yards, TD, INT
- JAX – Trevor Lawrence – 18/23, 245 yards, 4 TD

**Top rushers**

- CLE – Deshaun Watson – 6 rushes, 38 yards
- JAX – Bhayshul Tuten – 15 rushes, 66 yards

**Top receivers**

- CLE – Denzel Boston – 2 receptions, 59 yards, TD
- JAX – Parker Washington – 5 receptions, 83 yards, TD

==== Week 2: at Denver Broncos ====
Week 2: Jacksonville Jaguars at Denver Broncos – Game summary

Quarter	1	2	3	4	Total
Jaguars	0	10	3	0	**13**
**Broncos**	0	3	3	14	**20**

at Empower Field at Mile High, Denver, Colorado

- Date: September 20
- Game time: 4:05 p.m. EDT/2:05 p.m. MDT
- Game weather: Partly cloudy, 73 °F (23 °C)
- Game attendance: 76,472
- Referee: John Hussey
- TV announcers (CBS): Ian Eagle, Ross Tucker and Evan Washburn
- Recap, Game Book

Game information

**First quarter**

- No scoring plays.

**Second quarter**

- JAX – Bhayshul Tuten 1-yard run (Cam Little kick), 12:13. Jaguars 7–0. **Drive: 8 plays, 72 yards, 4:52.**
- DEN – Wil Lutz 20-yard field goal, 7:01. Jaguars 7–3. **Drive: 8 plays, 58 yards, 5:12.**
- JAX – Cam Little 44-yard field goal, 0:00. Jaguars 10–3. **Drive: 7 plays, 54 yards, 2:08.**

**Third quarter**

- JAX – Cam Little 23-yard field goal, 9:02. Jaguars 13–3. **Drive: 11 plays, 64 yards, 5:58.**
- DEN – Wil Lutz 45-yard field goal, 4:58. Jaguars 13–6. **Drive: 8 plays, 45 yards, 4:04.**

**Fourth quarter**

- DEN – Nate Adkins 7-yard pass from Bo Nix (Wil Lutz kick), 11:47. Tied 13–13. **Drive: 10 plays, 64 yards, 4:46.**
- DEN – Jonah Coleman 3-yard run (Wil Lutz kick), 7:21. Broncos 20–13. **Drive: 5 plays, 56 yards, 2:21.**

**Top passers**

- JAX – Trevor Lawrence – 17/29, 189 yards, INT
- DEN – Bo Nix – 22/31, 288 yards, TD, INT

**Top rushers**

- JAX – Bhayshul Tuten – 13 rushes, 65 yards, TD
- DEN – Jonah Coleman – 10 rushes, 39 yards, TD

**Top receivers**

- JAX – Parker Washington – 7 receptions, 98 yards
- DEN – Jaylen Waddle – 8 receptions, 138 yards

==== Week 3: vs. New England Patriots ====
Week 3: New England Patriots at Jacksonville Jaguars – Game summary

Quarter	1	2	3	4	Total
Patriots	0	3	0	3	**6**
**Jaguars**	0	14	14	7	**35**

at EverBank Stadium, Jacksonville, Florida

- Date: September 27
- Game time: 1:00 p.m. EDT
- Game weather: 80 °F (27 °C)
- Game attendance: 42,156
- Referee: Alex Kemp
- TV announcers (CBS): Spero Dedes, Adam Archuleta and Aditi Kinkhabwala
- Recap, Game Book

Game information

**First quarter**

- No scoring plays.

**Second quarter**

- JAX – Josh Cameron 12-yard pass from Trevor Lawrence (Cam Little kick), 13:25. Jaguars 7–0. **Drive: 10 plays, 62 yards, 5:27.**
- NE – Andy Borregales 35-yard field goal, 9:09. Jaguars 7–3. **Drive: 4 plays, 4 yards, 1:55.**
- JAX – Jakobi Meyers 10-yard pass from Trevor Lawrence (Cam Little kick), 4:23. Jaguars 14–3. **Drive: 9 plays, 65 yards, 4:46.**

**Third quarter**

- JAX – Parker Washington 17-yard pass from Trevor Lawrence (Cam Little kick), 1:08. Jaguars 21–3. **Drive: 15 plays, 72 yards, 8:42.**
- JAX – Chris Rodriguez Jr. 5-yard run (Cam Little kick), 0:50. Jaguars 28–3. **Drive: 1 play, 5 yards, 0:04.**

**Fourth quarter**

- NE – Andy Borregales 40-yard field goal, 13:17. Jaguars 28–6. **Drive: 9 plays, 69 yards, 2:33.**
- JAX – Bhayshul Tuten 1-yard run (Cam Little kick), 8:02. Jaguars 35–6. **Drive: 8 plays, 49 yards, 5:15.**

**Top passers**

- NE – Drake Maye – 14/25, 199 yards, 2 INT
- JAX – Trevor Lawrence – 19/29, 182 yards, 3 TD, INT

**Top rushers**

- NE – TreVeyon Henderson – 8 rushes, 23 yards
- JAX – Bhayshul Tuten – 15 rushes, 73 yards, TD

**Top receivers**

- NE – Mack Hollins – 6 receptions, 87 yards
- JAX – Jakobi Meyers – 7 receptions, 64 yards, TD

==== Week 4: at Cincinnati Bengals ====
Week 4: Jacksonville Jaguars at Cincinnati Bengals – Game summary

Quarter	1	2	3	4	Total
**Jaguars**	3	10	3	6	**22**
Bengals	0	3	7	7	**17**

at Paycor Stadium, Cincinnati, Ohio

- Date: October 4
- Game time: 1:00 p.m. EDT
- Game weather: Sunny, 70 °F (21 °C)
- Game attendance: 66,625
- Referee: Alex Moore
- TV announcers (CBS): Tom McCarthy, Robert Turbin and Tiffany Blackmon
- Recap, Game Book

Game information

**First quarter**

- JAX – Cam Little 55-yard field goal, 2:18. Jaguars 3–0. **Drive: 9 plays, 44 yards, 5:25.**

**Second quarter**

- CIN – Evan McPherson 29-yard field goal, 10:03. Tied 3–3. **Drive: 14 plays, 67 yards, 7:15.**
- JAX – Cam Little 28-yard field goal, 4:16. Jaguars 6–3. **Drive: 12 plays, 63 yards, 5:47.**
- JAX – Brian Thomas Jr. 7-yard pass from Trevor Lawrence (Cam Little kick), 1:23. Jaguars 13–3. **Drive: 4 plays, 18 yards, 0:26.**

**Third quarter**

- CIN – Mike Gesicki 15-yard pass from Joe Burrow (Evan McPherson kick), 8:44. Jaguars 13–10. **Drive: 12 plays, 67 yards, 6:16.**
- JAX – Cam Little 54-yard field goal, 3:00. Jaguars 16–10. **Drive: 10 plays, 39 yards, 5:44.**

**Fourth quarter**

- JAX – Chris Rodriguez Jr. 25-yard run (pass failed), 6:35. Jaguars 22–10. **Drive: 7 plays, 76 yards, 3:54.**
- CIN – Joe Burrow 1-yard run (Evan McPherson kick), 3:28. Jaguars 22–17. **Drive: 9 plays, 71 yards, 3:07.**

**Top passers**

- JAX – Trevor Lawrence – 18/23, 227 yards, TD
- CIN – Joe Burrow – 39/54, 428 yards, TD, 2 INT

**Top rushers**

- JAX – Bhayshul Tuten – 17 rushes, 73 yards
- CIN – Chase Brown – 9 rushes, 10 yards

**Top receivers**

- JAX – Brenton Strange – 7 receptions, 95 yards
- CIN – Tee Higgins – 11 receptions, 157 yards

==== Week 5: vs. Philadelphia Eagles ====
NFL London Game

Week 5: Philadelphia Eagles at Jacksonville Jaguars – Game summary

Quarter	1	2	3	4	Total
Eagles	0	14	0	3	**17**
**Jaguars**	7	0	3	9	**19**

at Tottenham Hotspur Stadium, London, England

- Date: October 11
- Game time: 2:30 p.m. BST/9:30 a.m. EDT
- Game weather: Mostly sunny, 60 °F (16 °C)
- Game attendance: 61,322
- Referee: Ronald Torbert
- TV announcers (WFOX/NFLN): Dave Pasch, Kurt Warner, Jason Kelce and Molly McGrath
- Recap, Game Book

Game information

**First quarter**

- JAX – Parker Washington 51-yard pass from Trevor Lawrence (Cam Little kick), 5:26. Jaguars 7–0. **Drive: 3 plays, 63 yards, 1:26.**

**Second quarter**

- PHI – Will Shipley 2-yard run (Jake Elliott kick), 8:46. Tied 7–7. **Drive: 13 plays, 74 yards, 7:27.**
- PHI – Darius Cooper 62-yard pass from Jalen Hurts (Jake Elliott kick), 5:31. Eagles 14–7. **Drive: 3 plays, 62 yards, 0:55.**

**Third quarter**

- JAX – Cam Little 34-yard field goal, 7:11. Eagles 14–10. **Drive: 11 plays 69 yards, 6:20.**

**Fourth quarter**

- JAX – Parker Washington 27-yard pass from Trevor Lawrence (kick failed), 3:20. Jaguars 16–14. **Drive: 5 plays, 51 yards, 2:07.**
- PHI – Jake Elliott 48-yard field goal, 0:08. Eagles 17–16. **Drive: 9 plays, 32 yards, 1:27.**
- JAX – Cam Little 57-yard field goal, 0:00. Jaguars 19–17. **Drive: 1 play, 0 yards, 0:08.**

**Top passers**

- PHI – Jalen Hurts – 21/40, 220 yards, TD
- JAX – Trevor Lawrence – 24/39, 331 yards, 2 TD, INT

**Top rushers**

- PHI – Dameon Pierce – 11 rushes, 14 yards
- JAX – Bhayshul Tuten – 22 rushes, 72 yards

**Top receivers**

- PHI – Darius Cooper – 2 receptions, 71 yards, TD
- JAX – Parker Washington – 6 receptions, 124 yards, 2 TD

After Eagles kicker Jake Elliott kicked a potential game-winning field goal with eight seconds remaining, Jaguars return specialist Ameer Abdullah returned the final kickoff 53 yards with one second left. Cam Little then converted the game-winning field goal.

==== Week 6: vs. Houston Texans ====
NFL London Game

Week 6: Houston Texans at Jacksonville Jaguars – Game summary

Quarter	1	2	3	4	Total
**Texans**	7	10	14	3	**34**
Jaguars	0	14	7	10	**31**

at Wembley Stadium, London, England

- Date: October 18
- Game time: 2:30 p.m. BST/9:30 a.m. EDT
- Game weather: Rain, 58 °F (14 °C)
- Game attendance: 82,497
- Referee: Shawn Hochuli
- TV announcers (WFOX/NFLN): Bob Wischusen, Louis Riddick and Molly McGrath
- Recap, Game Book

Game information

**First quarter**

- HOU – Foster Moreau 6-yard pass from C. J. Stroud (Ka'imi Fairbairn kick), 5:13. Texans 7–0. **Drive: 5 plays, 62 yards, 3:01.**

**Second quarter**

- JAX – Bhayshul Tuten 27-yard pass from Trevor Lawrence (Cam Little kick), 6:47. Tied 7–7. **Drive: 8 plays, 79 yards, 4:26.**
- HOU – Ka'imi Fairbairn 25-yard field goal, 4:16. Texans 10–7. **Drive: 7 plays, 62 yards, 2:31.**
- JAX – Bhayshul Tuten 2-yard pass from Trevor Lawrence (Cam Little kick), 0:55. Jaguars 14–10. **Drive: 9 plays, 48 yards, 3:21.**
- HOU – Foster Moreau 1-yard pass from C. J. Stroud (Ka'imi Fairbairn kick), 0:08. Texans 17–14. **Drive: 3 plays, 63 yards, 0:47.**

**Third quarter**

- HOU – Jaylin Noel 13-yard pass from C. J. Stroud (Ka'imi Fairbairn kick), 9:21. Texans 24–14. **Drive: 11 plays, 65 yards, 5:39.**
- JAX – Nate Boerkircher 1-yard pass from Trevor Lawrence (Cam Little kick), 2:34. Texans 24–21. **Drive: 6 plays, 69 yards, 2:57.**
- HOU – Jawhar Jordan 25-yard run (Ka'imi Fairbairn kick), 0:50. Texans 31–21. **Drive: 5 plays, 65 yards, 1:44.**

**Fourth quarter**

- JAX – Travis Hunter 7-yard pass from Trevor Lawrence (Cam Little kick), 11:26. Texans 31–28. **Drive: 9 plays, 61 yards, 4:24.**
- JAX – Cam Little 60-yard field goal, 1:55. Tied 31–31. **Drive: 7 plays, 38 yards, 1:58.**
- HOU – Ka'imi Fairbairn 49-yard field goal, 0:00. Texans 34–31. **Drive: 7 plays, 36 yards, 1:55.**

**Top passers**

- HOU – C. J. Stroud – 24/34, 312 yards, 3 TD, INT
- JAX – Trevor Lawrence – 24/41, 306 yards, 4 TD, INT

**Top rushers**

- HOU – Woody Marks – 15 rushes, 56 yards
- JAX – Chris Rodriguez Jr. – 11 rushes, 55 yards

**Top receivers**

- HOU – Jaylin Noel – 4 receptions, 107 yards, TD
- JAX – Jakobi Meyers – 5 receptions, 83 yards

==== Week 8: vs. Indianapolis Colts ====
Week 8: Indianapolis Colts at Jacksonville Jaguars – Game summary

Quarter	1	2	3	4	Total
Colts	0	0	7	0	**7**
**Jaguars**	7	21	14	0	**42**

at EverBank Stadium, Jacksonville, Florida

- Date: November 1
- Game time: 1:00 p.m. EST
- Game weather: Mostly cloudy, 78 °F (26 °C)
- Game attendance: 42,156
- Referee: Adrian Hill
- TV announcers (CBS): Spero Dedes, Adam Archuleta and Aditi Kinkhabwala
- Recap, Game Book

Game information

**First quarter**

- JAX – Brian Thomas Jr. 12-yard pass from Trevor Lawrence (Cam Little kick), 5:30. Jaguars 7–0. **Drive: 12 plays, 98 yards, 7:08.**

**Second quarter**

- JAX – Nate Boerkircher 31-yard pass from Trevor Lawrence (Cam Little kick), 7:14. Jaguars 14–0. **Drive: 4 plays, 50 yards, 1:51.**
- JAX – Bhayshul Tuten 39-yard run (Cam Little kick), 1:51. 'Jaguars 21–0. **Drive: 7 plays, 80 yards, 2:53.**
- JAX – Rayuan Lane III 92-yard interception return (Cam Little kick), 0:10. 'Jaguars 28–0. **Drive: 3 plays, 14 yards, 0:45.**

**Third quarter**

- JAX – Chris Rodriguez Jr. 28-yard rush (Cam Little kick), 9:08. 'Jaguars 35–0. **Drive: 3 plays, 37 yards, 1:22.**
- IND – Josh Downs 6-yard pass from Daniel Jones (Spencer Shrader kick), 3:59. Jaguars 35–7. **Drive: 10 plays, 65 yards, 5:09.**
- JAX – Bhayshul Tuten 25-yard pass from Trevor Lawrence (Cam Little kick), 0:00. 'Jaguars 42–7. **Drive: 6 plays, 83 yards, 3:59.**

**Fourth quarter**

- No scoring plays.

**Top passers**

- IND – Daniel Jones – 19/28, 144 yards, TD, 2 INT
- JAX – Trevor Lawrence – 10/14, 210 yards, 3 TD

**Top rushers**

- IND – DJ Giddens – 6 rushes, 43 yards
- JAX – Bhayshul Tuten – 16 rushes, 104 yards, TD

**Top receivers**

- IND – Keenan Allen – 7 receptions, 67 yards
- JAX – Bhayshul Tuten – 2 receptions, 55 yards, TD

==== Week 9: at Baltimore Ravens ====
Week 9: Jacksonville Jaguars at Baltimore Ravens – Game summary

Quarter	1	2	3	4	Total
**Jaguars**	10	7	3	13	**33**
Ravens	3	0	0	7	**10**

at M&T Bank Stadium, Baltimore, Maryland

- Date: November 5
- Game time: 8:15 p.m. EST
- Game weather: Rain, 70 °F (21 °C)
- Game attendance: 70,007
- Referee: Brad Allen
- TV announcers (WFOX/Prime Video): Al Michaels, Kirk Herbstreit and Kaylee Hartung
- Recap, Game Book

Game information

**First quarter**

- JAX – Bhayshul Tuten 1-yard run (Cam Little kick), 11:20. Jaguars 7–0. **Drive: 7 plays, 77 yards, 3:40.**
- BAL – Jake Moody 53-yard field goal, 6:31. Jaguars 7–3. **Drive: 8 plays, 30 yards, 4:49.**
- JAX – Cam Little 36-yard field goal, 2:00. Jaguars 10–3. **Drive: 10 plays, 47 yards, 4:31.**

**Second quarter**

- JAX – Parker Washington 50-yard pass from Trevor Lawrence (Cam Little kick), 0:58. Jaguars 17–3. **Drive: 4 plays, 80 yards, 1:06.**

**Third quarter**

- JAX – Cam Little 45-yard field goal, 12:48. Jaguars 20–3. **Drive: 4 plays, -1 yards, 0:55.**

**Fourth quarter**

- JAX – Cam Little 47-yard field goal, 13:35. Jaguars 23–3. **Drive: 8 plays, 30 yards, 4:27.**
- JAX – Cam Little 33-yard field goal, 11:52. Jaguars 26–3. **Drive: 4 plays, 8 yards, 1:30.**
- JAX – Chris Rodriguez Jr. 2-yard run (Cam Little kick), 7:26. Jaguars 33–3. **Drive: 8 plays, 32 yards, 4:20.**
- BAL – Justice Hill 65-yard run (Jake Moody kick), 7:15. Jaguars 33–10. **Drive: 1 play, 65 yards, 0:11.**

**Top passers**

- JAX – Trevor Lawrence – 16/26, 242 yards, TD
- BAL – Joe Fagnano – 10/18, 60 yards, 2 INT

**Top rushers**

- JAX – Ameer Abdullah – 7 rushes, 30 yards
- BAL – Justice Hill – 9 rushes, 85 yards, TD

**Top receivers**

- JAX – Jakobi Meyers – 4 receptions, 65 yards
- BAL – Mark Andrews – 2 receptions, 19 yards

==== Week 10: at Tennessee Titans ====
Week 10: Jacksonville Jaguars at Tennessee Titans – Game summary

Quarter	1	2	3	4	Total
**Jaguars**	7	9	7	17	**40**
Titans	3	7	6	7	**23**

at Nissan Stadium, Nashville, Tennessee

- Date: November 15
- Game time: 1:00 p.m. EST/12:00 p.m. CST
- Game weather: Sunny, 50 °F (10 °C)
- Game attendance: 61,239
- Referee: Barry Anderson
- TV announcers (Fox): Chris Myers, Mark Schlereth and Jen Hale
- Recap, Game Book

Game information

**First quarter**

- JAX – Parker Washington 2-yard pass from Trevor Lawrence (Cam Little kick), 9:33. Jaguars 7–0. **Drive: 10 plays, 60 yards, 5:27.**
- TEN – Joey Slye 53-yard field goal, 7:04. Jaguars 7–3. **Drive: 8 plays, 31 yards, 2:29.**

**Second quarter**

- JAX – Cam Little 46-yard field goal, 12:54. Jaguars 10–3. **Drive: 10 plays, 52 yards, 5:29.**
- JAX – Cam Little 48-yard field goal, 7:54. Jaguars 13–3. **Drive: 6 plays, 39 yards, 3:13.**
- TEN – Daniel Bellinger 2-yard pass from Cam Ward (Joey Slye kick), 5:06. Jaguars 13–10. **Drive: 6 plays, 67 yards, 2:48.**
- JAX – Cam Little 36-yard field goal, 0:00. Jaguars 16–10. **Drive: 7 plays, 65 yards, 0:58.**

**Third quarter**

- TEN – Joey Slye 54-yard field goal, 12:35. Jaguars 16–13. **Drive: 7 plays, 23 yards, 2:25.**
- JAX – Brenton Strange 3-yard pass from Trevor Lawrence (Cam Little kick), 6:28. Jaguars 23–13. **Drive: 10 plays, 71 yards, 6:07.**
- TEN – Joey Slye 50-yard field goal, 2:13. Jaguars 23–16. **Drive: 10 plays, 49 yards, 4:15.**

**Fourth quarter**

- JAX – Josh Cameron 25-yard pass from Trevor Lawrence (Cam Little kick), 9:44. Jaguars 30–16.
- TEN – Tony Pollard 32-yard pass from Cam Ward (Joey Slye kick), 8:21. Jaguars 30–23. **Drive: 4 plays, 65 yards, 1:23.**
- JAX – Cam Little 40-yard field goal, 4:31. Jaguars 33–23. **Drive: 8 plays, 42 yards, 3:50.**
- JAX – Bhayshul Tuten 6-yard run (Cam Little kick), 1:10. Jaguars 40–23. **Drive: 6 plays, 28 yards, 1:55**

**Top passers**

- JAX – Trevor Lawrence – 25/35, 352 yards, 3 TD, INT
- TEN – Cam Ward – 28/39, 231 yards, 2 TD, INT

**Top rushers**

- JAX – Bhayshul Tuten – 26 rushes, 88 yards, TD
- TEN – Cam Ward – 3 rushes, 39 yards

**Top receivers**

- JAX – Parker Washington – 7 receptions, 152 yards, TD
- TEN – Elic Ayomanor – 5 receptions, 79 yards

==== Week 11: at New York Giants ====
Week 11: Jacksonville Jaguars at New York Giants – Game summary

Quarter	1	2	3	4	Total
Jaguars	0	0	0	0	**0**
Giants	0	0	0	0	**0**

at MetLife Stadium, East Rutherford, New Jersey

- Date: November 22
- Game time: 4:25 p.m. EST
- Referee: Craig Wrolstad
- TV announcers (CBS): Jim Nantz, J.J. Watt and Tracy Wolfson
- Preview

=== Standings ===
==== Division ====
AFC South
	W	L	T	PCT	DIV	CONF	PF	PA	STK
Jacksonville Jaguars	7	2	0	.778	2–1	6–2	269	144	W3
Houston Texans	4	6	0	.400	3–1	4–4	259	222	W1
Indianapolis Colts	3	8	0	.273	1–3	2–6	211	297	L1
Tennessee Titans	1	9	0	.100	1–2	1–6	197	290	L4

==== Conference ====
AFC
Seed	Team	Division	W	L	T	PCT	DIV	CONF	SOS	SOV	STK
**Division leaders**
1	Buffalo Bills	East	9	1	0	.900	2–1	6–1	.424	.416	W6
2	Kansas City Chiefs	West	8	2	0	.800	3–1	6–1	.374	.300	W3
3 (Note: Jacksonville wins tie break over Cincinnati based on head-to-head victory.)	Jacksonville Jaguars	South	7	2	0	.778	2–1	6–2	.444	.408	W3
4	Cincinnati Bengals	North	7	2	0	.778	2–1	5–2	.389	.310	W5
**Wild cards**
5	Denver Broncos	West	7	2	0	.778	2–1	3–1	.591	.522	W5
6 (Note: Cleveland wins tie break over Pittsburgh based on division record.)	Cleveland Browns	North	6	4	0	.600	2–1	4–3	.410	.377	W1
7	Pittsburgh Steelers	North	6	4	0	.600	2–2	3–3	.465	.417	L2
**In the hunt**
8	New England Patriots	East	5	5	0	.500	3–0	5–1	.576	.440	L2
9 (Note: Houston wins tie break over Las Vegas based on strength of victory.)	Houston Texans	South	4	6	0	.400	3–1	4–4	.480	.308	W1
10	Las Vegas Raiders	West	4	6	0	.400	1–1	3–3	.500	.179	L2
11	Baltimore Ravens	North	4	7	0	.364	0–2	2–5	.459	.286	L6
12	Indianapolis Colts	South	3	8	0	.273	1–3	2–6	.463	.293	L1
13	New York Jets	East	2	8	0	.200	0–3	2–5	.560	.350	L5
14	Los Angeles Chargers	West	1	8	0	.111	0–3	1–5	.560	.364	W1
15 (Note: Tennessee wins tie break over Miami based on strength of victory.)	Tennessee Titans	South	1	9	0	.100	1–2	1–6	.465	.273	L4
16	Miami Dolphins	East	1	9	0	.100	1–2	1–6	.622	.200	L4
