= 2026 Cincinnati Bengals season =

59th season in franchise history; 57th season in the National Football League

- Owner: Mike Brown
- General manager: Duke Tobin (de facto)
- Head coach: Zac Taylor
- Offensive coordinator: Dan Pitcher
- Defensive coordinator: Al Golden
- Home stadium: Paycor Stadium

Results
- Record: 7–2
- Division place: 1st AFC North

Uniform
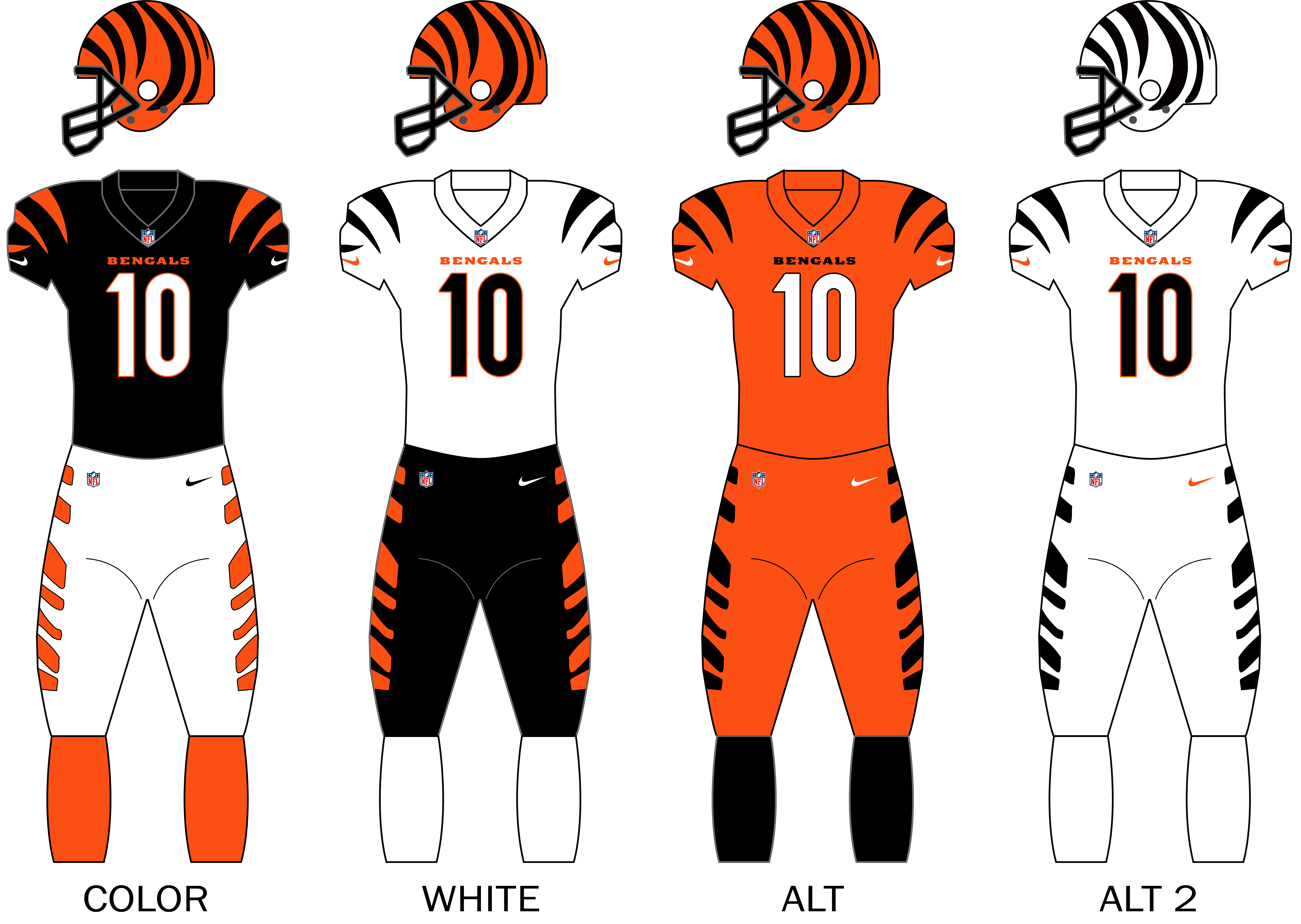

The 2026 season is the Cincinnati Bengals' 57th in the National Football League (NFL), their 59th overall, their 27th playing their home games at Paycor Stadium, and their eighth under head coach Zac Taylor. The Bengals improved their 6–11 record from the previous season following a victory over their rival Pittsburgh Steelers in Week 10. They will seek to put an end to their three-year drought of both a playoff appearance and an AFC North title. The Bengals also played in the NFL International Series for the first time since 2019.

On April 18, the Bengals traded the 10th overall pick to the New York Giants in exchange for DT Dexter Lawrence. This was the first time Cincinnati had ever traded a top-ten draft pick.

The Bengals finished the preseason undefeated for the first time since 2006. They also started 7–2, making this the first season since 2015 where the Bengals started their first nine games with more than five wins.

== Offseason ==
=== Signings ===
Position	Player	2025 Team	Date signed	Contract
CB	Jalen Davis	Cincinnati Bengals	February 20	1 year, $1.575 million
G	Dalton Risner	Cincinnati Bengals	March 2	1 year, $3.25 million
DE	Boye Mafe	Seattle Seahawks	March 12	3 years, $60 million
S	Bryan Cook	Kansas City Chiefs	March 12	3 years, $40.25 million
DT	Jonathan Allen	Minnesota Vikings	March 13	2 years, $25 million
QB	Joe Flacco	Cincinnati Bengals	March 24	1 year, $6 million
CB	Ja'Sir Taylor	New York Jets	April 2	1 year, $1.215 million
S	Kyle Dugger	Pittsburgh Steelers	April 2	1 year, $1.4025 million

=== Extensions ===
Position	Player	Date signed	Contract
OT	Orlando Brown	March 12	2 years, $32 million
DT	Dexter Lawrence	April 19	1 year, $28 million

=== Departures ===
Position	Player	2026 Team	Date signed	Contract
TE	Noah Fant	New Orleans Saints	March 11	2 years, $8.75 million
G	Cordell Volson	Tennessee Titans	March 12	1 year, $2.45 million
DE	Joseph Ossai	New York Jets	March 12	3 years, $34.5 million
DE	Trey Hendrickson	Baltimore Ravens	March 12	4 years, $112 million
QB	Jake Browning	Tampa Bay Buccaneers	March 13	1 year, $1.3325 million
CB	Marco Wilson	Miami Dolphins	March 13	1 year, $1.315 million
S	Geno Stone	Buffalo Bills	March 16	1 year, $1.4025 million
CB	Cam Taylor-Britt	Indianapolis Colts	March 17	1 year, $1.4025 million
S	Tycen Anderson	Denver Broncos	March 19	1 year, $1.5 million
G	Lucas Patrick	New York Giants	April 6	1 year, $1.4875 million
DE	Cameron Sample	San Francisco 49ers	April 13	1 year, $1.3935 million

=== Draft ===
2026 Cincinnati Bengals draft selections
Round	Selection	Player	Position	College	Notes
1	10	Traded to the New York Giants			
2	41	Cashius Howell	DE	Texas A&M	
3	72	Tacario Davis	CB	Washington	
4	110	Traded to the New York Jets			
4	128	Connor Lew	C	Auburn	From Jets
4	140	Colbie Young	WR	Georgia	From Jets via Lions
5	149	Traded to the Cleveland Browns			
6	189	Brian Parker II	C	Duke	
6	199	Traded to the New York Jets			
7	221	Jack Endries	TE	Texas	From Giants via Cowboys
7	226	Landon Robinson	DT	Navy	

Notes

- Bengals traded a fifth-round selection (149th overall) to the Cleveland Browns in exchange for a sixth-round selection (199th overall) and QB Joe Flacco.
- Bengals traded LB Logan Wilson to the Dallas Cowboys in exchange for a seventh-round pick (221st overall).
- Bengals traded the 10th overall pick to the New York Giants in exchange for DT Dexter Lawrence.
- Bengals traded the 110th and 199th overall picks to the New York Jets in exchange for the 128th and 140th overall picks.

=== Undrafted free agents ===
2026 Cincinnati Bengals draft selections
Name	Position	College	Ref.
Corey Robinson II	OT	Arkansas	
Jack Dingle	LB	Cincinnati	
Noah Thomas	WR	Georgia	
Jamal Haynes	RB	Georgia Tech	
Josh Kattus	TE	Kentucky	
Liam Brown	G	Montana	
Ceyair Wright	CB	Nebraska	
Christian Jones	OT	San Diego State	
Kentrel Bullock	RB	South Alabama	
Eric Gentry	LB	USC	
Isaiah Nwokobia	S	SMU	

== Staff ==
Cincinnati Bengals staff
Front office: Owner/president – Mike Brown; Executive vice president – Katie Blackburn; Vice president – Troy Blackburn; Vice president of player personnel – Paul H. Brown; Director of player personnel – Duke Tobin; Assistant general manager – Trey Brown; Assistant general manager – Mike Potts; Assistant general manager – Steven Radicivec; Scouting executive – Andrew Johnson; Director of football research – Sam Francis; Head coach: Head coach – Zac Taylor; Assistant head coach/special teams coordinator – Darrin Simmons; Offensive coaches: Offensive coordinator – Dan Pitcher; Passing game coordinator – Justin Rascati; Quarterbacks – Brad Kragthorpe; Assistant quarterbacks – Jordan Salkin; Running backs – Justin Hill; Wide receivers – Troy Walters; Assistant wide receivers – Davis Koetter; Tight ends/run game coordinator – James Casey; Offensive line – Scott Peters; Assistant offensive line – Michael McCarthy	Defensive coaches: Defensive coordinator – Al Golden; Defensive line/run game coordinator – Jerry Montgomery; Assistant defensive line – Mike Moon; Linebackers – Michael Hodges; Assistant linebackers – Ronnie Regula; Secondary/cornerbacks – Charles Burks; Secondary/safeties – Jordan Kovacs; Senior defensive assistant – Sean Desai; Special teams coaches: Assistant special teams – Ben Jacobs; Strength and conditioning: Strength and conditioning – Joey Boese; Assistant strength and conditioning – Todd Hunt; Assistant strength and conditioning – Garrett Swanson; Football operations: Chief of coaching staff – Doug Rosfeld; → Coaching staff → Front office → More NFL staffs

== Current roster ==
Cincinnati Bengals roster
Quarterbacks (QB): 9 Joe Burrow; 16 Joe Flacco; Running backs (RB): 25 Tahj Brooks; 30 Chase Brown; 34 Samaje Perine; Wide receivers (WR): 1 Ja'Marr Chase; 5 Tee Higgins; 81 Dohnte Meyers PR; 82 Mitchell Tinsley; 86 Colbie Young; Tight ends (TE): 84 Jack Endries; 88 Mike Gesicki; 85 Cam Grandy; 89 Drew Sample	Offensive linemen (OL): 69 Jacob Bayer C; 75 Orlando Brown T; 63 Dylan Fairchild G; 73 Javon Foster T; 77 Myles Hinton T; 64 Ted Karras C; 65 Connor Lew C; 71 Amarius Mims T; 66 Dalton Risner G; 74 Jalen Rivers G; Defensive linemen (DL): 93 Jonathan Allen DT; 92 B. J. Hill DT; 90 Kris Jenkins Jr. DT; 52 Cedric Johnson DE; 97 Dexter Lawrence DT; 53 Boye Mafe DE; 99 Myles Murphy DE; 96 Landon Robinson DT; 98 Tedarrell Slaton DT; 94 Shemar Stewart DE	Linebackers (LB): 42 Oren Burks; 49 Barrett Carter; 43 Joe Giles-Harris; 44 Demetrius Knight; 45 Jack Kiser; Defensive backs (DB): 27 Jordan Battle S; 6 Bryan Cook S; 20 Tacario Davis CB; 29 Kyle Dugger S; 23 Daxton Hill CB; 38 D. J. Ivey CB; 37 P. J. Jules S; 28 Josh Newton CB; 0 DJ Turner CB; 22 Russ Yeast S; Special teams (ST): 2 Evan McPherson K; 8 Ryan Rehkow P; 46 William Wagner LS	Practice squad: 33 Beau Brade S; 24 Trikweze Bridges CB; 31 Kentrel Bullock RB; 4 Sean Clifford QB; 95 Howard Cross III DT; 51 Isaiah Foskey DE; 50 Emany Johnson LB; 21 Bralyn Lux CB; 36 Kendall Milton RB; 14 Jordan Moore WR; 41 Caden Prieskorn TE; 56 Garmon Randolph DE; 17 Noah Thomas WR; 12 Ke'Shawn Williams WR; Reserve: 83 Erick All TE (IR); 47 Swayze Bozeman LB (IR); 35 Jalen Davis CB (IR); 55 Cashius Howell DE (IR); 87 Tanner Hudson TE (IR); 80 Andrei Iosivas WR (IR); 48 Josh Kattus TE (PS/I); 62 Brian Parker II G (IR); 26 Ja'Sir Taylor CB (IR) 52 active, 14 practice squad, 9 reserve As of November 14, 2026. Rookies in italics.; Roster; Depth chart; Transactions

== Preseason ==
Week	Date	Opponent	Result	Record	Venue	Recap
1	August 13	Detroit Lions	W 16–14	1–0	Paycor Stadium	Recap
2	August 22	Chicago Bears	W 27–9	2–0	Paycor Stadium	Recap
3	August 28	at Philadelphia Eagles	W 30–13	3–0	Lincoln Financial Field	Recap

== Regular season ==
=== Schedule ===
Week	Date	Time (ET)	Opponent	Result	Record	Venue	Network	Recap
1	September 13	1:00 p.m.	Tampa Bay Buccaneers	**W** 33–27	1–0	Paycor Stadium	Fox	Recap
2	September 20	1:00 p.m.	at Houston Texans	**W** 20–6	2–0	Reliant Stadium	CBS	Recap
3	September 27	1:00 p.m.	at **Pittsburgh Steelers**	**L** 27–30	2–1	Acrisure Stadium	CBS	Recap
4	October 4	1:00 p.m.	Jacksonville Jaguars	**L** 17–22	2–2	Paycor Stadium	CBS	Recap
5	October 11	1:00 p.m.	at Miami Dolphins	**W** 31–24	3–2	Hard Rock Stadium	Fox	Recap
6	Bye							
7	October 25	1:00 p.m.	at **Baltimore Ravens**	**W** 35–13	4–2	M&T Bank Stadium	CBS	Recap
8	November 1	1:00 p.m.	Tennessee Titans	**W** 43–36 (OT)	5–2	Paycor Stadium	CBS	Recap
9	November 8	9:30 a.m.	at Atlanta Falcons	**W** 34–17	6–2	(Spain) Bernabéu (Madrid)	NFLN	Recap
10	November 15	8:20 p.m.	**Pittsburgh Steelers**	**W** 38–18	7–2	Paycor Stadium	NBC	Recap
11	November 23	8:15 p.m.	at Washington Commanders			Northwest Stadium	ESPN	
12	November 29	1:00 p.m.	New Orleans Saints			Paycor Stadium	CBS	
13	December 6	1:00 p.m.	at **Cleveland Browns**			Huntington Bank Field	CBS	
14	December 13	4:25 p.m.	Kansas City Chiefs			Paycor Stadium	Fox	
15	December 20	1:00 p.m.	at Carolina Panthers			Bank of America Stadium	Fox	
16	December 26/27	TBD	at Indianapolis Colts			Lucas Oil Stadium	TBD	
17	December 31	8:15 p.m.	**Baltimore Ravens**			Paycor Stadium	Prime Video	
18	January 9/10	TBD	**Cleveland Browns**			Paycor Stadium	TBD	

Notes

- Intra-division opponents are in **bold** text.
- Networks, dates and times from Weeks 13–17 are subject to change as a result of flexible scheduling.
- The date, time and network for Week 16 will be finalized by no later than the end of Week 14.
- The date, time and network for Week 18 will be finalized at the end of Week 17.

=== Game summaries ===
==== Week 1: vs. Tampa Bay Buccaneers ====
Week 1: Tampa Bay Buccaneers at Cincinnati Bengals – Game summary

Quarter	1	2	3	4	Total
Buccaneers	3	7	10	7	**27**
**Bengals**	14	10	3	6	**33**

at Paycor Stadium, Cincinnati, Ohio

- Date: September 13
- Game time: 1:00 p.m. EDT
- Game weather: Sunny, 85 °F (29 °C)
- Game attendance: 66,625
- Referee: John Hussey
- TV announcers (Fox): Kevin Kugler, Daryl Johnston and Allison Williams
- Recap, Game Book

Game information

**First quarter**

- TB – Chase McLaughlin 34-yard field goal, 9:09. Buccaneers 3–0. **Drive: 11 plays, 56 yards, 5:51.**
- CIN – Demetrius Knight 27-yard fumble return, 6:18. Bengals 7–3.
- CIN – Mike Gesicki 2-yard pass from Joe Burrow (Evan McPherson kick), 1:48. Bengals 14–3. **Drive: 7 plays, 33 yards, 3:34.**

**Second quarter**

- CIN – Chase Brown 5-yard run (Evan McPherson kick), 5:32. Bengals 21–3. **Drive: 12 plays, 80 yards, 6:32.**
- TB – Bucky Irving 10-yard run (Chase McLaughlin kick), 1:49. Bengals 21–10. **Drive: 6 plays, 75 yards, 3:43.**
- CIN – Evan McPherson 20-yard field goal, 0:06. Bengals 24–10. **Drive: 10 plays, 70 yards, 1:43.**

**Third quarter**

- CIN – Evan McPherson 55-yard field goal, 10:03. Bengals 27–10. **Drive: 8 plays, 36 yards, 4:57.**
- TB – Chase McLaughlin 51-yard field goal, 3:41. Bengals 27–13. **Drive: 10 plays, 38 yards, 6:22.**
- TB – Josiah Trotter 38-yard interception return, 2:16. Bengals 27–20.

**Fourth quarter**

- CIN – Evan McPherson 58-yard field goal, 14:04. Bengals 30–20. **Drive: 8 plays, 43 yards, 3:12.**
- CIN – Evan McPherson 32-yard field goal, 5:19. Bengals 33–20. **Drive: 8 plays, 31 yards, 5:12.**
- TB – Baker Mayfield 9-yard run (Chase McLaughlin kick), 3:19. Bengals 33–27. **Drive: 7 plays, 51 yards, 2:00.**

**Top passers**

- TB – Baker Mayfield – 23/28, 216 yards
- CIN – Joe Burrow – 25/35, 254 yards, TD, INT

**Top rushers**

- TB – Bucky Irving – 8 rushes, 45 yards, TD
- CIN – Chase Brown – 16 rushes, 56 yards, TD

**Top receivers**

- TB – Emeka Egbuka – 5 receptions, 63 yards
- CIN – Mike Gesicki – 5 receptions, 78 yards, TD

The Bengals started their season at home in a game against the Buccaneers. In the first quarter, the Buccaneers were able to score first when Chase McLaughlin kicked a 34-yard field goal. Before long, the Bengals took the lead when they scored 21 unanswered points, heading into the second quarter: Demetrius Knight returning a fumble 27 yards, Joe Burrow connecting with Mike Gesicki on a 2-yard pass, and finally, Chase Brown running for 5 yards. Bucky Irving was able to get the Buccaneers closer with a 10-yard run, but the Bengals made it 24-10 at halftime when Evan McPherson kicked a 20-yard field goal. In the third quarter, the Bengals increased their lead when McPherson kicked yet another field goal from 55 yards out. The Buccaneers wrapped up the quarter, coming within 7 points, thanks to McLaughlin's 51-yard field goal and Josiah Trotter's 38-yard pick 6. In the fourth, the Bengals were able to make it a double-digit lead yet again by way of 2 more McPherson field goals: from 58 and 32 yards out. The Buccaneers shortened their deficit to 6 when Baker Mayfield ran for a touchdown from 9-yards out. However, the Bengals' defense prevented them from trying to advance any further for a comeback.

With the win, the Bengals started their season 1-0.

==== Week 2: at Houston Texans ====
Week 2: Cincinnati Bengals at Houston Texans – Game summary

Quarter	1	2	3	4	Total
**Bengals**	0	7	10	3	**20**
Texans	0	3	3	0	**6**

at Reliant Stadium, Houston, Texas

- Date: September 20
- Game time: 1:00 p.m. EDT/12:00 p.m. CDT
- Game weather: None (retractable roof closed)
- Game attendance: 70,747
- Referee: Adrian Hill
- TV announcers (CBS): Kevin Harlan, Trent Green and Melanie Collins
- Recap, Game Book

Game information

**First quarter**

- No scoring plays

**Second quarter**

- CIN – Ja'Marr Chase 32-yard pass from Joe Burrow (Evan McPherson kick), 3:29. Bengals 7–0. **Drive: 7 plays, 81 yards, 3:24.**
- HOU – Ka'imi Fairbairn 37-yard field goal, 1:17. Bengals 7–3. **Drive: 9 plays, 54 yards, 2:12.**

**Third quarter**

- CIN – Evan McPherson 51-yard field goal, 12:28. Bengals 10–3. **Drive: 4 plays, 8 yards, 2:02.**
- CIN – Ja'Marr Chase 18-yard pass from Joe Burrow (Evan McPherson kick), 3:03. Bengals 17–3. **Drive: 8 plays, 52 yards, 4:26.**
- HOU – Ka'imi Fairbairn 45-yard field goal, 0:39. Bengals 17–6. **Drive: 6 plays, 42 yards, 2:19.**

**Fourth quarter**

- CIN – Evan McPherson 57-yard field goal, 12:16. Bengals 20–6. **Drive: 7 plays, 33 yards, 3:19.**

**Top passers**

- CIN – Joe Burrow – 20/31, 207 yards, 2 TD
- HOU – C. J. Stroud – 30/55, 353 yards

**Top rushers**

- CIN – Chase Brown – 20 rushes, 80 yards
- HOU – C. J. Stroud – 3 rushes, 29 yards

**Top receivers**

- CIN – Tee Higgins – 5 receptions, 95 yards
- HOU – Dalton Schultz – 12 receptions, 140 yards

This marked the Bengals' best defensive performance in years.

==== Week 3: at Pittsburgh Steelers ====
Week 3: Cincinnati Bengals at Pittsburgh Steelers – Game summary

Quarter	1	2	3	4	Total
Bengals	7	10	3	7	**27**
**Steelers**	14	3	7	6	**30**

at Acrisure Stadium, Pittsburgh, Pennsylvania

- Date: September 27
- Game time: 1:00 p.m. EDT
- Game weather: Sunny, 70 °F (21 °C)
- Game attendance: 66,816
- Referee: Clay Martin
- TV announcers (CBS): Ian Eagle, Ross Tucker and Evan Washburn
- Recap, Game Book

Game information

**First quarter**

- PIT – Roman Wilson 38-yard pass from Aaron Rodgers (Chris Boswell kick), 13:10. Steelers 7–0. **Drive: 4 plays, 73 yards, 1:50.**
- CIN – Ja'Marr Chase 3-yard pass from Joe Burrow (Evan McPherson kick), 5:50. Tied 7–7. **Drive: 11 plays, 73 yards, 7:20.**
- PIT – Ben Skowronek 23-yard pass from Aaron Rodgers (Chris Boswell kick), 0:52. Steelers 14–7. **Drive: 11 plays, 86 yards, 4:58.**

**Second quarter**

- CIN – Evan McPherson 50-yard field goal, 10:16. Steelers 14–10. **Drive: 9 plays, 32 yards, 5:36.**
- PIT – Chris Boswell 44-yard field goal, 7:05. Steelers 17–10. **Drive: 6 plays, 40 yards, 3:11.**
- CIN – Tee Higgins 28-yard pass from Joe Burrow (Evan McPherson kick), 0:34. Tied 17–17. **Drive: 5 plays, 53 yards, 1:06.**

**Third quarter**

- CIN – Evan McPherson 38-yard field goal, 8:22. Bengals 20–17. **Drive: 12 plays, 65 yards, 6:38.**
- PIT – DK Metcalf 6-yard pass from Aaron Rodgers (Chris Boswell kick), 2:43. Steelers 24–20. **Drive: 11 plays, 74 yards, 5:39.**

**Fourth quarter**

- CIN – Mike Gesicki 25-yard pass from Joe Burrow (Evan McPherson kick), 13:29. Bengals 27–24. **Drive: 8 plays, 64 yards, 4:14.**
- PIT – Chris Boswell 36-yard field goal, 8:45. Tied 27–27. **Drive: 4 plays, −4 yards, 2:07.**
- PIT – Chris Boswell 33-yard field goal, 2:15. Steelers 30–27. **Drive: 8 plays, 77 yards, 5:24.**

**Top passers**

- CIN – Joe Burrow – 28/37, 282 yards, 3 TD
- PIT – Aaron Rodgers – 19/34, 292 yards, 3 TD, INT

**Top rushers**

- CIN – Chase Brown – 13 rushes, 61 yards
- PIT – Jaylen Warren – 17 rushes, 127 yards

**Top receivers**

- CIN – Ja'Marr Chase – 9 receptions, 98 yards, TD
- PIT – Darnell Washington – 3 receptions, 67 yards

After a big win, the Bengals went on the road for Game 1 against the Steelers. The Steelers struck first in the first quarter when Aaron Rodgers found Roman Wilson on a 38-yard touchdown pass. The Bengals then tied the game up when Joe Burrow found Ja'Marr Chase on a 3-yard touchdown pass. However, the Steelers retook the lead when Rodgers connected with Ben Skowronek on a 23-yard touchdown pass. In the second quarter, the Bengals came closer when Evan McPherson kicked a 50-yard field goal. Though, the Steelers pulled ahead by 7 again when Chris Boswell kicked a 44-yard field goal of his own. Joe Burrow then connected with Tee Higgins on a 28-yard touchdown pass, tying the game 17–17 at halftime. After the break, the Bengals moved into the lead in the third quarter when McPherson kicked a 38-yard field goal. However, the Steelers moved back into the lead with Rodgers connecting with DK Metcalf on a 6-yard touchdown pass. In the fourth quarter, the Bengals retook the lead again when Burrow found Mike Gesicki on a 25-yard touchdown pass. The Steelers moved just 11 yards on their next drive and were planning to get back on defense after a punt, but the Bengals muffed the punt, which saw Pittsburgh recover in the red zone to give them a short field that they utilized for a subsequent 36-yard field goal from Boswell. They then forced a three-and-out to get the ball back before going on a five-minute drive that culminated on a Boswell field goal from 33 yards out to give them the lead. With Cincinnati getting the ball back with two minutes left in the game, the Steelers' defense forced Joe Burrow to fumble the ball, which they recovered, sealing the win.

==== Week 4: vs. Jacksonville Jaguars ====
Week 4: Jacksonville Jaguars at Cincinnati Bengals – Game summary

Quarter	1	2	3	4	Total
**Jaguars**	3	10	3	6	**22**
Bengals	0	3	7	7	**17**

at Paycor Stadium, Cincinnati, Ohio

- Date: October 4
- Game time: 1:00 p.m. EDT
- Game weather: Sunny, 70 °F (21 °C)
- Game attendance: 66,624
- Referee: Alex Moore
- TV announcers (CBS): Tom McCarthy, Robert Turbin and Tiffany Blackmon
- Recap, Game Book

Game information

**First quarter**

- JAX – Cam Little 55-yard field goal, 2:18. Jaguars 3–0. **Drive: 9 plays, 44 yards, 5:25.**

**Second quarter**

- CIN – Evan McPherson 29-yard field goal, 10:03. Tied 3–3. **Drive: 14 plays, 67 yards, 7:15.**
- JAX – Cam Little 28-yard field goal, 4:16. Jaguars 6–3. **Drive: 12 plays, 63 yards, 5:47.**
- JAX – Brian Thomas Jr. 7-yard pass from Trevor Lawrence (Cam Little kick), 1:23. Jaguars 13–3. **Drive: 4 plays, 18 yards, 0:26.**

**Third quarter**

- CIN – Mike Gesicki 15-yard pass from Joe Burrow (Evan McPherson kick), 8:44. Jaguars 13–10. **Drive: 12 plays, 67 yards, 6:16.**
- JAX – Cam Little 54-yard field goal, 3:00. Jaguars 16–10. **Drive: 10 plays, 39 yards, 5:44.**

**Fourth quarter**

- JAX – Chris Rodriguez Jr. 25-yard run (pass failed), 6:35. Jaguars 22–10. **Drive: 7 plays, 76 yards, 3:54.**
- CIN – Joe Burrow 1-yard run (Evan McPherson kick), 3:28. Jaguars 22–17. **Drive: 9 plays, 71 yards, 3:07.**

**Top passers**

- JAX – Trevor Lawrence – 18/23, 227 yards, TD
- CIN – Joe Burrow – 39/54, 428 yards, TD, 2 INT

**Top rushers**

- JAX – Bhayshul Tuten – 17 rushes, 73 yards
- CIN – Chase Brown – 9 rushes, 10 yards

**Top receivers**

- JAX – Brenton Strange – 7 receptions, 95 yards
- CIN – Tee Higgins – 11 receptions, 157 yards

This marked the Bengals' first loss to the Jaguars since 2019. During the game, Ja'Marr Chase suffered a concussion, and Tee Higgins suffered an adductor injury.

==== Week 5: at Miami Dolphins ====
Week 5: Cincinnati Bengals at Miami Dolphins – Game summary

Quarter	1	2	3	4	Total
**Bengals**	7	14	7	3	**31**
Dolphins	7	0	3	14	**24**

at Hard Rock Stadium, Miami Gardens, Florida

- Date: October 11
- Game time: 1:00 p.m. EDT
- Game weather: Sunny, 90 °F (32 °C)
- Game attendance: 58,223
- Referee: Brad Rogers
- TV announcers (Fox): Eric Collins, Mark Schlereth and Jen Hale
- Recap, Game Book

Game information

**First quarter**

- CIN – Mike Gesicki 4-yard pass from Joe Burrow (Evan McPherson kick), 14:03. Bengals 7–0. **Drive: 3 plays, 10 yards, 0:57.**
- MIA – Ollie Gordon II 1-yard run (Riley Patterson kick), 8:02. Tied 7–7. **Drive: 11 plays, 60 yards, 6:01.**

**Second quarter**

- CIN – Samaje Perine 6-yard pass from Joe Burrow (Evan McPherson kick), 11:51. Bengals 14–7. **Drive: 13 plays, 58 yards, 7:36.**
- CIN – Tanner Hudson 2-yard pass from Joe Burrow (Evan McPherson kick), 0:55. Bengals 21–7. **Drive: 9 plays, 53 yards, 4:20.**

**Third quarter**

- MIA – Riley Patterson 29-yard field goal, 5:13. Bengals 21–10. **Drive: 11 plays, 50 yards, 5:24.**
- CIN – Ja'Marr Chase 45-yard pass from Joe Burrow (Evan McPherson kick), 0:39. Bengals 28–10. **Drive: 7 plays, 77 yards, 4:34.**

**Fourth quarter**

- MIA – Kevin Coleman Jr. 3-yard pass from Malik Willis (kick failed), 7:13. Bengals 28–18. **Drive: 14 plays, 80 yards, 8:26.**
- CIN – Evan McPherson 26-yard field goal, 2:09. Bengals 31–18. **Drive: 4 plays, 2 yards, 0:19.**
- MIA – Malik Willis 1-yard run (kick failed), 0:45. Bengals 31–24. **Drive: 8 plays, 61 yards, 1:24.**

**Top passers**

- CIN – Joe Burrow – 23/32, 190 yards, 4 TD
- MIA – Malik Willis – 15/27, 137 yards, TD, 2 INT

**Top rushers**

- CIN – Samaje Perine – 14 rushes, 68 yards
- MIA – Ollie Gordon II – 18 rushes, 88 yards, TD

**Top receivers**

- CIN – Ja'Marr Chase – 6 receptions, 77 yards, TD
- MIA – Malik Washington – 6 receptions, 43 yards

This marked Cincinnati's third straight win over Miami. Ja'Marr Chase scored a one-handed airborne touchdown just days after coming out of concussion protocol. It was an extra-special day for kicker Evan McPherson, who set a new Bengals record with 22 consecutive field goals, surpassing Shayne Graham's previous record set in 2007. This game also marked the first time the Bengals would wear orange on the road since their uniform redesign in 2021.

==== Week 7: at Baltimore Ravens ====
Week 7: Cincinnati Bengals at Baltimore Ravens – Game summary

Quarter	1	2	3	4	Total
**Bengals**	0	0	14	21	**35**
Ravens	7	6	0	0	**13**

at M&T Bank Stadium, Baltimore, Maryland

- Date: October 25
- Game time: 1:00 p.m. EDT
- Game weather: Clear, 63 °F (17 °C)
- Game attendance: 70,464
- Referee: Shawn Smith
- TV announcers (CBS): Jim Nantz, J. J. Watt, and Tracy Wolfson
- Recap, Game Book

Game information

**First quarter**

- BAL – Zay Flowers 48-yard pass from Tyler Huntley (Tyler Loop kick), 13:36. Ravens 7–0. **Drive: 4 plays, 65 yards, 1:24.**

**Second quarter**

- BAL – Tyler Loop 34-yard field goal, 9:42. Ravens 10–0. **Drive: 18 plays, 78 yards, 11:00.**
- BAL – Tyler Loop 24-yard field goal, 0:50. Ravens 13–0. **Drive: 13 plays, 82 yards, 6:09.**

**Third quarter**

- CIN – Mike Gesicki 6-yard pass from Joe Burrow (Evan McPherson kick), 9:24. Ravens 13–7. **Drive: 9 plays, 66 yards, 5:36.**
- CIN – Tee Higgins 13-yard pass from Joe Burrow (Evan McPherson kick), 4:29. Bengals 14–13. **Drive: 6 plays, 47 yards, 2:41.**

**Fourth quarter**

- CIN – Samaje Perine 1-yard run (Evan McPherson kick), 11:14. Bengals 21–13. **Drive: 6 plays, 88 yards, 3:41.**
- CIN – Ja'Marr Chase 2-yard pass from Joe Burrow (Evan McPherson kick), 7:25. Bengals 28–13. **Drive: 5 plays, 79 yards, 1:54.**
- CIN – Drew Sample 16-yard pass from Joe Burrow (Evan McPherson kick), 6:21. Bengals 35–13. **Drive: 3 plays, 24 yards, 0:55.**

**Top passers**

- CIN – Joe Burrow – 22/30, 284 yards, 4 TD
- BAL – Tyler Huntley – 23/34, 298 yards, TD, INT

**Top rushers**

- CIN – Chase Brown – 11 rushes, 39 yards
- BAL – Derrick Henry – 17 rushes, 45 yards

**Top receivers**

- CIN – Tee Higgins – 6 receptions, 148 yards, TD
- BAL – Zay Flowers – 8 receptions, 137 yards, TD

The Bengals scored 35 unanswered points in the second half and prevented the Ravens from scoring in the second half at all.

==== Week 8: vs. Tennessee Titans ====
Week 8: Tennessee Titans at Cincinnati Bengals – Game summary

Quarter	1	2	3	4	OT	Total
Titans	13	0	8	15	0	**36**
**Bengals**	0	14	9	13	7	**43**

at Paycor Stadium, Cincinnati, Ohio

- Date: November 1
- Game time: 1:00 p.m. EST
- Game weather: Cloudy, 72 °F (22 °C)
- Game attendance: 66,209
- Referee: Brad Allen
- TV announcers (CBS): Tom McCarthy, Robert Turbin, and Tiffany Blackmon
- Recap, Game Book

Game information

**First quarter**

- TEN – Joey Slye 46-yard field goal, 10:52. Titans 3–0. **Drive: 10 plays, 52 yards, 4:08.**
- TEN – Tony Pollard 40-yard run (Joey Slye kick), 7:55. Titans 10–0. **Drive: 4 plays, 67 yards, 1:38.**
- TEN – Joey Slye 29-yard field goal, 2:14. Titans 13–0. **Drive: 11 plays, 58 yards, 4:28.**

**Second quarter**

- CIN – Ja'Marr Chase 30-yard pass from Joe Burrow (Evan McPherson kick), 13:20. Titans 13–7. **Drive: 9 plays, 65 yards, 3:54.**
- CIN – Jack Endries 1-yard pass from Joe Burrow (Evan McPherson kick), 0:20. Bengals 14–13. **Drive: 9 plays, 67 yards, 1:52.**

**Third quarter**

- CIN – Tee Higgins 17-yard pass from Joe Burrow (Evan McPherson kick), 12:25. Bengals 21–13. **Drive: 1 play, 17 yards, 0:04.**
- TEN – Tony Pollard 1-yard run (Cam Ward run), 7:47. Tied 21–21. **Drive: 8 plays, 80 yards, 4:38.**
- CIN – Demetrius Knight safety, 0:46. Bengals 23–21.

**Fourth quarter**

- TEN – Chimere Dike 11-yard pass from Cam Ward (Joey Slye kick), 11:29. Titans 28–23. **Drive: 4 plays, 48 yards, 1:55.**
- CIN – Mike Gesicki 25-yard pass from Joe Burrow (pass failed), 7:13. Bengals 29–28. **Drive: 7 plays, 73 yards, 4:16.**
- TEN – Wan'Dale Robinson 15-yard pass from Cam Ward (Cam Ward–Gunnar Helm pass), 3:46. Titans 36–29. **Drive: 8 plays, 68 yards, 3:27.**
- CIN – Tee Higgins 18-yard pass from Joe Burrow (Evan McPherson kick), 1:17. Tied 36–36. **Drive: 7 plays, 81 yards, 2:29.**

**Overtime**

- CIN – Joe Burrow 9-yard run (Evan McPherson kick), 7:00. Bengals 43–36. **Drive: 5 plays, 70 yards, 3:00.**

**Top passers**

- TEN – Cam Ward – 26/40, 304 yards, 2 TD
- CIN – Joe Burrow – 38/48, 462 yards, 5 TD, 3 INT

**Top rushers**

- TEN – Tony Pollard – 21 rushes, 117 yards, 2 TD
- CIN – Chase Brown – 12 rushes, 55 yards

**Top receivers**

- TEN – Gunnar Helm – 5 receptions, 76 yards
- CIN – Tee Higgins – 10 receptions, 155 yards, 2 TD

Joe Burrow became the second quarterback in NFL history to throw for 450 passing yards and 6 touchdowns (5 passing, 1 rushing) in a single game, and the first in 75 years after Norm Van Brocklin did so for 554 yards in 1951. Burrow also became the third-fastest quarterback in NFL history to reach 175 passing yards. Ja'Marr Chase became the fourth player in the Super Bowl era to score 60 touchdowns in his first 85 games. Tight end Jack Endries also scored the first touchdown of his NFL career.

==== Week 9: at Atlanta Falcons ====
NFL Spain Games

Week 9: Cincinnati Bengals at Atlanta Falcons – Game summary

Quarter	1	2	3	4	Total
**Bengals**	7	17	7	3	**34**
Falcons	10	0	7	0	**17**

at Santiago Bernabéu Stadium, Madrid, Spain

- Date: November 8
- Game time: 3:30 p.m. CET/9:30 a.m. EST
- Game weather: None (retractable roof closed)
- Game attendance: 78,660
- Referee: Craig Wrolstad
- TV announcers (WLWT/NFLN): Bob Wischusen, Louis Riddick and Molly McGrath
- Recap, Game Book

Game information

**First quarter**

- ATL – Charlie Woerner 1-yard pass from Michael Penix Jr. (Nick Folk kick), 11:12. Falcons 7–0. **Drive: 7 plays, 80 yards, 3:48.**
- CIN – Ja'Marr Chase 47-yard pass from Joe Burrow (Evan McPherson kick), 8:49. Tied 7–7. **Drive: 5 plays, 75 yards, 2:23.**
- ATL – Nick Folk 31-yard field goal, 2:56. Falcons 10–7. **Drive: 11 plays, 47 yards, 5:53.**

**Second quarter**

- CIN – Joe Burrow 1-yard run (Evan McPherson kick), 12:56. Bengals 14–10. **Drive: 11 plays, 70 yards, 5:00.**
- CIN – Tee Higgins 4-yard pass from Joe Burrow (Evan McPherson kick), 4:03. Bengals 21–10. **Drive: 10 plays, 88 yards, 6:43.**
- CIN – Evan McPherson 57-yard field goal, 0:24. Bengals 24–10. **Drive: 5 plays, 45 yards, 0:33.**

**Third quarter**

- ATL – Bijan Robinson 1-yard run (Nick Folk kick), 6:18. Bengals 24–17. **Drive: 11 plays, 76 yards, 7:02.**
- CIN – Tee Higgins 8-yard pass from Joe Burrow (Evan McPherson kick), 2:05. Bengals 31–17. **Drive: 7 plays, 73 yards, 4:13.**

**Fourth quarter**

- CIN – Evan McPherson 43-yard field goal, 4:36. Bengals 34–17. **Drive: 7 plays, 23 yards, 3:15.**

**Top passers**

- CIN – Joe Burrow – 24/29, 271 yards, 3 TD
- ATL – Michael Penix Jr. – 20/31, 162 yards, TD, INT

**Top rushers**

- CIN – Chase Brown – 9 rushes, 57 yards
- ATL – Bijan Robinson – 19 rushes, 100 yards, TD

**Top receivers**

- CIN – Ja'Marr Chase – 10 receptions, 155 yards, TD
- ATL – Drake London – 5 receptions, 68 yards

This marked the first time in franchise history where the Bengals won four straight games by scoring at least 30 points.

==== Week 10: vs. Pittsburgh Steelers ====
Week 10: Pittsburgh Steelers at Cincinnati Bengals – Game summary

Quarter	1	2	3	4	Total
Steelers	0	3	0	15	**18**
**Bengals**	3	21	7	7	**38**

at Paycor Stadium, Cincinnati, Ohio

- Date: November 15
- Game time: 8:20 p.m. EST
- Game weather: Partly clear, 42 °F (6 °C)
- Game attendance: 66,860
- Referee: Don Willard (Note: Originally Clete Blakeman but changed due to FAA groundings.)
- TV announcers (NBC): Mike Tirico, Cris Collinsworth and Melissa Stark
- Recap, Game Book

Game information

**First quarter**

- CIN – Evan McPherson 24-yard field goal, 8:56. Bengals 3–0. **Drive: 13 plays, 80 yards, 6:04.**

**Second quarter**

- CIN – Drew Sample 3-yard pass from Joe Burrow (Evan McPherson kick), 14:47. Bengals 10–0. **Drive: 13 plays, 92 yards, 2:54.**
- CIN – Chase Brown 2-yard pass from Joe Burrow (Evan McPherson kick), 5:28. Bengals 17–0. **Drive: 5 plays, 80 yards, 8:09.**
- PIT – Chris Boswell 45-yard field goal, 1:25. Bengals 17–3. **Drive: 10 plays, 42 yards, 4:03.**
- CIN – Dohnte Meyers 15-yard pass from Joe Burrow (Evan McPherson kick), 0:09. Bengals 24–3. **Drive: 8 plays, 57 yards, 1:16.**

**Third quarter**

- CIN – Chase Brown 4-yard pass from Joe Burrow (Evan McPherson kick), 4:12. Bengals 31–3. **Drive: 11 plays, 78 yards, 6:34.**

**Fourth quarter**

- PIT – DK Metcalf 22-yard pass from Aaron Rodgers (Aaron Rodgers-DK Metcalf pass), 12:16. Bengals 31–11. **Drive: 10 plays, 84 yards, 3:05.**
- CIN – Samaje Perine 1-yard run (Evan McPherson kick), 10:08. Bengals 38–11. **Drive: 4 plays, 49 yards, 2:08.**
- PIT – Pat Freiermuth 27-yard pass from Aaron Rodgers (Chris Boswell kick), 7:19. Bengals 38–18. **Drive: 6 plays, 66 yards, 2:49.**

**Top passers**

- PIT – Aaron Rodgers – 15/29, 143 yards, 2 TD
- CIN – Joe Burrow – 35/44, 409 yards, 4 TD

**Top rushers**

- PIT – Lew Nichols III – 6 rushes, 43 yards
- CIN – Chase Brown – 10 rushes, 44 yards

**Top receivers**

- PIT – DK Metcalf – 2 receptions, 54 yards, TD
- CIN – Ja'Marr Chase – 11 receptions, 231 yards

This was Joe Burrow's fifth straight game of scoring at least 4 total touchdowns. He became the second quarterback in NFL history to meet that milestone after Peyton Manning did so with the 2004 Colts. It also marked the first time in franchise history where the Bengals won five straight games by scoring at least 30 points. Additionally, they became the first team in NFL history to return from an international game and defeat an opponent who came off their bye week. Dohnte Meyers also scored the first touchdown of his NFL career.

With the win, the Bengals took sole possession of first place in the AFC North.

==== Week 11: at Washington Commanders ====
Week 11: Cincinnati Bengals at Washington Commanders – Game summary

Quarter	1	2	3	4	Total
Bengals	0	0	0	0	**0**
Commanders	0	0	0	0	**0**

at Northwest Stadium, Landover, Maryland

- Date: November 23
- Game time: 8:15 p.m. EST
- Referee: Bill Vinovich
- TV announcers (ESPN): Joe Buck, Troy Aikman, Lisa Salters and Laura Rutledge
- Preview

=== Standings ===
==== Division ====
AFC North
	W	L	T	PCT	DIV	CONF	PF	PA	STK
Cincinnati Bengals	7	2	0	.778	2–1	5–2	278	193	W5
Pittsburgh Steelers	6	3	0	.667	2–2	3–3	198	182	L1
Cleveland Browns	6	4	0	.600	2–1	4–3	188	220	W1
Baltimore Ravens	4	6	0	.400	0–2	2–5	209	259	L5

==== Conference ====
AFC
Seed	Team	Division	W	L	T	PCT	DIV	CONF	SOS	SOV	STK
**Division leaders**
1	Buffalo Bills	East	8	1	0	.889	1–1	5–1	.460	.455	W5
2 (Note: Kansas City wins tie break over Jacksonville and Cincinnati based on conference record.) (Note: Kansas City wins tie break over Denver based on division record.)	Kansas City Chiefs	West	7	2	0	.778	3–1	6–1	.391	.309	W2
3 (Note: Jacksonville wins tie break over Cincinnati based on head-to-head victory.)	Jacksonville Jaguars	South	7	2	0	.778	2–1	6–2	.448	.412	W3
4	Cincinnati Bengals	North	7	2	0	.778	2–1	5–2	.417	.333	W5
**Wild cards**
5	Denver Broncos	West	7	2	0	.778	2–1	3–1	.583	.515	W5
6	Pittsburgh Steelers	North	6	3	0	.667	2–2	3–3	.494	.431	L1
7	Cleveland Browns	North	6	4	0	.600	2–1	4–3	.430	.393	W1
**In the hunt**
8	New England Patriots	East	5	5	0	.500	3–0	5–1	.574	.447	L2
9 (Note: Houston and Las Vegas win tie break over Baltimore based on conference record.) (Note: Houston wins tie break over Las Vegas based on strength of victory.)	Houston Texans	South	4	6	0	.400	3–1	4–4	.474	.316	W1
10	Las Vegas Raiders	West	4	6	0	.400	1–1	3–3	.500	.189	L2
11	Baltimore Ravens	North	4	6	0	.400	0–2	2–5	.453	.275	L5
12	Indianapolis Colts	South	3	8	0	.273	1–3	2–6	.471	.304	L1
13	New York Jets	East	2	8	0	.200	0–3	2–5	.553	.368	L5
14 (Note: LA Chargers and Miami win tie break over Tennessee based on conference record.) (Note: LA Chargers wins tie break over Miami based on strength of victory.)	Los Angeles Chargers	West	1	8	0	.111	0–3	1–5	.563	.400	W1
15	Miami Dolphins	East	1	8	0	.111	1–1	1–5	.581	.200	L3
16	Tennessee Titans	South	1	8	0	.111	1–2	1–6	.466	.273	L3
