= 2026 Houston Texans season =

25th season in franchise history

- Owner: Cal McNair
- General manager: Nick Caserio
- President: Mike Tomon
- Head coach: DeMeco Ryans
- Offensive coordinator: Nick Caley
- Defensive coordinator: Matt Burke
- Home stadium: Reliant Stadium

Results
- Record: 4–6
- Division place: 2nd AFC South

Uniform
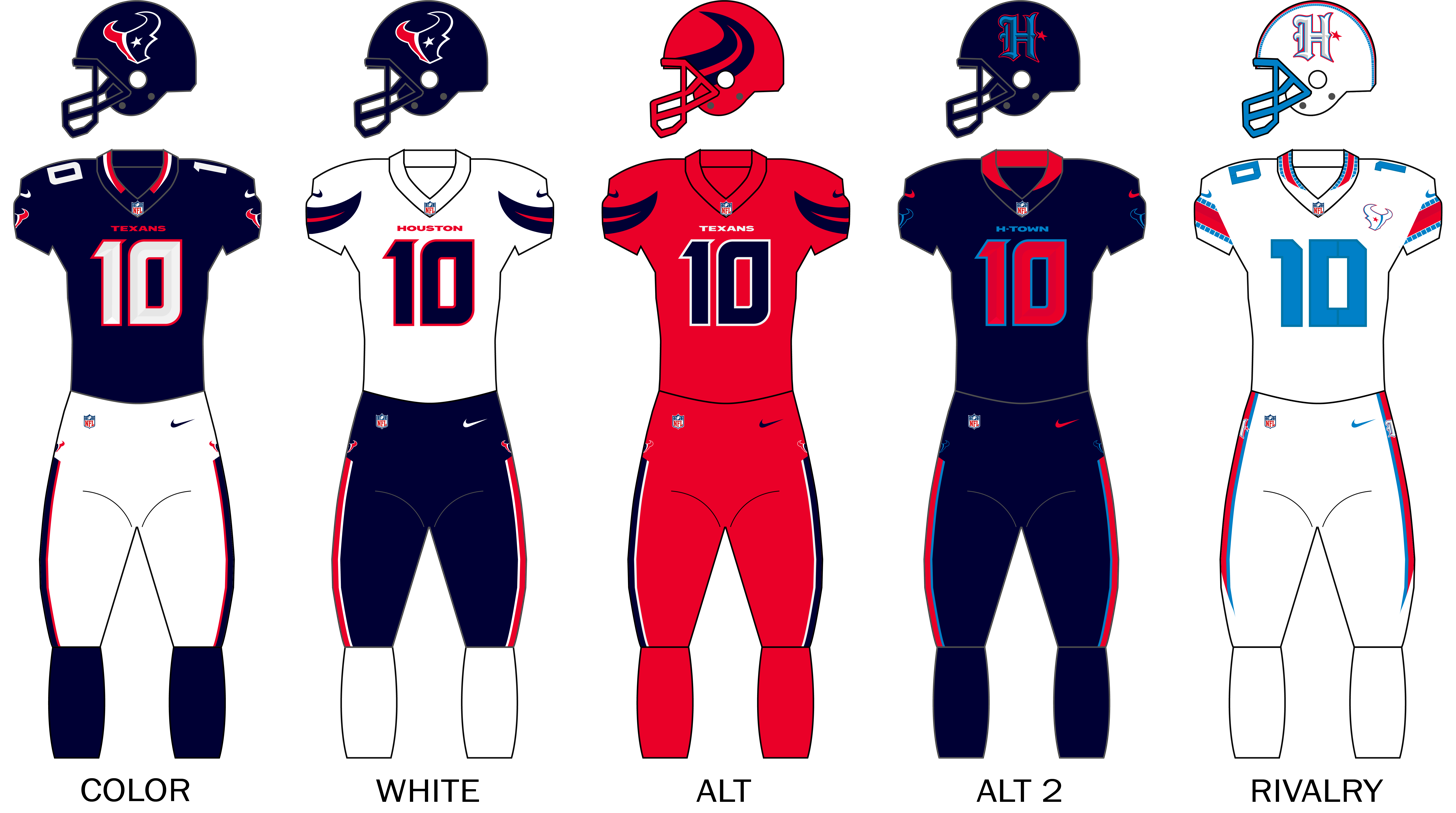

The 2026 season is the Houston Texans' 25th in the National Football League (NFL), their sixth under general manager Nick Caserio and their fourth under head coach DeMeco Ryans. The Texans failed to improve upon their 12–5 record from 2025 following a Week 7 loss to the New York Giants. They then guaranteed a worse record after a 27–24 loss to the Cleveland Browns in week 10.

The Texans matched their 0–3 start from the previous season, and had their first 0–4 start since 2020 following their week 4 loss to the Dallas Cowboys. Despite this, they would have somewhat of a turnaround afterwards, winning four of their next six games.

On March 30, 2026, the Texans revealed a logo to celebrate their 25th season, on June 8, 2026, the Texans revealed that the logo would be worn as a patch for the entire season.

== Offseason ==
=== Draft ===
2026 Houston Texans draft selections
| Round | Selection | Player | Position | College | Notes |
|---|---|---|---|---|---|
| 1 | 26 | Keylan Rutledge | OG | Georgia Tech | From Bills |
| 1 | 28 | Traded to the Buffalo Bills | | | |
| 2 | 36 | Kayden McDonald | DT | Ohio State | From Raiders |
| 2 | 38 | Traded to the Las Vegas Raiders | | | From Commanders |
| 2 | 59 | Marlin Klein | TE | Michigan | |
| 3 | 69 | Traded to the Buffalo Bills | | | From Giants |
| 3 | 90 | Traded to the Miami Dolphins | | | |
| 3 | 91 | Traded to the Las Vegas Raiders | | | From Bills |
| 4 | 106 | Febechi Nwaiwu | G | Oklahoma | From Commanders |
| 4 | 117 | Traded to the Los Angeles Chargers | | | From Vikings via Jaguars and Raiders |
| 4 | 123 | Wade Woodaz | LB | Clemson | From Chargers |
| 4 | 128 | Traded to the Detroit Lions | | | |
| 5 | 141 | Kamari Ramsey | S | USC | From Raiders via Browns |
| 5 | 167 | Traded to the Buffalo Bills | | | From Texans via Eagles |
| 6 | 198 | Traded to the Minnesota Vikings | | | From Vikings |
| 6 | 203 | Traded to the Philadelphia Eagles | | | From Eagles |
| 6 | 204 | Lewis Bond | WR | Boston College | From Chargers |
| 6 | 207 | Traded to the Los Angeles Rams | | | |
| 7 | 243 | Aiden Fisher | LB | Indiana | From 49ers |
| 7 | 244 | Traded to the Minnesota Vikings | | | |
| 7 | 245 | Traded to the Jacksonville Jaguars (Note: The Texans traded a seventh-round selection to Jacksonville in exchange for WR Christian Kirk.) | | | From Rams |

2026 Houston Texans undrafted free agents
| Name | Position | College | Ref. |
|---|---|---|---|
| Dominic Bailey | DT | Tennessee | |
| Sam Hagen | OL | South Dakota State | |
| Stephen Hall | CB | Missouri | |
| Sabastian Harsh | DE | NC State | |
| James Neal III | OL | Iowa State | |
| Joshua Pitsenberger | RB | Yale | |
| Treyvhon Saunders | WR | Colgate | |
| Daniel Sobkowicz | WR | Illinois State | |
| Jack Stonehouse | P | Syracuse | |
| Jalen Walthall | WR | Incarnate Word | |
| Noah Whittington | RB | Oregon | |
| Collin Wright | CB | Stanford | |

Draft trades

== Staff ==
Houston Texans staff
| Front office: Owner/CEO/chairman – Cal McNair; President – Mike Tomon; Executive vice president/general manager – Nick Caserio; Executive vice president/general counsel – Greg Kondritz; Assistant GM – James Liipfert; Assistant GM – Chris Blanco; Director of player personnel – D. J. Debick; Director of college scouting – Mozique McCurtis; Director of pro scouting – Steve Cargile; Senior director of football administration – Andrew Brown; Senior Director of Football Research and Game Management – Frank Edgerly; Director of college scouting operations – Tom Hayden; Senior director of football technology and innovation – Tim Brog; Senior director of research and development – Russel Joyner; Director of football analytics – Kevin Clark; Head coaches: Head coach – DeMeco Ryans; Assistant head coach/running backs – Danny Barrett; Offensive coaches: Offensive coordinator – Nick Caley; Quarterbacks – Jerry Schuplinski; Wide receivers/offensive passing game coordinator – Ben McDaniels; Assistant wide receivers – Tiquan Underwood; Tight ends – James Ferentz; Offensive line/offensive run game coordinator – Cole Popovich; Offensive assistant – Alex Ward; Offensive assistant – Cole Weeks; Offensive assistant – Asauni Rufus; Offensive assistant – Taylor Embree | Defensive coaches: Defensive coordinator – Matt Burke; Defensive passing game coordinator – Cory Undlin; Defensive line/defensive run game coordinator – Rod Wright; Assistant defensive line – Frank Okam; Linebackers – Billy Davis; Defensive backs – Dino Vasso; Safeties – Stephen Adegoke; Senior defensive assistant – Bill Lazor; Defensive assistant – Mark Sheridan; Defensive assistant – Jay Simpson; Special teams coaches: Special teams coordinator – Frank Ross; Special teams/defensive assistant – Sean Baker; Assistant special teams – Will Burnham; Coaching operations/support staff: Assistant to the head coach – Jake Olson; Applied sports science: Director of applied sports science – Marc Lewis; Applied sports science coordinator – Cole Gardner; Applied sports science apprentice – Tyler Wang; Strength and conditioning: Head strength and conditioning – Mike Eubanks; Assistant strength and conditioning – Chris Cervantes; Assistant strength and conditioning – Joe Distor; Assistant strength and conditioning – Pat Moorer; → Coaching staff → Front office → More NFL staffs |

== Current roster ==
Houston Texans roster
| Quarterbacks (QB): 10 Davis Mills; 7 C. J. Stroud; Running backs (RB): 21 Emari Demercado; 4 Woody Marks; 32 David Montgomery; Wide receivers (WR): 14 Kayshon Boutte; 12 Nico Collins; 1 Tank Dell; 18 Marvin Harrison Jr.; 19 Xavier Hutchinson; 88 Nikko Remigio PR; Tight ends (TE): 9 Brevin Jordan; 83 Marlin Klein; 87 Foster Moreau; 86 Dalton Schultz; 8 Cade Stover | Offensive linemen (OL): 60 Jake Andrews C; 63 Evan Brown C; 77 Trent Brown T; 79 Aireontae Ersery T; 57 Blake Fisher T; 69 Ed Ingram G; 64 Febechi Nwaiwu G; 66 Keylan Rutledge G; 71 Braden Smith T; 75 Wyatt Teller G; 78 Nate Thomas T; Defensive linemen (DL): 51 Will Anderson Jr. DE; 90 Jadeveon Clowney DE; 96 Logan Hall DE; 55 Danielle Hunter DE; 91 Naquan Jones DT; 93 Kayden McDonald DT; 98 Sheldon Rankins DT; 94 Dominique Robinson DE; 72 Tommy Togiai DT | Linebackers (LB): 35 Jake Hansen; 33 Jake Hummel; 39 Henry To'oTo'o; 30 Wade Woodaz; Defensive backs (DB): 6 Reed Blankenship S; 2 Calen Bullock S; 20 Ja'Marcus Ingram S; 3 Kamari Lassiter CB; 5 Jalen Pitre S; 27 Kamari Ramsey S; 22 Jaylin Smith CB; 11 Tremon Smith CB; 29 M. J. Stewart FS; 24 Derek Stingley Jr. CB; Special teams (ST): 40 Austin Brinkman LS; 15 Kaʻimi Fairbairn K; 38 Kai Kroeger P | Practice squad: 82 Lewis Bond WR; 53 Chris Braswell LB; 95 Jaden Crumedy DT; 28 Jaden Davis CB; 34 Bryce Hall CB; 54 Sabastian Harsh DE; 47 Caleb Johnson LB; 85 Josh Kelly WR; 49 Chad Muma LB; 50 Kenneth Murray LB; 70 James Neal III T; 36 George Odum S; 23 Dare Ogunbowale RB; 84 Bryce Oliver WR; 67 Max Pircher T (IPP); 31 Joshua Pitsenberger RB; 37 Collin Wright CB; Reserve: 0 Azeez Al-Shaair LB (IR); 44 British Brooks RB (IR); 50 Solomon Byrd DE (IR); 97 Mario Edwards Jr. DT (IR); 95 Ali Gaye DE (IR); 76 Sam Hagen T (IR); 81 Jayden Higgins WR (IR); 92 Dylan Horton DE (IR); 25 Jawhar Jordan RB (PS/I); -- Graham Mertz QB (IR); 13 Jaylin Noel WR (IR); 52 K. C. Ossai LB (IR); 45 E. J. Speed OLB (PUP); 26 Noah Whittington RB (PS/I) 53 active, 16 practice squad (1 IPP), 14 reserve As of November 19, 2026. Rookies in italics.; Roster; Depth chart; Transactions |

== Preseason ==
| Week | Date | Opponent | Result | Record | Venue | Recap |
|---|---|---|---|---|---|---|
| 1 | August 13 | Los Angeles Chargers | L 7–27 | 0–1 | Reliant Stadium | Recap |
| 2 | August 20 | Las Vegas Raiders | L 20–22 | 0–2 | Reliant Stadium | Recap |
| 3 | August 28 | at Carolina Panthers | L 13–16 | 0–3 | Bank of America Stadium | Recap |

== Regular season ==
=== Schedule ===
| Week | Date | Time (CT) | Opponent | Result | Record | Venue | Network | Recap |
|---|---|---|---|---|---|---|---|---|
| 1 | September 13 | 12:00 p.m. | Buffalo Bills | **L** 31–36 | 0–1 | Reliant Stadium | CBS | Recap |
| 2 | September 20 | 12:00 p.m. | Cincinnati Bengals | **L** 6–20 | 0–2 | Reliant Stadium | CBS | Recap |
| 3 | September 27 | 12:00 p.m. | at **Indianapolis Colts** | **L** 17–19 | 0–3 | Lucas Oil Stadium | CBS | Recap |
| 4 | October 4 | 12:00 p.m. | Dallas Cowboys | **L** 30–34 | 0–4 | Reliant Stadium | Fox | Recap |
| 5 | October 11 | 12:00 p.m. | at **Tennessee Titans** | **W** 26–3 | 1–4 | Nissan Stadium | CBS | Recap |
| 6 | October 18 | 8:30 a.m. | at **Jacksonville Jaguars** | **W** 34–31 | 2–4 | (United Kingdom) Wembley Stadium (London) | NFLN | Recap |
| 7 | October 25 | 12:00 p.m. | New York Giants | **L** 21–27 (OT) | 2–5 | Reliant Stadium | Fox | Recap |
| 8 | Bye | | | | | | | |
| 9 | November 8 | 3:05 p.m. | at Los Angeles Chargers | **W** 44–22 | 3–5 | SoFi Stadium | CBS | Recap |
| 10 | November 15 | 12:00 p.m. | at Cleveland Browns | **L** 24–27 | 3–6 | Huntington Bank Field | Fox | Recap |
| 11 | November 19 | 7:15 p.m. | **Indianapolis Colts** | **W** 26–3 | 4–6 | Reliant Stadium | Prime Video | Recap |
| 12 | November 29 | 12:00 p.m. | Baltimore Ravens | | | Reliant Stadium | CBS | |
| 13 | December 6 | 7:20 p.m. | at Pittsburgh Steelers | | | Acrisure Stadium | NBC | |
| 14 | December 13 | 12:00 p.m. | at Washington Commanders | | | Northwest Stadium | CBS | |
| 15 | December 20 | 12:00 p.m. | **Jacksonville Jaguars** | | | Reliant Stadium | CBS | |
| 16 | December 24 | 7:15 p.m. | at Philadelphia Eagles | | | Lincoln Financial Field | Prime Video | |
| 17 | January 4 | 7:15 p.m. | at Green Bay Packers | | | Lambeau Field | ESPN | |
| 18 | January 9/10 | TBD | **Tennessee Titans** | | | Reliant Stadium | TBD | |

Notes

- Intra-division opponents are in **bold** text.
- Networks, dates and times from Weeks 13–17 are subject to change as a result of flexible scheduling.
- The date, time and network for Week 18 will be finalized at the end of Week 17.

=== Game summaries ===
==== Week 1: vs. Buffalo Bills ====
Week 1: Buffalo Bills at Houston Texans – Game summary

| Quarter | 1 | 2 | 3 | 4 | Total |
|---|---|---|---|---|---|
| **Bills** | 3 | 21 | 3 | 9 | **36** |
| Texans | 7 | 14 | 0 | 10 | **31** |

at Reliant Stadium, Houston, Texas

- Date: September 13
- Game time: 12:00 p.m. CDT
- Game weather: None (retractable roof closed)
- Game attendance: 71,008
- Referee: Alex Moore
- TV announcers (CBS): Ian Eagle, Ross Tucker and Evan Washburn
- Recap, Game Book

Game information

**First quarter**

- BUF – Tyler Bass 46-yard field goal, 7:28. Bills 3–0. **Drive: 4 plays, 4 yards, 2:04.**
- HOU – David Montgomery 1-yard run (Ka'imi Fairbairn kick), 0:32. Texans 7–3. **Drive: 12 plays, 76 yards, 6:56.**

**Second quarter**

- BUF – Josh Allen 21-yard run (Tyler Bass kick), 12:46. Bills 10–7. **Drive: 6 plays, 62 yards, 2:46.**
- HOU – David Montgomery 18-yard run (Ka'imi Fairbairn kick), 4:48. Texans 14–10. **Drive: 13 plays, 75 yards, 7:58.**
- BUF – Josh Allen 1-yard run (Tyler Bass kick), 3:59. Bills 17–14. **Drive: 3 plays, 65 yards, 0:49.**
- BUF – D. J. Moore 43-yard pass from Josh Allen (Tyler Bass kick), 1:29. Bills 24–14. **Drive: 3 plays, 96 yards, 0:41.**
- HOU – Nico Collins 12-yard pass from C. J. Stroud (Ka'imi Fairbairn kick), 0:26. Bills 24–21. **Drive: 4 plays, 86 yards, 1:03.**

**Third quarter**

- BUF – Tyler Bass 34-yard field goal, 4:24. Bills 27–21. **Drive: 6 plays, 27 yards, 3:34.**

**Fourth quarter**

- HOU – David Montgomery 7-yard pass from C. J. Stroud (Ka'imi Fairbairn kick), 13:34. Texans 28–27. **Drive: 13 plays, 72 yards, 5:50.**
- BUF – Tyler Bass 33-yard field goal, 10:31. Bills 30–28. **Drive: 7 plays, 52 yards, 3:03.**
- HOU – Ka'imi Fairbairn 58-yard field goal, 6:44. Texans 31–30. **Drive: 7 plays, 26 yards, 3:47.**
- BUF – Josh Palmer 34-yard pass from Josh Allen (pass failed), 1:36. Bills 36–31. **Drive: 7 plays, 96 yards, 1:37.**

**Top passers**

- BUF – Josh Allen – 20/29, 334 yards, 2 TD
- HOU – C. J. Stroud – 26/38, 274 yards, 2 TD

**Top rushers**

- BUF – James Cook – 13 rushes, 57 yards
- HOU – David Montgomery – 20 rushes, 60 yards, 2 TD

**Top receivers**

- BUF – Dalton Kincaid – 5 receptions, 130 yards
- HOU – Nico Collins – 7 receptions, 75 yards, TD

With their first loss to Buffalo since 2021, the Texans started 0–1. This was also Houston's first home loss to Buffalo since 2006, snapping a five game win streak.

==== Week 2: vs. Cincinnati Bengals ====
Week 2: Cincinnati Bengals at Houston Texans – Game summary

| Quarter | 1 | 2 | 3 | 4 | Total |
|---|---|---|---|---|---|
| **Bengals** | 0 | 7 | 10 | 3 | **20** |
| Texans | 0 | 3 | 3 | 0 | **6** |

at Reliant Stadium, Houston, Texas

- Date: September 20
- Game time: 12:00 p.m. CDT
- Game weather: None (retractable roof closed)
- Game attendance: 70,747
- Referee: Adrian Hill
- TV announcers (CBS): Kevin Harlan, Trent Green and Melanie Collins
- Recap, Game Book

Game information

**First quarter**

- No scoring plays

**Second quarter**

- CIN – Ja'Marr Chase 32-yard pass from Joe Burrow (Evan McPherson kick), 3:29. Bengals 7–0. **Drive: 7 plays, 81 yards, 3:24.**
- HOU – Ka'imi Fairbairn 37-yard field goal, 1:17. Bengals 7–3. **Drive: 9 plays, 54 yards, 2:12.**

**Third quarter**

- CIN – Evan McPherson 51-yard field goal, 12:28. Bengals 10–3. **Drive: 4 plays, 8 yards, 2:02.**
- CIN – Ja'Marr Chase 18-yard pass from Joe Burrow (Evan McPherson kick), 3:03. Bengals 17–3. **Drive: 8 plays, 52 yards, 4:26.**
- HOU – Ka'imi Fairbairn 45-yard field goal, 0:39. Bengals 17–6. **Drive: 6 plays, 42 yards, 2:19.**

**Fourth quarter**

- CIN – Evan McPherson 57-yard field goal, 12:16. Bengals 20–6. **Drive: 7 plays, 33 yards, 3:19.**

**Top passers**

- CIN – Joe Burrow – 20/31, 207 yards, 2 TD
- HOU – C. J. Stroud – 30/55, 353 yards

**Top rushers**

- CIN – Chase Brown – 20 rushes, 80 yards
- HOU – C. J. Stroud – 3 rushes, 29 yards

**Top receivers**

- CIN – Tee Higgins – 5 receptions, 95 yards
- HOU – Dalton Schultz – 12 receptions, 140 yards

==== Week 3: at Indianapolis Colts ====
Week 3: Houston Texans at Indianapolis Colts – Game summary

| Quarter | 1 | 2 | 3 | 4 | Total |
|---|---|---|---|---|---|
| Texans | 0 | 7 | 0 | 10 | **17** |
| **Colts** | 3 | 10 | 0 | 6 | **19** |

at Lucas Oil Stadium, Indianapolis, Indiana

- Date: September 27
- Game time: 1:00 p.m. EDT/12:00 p.m. CDT
- Game weather: Sunny, 67 °F (19 °C) (retractable roof open)
- Game attendance: 63,400
- Referee: Ron Torbert
- TV announcers (CBS): Tom McCarthy, Robert Turbin and Tiffany Blackmon
- Recap, Game Book

Game information

**First quarter**

- IND – Spencer Shrader 39-yard field goal, 4:28. Colts 3–0. **Drive: 13 plays, 48 yards, 5:14.**

**Second quarter**

- IND – Keenan Allen 6-yard pass from Daniel Jones (Spencer Shrader kick), 11:08. Colts 10–0. **Drive: 12 plays, 69 yards, 5:31.**
- HOU – Foster Moreau 1-yard pass from C. J. Stroud (Ka'imi Fairbairn kick), 4:30. Colts 10–7. **Drive: 12 plays, 68 yards, 6:38.**
- IND – Spencer Shrader 58-yard field goal, 1:03. Colts 13–7. **Drive: 9 plays, 25 yards, 3:27.**

**Third quarter**

- No scoring plays

**Fourth quarter**

- IND – Spencer Shrader 37-yard field goal, 12:43. Colts 16–7. **Drive: 15 plays, 51 yards, 8:33.**
- HOU – Ka'imi Fairbairn 24-yard field goal, 7:33. Colts 16–10. **Drive: 10 plays, 71 yards, 5:10.**
- HOU – Woody Marks 1-yard run (Ka'imi Fairbairn kick), 1:48. Texans 17–16. **Drive: 7 plays, 54 yards, 2:52.**
- IND – Spencer Shrader 53-yard field goal, 0:16. Colts 19–17. **Drive: 6 plays, 29 yards, 1:32.**

**Top passers**

- HOU – C. J. Stroud – 16/27, 167 yards, TD
- IND – Daniel Jones – 24/36, 235 yards, TD, INT

**Top rushers**

- HOU – David Montgomery – 11 rushes, 33 yards
- IND – Jonathan Taylor – 23 rushes, 64 yards

**Top receivers**

- HOU – Xavier Hutchinson – 3 receptions, 51 yards
- IND – Josh Downs – 5 receptions, 77 yards

==== Week 4: vs. Dallas Cowboys ====
Week 4: Dallas Cowboys at Houston Texans – Game summary

| Quarter | 1 | 2 | 3 | 4 | Total |
|---|---|---|---|---|---|
| **Cowboys** | 3 | 3 | 14 | 14 | **34** |
| Texans | 10 | 6 | 7 | 7 | **30** |

at Reliant Stadium, Houston, Texas

- Date: October 4
- Game time: 12:00 p.m. CDT
- Game weather: None (retractable roof closed)
- Game attendance: 71,227
- Referee: Brad Allen
- TV announcers (Fox): Kenny Albert, Greg Olsen and Pam Oliver
- Recap, Game Book

Game information

**First quarter**

- HOU – Nico Collins 7-yard pass from C. J. Stroud (Ka'imi Fairbairn kick), 10:01. Texans 7–0. **Drive: 8 plays, 85 yards, 4:59.**
- DAL – Brandon Aubrey 39-yard field goal, 5:10. Texans 7–3. **Drive: 10 plays, 44 yards, 4:51.**
- HOU – Ka'imi Fairbairn 51-yard field goal, 1:49. Texans 10–3. **Drive: 6 plays, 59 yards, 3:21.**

**Second quarter**

- DAL – Brandon Aubrey 50-yard field goal, 12:30. Texans 10–6. **Drive: 8 plays, 36 yards, 4:19.**
- HOU – Ka'imi Fairbairn 39-yard field goal, 2:05. Texans 13–6. **Drive: 6 plays, 28 yards, 2:53.**
- HOU – Ka'imi Fairbairn 54-yard field goal, 0:00. Texans 16–6. **Drive: 4 plays, 9 yards, 0:26.**

**Third quarter**

- DAL – Javonte Williams 8-yard run (Brandon Aubrey kick), 12:55. Texans 16–13. **Drive: 4 plays, 49 yards, 2:05.**
- HOU – Nico Collins 22-yard pass from C. J. Stroud (Ka'imi Fairbairn kick), 10:50. Texans 23–13. **Drive: 4 plays, 38 yards, 2:05.**
- DAL – Javonte Williams 1-yard run (Brandon Aubrey kick), 6:49. Texans 23–20. **Drive: 7 plays, 64 yards, 4:01.**

**Fourth quarter**

- DAL – Javonte Williams 2-yard run (Brandon Aubrey kick), 11:17. Cowboys 27–23. **Drive: 14 plays, 81 yards, 8:47.**
- HOU – Woody Marks 6-yard run (Ka'imi Fairbairn kick), 2:23. Texans 30–27. **Drive: 9 plays, 87 yards, 4:32.**
- DAL – CeeDee Lamb 12-yard pass from Dak Prescott (Brandon Aubrey kick), 0:40. Cowboys 34–30. **Drive: 11 plays, 74 yards, 1:43.**

**Top passers**

- DAL – Dak Prescott – 32/45, 335 yards, TD
- HOU – C. J. Stroud – 21/31, 347 yards, 2 TD

**Top rushers**

- DAL – Javonte Williams – 19 rushes, 62 yards, 3 TD
- HOU – David Montgomery – 10 rushes, 24 yards

**Top receivers**

- DAL – CeeDee Lamb – 17 receptions, 189 yards, TD
- HOU – Nico Collins – 7 receptions, 118 yards, 2 TD

With their first loss to the Cowboys since 2022, the Texans fell to an 0–4 start for the first time since 2020. This also marked their first loss to Dallas at home since 2010.

==== Week 5: at Tennessee Titans ====
Week 5: Houston Texans at Tennessee Titans – Game summary

| Quarter | 1 | 2 | 3 | 4 | Total |
|---|---|---|---|---|---|
| **Texans** | 3 | 9 | 7 | 7 | **26** |
| Titans | 3 | 0 | 0 | 0 | **3** |

at Nissan Stadium, Nashville, Tennessee

- Date: October 11
- Game time: 12:00 p.m. CDT
- Game weather: Cloudy, 64 °F (18 °C)
- Game attendance: 52,097
- Referee: Alex Kemp
- TV announcers (CBS): Spero Dedes, Adam Archuleta and Aditi Kinkhabwala
- Recap, Game Book

Game information

**First quarter**

- TEN – Joey Slye 30-yard field goal, 10:39. Titans 3–0. **Drive: 9 plays, 58 yards, 4:21.**
- HOU – Ka'imi Fairbairn 45-yard field goal, 2:22. Tied 3–3. **Drive: 10 plays, 49 yards, 5:13.**

**Second quarter**

- HOU – Ka'imi Fairbairn 35-yard field goal, 13:33. Texans 6–3. **Drive: 6 plays, 18 yards, 3:11.**
- HOU – Ka'imi Fairbairn 26-yard field goal, 6:56. Texans 9–3. **Drive: 9 plays, 34 yards, 5:11.**
- HOU – Ka'imi Fairbairn 53-yard field goal, 1:15. Texans 12–3. **Drive: 8 plays, 34 yards, 4:29.**

**Third quarter**

- HOU – C. J. Stroud 2-yard run (Ka'imi Fairbairn kick), 6:37. Texans 19–3. **Drive: 17 plays, 74 yards, 8:23.**

**Fourth quarter**

- HOU – Jaylin Noel 9-yard pass from C. J. Stroud (Ka'imi Fairbairn kick), 14:09. Texans 26–3. **Drive: 7 plays, 74 yards, 3:01.**

**Top passers**

- HOU – C. J. Stroud – 26/34, 261 yards, TD
- TEN – Cam Ward – 23/36, 170 yards, INT

**Top rushers**

- HOU – Woody Marks – 15 rushes, 62 yards
- TEN – Tony Pollard – 14 rushes, 52 yards

**Top receivers**

- HOU – Xavier Hutchinson – 4 receptions, 65 yards
- TEN – Wan'Dale Robinson – 6 receptions, 53 yards

This marked the Texans' fourth straight win over the Titans.

==== Week 6: at Jacksonville Jaguars ====
NFL London games

Week 6: Houston Texans at Jacksonville Jaguars – Game summary

| Quarter | 1 | 2 | 3 | 4 | Total |
|---|---|---|---|---|---|
| **Texans** | 7 | 10 | 14 | 3 | **34** |
| Jaguars | 0 | 14 | 7 | 10 | **31** |

at Wembley Stadium, London, United Kingdom

- Date: October 18
- Game time: 2:30 p.m. BST/8:30 a.m. CDT
- Game weather: Rain, 58 °F (14 °C)
- Game attendance: 82,497
- Referee: Shawn Hochuli
- TV announcers (NFLN): Bob Wischusen, Louis Riddick and Molly McGrath
- Recap, Game Book

Game information

**First quarter**

- HOU – Foster Moreau 6-yard pass from C. J. Stroud (Ka'imi Fairbairn kick), 5:13. Texans 7–0. **Drive: 5 plays, 62 yards, 3:01.**

**Second quarter**

- JAX – Bhayshul Tuten 27-yard pass from Trevor Lawrence (Cam Little kick), 6:47. Tied 7–7. **Drive: 8 plays, 79 yards, 4:26.**
- HOU – Ka'imi Fairbairn 25-yard field goal, 4:16. Texans 10–7. **Drive: 7 plays, 62 yards, 2:31.**
- JAX – Bhayshul Tuten 2-yard pass from Trevor Lawrence (Cam Little kick), 0:55. Jaguars 14–10. **Drive: 9 plays, 48 yards, 3:21.**
- HOU – Foster Moreau 1-yard pass from C. J. Stroud (Ka'imi Fairbairn kick), 0:08. Texans 17–14. **Drive: 3 plays, 63 yards, 0:47.**

**Third quarter**

- HOU – Jaylin Noel 13-yard pass from C. J. Stroud (Ka'imi Fairbairn kick), 9:21. Texans 24–14. **Drive: 11 plays, 65 yards, 5:39.**
- JAX – Nate Boerkircher 1-yard pass from Trevor Lawrence (Cam Little kick), 2:34. Texans 24–21. **Drive: 6 plays, 69 yards, 2:57.**
- HOU – Jawhar Jordan 25-yard run (Ka'imi Fairbairn kick), 0:50. Texans 31–21. **Drive: 5 plays, 65 yards, 1:44.**

**Fourth quarter**

- JAX – Travis Hunter 7-yard pass from Trevor Lawrence (Cam Little kick), 11:26. Texans 31–28. **Drive: 9 plays, 61 yards, 4:24.**
- JAX – Cam Little 60-yard field goal, 1:55. Tied 31–31. **Drive: 7 plays, 38 yards, 1:58.**
- HOU – Ka'imi Fairbairn 49-yard field goal, 0:00. Texans 34–31. **Drive: 7 plays, 36 yards, 1:55.**

**Top passers**

- HOU – C. J. Stroud – 24/34, 312 yards, 3 TD, INT
- JAX – Trevor Lawrence – 24/41, 306 yards, 4 TD, INT

**Top rushers**

- HOU – Woody Marks – 15 rushes, 56 yards
- JAX – Chris Rodriguez Jr. – 11 rushes, 55 yards

**Top receivers**

- HOU – Jaylin Noel – 4 receptions, 107 yards, TD
- JAX – Jakobi Meyers – 5 receptions, 83 yards

==== Week 7: vs. New York Giants ====
Week 7: New York Giants at Houston Texans – Game summary

| Quarter | 1 | 2 | 3 | 4 | OT | Total |
|---|---|---|---|---|---|---|
| **Giants** | 7 | 7 | 0 | 7 | 6 | **27** |
| Texans | 3 | 11 | 0 | 7 | 0 | **21** |

at Reliant Stadium, Houston, Texas

- Date: October 25
- Game time: 12:00 p.m. CDT
- Game weather: None (retractable roof closed)
- Game attendance: 71,052
- Referee: Land Clark
- TV announcers (Fox): Adam Amin, Drew Brees and Kristina Pink
- Recap, Game Book

Game information

**First quarter**

- HOU – Ka'imi Fairbairn 58-yard field goal, 11:40. Texans 3–0. **Drive: 6 plays, 25 yards, 3:20.**
- NYG – Tyrone Tracy Jr. 2-yard run (Dominic Zvada kick), 6:26. Giants 7–3. **Drive: 9 plays, 66 yards, 5:14.**

**Second quarter**

- HOU – Ka'imi Fairbairn 57-yard field goal, 9:03. Giants 7–6. **Drive: 7 plays, 39 yards, 3:36.**
- NYG – Jameis Winston 1-yard run (Dominic Zvada kick), 3:32. Giants 14–6. **Drive: 9 plays, 78 yards, 5:31.**
- HOU – Marvin Harrison Jr. 6-yard pass from C. J. Stroud (C. J. Stroud–Cade Stover pass), 0:34. Tied 14–14. **Drive: 8 plays, 90 yards, 2:58.**

**Third quarter**

- No scoring plays

**Fourth quarter**

- NYG – Cam Skattebo 16-yard run (Dominic Zvada kick), 8:55. Giants 21–14. **Drive: 14 plays, 80 yards, 8:18.**
- HOU – Xavier Hutchinson 3-yard pass from C. J. Stroud (Ka'imi Fairbairn kick), 0:52. Tied 21–21. **Drive: 9 plays, 48 yards, 4:14.**

**Overtime**

- NYG – Devin Singletary 30-yard run, 7:25. Giants 27–21. **Drive: 3 plays, 81 yards, 1:29.**

**Top passers**

- NYG – J. J. McCarthy – 20/28, 252 yards
- HOU – C. J. Stroud – 17/28, 153 yards, 2 TD

**Top rushers**

- NYG – Cam Skattebo – 17 rushes, 124 yards, TD
- HOU – Woody Marks – 17 rushes, 66 yards

**Top receivers**

- NYG – Malik Nabers – 7 receptions, 111 yards
- HOU – Dalton Schultz – 5 receptions, 45 yards

==== Week 9: at Los Angeles Chargers ====
Week 9: Houston Texans at Los Angeles Chargers – Game summary

| Quarter | 1 | 2 | 3 | 4 | Total |
|---|---|---|---|---|---|
| **Texans** | 10 | 14 | 7 | 13 | **44** |
| Chargers | 3 | 6 | 0 | 13 | **22** |

at SoFi Stadium, Inglewood, California

- Date: November 8
- Game time: 3:05 p.m. CST/1:05 p.m. PST
- Game weather: Sunny, 86 °F (30 °C) (fixed roof)
- Game attendance: 67,590
- Referee: Alex Moore
- TV announcers (CBS): Spero Dedes, Adam Archuleta and Aditi Kinkhabwala
- Recap, Game Book

Game information

**First quarter**

- HOU – Xavier Hutchinson 17-yard pass from C. J. Stroud (Ka'imi Fairbairn kick), 10:16. Texans 7–0. **Drive: 8 plays, 73 yards, 4:44.**
- LAC – Cameron Dicker 52-yard field goal, 6:14. Texans 7–3. **Drive: 9 plays, 34 yards, 4:02.**
- HOU – Ka'imi Fairbairn 56-yard field goal, 3:12. Texans 10–3. **Drive: 8 plays, 26 yards, 3:02.**

**Second quarter**

- LAC – Cameron Dicker 33-yard field goal, 8:13. Texans 10–6. **Drive: 9 plays, 36 yards, 5:20.**
- LAC – Cameron Dicker 43-yard field goal, 5:11. Texans 10–9. **Drive: 6 plays, 14 yards, 2:12.**
- HOU – Tank Dell 63-yard pass from C. J. Stroud (Ka'imi Fairbairn kick), 4:28. Texans 17–9. **Drive: 2 plays, 68 yards, 0:43.**
- HOU – Kayshon Boutte 12-yard pass from C. J. Stroud (Ka'imi Fairbairn kick), 0:31. Texans 24–9. **Drive: 7 plays, 76 yards, 0:34.**

**Third quarter**

- HOU – Nico Collins 13-yard pass from C. J. Stroud (Ka'imi Fairbairn kick), 8:16. Texans 31–9. **Drive: 10 plays, 80 yards, 4:33.**

**Fourth quarter**

- HOU – Kayshon Boutte 63-yard pass from C. J. Stroud (Ka'imi Fairbairn kick), 14:12. Texans 38–9. **Drive: 5 plays, 89 yards, 2:02.**
- LAC – Quentin Johnston 58-yard pass from Justin Herbert (pass failed), 12:47. Texans 38–15. **Drive: 3 plays, 60 yards, 1:25.**
- HOU – Ka'imi Fairbairn 31-yard field goal, 8:50. Texans 41–15. **Drive: 8 plays, 62 yards, 3:57.**
- HOU – Derius Davis 15-yard pass from DJ Uiagalelei (Cameron Dicker kick), 4:19. Texans 41–22. **Drive: 10 plays, 71 yards, 4:31.**
- HOU – Ka'imi Fairbairn 41-yard field goal, 2:20. Texans 44–22. **Drive: 7 plays, 21 yards, 1:59.**

**Top passers**

- HOU – C. J. Stroud – 21/35, 384 yards, 5 TD, INT
- LAC – Justin Herbert – 13/23, 193 yards, TD, INT

**Top rushers**

- HOU – Woody Marks – 18 rushes, 70 yards
- LAC – Omarion Hampton – 13 rushes, 60 yards

**Top receivers**

- HOU – Kayshon Boutte – 4 receptions, 125 yards, 2 TD
- LAC – Quentin Johnston – 1 reception, 58 yards, TD

==== Week 10: at Cleveland Browns ====
Week 10: Houston Texans at Cleveland Browns – Game summary

| Quarter | 1 | 2 | 3 | 4 | Total |
|---|---|---|---|---|---|
| Texans | 10 | 7 | 0 | 7 | **24** |
| **Browns** | 0 | 10 | 10 | 7 | **27** |

at Huntington Bank Field, Cleveland, Ohio

- Date: November 15
- Game time: 1:00 p.m. CST/12:00 p.m. CST
- Game weather: Cloudy, 46 °F (8 °C)
- Game attendance: 58,342
- Referee: Shawn Smith
- TV announcers (Fox): Kenny Albert, Jonathan Vilma, and Megan Olivi
- Recap, Game Book

Game information

**First quarter**

- HOU – Nico Collins 12-yard pass from C. J. Stroud (Ka'imi Fairbairn kick), 9:29. Texans 7–0. **Drive: 6 plays, 61 yards, 3:53.**
- HOU – Ka'imi Fairbairn 45-yard field goal, 4:25. Texans 10–0. **Drive: 8 plays, 53 yards, 3:33.**

**Second quarter**

- HOU – Xavier Hutchinson 11-yard pass from C. J. Stroud (Ka'imi Fairbairn kick), 11:21. Texans 17–0. **Drive: 9 plays, 75 yards, 4:32.**
- CLE – Andre Szmyt 49-yard field goal, 9:02. Texans 17–3. **Drive: 7 plays, 39 yards, 2:19.**
- CLE – Deshaun Watson 6-yard run (Andre Szmyt kick), 4:12. Texans 17–10. **Drive: 2 plays, 71 yards, 0:53.**

**Third quarter**

- CLE – KC Concepcion 6-yard run (Andre Szmyt kick), 8:35. Tied 17–17. **Drive: 5 plays, 47 yards, 2:13.**
- CLE – Andre Szmyt 26-yard field goal, 0:12. Browns 20–17. **Drive: 15 plays, 74 yards, 6:07.**

**Fourth quarter**

- HOU – Dalton Schultz 11-yard pass from C. J. Stroud (Ka'imi Fairbairn kick), 9:17. Texans 24–20. **Drive: 5 plays, 56 yards, 1:45.**
- CLE – Quinshon Judkins 5-yard run (Andre Szmyt kick), 0:53. Browns 27–24. **Drive: 3 plays, 49 yards, 0:47.**

**Top passers**

- HOU – C. J. Stroud – 20/38, 211 yards, 3 TD, INT
- CLE – Deshaun Watson – 25/40, 312 yards, INT

**Top rushers**

- HOU – Woody Marks – 12 rushes, 50 yards
- CLE – Deshaun Watson – 7 rushes, 49 yards, TD

**Top receivers**

- HOU – Nico Collins – 9 receptions, 94 yards, TD
- CLE – Harold Fannin Jr. – 7 receptions, 91 yards

==== Week 11: vs. Indianapolis Colts ====
Week 11: Indianapolis Colts at Houston Texans – Game summary

| Quarter | 1 | 2 | 3 | 4 | Total |
|---|---|---|---|---|---|
| Colts | 3 | 0 | 0 | 0 | **3** |
| **Texans** | 7 | 10 | 9 | 0 | **26** |

at Reliant Stadium, Houston, Texas

- Date: November 19
- Game time: 7:15 p.m. CST
- Game weather: Mostly cloudy, 68 °F (20 °C) (retractable roof open)
- Game attendance: 70,942
- Referee: Shawn Smith
- TV announcers (Prime Video): Al Michaels, Kirk Herbstreit and Kaylee Hartung
- Recap, Game Book

Game information

**First quarter**

- IND – Spencer Shrader 34-yard field goal, 10:43. Colts 3–0. **Drive: 9 plays, 44 yards, 4:17.**
- HOU – Nico Collins 42-yard pass from C. J. Stroud (Ka'imi Fairbairn kick), 2:14. Texans 7–3. **Drive: 3 plays, 54 yards, 1:25.**

**Second quarter**

- HOU – Kayshon Boutte 24-yard pass from C. J. Stroud (Ka'imi Fairbairn kick), 7:38. Texans 14–3. **Drive: 12 plays, 85 yards, 7:14.**
- HOU – Ka'imi Fairbairn 27-yard field goal, 0:15. Texans 17–3. **Drive: 8 plays, 39 yards, 2:26.**

**Third quarter**

- HOU – Daniel Jones sacked by Will Anderson Jr. for 7-yard loss for safety, 10:22. Texans 19–3.
- HOU – Marlin Klein 13-yard pass from C. J. Stroud (Ka'imi Fairbairn kick), 4:19. Texans 26–3. **Drive: 10 plays, 57 yards, 6:03.**

**Fourth quarter**

- No scoring plays

**Top passers**

- IND – Daniel Jones – 12/27, 144 yards, INT
- HOU – C. J. Stroud – 21/27, 194 yards, 3 TD, INT

**Top rushers**

- IND – Jonathan Taylor – 11 rushes, 21 yards
- HOU – David Montgomery – 26 rushes, 107 yards

**Top receivers**

- IND – Anthony Gould – 2 receptions, 48 yards
- HOU – Nico Collins – 3 receptions, 58 yards, TD

==== Week 12: vs. Baltimore Ravens ====
Week 12: Baltimore Ravens at Houston Texans – Game summary

| Quarter | 1 | 2 | 3 | 4 | Total |
|---|---|---|---|---|---|
| Ravens | 0 | 0 | 0 | 0 | **0** |
| Texans | 0 | 0 | 0 | 0 | **0** |

at Reliant Stadium, Houston, Texas

- Date: November 29
- Game time: 12:00 p.m. CST
- Game weather: TBD (retractable roof stadium)
- TV announcers (CBS): Kevin Harlan, Trent Green and Melanie Collins
- Preview

=== Standings ===
==== Division ====
AFC South
| | W | L | T | PCT | DIV | CONF | PF | PA | STK |
|---|---|---|---|---|---|---|---|---|---|
| Jacksonville Jaguars | 7 | 2 | 0 | .778 | 2–1 | 6–2 | 269 | 144 | W3 |
| Houston Texans | 4 | 6 | 0 | .400 | 3–1 | 4–4 | 259 | 222 | W1 |
| Indianapolis Colts | 3 | 8 | 0 | .273 | 1–3 | 2–6 | 211 | 297 | L1 |
| Tennessee Titans | 1 | 8 | 0 | .111 | 1–2 | 1–6 | 167 | 239 | L3 |

==== Conference ====
AFC
| Seed | Team | Division | W | L | T | PCT | DIV | CONF | SOS | SOV | STK |
|---|---|---|---|---|---|---|---|---|---|---|---|
**Division leaders**
| 1 | Buffalo Bills | East | 8 | 1 | 0 | .889 | 1–1 | 5–1 | .460 | .455 | W5 |
| 2 (Note: Kansas City wins tie break over Jacksonville and Cincinnati based on conference record.) (Note: Kansas City wins tie break over Denver based on division record.) | Kansas City Chiefs | West | 7 | 2 | 0 | .778 | 3–1 | 6–1 | .391 | .309 | W2 |
| 3 (Note: Jacksonville wins tie break over Cincinnati based on head-to-head victory.) | Jacksonville Jaguars | South | 7 | 2 | 0 | .778 | 2–1 | 6–2 | .448 | .412 | W3 |
| 4 | Cincinnati Bengals | North | 7 | 2 | 0 | .778 | 2–1 | 5–2 | .417 | .333 | W5 |
**Wild cards**
| 5 | Denver Broncos | West | 7 | 2 | 0 | .778 | 2–1 | 3–1 | .583 | .515 | W5 |
| 6 | Pittsburgh Steelers | North | 6 | 3 | 0 | .667 | 2–2 | 3–3 | .494 | .431 | L1 |
| 7 | Cleveland Browns | North | 6 | 4 | 0 | .600 | 2–1 | 4–3 | .430 | .393 | W1 |
**In the hunt**
| 8 | New England Patriots | East | 5 | 5 | 0 | .500 | 3–0 | 5–1 | .574 | .447 | L2 |
| 9 (Note: Houston and Las Vegas win tie break over Baltimore based on conference record.) (Note: Houston wins tie break over Las Vegas based on strength of victory.) | Houston Texans | South | 4 | 6 | 0 | .400 | 3–1 | 4–4 | .474 | .316 | W1 |
| 10 | Las Vegas Raiders | West | 4 | 6 | 0 | .400 | 1–1 | 3–3 | .500 | .189 | L2 |
| 11 | Baltimore Ravens | North | 4 | 6 | 0 | .400 | 0–2 | 2–5 | .453 | .275 | L5 |
| 12 | Indianapolis Colts | South | 3 | 8 | 0 | .273 | 1–3 | 2–6 | .471 | .304 | L1 |
| 13 | New York Jets | East | 2 | 8 | 0 | .200 | 0–3 | 2–5 | .553 | .368 | L5 |
| 14 (Note: LA Chargers and Miami win tie break over Tennessee based on conference record.) (Note: LA Chargers wins tie break over Miami based on strength of victory.) | Los Angeles Chargers | West | 1 | 8 | 0 | .111 | 0–3 | 1–5 | .563 | .400 | W1 |
| 15 | Miami Dolphins | East | 1 | 8 | 0 | .111 | 1–1 | 1–5 | .581 | .200 | L3 |
| 16 | Tennessee Titans | South | 1 | 8 | 0 | .111 | 1–2 | 1–6 | .466 | .273 | L3 |
