= Bryan Thomas Jr. =

American professional football player (born 2004)

No. 57 – Jacksonville Jaguars
- Position: Defensive end
- Roster status: Active

Personal information
- Born: June 28, 2004 (age 22); Long Island, New York, U.S.
- Listed height: 6 ft 2 in (1.88 m)
- Listed weight: 235 lb (107 kg)

Career information
- High school: Foundation Academy (Winter Garden, Florida)
- College: South Carolina (2022–2025)
- NFL draft: 2026: undrafted

Career history
- Jacksonville Jaguars (2026–present)

Awards and highlights
- Third-team All-SEC (2025)
- Stats at Pro Football Reference

Bryan Tyjuan Thomas Jr. (born June 28, 2004) is an American professional football defensive end for the Jacksonville Jaguars of the National Football League (NFL). He played college football for the South Carolina Gamecocks and signed with the Jaguars as an undrafted free agent after the 2026 NFL draft.

== College career ==
Thomas Jr. played at the University of South Carolina from 2022 to 2025. He played in 46 games with 19 starts and had 92 tackles and 13.5 sacks.

== Professional career ==
Pre-draft measurables
Height	Weight	Arm length	Hand span	Wingspan	40-yard dash	10-yard split	20-yard split	20-yard shuttle	Three-cone drill	Vertical jump	Broad jump	Bench press
6 ft 1 7/8 in (1.88 m)	240 lb (109 kg)	31 3/8 in (0.80 m)	9 1/4 in (0.23 m)	6 ft 6 3/8 in (1.99 m)	4.81 s	1.60 s	2.81 s	4.46 s	7.15 s	32.5 in (0.83 m)	9 ft 8 in (2.95 m)	22 reps
All values from Pro Day

Thomas Jr. signed with the Jacksonville Jaguars after going unselected in the 2026 NFL draft. He made the initial Jaguars 53-man roster.

== Personal life ==
His father, Bryan Thomas, played 11 seasons for the New York Jets from 2002 to 2012.
