= Woody Marks =

American football player (born 2000)

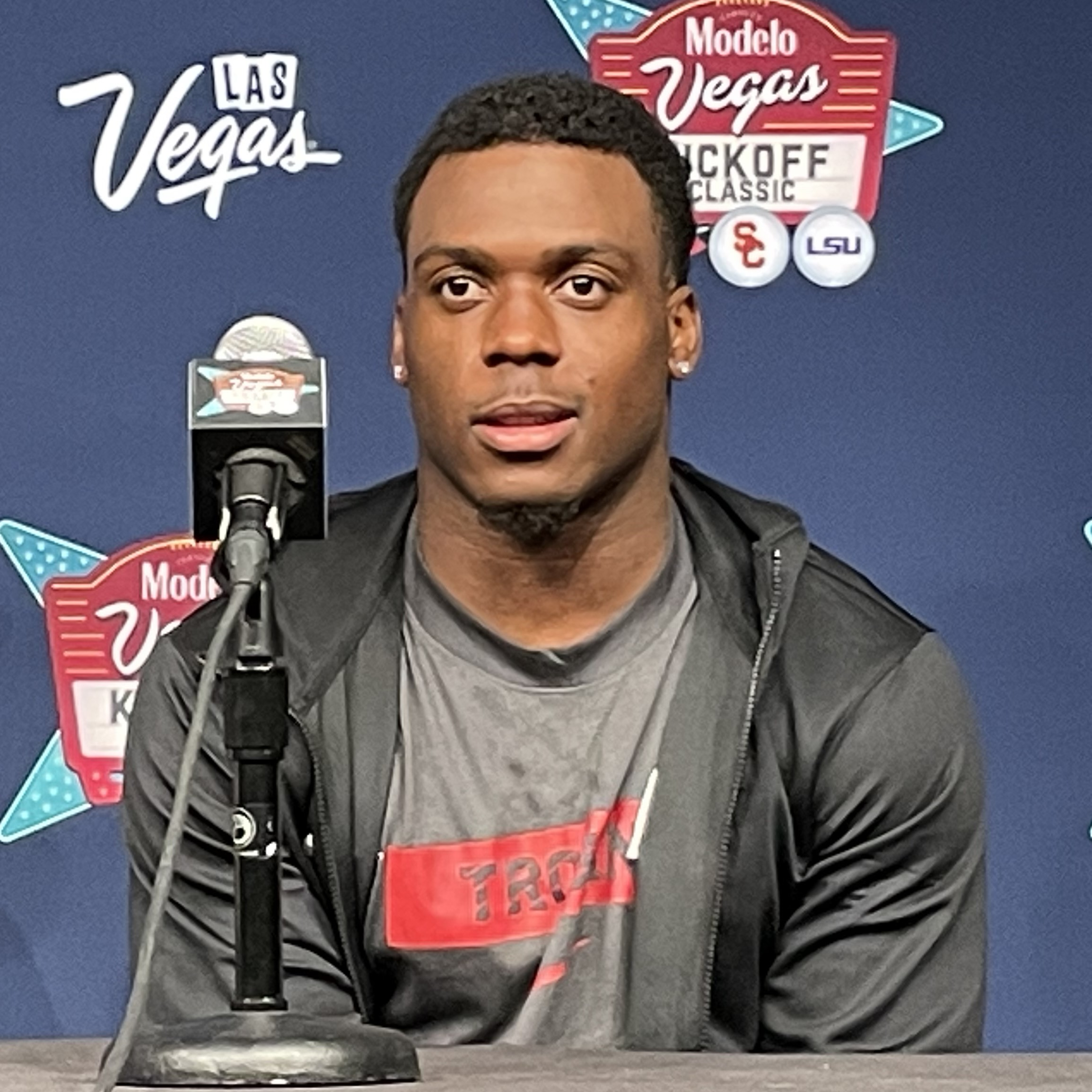
- Marks after the 2024 Vegas Kickoff Classic

No. 4 – Houston Texans
- Position: Running back
- Roster status: Active

Personal information
- Born: December 29, 2000 (age 25); Atlanta, Georgia, U.S.
- Listed height: 5 ft 10 in (1.78 m)
- Listed weight: 208 lb (94 kg)

Career information
- High school: Carver (Atlanta)
- College: Mississippi State (2020–2023); USC (2024)
- NFL draft: 2025: 4th round, 116th overall pick

Career history
- Houston Texans (2025–present)

Career NFL statistics as of Week 10, 2026
- Rushing yards: 1,094
- Rushing average: 3.6
- Rushing touchdowns: 4
- Receptions: 40
- Receiving yards: 321
- Receiving touchdowns: 3
- Stats at Pro Football Reference

Jo'Quavious Dequane "Woody" Marks (born December 29, 2000) is an American professional football running back for the Houston Texans of the National Football League (NFL). He played college football for the Mississippi State Bulldogs and USC Trojans. Marks was selected by the Texans in the fourth round of the 2025 NFL draft.

== Early life ==
Marks attended Carver High School in Atlanta, Georgia. During his career, he rushed for 6,391 yards with 59 touchdowns. He committed to Mississippi State University to play college football.

== College career ==
Marks played at Mississippi State from 2020 to 2023. As a true freshman in 2020, he started eight of 11 games and had 312 rushing yards on 70 carries with three touchdowns and 60 receptions for 268 yards. The 60 receptions were a school record for most by a freshman and most by a running back in a season. As a sophomore in 2021, Marks started eight of 13 games, recording 416 rushing yards on 106 carries with six touchdowns and 83 receptions for 502 yards and three touchdowns. Marks started seven of 12 games his junior year in 2022, rushing 113 times for 582 yards with nine touchdowns and 48 receptions for 288 yards. As a senior in 2023, Marks set the school record for career receptions. For the season he had 573 rushing yards on 121 carries with four touchdowns and 23 receptions for 167 yards and two touchdowns. After the season, Marks entered the transfer portal and transferred to the University of Southern California (USC).

== Professional career ==
Pre-draft measurables
Height	Weight	Arm length	Hand span	Wingspan	40-yard dash	10-yard split	20-yard split	20-yard shuttle	Vertical jump	Broad jump	Bench press
5 ft 10 1/8 in (1.78 m)	207 lb (94 kg)	29 1/8 in (0.74 m)	9 in (0.23 m)	5 ft 11 7/8 in (1.83 m)	4.52 s	1.50 s	2.63 s	4.24 s	35.0 in (0.89 m)	9 ft 11 in (3.02 m)	18 reps
All values from NFL Combine/Pro Day

Marks was selected by the Houston Texans in the fourth round (116th overall) of the 2025 NFL draft.

== Career statistics ==
=== NFL ===
==== Regular season ====
Year	Team	Games		Rushing					Receiving						Fumbles				
Year	Team	GP	GS	Att	Yds	Avg	Lng	TD	Tgt	Rec	Yds	Avg	Lng	TD	FF	Fmb	FR	Yds	TD
2025	HOU	16	8	196	703	3.6	23	2	36	24	208	8.7	50	3	0	1	3	1	1
2026	HOU	9	4	107	391	3.7	14	2	21	16	113	7.1	19	0	0	0	0	0	0
Career		25	12	303	1,094	3.6	23	4	57	40	321	8.0	50	3	0	1	3	1	1

==== Postseason ====
Year	Team	Games		Rushing					Receiving						Fumbles				
Year	Team	GP	GS	Att	Yds	Avg	Lng	TD	Tgt	Rec	Yds	Avg	Lng	TD	FF	Fmb	FR	Yds	TD
2025	HOU	2	2	33	129	3.9	20	1	4	2	19	9.5	13	0	0	1	0	0	0
Career		2	2	33	129	3.9	20	1	4	2	19	9.5	13	0	0	1	0	0	0

=== College ===
Season	Team	Games	Rushing				Receiving			
Season	Team	Games	Att	Yds	Avg	TD	Rec	Yds	Avg	TD
2020	Mississippi State	11	70	312	4.5	3	60	268	4.5	0
2021	Mississippi State	13	106	416	3.9	6	83	502	6.0	3
2022	Mississippi State	12	112	582	5.2	9	48	228	6.0	0
2023	Mississippi State	9	121	573	4.7	4	23	167	7.3	2
2024	USC	12	198	1,133	5.7	9	47	321	6.8	0
Career		57	608	3,016	5.0	31	261	1,546	5.9	5

== Personal life ==
Marks' nickname originates from his childhood obsession with the movie Toy Story and its protagonist, Woody the Sheriff.
