= Bhayshul Tuten =

American football player (born 2003)

No. 33 – Jacksonville Jaguars
- Positions: Running back, kick returner
- Roster status: Active

Personal information
- Born: February 14, 2003 (age 23)
- Listed height: 5 ft 9 in (1.75 m)
- Listed weight: 209 lb (95 kg)

Career information
- High school: Paulsboro (NJ)
- College: North Carolina A&T (2021–2022); Virginia Tech (2023–2024)
- NFL draft: 2025: 4th round, 104th overall pick

Career history
- Jacksonville Jaguars (2025–present)

Awards and highlights
- 2× Second-team All-ACC (2023, 2024)

Career NFL statistics as of Week 7, 2026
- Rushing yards: 695
- Rushing average: 3.9
- Rushing touchdowns: 7
- Receptions: 23
- Receiving yards: 205
- Receiving touchdowns: 4
- Stats at Pro Football Reference

Bhayshul Tuten (born February 14, 2003) is an American professional football running back and kick returner for the Jacksonville Jaguars of the National Football League (NFL). He played college football for the North Carolina A&T Aggies and Virginia Tech Hokies. Tuten was selected by the Jaguars in the fourth round of the 2025 NFL draft.

== Early life ==
Raised in Paulsboro, New Jersey, Tuten played prep football at Paulsboro High School. As a senior in 2020, he was the South Jersey Times Football Offensive player of the Year. For his high school career he had 3,768 rushing yards and 77 touchdowns. Tuten committed to North Carolina A&T State University to play college football.

== College career ==
Tuten played at North Carolina A&T in 2021 and 2022. He rushed 37 times for 215 yards with three touchdowns as a freshman. He rushed for 1,363 yards on 208 carries with 13 touchdowns as a sophomore. After the 2022 season, Tuten transferred to Virginia Tech. In his first year in 2023, he started all 13 games and rushed 173 times for 863 yards and 10 touchdowns. He returned as Virginia Tech's starting running back his senior year in 2024.

== Professional career ==
Pre-draft measurables
Height	Weight	Arm length	Hand span	Wingspan	40-yard dash	10-yard split	20-yard split	20-yard shuttle	Vertical jump	Broad jump	Bench press
5 ft 9 1/4 in (1.76 m)	206 lb (93 kg)	29 1/2 in (0.75 m)	9 in (0.23 m)	6 ft 0 7/8 in (1.85 m)	4.32 s	1.49 s	2.50 s	4.15 s	40.5 in (1.03 m)	10 ft 10 in (3.30 m)	24 reps
All values from NFL Combine/Pro Day

Tuten was selected in the fourth round (104th pick) by the Jacksonville Jaguars in the 2025 NFL draft. On December 15, 2025, Tuten was ruled out for multiple weeks after undergoing surgery to repair a finger injury suffered in Week 15 against the New York Jets.

Awards and achievements
Preceded by Darren Evans	Virginia Tech single-game rushing record 2024–present (266 yards)	Succeeded by current
