= 2026 Cleveland Browns season =

78th season in franchise history

- Owner: Jimmy Haslam
- General manager: Andrew Berry
- President: David Jenkins (de facto)
- Head coach: Todd Monken
- Offensive coordinator: Travis Switzer
- Defensive coordinator: Mike Rutenberg
- Home stadium: Huntington Bank Field

Results
- Record: 6–4
- Division place: 3rd AFC North

Uniform
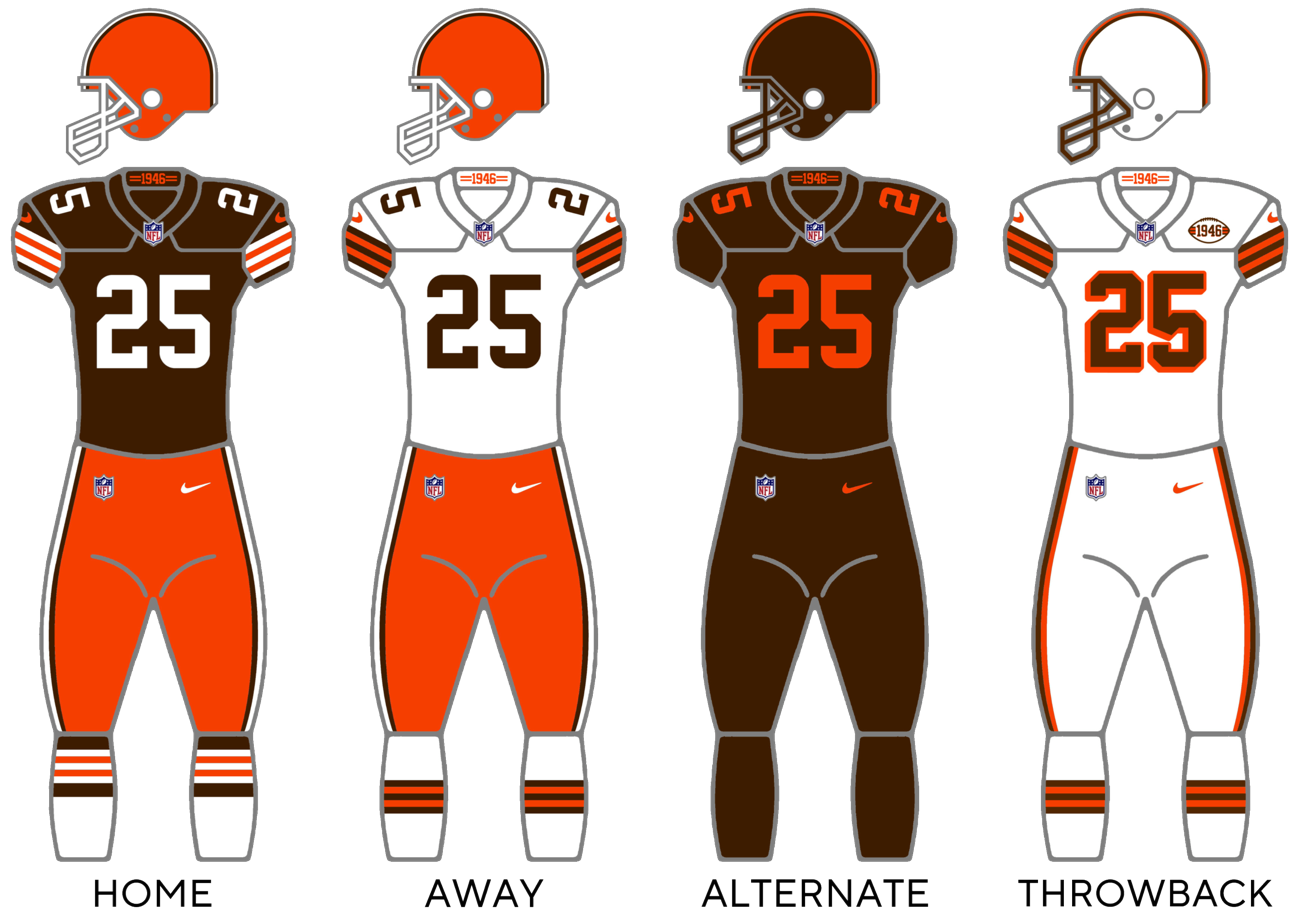

The 2026 season is the Cleveland Browns' 74th as a member of the National Football League (NFL), their 78th overall, their seventh under general manager Andrew Berry, and their first under new head coach Todd Monken. The Browns improved upon their 5–12 record from 2025. They will look to return to the playoffs after a two-year absence, and end their 33-season division title drought, having last won the then-AFC Central in 1989.

In the offseason, the Browns traded star defensive end Myles Garrett to the Los Angeles Rams on June 1 in exchange for Jared Verse along with the Rams’ 2027 first-round pick, 2028 second-round pick, and 2029 third-round pick. In nine seasons with Cleveland, Garrett received seven Pro Bowl selections, seven All-Pro selections, and two NFL Defensive Player of the Year awards, Additionally, guard Joel Bitonio retired after 12 seasons with the team.

== Offseason ==
=== Coaching changes ===
On January 5, the Browns fired head coach Kevin Stefanski. During his six-year tenure, the Browns had a 45–56 (.446) record (5–12 in 2025), with two playoff appearances. On January 28, the Browns hired former Baltimore Ravens offensive coordinator Todd Monken as head coach.

On January 22, offensive coordinator Tommy Rees accepted the same position with the Atlanta Falcons to remain on Stefanski's staff, as Atlanta had hired Stefanski on January 18. On January 30, the Browns hired former Baltimore Ravens run game coordinator Travis Switzer as offensive coordinator.

On January 29, special teams coordinator Ray Ventrone accepted the same position with the Los Angeles Rams after two seasons with the Browns. On February 10, the Browns hired former Green Bay Packers assistant special teams coordinator Byron Storer as special teams coordinator.

On February 6, defensive coordinator Jim Schwartz resigned. On February 16, the Browns hired former Atlanta Falcons defensive passing game coordinator Mike Rutenberg as defensive coordinator.

=== Roster changes ===
==== Free agency ====
2026 Cleveland Browns Free Agents
Pos	Player	Tag	2026 team	Signed
CB	Tre Avery	UFA	Cleveland Browns	March 17
LB	Jerome Baker	UFA		
G	Joel Bitonio	UFA	Retired	June 9
P	Corey Bojorquez	UFA	Cleveland Browns	March 12
LB	Devin Bush Jr.	UFA	Chicago Bears	March 11
WR	DeAndre Carter	UFA	Detroit Lions	October 15
OT	Jack Conklin	UFA		
LB	Mohamoud Diabate	RFA	Tennessee Titans	March 23
CB	Martin Emerson	UFA	New Orleans Saints	April 28
RB	Jerome Ford	UFA	Washington Commanders	March 19
DT	Shelby Harris	UFA	New York Giants	April 29
S	Ronnie Hickman	RFA	Cleveland Browns	June 11
S	Rayshawn Jenkins	UFA	Pittsburgh Steelers	August 2
DE	Sam Kamara	RFA	Cleveland Browns	March 24
CB	Anthony Kendall	ERFA	Buffalo Bills	August 12
TE	David Njoku	UFA	Los Angeles Chargers	May 10
C	Ethan Pocic	UFA	Baltimore Ravens	July 17
OT	Cam Robinson	UFA		
CB	D'Angelo Ross	UFA	Cleveland Browns	March 17
G	Wyatt Teller	UFA	Houston Texans	March 17
DE	Cameron Thomas	UFA	Atlanta Falcons	March 12
CB	Sam Webb	RFA	Denver Broncos	July 30
TE	Blake Whiteheart	RFA	Cleveland Browns	March 23
RB	Trayveon Williams	UFA	Detroit Lions	August 16

==== Signings ====
2026 Cleveland Browns Free Agents
Pos	Player	2025 team	Signed
DT	Kalia Davis	San Francisco 49ers	March 19
C	Elgton Jenkins	Green Bay Packers	March 11
G	Zion Johnson	Los Angeles Chargers	March 11
TE	Jack Stoll	New Orleans Saints	March 11
S	Daniel Thomas	Detroit Lions	March 20
WR	Tylan Wallace	Baltimore Ravens	March 18
LB	Quincy Williams	New York Jets	March 11

==== Trades ====
2026 Cleveland Browns Offseason Trades
Date	Team	Player(s)/Asset(s) Received	Player(s)/Asset(s) Traded
March 11	Houston Texans	OT Tytus Howard	2026 5th-round pick
June 1	Los Angeles Rams	DE Jared Verse, 2027 1st-round pick, 2028 2nd-round pick, 2029 3rd-round pick	DE Myles Garrett

==== Draft ====
2026 Cleveland Browns draft selections
Round	Selection	Player	Position	College	Notes
1	6	Traded to the Kansas City Chiefs			
1	9	Spencer Fano	OT	Utah	From Chiefs
1	24	KC Concepcion	WR	Texas A&M	From Jaguars
2	39	Denzel Boston	WR	Washington	
2	58	Emmanuel McNeil-Warren	S	Toledo	From 49ers
3	70	Traded to the San Francisco 49ers			
3	74	Traded to the New York Giants			From Chiefs
3	86	Austin Barber	OT	Florida	From Chargers
4	105	Traded to the Los Angeles Chargers			From Giants
4	107	Traded to the San Francisco 49ers			
5	141	Traded to the Houston Texans			From Raiders
5	145	Traded to the Los Angeles Chargers			From Giants
5	146	Parker Brailsford	C	Alabama	
5	148	Traded to the Seattle Seahawks			From Chiefs
5	149	Justin Jefferson	LB	Alabama	From Bengals
5	152	Traded to the Denver Broncos			From 49ers
5	170	Joe Royer	TE	Cincinnati	From Broncos
6	182	Taylen Green	QB	Arkansas	From Jets via Browns, Jaguars, Raiders, Bills, and Broncos
6	188	Traded to the Seattle Seahawks			
6	199	Traded to the Cincinnati Bengals			From Lions
6	206	Traded to the Los Angeles Chargers			From Bears
7	222	Traded to the Detroit Lions			
7	239	Traded to the Chicago Bears			From Eagles via Jaguars
7	242	Traded to the New York Jets			From Bills
7	248	Carsen Ryan	TE	BYU	From Seahawks

==== Undrafted free agents ====
Name	Position	College	Ref.
Davon Booth	RB	Mississippi State	
Nate Evans	CB	Delaware	
Logan Fano	DE	Utah	
Bernard Gooden	DT	LSU	
TJ Harden	RB	SMU	
Izavion Miller	OT	Auburn	
DeCarlos Nicholson	CB	USC	
Wes Pahl	P	Oklahoma State	
Tyreak Sapp	DE	Florida	
Khordae Sydnor	DE	Vanderbilt	
Zion Washington	S	Boise State	
Kole Wilson	WR	Baylor	
Michael Coats	CB	West Virginia	
Aaron Anderson	WR	LSU	
Reid Carrico	LB	West Virginia	

Draft trades

== Staff ==
Cleveland Browns staff
Ownership: Principal partners – Jimmy Haslam, Dee Haslam; Managing partner – Whitney Haslam Johnson; Partner/Executive vice president – J. W. Johnson; Limited partner – Charles Woodson; Front office: President – David Jenkins; Executive vice president of football operations/general manager – Andrew Berry; Vice president of football operations/assistant general manager – Catherine Hickman; Assistant GM/Vice president of player personnel – Glenn Cook; Senior vice president of football administration – Chris Cooper; Director of football administration – Taylor Young; Vice president, player personnel process and development – Ken Kovash; Director of player personnel – Adam Al-Khayyal; Director of college scouting – Max Paulus; Senior personnel executive – Jimmy Raye III, Chris Polian; Advisor, scouting assessment and development – Kathleen Wood; Personnel advisor – Tom Telesco; Senior football advisor – Ryan Grigson; Director of personnel operations – Megan Rock; Director of football operations & process – Joy Tapajcik; Vice President of research and strategy – Dave Giuliani; Director of scouting research – Zach Wigmore; Head coaches: Head coach – Todd Monken; Offensive coaches: Offensive coordinator – Travis Switzer; Pass game coordinator – Danny Breyer; Quarterbacks – Mike Bajakian; Assistant quarterbacks – Matt Baker; Running backs – Duce Staley; Wide receivers – Christian Jones; Assistant wide receivers – John Wozniak; Tight ends/run game coordinator – Jeff Blasko; Offensive line – George Warhop; Assistant offensive line – Bobby Johnson; Offensive assistant/offensive line – Sanders Davis; Offensive quality control – Ian Kolste; Offensive analyst – Travis Monken; Offensive analyst – Dom Borsani	Defensive coaches: Defensive coordinator – Mike Rutenberg; Defensive passing game coordinator – Ephraim Banda; Defensive line – Jacques Cesaire; Assistant defensive line – Ralph Street; Linebackers/run game coordinator – Jason Tarver; Defensive backs/pass game specialist – Brandon Lynch; Senior defensive assistant – Dom Capers; Defensive assistant/nickelbacks – Jeff Anderson; Defensive assistant/assistant linebackers – Zach Dunn; Defensive quality control – Paul Worrilow; Defensive analyst – Shaq Wilson; Special teams coaches: Special teams coordinator – Byron Storer; Assistant special teams – Keith Tandy; Strength and conditioning: Director, strength and conditioning – Larry Jackson; Player Development Coordinator – Anthony Fabiano; Assistant strength and conditioning/sports science – Josh Christovich; Assistant strength and conditioning – Monty Gibson; Assistant strength and conditioning – Dale Jones; Assistant strength and conditioning – Ty Taylor; Assistant of Performance Nutrition – Grace Kennedy; Director of performance nutrition – Kelsey Fahy; → Coaching staff → Front office → More NFL staffs

== Current roster ==
Cleveland Browns roster
Quarterbacks (QB): 6 Dillon Gabriel; 15 Taylen Green; 2 Shedeur Sanders; 4 Deshaun Watson; Running backs (RB): 10 Quinshon Judkins; 38 Jaleel McLaughlin; 22 Dylan Sampson; Wide receivers (WR): 0 Isaiah Bond; 12 Denzel Boston; 1 KC Concepcion PR; 11 Malachi Corley KR; 3 Jerry Jeudy; 16 Tylan Wallace; Tight ends (TE): 44 Harold Fannin Jr.; 86 Blake Whiteheart	Offensive linemen (OL): 58 Austin Barber T; 52 Parker Brailsford C; 55 Spencer Fano T; 71 Tytus Howard T; 74 Elgton Jenkins C; 77 Zion Johnson G; 79 Dawand Jones T; 56 Luke Wypler C; 70 Zak Zinter G; Defensive linemen (DL): 97 Derek Barnett DE; 96 Maliek Collins DT; 94 Mason Graham DT; 51 Mike Hall Jr. DT; 98 Adin Huntington DE; 92 Sam Kamara DE; 61 Jamree Kromah DE; 57 Isaiah McGuire DE; 8 Jared Verse DE; 54 Sam Williams DE	Linebackers (LB): 17 Justin Jefferson; 42 Easton Mascarenas-Arnold; 59 Winston Reid; 49 Carson Schwesinger; 5 Quincy Williams; Defensive backs (DB): 29 Mekhi Blackmon CB; 7 Tyson Campbell CB; 9 Grant Delpit S; 26 Myles Harden CB; 33 Ronnie Hickman S; 20 Noah Igbinoghene CB; 31 Donovan McMillon S; 28 Emmanuel McNeil-Warren S; 35 Toriano Pride Jr. CB; 24 Daniel Thomas S; 21 Denzel Ward CB; Special teams (ST): 13 Corey Bojorquez P; 50 Rex Sunahara LS; 25 Andre Szmyt K	Practice squad: 43 Krys Barnes LB; 64 Austin Blaske G; 39 Michael Coats Jr. CB; 68 Obinna Eze T (IPP); 99 Logan Fano DE; 88 Xavier Guillory WR; 27 Hassan Haskins RB; 19 Jimmy Horn Jr. WR; 72 KT Leveston T; 69 Zion Logue DT; 80 Zaire Mitchell-Paden TE; 36 Wes Pahl P; 48 Carsen Ryan TE; 90 Khordae Sydnor DE; 66 Xavier Truss T; 60 Nadame Tucker DE; 30 Zion Washington S; 40 Nathaniel Watson LB (PS/I); Reserve: 34 Michael Burton FB (IR); 93 Kalia Davis DT (IR); 78 Teven Jenkins G (IR); 37 Damarri Mathis CB (IR); 6 Jeremiah Owusu-Koramoah LB (PUP); 18 Joe Royer TE (NF-Ill.); 23 Raheim Sanders RB (IR); 54 Edefuan Ulofoshio MLB (IR); 91 Alex Wright DE (IR) 53 active, 16 practice squad (1 IPP), 10 reserve As of November 19, 2026. Rookies in italics.; Roster; Depth chart; Transactions

== Preseason ==
Week	Date	Opponent	Result	Record	Venue	Recap
1	August 15	at Chicago Bears	L 10–34	0–1	Soldier Field	Recap
2	August 22	Buffalo Bills	L 7–31	0–2	Huntington Bank Field	Recap
3	August 27	New England Patriots	W 37–13	1–2	Huntington Bank Field	Recap

== Regular season ==
=== Schedule ===
Week	Date	Time (ET)	Opponent	Result	Record	Venue	Network	Recap
1	September 13	1:00 p.m.	at Jacksonville Jaguars	**L** 10–34	0–1	EverBank Stadium	CBS	Recap
2	September 20	1:00 p.m.	at Tampa Bay Buccaneers	**W** 23–19	1–1	Raymond James Stadium	CBS	Recap
3	September 27	1:00 p.m.	Carolina Panthers	**W** 21–18	2–1	Huntington Bank Field	Fox	Recap
4	October 1	8:15 p.m.	**Pittsburgh Steelers**	**W** 27–24	3–1	Huntington Bank Field	Prime Video	Recap
5	October 11	1:00 p.m.	at New York Jets	**L** 12–17	3–2	MetLife Stadium	CBS	Recap
6	October 18	1:00 p.m.	**Baltimore Ravens**	**W** 13–10	4–2	Huntington Bank Field	Fox	Recap
7	October 25	1:00 p.m.	at Tennessee Titans	**W** 27–24	5–2	Nissan Stadium	CBS	Recap
8	November 1	1:00 p.m.	at **Pittsburgh Steelers**	**L** 6–27	5–3	Acrisure Stadium	CBS	Recap
9	November 8	1:00 p.m.	at New Orleans Saints	**L** 22–23 (OT)	5–4	Caesars Superdome	CBS	Recap
10	November 15	1:00 p.m.	Houston Texans	**W** 27–24	6–4	Huntington Bank Field	Fox	Recap
11	Bye							
12	November 29	8:20 p.m.	Las Vegas Raiders			Huntington Bank Field	NBC	
13	December 6	1:00 p.m.	**Cincinnati Bengals**			Huntington Bank Field	CBS	
14	December 13	1:00 p.m.	Atlanta Falcons			Huntington Bank Field	CBS	
15	December 20	1:00 p.m.	at New York Giants			MetLife Stadium	CBS	
16	December 27	1:00 p.m.	at **Baltimore Ravens**			M&T Bank Stadium	CBS	
17	January 3	1:00 p.m.	Indianapolis Colts			Huntington Bank Field	Fox	
18	January 9/10	TBD	at **Cincinnati Bengals**			Paycor Stadium	TBD	

Notes

- Intra-division opponents are in **bold** text.
- Networks, dates and times from Weeks 13–17 are subject to change as a result of flexible scheduling.
- The date, time and network for Week 18 will be finalized at the end of Week 17.

=== Game summaries ===
==== Week 1: at Jacksonville Jaguars ====
Week 1: Cleveland Browns at Jacksonville Jaguars – Game summary

Quarter	1	2	3	4	Total
Browns	0	0	3	7	**10**
**Jaguars**	14	10	10	0	**34**

at EverBank Stadium, Jacksonville, Florida

- Date: September 13
- Game time: 1:00 p.m. EDT
- Game weather: 89 °F (32 °C)
- Game attendance: 41,156
- Referee: Craig Wrolstad
- TV announcers (CBS): Tom McCarthy, Robert Turbin and Tiffany Blackmon
- Recap, Game Book

Game information

**First quarter**

- JAX – Parker Washington 30-yard pass from Trevor Lawrence (Cam Little kick), 8:11. Jaguars 7–0. **Drive: 8 plays, 59 yards, 3:55.**
- JAX – Josh Cameron 4-yard pass from Trevor Lawrence (Cam Little kick), 1:42. Jaguars 14–0. **Drive: 9 plays, 74 yards, 4:42.**

**Second quarter**

- JAX – Cam Little 47-yard field goal, 9:09. Jaguars 17–0. **Drive: 11 plays, 43 yards, 5:43.**
- JAX – Brenton Strange 14-yard pass from Trevor Lawrence (Cam Little kick), 6:18. Jaguars 24–0. **Drive: 5 plays, 44 yards, 2:09.**

**Third quarter**

- JAX – Jakobi Meyers 32-yard pass from Trevor Lawrence (Cam Little kick), 12:08. Jaguars 31–0. **Drive: 4 plays, 60 yards, 2:52.**
- CLE – Andre Szmyt 26-yard field goal, 8:31. Jaguars 31–3. **Drive: 7 plays, 15 yards, 3:37.**
- JAX – Cam Little 40-yard field goal, 1:48. Jaguars 34–3. **Drive: 10 plays, 47 yards, 6:43.**

**Fourth quarter**

- CLE – Denzel Boston 46-yard pass from Deshaun Watson (Andre Szmyt kick), 1:52. Jaguars 34–10. **Drive: 6 plays, 89 yards, 2:47.**

**Top passers**

- CLE – Deshaun Watson – 16/22, 205 yards, TD, INT
- JAX – Trevor Lawrence – 18/23, 245 yards, 4 TD

**Top rushers**

- CLE – Deshaun Watson – 6 rushes, 38 yards
- JAX – Bhayshul Tuten – 15 rushes, 66 yards

**Top receivers**

- CLE – Denzel Boston – 2 receptions, 59 yards, TD
- JAX – Parker Washington – 5 receptions, 83 yards, TD

==== Week 2: at Tampa Bay Buccaneers ====
Week 2: Cleveland Browns at Tampa Bay Buccaneers – Game summary

Quarter	1	2	3	4	Total
**Browns**	3	3	10	7	**23**
Buccaneers	6	3	7	3	**19**

at Raymond James Stadium, Tampa, Florida

- Date: September 20
- Game time: 1:00 p.m. EDT
- Game weather: Cloudy, 86 °F (30 °C)
- Game attendance: 61,391
- Referee: Brad Rogers
- TV announcers (CBS): Tom McCarthy, Robert Turbin and Tiffany Blackmon
- Recap, Game Book

Game information

**First quarter**

- TB – Chase McLaughlin 59-yard field goal, 11:10. Buccaneers 3–0. **Drive: 5 plays, 23 yards, 2:06.**
- CLE – Andre Szmyt 50-yard field goal, 7:12. Tied 3–3. **Drive: 7 plays, 40 yards, 3:58.**
- TB – Chase McLaughlin 45-yard field goal, 4:02. Buccaneers 6–3. **Drive: 6 plays, 48 yards, 3:10.**

**Second quarter**

- CLE – Andre Szmyt 34-yard field goal, 13:59. Tied 6–6. **Drive: 6 plays, 12 yards, 2:10.**
- TB – Chase McLaughlin 31-yard field goal, 0:12. Buccaneers 9–6. **Drive: 9 plays, 21 yards, 2:33.**

**Third quarter**

- TB – Emeka Egbuka 5-yard pass from Baker Mayfield (Chase McLaughlin kick), 9:33. Buccaneers 16–6. **Drive: 9 plays, 65 yards, 5:27.**
- CLE – Andre Szmyt 34-yard field goal, 3:45. Buccaneers 16–9. **Drive: 11 plays, 58 yards, 5:48.**
- CLE – Denzel Boston 55-yard pass from Deshaun Watson (Andre Szmyt kick), 1:23. Tied 16–16. **Drive: 3 plays, 83 yards, 1:06.**

**Fourth quarter**

- TB – Chase McLaughlin 31-yard field goal, 9:58. Buccaneers 19–16. **Drive: 7 plays, 71 yards, 2:53.**
- CLE – Blake Whiteheart 17-yard pass from Deshaun Watson (Andre Szmyt kick), 3:51. Browns 23–19. **Drive: 12 plays, 68 yards, 6:07.**

**Top passers**

- CLE – Deshaun Watson – 24/30, 238 yards, 2 TD
- TB – Baker Mayfield – 21/34, 182 yards, TD, INT

**Top rushers**

- CLE – Deshaun Watson – 7 rushes, 22 yards
- TB – Bucky Irving – 17 rushes, 89 yards

**Top receivers**

- CLE – Denzel Boston – 5 receptions, 95 yards, TD
- TB – Tez Johnson – 1 reception, 49 yards

The Browns erased a 10-point deficit and defeated the Buccaneers 23–19, winning their first game in Tampa since 1989. Kicker Andre Szmyt was named AFC Special Teams Player of the Week after his three-field goal performance.

==== Week 3: vs. Carolina Panthers ====
Week 3: Carolina Panthers at Cleveland Browns – Game summary

Quarter	1	2	3	4	Total
Panthers	0	3	6	9	**18**
**Browns**	0	10	0	11	**21**

at Huntington Bank Field, Cleveland, Ohio

- Date: September 27
- Game time: 1:00 p.m. EDT
- Game weather: Sunny, 68 °F (20 °C)
- Game attendance: 65,023
- Referee: Land Clark
- TV announcers (Fox): Chris Myers, Mark Schlereth and Jen Hale
- Recap, Game Book

Game information

**First quarter**

- No scoring plays

**Second quarter**

- CLE – Andre Szmyt 48-yard field goal, 5:43. Browns 3–0. **Drive: 7 plays, 18 yards, 2:50.**
- CLE – Harold Fannin Jr. 2-yard pass from Deshaun Watson (Andre Szmyt kick), 1:37. Browns 10–0. **Drive: 7 plays, 40 yards, 1:59.**
- CAR – Ryan Fitzgerald 35-yard field goal, 0:27. Browns 10–3. **Drive: 9 plays, 56 yards, 1:10.**

**Third quarter**

- CAR – Ryan Fitzgerald 41-yard field goal, 13:22. Browns 10–6. **Drive: 4 plays, 8 yards, 1:27.**
- CAR – Ryan Fitzgerald 53-yard field goal, 3:17. Browns 10–9. **Drive: 8 plays, 31 yards, 2:43.**

**Fourth quarter**

- CAR – Ryan Fitzgerald 37-yard field goal, 11:41. Panthers 12–10. **Drive: 12 plays, 68 yards, 5:29.**
- CLE – Andre Szmyt 45-yard field goal, 7:30. Browns 13–12. **Drive: 7 plays, 44 yards, 4:11.**
- CAR – John Metchie III 8-yard pass from Bryce Young (pass failed), 4:25. Panthers 18–13. **Drive: 6 plays, 72 yards, 3:05.**
- CLE – Harold Fannin Jr. 14-yard pass from Deshaun Watson (Deshaun Watson–Denzel Boston pass), 1:48. Browns 21–18. **Drive: 8 plays, 65 yards, 2:37.**

**Top passers**

- CAR – Bryce Young – 26/48, 291 yards, TD, INT
- CLE – Deshaun Watson – 16/30, 144 yards, 2 TD

**Top rushers**

- CAR – Chuba Hubbard – 19 rushes, 82 yards
- CLE – Quinshon Judkins – 18 rushes, 70 yards

**Top receivers**

- CAR – Brycen Tremayne – 4 receptions, 83 yards
- CLE – Harold Fannin Jr. – 7 receptions, 51 yards, 2 TD

==== Week 4: vs. Pittsburgh Steelers ====
Week 4: Pittsburgh Steelers at Cleveland Browns – Game summary

Quarter	1	2	3	4	Total
Steelers	7	3	0	14	**24**
**Browns**	0	21	0	6	**27**

at Huntington Bank Field, Cleveland, Ohio

- Date: October 1
- Game time: 8:15 p.m. EDT
- Game weather: Cloudy, 77 °F (25 °C)
- Game attendance: 68,156
- Referee: Clete Blakeman
- TV announcers (Prime Video): Al Michaels, Kirk Herbstreit and Kaylee Hartung
- Recap, Game Book

Game information

**First quarter**

- PIT – Roman Wilson 12-yard pass from Aaron Rodgers (Chris Boswell kick), 2:59. Steelers 7–0. **Drive: 17 plays, 78 yards, 9:48.**

**Second quarter**

- CLE – Jaleel McLaughlin 28-yard run (Andre Szmyt kick), 12:14. Tied 7–7. **Drive: 4 plays, 56 yards, 1:57.**
- CLE – Quinshon Judkins 2-yard run (Andre Szmyt kick), 8:28. Browns 14–7. **Drive: 4 plays, 74 yards, 2:10.**
- CLE – Harold Fannin Jr. 2-yard pass from Deshaun Watson (Andre Szmyt kick), 1:22. Browns 21–7. **Drive: 11 plays, 62 yards, 3:59.**
- PIT – Chris Boswell 31-yard field goal, 0:08. Browns 21–10. **Drive: 6 plays, 59 yards, 1:14.**

**Third quarter**

- No scoring plays

**Fourth quarter**

- PIT – Darnell Washington 21-yard pass from Aaron Rodgers (pass failed), 10:10. Browns 21–16. **Drive: 6 plays, 77 yards, 4:01.**
- CLE – Andre Szmyt 44-yard field goal, 6:37. Browns 24–16. **Drive: 7 plays, 40 yards, 3:33.**
- PIT – Pat Freiermuth 3-yard pass from Aaron Rodgers (Aaron Rodgers run), 1:42. Tied 24–24. **Drive: 8 plays, 80 yards, 1:50.**
- CLE – Andre Szmyt 56-yard field goal, 0:10. Browns 27–24. **Drive: 7 plays, 36 yards, 1:32.**

**Top passers**

- PIT – Aaron Rodgers – 22/40, 299 yards, 3 TD, 2 INT
- CLE – Deshaun Watson – 24/33, 268 yards, TD, INT

**Top rushers**

- PIT – Jaylen Warren – 17 rushes, 93 yards
- CLE – Quinshon Judkins – 17 rushes, 53 yards, TD

**Top receivers**

- PIT – DK Metcalf – 5 receptions, 115 yards
- CLE – Denzel Boston – 4 receptions, 89 yards

With the win, the Browns moved into sole position of first place in the AFC North for the first time since 2014.

==== Week 5: at New York Jets ====
Week 5: Cleveland Browns at New York Jets – Game summary

Quarter	1	2	3	4	Total
Browns	3	3	0	6	**12**
**Jets**	7	0	0	10	**17**

at MetLife Stadium, East Rutherford, New Jersey

- Date: October 11
- Game time: 1:00 p.m. EDT
- Game weather: Rain, 64 °F (18 °C)
- Game attendance: 67,418
- Referee: Bill Vinovich
- TV announcers (CBS): Andrew Catalon, Logan Ryan and AJ Ross
- Recap, Game Book

Game information

**First quarter**

- NYJ – Garrett Wilson 32-yard pass from Geno Smith (Jason Sanders kick), 9:17. Jets 7–0. **Drive: 8 plays, 80 yards, 3:32.**
- CLE – Andre Szmyt 25-yard field goal, 3:27. Jets 7–3. **Drive: 12 plays, 67 yards, 5:50.**

**Second quarter**

- CLE – Andre Szmyt 41-yard field goal, 10:14. Jets 7–6. **Drive: 9 plays, 31 yards, 3:10.**

**Third quarter**

- No scoring plays

**Fourth quarter**

- NYJ – Jason Sanders 54-yard field goal, 14:37. Jets 10–6. **Drive: 9 plays, 27 yards, 4:01.**
- CLE – Denzel Boston 29-yard pass from Deshaun Watson (kick failed), 6:15. Browns 12–10. **Drive: 9 plays, 86 yards, 4:23.**
- NYJ – Braelon Allen 22-yard run (Jason Sanders kick), 3:01. Jets 17–12. **Drive: 3 plays, 23 yards, 0:51.**

**Top passers**

- CLE – Deshaun Watson – 15/33, 155 yards, TD
- NYJ – Geno Smith – 17/30, 182 yards, TD

**Top rushers**

- CLE – Quinshon Judkins – 14 rushes, 44 yards
- NYJ – Braelon Allen – 24 rushes, 116 yards, TD

**Top receivers**

- CLE – Isaiah Bond – 3 receptions, 74 yards
- NYJ – Garrett Wilson – 7 receptions, 104 yards, TD

==== Week 6: vs. Baltimore Ravens ====
Week 6: Baltimore Ravens at Cleveland Browns – Game summary

Quarter	1	2	3	4	Total
Ravens	10	0	0	0	**10**
**Browns**	0	0	3	10	**13**

at Huntington Bank Field, Cleveland, Ohio

- Date: October 18
- Game time: 1:00 p.m. EDT
- Game weather: Sunny, 59 °F (15 °C)
- Game attendance: 65,872
- Referee: Carl Cheffers
- TV announcers (Fox): Kevin Kugler, Daryl Johnston and Allison Williams
- Recap, Game Book

Game information

**First quarter**

- BAL – Josh Cuevas 2-yard pass from Tyler Huntley (Tyler Loop kick), 8:11. Ravens 7–0. **Drive:11 plays, 66 yards, 6:49.**
- BAL – Tyler Loop 34-yard field goal, 4:37. Ravens 10–0. **Drive: 5 plays, 45 yards, 1:56.**

**Second quarter**

- No scoring plays

**Third quarter**

- CLE – Andre Szmyt 48-yard field goal, 7:48. Ravens 10–3. **Drive: 10 plays, 42 yards, 7:12.**

**Fourth quarter**

- CLE – Audric Estimé 2-yard run (Andre Szmyt kick), 8:33. Tied 10–10. **Drive: 7 plays, 35 yards, 4:03.**
- CLE – Andre Szmyt 37-yard field goal, 0:00. Browns 13–10. **Drive: 10 plays, 62 yards, 1:59.**

**Top passers**

- BAL – Tyler Huntley – 19/31, 165 yards, TD
- CLE – Deshaun Watson – 16/26, 164 yards

**Top rushers**

- BAL – Derrick Henry – 17 rushes, 58 yards
- CLE – Jaleel McLaughlin – 9 rushes, 41 yards

**Top receivers**

- BAL – Zay Flowers – 6 receptions, 66 yards
- CLE – Jerry Jeudy – 4 receptions, 69 yards

==== Week 7: at Tennessee Titans ====
Week 7: Cleveland Browns at Tennessee Titans – Game summary

Quarter	1	2	3	4	Total
**Browns**	7	10	0	10	**27**
Titans	14	0	0	10	**24**

at Nissan Stadium, Nashville, Tennessee

- Date: October 25
- Game time: 1:00 p.m. EDT/12:00 p.m. CDT
- Game weather: Sunny, 68 °F (20 °C)
- Game attendance: 63,710
- Referee: Scott Novak
- TV announcers (CBS): Andrew Catalon, Logan Ryan and AJ Ross
- Recap, Game Book

Game information

**First quarter**

- TEN – Tony Pollard 36-yard run (Joey Slye kick), 12:57. Titans 7–0. **Drive: 6 plays, 65 yards, 2:03.**
- TEN – Tony Pollard 10-yard run (Joey Slye kick), 8:35. Titans 14–0. **Drive: 4 plays, 24 yards, 2:06.**
- CLE – Quinshon Judkins 5-yard run (Andre Szmyt kick), 5:32. Titans 14–7. **Drive: 6 plays, 73 yards, 3:03.**

**Second quarter**

- CLE – Quinshon Judkinds 6-yard run (Andre Szmyt kick), 2:17. Tied 14–14. **Drive: 8 plays, 78 yards, 4:44.**
- CLE – Andre Szmyt 28-yard field goal, 0:00. Browns 17–14. **Drive: 10 plays, 64 yards, 1:45.**

**Third quarter**

- No scoring plays

**Fourth quarter**

- TEN – Joey Slye 29-yard field goal, 8:41. Tied 17–17. **Drive: 10 plays, 56 yards, 5:23.**
- CLE – Deshaun Watson 9-yard run (Andre Szmyt kick), 4:34. Browns 24–17. **Drive: 8 plays, 71 yards, 4:07.**
- TEN – Tony Pollard 1-yard run (Joey Slye kick), 0:58. Tied 24–24. **Drive: 11 plays, 63 yards, 3:36.**
- CLE – Andre Szmyt 32-yard field goal, 0:00. Browns 27–24. **Drive: 4 plays, 55 yards, 0:58.**

**Top passers**

- CLE – Deshaun Watson – 25/36, 308 yards, INT
- TEN – Cam Ward – 20/31, 181 yards, INT

**Top rushers**

- CLE – Quinshon Judkins – 17 rushes, 96 yards, 2 TD
- TEN – Tony Pollard – 25 rushes, 129 yards, 3 TD

**Top receivers**

- CLE – KC Concepcion – 8 receptions, 129 yards
- TEN – Carnell Tate – 5 receptions, 69 yards

==== Week 8: at Pittsburgh Steelers ====
Week 8: Cleveland Browns at Pittsburgh Steelers – Game summary

Quarter	1	2	3	4	Total
Browns	0	6	0	0	**6**
**Steelers**	7	13	7	0	**27**

at Acrisure Stadium, Pittsburgh, Pennsylvania

- Date: November 1
- Game time: 1:00 p.m. EST
- Game weather: Cloudy, 66 °F (19 °C)
- Game attendance: 66,986
- Referee: Alex Kemp
- TV announcers (CBS): Kevin Harlan, Trent Green and Melanie Collins
- Recap, Game Book

Game information

**First quarter**

- PIT – Rico Dowdle 9-yard run (Chris Boswell kick), 7:57. Steelers 7–0. **Drive: 5 plays, 45 yards, 2:37.**

**Second quarter**

- PIT – Chris Boswell 20-yard field goal, 14:05. Steelers 10–0. **Drive: 13 plays, 86 yards, 7:12.**
- CLE – Andre Szmyt 32-yard field goal, 8:43. Steelers 10–3. **Drive: 10 plays, 61 yards, 5:22.**
- PIT – Chris Boswell 37-yard field goal, 3:27. Steelers 13–3. **Drive: 10 plays, 45 yards, 5:16.**
- CLE – Andre Szmyt 49-yard field goal, 0:45. Steelers 13–6. **Drive: 8 plays, 44 yards, 2:42.**
- PIT – Pat Freiermuth 1-yard run (Chris Boswell kick), 0:01. Steelers 20–6. **Drive: 6 plays, 69 yards, 0:44.**

**Third quarter**

- PIT – Jaylen Warren 1-yard run (Chris Boswell kick), 9:39. Steelers 27–6. **Drive: 2 plays, 59 yards, 0:44.**

**Fourth quarter**

- No scoring plays

**Top passers**

- CLE – Deshaun Watson – 27/39, 324 yards
- PIT – Aaron Rodgers – 13/25, 172 yards, INT

**Top rushers**

- CLE – Quinshon Judkins – 11 rushes, 25 yards
- PIT – Jaylen Warren – 17 rushes, 143 yards, TD

**Top receivers**

- CLE – Harold Fannin Jr. – 10 receptions, 154 yards
- PIT – Darnell Washington – 3 receptions, 94 yards

==== Week 9: at New Orleans Saints ====
Week 9: Cleveland Browns at New Orleans Saints – Game summary

Quarter	1	2	3	4	OT	Total
Browns	0	3	3	10	6	**22**
**Saints**	3	0	3	10	7	**23**

at Caesars Superdome, New Orleans, Louisiana

- Date: November 8
- Game time: 1:00 p.m. EST/12:00 p.m. CST
- Game weather: None (indoor stadium)
- Game attendance: 70,182
- Referee: Shawn Hochuli
- TV announcers (CBS): Andrew Catalon, Logan Ryan and AJ Ross
- Recap, Game Book

Game information

**First quarter**

- NO – Charlie Smyth 30-yard field goal, 7:20. Saints 3–0. **Drive: 8 plays, 51 yards, 5:08.**

**Second quarter**

- CLE – Andre Szmyt 41-yard field goal, 10:30. Tied 3–3. **Drive: 9 plays, 35 yards, 4:38.**

**Third quarter**

- CLE – Andre Szmyt 30-yard field goal, 9:01. Browns 6–3. **Drive: 8 plays, 66 yards, 4:22.**
- NO – Charlie Smyth 27-yard field goal, 2:26. Tied 6–6. **Drive: 13 plays, 54 yards, 6:35.**

**Fourth quarter**

- CLE – KC Concepcion 64-yard pass from Shedeur Sanders (Andre Szmyt kick), 5:21. Browns 13–9. **Drive: 1 plays, 64 yards, 0:17.**
- NO – Audric Estimé 2-yard run (Charlie Smyth kick), 0:58. Saints 16–13. **Drive: 6 plays, 55 yards, 0:50.**
- NO – Charlie Smyth 30-yard field goal, 7:20. Saints 3–0. **Drive: 6 plays, 55 yards, 0:50.**
- CLE – Andre Szmyt 51-yard field goal, 0:08. Tied 16–16. **Drive: 7 plays, 41 yards, 0:50.**

**Overtime**

- NO – Juwan Johnson 15-yard pass from Tyler Shough (Charlie Smyth kick), 4:17. Saints 23–16. **Drive: 11 plays, 74 yards, 5:43.**
- CLE – Harold Fannin Jr. 39-yard pass from Shedeur Sanders (pass failed), 1:00. Saints 23–22. **Drive: 8 plays, 67 yards, 3:17.**

**Top passers**

- CLE – Shedeur Sanders – 19/31, 297 yards, 2 TD
- NO – Tyler Shough – 21/35, 265 yards, TD

**Top rushers**

- CLE – Quinshon Judkins – 15 rushes, 43 yards
- NO – Audric Estimé – 15 rushes, 72 yards, TD

**Top receivers**

- CLE – Denzel Boston – 6 receptions, 98 yards
- NO – Chris Olave – 7 receptions, 98 yards

==== Week 10: vs. Houston Texans ====
Week 10: Houston Texans at Cleveland Browns – Game summary

Quarter	1	2	3	4	Total
Texans	10	7	0	7	**24**
**Browns**	0	10	10	7	**27**

at Huntington Bank Field, Cleveland, Ohio

- Date: November 15
- Game time: 1:00 p.m. EST
- Game weather: Cloudy, 46 °F (8 °C)
- Game attendance: 58,342
- Referee: Shawn Smith
- TV announcers (Fox): Kenny Albert, Jonathan Vilma, and Megan Olivi
- Recap, Game Book

Game information

**First quarter**

- HOU – Nico Collins 12-yard pass from C. J. Stroud (Ka'imi Fairbairn kick), 9:29. Texans 7–0. **Drive: 6 plays, 61 yards, 3:53.**
- HOU – Ka'imi Fairbairn 45-yard field goal, 4:25. Texans 10–0. **Drive: 8 plays, 53 yards, 3:33.**

**Second quarter**

- HOU – Xavier Hutchinson 11-yard pass from C. J. Stroud (Ka'imi Fairbairn kick), 11:21. Texans 17–0. **Drive: 9 plays, 75 yards, 4:32.**
- CLE – Andre Szmyt 49-yard field goal, 9:02. Texans 17–3. **Drive: 7 plays, 39 yards, 2:19.**
- CLE – Deshaun Watson 6-yard run (Andre Szmyt kick), 4:12. Texans 17–10. **Drive: 2 plays, 71 yards, 0:53.**

**Third quarter**

- CLE – KC Concepcion 6-yard run (Andre Szmyt kick), 8:35. Tied 17–17. **Drive: 5 plays, 47 yards, 2:13.**
- CLE – Andre Szmyt 26-yard field goal, 0:12. Browns 20–17. **Drive: 15 plays, 74 yards, 6:07.**

**Fourth quarter**

- HOU – Dalton Schultz 11-yard pass from C. J. Stroud (Ka'imi Fairbairn kick), 9:17. Texans 24–20. **Drive: 5 plays, 56 yards, 1:45.**
- CLE – Quinshon Judkins 5-yard run (Andre Szmyt kick), 0:53. Browns 27–24. **Drive: 3 plays, 49 yards, 0:47.**

**Top passers**

- HOU – C. J. Stroud – 20/38, 211 yards, 3 TD, INT
- CLE – Deshaun Watson – 25/40, 312 yards, INT

**Top rushers**

- HOU – Woody Marks – 12 rushes, 50 yards
- CLE – Deshaun Watson – 7 rushes, 49 yards, TD

**Top receivers**

- HOU – Nico Collins – 9 receptions, 94 yards, TD
- CLE – Harold Fannin Jr. – 7 receptions, 91 yards

The Browns erased a 17–0 deficit and beat the Texans, 27–24. With the win, the Browns started 4–0 at home for the first time since 1963.

==== Week 12: vs. Las Vegas Raiders ====
Week 12: Las Vegas Raiders at Cleveland Browns – Game summary

Quarter	1	2	3	4	Total
Raiders	0	0	0	0	**0**
Browns	0	0	0	0	**0**

at Huntington Bank Field, Cleveland, Ohio

- Date: November 29
- Game time: 8:20 p.m. EST
- TV announcers (NBC): Mike Tirico, Cris Collinsworth and Melissa Stark
- Preview

=== Standings ===
==== Division ====
AFC North
	W	L	T	PCT	DIV	CONF	PF	PA	STK
Cincinnati Bengals	7	2	0	.778	2–1	5–2	278	193	W5
Cleveland Browns	6	4	0	.600	2–1	4–3	188	220	W1
Pittsburgh Steelers	6	4	0	.600	2–2	3–3	214	201	L2
Baltimore Ravens	4	7	0	.364	0–2	2–5	242	294	L6

==== Conference ====
AFC
Seed	Team	Division	W	L	T	PCT	DIV	CONF	SOS	SOV	STK
**Division leaders**
1	Buffalo Bills	East	9	1	0	.900	2–1	6–1	.424	.416	W6
2	Kansas City Chiefs	West	8	2	0	.800	3–1	6–1	.374	.300	W3
3 (Note: Jacksonville wins tie break over Cincinnati based on head-to-head victory.)	Jacksonville Jaguars	South	7	2	0	.778	2–1	6–2	.444	.408	W3
4	Cincinnati Bengals	North	7	2	0	.778	2–1	5–2	.389	.310	W5
**Wild cards**
5	Denver Broncos	West	7	2	0	.778	2–1	3–1	.591	.522	W5
6 (Note: Cleveland wins tie break over Pittsburgh based on division record.)	Cleveland Browns	North	6	4	0	.600	2–1	4–3	.410	.377	W1
7	Pittsburgh Steelers	North	6	4	0	.600	2–2	3–3	.465	.417	L2
**In the hunt**
8	New England Patriots	East	5	5	0	.500	3–0	5–1	.576	.440	L2
9 (Note: Houston wins tie break over Las Vegas based on strength of victory.)	Houston Texans	South	4	6	0	.400	3–1	4–4	.480	.308	W1
10	Las Vegas Raiders	West	4	6	0	.400	1–1	3–3	.500	.179	L2
11	Baltimore Ravens	North	4	7	0	.364	0–2	2–5	.459	.286	L6
12	Indianapolis Colts	South	3	8	0	.273	1–3	2–6	.463	.293	L1
13	New York Jets	East	2	8	0	.200	0–3	2–5	.560	.350	L5
14	Los Angeles Chargers	West	1	8	0	.111	0–3	1–5	.560	.364	W1
15 (Note: Tennessee wins tie break over Miami based on strength of victory.)	Tennessee Titans	South	1	9	0	.100	1–2	1–6	.465	.273	L4
16	Miami Dolphins	East	1	9	0	.100	1–2	1–6	.622	.200	L4
