= Karene Reid =

American football linebacker (born 2000)

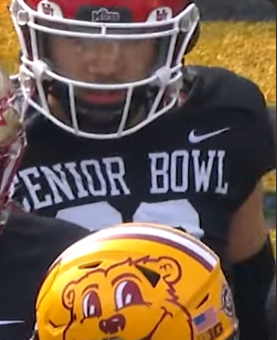
- Reid at the 2025 Senior Bowl

No. 47 – Denver Broncos
- Position: Inside linebacker
- Roster status: Active

Personal information
- Born: February 19, 2000 (age 26); American Fork, Utah, U.S.
- Listed height: 6 ft 0 in (1.83 m)
- Listed weight: 226 lb (103 kg)

Career information
- High school: Timpview (Provo, Utah)
- College: Utah (2021–2024)
- NFL draft: 2025: undrafted

Career history
- Denver Broncos (2025–present)

Awards and highlights
- 2× Second-team All-Pac-12 (2022, 2023)

Career NFL statistics as of Week 10, 2025
- Total tackles: 5
- Stats at Pro Football Reference

Karene Reid (/kɑːˈrɛneɪ/ kah-REH-nay; born February 19, 2000) is an American professional football inside linebacker for the Denver Broncos of the National Football League (NFL). He played college football for the Utah Utes and was signed by the Broncos as an undrafted free agent in 2025.

== Early life ==
Reid was born on February 19, 2000 in American Fork, Utah to Spencer and Marrieta Reid. He attended Timpview High School in Provo, Utah, where he racked up 185 tackles with 26 being for a loss, 5.5 sacks, one pass deflection, two interceptions, and a forced fumble on the football team. He initially committed to play college football at the Utah State, but later decided to walk on at the University of Utah.

== College career ==
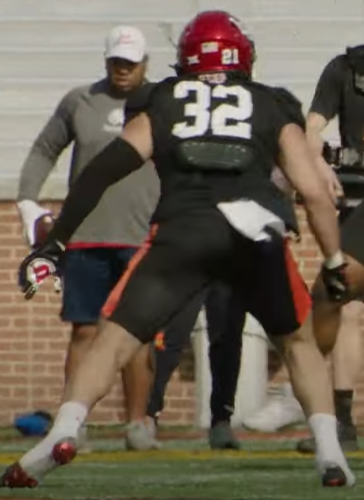
Reid playing at the 2025 Senior Bowl

In his first career game in 2021, Reid tallied 15 tackles, a sack, and an interception in a win over Washington State, earning Pac-12 Conference freshman of the week honors. He finished the season with 45 tackles with two of them going for a loss, a sack, two pass deflections, and an interception. In week 3 of the 2022 season, Reid intercepted a pass and had half a sack in a 35–7 win over San Diego State. In week 12, he recovered a fumble and returned it 11 yards for a touchdown in a 20–17 loss to Oregon. Reid finished his 2022 season with 72 tackles with 9.5 being for a loss, five sacks, three pass deflections, an interception, a fumble recovery, a forced fumble, and a touchdown, and was named second-team all-Pac-12.

Ahead of the 2023 season, Reid was named to the Butkus Award watchlist, which is awarded to the nation's best linebacker, as well as a preseason first-team all-Pac-12 selection. In 2023, he appeared in 11 games, posting 67 tackles with two tackles for loss, four pass deflections, and one interception, earning second-team all-Pac-12 honors.

== Professional career ==
Pre-draft measurables
Height	Weight	Arm length	Hand span	Wingspan	Bench press
6 ft 0 in (1.83 m)	231 lb (105 kg)	31 3/8 in (0.80 m)	9 1/4 in (0.23 m)	6 ft 3 3/4 in (1.92 m)	17 reps
All values from Pro Day

After going unselected in the 2025 NFL draft, Reid signed with the Denver Broncos as an undrafted free agent. He made the initial 53-man roster to start the season after a standout preseason performance. On November 11, 2025, Reid was placed on injured reserve due to a hamstring injury suffered in Week 10 against the Las Vegas Raiders. He was activated on January 6, 2026.

== Personal life ==
Reid has two brothers and one sister. His brother Gabe plays college football for the Utah Utes. He is married to his wife, Addison. Reid's father, Spencer, who is originally from American Samoa, was a linebacker in the NFL, playing for the Carolina Panthers and Indianapolis Colts during his career. His uncles, Gabe Reid, Anton Palepoi, and Tenny Palepoi, all played in the NFL. Reid's cousins, Logan and Spencer Fano, also played college football for Utah. Reid is a member of the Church of Jesus Christ of Latter-day Saints.
