= Logan Fano =

American football player (born 2002)

No. 99 – Cleveland Browns
- Position: Defensive lineman
- Roster status: Practice squad

Personal information
- Born: June 18, 2002 (age 24); Spanish Fork, Utah, U.S.
- Listed height: 6 ft 5 in (1.96 m)
- Listed weight: 252 lb (114 kg)

Career information
- High school: Timpview (Provo, Utah)
- College: BYU (2022); Utah (2023–2025)
- NFL draft: 2026: undrafted

Career history
- Cleveland Browns (2026–present)*
- * Offseason or practice squad member only

Awards and highlights
- Second-team All-Big 12 (2025)
- Stats at Pro Football Reference

Logan Fano (born June 18, 2002) is an American professional football defensive lineman for the Cleveland Browns of the National Football League (NFL). He played college football for the Utah Utes and BYU Cougars.

== Early life ==
Fano attended Timpview High School in Provo, Utah. He was rated as a four-star recruit and committed to play college football for the BYU Cougars over other offers from schools such as Arizona State, Michigan, Utah, Oklahoma, Washington, and Wisconsin.

== College career ==
=== BYU ===
After missing his entire freshman season in 2022 due to an ACL injury, he entered his name into the NCAA transfer portal.

=== Utah ===
Fano transferred to play for the Utah Utes. During his first season as a Ute in 2023, he recorded 14 tackles, three and a half sacks, and two forced fumbles in five games before suffering another season-ending ACL injury. In 2024, Fano appeared in 12 games with nine starts, totaling 35 tackles with six and a half being for a loss, two and a half sacks, and a forced fumble. After the 2025 season, he entered the 2026 NFL draft, while also accepting an invite to participate in the 2026 Senior Bowl.

== Professional career ==
Pre-draft measurables
Height	Weight	Arm length	Hand span	Wingspan	40-yard dash	10-yard split	20-yard split	Vertical jump	Broad jump
6 ft 4 7/8 in (1.95 m)	257 lb (117 kg)	31 3/8 in (0.80 m)	9 3/8 in (0.24 m)	6 ft 4 3/4 in (1.95 m)	4.61 s	1.56 s	2.66 s	32.0 in (0.81 m)	9 ft 10 in (3.00 m)
All values from NFL Combine/Pro Day

On May 8, 2026, Fano signed with the Cleveland Browns as an undrafted free agent. On August 30, Fano was waived by the Browns as a part of final roster cuts; he was re-signed to the team's practice squad the following day.

== Personal life ==
Fano is the brother of offensive tackle Spencer Fano. His four uncles, Gabe Reid, Spencer Reid, Anton Palepoi, and Tenny Palepoi, all played in the NFL. His cousin, Karene Reid, is a linebacker for the Denver Broncos. He is of Samoan descent.
