= Spencer Fano =

American football player (born 2004)

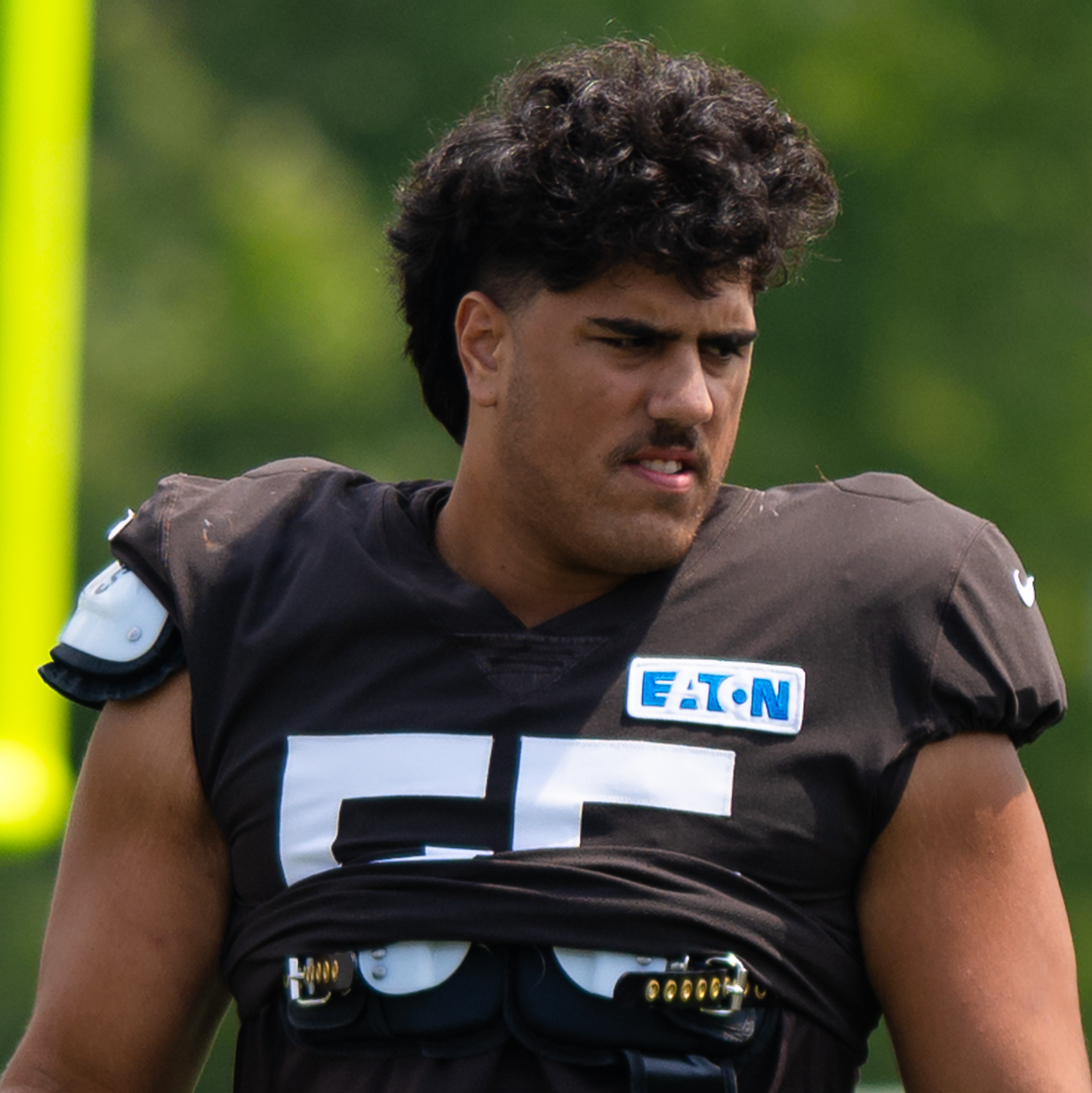
- Fano with the Cleveland Browns in 2026

No. 55 – Cleveland Browns
- Position: Offensive tackle
- Roster status: Active

Personal information
- Born: November 4, 2004 (age 22); Spanish Fork, Utah, U.S.
- Listed height: 6 ft 6 in (1.98 m)
- Listed weight: 315 lb (143 kg)

Career information
- High school: Timpview (Provo, Utah)
- College: Utah (2023–2025)
- NFL draft: 2026: 1st round, 9th overall pick

Career history
- Cleveland Browns (2026–present)

Awards and highlights
- Outland Trophy (2025); Polynesian College Football Player of the Year (2025); Big 12 Offensive Lineman of the Year (2025); Unanimous All-American (2025); First-team All-American (2024); Freshman All-American (2023); 2× First-team All-Big 12 (2024, 2025)

Career NFL statistics as of Week 5, 2026
- Games played: 5
- Games started: 5
- Stats at Pro Football Reference

Spencer Fano (FAH-no; born November 4, 2004) is an American professional football offensive tackle for the Cleveland Browns of the National Football League (NFL). Fano played college football for the Utah Utes, winning the 2025 Outland Trophy, and was selected ninth overall by the Browns in the 2026 NFL draft.

== Early life ==
Fano was born on November 4, 2004 in Spanish Fork, Utah. He attended and played high school football at Timpview High School in Provo, Utah, where he was a top offensive tackle. He helped the school score 76 touchdowns while averaging 40.5 points per game as a senior in 2022, receiving selection to the All-American Bowl while being a first-team All-Class 5A selection and first-team All-Valley choice. He was highly recruited, receiving over 25 athletic scholarship offers while being ranked by 247Sports the second-best player in the state, a four-star recruit and the No. 7 offensive tackle nationally. He ultimately committed to play college football for the Utah Utes.

== College career ==
Fano impressed early on as a true freshman and was named the starting left tackle for Utah to begin the 2023 season. He was only one of two true freshmen in NCAA Division I college football to start at the position to begin the season. He ultimately started all 13 games in 2023 and was selected first-team Freshman All-American after allowing only two sacks. In 2024, he was named a finalist for Polynesian College Football Player of the Year.

== Professional career ==
Pre-draft measurables
Height	Weight	Arm length	Hand span	Wingspan	40-yard dash	10-yard split	20-yard split	20-yard shuttle	Three-cone drill	Vertical jump	Broad jump	Bench press
6 ft 5 1/2 in (1.97 m)	311 lb (141 kg)	32 1/8 in (0.82 m)	9 in (0.23 m)	6 ft 8 1/4 in (2.04 m)	4.91 s	1.72 s	2.84 s	4.67 s	7.34 s	32.0 in (0.81 m)	9 ft 3 in (2.82 m)	30 reps
All values from NFL Combine

Fano was selected in the first round, ninth overall by the Cleveland Browns in the 2026 NFL draft. On May 8, 2026, he signed a four-year, $32.2 million contract with the Browns that included a $19.9 million signing bonus.

== Personal life ==
Fano's brother, Logan, also played at Utah. He is named after his uncle, Spencer Reid, a former NFL linebacker. His three other uncles, Gabe Reid, Anton Palepoi, and Tenny Palepoi, also played in the NFL. His cousin, Karene Reid, is a linebacker for the Denver Broncos. He is of Samoan descent.
