= Spencer Reid =

American-Samoan football player (born 1976)

No. 54, 56
- Position: Linebacker

Personal information
- Born: February 8, 1976 (age 50); Pago Pago, American Samoa
- Listed height: 6 ft 1 in (1.85 m)
- Listed weight: 247 lb (112 kg)

Career information
- High school: Leone (Vailoatai, American Samoa)
- College: BYU (1994–1997)
- NFL draft: 1998: undrafted

Career history
- Carolina Panthers (1998); Indianapolis Colts (1999); Carolina Panthers (2000)

Awards and highlights
- Second-team All-WAC (1997)

Career NFL statistics
- Games played: 28
- Stats at Pro Football Reference

Spencer Eldon Karene Reid (born February 8, 1976) is an American Samoan former professional football player. A linebacker, he attended high school in American Samoa before playing college football for the BYU Cougars from 1994 to 1997. He later played two seasons in the National Football League (NFL) for the Carolina Panthers and Indianapolis Colts before an injury ended his career.

== Early life ==
Spencer Eldon Karene Reid was born on February 8, 1976, in Pago Pago, American Samoa. He was named after LDS Church President Spencer W. Kimball and met him as a child. He attended Leone High School in Vailoatai, where he played football as a linebacker. He told the News & Record of his homeland: "It's a beautiful island, way on the other side of the world. There's no McDonald's. There's no nothing. You've got the beaches. You've got the waterfalls. You've got four high schools out there, so we play each other twice [in football]." He was recruited by several schools to play college football. Reid initially planned on attending the University of Hawaiʻi at Mānoa, but after attending a football camp at Brigham Young University (BYU) he "fell in love with the school" and decided to play for the BYU Cougars.

== College career ==
Reid played for the Cougars from 1994 to 1997, lettering all four years. Towards the end of the 1995 season, he was put in a starting role at middle linebacker after the suspension of team co-captain Shay Muirbrook. He helped the 1995 Cougars compile a record of 7–4 with a Western Athletic Conference (WAC) championship. The next year, he started all 15 games as a strongside linebacker and helped the Cougars to a record of 14–1, repeating as WAC champions while also winning the 1997 Cotton Bowl Classic. BYU then compiled a record of 6–5 in 1997, Reid's last season, and he was named the team defensive MVP. He posted 83 tackles, four sacks and three forced fumbles with the Cougars and was named second-team All-WAC for his senior season. At the conclusion of his collegiate career, he was invited to the Blue–Gray Football Classic and the Hula Bowl.

== Professional career ==
After going unselected in the 1998 NFL draft, Reid signed with the Carolina Panthers as an undrafted free agent. After impressing in preseason, he made the team's final roster for the 1998 season. He made his NFL debut in the team's Week 1 loss to the Atlanta Falcons and ended up appearing in all 16 games for the Panthers that year. Reid was one of two undrafted rookies to play the entire season for the Panthers and was used mainly on special teams, posting five tackles there. In the last preseason game in 1999, he recovered an onside kick with one second left that helped the Panthers win on the longest field goal in franchise history up to this point. Despite this, the Panthers released him on September 5, 1999, prior to the regular season, and he was claimed off waivers by the Indianapolis Colts the next day. He was inactive for four games early in the season. Reid finished having appeared in 12 regular season games for the Colts as a backup, posting 11 total tackles, nine on special teams and two on defense. He also appeared in one playoff game and made one tackle. He was traded back to the Panthers on April 20, 2000, in exchange for Fred Lane. Reid suffered a neck injury and was placed on injured reserve on August 22, 2000. He became a free agent on March 2, 2001, and was not re-signed by Carolina, with his injury ending his career. Reid appeared in 28 NFL games in his career.

== Personal life ==
Several members of Reid's family have also played football. His brother Gabe played for BYU and later in the NFL, while other brothers Jared, Gordon and Adney each played in college. His sons, Karene and Gabe, played at Utah; Karene now plays in the NFL for the Denver Broncos. His cousin fathered Utah players Logan and Spencer Fano; the latter is named after Reid.
