= Denzel Boston =

American football player (born 2003)

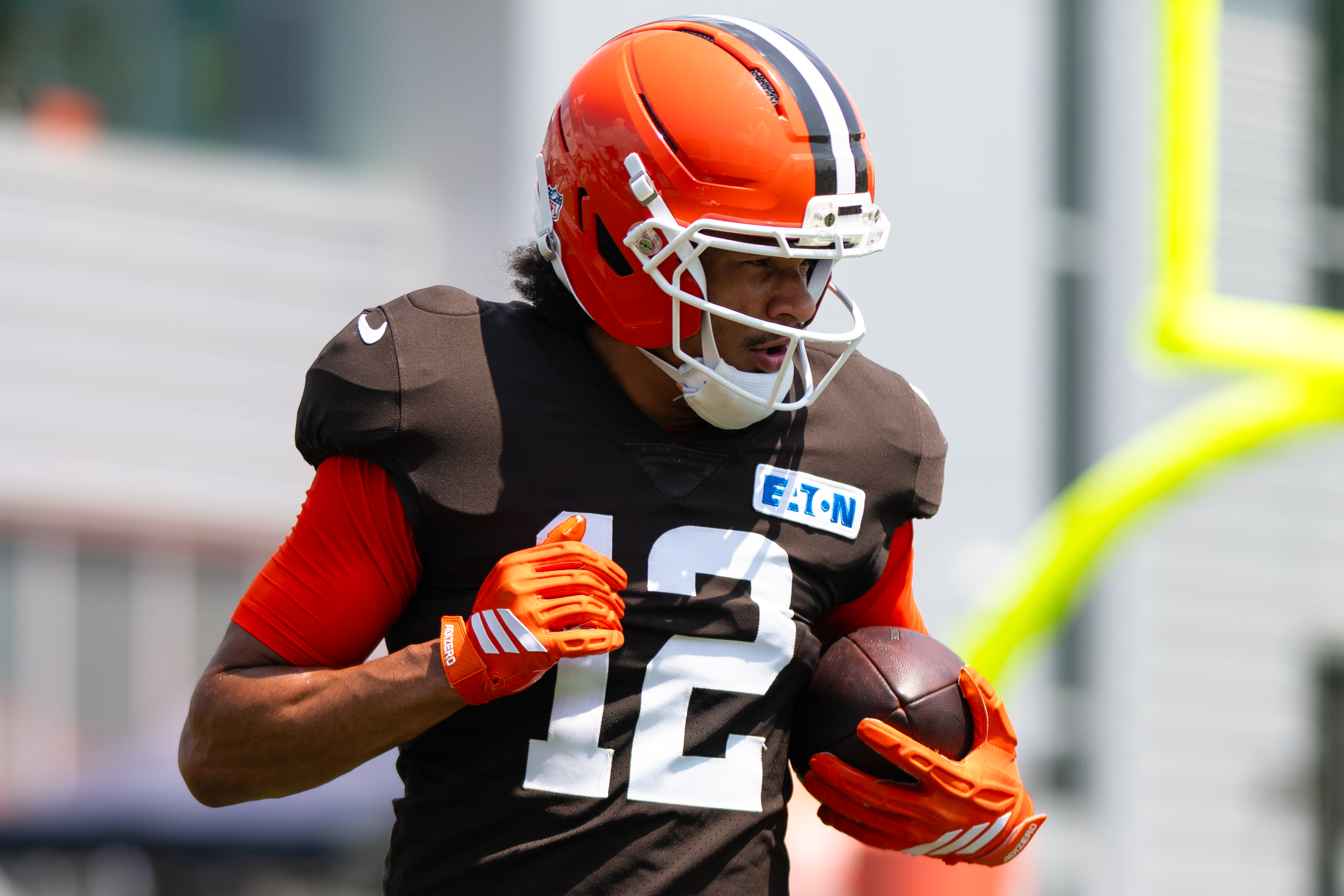
- Boston with the Cleveland Browns in 2026

No. 12 – Cleveland Browns
- Position: Wide receiver
- Roster status: Active

Personal information
- Born: December 6, 2003 (age 22); Boise, Idaho, U.S.
- Listed height: 6 ft 4 in (1.93 m)
- Listed weight: 215 lb (98 kg)

Career information
- High school: Emerald Ridge (Puyallup, Washington)
- College: Washington (2022–2025)
- NFL draft: 2026: 2nd round, 39th overall pick

Career history
- Cleveland Browns (2026–present)

Awards and highlights
- Third-team All-Big Ten (2025)

Career NFL statistics as of Week 10, 2026
- Receptions: 33
- Receiving yards: 523
- Receiving touchdowns: 3
- Stats at Pro Football Reference

Denzel Boston (born December 6, 2003) is an American professional football wide receiver for the Cleveland Browns of the National Football League (NFL). Boston played college football for the Washington Huskies and was selected by the Browns in the second round of the 2026 NFL draft.

== Early life ==
Boston was born on December 6, 2003 in Boise, Idaho. Boston attended Emerald Ridge High School in Puyallup, Washington where he had 105 receptions for 1,572 yards and 23 touchdowns in his career. He committed to the University of Washington to play college football.

== College career ==
Boston played behind Rome Odunze, Jalen McMillan, and Ja'Lynn Polk over his first two years for Washington. Over 18 games he had seven receptions for 66 yards and one rushing touchdown. With all three players now in the NFL, Boston became a starter in 2024.

Boston made 12 appearances for Washington during the 2025 season, recording 62 receptions for 881 yards and 11 touchdowns. On December 24, 2025, Boston declared for the 2026 NFL draft.

== Professional career ==
Pre-draft measurables
Height	Weight	Arm length	Hand span	Wingspan	20-yard shuttle	Three-cone drill	Vertical jump
6 ft 3 5/8 in (1.92 m)	212 lb (96 kg)	32 in (0.81 m)	9 3/4 in (0.25 m)	6 ft 5 3/8 in (1.97 m)	4.28 s	6.80 s	37.5 in (0.95 m)
All values from NFL Combine/Pro Day

Boston was drafted by the Cleveland Browns in the second round, with the 39th overall pick, of the 2026 NFL draft. In his NFL debut against the Jacksonville Jaguars, Boston scored his first career touchdown, on a 46–yard reception from Deshaun Watson.

== Career statistics ==
=== NFL ===
NFL regular season statistics
Year	Team	Games		Receiving					Fumbles	
Year	Team	GP	GS	Rec	Yds	Avg	Lng	TD	Fum	Lost
2026	CLE	10	10	33	523	15.8	60	3	0	0
Career		10	10	33	523	15.8	60	3	0	0

=== College ===
Year	Team	GP	Receiving			
Year	Team	GP	Rec	Yds	Avg	TD
2022	Washington	4	2	15	7.5	0
2023	Washington	14	5	51	10.2	0
2024	Washington	13	63	834	13.2	9
2025	Washington	12	62	881	14.2	11
Career		43	132	1,781	13.5	20
