= Matt Asiata =

American football player (born 1987)

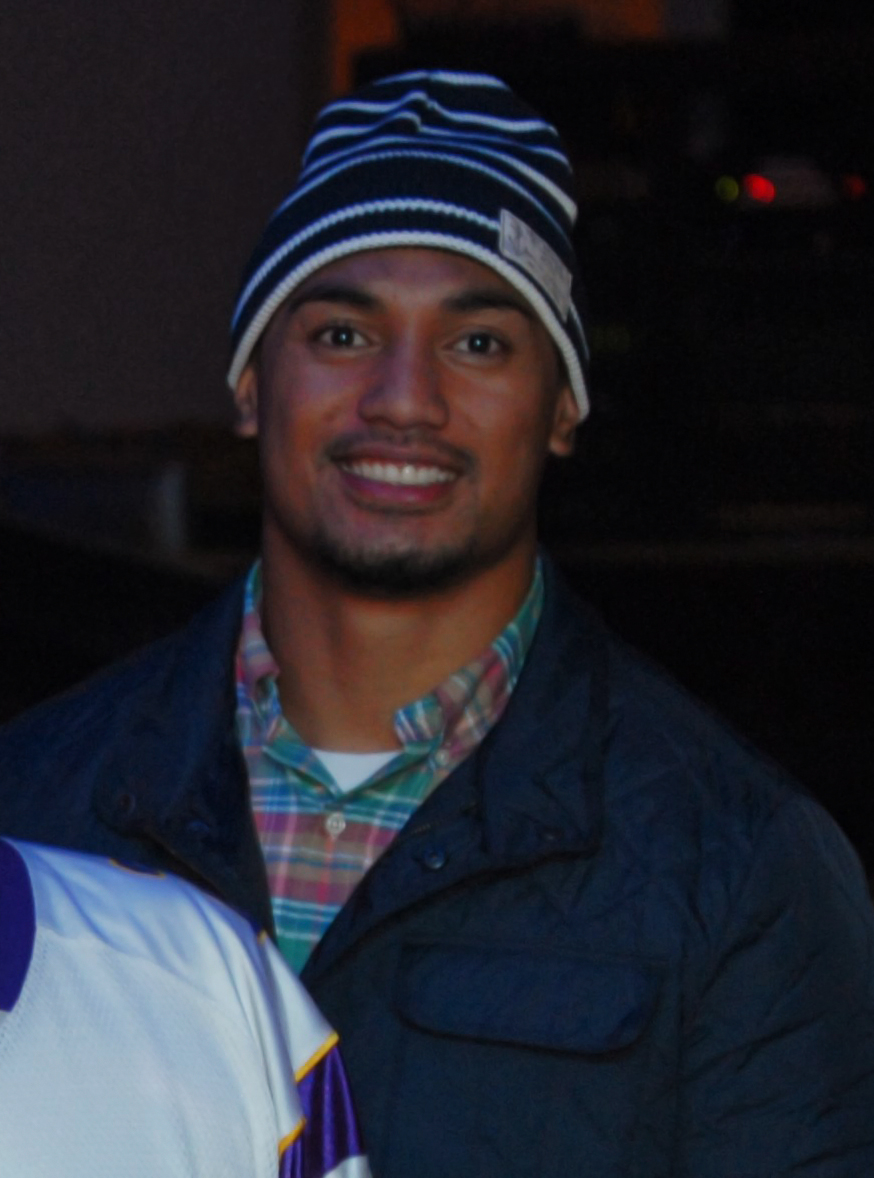
- Asiata in 2013

No. 41, 44, 48
- Position: Running back

Personal information
- Born: July 24, 1987 (age 39); Garden Grove, California, U.S.
- Listed height: 5 ft 11 in (1.80 m)
- Listed weight: 230 lb (104 kg)

Career information
- High school: Hunter (West Valley City, Utah)
- College: Snow (2005–2006); Utah (2007–2010)
- NFL draft: 2011: undrafted

Career history
- Minnesota Vikings (2011)*; Omaha Nighthawks (2011); Minnesota Vikings (2012–2016); Detroit Lions (2017)*; Salt Lake Stallions (2019)
- * Offseason or practice squad member only

Career NFL statistics
- Rushing yards: 1,259
- Rushing average: 3.5
- Rushing touchdowns: 18
- Receptions: 101
- Receiving yards: 722
- Receiving touchdowns: 1
- Stats at Pro Football Reference

Matthew Retinai Asiata (born July 24, 1987) is an American former professional football player who was a running back in the National Football League (NFL) and Alliance of American Football (AAF). He attended Hunter High School and played college football for the Utah Utes. Asiata was signed by the Minnesota Vikings as an undrafted free agent. Asiata is tied with a number of other Vikings players for the franchise record of most rushing touchdowns in a single game at three. He achieved this feat three times; once in 2013 and twice during the 2014 season when he started nine games after Adrian Peterson was suspended.

== Early life ==
Born in Garden Grove, California, to Samoan parents, Asiata graduated from Hunter High School in West Valley City, Utah, where he was a standout running back for the Wolverines.

In his freshman year of high school in 2003, Asiata and the Wolverines won Hunter High's first UHSAA Class 5A football championship ever over Skyline. He was also a member the state champion basketball team that same year.

== College career ==
=== Snow College ===
After failing to qualify out of high school, Asiata spent two seasons at Snow College in Ephraim, Utah, where he played as a running back. In his first year, he rushed for 781 yards on 144 carries (5.4 ypc) and scored five touchdowns. In 2006, his sophomore year, Asiata set a new school record for single-season rushing yards with 1,494 despite missing one game with a hamstring injury. In a four-game stretch, he rushed for 459 yards (114.8 yards a game) on 61 carries (7.5 ypc) and scored six touchdowns.

=== University of Utah ===
Listed at 6'0" and 232 lbs, Asiata was given a three-star rating and was considered the 79th best running back in the nation according to Rivals.com. On December 11, 2006, Asiata committed to the University of Utah. He also had a scholarship offer from UNLV. Asiata attended the University of Utah from 2007 to 2010, where he went on to become an All-Conference pick at running back. Asiata finished his career with the Utes ranked third all-time at Utah with 24 career rushing touchdowns. He scored 26 total career touchdowns (rushing and receiving) to tie for third all-time. His 1,748 career rushing yards make him the school's fourteenth-leading rusher. During his college career, he had three 100-yard games, with a high game of 156 yards in 200. In 2009, he received an NCAA medical extension to his playing clock, allowing him a sixth year in 2010.

==== 2008 season ====
After breaking his leg in the very first game of the 2007 season at Oregon State, Asiata returned in 2008 and played in all 13 games with one start. He led the Utes in carries with 146, rushing with a career-high 707 yards (4.8 ypc and 54.4 ypg) and touchdowns with 12, which tied for second-best in the Mountain West Conference. He also had 13 receptions for 111 yards and one touchdown and completed 2-of-3 passes out of the "Asiata Formation," with both completions going for touchdowns. His biggest outcome of the season came in Week 4 against the Air Force when he had 19 carries for 116 yards. Other big games included 85 yards against New Mexico on November 1 and 83 against San Diego State on November 15. The Utes went undefeated, going 13–0, and went on to face Alabama in the 2009 Sugar Bowl. The Utes won the game and created controversy over the fact that the Utes were not in the BCS Championship Bowl that was played between two teams with 1 loss each. At the end of the season, Utah was the only remaining undefeated team in the country and was ranked #2 on the Associated Press (AP) Final Poll.

==== 2009 season ====
In his sophomore season, Asiata played and started in four games before breaking his leg during the game against Louisville. Prior to the injury, he was averaging a league-leading 101.3 yards per game and his four rushing touchdowns also led the league at the time. He finished with 74 carries for 330 yards (4.5 ypc) for an average of 82.5 yards per game and also had nine receptions for 88 yards. In the season opener game, he carried the ball 36 times for a career-high 156 yards against in-state rival Utah State. His 36 carries tied the fourth-best single-game total in school history. The following week, he had 94 yards on 20 carries against San Jose State.

==== 2010 season ====
In his junior season, Asiata played in all 13 games, starting seven of them at running back. He rushed 155 times for 695 yards (4.5 yards per carry). His average of 53.5 yards per game ranked ninth in the Mountain West Conference, while his nine total touchdowns (eight rushing and one receiving) tied for ninth. In Week 6, he had Utah's only 100-yard rushing game of the season with a 109-yard performance against Wyoming. On October 30, he totaled 95 yards against Air Force on 26 carries. In Week 12, he scored the game-winning touchdown against BYU on a 3-yard run. He was fourth on the team with 32 receptions for 195 yards and one touchdown.

== Professional career ==
External videos
- Matt Asiata's NFL Combine Workout

Pre-draft measurables
Height	Weight	Arm length	Hand span	40-yard dash	10-yard split	20-yard split	20-yard shuttle	Three-cone drill	Vertical jump	Broad jump	Bench press
5 ft 11 in (1.80 m)	229 lb (104 kg)	30 1/8 in (0.77 m)	9 1/2 in (0.24 m)	4.87 s	1.70 s	2.75 s	4.37 s	7.06 s	30.0 in (0.76 m)	8 ft 8 in (2.64 m)	22 reps
All values from 2011 NFL Combine/Pro Day

=== Minnesota Vikings ===
==== 2011 season ====
On July 27, 2011, Asiata signed with the Minnesota Vikings as an undrafted free agent after the lockout ended and spent training camp and preseason with the team. He was released by the team during the final cuts but was then placed on the practice squad on September 5, but two days later he got cut. After no NFL teams claimed his services, he spent a couple of weeks with UFL's Omaha Nighthawks on a tryout.

==== 2012 season ====
After spending 2011 out of football, James Saxon (the running backs assistant) convinced head coach Leslie Frazier to give Asiata another shot in the offseason of 2012. On January 5, 2012, Asiata was re-signed by the team. At the start of the 2012 season, Asiata earned a roster spot due to his special team's abilities and was named the third running back on the Vikings depth chart, beating out other running backs Jordan Todman and Lex Hilliard.

Asiata saw action mostly as a special teamer in all 16 regular-season games. In the season opener against the Jacksonville Jaguars on September 9, he caught his first career pass and returned a pair of kickoffs. On December 30, Asiata and the Vikings won their final game of the regular season against the 11–4 Green Bay Packers to put them into the Wild Card Round of the playoffs instead of the Chicago Bears.

==== 2013 season ====
In his second season with the team, Asiata played an integral part on special teams and stepped in at running back late in the season due to injuries. On December 15, Asiata filled in for both injured running backs Adrian Peterson and Toby Gerhart and managed three rushing touchdowns of one, one, and five yards in a 48–30 win over the Philadelphia Eagles, despite gaining just 51 yards on 30 carries. His three touchdowns tied the record for the most rushing touchdowns by a Viking in a single game and made him the first NFL player since Vikings' quarterback Daunte Culpepper to rush for three touchdowns in his first career start. The following week, he ran for a career-high 115 rushing yards on 14 carries in the season finale against the 7–8 Detroit Lions. Asiata, while playing in 11 games and starting a game, finished the year with 44 carries for 166 yards (3.8 avg) and three touchdowns on the ground, while also hauling in five passes for 13 yards and returning two kickoffs for 28 yards.

==== 2014 season ====
After Adrian Peterson was placed on the commissioner's exempt list for the remainder of the 2014 season following Week 1, Asiata filled in for him, playing 11 games and starting 9 of those, a career-high. Asiata shared the backfield with rookie Jerick McKinnon, but he still set career-highs and led the team in rushing attempts with 164, rushing yards with 570, and rushing touchdowns with nine, which tied for the third-best mark in the league. In Week 4, Asiata tied his own hat-trick record with three touchdowns against the weak Atlanta Falcons' defense. Asiata again ran for three touchdowns during the 29–26 win over the Washington Redskins on November 2, becoming the first player in NFL history to reach nine career rushing touchdowns on the strength of three separate three-touchdown performances, per Elias Sports Bureau. In Week 17, he rushed for a season-high 91 yards on 19 carries in the season finale win against the Chicago Bears. For the 2014 season, Asiata finished with 570 yards on 164 carries (averaging 3.5 yards a carry) with a career-high nine touchdowns, and also caught 44 passes for 312 yards and a touchdown.

==== 2015 season ====
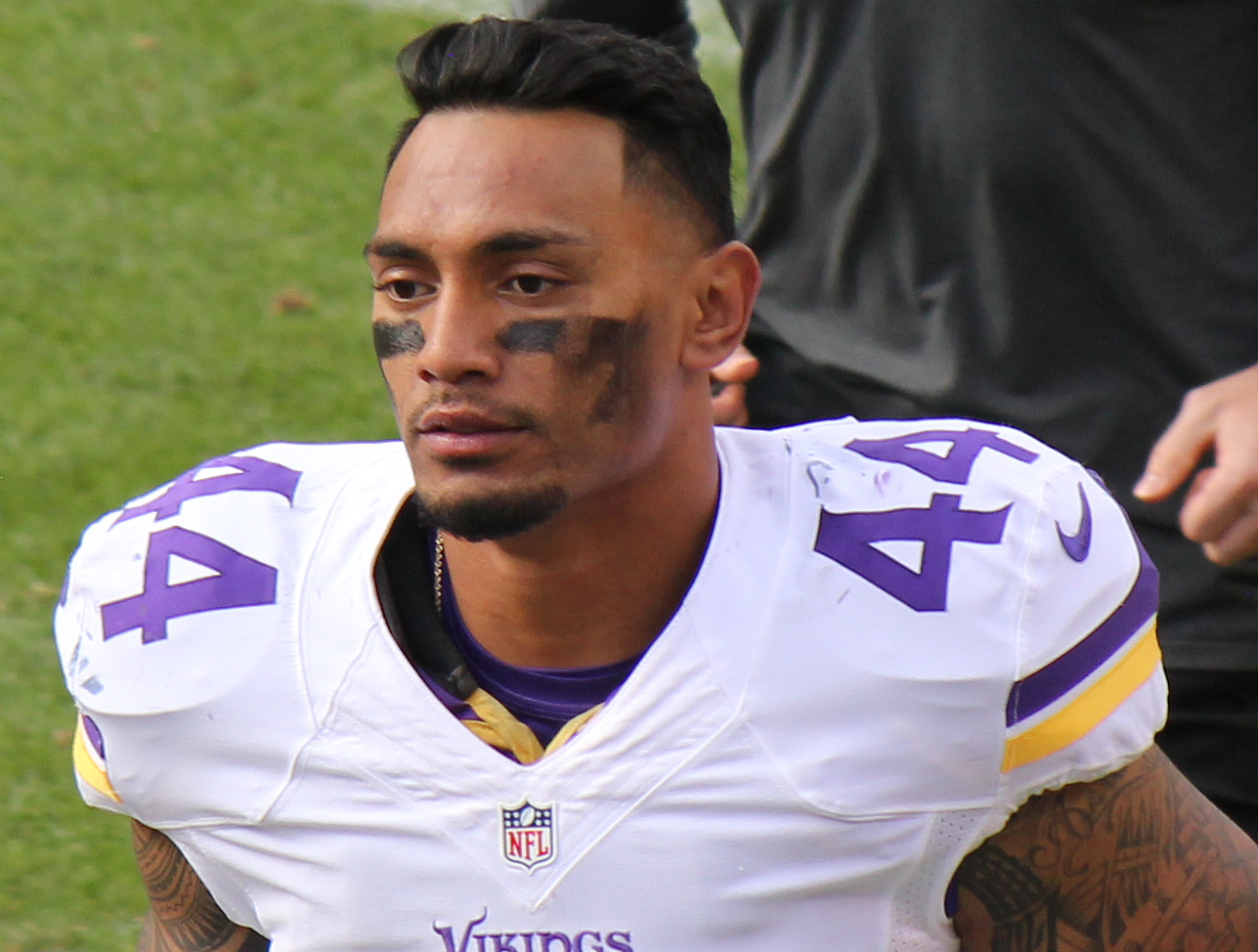
Asiata in 2015.

In 2015, Asiata played in all 16 games for the second time in his career, and also played in his second career playoff game. With Peterson's return, Asiata came back to special teams, corralling a career-high six special teams tackles. For the most part of the season, he entered the field only on third-down situations due to his superior blocking and receiving skills, and had 29 carries for 112 yards (3.9 avg) and caught 19 passes for 132 yards (6.9 avg) in the regular season.

==== 2016 season ====
On March 16, Asiata re-signed with the Vikings. After Adrian Peterson was lost for a majority of the season due to a torn meniscus in Week 2 against the Green Bay Packers, Asiata earned the start for the game at Carolina in Week 3, but carried the ball just six times for 15 yards, and caught his lone target for four yards. He finished the 2016 season with 121 carries for 402 rushing yards and six rushing touchdowns to go with 32 receptions for 263 receiving yards in 16 games and six starts.

=== Detroit Lions ===
On May 30, 2017, Asiata signed with the Detroit Lions. On September 1, he was released by the Lions.

=== Salt Lake Stallions ===
On October 4, 2018, Asiata signed with the Salt Lake Stallions of the Alliance of American Football. Asiata's totals were seven rushes for 10 yards and a touchdown. He was placed on injured reserve on March 12, 2019. The league ceased operations in April 2019.

== Career statistics ==
=== NFL ===
Season	Team	Games		Rushing					Fumbles		Receiving					Kick return				
Season	Team	GP	GS	Att	Yds	Avg	Lng	TD	FUM	Lost	Rec	Yds	Avg	Lng	TD	Ret	Yds	Avg	Lng	TD
2012	Minnesota Vikings	16	0	3	9	3.0	5	0	0	0	1	2	2.0	2	0	3	55	18.3	22	0
2013	Minnesota Vikings	11	1	44	166	3.8	39	3	1	1	5	13	2.6	8	0	2	28	14.0	20	0
2014	Minnesota Vikings	15	9	164	570	3.5	19	9	1	1	44	312	7.1	41	1	4	47	11.8	16	0
2015	Minnesota Vikings	16	0	29	112	3.9	19	0	0	0	19	132	6.9	22	0	0	0	0	0	0
2016	Minnesota Vikings	16	6	121	402	3.3	29	6	1	1	32	263	8.2	31	0	1	11	11.0	11	0
	Career	74	16	361	1,259	3.5	39	18	3	3	101	722	7.1	41	1	10	141	14.1	22	0

=== College ===
Year	Team	Rushing					Receiving			Passing		
Year	Team	Att	Yards	Avg	Yds/G	TD	Rec	Yards	TD	Cmp	Att	TD
2008	Utah	146	707	4.8	54.4	12	13	111	1	2	3	2
2009	Utah	74	330	4.5	82.5	4	9	88	0	0	0	0
2010	Utah	155	695	4.5	53.5	8	32	195	1	0	0	0
Career		379	1,748	4.6	56.4	24	54	394	2	2	3	2

== Personal life ==
Asiata is of Samoan descent. He is a member of the Church of Jesus Christ of Latter-Day Saints he is married to his high school sweetheart and has three sons and two daughters. He has a brother, Shawn, who also played as a running back for the Utes, and a cousin, Isaac Asiata, who played as an offensive lineman for the Miami Dolphins and Buffalo Bills. After the Vikings released him in 2011, he went back home to Utah and got a job driving a forklift in a big warehouse. He also appears in the HBO series Game of Thrones as an extra in the 4th season. In 2020 Asiata returned to football by way of coaching his oldest son Ephraim Asiata at Herriman High School then joining Ephraim when transfer to his parents' alma mater in 2021. Matt's son Ephraim was shot on January 13, 2022, and spent nearly a month in the hospital receiving multiple surgeries.
