= Noah Togiai =

American football player (born 1997)

No. 83, 86
- Position: Tight end

Personal information
- Born: July 6, 1997 (age 29); West Valley City, Utah, U.S.
- Listed height: 6 ft 4 in (1.93 m)
- Listed weight: 244 lb (111 kg)

Career information
- High school: Hunter (West Valley City, Utah)
- College: Oregon State (2015–2019)
- NFL draft: 2020: undrafted

Career history
- Philadelphia Eagles (2020)*; Indianapolis Colts (2020); Philadelphia Eagles (2021–2022); Arizona Cardinals (2023)*; Las Vegas Raiders (2023)*; Philadelphia Eagles (2023)
- * Offseason or practice squad member only
- Stats at Pro Football Reference

Noah Togiai (born July 6, 1997) is a former American professional football tight end. He played college football at Oregon State and was signed as an undrafted free agent by the Eagles in 2020.

== College career ==
Togiai was a member of the Oregon State Beavers for five seasons. As a true freshman he caught 10 passes for 73 yards and one touchdown. After the season, Togiai walked-on to Oregon State's basketball team and played in two games before leaving the team in January 2016 in order to focus on football. He had four receptions for 31 yards and a touchdown in the first game of his sophomore season against Minnesota before using a medical redshirt after spraining ligaments in his right knee in the following game against Idaho. Togiai led the Beavers as a redshirt sophomore 34 receptions and 461 receiving yards with two catches. Togiai missed time during his redshirt junior year due to an ankle injury, starting nine games with 77 yard and three touchdowns on 10 receptions. As a redshirt senior, he caught 44 passes for 406 yards and three touchdowns and was named honorable mention All-Pac-12 Conference. Togiai finished his collegiate career with 102 receptions for 1,048 yards and 10 touchdowns in 44 games played (37 starts).

== Professional career ==
Pre-draft measurables
Height	Weight	Arm length	Hand span	40-yard dash	10-yard split	20-yard split	20-yard shuttle	Three-cone drill	Vertical jump	Broad jump	Bench press
6 ft 3 7/8 in (1.93 m)	244 lb (111 kg)	32 1/4 in (0.82 m)	8 7/8 in (0.23 m)	4.70 s	1.56 s	2.67 s	4.30 s	7.22 s	33.5 in (0.85 m)	9 ft 9 in (2.97 m)	14 reps
All values from Pro Day

=== Philadelphia Eagles (first stint) ===
Togiai was signed by the Philadelphia Eagles as an undrafted free agent on April 25, 2020. He was waived by Philadelphia during final roster cuts on September 5.

=== Indianapolis Colts ===
Togiai was claimed off waivers by the Indianapolis Colts on September 6, 2020. He made his NFL debut on September 20, against the Minnesota Vikings. Togiai was placed on injured reserve due to a knee injury on December 5. On January 2, 2021, Togiai was activated off of injured reserve.

On August 24. 2021, Togiai was waived/injured and placed on injured reserve. He was released by Indianapolis on September 2.

=== Philadelphia Eagles (second stint) ===
Togiai was signed to the practice squad of the Eagles on October 11, 2021. He was placed into COVID protocols on December 27, and was activated eight days later. Togiai signed a reserve/future contract with the Eagles on January 18, 2022.

On August 30, 2022, Togiai was waived by the Eagles as a part of final roster cuts; he was re–signed to the team's practice squad the following day.

=== Arizona Cardinals ===
On February 17, 2023, Togiai signed with the Arizona Cardinals. On August 29, Togiai was released by the Cardinals as a part of final roster cuts before the start of the regular season.

=== Las Vegas Raiders ===
On October 2, 2023, Togiai was signed to the Las Vegas Raiders' practice squad. He was released by the Raiders on October 24.

=== Philadelphia Eagles (third stint) ===
Togiai signed with the practice squad of the Philadelphia Eagles on November 14, 2023. He signed a reserve/future contract with Philadelphia on January 30, 2024, but was waived on May 13.

=== Statistics ===
Regular season statistics
Year	Team	Games		Receiving					Fumbles	
Year	Team	GP	GS	Rec	Yds	Avg	Lng	TD	Fum	Lost
2020	IND	4	0	0	0	0	0	0	0	0
2021	PHI	1	0	0	0	0	0	0	0	0
2022	PHI	2	0	0	0	0	0	0	0	0
2023	PHI	1	0	0	0	0	0	0	0	0
Career		8	0	0	0	0	0	0	0	0
