= Jenna Kim Jones =

American comedian and podcaster (born 1986)

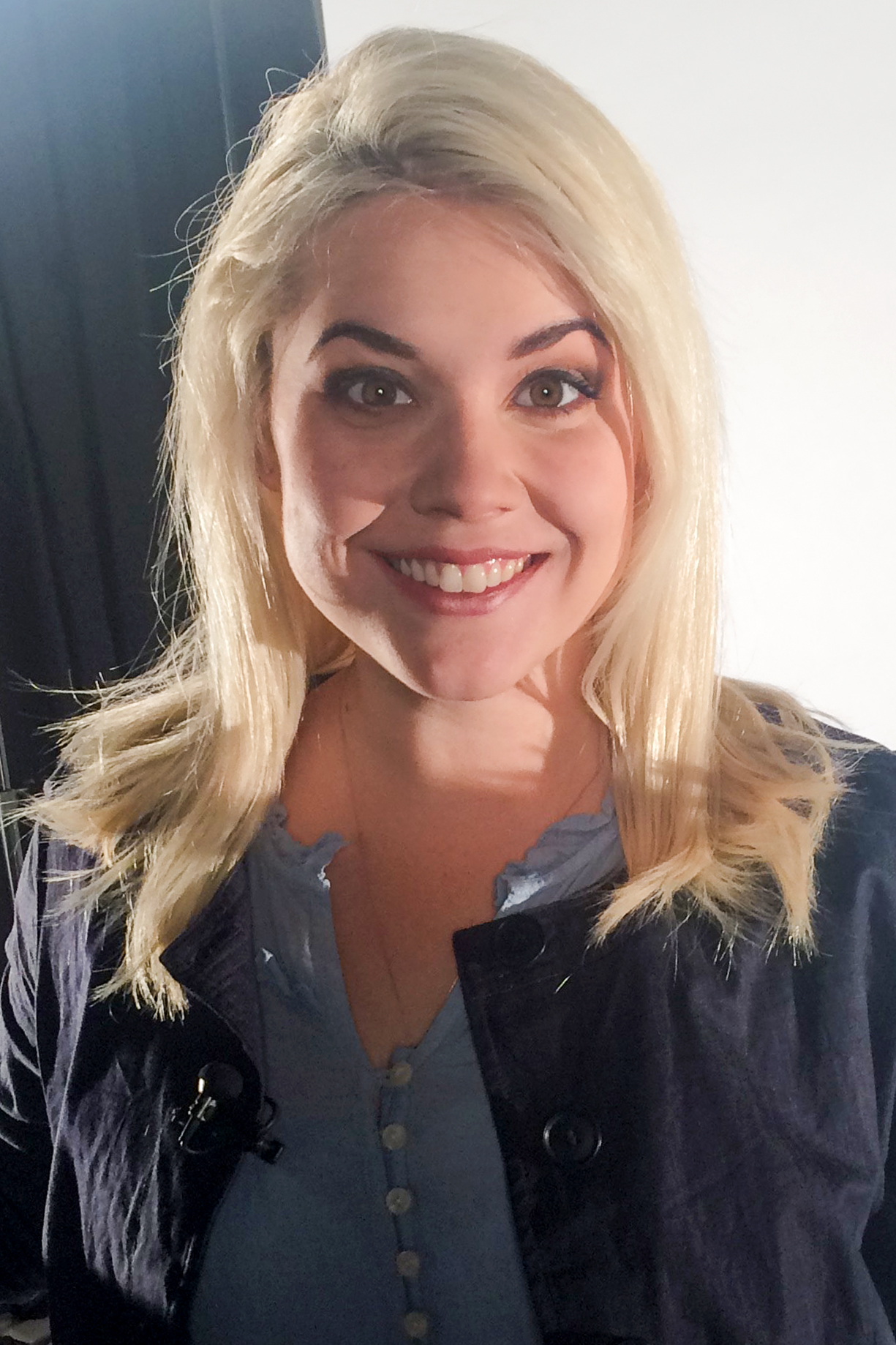
- Born: June 8, 1986 (age 40); Seoul, South Korea
- Education: New York University
- Occupations: Comedian, podcaster, writer
- Years active: 2008-present
- Spouse: Allan Moss (2012-present)
- Children: 4
- Website: jennakimjones.com

Jenna Kim Jones (born June 8, 1986) is an American comedian and podcaster. Known for her on-camera narration in the American documentary film Meet the Mormons (2014), she currently hosts a daily podcast called Couple Friends. Jones is a former Thursday gang regular on the Alison Rosen Is Your New Best Friend podcast.

== Personal life ==
Jones was born in Seoul, South Korea on June 8, 1986. At the age of 8 she relocated with her mother and five siblings to Provo, Utah.

After graduating from Timpview High School in 2004, she moved to New York City to attend New York University.

In July 2012, she married Allan Moss and moved to Los Angeles.

They left Los Angeles during the summer of 2017 and moved to the greater Atlanta, Georgia area.

=== Education ===
Jones graduated from New York University with a Bachelor of Arts in Producing and Writing for Television in 2008.

=== Early career ===
In high school, Jones was a park performer at Utah's Lagoon Amusement Park.

While at NYU, she interned at Follow Productions, The Martha Stewart Show, The Late Show with David Letterman, The Daily Show with Jon Stewart and CBS Primetime Casting.

After graduating from NYU, Jones began working for The Daily Show with Jon Stewart. She worked there from 2008 to 2012 as a script PA. While there, she was introduced to stand-up comedy. She began performing at open mics in 2009 and was asked to help produce and host The Daily Show and Friends, a monthly stand-up show held at the Comix NY comedy club in Lower Manhattan.

Jones worked for Ora TV where she hosted the online web series The Daily Rehash.

== Comedy ==
Jones performs clean stand-up comedy across the United States at public venues and private events. She has released several comedy specials.

=== #SorryNotSorry with Jenna Kim Jones ===
Jones' video debut comedy special was released in 2014 .

=== Jenna Kim Jones Live In Hollywood ===
This audio show was the featured comedy special for the entire month of September 2016 as part of the Everyone Laughs Series Sirius XM Radio Laugh USA Ch. 98

=== Jenna Kim Jones Fun to Hug ===
Released in 2017 by the video streaming service VidAngel part of their Dry Bar Comedy series. This show is currently available to Amazon Prime members as part of their online video offering.

=== Thirsty for Pizza ===
Jones' second audio special recorded over two comedy shows at the Legacy Theatre in Tyrone, GA on June 16, 2018. Featured on Sirius XM Radio Channel 98 Laugh USA.

=== In Case of 2020 ===
Jenna Kim Jones' fifth comedy special recorded September 7, 2020 in Provo, Utah. It will premiere November 6 on Sirius XM Radio Channel 98 Laugh USA.

=== Who Is She?! ===
Jones' latest comedy album premiered November 3, 2023 on Sirius XM Radio Channel 98 Laugh USA.

=== Jenna Kim Jones: She's So Brave ===
Jenna Kim Jones' latest comedy special filmed it on September 17, 2022 in Chandler, Arizona at the Chandler Center for the Arts, premiered Dec 20, 2023.

== Podcast ==
=== Couple Friends ===
Launched March 28, 2019, Couple Friends is an audio show hosted by Jones (also known as "JKJ") and featuring her husband Allan Moss (known as "#Al").

Jones described Couple Friends is an evolution from her previous #SorryNotSorry with Jenna Kim Jones podcast.

On May 1, 2019, Couple Friends was 15-20 minute long and published daily, with a combined episode of the weeks shows on Fridays.

July 2021, the show changed from a daily show to a weekly (released Tuesdays) longer format. The show covers a variety of topics.

2023, The release schedule of the podcast has been changed to a season-based format instead of individual episodes being released one by one.

=== #SorryNotSorry with Jenna Kim Jones ===
Launched February 28, 2014, the #SorryNotSorry with Jenna Kim Jones Podcast was a family-friendly audio show hosted by Jones and featuring her husband Allan Moss. Released weekly, the run time is approximately under an hour. Each show follows the same general outline, with different recurring segments swapped out from show to show.

An example of the show would be introductions, covering a random topic for the first quarter of the show, then a segment or two, followed by Tweets of the Week, and closing with Hopes & Dreams.

#SNSwJKJ segments include:

- Foodie Call - Jones, a self described junk food connoisseur with an impressive knowledge of brands, products and flavors, discusses food news and trends.
- Quench or Parch - A subject is evaluated and decided if it is liked (a quench) or not liked (a parch). Jones and Moss reveal their opinion of the subject at the same time.
- Today's Win! - Listeners submit their stories of irony via Twitter. For example, "#todayswin, I found $5 on the ground walking back to my car, where I had also received a parking ticket."
- #Dear Jenna - Jones and Moss give their non-professional advice on a topic a listener has submitted via email or Twitter.
- Quick on your think! - Jones and Moss (who sometimes talk with a listener via Skype) name a subject and they have five seconds to name three types of the subject.
- Hopes & Dreams - Jones and Moss (or a listener) give a weekly aspiration and a long-term goal that they want to achieve.
- Guests - From time to time Jones has family and friends on the show.
- Live Tweets - A movie, Twitter hashtag, date, and time are all chosen for a Live Tweet event where Jones, Moss, and listeners start to watch the movie at the same time and all tweet during the movie to a designated hashtag.

After 5 years and 354 episodes #SorryNotSorry with Jenna Kim Jones podcast was re-branded and titled Couple Friends.

=== Alison Rosen Is Your New Best Friend ===
Alison Rosen and Jenna Kim Jones met in 2010 while both lived in New York City. A mutual friend felt that Jones would be a good fit on the first incarnation of Rosen's Alison Rosen Is Your New Best Friend Ustream show.

Jones later moved out to California, where Rosen lived. Rosen had Jones on her new Alison Rosen Is Your New Best Friend podcast on June 12, 2013, and Jones became a regular on the Thursday panel show. At the end of 2014 the show changed studios. Jones and Moss supported Rosen with the transition of the podcast.

Jones and Moss stayed on the Alison Rosen Is Your New Best Friend Thursday show as regulars on the until June 2017, when they announced they had bought a house and were moving to Atlanta.

== Writing ==
In addition to writing television sketch comedy, Jones also does freelance writing.

== Movies ==
Jones is the on-camera narrator of Meet the Mormons (2014).

She continues to be the voice behind Meet the Mormons as New Faces / New Stories expands on other people and families not part of the original movie. These new stories are shown exclusively at Temple Square, at select LDS Mormon Visitors' Centers.

== Television ==
On Sept 17, 2018 BYU TV announced Jenna Kim Jones as one of the new hosts of Random Acts season four.

== Music ==
In addition to doing various voiceover work, Jones met house music producer Graham Knox Frazier while working at The Daily Show and released She Don't Care Feat. Jenna Kim Jones on December 6, 2011. Knox's track "Everything" is played as the intro and close music on her podcast.

== Other projects ==
Jenna Tries on Instagram is a project where Jones samples and highlights various snacks and new product offerings.

== Religion ==
Jones, a devout member of the Church of Jesus Christ of Latter-day Saints, was featured in the LDS Church's "I'm a Mormon Campaign".
