= Tre'Von Johnson =

American football player (born 1995)

Tre'von Johnson
No. 58
- Position: Linebacker

Personal information
- Born: February 10, 1995 (age 31); St. Louis, Missouri
- Listed height: 6 ft 1 in (1.85 m)
- Listed weight: 235 lb (107 kg)

Career information
- High school: Hunter (West Valley City, Utah)
- College: Weber State (2013–2016)
- NFL draft: 2017: undrafted

Career history
- Arizona Cardinals (2017)*; Dallas Cowboys (2017); Seattle Seahawks (2018)*; Los Angeles Chargers (2018–2019)
- * Offseason or practice squad member only

Awards and highlights
- Second-team All-Big Sky (2015); All-Big Sky (2016)
- Stats at Pro Football Reference

Tre'Von Johnson (born February 10, 1995) is an American former football linebacker. He played college football at Weber State University.

== Early life ==
Johnson attended Hunter High School, where he was a two-way play at running back and safety. As a senior, he registered 98 carries for 633 yards, 11 touchdowns and 2 interceptions. He earned second-team All-region and 5A honorable-mention All-state honors.

Johnson accepted a football scholarship from Weber State University. As a freshman, he 38 tackles (14 solo) and 2 tackles for loss. The next year, he started in 11 games at safety, recording 62 tackles (fourth on the team), 3.5 tackles for loss, one quarterback pressure and one pass defensed. Against Portland State University, he made 14 tackles (seven solo).

As a junior, he was moved to linebacker, tallying 10 starts, 66 tackles (fourth on the team), 4.5 sacks (sixth in the conference), 9.5 tackles for loss (eighth in the conference). Against the University of Montana, he recorded 13 tackles and 1.5 tackles for loss.

As a senior, he posted 92 tackles, 4.5 sacks (led the team), 12.5 tackles for loss (sixth in the conference). Against the University of South Dakota, he made 15 tackles.

== Professional career ==
=== Arizona Cardinals ===
Johnson signed the Arizona Cardinals as an undrafted free agent on May 2, 2017. He was waived by the Cardinals on September 2.

=== Dallas Cowboys ===
On September 27, 2017, Johnson was signed to the Dallas Cowboys' practice squad. On December 26, he was promoted to the active roster to secure his rights for the 2018 season.

On September 1, 2018, Johnson was waived by the Cowboys.

=== Seattle Seahawks ===
On September 14, 2018, Johnson was signed to the Seattle Seahawks' practice squad, but was released four days later.

=== Los Angeles Chargers ===
On October 10, 2018, Johnson was signed to the Los Angeles Chargers' practice squad. He was promoted to the active roster on November 13. He was waived on December 13 and re-signed to the practice squad. He signed a reserve/future contract with the Chargers on January 14, 2019.

On August 2, 2019, Johnson was waived/injured by the Chargers and placed on injured reserve. He was released on December 5.
