= Hunter High School =

Public high school in West Valley City, Utah, United States

Location
- 4200 South 5600 West; West Valley City, Utah 84120; United States; 40°40′45″N 112°01′36″W

Information
- Type: Free public
- Motto: Touch Not The Claw Without A Glove - The 'glove' of a wolverine is the pad. If the wolverine is 'ungloved', its claws are unsheathed. The motto serves as a warning that one should beware when the wolverine's claws are 'without a glove'.
- Established: 1990
- School district: Granite School District
- Principal: Jennifer Johnson
- Faculty: 164 faculty and staff members
- Teaching staff: 105.25 (FTE)
- Grades: 9–12
- Enrollment: 2,616 (2023–2024)
- Student to teacher ratio: 24.86
- Campus type: Urban
- Colors: Navy, white and gray
- Mascot: Wolverines
- Website: Official website

Hunter High School is a public high school located at 4200 South 5600 West, West Valley City, Utah, United States. It was opened in 1990 with its first graduating class graduating in 1991. During the first school year (1990–1991), the enrollment was below capacity, largely because seniors and juniors (classes of '91 and '92, respectively) were allowed to choose whether to come to Hunter or complete their high school education at their current schools. The school celebrated its 25th anniversary at the end of the 2014–2015 school year.

Hunter High's mascot is the Wolverine and the school's colors are navy, silver, and white. The mascot and school colors were selected by a student vote prior to the school opening, from among a number of alternatives (including the Knights and the Hunters) previously chosen by an ad hoc committee of prospective students. Michigan's uniform colors were among some of the various color-combination suggestions (which also included hunter green and white) considered by the ad hoc committee, but most members of the committee voted against the colors because of neighboring Cyprus High School's colors of blue and gold. The school colors of navy, silver, and white were eventually selected.

The school's fight song is the same as the University of Michigan's. The current lyrics to the school song were written in 1990 by Brian Sorensen, who submitted the lyrics as part of a school-wide contest.

As of 2015 the school expanded, incorporating ninth grade students for the first time. As part of this, portable classrooms were added to the student parking lot, which lessened the parking space available.

== Academics ==
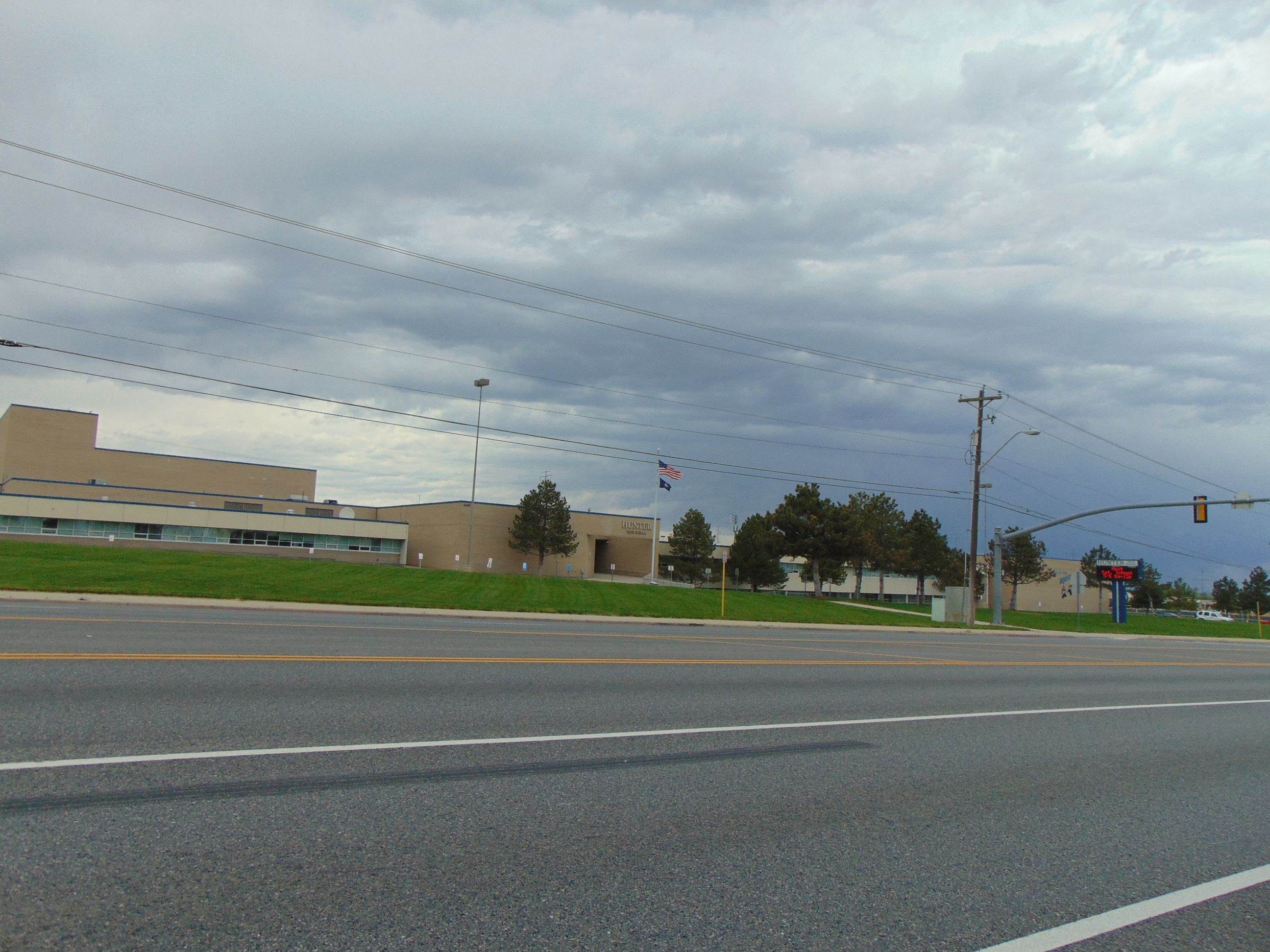
Hunter High School, from across SR-172 (South 5600 West), May 2017

Hunter high offers a broad range of scholastic disciplines ranging from core classes (English, Math, the Sciences, Foreign Languages) to art and trade classes (Auto Mechanics, Electronics, Photography, Video Productions, Drama). Hunter High School is highly regarded for its wide array of foreign language classes. Students have the option of studying Spanish, French, German, Russian, Japanese, and American Sign Language. Hunter has offered the International Baccalaureate (IB) Diploma Program since 2005, but due to lack of funding and student interest, is shutting it down after the class of 2010 graduates. Hunter also offers a wide array of off-campus programs ranging from Travel and Tourism to Aviation to Home Building. Many of these courses are provided in conjunction with Salt Lake Community College.

== Athletics ==
In their first year of competition, Hunter's football team was winless but turned their fortunes around the next year and made it to the "turf" (a reference to the playing surface that was installed at the University of Utah's Rice-Eccles Stadium which hosts the state high school playoffs). Hunter's football team has had repeated success ever since with its run-first offense which, as a result, has given Hunter the nickname of "Tail Back High". In 2003, Hunter's football team won their first state championship. As of the end of the 2005 season, Hunter's overall record is 123-56 and has only three times finished a season under .500 (1990, 1994, and 2007).

On September 19, 2008, the Hunter High football stadium was named "Ed Mayne Stadium" after the late Senator Ed Mayne for all his support in getting lights for the stadium as well as for other athletics in the school.

Like the football team, the basketball team was winless in its first season. 2003 saw Hunter's boys' basketball and hockey teams winning championships. The Drill Team (the Silhouettes) have twice taken state championships in both 1997 and 1998. The boys' swimming team took the 1998 5A State Championship, with several individual championships and All-American performances. The boy's and women's water polo team also took the State Championship in 1999.

The boys' and girls' tennis teams won numerous region titles throughout the 1990s and dominated play out west. The boys' tennis team finished second in state in 2000, with Alan Tran winning the 5A State Championship in #1 Singles while still attending Hunter Junior High School.

In the first season of competition, one of the only sports to perform well was the boys' soccer team, which made it to the state playoff game, unfortunately resulting in a loss.

Hunter High's wrestling team took first in Region II in 2010.

Hunter participates in the following sports:

Boys

- Baseball
- Basketball
- Football
- Hockey
- Soccer
- Swimming
- Tennis
- Water polo

Girls

- Basketball
- Drill (Silhouettes)
- Soccer
- Softball
- Swimming
- Tennis
- Volleyball
- Water polo

Co-ed sports

- Cheerleading
- Cross country
- Golf
- Track & Field
- Wrestling

== Performing arts ==
=== Instrumental ===
There are three instrumental groups at Hunter High that compete in various competitions.

==== Wind Ensemble ====
The band includes brass instruments, woodwind instruments, percussion instruments, and occasionally a piano. There are occasionally some other instruments, but these make up the majority.

Students in Wind Ensemble practice their various pieces throughout the year, performing in a large concert around the Winter holidays, and then competing in a region competition near the end of school in the spring.

==== Jazz Band ====
The Jazz Band is an audition band, and only accepts those committed to learning the music. It emphasizes solos, and the learning of quite advanced pieces of music. They also perform at the Winter Concert with the Wind Ensemble, and participate in their own competition in the early spring.

==== Orchestra ====
This group uses entirely string instruments. They perform in the Winter Concert, and have their own competition as well. Occasionally they will include members of the Wind Ensemble to help them with pieces requiring wind instruments. In 2006, they started accompanying student soloists in Concerto Night, a concert of held near the end of the school year. The first Concerto Night featured Rachmaninoff's Piano Concerto No. 2 and Mozart's Piano Concerto No. 20.

=== Vocal ===
==== Mixed Chorus ====
Mixed Chorus (formerly called Junior Choir) is the entrance choir at Hunter High. Anyone can be in Mixed Chorus. Mixed Chorus practices and performs at school concerts. They do not compete.

==== Concert Choir ====
Concert Choir is an audition choir at Hunter. The standard is a little higher, so the group performs more difficult pieces. As well as school concerts, they also perform in a region competition in the spring.

==== Madrigal Choir ====
The Madrigals are also an audition choir at Hunter. In order to help unify the choir, blend and talent are both key factors in the auditions. This group also performs at the choir concerts, and competes in a region competition in the spring. They are also required to prepare either a solo or smaller group number to be performed at that same competition.

==== Competitions ====
The members of the Drama Department compete in a large competition in the spring. They prepare either group pieces to be acted out, or scenes that can be performed alone. There are very many categories that these fall under, ranging from comedy to dramatic, to pantomime. In 1999 the department took second place overall in the Utah State Dramatic Competition.

=== Dance Company ===
This is a performing arts group that performs at various school functions, including some football games, basketball games, dance concerts and assemblies. In addition, they participate in state competitions, district festival and state adjudication. Every year around April, Dance Company hosts their annual dance concert. The past few years' concerts have been Priceless..., Surrender to the Beat, and Dream it, Live it, Dance it. The company performs styles including modern, jazz, tap, Fosse, Broadway, ballet, contemporary, and lyrical. Dance Company is open to all students of Hunter High, although students wishing to be on the company are required to pass an audition.

== Notable alumni ==
- Matt Asiata — former NFL running back
- Ray Feinga — NFL free agent, notably a former member of the Miami Dolphins, and more recently an AFL player with the San Jose SaberCats
- Tre'Von Johnson — former NFL linebacker
- John Madsen — former NFL tight end
- Anton Palepoi — former NFL defensive end
- Noah Togiai — NFL TE with the Indianapolis Colts and Philadelphia Eagles.

== See also ==
- List of high schools in Utah
