= Mike Affleck =

American football player (born 1984)

No. 14
- Position: Quarterback

Personal information
- Born: December 3, 1984 (age 41); Provo, Utah, U.S.
- Listed height: 6 ft 3 in (1.91 m)
- Listed weight: 230 lb (104 kg)

Career information
- High school: Timpview (Provo)
- College: Utah State
- NFL draft: 2008: undrafted

Career history
- Utah Valley Thunder (2009); Utah Blaze (2010)

Career AFL statistics
- Comp. / Att.: 39 / 73
- Passing yards: 441
- TD–INT: 7–3
- QB rating: 78.62
- Rushing TDs: 1
- Stats at ArenaFan.com

Michael Affleck (born December 3, 1984) is an American former professional football quarterback who played one season with the Utah Blaze of the Arena Football League (AFL). He played college football at Utah State.

== Early life ==
Affleck played high school football for the Timpview High School Thunderbirds of Provo, Utah. He was a Deseret News first-team all-state selection and U.S. Army All-Star nomination for the Thunderbirds. He also earned all-region honors after passing for 2,100 yards with 22 touchdowns and rushing for two touchdowns his senior season, leading Timpview to a 12–1 record. Affleck threw for 4,200 yards and 37 touchdowns in his career. He won the Utah Valley Golden Arm for Most Outstanding Quarterback his senior year and was the MVP of the Colorado Nike Camp in 2002. He also Lettered in both basketball and baseball, earning second-team all-region honors in baseball. Affleck appeared at the Elite 11 quarterback camp in 2002. He graduated from Timpview High School in 2003.

== College career ==
Affleck was redshirted in 2003 as a member of the Arizona State Sun Devils of Arizona State University. He transferred to play for the BYU Cougars of Brigham Young University in 2004. He played for the Dixie State Red Storm of Dixie State College in 2005. Affleck transferred to play for the Utah State Aggies of Utah State University from 2006 to 2007.

== Professional career ==
Affleck played for the Utah Valley Thunder of the American Indoor Football Association in 2009. The Thunder finished with an 11–4 record and a berth in the playoffs. He led the AIFA in passing efficiency at 109.6. He was second in the league in passing yards with 3,037 and third in touchdown passes with 48. Affleck also rushed for 15 touchdowns.

Affleck signed with the Utah Blaze in January 2010. In four games for the Blaze, he completed 39-of-73 passes for 441 yards, seven touchdowns, and three interceptions. He was released by the Blaze in June 2010.
