= Mike Rutenberg =

American football coach (born 1981)

Cleveland Browns
- Position: Defensive coordinator

Personal information
- Born: October 29, 1981 (age 45); Washington, D.C., U.S.

Career information
- High school: Landon School (Bethesda, Maryland)
- College: Cornell (1999–2002)
- NFL draft: 2003: undrafted

Career history
- Washington Redskins (2003–2005); Player personnel intern (2003); Administrative assistant to the head coach (2004–2005); UCLA (2006–2008) Graduate assistant; New Mexico State (2009–2012) Passing game coordinator & defensive backs coach; Jacksonville Jaguars (2013–2019); Assistant defensive backs coach (2013–2015); Defensive assistant (2016–2017); Assistant linebackers coach (2018–2019); San Francisco 49ers (2020) Passing game specialist; New York Jets (2021–2024) Linebackers coach; Atlanta Falcons (2025) Defensive pass game coordinator; Cleveland Browns (2026–present) Defensive coordinator
- Coaching profile at Pro Football Reference

Mike Rutenberg (born October 29, 1981) is an American professional football coach who is currently the defensive coordinator for the Cleveland Browns of the National Football League (NFL). He attended Cornell University and has previously coached for the Washington Redskins, UCLA Bruins, New Mexico State Aggies, Jacksonville Jaguars, San Francisco 49ers, New York Jets, and Atlanta Falcons.

== Early life ==
Rutenberg was born on October 29, 1981, in Washington, D.C. He attended the Landon School in Bethesda, Maryland. After high school, he attended Cornell University in New York from 1999 to 2002. Both his parents had also attended Cornell. In college, Rutenberg competed in sprint football, a version of football which requires players to be under a certain weight and has an emphasis on speed and agility. He was a linebacker with the Cornell sprint football team.

== Coaching career ==
In 2003, Rutenberg began working for the Washington Redskins of the National Football League (NFL) as a player personnel intern. The following year, he received the position of administrative assistant to the head coach, Joe Gibbs, which he held through 2005. In that role, he was Gibbs' "right-hand man, putting together the team's daily calendar, practice schedules and meeting presentations, [and working] hand-in-hand with Gibbs to research opponents from a statistical standpoint," according to USA Today. During his stint with the Redskins, Rutenberg was also involved in organizing free agent workouts and worked on the team's computer scouting systems.

In 2006, Rutenberg became a graduate assistant working with the defense for the UCLA Bruins. He helped run the scout team defense and developed defensive gameplans with the Bruins. After three years at UCLA, he became the passing game coordinator and defensive backs coach for the New Mexico State Aggies in 2009. According to USA Today, Rutenberg's salary at New Mexico State was $30,000, tied with Marty Humphrey of Louisiana–Monroe as the lowest salary among all coaches at the NCAA Division I FBS level. He served four years at New Mexico State, mentoring future NFL cornerback Davon House, before joining the Jacksonville Jaguars in 2013 as assistant defensive backs coach.

Rutenberg served as assistant defensive backs coach for the Jaguars from 2013 to 2015, then became a defensive assistant in 2016. After holding that title for two years, he finished his stint with the Jaguars as assistant linebackers coach from 2018 to 2019. In 2020, he joined the San Francisco 49ers as pass game specialist, working under Robert Saleh, who had also previously been on the Jaguars staff. After one year there, he followed Saleh to the New York Jets and became the team's linebackers coach. Rutenberg worked four years in that position, helping the team's defense rank top five in the league in total defense in three of those years. After the 2024 season, he left the Jets and became the defensive pass game coordinator for the Atlanta Falcons. In 2026, he was one of the coaches interviewed by the Tennessee Titans as a defensive coordinator candidate.

On February 20, 2026, Rutenberg was hired as the defensive coordinator for the Cleveland Browns under new head coach Todd Monken.
