= Timpview High School =

Location
- 3570 Timpview Drive; Provo, Utah 84604; United States; 40°16′51″N 111°38′51″W

Information
- Type: Public
- Principal: Momi Tuua
- Teaching staff: 92.78 (FTE)
- Grades: 9–12
- Enrollment: 2,300 (2024–2025)
- Student to teacher ratio: 24.79
- Colors: Orange, blue and white
- Team name: Thunderbirds
- Newspaper: Thunderbolt
- Website: timpview.provo.edu

Exterior of auditorium with Mt. Timpanogos in the background

Timpview High School (THS) is a public secondary school located in Provo, Utah, United States. It is a 5A school and is one of the three high schools in the Provo City School District. The principal is Momi Tu'ua.

== Academics ==
Advanced Placement classes offered at Timpview High School include AP Art History, AP Studio Art Drawing, AP Biology, AP Calculus AB, AP Calculus BC, AP Chemistry, AP Chinese Language and Culture, AP Computer Science, AP English Language and Composition, AP English Literature and Composition, AP Environmental Science, AP French Language, AP German Language, AP Human Geography, AP Music Theory, AP Physics 1: Algebra Based, AP Precalculus, AP Psychology, AP Research, AP Seminar, AP Spanish Language, AP Statistics, AP US History, AP US Government and Politics, and AP World History. Timpview is also the only public school in Utah to teach a linear algebra class.

=== Concurrent enrollment ===
As of 2015, Timpview High School offered 128 concurrent enrollment courses through Utah Valley University. In addition, most students take concurrent enrollment classes at Brigham Young University, two miles away.

== Athletics ==
Timpview's athletic program offers participation in 11 competitive sports: lacrosse, baseball, basketball, football, golf, swimming, soccer, tennis, track, wrestling, cross country, and volleyball. Timpview won the "All Sports Award" for the 4A classification in Utah for the 2008-2009 school year. As of 2009, the Timpview boys' tennis team had won seven consecutive 4A state tennis championships; its girls' swimming team had won three consecutive 4A championships. In 2008–09, Timpview won state championships in football, boys' track, and boys' cross country.

== Notable alumni ==
- Branden Steineckert, musician with punk rock band Rancid
- Bronson Kaufusi, football player in the National Football League (NFL)
- Dallas Reynolds, football player in the NFL
- Danny Southwick, professional football player in the Arena Football League
- Harvey Unga, football player in the NFL
- Jane Hedengren, track and field athlete
- Jenna Johnson, professional ballroom dancer, Dancing with the Stars contestant
- Jenna Kim Jones, comedian and podcaster
- Lindsay Arnold, professional ballroom dancer, Dancing with the Stars contestant
- Logan Fano, college football player for the Utah Utes
- Matt Reynolds, football player in the NFL
- Mike Affleck, professional football player in the Arena Football League
- Mike Lee, United States Senator from Utah
- Pita Taumoepenu, football player in the NFL
- Raider Damuni, college football safety for the BYU Cougars
- Rylee Arnold, professional ballroom dancer, Dancing with the Stars contestant
- Samson Nacua, football player in the NFL
- Spencer Fano, football player for the Cleveland Browns
- Stephen Paea, football player in the NFL
- Xavier Su'a-Filo, football player in the NFL
