= Austin Barber =

American football player (born 2003)

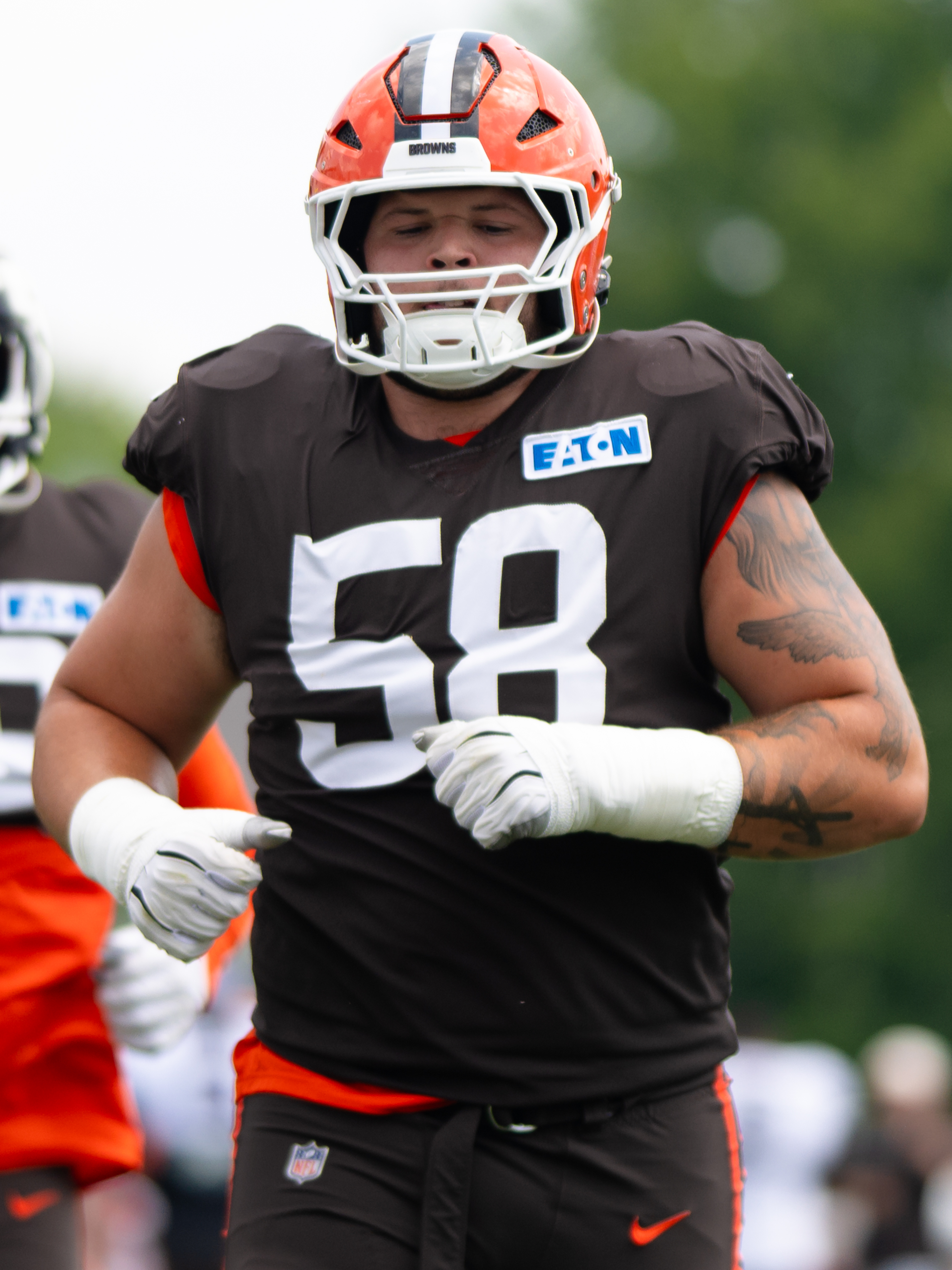
- Barber with the Cleveland Browns in 2026

No. 58 – Cleveland Browns
- Position: Offensive tackle
- Roster status: Active

Personal information
- Born: May 20, 2003 (age 23)
- Listed height: 6 ft 7 in (2.01 m)
- Listed weight: 320 lb (145 kg)

Career information
- High school: Trinity Christian Academy (Jacksonville)
- College: Florida (2021–2025)
- NFL draft: 2026: 3rd round, 86th overall pick

Career history
- Cleveland Browns (2026–present)

Awards and highlights
- Third-team All-SEC (2025)

Career NFL statistics as of Week 4, 2026
- Games played: 4
- Games started: 4
- Stats at Pro Football Reference

Austin Barber (born May 20, 2003) is an American professional football offensive guard for the Cleveland Browns of the National Football League (NFL). He played college football for the Florida Gators and was selected by the Browns in the third round of the 2026 NFL draft.

== Early life ==
Barber is from Jacksonville, Florida. He attended Trinity Christian Academy in Jacksonville, Florida, where he played football and basketball. An offensive lineman in football, he was named to the Florida Times-Union Super 11 team as a senior, helping his team win 12 straight games that year while defeating Chaminade–Madonna College Preparatory School 25–22 in the Class 3A championship. Barber also helped Trinity Christian post 2,127 rushing yards that season. He initially committed to play college football for the Minnesota Golden Gophers before de-committing. In December 2020, a day after winning the state title, he committed to play for the Florida Gators. He was ranked a four-star recruit in the class of 2021.

== College career ==
Barber redshirted in 2021 as a true freshman at Florida, appearing in three games. He then played in all 13 games in 2022, five as a starter, earning selection to the College Football News Freshman All-America team. He started eight games in 2023 while battling several injuries. In 2024, Barber started all 12 games at left tackle. He started all 12 games again as a senior in 2025, earning third-team All-Southeastern Conference (SEC) honors. At the conclusion of his collegiate career, he received an invite to the 2026 Senior Bowl.

== Professional career ==
Pre-draft measurables
Height	Weight	Arm length	Hand span	Wingspan	40-yard dash	10-yard split	20-yard split	Vertical jump	Broad jump
6 ft 6 7/8 in (2.00 m)	318 lb (144 kg)	33 1/8 in (0.84 m)	9 5/8 in (0.24 m)	6 ft 8 1/4 in (2.04 m)	5.12 s	1.77 s	2.95 s	32.0 in (0.81 m)	9 ft 3 in (2.82 m)
All values from NFL Combine

Barber was selected by the Cleveland Browns in the third round, 86th overall, of the 2026 NFL draft. Cleveland received the selection from the Los Angeles Chargers in exchange for the 105th and 145th selections (both originally owned by the New York Giants, received by the Browns for the 74th pick (Malachi Fields)), as well as the 206th selection.
