= Tenny Palepoi =

American football player (born 1990)

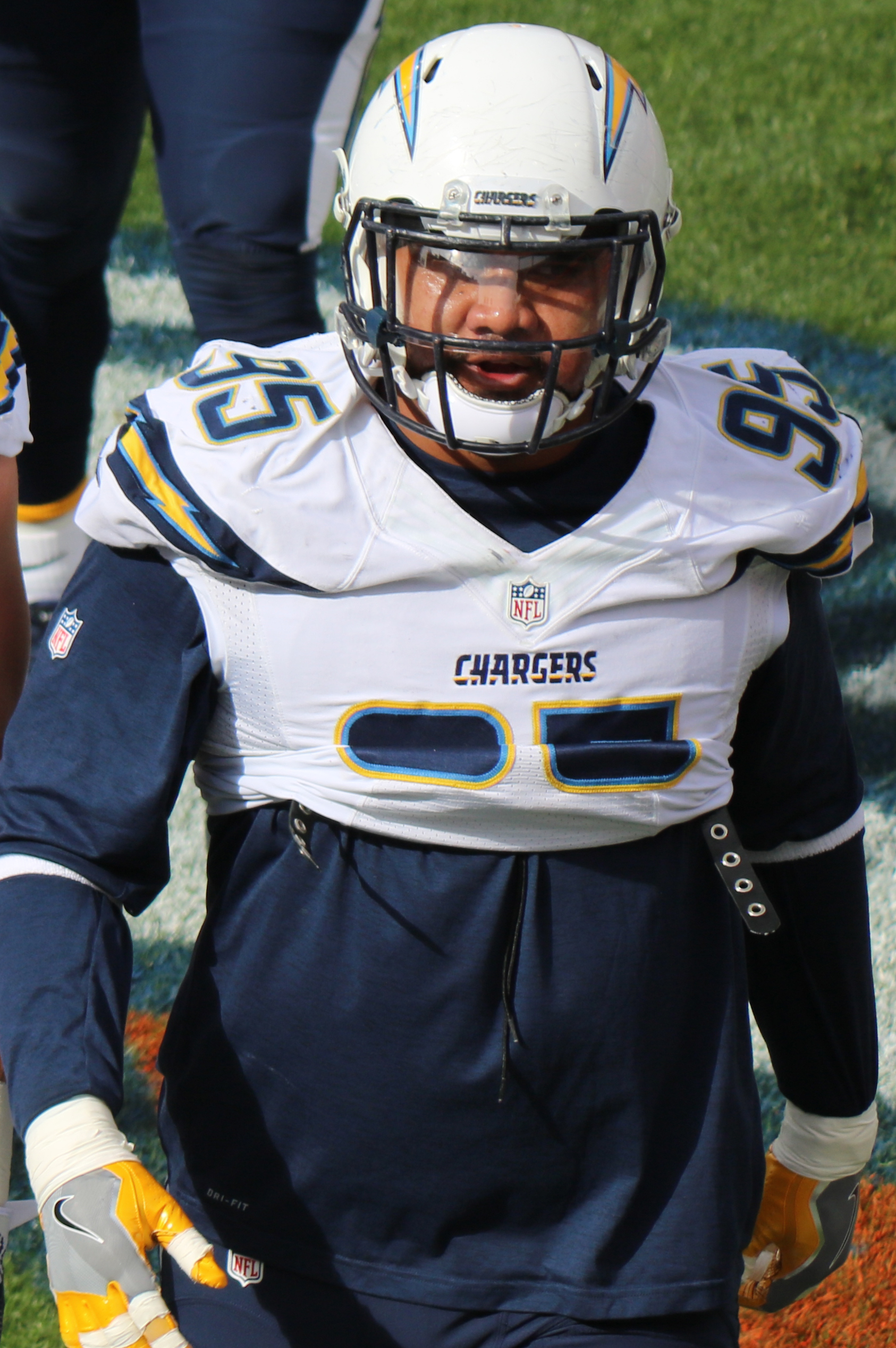
- Palepoi with the San Diego Chargers in 2016

No. 72, 95
- Position: Defensive tackle

Personal information
- Born: December 19, 1990 (age 35); Salt Lake City, Utah, U.S.
- Listed height: 6 ft 1 in (1.85 m)
- Listed weight: 298 lb (135 kg)

Career information
- High school: Skyline (Millcreek, Utah)
- College: Snow (2009–2011); Utah (2012–2013)
- NFL draft: 2014: undrafted

Career history
- San Diego / Los Angeles Chargers (2014–2017); Buffalo Bills (2018)*; Salt Lake Stallions (2019)
- * Offseason or practice squad member only

Awards and highlights
- Second-team All-Pac-12 (2013)

Career NFL statistics
- Total tackles: 53
- Sacks: 1
- Fumble recoveries: 1
- Stats at Pro Football Reference

Tenny Tatoi Palepoi (born December 19, 1990) is an American former professional football player who was a defensive tackle in the National Football League (NFL). He enrolled at Snow College before transferring and playing college football for the Utah Utes. His older brother, Anton Palepoi, also played in the NFL.

== Early life ==
Palepoi was born on December 19, 1990, in Salt Lake City, Utah. He played high school football at Skyline High School in Holladay, Utah. He first-team all-state in 2008 as a senior and honorable mention all-state in 2007. He was also team captain and an all-region selection his junior and senior years.

== College career ==
Palepoi played for the Snow College Badgers from 2010 to 2011. He was a NJCAA All-American, first-team All-WSFL selection, and team captain his sophomore year in 2011.

Palepoi transferred and played football for the Utah Utes of the University of Utah from 2012 to 2013. He was a second-team All-Pac-12 selection and team captain his senior year. He recorded 74 tackles, 12.5 tackles for loss and 6.5 sacks at the University of Utah.

== Professional career ==
Pre-draft measurables
Height	Weight	Arm length	Hand span	Wingspan	40-yard dash	10-yard split	20-yard split	20-yard shuttle	Three-cone drill	Vertical jump	Broad jump	Bench press
6 ft 1 1/2 in (1.87 m)	298 lb (135 kg)	30 1/2 in (0.77 m)	9 7/8 in (0.25 m)	6 ft 3 5/8 in (1.92 m)	5.10 s	1.77 s	2.95 s	4.53 s	7.51 s	30.5 in (0.77 m)	9 ft 3 in (2.82 m)	31 reps
All values from NFL Combine/Pro Day

=== San Diego / Los Angeles Chargers ===
Palepoi was signed by the San Diego Chargers on May 13, 2014, after going undrafted in the 2014 NFL draft. He made his NFL debut on September 8, 2014, against the Arizona Cardinals, recording one tackle. He was ruled out for the 2015 season with a fractured foot on August 3, 2015.

Palepoi was suspended four games on December 12, 2016, for violating the NFL policy on performance-enhancing substances.

On March 20, 2017, Palepoi re-signed with the Chargers.

=== Buffalo Bills ===
On April 16, 2018, Palepoi signed a one-year contract with the Buffalo Bills. He was released on July 25, 2018. He was re-signed on August 19, 2018, only to be released four days later.

=== Salt Lake Stallions ===
On December 22, 2018, Palepoi signed with the Salt Lake Stallions of the Alliance of American Football. The league ceased operations in April 2019.

In the 2020 XFL draft, Palepoi was selected by the Seattle Dragons.
