= Anton Palepoi =

American Samoan gridiron football player (born 1978)

No. 91, 95, 70
- Position: Defensive end

Personal information
- Born: January 19, 1978 (age 48); American Samoa
- Listed height: 6 ft 3 in (1.91 m)
- Listed weight: 283 lb (128 kg)

Career information
- High school: Hunter (West Valley City, Utah, U.S.)
- College: UNLV
- NFL draft: 2002: 2nd round, 60th overall pick

Career history
- Seattle Seahawks (2002–2004); Denver Broncos (2004); Arizona Cardinals (2005); New Orleans Saints (2007)*
- * Offseason or practice squad member only

Awards and highlights
- First-team All-MW (2000); Second-team All-MW (2001)

Career NFL statistics
- Total tackles: 45
- Sacks: 4
- Passes defended: 2
- Stats at Pro Football Reference

Anton Charles Palepoi (born January 19, 1978) is an American Samoan former professional player of American football who was a defensive end for five seasons in the National Football League (NFL). He played college football for the UNLV Rebels. Selected by the Seattle Seahawks in the second round of the 2002 NFL draft, he played for the team from 2002 to 2004.

== Early life ==
Palepoi attended high school at Hunter High School in West Valley City, Utah, where he played basketball and football for the Wolverines. Taking the junior college route, he went on to attend Dixie College, where he was named Western States Football League Most Valuable Player in 1999 after leading the Red Storm to an appearance in the junior college national championship game.

Recruited by Ken Niumatalolo, he chose Nevada–Las Vegas over Utah. Palepoi was an All-Mountain West Conference selection in both of his years at UNLV, despite having his senior season cut short to only six games.

== Professional career ==
Despite being projected as an undrafted free agent, Palepoi was selected in the second round, 60th overall, by the Seattle Seahawks. He was the highest selected player from UNLV since Ickey Woods in 1988.

Pre-draft measurables
Height	Weight	Arm length	Hand span	40-yard dash	10-yard split	20-yard split	20-yard shuttle	Three-cone drill	Vertical jump	Broad jump	Bench press
6 ft 3 1/4 in (1.91 m)	279 lb (127 kg)	33 in (0.84 m)	8 in (0.20 m)	4.81 s	1.69 s	2.83 s	4.27 s	7.46 s	33.5 in (0.85 m)	9 ft 6 in (2.90 m)	24 reps
All values from NFL Combine

He played for the Seattle Seahawks, Denver Broncos, and Arizona Cardinals, before signing with the New Orleans Saints in May 2007.

== Personal life ==
Palepoi was born to Tony and Tutaga Palepoi, both Brigham Young University graduates. His father played for the Samoa national rugby union team. His younger brother Tenny Palepoi was a defensive lineman for the San Diego Chargers.

Also had a small appearance in the movie Wish Upon a Star starring Katherine Heigl which was filmed at Hunter High School.
