= Gabe Reid =

American football player (born 1977)

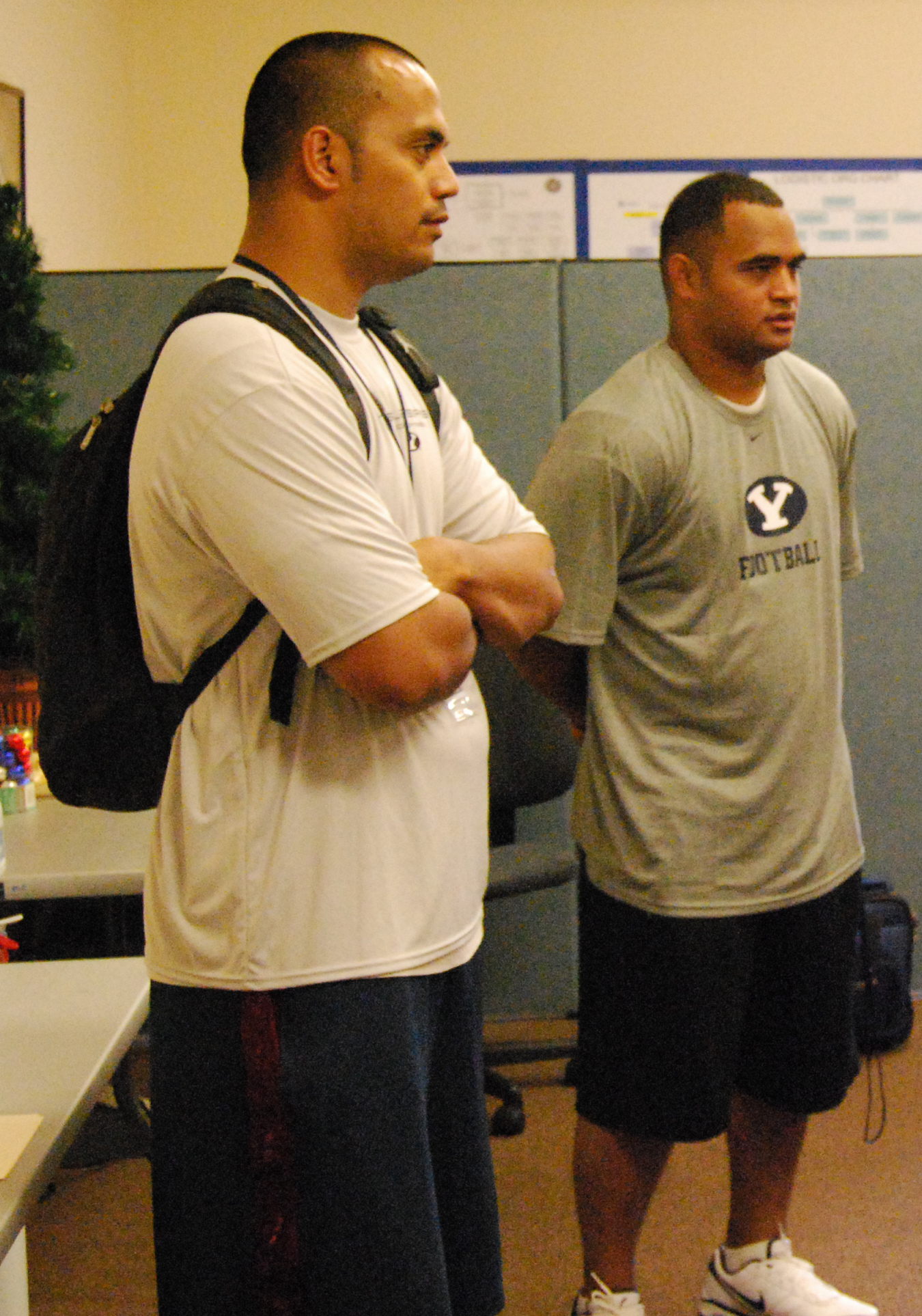
- Reid (left) with Reno Mahe in 2009

No. 48, 82
- Positions: Tight end, fullback

Personal information
- Born: May 28, 1977 (age 49); Pago Pago, American Samoa
- Listed height: 6 ft 3 in (1.91 m)
- Listed weight: 253 lb (115 kg)

Career information
- High school: Leone
- College: BYU
- NFL draft: 2003: undrafted

Career history
- New York Jets (2003)*; Tennessee Titans (2003)*; Chicago Bears (2003–2006)
- * Offseason or practice squad member only

Career NFL statistics
- Receptions: 7
- Receiving yards: 57
- Stats at Pro Football Reference

Gabriel Reid (born May 28, 1977) is a former American football tight end for the Chicago Bears in the National Football League (NFL). He was signed as an undrafted free agent out of Brigham Young University (BYU).

== Football career ==
Reid played high school football at Leone High School in Leone, American Samoa and followed older brother, Spencer, to BYU. Spencer was the first graduate from an American Samoan high school to play in the NFL, playing for the Carolina Panthers (1998) and Indianapolis Colts (1999).

== Professional career ==
Pre-draft measurables
Height	Weight	Arm length	Hand span	40-yard dash	10-yard split	20-yard split	20-yard shuttle	Three-cone drill	Vertical jump	Broad jump	Bench press
6 ft 3 3/8 in (1.91 m)	255 lb (116 kg)	31 3/4 in (0.81 m)	9 3/4 in (0.25 m)	4.83 s	1.66 s	2.79 s	4.32 s	7.49 s	37.0 in (0.94 m)	9 ft 11 in (3.02 m)	23 reps
All values from NFL Combine

After not being selected in the 2003 NFL draft, Reid signed with the Chicago Bears. Late in the 2006 season, Bears head coach Lovie Smith converted Reid into a fullback after starter Jason McKie injured his ankle. He fumbled a kickoff return in Super Bowl XLI at his 35-yard line with Colts player Tyjuan Hagler recovering. On the very next play, the Colts fumbled the ball back and the Bears scored on the subsequent drive. Reid became a restricted free agent after the season, but was not offered an extension and did not return to the Bears.

His four-year NFL career ended with seven receptions for 57 yards and no touchdowns.

== Personal life ==
Reid is a husband and a father of four children, three girls and one boy. He is a member of the Church of Jesus Christ of Latter-day Saints, and has been the second counselor in the Sunday School general presidency since April 6, 2024.
