= 2024 Tennessee Titans season =

65th season in franchise history

- Owner: KSA Industries
- General manager: Ran Carthon
- Head coach: Brian Callahan
- Home stadium: Nissan Stadium

Results
- Record: 3–14
- Division place: 4th AFC South
- Playoffs: Did not qualify
- Pro Bowlers: DT Jeffery Simmons

Uniform
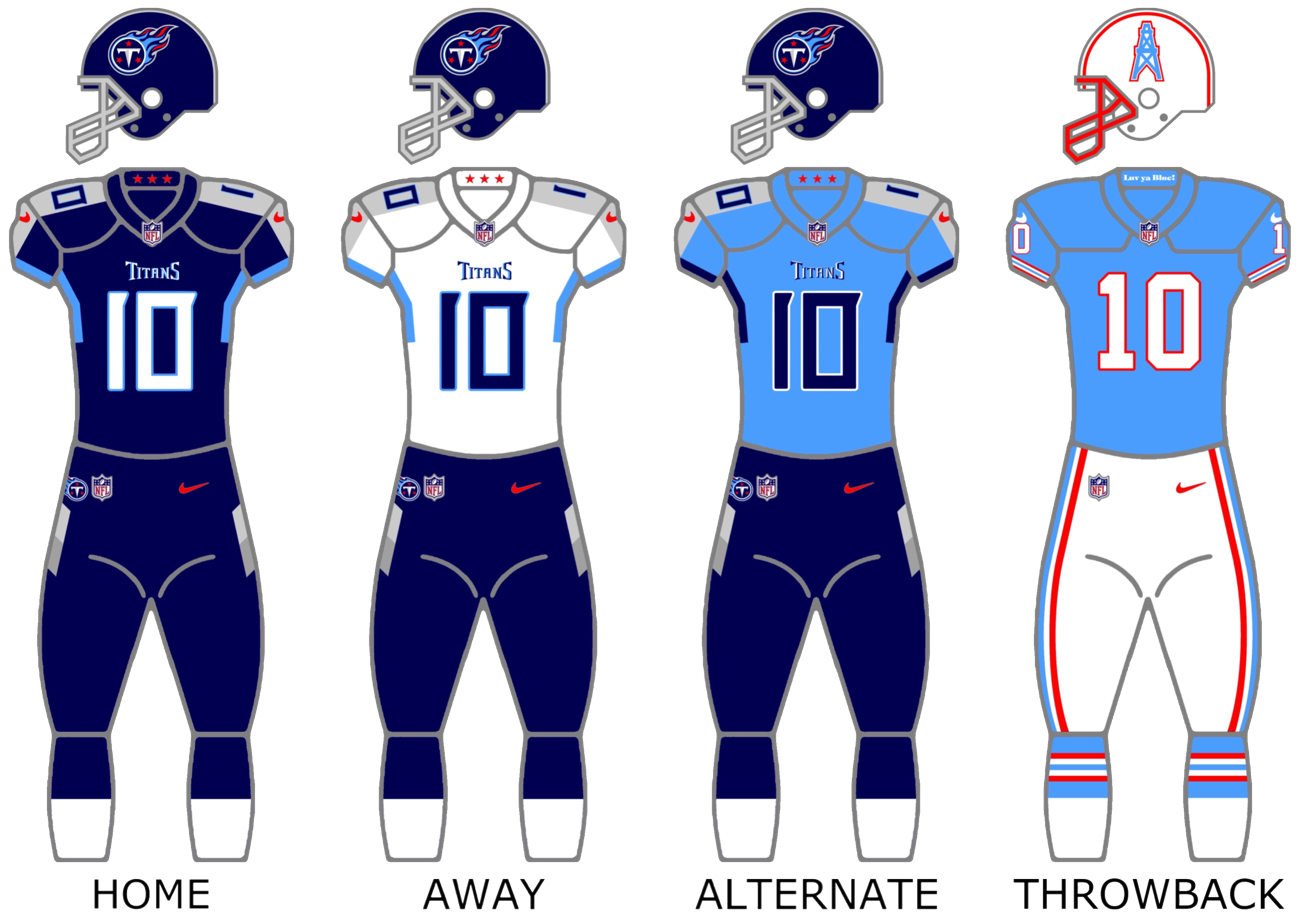

The 2024 season was the Tennessee Titans' 55th in the National Football League (NFL), their 65th overall, their 28th in the state of Tennessee, their second and final under general manager Ran Carthon, and their only full season under head coach Brian Callahan. The Titans' 1–6 record to start the season was their worst start since 2015. The team was eliminated from playoff contention for the third consecutive season after losing to the Jacksonville Jaguars 10–6 in Week 14. They failed to improve on their 6–11 record from the previous season after losing to the Cincinnati Bengals 37–27 in Week 15. The Titans ended the season with a record of 3–14 after losing to the Houston Texans 23–14 in Week 18, their lowest win count since 2015 and their most losses since 2014. The Week 18 loss also secured the Titans the first overall pick in the 2025 NFL draft. This season was also the first since 2014 where no Titans players were named to the initial AFC roster for the Pro Bowl.

This was the Titans' first season since 2015 without long-time running back Derrick Henry, who was not re-signed in the offseason and joined the Baltimore Ravens in free agency. Quarterback Will Levis started the majority of games throughout the season (12), but also shared starts with Mason Rudolph (5) due to injuries and performance issues.

== Offseason ==
=== Coaching changes ===
On January 9, 2024, the Titans fired head coach Mike Vrabel after six seasons and a career record of 56–48 with the team. Vrabel had lost 18 out of the past 24 games dating back to the 2022 season and hadn't won a playoff game since the 2019 season. However, many still saw the move as a surprise and believed Vrabel to be a popular head coaching candidate for other teams.

On January 24, 2024 the Titans hired Cincinnati Bengals offensive coordinator Brian Callahan as their new head coach.

=== Roster changes ===
2024 Tennessee Titans trades
Team	Compensation	Received
Kansas City Chiefs	7th round selection 2024 NFL draft 3rd round selection 2025 NFL draft	CB L'Jarius Sneed; 7th round selection 2024 NFL draft
Kansas City Chiefs	WR DeAndre Hopkins	Conditional 4th or 5th round selection 2025 NFL draft

==== Reserve/futures free agent contracts ====
On January 8, 2024, the Titans signed six players from their practice squad to reserve/futures contracts.

Player	Position
Shyheim Carter	CB
Tay Gowan	CB
Tre'Shaun Harrison	WR
Thomas Odukoya	TE
Thomas Rush	LB
Lachavious Simmons	G

== Draft ==
2024 Tennessee Titans draft selections
Round	Selection	Player	Position	College	Notes
1	7	JC Latham	OT	Alabama	
2	38	T'Vondre Sweat	DT	Texas	
3	71	Traded to the Arizona Cardinals (Note: The Titans traded a third-round selection (71st overall), and 2023 second- and third-round selections (41st and 72nd overall) to the Arizona Cardinals in exchange for 2023 second- and third-round selections (33rd and 81st overall).)			
4	106	Cedric Gray	LB	North Carolina	
5	142	Traded to the Carolina Panthers (Note: The Titans traded a fifth-round selection (142nd overall) to the Carolina Panthers in exchange for a seventh-round selection (221st overall) and OT Dennis Daley.)			
5	146	Jarvis Brownlee Jr.	CB	Louisville	From Vikings via Eagles (Note: The Titans traded S Kevin Byard to the Philadelphia Eagles in exchange for fifth- and sixth-round selections (146th and 182nd overall) and S Terrell Edmunds.)
6	182	Jha'Quan Jackson	WR	Tulane	From Titans (Note: The Titans traded a sixth-round selection (182nd overall) to the Philadelphia Eagles in exchange for a seventh-round selection (242nd overall) and S Ugo Amadi.) via Eagles
7	221	Traded to the Kansas City Chiefs (Note: The Titans traded a seventh-round selection (221st overall) and a 2025 third-round selection to the Kansas City Chiefs in exchange for a seventh-round selection (252nd overall) and CB L'Jarius Sneed.)			From Panthers
7	227	Traded to the Cleveland Browns (Note: The Titans traded a seventh-round selection (227th overall) to the Cleveland Browns in exchange for OT Leroy Watson IV.)			
7	242	James Williams	S	Miami (FL)	From Eagles
7	252	Jaylen Harrell	DE	Michigan	From Chiefs

2024 Tennessee Titans undrafted free agents
Name	Position	College	Ref.
Brian Dooley	OT	Eastern Michigan	
Khalid Duke	DE	Kansas State	
Keaton Ellis	S	Penn State	
X'Zauvea Gadlin	OT	Liberty	
Rod Gattison	CB	Western Carolina	
Isaiah Iton	DT	Rutgers	
Robert Javier	CB	Towson	
Gabe Jeudy-Lally	CB	Tennessee	
Dillon Johnson	RB	Washington	
David Martin-Robinson	TE	Temple	
Brayden Narveson	K	NC State	
Bryce Oliver	WR	Youngstown State	
Sam Schnee	WR	Northern Iowa	
Jabari Small	RB	Tennessee	
Cole Spencer	G	Texas Tech	
Steven Stilianos	TE	Iowa	

Draft trades

== Staff ==
2024 Tennessee Titans staff
Front office: Owner – KSA Industries; Controlling owner – Amy Adams Strunk; President/CEO – Burke Nihill; Executive vice president/general manager – Ran Carthon; President of football operations – Chad Brinker; Assistant general manager – Anthony Robinson; Vice president of football administration – Vin Marino; Director, scouting – AJ Highsmith; Director of college scouting – Jon Salge; Assistant director of college scouting – Dale Thompson; Director of pro scouting – Brian Gardner; Assistant director of pro scouting – Kevin Turks; Director, football research and development – Sarah Bailey; Assistant director of football strategy – Rob Riederer; Head coaches: Head coach – Brian Callahan; Offensive coaches: Offensive coordinator – Nick Holz; Quarterbacks – Bo Hardegree; Running backs – Randy Jordan; Wide receivers – Tyke Tolbert; Assistant wide receivers – Payton McCollum; Tight ends – Justin Outten; Assistant tight ends – Luke Stocker; Offensive line – Bill Callahan; Assistant offensive line – Scott Fuchs; Offensive assistant – Kylan Butler; Offensive assistant – Matt Jones	Defensive coaches: Defensive coordinator – Dennard Wilson; Defensive line – Tracy Rocker; Assistant defensive line/pass rush specialist – Clinton McMillan; Linebackers – Frank Bush; Outside linebackers – Ben Bloom; Passing game coordinator/cornerbacks – Chris Harris; Secondary/safeties − Steve Jackson; Defensive quality control – Lori Locust; Defensive assistant – Steve Donatell; Special teams coaches: Special teams coordinator – Colt Anderson; Assistant special teams – Anthony Levine; Assistant to the head coach – Tom Jones; Strength and conditioning: Director of sports performance – Zac Woodfin; Assistant director of sports performance – Brian Bell; Assistant strength and conditioning – Mark Lovat; Assistant strength and conditioning – Grant Thorne; Sports performance assistant – Haley Roberts; Assistant sports performance: speed training – John Shaw

== Final roster ==
2024 Tennessee Titans roster
Quarterbacks (QB): 8 Will Levis; 11 Mason Rudolph; Running backs (RB): 36 Julius Chestnut; 25 Joshua Kelley; 20 Tony Pollard; 2 Tyjae Spears; Wide receivers (WR): 83 Tyler Boyd; 19 Jha'Quan Jackson; 12 Mason Kinsey; 18 Tay Martin; 80 Bryce Oliver; 0 Calvin Ridley; 15 Nick Westbrook-Ikhine; Tight ends (TE): 88 David Martin-Robinson; 85 Chig Okonkwo; 84 Nick Vannett; 81 Josh Whyle	Offensive linemen (OL): 60 Daniel Brunskill C; 71 Jaelyn Duncan LT; 64 Arlington Hambright G; 55 JC Latham LT; 62 Corey Levin C; 61 John Ojukwu LT; 78 Nicholas Petit-Frere RT; 75 Dillon Radunz RG; 77 Peter Skoronski LG; Defensive linemen (DL): 91 Keondre Coburn DE; 69 Sebastian Joseph-Day DE; 97 James Lynch DE; 98 Jeffery Simmons DT; 93 T'Vondre Sweat NT	Linebackers (LB): 17 Jerome Baker ILB; 47 Khalid Duke OLB; 99 Ali Gaye OLB; 57 Luke Gifford ILB; 51 Cedric Gray ILB; 92 Jaylen Harrell OLB; 49 Arden Key OLB; 58 Harold Landry OLB; 42 Raekwon McMillan ILB; 52 James Williams ILB; Defensive backs (DB): 13 Chidobe Awuzie CB; 39 Darrell Baker Jr. CB; 30 Kendell Brooks FS; 44 Mike Brown FS; 29 Jarvis Brownlee Jr. CB; 26 Justin Hardee CB; 37 Amani Hooker SS; 21 Roger McCreary CB; 35 Daryl Worley CB; Special teams (ST): 46 Morgan Cox LS; 6 Nick Folk K; 4 Ryan Stonehouse P	Practice squad: 73 McTelvin Agim NT; 94 Abdullah Anderson DE; 53 Curtis Bolton ILB; 67 Chandler Brewer RT; 95 Isaiah Iton DE; 32 Gabe Jeudy-Lally CB; 59 Kyron Johnson ILB; 82 Stanley Morgan Jr. WR; 89 Thomas Odukoya TE (Int.); 33 Gervarrius Owens S; 68 Isaiah Prince RT; 3 Trevor Siemian QB; 31 Jabari Small RB; 7 Matthew Wright K; Reserve: 66 Logan Bruss G (IR); 16 Treylon Burks WR (IR); 45 Chance Campbell ILB (IR); 79 Lloyd Cushenberry C (IR); 90 Marlon Davidson DT (IR); 28 Quandre Diggs FS (IR); 14 Colton Dowell WR (PUP); 50 Jack Gibbens ILB (IR); 96 T. K. McLendon DE (IR); 56 Kenneth Murray ILB (IR); 41 Otis Reese ILB (IR); 76 Andrew Rupcich G (IR); 38 L'Jarius Sneed CB (IR); 54 Garret Wallow ILB (IR); 24 Julius Wood SS (Susp.); Rookies in italics 53 active, 15 reserve, 13 practice squad (1 exempt)

=== Team captains ===
- Will Levis (QB)
- Jeffery Simmons (DE)
- Lloyd Cushenberry (C)
- Kenneth Murray (LB)
- Morgan Cox (LS)

== Preseason ==
Week	Date	Opponent	Result	Record	Venue	Recap
1	August 10	San Francisco 49ers	W 17–13	1–0	Nissan Stadium	Recap
2	August 17	Seattle Seahawks	W 16–15	2–0	Nissan Stadium	Recap
3	August 25	at New Orleans Saints	W 30–27	3–0	Caesars Superdome	Recap

== Regular season ==
=== Schedule ===
Week	Date	Opponent	Result	Record	Venue	Recap
1	September 8	at Chicago Bears	**L** 17–24	0–1	Soldier Field	Recap
2	September 15	New York Jets	**L** 17–24	0–2	Nissan Stadium	Recap
3	September 22	Green Bay Packers	**L** 14–30	0–3	Nissan Stadium	Recap
4	September 30	at Miami Dolphins	**W** 31–12	1–3	Hard Rock Stadium	Recap
5	Bye					
6	October 13	**Indianapolis Colts**	**L** 17–20	1–4	Nissan Stadium	Recap
7	October 20	at Buffalo Bills	**L** 10–34	1–5	Highmark Stadium	Recap
8	October 27	at Detroit Lions	**L** 14–52	1–6	Ford Field	Recap
9	November 3	New England Patriots	**W** 20–17 (OT)	2–6	Nissan Stadium	Recap
10	November 10	at Los Angeles Chargers	**L** 17–27	2–7	SoFi Stadium	Recap
11	November 17	Minnesota Vikings	**L** 13–23	2–8	Nissan Stadium	Recap
12	November 24	at **Houston Texans**	**W** 32–27	3–8	NRG Stadium	Recap
13	December 1	at Washington Commanders	**L** 19–42	3–9	Northwest Stadium	Recap
14	December 8	**Jacksonville Jaguars**	**L** 6–10	3–10	Nissan Stadium	Recap
15	December 15	Cincinnati Bengals	**L** 27–37	3–11	Nissan Stadium	Recap
16	December 22	at **Indianapolis Colts**	**L** 30–38	3–12	Lucas Oil Stadium	Recap
17	December 29	at **Jacksonville Jaguars**	**L** 13–20	3–13	EverBank Stadium	Recap
18	January 5	**Houston Texans**	**L** 14–23	3–14	Nissan Stadium	Recap

Note: Intra-division opponents are in bold text.

=== Game summaries ===
==== Week 1: at Chicago Bears ====
Week 1: Tennessee Titans at Chicago Bears – Game summary

Quarter	1	2	3	4	Total
Titans	7	10	0	0	**17**
**Bears**	0	3	7	14	**24**

at Soldier Field, Chicago, Illinois

- Date: September 8
- Game time: 12:00 p.m. CDT
- Game weather: Mostly sunny, 67 °F (19 °C)
- Game attendance: 59,403
- Referee: Shawn Smith
- TV announcers (Fox): Adam Amin, Mark Sanchez, and Kristina Pink
- Recap, Game Book

Game information

**First quarter**

- TEN – Tony Pollard 26-yard run (Nick Folk kick), 0:41. Titans 7–0. **Drive: 8 plays, 79 yards, 4:45.**

**Second quarter**

- TEN – Nick Folk 40-yard field goal, 14:06. Titans 10–0. **Drive: 4 plays, 1 yard, 1:35.**
- TEN – Chig Okonkwo 17-yard pass from Will Levis (Nick Folk kick), 3:44. Titans 17–0. **Drive: 14 plays, 73 yards, 8:23.**
- CHI – Cairo Santos 24-yard field goal, 0:27. Titans 17–3. **Drive: 9 plays, 28 yards, 3:17.**

**Third quarter**

- CHI – Jonathan Owens 21-yard return of blocked punt (Cairo Santos kick), 9:07. Titans 17–10. **Drive: 6 plays, 8 yards, 3:19.**

**Fourth quarter**

- CHI – Cairo Santos 50-yard field goal, 14:47. Titans 17–13. **Drive: 11 plays, 44 yards, 3:59.**
- CHI – Cairo Santos 48-yard field goal, 9:52. Titans 17–16. **Drive: 4 plays, 1 yard, 1:52.**
- CHI – Tyrique Stevenson 43-yard interception return (Caleb Williams–D'Andre Swift pass), 7:35. Bears 24–17. **Drive: 4 plays, 15 yards, 2:17.**

**Top passers**

- TEN – Will Levis – 19/32, 127 yards, TD, 2 INT
- CHI – Caleb Williams – 14/29, 93 yards

**Top rushers**

- TEN – Tony Pollard – 16 rushes, 82 yards, TD
- CHI – D'Andre Swift – 10 rushes, 30 yards

**Top receivers**

- TEN – Calvin Ridley – 3 receptions, 50 yards
- CHI – D. J. Moore – 5 receptions, 36 yards

The Titans defense played an outstanding game, holding the Bears to just 148 yards of offense and no touchdowns; however, the Titans blew a 17–0 lead after giving up a blocked punt for a touchdown and quarterback Will Levis throwing a go-ahead pick six in the fourth quarter. With the loss, the Titans fall to 0–1 and lose their third straight season opener.

==== Week 2: vs. New York Jets ====
Week 2: New York Jets at Tennessee Titans – Game summary

Quarter	1	2	3	4	Total
**Jets**	0	7	10	7	**24**
Titans	7	3	7	0	**17**

at Nissan Stadium, Nashville, Tennessee

- Date: September 15
- Game time: 12:00 p.m. CDT
- Game weather: Cloudy, 80 °F (27 °C)
- Game attendance: 65,509
- Referee: Alan Eck
- TV announcers (CBS): Ian Eagle, Charles Davis, and Evan Washburn
- Recap, Game Book

Game information

**First quarter**

- TEN – Calvin Ridley 10-yard run (Nick Folk kick), 2:30. Titans 7–0. **Drive: 9 plays, 68 yards, 6:38.**

**Second quarter**

- NYJ – Braelon Allen 12-yard pass from Aaron Rodgers (Greg Zuerlein kick), 1:47. Tied 7–7. **Drive: 12 plays, 73 yards, 5:05.**
- TEN – Nick Folk 41-yard field goal, 0:00. Titans 10–7. **Drive: 8 plays, 51 yards, 1:47.**

**Third quarter**

- NYJ – Breece Hall 26-yard pass from Aaron Rodgers (Greg Zuerlein kick), 12:08. Jets 14–10. **Drive: 5 plays, 70 yards, 2:52.**
- NYJ – Greg Zuerlein 33-yard field goal, 5:58. Jets 17–10. **Drive: 6 plays, 15 yards, 2:17.**
- TEN – Calvin Ridley 40-yard pass from Will Levis (Nick Folk kick), 3:22. Tied 17–17. **Drive: 5 plays, 71 yards, 2:36.**

**Fourth quarter**

- NYJ – Braelon Allen 20-yard run (Greg Zuerlein kick), 4:31. Jets 24–17. **Drive: 7 plays, 74 yards, 4:10.**

**Top passers**

- NYJ – Aaron Rodgers – 18/30, 176 yards, 2 TD
- TEN – Will Levis – 19/28, 192 yards, TD, INT

**Top rushers**

- NYJ – Breece Hall – 14 rushes, 62 yards
- TEN – Tony Pollard – 17 rushes, 62 yards

**Top receivers**

- NYJ – Garrett Wilson – 4 receptions, 57 yards
- TEN – Calvin Ridley – 4 receptions, 77 yards, TD

The Titans once again played a solid game on defense, but once again allowed a blocked punt and Will Levis continued to struggle with turnovers. With the loss, they fell to 0–2.

==== Week 3: vs. Green Bay Packers ====
Week 3: Green Bay Packers at Tennessee Titans – Game summary

Quarter	1	2	3	4	Total
**Packers**	17	3	7	3	**30**
Titans	7	0	7	0	**14**

at Nissan Stadium, Nashville, Tennessee

- Date: September 22
- Game time: 12:00 p.m. CDT
- Game weather: Cloudy, 87 °F (31 °C)
- Game attendance: 67,322
- Referee: Clay Martin
- TV announcers (Fox): Kevin Kugler, Daryl Johnston, and Laura Okmin
- Recap, Gsme Book

Game information

**First quarter**

- GB – Malik Willis 5-yard run (Brayden Narveson kick), 12:25. Packers 7–0. **Drive: 6 plays, 70 yards, 2:35.**
- TEN – Nick Vannett 1-yard pass from Will Levis (Nick Folk kick), 7:15. Tied 7–7. **Drive: 10 plays, 70 yards, 5:10.**
- GB – Brayden Narveson 21-yard field goal, 1:05. Packers 10–7. **Drive: 11 plays, 67 yards, 6:10.**
- GB – Jaire Alexander 35-yard interception return (Brayden Narveson kick), 0:51. Packers 17–7.

**Second quarter**

- GB – Brayden Narveson 26-yard field goal, 0:00. Packers 20–7. **Drive: 12 plays, 67 yards, 6:02.**

**Third quarter**

- GB – Emanuel Wilson 30-yard pass from Malik Willis (Brayden Narveson kick), 8:25. Packers 27–7. **Drive: 5 plays, 36 yards, 3:13.**
- TEN – DeAndre Hopkins 11-yard pass from Will Levis (Nick Folk kick), 4:55. Packers 27–14. **Drive: 7 plays, 68 yards, 3:30.**

**Fourth quarter**

- GB – Brayden Narveson 47-yard field goal, 3:29. Packers 30–14. **Drive: 8 plays, 31 yards, 3:11.**

**Top passers**

- GB – Malik Willis – 13/19, 202 yards, TD
- TEN – Will Levis – 26/34, 260 yards, 2 TD, 2 INT

**Top rushers**

- GB – Malik Willis – 6 rushes, 73 yards, TD
- TEN – Tony Pollard – 6 rushes, 14 yards

**Top receivers**

- GB – Christian Watson – 2 receptions, 67 yards
- TEN – DeAndre Hopkins – 6 receptions, 73 yards, TD

Facing their former quarterback Malik Willis, the Titans struggled, allowing Willis to throw for 202 yards and a touchdown while also rushing for 73 yards and a touchdown. Meanwhile, Will Levis was sacked 8 times and threw another pick-six, dropping the Titans to 0–3 for the first time since 2009.

==== Week 4: at Miami Dolphins ====
Week 4: Tennessee Titans at Miami Dolphins – Game summary

Quarter	1	2	3	4	Total
**Titans**	0	9	10	12	**31**
Dolphins	0	3	3	6	**12**

at Hard Rock Stadium, Miami Gardens, Florida

- Date: September 30
- Game time: 7:30 p.m. EDT/6:30 p.m. CDT
- Game weather: Partly cloudy, 86 °F (30 °C)
- Game attendance: 65,291
- Referee: Clete Blakeman
- TV announcers (WSMV/ESPN): Chris Fowler, Louis Riddick, Dan Orlovsky and Laura Rutledge
- Recap, Game Book

Game information

**First quarter**

- No scoring plays.

**Second quarter**

- TEN – Nick Folk 53-yard field goal, 14:16. Titans 3–0. **Drive: 9 plays, 21 yards, 4:58.**
- TEN – Nick Folk 52-yard field goal, 8:20. Titans 6–0. **Drive: 8 plays, 19 yards, 4:01.**
- MIA – Jason Sanders 44-yard field goal, 4:13. Titans 6–3. **Drive: 10 plays, 44 yards, 4:07.**
- TEN – Nick Folk 47-yard field goal, 0:00. Titans 9–3. **Drive: 3 plays, 27 yards, 0:16.**

**Third quarter**

- MIA – Jason Sanders 56-yard field goal, 9:02. Titans 9–6. **Drive: 5 plays, 10 yards, 2:38.**
- TEN – Tyjae Spears 7-yard run (Nick Folk kick), 6:00. Titans 16–6. **Drive: 5 plays, 70 yards, 3:02.**
- TEN – Nick Folk 51-yard field goal, 0:36. Titans 19–6. **Drive: 6 plays, 11 yards, 3:44.**

**Fourth quarter**

- TEN – Nick Folk 29-yard field goal, 10:45. Titans 22–6. **Drive: 8 plays, 27 yards, 3:23.**
- MIA – Tyler Huntley 1-yard run (pass failed), 3:36. Titans 22–12. **Drive: 11 plays, 70 yards, 7:09.**
- TEN – Penalty on Tyler Huntley enforced in the end zone for a safety, 2:27. Titans 24–12.
- TEN – Tony Pollard 4-yard run (Nick Folk kick), 0:24. Titans 31–12. **Drive: 4 plays, 10 yards, 2:03.**

**Top passers**

- TEN – Mason Rudolph – 9/17, 85 yards
- MIA – Tyler Huntley – 14/22, 96 yards

**Top rushers**

- TEN – Tony Pollard – 22 rushes, 88 yards, TD
- MIA – Tyler Huntley – 8 rushes, 40 yards, TD

**Top receivers**

- TEN – DeAndre Hopkins – 2 receptions, 31 yards
- MIA – Jaylen Waddle – 4 receptions, 36 yards

The Titans get their first win of the season, albeit against an injury-plagued Dolphins down to their third-string quarterback. Levis notably injured his shoulder on a scramble during the first quarter, resulting in the first appearance of Mason Rudolph. This was the first game where the Titans scored 30 or more points since the 2021 season, ending a multi-year drought. Kicker Nick Folk was also awarded AFC Special Teams Player of the Week after going five for five on field goals.

==== Week 6: vs. Indianapolis Colts ====
Week 6: Indianapolis Colts at Tennessee Titans – Game summary

Quarter	1	2	3	4	Total
**Colts**	7	3	0	10	**20**
Titans	7	3	7	0	**17**

at Nissan Stadium, Nashville, Tennessee

- Date: October 13
- Game time: 12:00 p.m. CDT
- Game weather: Sunny, 76 °F (24 °C)
- Game attendance: 64,302
- Referee: Brad Rogers
- TV announcers (CBS): Spero Dedes, Adam Archuleta and Aditi Kinkhabwala
- Recap, Game Book

Game information

**First quarter**

- IND – Josh Downs 22-yard pass from Joe Flacco (Matt Gay kick), 11:17. Colts 7–0. **Drive: 10 plays, 70 yards, 3:43.**
- TEN – Nick Westbrook-Ikhine 9-yard pass from Will Levis (Nick Folk kick), 6:51. Tied 7–7. **Drive: 3 plays, 27 yards, 1:31.**

**Second quarter**

- TEN – Nick Folk 44-yard field goal, 11:09. Colts 10–7. **Drive: 15 plays, 56 yards, 9:02.**
- IND – Matt Gay 26-yard field goal, 0:19. Tied 10–10. **Drive: 10 plays, 63 yards, 3:20.**

**Third quarter**

- TEN – Tony Pollard 23-yard run (Nick Folk kick), 6:19. Titans 17–10. **Drive: 14 plays, 70 yards, 8:41.**

**Fourth quarter**

- IND – Matt Gay 22-yard field goal, 14:57. Titans 17–13. **Drive: 15 plays, 66 yards, 6:22.**
- IND – Michael Pittman Jr. 10-yard pass from Joe Flacco (Matt Gay kick), 7:27. Colts 20–17. **Drive: 11 plays, 75 yards, 5:23.**

**Top passers**

- IND – Joe Flacco – 22/38, 189 yards, 2 TD, INT
- TEN – Will Levis – 16/27, 95 yards, TD, INT

**Top rushers**

- IND – Tyler Goodson – 8 rushes, 51 yards
- TEN – Tony Pollard – 17 rushes, 93 yards, TD

**Top receivers**

- IND – Josh Downs – 7 receptions, 66 yards, TD
- TEN – DeAndre Hopkins – 4 receptions, 54 yards

The Titans lost to their divisional rivals, dropping them to 1–4 for the season. Levis re-aggravated his shoulder after this performance, and would be sidelined for the next several games.

==== Week 7: at Buffalo Bills ====
Week 7: Tennessee Titans at Buffalo Bills – Game summary

Quarter	1	2	3	4	Total
Titans	3	7	0	0	**10**
**Bills**	0	7	10	17	**34**

at Highmark Stadium, Orchard Park, New York

- Date: October 20
- Game time: 1:00 p.m. EDT/12:00 p.m. CDT
- Game weather: Sunny, 66 °F (19 °C)
- Game attendance: 70,842
- Referee: John Hussey
- TV announcers (CBS): Andrew Catalon, Tiki Barber, Jason McCourty and A.J. Ross
- Recap, Game Book

Game information

**First quarter**

- TEN – Nick Folk 25-yard field goal, 2:57. Titans 3–0. **Drive: 13 plays, 61 yards, 7:03.**

**Second quarter**

- TEN – Nick Westbrook-Ikhine 4-yard pass from Mason Rudolph (Nick Folk kick), 11:31. Titans 10–0. **Drive: 8 plays, 75 yards, 4:45.**
- BUF – James Cook 11-yard run (Tyler Bass kick), 10:04. Titans 10–7. **Drive: 3 plays, 61 yards, 1:27.**

**Third quarter**

- BUF – Amari Cooper 12-yard pass from Josh Allen (Tyler Bass kick), 10:23. Bills 14–10. **Drive: 6 plays, 41 yards, 2:32.**
- BUF – Tyler Bass 28-yard field goal, 4:12. Bills 17–10. **Drive: 9 plays, 64 yards, 3:53.**

**Fourth quarter**

- BUF – Ty Johnson 4-yard pass from Josh Allen (Tyler Bass kick), 14:54. Bills 24–10. **Drive: 6 plays, 56 yards, 2:55.**
- BUF – Tyler Bass 30-yard field goal, 9:26. Bills 27–10. **Drive: 10 plays, 59 yards, 4:59.**
- BUF – Ray Davis 16-yard run (Tyler Bass kick), 1:53. Bills 34–10. **Drive: 5 plays, 84 yards, 2:44.**

**Top passers**

- TEN – Mason Rudolph – 25/40, 215 yards, TD, INT
- BUF – Josh Allen – 21/33, 323 yards, 2 TD

**Top rushers**

- TEN – Tony Pollard – 16 rushes, 61 yards
- BUF – Ray Davis – 5 rushes, 41 yards, TD

**Top receivers**

- TEN – Chig Okonkwo – 4 receptions, 50 yards
- BUF – Keon Coleman – 4 receptions, 125 yards

This game marked Mason Rudolph's first start as a Titan, but they lost heartily to the playoff-bound Buffalo Bills.

==== Week 8: at Detroit Lions ====
Week 8: Tennessee Titans at Detroit Lions – Game summary

Quarter	1	2	3	4	Total
Titans	7	7	0	0	**14**
**Lions**	14	21	17	0	**52**

at Ford Field, Detroit, Michigan

- Date: October 27
- Game time: 1:00 p.m. EDT/12:00 p.m. CDT
- Game weather: None (indoor stadium)
- Game attendance: 64,316
- Referee: Carl Cheffers
- TV announcers (Fox): Kevin Kugler, Daryl Johnston and Laura Okmin
- Recap, Game Book

Game information

**First quarter**

- DET – David Montgomery 7-yard run (Jake Bates kick), 10:31. Lions 7–0. **Drive: 2 plays, 23 yards, 0:28.**
- TEN – Mason Rudolph 11-yard run (Nick Folk kick), 4:07. Tied 7–7. **Drive: 4 plays, 75 yards, 2:13.**
- DET – Jahmyr Gibbs 70-yard run (Jake Bates kick), 3:57. Lions 14–7. **Drive: 1 play, 70 yards, 0:10.**

**Second quarter**

- TEN – Nick Westbrook-Ikhine 5-yard pass from Mason Rudolph (Nick Folk kick), 14:18. Tied 14–14. **Drive: 7 plays, 70 yards, 4:39.**
- DET – Brock Wright 8-yard pass from Jared Goff (Jake Bates kick), 12:51. Lions 21–14. **Drive: 3 plays, 25 yards, 1:27.**
- DET – Amon-Ra St. Brown 1-yard pass from Jared Goff (Jake Bates kick), 11:37. Lions 28–14. **Drive: 4 plays, 12 yards, 1:02.**
- DET – Sam LaPorta 3-yard pass from David Montgomery (Jake Bates kick), 2:18. Lions 35–14. **Drive: 7 plays, 22 yards, 3:59.**

**Third quarter**

- DET – Kalif Raymond 90-yard punt return (Jake Bates kick), 12:46. Lions 42–14. **Drive: 3 plays, 9 yards, 2:14.**
- DET – Kalif Raymond 7-yard pass from Jared Goff (Jake Bates kick), 6:12. Lions 49–14. **Drive: 3 plays, 26 yards, 1:25.**
- DET – Jake Bates 51-yard field goal, 1:08. Lions 52–14. **Drive: 8 plays, 48 yards, 4:00.**

**Fourth quarter**

- No scoring plays.

**Top passers**

- TEN – Mason Rudolph – 22/38, 266 yards, TD, 2 INT
- DET – Jared Goff – 12/15, 85 yards, 3 TD

**Top rushers**

- TEN – Tony Pollard – 20 rushes, 94 yards
- DET – Jahmyr Gibbs – 11 rushes, 127 yards, TD

**Top receivers**

- TEN – Calvin Ridley – 10 receptions, 143 yards
- DET – Sam LaPorta – 6 receptions, 48 yards, TD

Despite a competitive first quarter, the Titans were soon blown out in their biggest deficit of the season, dropping them to 1–6. The Titans especially struggled with special teams performance, giving up an astounding 262 total kick return yards, including a 90 yard touchdown on a punt return by former Titan Kalif Raymond.

==== Week 9: vs. New England Patriots ====
Week 9: New England Patriots at Tennessee Titans – Game summary

Quarter	1	2	3	4	OT	Total
Patriots	0	3	7	7	0	**17**
**Titans**	7	0	3	7	3	**20**

at Nissan Stadium, Nashville, Tennessee

- Date: November 3
- Game time: 12:00 p.m. CST
- Game weather: Cloudy, 75 °F (24 °C)
- Game attendance: 66,533
- Referee: Alex Kemp
- TV announcers (Fox): Jason Benetti, Mark Schlereth and Jen Hale
- Recap, Game Book

Game information

**First quarter**

- TEN – Nick Vannett 9-yard pass from Mason Rudolph (Nick Folk kick), 10:18. Titans 7–0. **Drive: 8 plays, 75 yards, 4:42.**

**Second quarter**

- NE – Joey Slye 52-yard field goal, 7:13. Titans 7–3. **Drive: 11 plays, 46 yards, 5:32.**

**Third quarter**

- NE – Rhamondre Stevenson 1-yard run (Joey Slye kick), 7:39. Patriots 10–7. **Drive: 12 plays, 70 yards, 7:21.**
- TEN – Nick Folk 21-yard field goal, 0:34. Tied 10–10. **Drive: 14 plays, 67 yards, 7:05.**

**Fourth quarter**

- TEN – Nick Westbrook-Ikhine 6-yard pass from Mason Rudolph (Nick Folk kick), 4:27. Titans 17–10. **Drive: 5 plays, 26 yards, 2:26.**
- NE – Rhamondre Stevenson 5-yard pass from Drake Maye (Joey Slye kick), 0:00. Tied 17–17. **Drive: 11 plays, 50 yards, 1:45.**

**Overtime**

- TEN – Nick Folk 25-yard field goal, 2:32. Titans 20–17. **Drive: 13 plays, 72 yards, 7:28.**

**Top passers**

- NE – Drake Maye – 29/41, 206 yards, TD, 2 INT
- TEN – Mason Rudolph – 20/33, 240 yards, 2 TD, 3 INT

**Top rushers**

- NE – Drake Maye – 8 rushes, 95 yards
- TEN – Tony Pollard – 28 rushes, 128 yards

**Top receivers**

- NE – Hunter Henry – 7 receptions, 56 yards
- TEN – Calvin Ridley – 5 receptions, 73 yards

In a competitive battle led by Mason Rudolph, rookie quarterback Drake Maye was able to tie the game with a gorgeous last-second touchdown just as time expired, bringing the game into overtime. However, the Titans were able to seal the game with a field goal and an interception by Amani Hooker, bouncing back to 2–6 and finishing 2–2 against the AFC East. This was also the Titans' only home win of the 2024 season as well as their 3rd win in their last 5 games against New England since 2017. As it turned out, this would be Brian Callahan's only home win as Titans head coach, as Tennessee would not win at home the rest of this season, and by the time of his firing the next season, the Titans were winless at home.

==== Week 10: at Los Angeles Chargers ====
Week 10: Tennessee Titans at Los Angeles Chargers – Game summary

Quarter	1	2	3	4	Total
Titans	7	0	3	7	**17**
**Chargers**	3	10	7	7	**27**

at SoFi Stadium, Inglewood, California

- Date: November 10
- Game time: 3:05 p.m. CST/1:05 p.m. PST
- Game weather: Sunny, 73 °F (23 °C) (fixed roof)
- Game attendance: 68,796
- Referee: Craig Wrolstad
- TV announcers (Fox): Kenny Albert, Jonathan Vilma and Megan Olivi
- Recap, Game Book

Game information

**First quarter**

- LAC – Cameron Dicker 21-yard field goal, 8:08. Chargers 3–0. **Drive: 12 plays, 68 yards, 6:52.**
- TEN – Calvin Ridley 41-yard pass from Will Levis (Nick Folk kick), 4:25. Titans 7–3. **Drive: 7 plays, 72 yards, 3:43.**

**Second quarter**

- LAC – Cameron Dicker 37-yard field goal, 12:07. Titans 7–6. **Drive: 9 plays, 57 yards, 3:41.**
- LAC – Justin Herbert 4-yard run (Cameron Dicker kick), 1:55. Chargers 13–7. **Drive: 8 plays, 61 yards, 4:24.**

**Third quarter**

- TEN – Nick Folk 27-yard field goal, 7:51. Chargers 13–10. **Drive: 11 plays, 62 yards, 7:09.**
- LAC – Quentin Johnston 16-yard pass from Justin Herbert (Cameron Dicker kick), 3:24. Chargers 20–10. **Drive: 7 plays, 43 yards, 4:27.**

**Fourth quarter**

- LAC – Hassan Haskins 1-yard run (Cameron Dicker kick), 7:39. Chargers 27–10. **Drive: 11 plays, 95 yards, 7:10.**
- TEN – Calvin Ridley 15-yard pass from Will Levis (Nick Folk kick), 0:49. Chargers 27–17. **Drive: 9 plays, 61 yards, 2:35.**

**Top passers**

- TEN – Will Levis – 18/23, 175 yards, 2 TD
- LAC – Justin Herbert – 14/18, 164 yards, TD

**Top rushers**

- TEN – Tyjae Spears – 7 rushes, 47 yards
- LAC – Gus Edwards – 10 rushes, 55 yards

**Top receivers**

- TEN – Calvin Ridley – 5 receptions, 84 yards, 2 TD
- LAC – Ladd McConkey – 2 receptions, 52 yards

Levis made his return as starting quarterback after three weeks out on injury. Despite a decent performance by Levis, and his first game of the season without making a turnover, the Titans were not able to pull away with the win.

The Titans remained winless on the road against the Chargers since their move to Tennessee, having not beat them in California since 1990, when they were still the Houston Oilers.

==== Week 11: vs. Minnesota Vikings ====
Week 11: Minnesota Vikings at Tennessee Titans – Game summary

Quarter	1	2	3	4	Total
**Vikings**	7	9	7	0	**23**
Titans	3	0	7	3	**13**

at Nissan Stadium, Nashville, Tennessee

- Date: November 17
- Game time: 12:00 p.m. CST
- Game weather: Sunny, 66 °F (19 °C)
- Game attendance: 67,686
- Referee: Clete Blakeman
- TV announcers (CBS): Spero Dedes, Adam Archuleta and Aditi Kinkhabwala
- Recap, Game Book

Game information

**First quarter**

- TEN – Nick Folk 30-yard field goal, 4:39. Titans 3–0. **Drive: 11 plays, 44 yards, 5:43.**
- MIN – Jordan Addison 47-yard pass from Sam Darnold (John Parker Romo kick), 3:16. Vikings 7–3. **Drive: 3 plays, 70 yards, 1:23.**

**Second quarter**

- MIN – Sam Darnold 1-yard run (kick failed, hit right upright), 7:40. Vikings 13–3. **Drive: 16 plays, 89 yards, 8:07.**
- MIN – John Parker Romo 40-yard field goal, 1:41. Vikings 16–3. **Drive: 11 plays, 40 yards, 4:27.**

**Third quarter**

- TEN – Nick Westbrook-Ikhine 98-yard pass from Will Levis (Nick Folk kick), 7:00. Vikings 16–10. **Drive: 3 plays, 98 yards, 1:30.**
- MIN – Cam Akers 3-yard pass from Sam Darnold (John Parker Romo kick), 3:15. Vikings 23–10. **Drive: 7 plays, 65 yards, 3:45.**

**Fourth quarter**

- TEN – Nick Folk 43-yard field goal, 14:08. Vikings 23–13. **Drive: 8 plays, 45 yards, 4:07.**

**Top passers**

- MIN – Sam Darnold – 20/32, 246 yards, 2 TD
- TEN – Will Levis – 17/31, 295 yards, TD, INT

**Top rushers**

- MIN – Aaron Jones – 15 rushes, 39 yards
- TEN – Will Levis – 7 rushes, 18 yards

**Top receivers**

- MIN – Justin Jefferson – 6 receptions, 81 yards
- TEN – Nick Westbrook-Ikhine – 2 receptions, 117 yards, TD

The Titans posted a strong performance against the highly ranked Vikings, but their success was spoiled by several high-impact penalties that erased a Titans touchdown and goal line stop that would have otherwise put the Titans ahead. The game featured a 98-yard touchdown pass to Nick Westbrook-Ikhine while Levis was backed up in their own end zone, tying the franchise record and becoming the league's longest pass of the season.

With the loss, the Titans dropped to 2–8 and were ultimately swept by the NFC North.

==== Week 12: at Houston Texans ====
Week 12: Tennessee Titans at Houston Texans – Game summary

Quarter	1	2	3	4	Total
**Titans**	10	10	3	9	**32**
Texans	7	10	7	3	**27**

at NRG Stadium, Houston, Texas

- Date: November 24
- Game time: 12:00 p.m. CST
- Game weather: None (retractable roof closed)
- Game attendance: 71,055
- Referee: Brad Rogers
- TV announcers (CBS): Tom McCarthy, Jay Feely, Ross Tucker and Amanda Balionis
- Recap, Game Book

Game information

**First quarter**

- HOU – Cade Stover 19-yard pass from C. J. Stroud (Kaʻimi Fairbairn kick), 14:42. Texans 7–0. **Drive: 1 play, 19 yards, 0:18.**
- TEN – Nick Folk 51-yard field goal, 11:15. Texans 7–3. **Drive: 6 plays, 28 yards, 3:27.**
- TEN – Nick Westbrook-Ikhine 38-yard pass from Will Levis (Nick Folk kick), 1:57. Titans 10–7. **Drive: 10 plays, 89 yards, 5:59.**

**Second quarter**

- TEN – Tony Pollard 10-yard run (Nick Folk kick), 11:03. Titans 17–7. **Drive: 6 plays, 95 yards, 3:44.**
- HOU – Nico Collins 5-yard pass from C. J. Stroud (Kaʻimi Fairbairn kick), 6:17. Titans 17–14. **Drive: 10 plays, 78 yards, 4:46.**
- HOU – Kaʻimi Fairbairn 28-yard field goal, 1:47. Tied 17–17. **Drive: 5 plays, 55 yards, 1:37.**
- TEN – Nick Folk 56-yard field goal, 0:00. Titans 20–17. **Drive: 4 plays, -18 yards, 0:37.**

**Third quarter**

- TEN – Nick Folk 51-yard field goal, 9:08. Titans 23–17. **Drive: 11 plays, 41 yards, 5:52.**
- HOU – Jimmie Ward 65-yard interception return (Kaʻimi Fairbairn kick), 0:04. Texans 24–23.

**Fourth quarter**

- HOU – Kaʻimi Fairbairn 54-yard field goal, 9:46. Texans 27–23. **Drive: 4 plays, 7 yards, 1:38.**
- TEN – Chig Okonkwo 70-yard pass from Will Levis (Nick Folk kick), 9:35. Titans 30–27. **Drive: 1 play, 70 yards, 0:11.**
- TEN – C. J. Stroud sacked in the end zone for a safety, 1:13. Titans 32–27.

**Top passers**

- TEN – Will Levis – 18/24, 278 yards, 2 TD, INT
- HOU – C. J. Stroud – 20/33, 247 yards, 2 TD, 2 INT

**Top rushers**

- TEN – Tony Pollard – 24 rushes, 119 yards, TD
- HOU – Joe Mixon – 14 rushes, 22 yards

**Top receivers**

- TEN – Calvin Ridley – 5 receptions, 93 yards
- HOU – Nico Collins – 5 receptions, 92 yards, TD

The Titans were finally able to post a divisional win against the favored 7–4 Texans. Although the Texans were on the verge of tying the Titans in an exciting fourth quarter, a missed field goal and last minute safety brought the Titans to victory and a 3–8 record. This was the first (and only) full win of the season by a Levis-led offense as well as their only divisional win of the season.

==== Week 13: at Washington Commanders ====
Week 13: Tennessee Titans at Washington Commanders – Game summary

Quarter	1	2	3	4	Total
Titans	0	7	6	6	**19**
**Commanders**	21	7	0	14	**42**

at Northwest Stadium, Landover, Maryland

- Date: December 1
- Game time: 1:00 p.m. EST/12:00 p.m. CST
- Game weather: Cloudy, 42 °F (6 °C)
- Game attendance: 63,144
- Referee: Ronald Torbert
- TV announcers (CBS): Andrew Catalon, Tiki Barber, Jason McCourty and A. J. Ross
- Recap, Game Book

Game information

**First quarter**

- WAS – Brian Robinson Jr. 40-yard run (Zane Gonzalez kick), 11:58. Commanders 7–0. **Drive: 3 plays, 59 yards, 1:10.**
- WAS – Jayden Daniels 3-yard run (Zane Gonzalez kick), 2:23. Commanders 14–0. **Drive: 11 plays, 80 yards, 6:37.**
- WAS – Terry McLaurin 16-yard pass from Jayden Daniels (Zane Gonzalez kick), 0:24. Commanders 21–0. **Drive: 3 plays, 24 yards, 1:09.**

**Second quarter**

- WAS – Terry McLaurin 3-yard pass from Jayden Daniels (Zane Gonzalez kick), 10:59. Commanders 28–0. **Drive: 9 plays, 34 yards, 4:20.**
- TEN – Nick Westbrook-Ikhine 27-yard pass from Will Levis (Nick Folk kick), 0:23. Commanders 28–7. **Drive: 9 plays, 64 yards, 1:29.**

**Third quarter**

- TEN – Nick Folk 41-yard field goal, 8:41. Commanders 28–10. **Drive: 9 plays, 40 yards, 4:06.**
- TEN – Nick Folk 44-yard field goal, 3:40. Commanders 28–13. **Drive: 7 plays, 36 yards, 2:51.**

**Fourth quarter**

- WAS – Zach Ertz 4-yard pass from Jayden Daniels (Zane Gonzalez kick), 14:15. Commanders 35–13. **Drive: 9 plays, 72 yards, 4:25.**
- TEN – Nick Westbrook-Ikhine 17-yard pass from Will Levis (pass failed), 7:07. Commanders 35–19. **Drive: 7 plays, 58 yards, 2:09.**
- WAS – Chris Rodriguez Jr. 7-yard run (Zane Gonzalez kick), 3:31. Commanders 42–19. **Drive: 9 plays, 71 yards, 3:36.**

**Top passers**

- TEN – Will Levis – 18/37, 212 yards, 2 TD
- WAS – Jayden Daniels – 25/30, 206 yards, 3 TD, INT

**Top rushers**

- TEN – Tony Pollard – 8 rushes, 35 yards
- WAS – Brian Robinson Jr. – 16 rushes, 103 yards, TD

**Top receivers**

- TEN – Nick Westbrook-Ikhine – 3 receptions, 61 yards, 2 TD
- WAS – Terry McLaurin – 8 receptions, 73 yards, 2 TD

Unable to preserve their momentum from last week's win, the team struggled with early penalties and fumbles, allowing the Commanders to blitz their way to a 28–0 lead early into the second quarter. Although the Titans were able to avoid a first half blowout and attempted to rally in the second half, they ultimately struggled to contain the dual-threat rookie Jayden Daniels, ending the day in a disheartening 19–42 loss.

==== Week 14: vs. Jacksonville Jaguars ====
Week 14: Jacksonville Jaguars at Tennessee Titans – Game summary

Quarter	1	2	3	4	Total
**Jaguars**	0	0	0	10	**10**
Titans	3	0	3	0	**6**

at Nissan Stadium, Nashville, Tennessee

- Date: December 8
- Game time: 12:00 p.m. CST
- Game weather: Cloudy, 53 °F (12 °C)
- Game attendance: 61,644
- Referee: Tra Blake
- TV announcers (CBS): Andrew Catalon, Tiki Barber, Jason McCourty and A.J. Ross
- Recap, Game Book

Game information

**First quarter**

- TEN – Nick Folk 46-yard field goal, 8:32. Titans 3–0. **Drive: 11 plays, 51 yards, 6:28.**

**Second quarter**

- No scoring plays.

**Third quarter**

- TEN – Nick Folk 39-yard field goal, 4:30. Titans 6–0. **Drive: 11 plays, 45 yards, 5:37.**

**Fourth quarter**

- JAX – Cam Little 23-yard field goal, 12:09. Titans 6–3. **Drive: 14 plays, 65 yards, 7:21.**
- JAX – Tank Bigsby 8-yard run (Cam Little kick), 6:46. Jaguars 10–6. **Drive: 7 plays, 81 yards, 3:21.**

**Top passers**

- JAX – Mac Jones – 23/31, 220 yards, 2 INT
- TEN – Will Levis – 19/32, 168 yards

**Top rushers**

- JAX – Tank Bigsby – 18 rushes, 55 yards, TD
- TEN – Tony Pollard – 21 rushes, 102 yards

**Top receivers**

- JAX – Brian Thomas Jr. – 8 receptions, 86 yards
- TEN – Calvin Ridley – 7 receptions, 59 yards

The favored Titans fell against a Mac Jones-led Jaguars in an uneventful 6–10 loss. This game was the first of the season where the Titans were not able to score a single touchdown. The loss also eliminated Tennessee from playoff contention.

==== Week 15: vs. Cincinnati Bengals ====
Week 15: Cincinnati Bengals at Tennessee Titans – Game summary

Quarter	1	2	3	4	Total
**Bengals**	7	17	7	6	**37**
Titans	14	0	0	13	**27**

at Nissan Stadium, Nashville, Tennessee

- Date: December 15
- Game time: 12:00 p.m. CST
- Game weather: Cloudy, 52 °F (11 °C)
- Game attendance: 63,745
- Referee: Craig Wrolstad
- TV announcers (Fox): Kevin Kugler, Daryl Johnston and Laura Okmin
- Recap, Game Book

Game information

**First quarter**

- TEN – Tony Pollard 3-yard run (Nick Folk kick), 10:52. Titans 7–0. **Drive: 6 plays, 29 yards, 3:23.**
- CIN – Chase Brown 6-yard pass from Joe Burrow (Cade York kick), 6:36. Tied 7–7. **Drive: 9 plays, 70 yards, 4:16.**
- TEN – Tyjae Spears 1-yard run (Nick Folk kick), 3:58. Titans 14–7. **Drive: 5 plays, 70 yards, 2:38.**

**Second quarter**

- CIN – Sam Hubbard 2-yard pass from Joe Burrow (Cade York kick), 5:13. Tied 14–14. **Drive: 9 plays, 62 yards, 4:52.**
- CIN – Tee Higgins 38-yard pass from Joe Burrow (Cade York kick), 1:12. Bengals 21–14. **Drive: 3 plays, 38 yards, 0:47.**
- CIN – Cade York 21-yard field goal, 0:02. Bengals 24–14. **Drive: 11 plays, 35 yards, 1:05.**

**Third quarter**

- CIN – Geno Stone 39-yard interception return (Cade York kick), 7:24. Bengals 31–14.

**Fourth quarter**

- TEN – Tyjae Spears 17-yard pass from Mason Rudolph (Nick Folk kick), 6:50. Bengals 31–21. **Drive: 9 plays, 87 yards, 3:39.**
- CIN – Chase Brown 5-yard run (kick failed, wide left), 1:09. Bengals 37–21. **Drive: 14 plays, 67 yards, 5:41.**
- TEN – Josh Whyle 13-yard pass from Mason Rudolph, 0:00. Bengals 37–27. **Drive: 7 plays, 70 yards, 1:09.**

**Top passers**

- CIN – Joe Burrow – 26/37, 271 yards, 3 TD, 2 INT
- TEN – Mason Rudolph – 21/26, 209 yards, 2 TD, INT

**Top rushers**

- CIN – Chase Brown – 25 rushes, 97 yards, TD
- TEN – Tony Pollard – 17 rushes, 45 yards, TD

**Top receivers**

- CIN – Ja'Marr Chase – 9 receptions, 94 yards
- TEN – Tyjae Spears – 6 receptions, 87 yards, TD

After his fourth turnover, Will Levis was ultimately benched for Mason Rudolph in the third quarter, marking the first time Levis was sidelined for non-medical reasons. Rudolph was unable to mount a comeback, bringing the Titans down to 3–11 for the season. This game featured an astounding ten turnovers by the two teams (six by Tennessee, four by Cincinnati).

==== Week 16: at Indianapolis Colts ====
Week 16: Tennessee Titans at Indianapolis Colts – Game summary

Quarter	1	2	3	4	Total
Titans	7	0	8	15	**30**
**Colts**	0	24	14	0	**38**

at Lucas Oil Stadium, Indianapolis, Indiana

- Date: December 22
- Game time: 1:00 p.m. EST/12:00 p.m. CST
- Game weather: None (retractable roof closed)
- Game attendance: 65,322
- Referee: John Hussey
- TV announcers (CBS): Tom McCarthy, Jay Feely, Ross Tucker and Tiffany Blackmon
- Recap, Game Book

Game information

**First quarter**

- TEN – Calvin Ridley 38-yard pass from Mason Rudolph (Brayden Narveson kick), 7:47. Titans 7–0. **Drive: 6 plays, 65 yards, 3:08.**

**Second quarter**

- IND – Anthony Richardson 5-yard run (Matt Gay kick), 11:01. Tied 7–7. **Drive: 6 plays, 57 yards, 3:10.**
- IND – Jonathan Taylor 65-yard run (Matt Gay kick), 7:25. Colts 14–7. **Drive: 4 plays, 80 yards, 2:10.**
- IND – Matt Gay 31-yard field goal, 2:09. Colts 17–7. **Drive: 8 plays, 65 yards, 4:11.**
- IND – Josh Downs 27-yard pass from Anthony Richardson (Matt Gay kick), 0:15. Colts 24–7. **Drive: 3 plays, 33 yards, 1:10.**

**Third quarter**

- IND – Jonathan Taylor 70-yard run (Matt Gay kick), 14:42. Colts 31–7. **Drive: 1 play, 70 yards, 0:18.**
- IND – Jonathan Taylor 1-yard run (Matt Gay kick), 6:50. Colts 38–7. **Drive: 4 plays, 40 yards, 1:43.**
- TEN – Tyjae Spears 11-yard run (Tony Pollard run), 2:57. Colts 38–15. **Drive: 9 plays, 70 yards, 3:53.**

**Fourth quarter**

- TEN – Nick Westbrook-Ikhine 6-yard pass from Mason Rudolph (Brayden Narveson kick), 8:13. Colts 38–22. **Drive: 6 plays, 55 yards, 2:17.**
- TEN – Tyjae Spears 2-yard run (Mason Rudolph–Chig Okonkwo pass), 2:53. Colts 38–30. **Drive: 7 plays, 71 yards, 3:05.**

**Top passers**

- TEN – Mason Rudolph – 23/34, 252 yards, 2 TD, 3 INT
- IND – Anthony Richardson – 7/11, 131 yards, TD, INT

**Top rushers**

- TEN – Tony Pollard – 8 rushes, 35 yards
- IND – Jonathan Taylor – 29 rushes, 218 yards, 3 TD

**Top receivers**

- TEN – Chig Okonkwo – 9 receptions, 81 yards
- IND – Josh Downs – 3 receptions, 61 yards, TD

The Titans defense was gashed for 335 rushing yards, and despite a late rally, Tennessee fell 38–30 to Indianapolis, suffering their second consecutive season sweep by their rivals.

==== Week 17: at Jacksonville Jaguars ====
Week 17: Tennessee Titans at Jacksonville Jaguars – Game summary

Quarter	1	2	3	4	Total
Titans	0	3	7	3	**13**
**Jaguars**	3	10	0	7	**20**

at EverBank Stadium, Jacksonville, Florida

- Date: December 29
- Game time: 1:00 p.m. EST/12:00 p.m. CST
- Game weather: 72 °F (22 °C)
- Game attendance: 61,995
- Referee: Shawn Smith
- TV announcers (CBS): Spero Dedes, Adam Archuleta and Aditi Kinkhabwala
- Recap, Game Book

Game information

**First quarter**

- JAX – Cam Little 48-yard field goal, 10:46. Jaguars 3–0. **Drive: 9 plays, 38 yards, 4:14.**

**Second quarter**

- JAX – Parker Washington 2-yard pass from Mac Jones (Cam Little kick), 8:59. Jaguars 10–0. **Drive: 5 plays, 43 yards, 2:45.**
- JAX – Cam Little 44-yard field goal, 2:02. Jaguars 13–0. **Drive: 12 plays, 54 yards, 5:16.**
- TEN – Nick Folk 39-yard field goal, 0:00. Jaguars 13–3. **Drive: 10 plays, 50 yards, 2:02.**

**Third quarter**

- TEN – Nick Vannett 8-yard pass from Mason Rudolph (Nick Folk kick), 6:51. Jaguars 13–10. **Drive: 13 plays, 85 yards, 8:09.**

**Fourth quarter**

- JAX – Brian Thomas Jr. 11-yard pass from Mac Jones (Cam Little kick), 7:05. Jaguars 20–10. **Drive: 16 plays, 74 yards, 9:11.**
- TEN – Nick Folk 28-yard field goal, 2:02. Jaguars 20–13. **Drive: 12 plays, 60 yards, 5:03.**

**Top passers**

- TEN – Mason Rudolph – 19/31, 193 yards, TD, INT
- JAX – Mac Jones – 15/22, 174 yards, 2 TD

**Top rushers**

- TEN – Tyjae Spears – 20 rushes, 95 yards
- JAX – Travis Etienne – 15 rushes, 49 yards

**Top receivers**

- TEN – Calvin Ridley – 5 receptions, 84 yards
- JAX – Brian Thomas Jr. – 7 receptions, 91 yards, TD

With the loss the Titans were swept by Jacksonville for the second time in the last three years. As a result, the Titans secured a last place finish in the AFC South for the second year in a row.

==== Week 18: vs. Houston Texans ====
Week 18: Houston Texans at Tennessee Titans – Game summary

Quarter	1	2	3	4	Total
**Texans**	7	9	0	7	**23**
Titans	0	3	3	8	**14**

at Nissan Stadium, Nashville, Tennessee

- Date: January 5
- Game time: 12:00 p.m. CST
- Game weather: Cloudy, 35 °F (2 °C)
- Game attendance: 61,815
- Referee: Brad Allen
- TV announcers (CBS): Tom McCarthy, Jay Feely, Ross Tucker and Amanda Balionis
- Recap, Game Book

Game information

**First quarter**

- HOU – Nico Collins 2-yard pass from C. J. Stroud (Ka'imi Fairbairn kick), 7:43. Texans 7–0. **Drive: 11 plays, 69 yards, 7:17.**

**Second quarter**

- HOU – Dameon Pierce 92-yard run (kick failed), 13:55. Texans 13–0. **Drive: 1 play, 92 yards, 0:12.**
- TEN – Matthew Wright 35-yard field goal, 1:41. Texans 13–3. **Drive: 11 plays, 53 yards, 4:55.**
- HOU – Ka'imi Fairbairn 27-yard field goal, 0:00. Texans 16–3. **Drive: 7 plays, 51 yards, 1:41.**

**Third quarter**

- TEN – Matthew Wright 38-yard field goal, 6:47. Texans 16–6. **Drive: 13 plays, 53 yards, 8:13.**

**Fourth quarter**

- HOU – Derek Barnett 36-yard fumble recovery for a touchdown (Ka'imi Fairbairn kick), 13:50. Texans 23–6.
- TEN – Tay Martin 49-yard pass from Will Levis (Will Levis-Josh Whyle pass), 2:41. Texans 23–14. **Drive: 9 plays, 94 yards, 3:00.**

**Top passers**

- HOU – Davis Mills – 12/22, 128 yards
- TEN – Will Levis – 9/17, 175 yards, TD

**Top rushers**

- HOU – Dameon Pierce – 19 rushes, 176 yards, TD
- TEN – Tony Pollard – 22 rushes, 62 yards

**Top receivers**

- HOU – Robert Woods – 2 receptions, 39 yards
- TEN – Calvin Ridley – 3 receptions, 76 yards

With the 23–14 loss at home the Titans finish the season at 3–14, the worst record for the team since 2014, and lost their fourth straight home game against the Texans. The Patriots win over Buffalo ensured the Titans the #1 pick in the 2025 NFL draft.

=== Standings ===
==== Division ====
AFC South
	W	L	T	PCT	DIV	CONF	PF	PA	STK
^{(4)} Houston Texans	10	7	0	.588	5–1	8–4	372	372	W1
Indianapolis Colts	8	9	0	.471	3–3	7–5	377	427	W1
Jacksonville Jaguars	4	13	0	.235	3–3	4–8	320	435	L1
Tennessee Titans	3	14	0	.176	1–5	3–9	311	460	L6

==== Conference ====
AFC
Seed	Team	Division	W	L	T	PCT	DIV	CONF	SOS	SOV	STK
**Division leaders**
1	Kansas City Chiefs	West	15	2	0	.882	5–1	10–2	.488	.463	L1
2	Buffalo Bills	East	13	4	0	.765	5–1	9–3	.467	.448	L1
3	Baltimore Ravens	North	12	5	0	.706	4–2	8–4	.529	.525	W4
4	Houston Texans	South	10	7	0	.588	5–1	8–4	.481	.376	W1
**Wild cards**
5	Los Angeles Chargers	West	11	6	0	.647	4–2	8–4	.467	.348	W3
6 (Note: Pittsburgh clinched the #6 seed over Denver based on head-to-head victory.)	Pittsburgh Steelers	North	10	7	0	.588	3–3	7–5	.502	.453	L4
7	Denver Broncos	West	10	7	0	.588	3–3	6–6	.502	.394	W1
**Did not qualify for the postseason**
8	Cincinnati Bengals	North	9	8	0	.529	3–3	6–6	.478	.314	W5
9 (Note: Indianapolis finished ahead of Miami based on head-to-head victory.)	Indianapolis Colts	South	8	9	0	.471	3–3	7–5	.457	.309	W1
10	Miami Dolphins	East	8	9	0	.471	3–3	6–6	.419	.294	L1
11	New York Jets	East	5	12	0	.294	2–4	5–7	.495	.341	W1
12 (Note: Jacksonville finished ahead of New England and Las Vegas based on conference record. (Jacksonville 4–8 to New England 3–9 to Las Vegas 3–9))	Jacksonville Jaguars	South	4	13	0	.235	3–3	4–8	.478	.265	L1
13 (Note: New England finished ahead of Las Vegas based on strength of victory. (New England .471 to Las Vegas .353))	New England Patriots	East	4	13	0	.235	2–4	3–9	.471	.471	W1
14	Las Vegas Raiders	West	4	13	0	.235	0–6	3–9	.540	.353	L1
15 (Note: Cleveland finished ahead of Tennessee based on strength of victory. (Cleveland .510 to Tennessee .431))	Cleveland Browns	North	3	14	0	.176	2–4	3–9	.536	.510	L6
16	Tennessee Titans	South	3	14	0	.176	1–5	3–9	.522	.431	L6
