= L'Jarius Sneed =

American football player (born 1997)

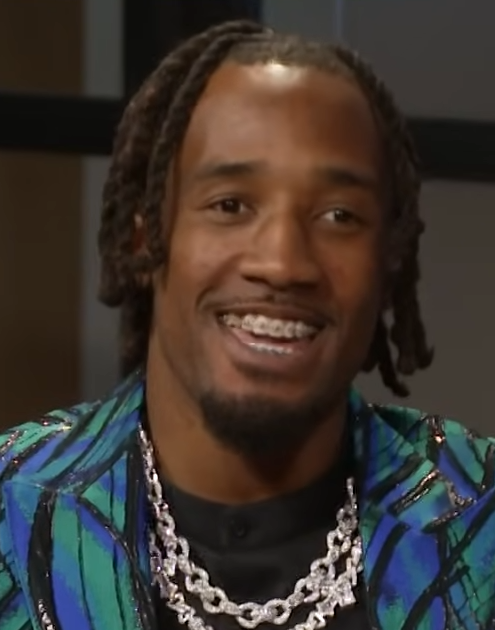
- Sneed in 2024

No. 38 – Kansas City Chiefs
- Position: Cornerback
- Roster status: Injured reserve

Personal information
- Born: January 21, 1997 (age 29); Minden, Louisiana, U.S.
- Listed height: 6 ft 1 in (1.85 m)
- Listed weight: 192 lb (87 kg)

Career information
- High school: Minden
- College: Louisiana Tech (2016–2019)
- NFL draft: 2020: 4th round, 138th overall pick

Career history
- Kansas City Chiefs (2020–2023); Tennessee Titans (2024–2025); Kansas City Chiefs (2026–present)

Awards and highlights
- 2× Super Bowl champion (LVII, LVIII); PFWA All-Rookie Team (2020); Second-team All-C-USA (2019)

Career NFL statistics as of Week 7, 2026
- Total tackles: 384
- Sacks: 6.5
- Forced fumbles: 6
- Fumble recoveries: 4
- Pass deflections: 46
- Interceptions: 10
- Stats at Pro Football Reference

L'Jarius Sneed (/ləˈdʒæriəs/ lə-JARR-ee-əss; born January 21, 1997) is an American professional football cornerback for the Kansas City Chiefs of the National Football League (NFL). He played college football for the Louisiana Tech Bulldogs and was selected by the Chiefs in the fourth round of the 2020 NFL draft. He has also played in the NFL for the Tennessee Titans.

== Early life ==
After playing wide receiver for Minden High School in Minden, Louisiana, Sneed committed to Louisiana Tech on February 3, 2016.

== College career ==
Sneed converted to cornerback at Louisiana Tech and saw playing time in his true freshman season, highlighted by an interception return touchdown against Western Kentucky in the Conference USA Championship Game. He started about half the games at corner during his sophomore season before moving into a permanent starting role his junior season. He moved to free safety before his senior season, and was named second-team all-C-USA after the season. Sneed also participated in the 2020 NFLPA Collegiate Bowl.

== Professional career ==
=== Pre-draft ===
External videos
- L'Jarius Sneed's 40–yard dash
- L'Jarius Sneed: LA Tech highlights

Although Sneed started at safety as a senior, he opted to transition back to cornerback and publicly stated he desired to play cornerback in the NFL. He played cornerback at the NFLPA All-star game and received positive feedback from analysts and Chiefs' scout Willie Davis. Kevin Hanson of Sports Illustrated ranked Sneed as the 15th best safety prospect in the draft. NFL draft analyst Daniel Jeremiah ranked him as the ninth best safety in the draft. The majority of NFL draft analysts projected Sneed to be drafted as early as the fourth round to as late as a seventh round pick in the 2020 NFL draft. NFL analyst Lance Zierlein projected him to be a fifth round pick.

"I fell in love with LJ just watching his college tape. I was a little shocked — you ask around to scouts and other people, they didn't have him (high). I thought I was missing something."

— Steve Spagnuolo (Chiefs' Defensive Coordinator)

Pre-draft measurables
Height	Weight	Arm length	Hand span	Wingspan	40-yard dash	10-yard split	20-yard split	Vertical jump	Broad jump	Bench press
6 ft 0 1/2 in (1.84 m)	192 lb (87 kg)	31 3/8 in (0.80 m)	8 7/8 in (0.23 m)	6 ft 3 3/8 in (1.91 m)	4.37 s	1.51 s	2.56 s	41.0 in (1.04 m)	10 ft 11 in (3.33 m)	12 reps
All values from NFL Combine

=== Kansas City Chiefs (first stint) ===
The Kansas City Chiefs selected Sneed in the fourth round (138th overall) of the 2020 NFL draft. He was the 12th safety drafted in 2020.

External videos
- Chiefs draft L'Jarius Sneed No. 138
- Draft Press conference: L'Jarius Sneed
- The call to L'Jarius Sneed: 2020 Draft

"Even in meetings we could tell he was a cerebral guy. (He) played a lot of positions in college, which led us to believe he could handle things mentally."

— Steve Spagnuolo (Chiefs' Defensive Coordinator)

==== 2020 ====
On July 20, 2020, the Kansas City Chiefs signed Sneed to a four–year, $3.92 million contract that includes an initial signing bonus of $634,320.

Defensive coordinator Steve Spagnuolo chose to place Sneed at cornerback. Throughout training camp, he competed to be a starting cornerback after it was available following the departures of Kendall Fuller and Morris Claiborne. He competed against Rashad Fenton, Bashaud Breeland, and Antonio Hamilton. Head coach Andy Reid named Sneed the fourth cornerback on the depth chart to begin the season, behind starting cornerbacks Charvarius Ward and Rashad Fenton and starting nickelback Antonio Hamilton.

On September 10, 2020, Sneed earned his first career start as a nickelback during his professional regular season debut and recorded three solo tackles, two pass deflections, and made his first career interception on a pass thrown by Deshaun Watson to wide receiver Brandin Cooks during a 34–20 victory against the Houston Texans. On September 20, 2020, Sneed started as the No. 2 starting cornerback after Charvarius Ward fractured his hand in Week 1. He made seven combined tackles (six solo), a pass deflection, and had his second consecutive game with an interception on a pass by Justin Herbert to Keenan Allen during a 23–20 victory at the Los Angeles Chargers. On September 28, 2020, Sneed made one solo tackle before exiting in the second quarter of a 34–20 victory at the Baltimore Ravens due to a hand injury. On September 30, 2020, the Kansas City Chiefs officially placed him on injured reserve after it was discovered he had fractured his hand in Week 3. On November 21, 2020, the Kansas City Chiefs activated Sneed off of injured reserve after he missed six consecutive games (Weeks 4–9). On December 18, 2020, Sneed collected a season-high eight combined tackles (seven solo) during a 33–27 win at the Miami Dolphins. In Week 15, he made three combined tackles (one solo), a season-high three pass deflections, recorded his first career sack, and intercepted a pass thrown by Drew Brees to Lil'Jordan Humphrey during a 32–29 win at the New Orleans Saints. He was named to the PFWA All-Rookie Team. He was inactive as a healthy scratch for a Week 17 loss to the Los Angeles Chargers as head coach Andy Reid elected to bench the majority of his starters before entering the playoffs. He finished his rookie campaign with a total of 41 combined tackles (31 solo), seven pass deflections, three interceptions, and two sacks in nine games and six starts. He received an overall grade of 68.4 from Pro Football Focus as a rookie in 2020.

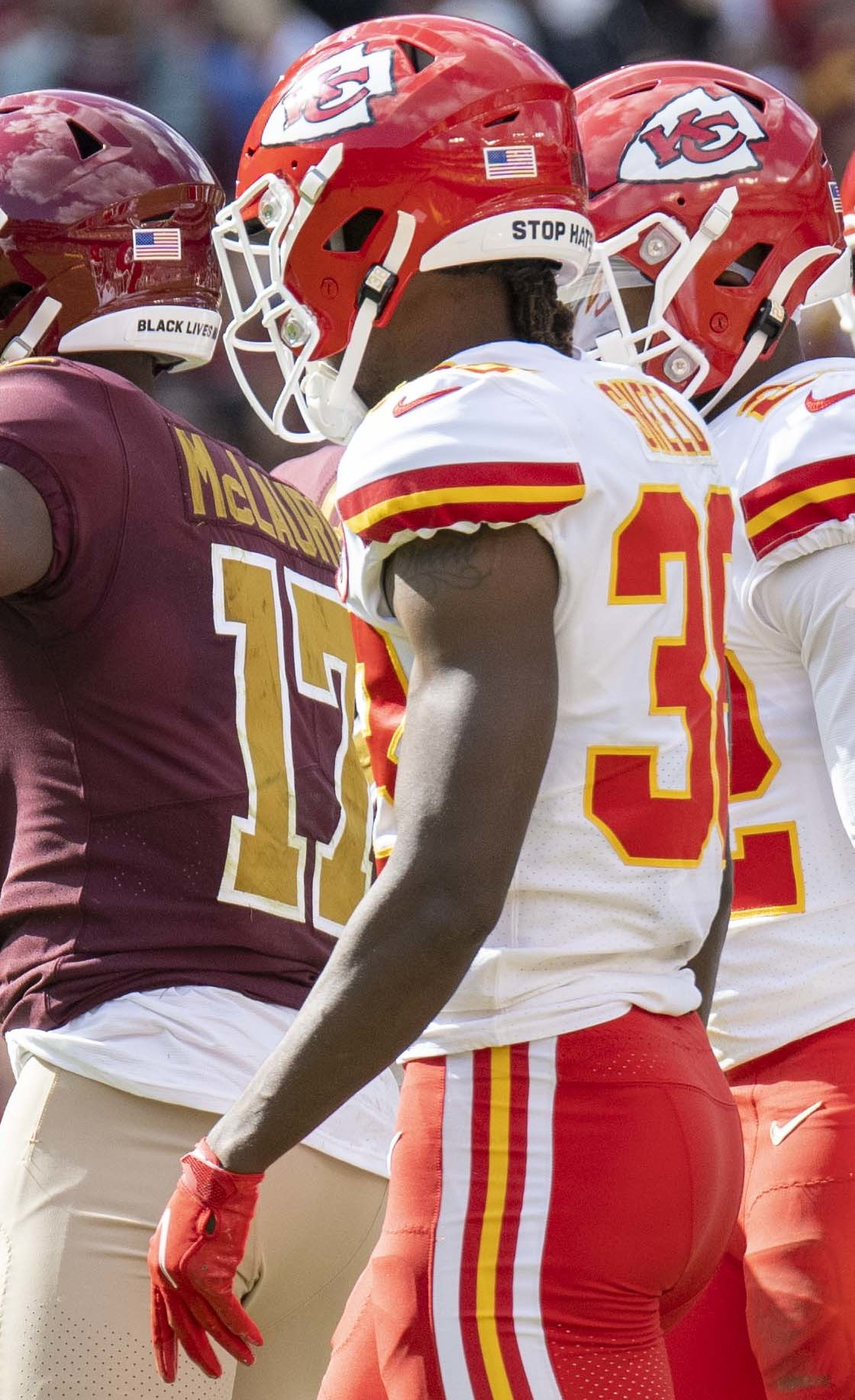
Sneed playing for the Chiefs in 2021

The Kansas City Chiefs finished the 2020 NFL season first in the AFC West with a 14–2 record to clinch a playoff berth. On January 17, 2021, Sneed started in his first career playoff game and recorded six combined tackles (three solo) and made one sack during a 22–17 victory in the Divisional Round against the Cleveland Browns. In the AFC Championship, Sneed recorded five combined tackles (four solo) and made one sack in the Chiefs 38–24 victory against the Buffalo Bills. On February 7, 2021, Sneed started in Super Bowl LV and made three combined tackles (two solo) as the Kansas City Chiefs lost 9–31 to the Tampa Bay Buccaneers.

==== 2021 ====
He entered training camp as the favorite to win the job as the No. 2 starting cornerback after Bashaud Breeland departed during free agency. He competed against Deandre Baker, Mike Hughes, Rashad Fenton, BoPete Keyes, and Marlon Character. Head coach Andy Reid named Sneed and Charvarius Ward the starting cornerbacks to begin the season.

On September 12, 2021, Sneed started in the Kansas City Chiefs' home-opener against the Cleveland Browns and recorded a season-high seven solo tackles as the Chiefs won 33–29. On November 7, 2021, Sneed made six combined tackles (three solo), two pass deflections, and intercepted a pass thrown by Jordan Love to wide receiver Davante Adams in the Chiefs' 13–7 win against the Green Bay Packers. In Week 11, he made six combined tackles (five solo), a season-high three pass deflections, and intercepted a pass attempt by Dak Prescott to wide receiver Malik Turner, sealing the Chiefs' 19–9 victory against the Dallas Cowboys. On December 12, 2021, the Chiefs' head coach Andy Reid addressed the media and stated Sneed would be inactive for the upcoming Week 14 matchup against the Las Vegas Raiders so he could return to home to be with his family after the sudden death of his older brother T’Qarontarion “TQ” Harrison who was murdered. He would remain inactive for two games (Weeks 14–15). He completed his sophomore season in 2021 with a total of 76 combined tackles (57 solo), eight pass deflections, two interceptions, one sack, one forced fumble, and a fumble recovery in 15 games and 15 starts. Pro Football Focus had Sneed finish the season with an overall grade of 63.6 in 2021.

The Kansas City Chiefs finished the 2021 NFL season first in the AFC West with a 12–5 record, clinching a playoff berth. They defeated the Pittsburgh Steelers 42–21 in the AFC Wildcard Game and advanced to the Divisional Game where Sneed recorded nine combined tackles (six solo) and broke up a pass during a 42–36 overtime victory against the Buffalo Bills. On January 30, 2022, Sneed produced a team-leading ten combined tackles (eight solo), a pass deflection, and intercepted a pass by Joe Burrow to wide receiver Ja'Marr Chase as the Cincinnati Bengals lost 27–24 in overtime.

==== 2022 ====
During the off-season, the Kansas City Chiefs completely overhauled their secondary and retained Sneed as the lone cornerback to return. The Chiefs drafted three cornerbacks in the 2022 NFL draft to replace Charvarius Ward, Deandre Baker, and Mike Hughes. Head coach Andy Reid named Sneed the No. 1 starting cornerback to begin the season and was paired with rookie first-round pick Trent McDuffie with fellow rookies Jaylen Watson and Joshua Williams as the backup cornerbacks.

In Week 4, Sneed collected a season-high nine combined tackles (seven solo), made a sack, and forced a fumble during a 41–31 victory at the Tampa Bay Buccaneers. On November 27, 2022, he made seven combined tackles (five solo), a season-high two pass deflections, and intercepted a pass by Bryce Perkins as the Chiefs defeated the Los Angeles Rams 26–10. On January 1, 2023, Sneed made five combined tackles (three solo), broke up a pass, and tied his career-high with his third interception of the season off a pass by Russell Wilson intended for Jerry Jeudy as the Chiefs defeated the Denver Broncos 24–27. He started all 17 games for the first time in his career and finished with a total of 108 combined tackles (75 solo), 11 pass deflections, 3.5 sacks, three interceptions, three forced fumbles, and one fumble recovery.

The Kansas City Chiefs finished the 2022 NFL season atop the AFC West with a 14–3 record, clinching a first-round bye and home-field advantage. On January 21, 2013, he collected nine combined tackles (six solo) during a 27–20 win against the Jacksonville Jaguars in the Divisional Round. The following game, the Chiefs defeated the Cincinnati Bengals 23–20 in the AFC Championship Game. On February 12, 2023, Sneed started in Super Bowl LVII and recorded seven combined tackles (three solo) and made two pass deflections as the Chiefs defeated the Philadelphia Eagles 38–35, earning Sneed his first Super Bowl ring.

==== 2023 ====
Defensive coordinator Steve Spagnuolo retained Sneed and Trent McDuffie as the starting cornerback tandem to begin the season. On November 20, 2023, he made three combined tackles (two solo), tied his season-high of two pass deflections, and intercepted a pass by Jalen Hurts that was thrown to wide receiver A. J. Brown during a 17–21 loss to the Philadelphia Eagles. In Week 12, Sneed produced a season-high nine combined tackles (six solo) during a 31–17 win at the Las Vegas Raiders. Head coach Andy Reid chose to rest his starters, including Sneed, in the Chiefs' Week 18 win at the Los Angeles Chargers to have them rested before the upcoming playoffs. He finished with 78 combined tackles (60 solo), a career-high 14 pass deflections, two interceptions, and one forced fumble in 16 games and 16 starts. He received an overall grade of 70.6 from Pro Football Focus, which ranked 36th amongst all cornerbacks in 2023.

The Kansas City Chiefs finished the 2023 NFL season first in the AFC West with an 11–6 record, clinching a playoff berth. They defeated the Miami Dolphins 26–7 in the AFC Wildcard Game and then had a 27–24 victory at the Buffalo Bills in the Divisional Round. On January 28, 2024, Sneed made five solo tackles and forced a fumble after punching out the football on a Zay Flowers reception at the one yard line to prevent a crucial touchdown during a 17–10 win at the Baltimore Ravens in the AFC Championship Game. . The play was primarily responsible for sending Kansas City to the Super Bowl. On February 11, 2024, Sneed started in Super Bowl LVIII and made three combined tackles (two solo) and a pass deflection as the Chiefs defeated the San Francisco 49ers 17–10. He won his second Super Bowl Championship when the Chiefs defeated the 49ers 25–22 in Super Bowl LVIII. He recorded three total tackles and a defended pass in the Super Bowl.

==== 2024 ====
On March 4, 2024, the Kansas City Chiefs placed the franchise tag on Sneed.

=== Tennessee Titans ===
==== 2024 ====
On March 29, 2024, the Kansas City Chiefs traded Sneed and a 2024 seventh-round pick (252nd overall) to the Tennessee Titans for a 2025 third-round pick and a 2024 seventh-round pick (229th overall). The same day, the Tennessee Titans signed Sneed to a four–year, $76.40 million contract that includes $51.50 million guaranteed, $44.00 million guaranteed upon signing, and an initial signing bonus of $20.00 million.

He entered training camp slated as the de facto No. 1 starting cornerback. Head coach Brian Callahan named Sneed and Chidobe Awuzie the starting cornerbacks to start the season. On September 8, 2024, Sneed made his debut in the Tennessee Titans' season-opener at the Chicago Bears and made four combined tackles (three solo) as the Titans lost 17–24. On October 13, 2024, Sneed collected a season-high eight combined tackles (seven solo) before exiting in the third quarter of their 17–20 loss to the Indianapolis Colts after injuring his quadriceps after taking a direct hit to his leg by a player's helmet. On November 22, 2024, the Tennessee Titans announced their decision to officially place Sneed on injured reserve for the rest of 2024 NFL season due to his quadriceps injury. He has already missed five games after his quadriceps strain was worse than it was initially thought. He ultimately did not play the rest of the season, and underwent surgery in late November. He finished his first season with the Tennessee Titans with a total of 23 combined tackles (19 solo) in five games and five starts. He received an overall grade of 36.3 from Pro Football Focus.

==== 2025 ====
On the first day of training camp, the Titans placed Sneed on Active/physically unable to perform list on July 24, 2025. On October 23, the Titans placed him on injured reserve due to a quad injury.

On March 13, 2026, Sneed was released by the Titans.

=== Kansas City Chiefs (second stint) ===
On June 9, 2026, Sneed signed a one-year, $5 million contract to return to the Kansas City Chiefs.

== Personal life ==
On November 12, 2025, Sneed was indicted by a grand jury in Dallas County, Texas, due to failing to report a felony that occurred in December 2024. On May 5, 2026, the case against Sneed was dismissed.

== NFL career statistics ==
Legend
	Won the Super Bowl
	Led the league
**Bold**	Career high

=== Regular season ===
Year	Team	Games		Tackles					Fumbles			Interceptions				
Year	Team	GP	GS	Comb	Solo	Ast	Sck	TFL	FF	FR	Yds	Int	Yds	Lng	TD	PD
2020	KC	9	6	41	31	10	2.0	2	0	0	0	**3**	42	**39**	0	7
2021	KC	15	15	76	57	19	1.0	**7**	1	**1**	0	2	2	2	0	8
2022	KC	17	17	**108**	**75**	**33**	**3.5**	5	**3**	**1**	**5**	**3**	**57**	26	0	11
2023	KC	16	16	78	60	18	0.0	5	0	**1**	0	2	4	4	0	**14**
2024	TEN	5	5	23	19	4	0.0	2	0	0	0	0	0	0	0	0
2025	TEN	7	7	26	18	8	0.0	0	0	0	0	0	0	0	0	3
2026	KC	6	4	32	22	10	0.0	0	2	1	0	0	0	0	0	3
Career		75	70	384	282	102	6.5	21	6	4	5	10	105	39	0	46

=== Postseason ===
Year	Team	Games		Tackles					Fumbles			Interceptions				
Year	Team	GP	GS	Comb	Solo	Ast	Sck	TFL	FF	FR	Yds	Int	Yds	Lng	TD	PD
2020	KC	3	3	14	9	5	**2.0**	**3**	0	0	—	0	—	—	—	0
2021	KC	3	3	**27**	**20**	**7**	0.0	1	0	0	—	**1**	0	0	0	2
2022	KC	3	3	17	10	**7**	0.0	0	0	0	—	0	—	—	—	2
2023	KC	4	4	17	14	3	0.0	0	**1**	0	—	0	—	—	—	**3**
Career		13	13	75	53	22	2.0	4	1	0	0	1	0	0	0	7
