= Nick Holz =

American football coach & player (born 1984)

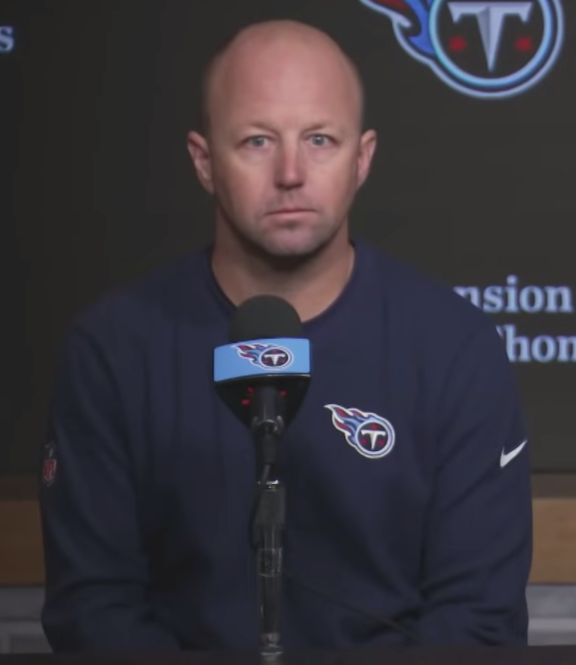
- Holz with the Tennessee Titans in 2024

Las Vegas Raiders
- Title: Pass game coordinator

Personal information
- Born: March 26, 1984 (age 42); Walnut Creek, California, U.S.
- Listed height: 5 ft 11 in (1.80 m)
- Listed weight: 180 lb (82 kg)

Career information
- Position: Wide receiver
- High school: De La Salle (Concord, California)
- College: Colorado (2002–2006)

Career history
- Nebraska (2007) Offensive quality control coach & video intern; Stanford (2008–2011) Offensive assistant, operations assistant, & assistant quarterbacks coach; Oakland / Las Vegas Raiders (2012–2021); Offensive assistant (2012-2014); Offensive quality control coach (2015-2016); Assistant wide receivers coach (2017); Offensive quality control coach (2018-2020); Assistant wide receivers coach (2021); UNLV (2022) Offensive coordinator; Jacksonville Jaguars (2023) Passing game coordinator; Tennessee Titans (2024–2025) Offensive coordinator; Las Vegas Raiders (2026–present) Passing game coordinator
- Coaching profile at Pro Football Reference

Nick Holz (born March 26, 1984) is an American professional football coach and former player who is the pass game coordinator for the Las Vegas Raiders of the National Football League (NFL). He played college football for the Colorado Buffaloes and has previously been a coach with the Nebraska Cornhuskers, Stanford Cardinal, Oakland Raiders, UNLV Rebels, Jacksonville Jaguars, and Tennessee Titans.

== Early life ==
Holz was born on March 26, 1984, in Walnut Creek, California. He grew up in Danville, California, and attended De La Salle High School in Concord, where he was teammates with Maurice Jones-Drew and Brian Callahan. Holz played football as a wide receiver at De La Salle and was named the team's Most Inspirational Player as a senior, helping them win the state championship while having 10 receptions for 93 yards.

Holz was a walk-on with the Colorado Buffaloes. He redshirted in 2002 and saw no action in 2003 before becoming the team's starting holder in 2004, a position Holz stayed in for his final three years. Holz became known as the holder for Mason Crosby for three years and was the first three-year holder at Colorado in 20 years. Holz caught his only three career passes for 29 yards in 2006 and won The Regiment Award for being the Colorado player with the "greatest contribution with the least recognition."

== Coaching career ==
=== Early career ===
After having graduated from Colorado following the 2006 season, Holz joined the Nebraska Cornhuskers in 2007 as a video intern and offensive quality control coach, having a connection to head coach Bill Callahan, whose son Holz was teammates with back in high school.

In 2008, Holz became an offensive and operations assistant with the Stanford Cardinal, and was also an assistant quarterbacks coach.

=== Oakland / Las Vegas Raiders ===
After four years at Stanford, Holz became an offensive assistant with the Oakland Raiders (later Las Vegas Raiders) of the National Football League (NFL) in 2012. He was able to coach his high school teammate Maurice Jones-Drew in the 2014 season. Holz was one of only two assistant coaches retained in 2015 and became offensive quality control coach. He became the assistant wide receivers coach in 2017, returned to offensive quality control coach in 2018, and became assistant wide receivers coach a second time in 2021.

=== UNLV Rebels ===
On February 23, 2022, Holz was hired to be the offensive coordinator for the UNLV Rebels.

=== Jacksonville Jaguars ===
On February 22, 2023, Holz was hired to be the passing game coordinator for the Jacksonville Jaguars, replacing Jim Bob Cooter.

=== Tennessee Titans ===
On February 5, 2024, Holz was hired as the offensive coordinator for the Tennessee Titans under new head coach Brian Callahan. On January 22, 2026, it was announced that Holz would not be retained under new head coach Robert Saleh.

=== Las Vegas Raiders (second stint) ===
On February 27, 2026, Holz was hired as the Las Vegas Raiders' passing game coordinator under new head coach Klint Kubiak.
