= Jarvis Brownlee Jr. =

American football player (born 2001)

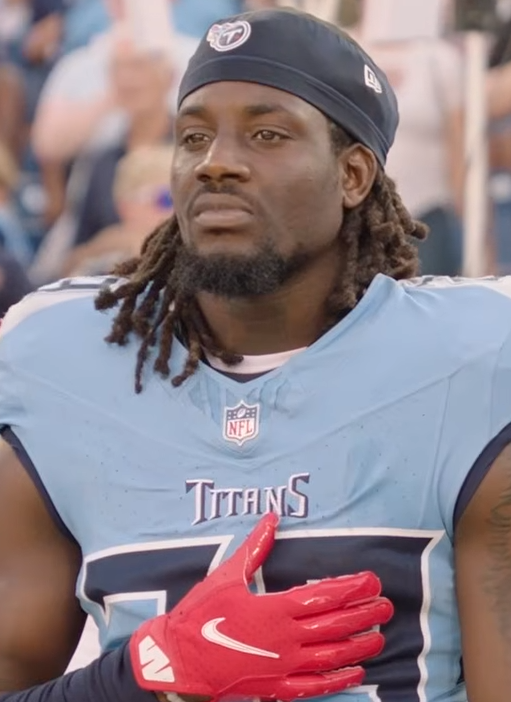
- Brownlee with the Tennessee Titans in 2024

No. 2 – New York Jets
- Position: Cornerback
- Roster status: Active

Personal information
- Born: July 13, 2001 (age 25); Miami, Florida, U.S.
- Listed height: 5 ft 10 in (1.78 m)
- Listed weight: 194 lb (88 kg)

Career information
- High school: Miami Carol City (Miami Gardens, Florida)
- College: Florida State (2019–2021); Louisville (2022–2023)
- NFL draft: 2024: 5th round, 146th overall pick

Career history
- Tennessee Titans (2024–2025); New York Jets (2025–present)

Career NFL statistics as of Week 5, 2026
- Total tackles: 141
- Sacks: 1
- Forced fumbles: 1
- Fumble recoveries: 1
- Pass deflections: 12
- Interceptions: 1
- Stats at Pro Football Reference

Jarvis Jever Brownlee Jr. (born July 13, 2001) is an American professional football cornerback for the New York Jets of the National Football League (NFL). He played college football for the Florida State Seminoles and the Louisville Cardinals.

== Early life ==
Brownlee attended high school at Miami Carol City. Coming out of high school, he was rated as a three-star recruit and the number 54 cornerback. Brownlee would initially commit to play college football for the Miami Hurricanes. However, he decided to flip his commitment to play for the Florida State Seminoles.

== College career ==
=== Florida State ===
In Brownlee's first collegiate season in 2019, he played in just one game, recording one tackle. In Week 8 of the 2020 season, Brownlee recorded his first career interception against NC State. Brownlee finished the 2020 season with 26 tackles with two being for a loss, a sack, a pass deflection, and an interception. In Week 8 of the 2021 season, Brownlee intercepted a pass which he returned for a 70-yard touchdown, as he helped Florida State rout UMass. Brownlee finished the 2021 season notching 51 tackles with two being for a loss, three pass deflections, two interceptions, a forced fumble, and a touchdown. After the end of the 2021 season, he decided to enter the NCAA transfer portal.

Brownlee finished his career at Florida State playing in 24 games with 15 starts, where he totaled 78 tackles, seven pass deflections, three interceptions, and a forced fumble.

=== Louisville ===
Brownlee decided to transfer to play for the Louisville Cardinals. In his first season with Louisville in 2022, Brownlee posted 66 tackles with two and a half being for a loss, 12 pass deflections and two interceptions. In the 2023 season, Brownlee missed three games with a foot injury, but he still recorded 30 tackles, six pass deflections, an interception and a fumble recovery. After the end of the 2023 season, Brownlee declared for the 2024 NFL draft.

== Professional career ==
Pre-draft measurables
Height	Weight	Arm length	Hand span	Wingspan	40-yard dash	10-yard split	20-yard split	20-yard shuttle	Three-cone drill	Vertical jump	Broad jump
5 ft 10 3/8 in (1.79 m)	194 lb (88 kg)	31 1/4 in (0.79 m)	9 in (0.23 m)	6 ft 3 1/4 in (1.91 m)	4.54 s	1.62 s	2.64 s	4.25 s	6.94 s	31.5 in (0.80 m)	9 ft 10 in (3.00 m)
All values from NFL Combine/Pro Day

=== Tennessee Titans ===
The Tennessee Titans selected Brownlee with the 146th pick in the fifth round of the 2024 NFL draft. Originally in possession of the Philadelphia Eagles, the Titans received the 146th pick from the Eagles after trading safety Kevin Byard for Terrell Edmunds.

Brownlee made his NFL debut in the season opener against the Chicago Bears as a rotational cornerback behind starters L'Jarius Sneed and Chidobe Awuzie, making two solo tackles his first game. Brownlee would later move into a starting position, filling in for Awuzie after he was placed on injured reserve following Week 3's game against the Green Bay Packers. On September 30, he made his first career start in a 31–12 road victory over the Miami Dolphins, recording five tackles. Brownlee made his first career interception during a Week 12 32–27 road victory over the Houston Texans, along with four tackles and three pass deflections. Brownlee played all 17 games of his rookie season, including 14 starts, and finished with 75 tackles, nine pass deflections, an interception, and a fumble recovery. Brownlee ranked third in total tackles among rookie cornerbacks.

=== New York Jets ===
On September 23, 2025, Brownlee was traded to the New York Jets in exchange for a late-round pick swap in 2026. In seven appearances (two starts) for the Jets, he logged two pass deflections, one forced fumble, and 36 combined tackles. On December 6, Brownlee was placed on injured reserve due to a hip injury suffered in Week 12 against the Baltimore Ravens.
