= James Williams (linebacker, born 2003) =

American football player (born 2003)

James Williams Sr.
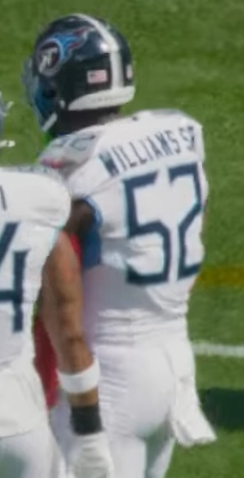
- Williams with the Tennessee Titans in 2025

No. 52 – Tennessee Titans
- Position: Linebacker
- Roster status: Injured reserve

Personal information
- Born: February 15, 2003 (age 23); Fort Lauderdale, Florida, U.S.
- Listed height: 6 ft 4 in (1.93 m)
- Listed weight: 232 lb (105 kg)

Career information
- High school: American Heritage School (Plantation, Florida)
- College: Miami (2021–2023)
- NFL draft: 2024: 7th round, 242nd overall pick

Career history
- Tennessee Titans (2024–present)

Career NFL statistics as of Week 7, 2026
- Total tackles: 55
- Sacks: 1
- Fumble recoveries: 1
- Stats at Pro Football Reference

James Williams Sr. (born February 15, 2003) is an American professional football linebacker for the Tennessee Titans of the National Football League (NFL). He played college football for the Miami Hurricanes.

== Early life ==
Williams attended American Heritage School in Plantation, Florida. As a senior in 2020, he was named the Gatorade Football Player of the Year for Florida. He was selected to play in the 2020 Under Armour All-America Game and All-American Bowl. A five star recruit, he committed to the University of Miami to play college football.

== College career ==
Williams played in 10 games and made seven starts his true freshman year for the Miami Hurricanes in 2021 as a defensive back. He finished the year with 31 tackles and two interceptions. As a sophomore in 2022, he started 10 of 11 games, recording 58 tackles and one interception. He returned to Miami for his junior year in 2023, recording 48 tackles, two forced fumbles, and an interception across 12 games.

== Professional career ==
Pre-draft measurables
Height	Weight	Arm length	Hand span	Wingspan	40-yard dash	10-yard split	20-yard split	Vertical jump	Broad jump
6 ft 4 1/4 in (1.94 m)	231 lb (105 kg)	33 5/8 in (0.85 m)	9 1/2 in (0.24 m)	6 ft 8 1/4 in (2.04 m)	4.65 s	1.59 s	2.71 s	30.0 in (0.76 m)	9 ft 9 in (2.97 m)
All values from NFL Combine

In the 2024 NFL draft, Williams was selected by the Tennessee Titans in the seventh round with the 242nd overall selection. Although initially drafted at the safety position, Williams made the switch to linebacker for his rookie season with the Titans. He appeared in 13 games during the 2024 season, making 26 tackles and a fumble recovery.
