= Jaylen Harrell =

American football player (born 2002)

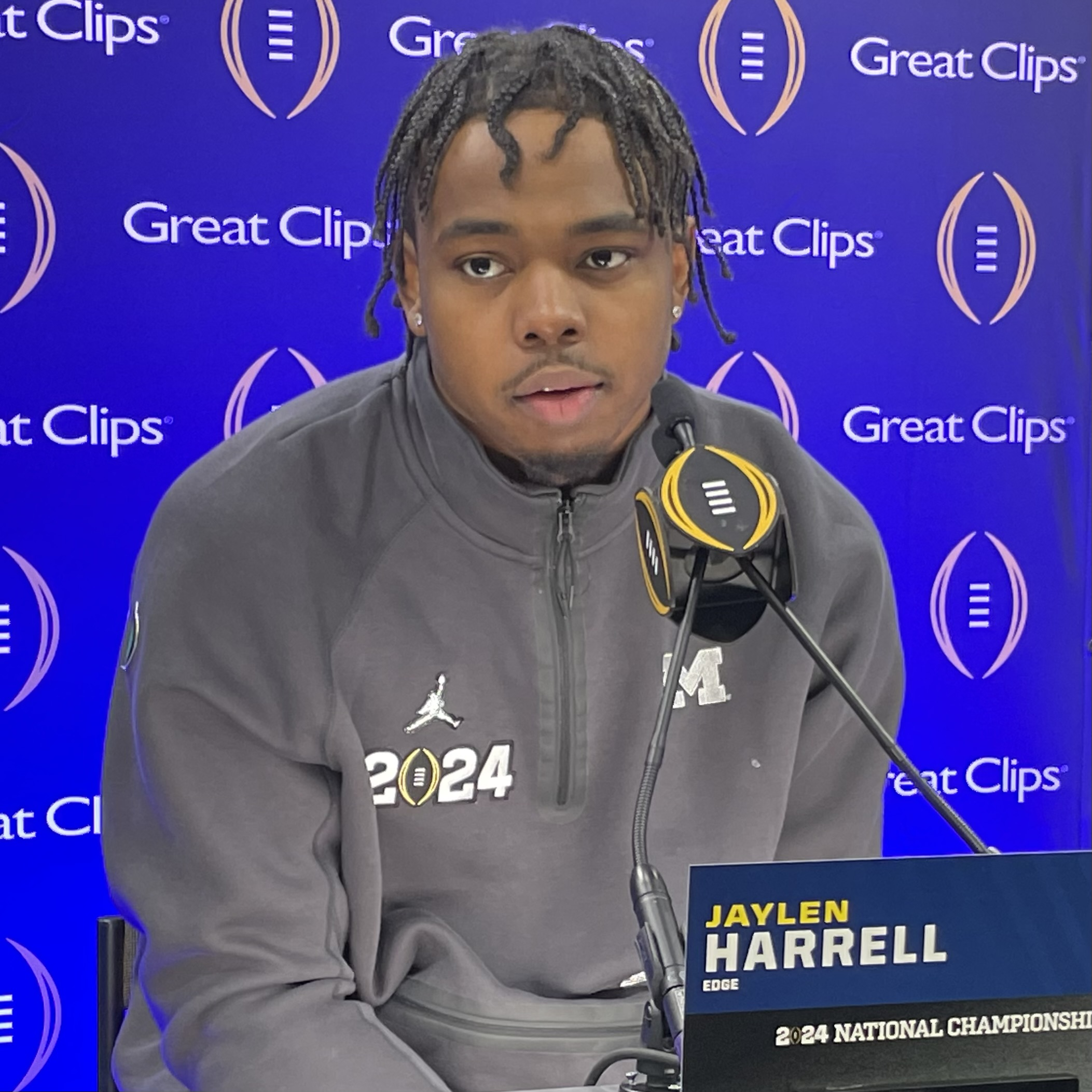
- Harrell with Michigan in 2024

No. 92 – Tennessee Titans
- Position: Linebacker
- Roster status: Injured reserve

Personal information
- Born: May 1, 2002 (age 24); Tampa, Florida, U.S.
- Listed height: 6 ft 4 in (1.93 m)
- Listed weight: 255 lb (116 kg)

Career information
- High school: Berkeley Preparatory School (Tampa, Florida)
- College: Michigan (2020–2023)
- NFL draft: 2024: 7th round, 252nd overall pick

Career history
- Tennessee Titans (2024–present)

Awards and highlights
- CFP national champion (2023)

Career NFL statistics as of 2025
- Total tackles: 38
- Sacks: 4.5
- Forced fumbles: 1
- Stats at Pro Football Reference

Jaylen Davon Harrell (born May 1, 2002) is an American professional football linebacker for the Tennessee Titans of the National Football League (NFL). He played college football for the Michigan Wolverines, winning three consecutive Big Ten Conference titles and a national championship in 2023. Harrell was selected by the Titans in the 2024 NFL draft.

== Early life ==
Harrell attended Berkeley Preparatory School in Tampa, Florida. Harrell was a MaxPreps All-American football player as a sophomore and a junior.

As a freshman, in 2016, Harrell recorded 81 tackles, with 16 tackles for a loss. As a sophomore, he registered 72 tackles, 8 tackles for a loss and 2 sacks. As a junior he posted career highs, making 106 tackles, 20 tackles for a loss and 5 sacks. In 2019, as a senior, he had 58 tackles, 11 tackles for loss and 3 sacks.

Harrell was a four star recruit, and named to the PrepStar Magazine Top 150 Dream Team, as the #137 ranked player in the nation. On December 11, 2019, he committed to the University of Michigan to play college football.

== College career ==
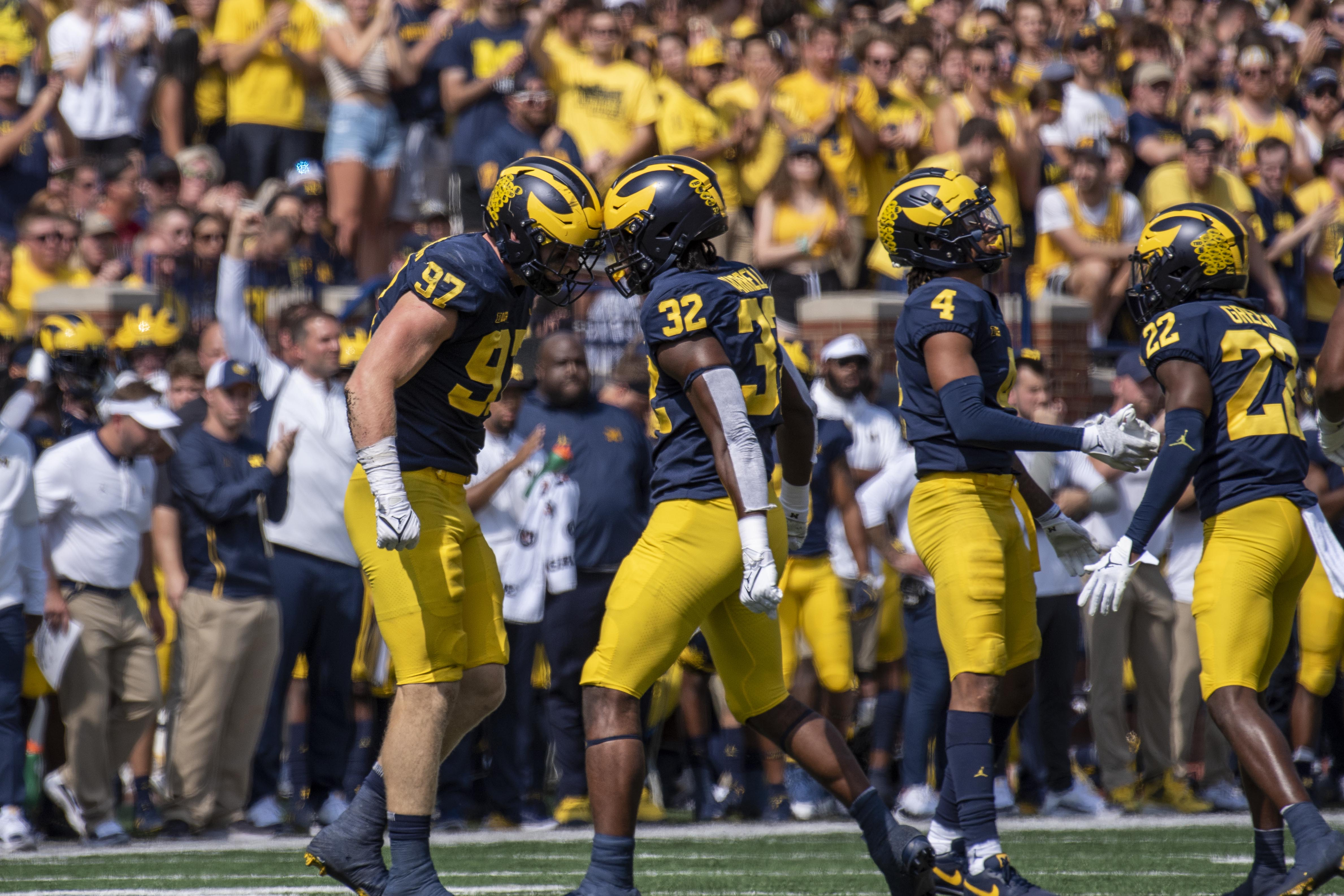
Harrell (#32) celebrates with Aidan Hutchinson (#97) in 2021.

Harrell enrolled at the University of Michigan in 2020. As a true freshman, Harrell appeared in four games and had four tackles.

As a sophomore, in 2021, he started 3 of 14 games at linebacker, recording 15 tackles. His first career start came on September 18, versus Northern Illinois.

As a junior, in 2022, he started 12 of 13 games, finishing the season with 30 tackles and 3.5 sacks. Harrell’s first career sack came on a shared sack in the season opener versus Colorado State, on September 3.

In 2023, Harrell returned to Michigan for his senior season, winning a national championship. He started all 15 games as an edge rusher, finishing with 31 tackles, 9 tackles for a loss, a team high 6.5 sacks and 2 forced fumbles. Harrell was named All-Big Ten honorable mention.

== Professional career ==
Pre-draft measurables
Height	Weight	Arm length	Hand span	Wingspan	40-yard dash	10-yard split	20-yard split	20-yard shuttle	Vertical jump	Broad jump
6 ft 3 3/4 in (1.92 m)	250 lb (113 kg)	33 1/4 in (0.84 m)	9 3/4 in (0.25 m)	6 ft 9 1/8 in (2.06 m)	4.68 s	1.64 s	2.82 s	4.39 s	37.0 in (0.94 m)	9 ft 10 in (3.00 m)
All values from NFL Combine/Pro Day

Harrell was selected in the seventh round, 252nd overall, by the Tennessee Titans in the 2024 NFL draft. Harrell began the 2024 season on special teams and third on the depth chart at weakside linebacker. He made his NFL debut in the season opener against the Chicago Bears. Harrell appeared in all 17 games for Tennessee, recording 13 tackles and one pressure.

On August 16, 2026, Harrell was placed on season–ending injured reserve due to a torn ACL in his right knee.

== NFL career statistics ==
Legend
**Bold**	Career high

=== Regular season ===
Year	Team	Games		Tackles					Interceptions						Fumbles				
Year	Team	GP	GS	Cmb	Solo	Ast	Sck	TFL	Int	Yds	Avg	Lng	TD	PD	FF	Fmb	FR	Yds	TD
2024	TEN	17	0	13	8	5	0.0	2	0	0	0.0	0	0	0	0	0	0	0	0
2025	TEN	17	2	**25**	**14**	**11**	**4.5**	**5**	0	0	0.0	0	0	0	**1**	0	0	0	0
Career		34	2	38	22	16	4.5	7	0	0	0.0	0	0	0	1	0	0	0	0

== Personal life ==
His father, James Harrell, played in the NFL.
