= Tony Pollard =

American football player (born 1997)

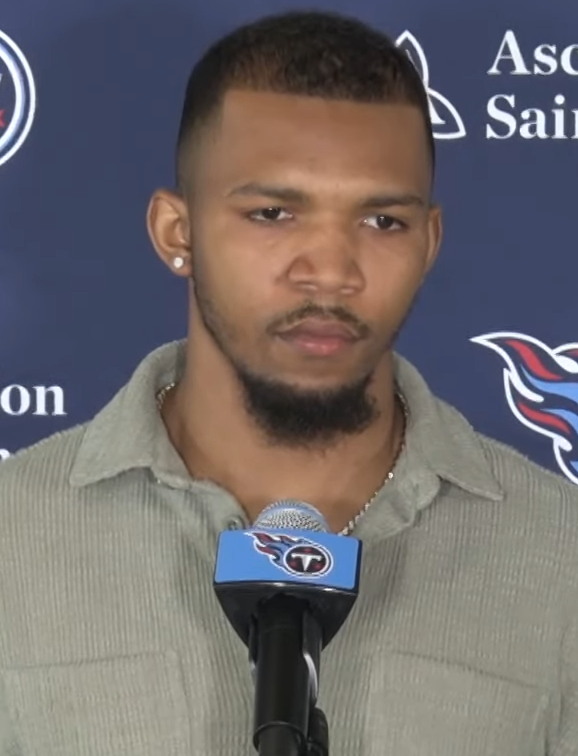
- Pollard with the Tennessee Titans in 2024

No. 20 – Tennessee Titans
- Position: Running back
- Roster status: Active

Personal information
- Born: April 30, 1997 (age 29); Memphis, Tennessee, U.S.
- Listed height: 6 ft 0 in (1.83 m)
- Listed weight: 209 lb (95 kg)

Career information
- High school: Melrose (Memphis)
- College: Memphis (2015–2018)
- NFL draft: 2019: 4th round, 128th overall pick

Career history
- Dallas Cowboys (2019–2023); Tennessee Titans (2024–present)

Awards and highlights
- Pro Bowl (2022); Consensus All-American (2017); NCAA average kickoff return yards leader (2017); 2× All-AAC (2016, 2017); 2× AAC Special Teams Player of the Year (2016, 2017); NCAA (FBS) record: Career kickoff return touchdowns: 7 (Note: Tied with Tyron Carrier, Rashaad Penny, C. J. Spiller, and Savon Scarver.)

Career NFL statistics as of Week 10, 2026
- Rushing yards: 6,410
- Rushing average: 4.6
- Receptions: 272
- Receiving yards: 1,899
- Return yards: 1,500
- Total touchdowns: 46
- Stats at Pro Football Reference

Tony Randall Pollard (born April 30, 1997) is an American professional football running back for the Tennessee Titans of the National Football League (NFL). He played college football for the Memphis Tigers and was selected by the Dallas Cowboys in the fourth round of the 2019 NFL draft.

== Early life ==
Pollard attended Melrose High School in Memphis, Tennessee, where he played high school football. As a senior, he was a two-way starter at wide receiver and cornerback for the Golden Wildcats. Pollard helped the team reach the playoffs, while amassing over 1,200 receiving yards, 20 touchdowns and being named All-District 16-AAA.

== College career ==
=== 2016 season ===
Pollard accepted a football scholarship from the University of Memphis. As a redshirt freshman, he appeared in 13 games, of which he started seven. Pollard registered 29 receptions for 298 yards (10.3-yard avg.), 31 carries for 159 yards (5.1-yard avg.) and three touchdowns. He finished among the national leaders in kickoff return average (28.1 yards). Pollard had two returns for a touchdown and was named the American Athletic Conference's Special Teams Player of the Year.

=== 2017 season ===
As a sophomore, Pollard posted 36 receptions for 536 yards (14.9-yard avg.), 30 carries for 230 yards (7.7-yard avg.) and six touchdowns. He led the nation with a school-record 40-yard average per kickoff return (22 for 881 yards) and four returns for touchdowns. Pollard repeated as the AAC's Special Teams Player of the Year.

=== 2018 season ===
Although Pollard shared the backfield with Darrell Henderson as a junior, he totaled 78 carries for 552 yards (7.1-yard avg.), 39 receptions for 458 yards (11.7-yard avg.), ten touchdowns with one kickoff return for a touchdown. In the 2018 Birmingham Bowl against Wake Forest, he recorded 318 all-purpose yards (209 on kickoff returns) and one rushing touchdown.

Pollard was considered one of the best kickoff return specialists in college football, tying a FBS record with seven career kick-return touchdowns, 87 kickoff returns (second in school history), 2,616 kickoff return yards (second in school history), 30.1 kick-return average (school record) and 4,680 all-purpose yards (second in school history).

On January 11, 2019, Pollard declared for the 2019 NFL draft. Six days later, he was added to the 2019 North Senior Bowl roster.

== Professional career ==
Pre-draft measurables
Height	Weight	Arm length	Hand span	Wingspan	40-yard dash	10-yard split	20-yard split	20-yard shuttle	Three-cone drill	Vertical jump	Broad jump	Bench press
5 ft 11 5/8 in (1.82 m)	210 lb (95 kg)	30 in (0.76 m)	9 1/2 in (0.24 m)	6 ft 1 3/4 in (1.87 m)	4.41 s	1.53 s	2.55 s	4.37 s	7.00 s	36.5 in (0.93 m)	10 ft 5 in (3.18 m)	18 reps
All values from NFL Combine/Pro Day

=== Dallas Cowboys ===
==== 2019 season ====
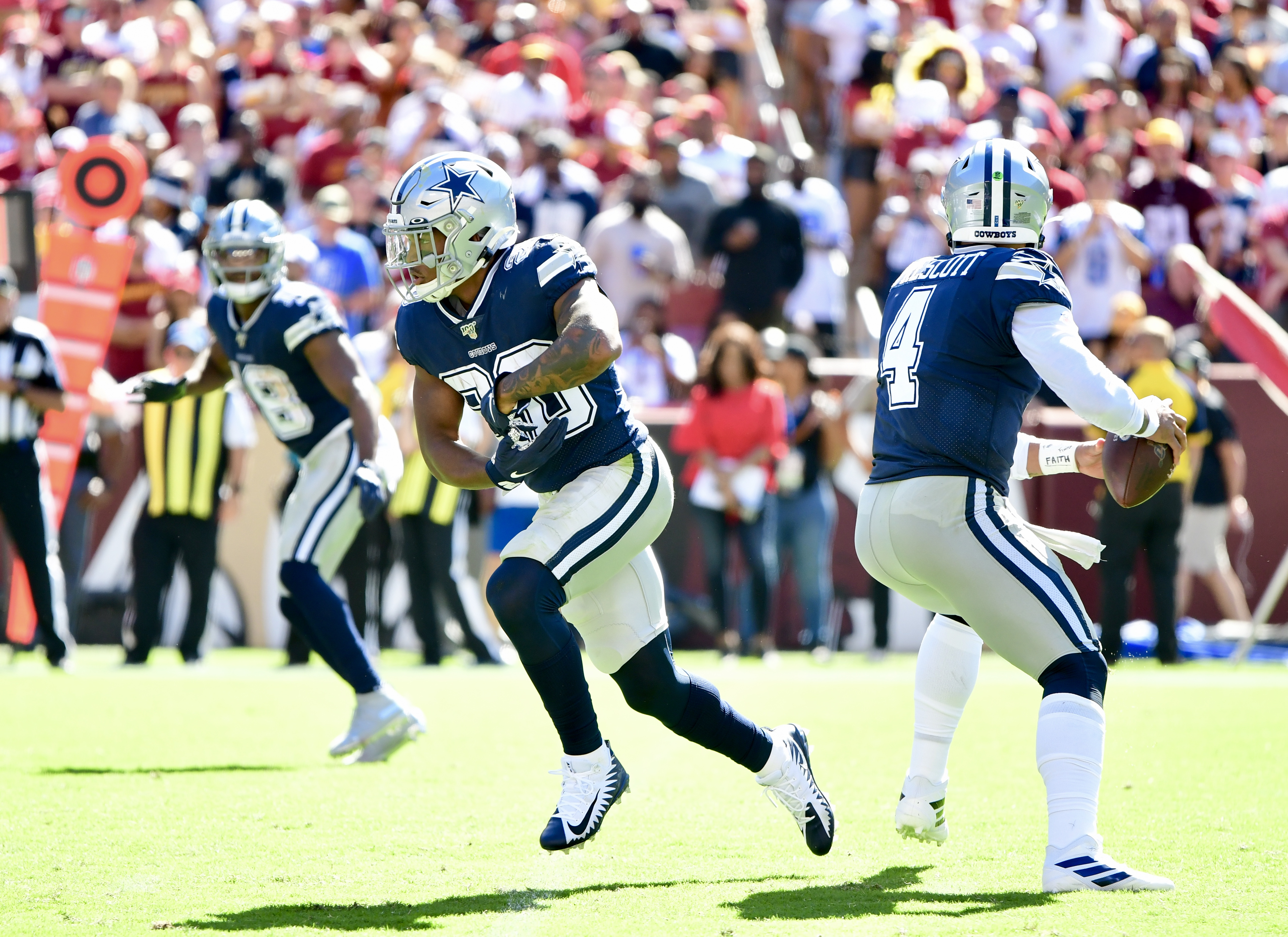
Pollard in 2019

Pollard was selected by the Dallas Cowboys in the fourth round (128th overall) in the 2019 NFL draft.

Pollard had 13 carries for 24 yards in his NFL debut during the season-opening 35–17 victory over the New York Giants. Two weeks later against the Miami Dolphins, Pollard posted his first career 100+-yard game as he finished with 13 carries for 103 yards and a touchdown in the 31–6 victory. During Week 15 against the Los Angeles Rams, Pollard finished with 12 carries for 131 yards and a 44-yard touchdown in the 44–21 victory.

Pollard finished his rookie season with 86 carries for 455 yards and two touchdowns to go along with 15 receptions for 107 yards and a touchdown in 15 games and no starts.

==== 2020 season ====
Pollard continued his role as a backup to Ezekiel Elliott to go along with some kickoff return duties in the 2020 season.

During Week 15 against the San Francisco 49ers, Pollard recorded 132 yards from scrimmage and two rushing touchdowns in the 41–33 victory.

Pollard finished his second professional season with 101 carries for 435 yards and four touchdowns to go along with 28 receptions for 193 yards and a touchdown in 16 games and two starts.

==== 2021 season ====
During Week 2 against the Los Angeles Chargers, Pollard had 137 scrimmage yards in the 20–17 victory. Three weeks later against the Giants, Pollard recorded 103 scrimmage yards in the 44–20 victory.

Pollard finished the 2021 season with 130 carries for 719 yards and two touchdowns to go along with 39 receptions for 337 yards in 15 games.

==== 2022 season ====
During Week 5 against the Rams, Pollard had a 57-yard rushing touchdown. Three weeks later against Chicago Bears, Pollard had 13 carries for 141 yards and three touchdowns in the 49–29 victory and was named FedEx Ground Player of the Week. In the next game against the Green Bay Packers, he had 22 carries for 115 rushing yards and a touchdown.

During Week 11, Pollard had 80 rushing yards and six receptions for 109 yards and two touchdowns in a 40–3 road victory over the Minnesota Vikings, earning NFC Offensive Player of the Week honors. Two weeks later, he had 12 carries for 91 yards and two touchdowns in a 54–19 victory over the Indianapolis Colts. Pollard had a rushing touchdown and a receiving touchdown in the next game, a 27–23 victory over the Houston Texans.

Pollard finished the 2022 season with 193 carries for 1,007 yards and nine touchdowns to go along with 39 receptions for 371 yards and three touchdowns in 16 games and four starts. He was named as a Pro Bowler. During the Divisional Round against the San Francisco 49ers, Pollard suffered a high ankle sprain and fractured fibula in the second quarter when 49ers defensive back Jimmie Ward landed on his ankle while making the tackle. Pollard was carted to the X-ray room with an air cast on his leg and later underwent surgery to repair the injury.

==== 2023 season ====
On March 6, 2023, the Cowboys placed the franchise tag on Pollard. He scored two touchdowns in a Week 1 victory over the New York Giants. In Week 3 against the Arizona Cardinals, he had 23 carries for 122 yards in the loss. Overall, in the 2023 season, Pollard had 252 carries for 1,005 rushing yards and six rushing touchdowns to go with 55 receptions for 311 receiving yards.

=== Tennessee Titans ===
==== 2024 season ====
Pollard signed a three-year, $21.75 million deal with the Tennessee Titans on March 14, 2024, and was named the starting running back for the 2024 season.

Pollard had 16 carries for 82 yards and a touchdown in his Titans debut during the season-opening 24–17 road loss to the Chicago Bears. In a 24–17 Week 2 loss against the New York Jets, he had 17 carries for 62 yards and five receptions for 40 yards. In a 31–12 Week 4 victory over the Miami Dolphins, he rushed 22 times for 88 yards and a touchdown. In a 20–17 Week 6 loss to the Indianapolis Colts, he had 17 carries for 93 yards and a touchdown. Pollard appeared and started in 16 games, although started missing snaps later in the season due to an ankle injury. He nonetheless finished with 260 carries for a career high 1,079 yards and five touchdowns to go along with 41 receptions for 238 yards.

==== 2025 season ====
In Week 14 of the 2025 season, Pollard had 25 carries for 161 yards and two touchdowns in the 31–29 win. In the 2025 season, he had 242 carries for 1,082 yards and five touchdowns to go with 33 receptions for 206 yards.

== Career statistics ==
=== NFL ===
Legend
**Bold**	Career high

==== Regular season ====
Year	Team	Games		Rushing					Receiving					Returning					Fumbles	
Year	Team	GP	GS	Att	Yds	Avg	Lng	TD	Rec	Yds	Avg	Lng	TD	Ret	Yds	Avg	Lng	TD	Fum	Lost
2019	DAL	15	0	86	455	5.3	44	2	15	107	7.1	21	1	14	245	17.5	30	0	1	1
2020	DAL	16	2	101	435	4.3	42	4	28	193	6.9	30	1	**32**	**766**	23.9	67	0	0	0
2021	DAL	15	0	130	719	**5.5**	58	2	39	337	8.6	32	0	17	489	**28.8**	**100**	**1**	2	0
2022	DAL	16	4	193	1,007	5.2	57	**9**	39	**371**	**9.5**	**68**	**3**	0	0	0.0	0	0	0	0
2023	DAL	17	17	252	1,005	4.0	31	6	**55**	311	5.7	60	0	0	0	0.0	0	0	3	1
2024	TEN	16	16	**260**	1,079	4.2	41	5	41	238	5.8	30	0	0	0	0.0	0	0	2	2
2025	TEN	17	17	242	**1,082**	4.5	**65**	5	33	206	6.2	29	0	0	0	0.0	0	0	**4**	**3**
2026	TEN	9	9	142	628	4.4	40	6	22	136	6.2	32	1	0	0	0.0	0	0	1	0
Career		121	65	1,406	6,410	4.6	65	39	272	1,899	7.0	68	6	63	1,500	23.8	100	1	13	7

==== Postseason ====
Year	Team	Games		Rushing					Receiving					Returning					Fumbles	
Year	Team	GP	GS	Att	Yds	Avg	Lng	TD	Rec	Yds	Avg	Lng	TD	Ret	Yds	Avg	Lng	TD	Fum	Lost
2021	DAL	1	0	4	14	3.5	8	0	2	12	**6.0**	**10**	0	**2**	**50**	**25.0**	**32**	0	0	0
2022	DAL	2	0	**21**	**99**	**4.7**	**18**	0	5	23	4.6	8	0	–	–	–	–	–	0	0
2023	DAL	1	1	15	56	3.7	11	**1**	**7**	**29**	4.1	9	0	–	–	–	–	–	0	0
Career		4	1	40	169	4.2	18	1	14	64	4.6	10	0	2	50	25.0	32	0	0	0

=== College ===
Legend
	NCAA record
	Led the NCAA
**Bold**	Career high

Season	Team	Pos	GP	Rushing				Receiving				Kickoff returns			
Season	Team	Pos	GP	Att	Yds	Avg	TD	Rec	Yds	Avg	TD	Ret	Yds	Avg	TD
2015	Memphis	WR	0	Redshirt											
2016	Memphis	WR	13	31	159	5.1	1	29	298	10.3	2	**38**	**1,068**	28.1	2
2017	Memphis	RB	13	36	536	**14.9**	2	30	230	7.7	**4**	22	881	**40.0**	**4**
2018	Memphis	RB	14	**78**	**552**	7.1	**6**	**39**	**458**	**11.7**	3	27	667	24.7	1
Career			40	106	1,153	10.8	6	137	1,080	7.9	12	87	2,616	30.1	7
