= Bo Hardegree =

American football player and coach (born 1984)

Buffalo Bills
- Title: Quarterbacks coach

Personal information
- Born: July 5, 1984 (age 42); Jackson, Tennessee, U.S.

Career information
- Position: Quarterback
- High school: Jackson Central-Merry
- College: Tennessee (2003–2006)

Career history
- Duke (2008–2010) Graduate assistant; LSU (2011–2013); Defensive coaching intern (2011); Offensive coaching intern (2012–2013); Denver Broncos (2014) Offensive quality control coach; Chicago Bears (2015) Offensive assistant; Miami Dolphins (2016–2018) Quarterbacks coach; New York Jets (2019–2020) Offensive assistant; New England Patriots (2021) Offensive assistant; Las Vegas Raiders (2022–2023); Quarterbacks coach (2022); Quarterbacks coach & interim offensive coordinator (2023); Tennessee Titans (2024–2025) Quarterbacks coach; Buffalo Bills (2026–present) Quarterbacks coach
- Coaching profile at Pro Football Reference

Bo Hardegree (born July 5, 1984) is an American football coach who is the quarterbacks coach for the Buffalo Bills of the National Football League (NFL). He had previously served as an assistant coach for the Tennessee Titans, Las Vegas Raiders, New England Patriots, Miami Dolphins, Denver Broncos, Chicago Bears, and New York Jets.

== Early life and playing career ==
Hardegree grew up in Jackson, Tennessee and played football for his father at Jackson Central-Merry High School. Hardegree was a reserve quarterback for the Tennessee Volunteers from 2003 to 2006, appearing in one game before switching sports and playing for the school's tennis team.

== Coaching career ==
=== Early career ===
Hardegree began coaching in 2007 as student assistant at Tennessee before serving as a graduate assistant at Duke University from 2008-2010 under David Cutcliffe. He interned at the LSU coaching staff from 2011 to 2013.

=== Denver Broncos ===
In 2014, Hardegree was hired by the Denver Broncos as an offensive quality control coach under head coach John Fox.

=== Chicago Bears ===
In 2015, Hardegree joined the Chicago Bears as an offensive assistant, following head coach John Fox.

=== Miami Dolphins ===
In 2016, Hardegree was hired by the Miami Dolphins as the quarterbacks coach under head coach Adam Gase.

=== New York Jets ===
In 2019, Hardegree followed Gase to join the New York Jets as an offensive assistant.

=== New England Patriots ===
In 2021, Hardegree was hired by the New England Patriots as an offensive assistant under head coach Bill Belichick.

=== Las Vegas Raiders ===
In 2022, Hardegree was hired by the Las Vegas Raiders as the quarterbacks coach under head coach Josh McDaniels.

On October 31, 2023, Hardegree was promoted to interim offensive coordinator following the firing of head McDaniels, general manager Dave Ziegler, and offensive coordinator Mick Lombardi.

On January 19, 2024, new Raiders head coach Antonio Pierce announced he would not retain Hardgree for the upcoming season.

=== Tennessee Titans ===
On February 14, 2024, Hardegree was hired by the Tennessee Titans as the quarterbacks coach under new head coach Brian Callahan. This move marked a return to his home state of Tennessee, where he also played college football for the Tennessee Volunteers.

On September 23, 2025, Callahan announced he was relinquishing offensive play calling duties to Hardegree.

=== Buffalo Bills ===
On February 3, 2026, Hardegree was hired by the Buffalo Bills as the team's quarterbacks coach under new head coach Joe Brady.

== Personal life ==
A native of Jackson, Tennessee, Hardegree is married to Lauren, a pediatric radiologist. The couple have two children together.
