= Brian Callahan =

American football coach (born 1984)

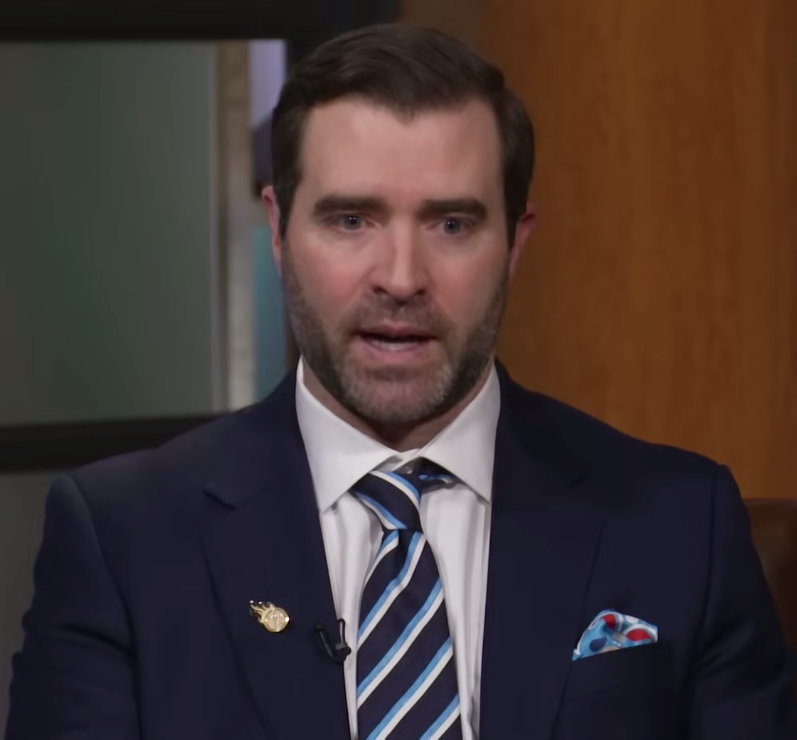
- Callahan with the Tennessee Titans in 2024

New York Giants
- Title: Quarterbacks coach, Passing game coordinator

Personal information
- Born: June 10, 1984 (age 42); Champaign, Illinois, U.S.

Career information
- Position: Quarterback
- High school: De La Salle (Concord, California)
- College: UCLA (2002–2005)

Career history
- UCLA (2006–2007) Graduate assistant; Junípero Serra HS (CA) (2008–2009) Offensive coordinator & quarterbacks coach; Denver Broncos (2010–2015); Coaching assistant (2010); Offensive quality control coach (2011–2012); Offensive assistant (2013–2015); Detroit Lions (2016–2017) Quarterbacks coach; Oakland Raiders (2018) Quarterbacks coach; Cincinnati Bengals (2019–2023) Offensive coordinator; Tennessee Titans (2024–2025) Head coach; New York Giants (2026–present) Quarterbacks coach & passing game coordinator

Awards and highlights
- Super Bowl champion (50)

Head coaching record
- Regular season: 4–19 (.174)
- Coaching profile at Pro Football Reference

Brian Callahan (born June 10, 1984) is an American professional football coach who is currently the quarterbacks coach and passing game coordinator for the New York Giants of the National Football League (NFL). He previously served as the head coach for the Tennessee Titans from 2024 to 2025. Before his hiring as a head coach, Callahan served as the offensive coordinator for the Cincinnati Bengals from 2019 to 2023.

Callahan played college football for the UCLA Bruins and began his coaching career with them as a graduate assistant. Callahan began serving with the Denver Broncos in 2010 and was part of the team that won Super Bowl 50. After the Broncos' Super Bowl victory, Callahan served as the quarterbacks coach for the Detroit Lions and Oakland Raiders. He is the son of NFL coach Bill Callahan.

== Early life and education ==
Born in Champaign, Illinois, Callahan attended De La Salle High School in Concord, California, before attending the University of California, Los Angeles (UCLA), where he played for the Bruins as a quarterback and holder from 2002 to 2005. While at UCLA, Callahan earned a bachelor's degree in sociology in 2006 and a master's degree in education in 2008.

== Coaching career ==
=== Early career ===
In 2006, Callahan began his coaching career as a graduate assistant with the UCLA Bruins. Callahan served as the offensive coordinator and quarterbacks coach at Junípero Serra High School in San Mateo, California from 2008 to 2009.

=== Denver Broncos ===
In 2010, Callahan was hired by the Denver Broncos as a coaching assistant. He held various positions with them through the 2015 season. Callahan was part of the Broncos staff when the team won Super Bowl 50 over the Carolina Panthers.

=== Detroit Lions ===
On February 12, 2016, Callahan was hired by the Detroit Lions as their quarterbacks coach.

=== Oakland Raiders ===
On January 27, 2018, Callahan was hired by the Oakland Raiders as their quarterbacks coach.

=== Cincinnati Bengals ===
On February 7, 2019, Callahan was hired by the Cincinnati Bengals as their offensive coordinator. During his time in Cincinnati, the team made it to Super Bowl LVI but lost to the Los Angeles Rams 23–20. The following season in 2022, the Bengals made it to the AFC Championship Game, but lost to the eventual Super Bowl LVII champion Kansas City Chiefs.

=== Tennessee Titans ===
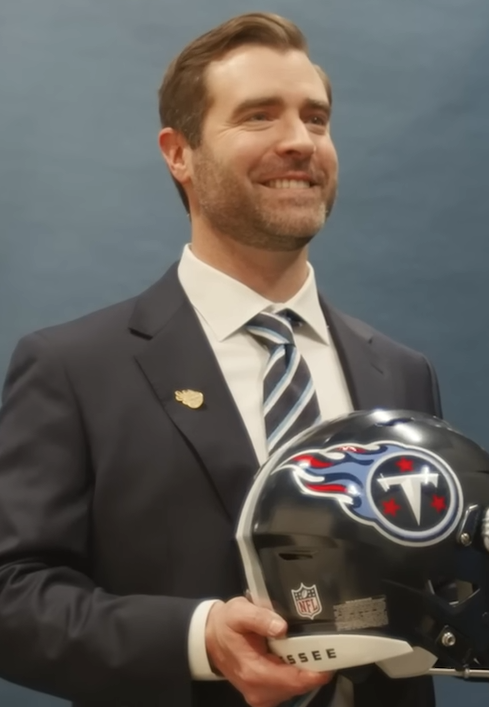
Callahan in 2024

On January 22, 2024, Callahan was hired by the Tennessee Titans as their head coach. He secured his first win as a head coach during Week 4 on Monday Night Football when the Titans defeated the Miami Dolphins 31–12 on the road. Callahan led the Titans to a 3–14 record in his first season as head coach. This record landed them with the first overall pick in the 2025 NFL Draft, which was used to select Miami quarterback Cam Ward.

Through the first four weeks of the 2025 season, the Titans put up a league-worst deficit of 69 points (51 points scored, with 120 points made against). This was capped by a Week 4 26–0 shutout road loss to the Houston Texans, giving Houston their first win of the season. Following a Week 3 42–20 loss to the Indianapolis Colts, Callahan handed offensive playcalling duties to quarterbacks coach Bo Hardegree. On October 13, 2025, Callahan was fired by the Titans following a 1–5 start to the season for the second consecutive year. He finished his tenure in Tennessee with a 4–19 (.174) record, winning only one home game (against the New England Patriots in 2024) in less than two seasons.

=== New York Giants ===
On February 18, 2026, Callahan was hired by the New York Giants to be their quarterbacks coach and passing game coordinator under new head coach John Harbaugh.

== Head coaching record ==
| Team | Year | Regular season | | | | | Postseason | | | |
| Team | Year | Won | Lost | Ties | Win % | Finish | Won | Lost | Win % | Result |
|---|---|---|---|---|---|---|---|---|---|---|
| TEN | 2024 | 3 | 14 | 0 | .176 | 4th in AFC South | — | — | — | — |
| TEN | 2025 | 1 | 5 | 0 | .167 | Fired | — | — | — | — |
| Total | | 4 | 19 | 0 | .174 | | 0 | 0 | .000 | |

== Personal life ==
Callahan and his wife, Allyson, have two children: Norah and Ronan.

Callahan is the son of Bill Callahan, the former head coach of the Oakland Raiders and the Nebraska Cornhuskers. Upon Callahan's hiring as head coach of the Tennessee Titans, his father left his job with the Cleveland Browns, to join his son's coaching staff as offensive line coach.
