= NFL Top 100 Players of 2024 =

NFL Players list

- Season 2024
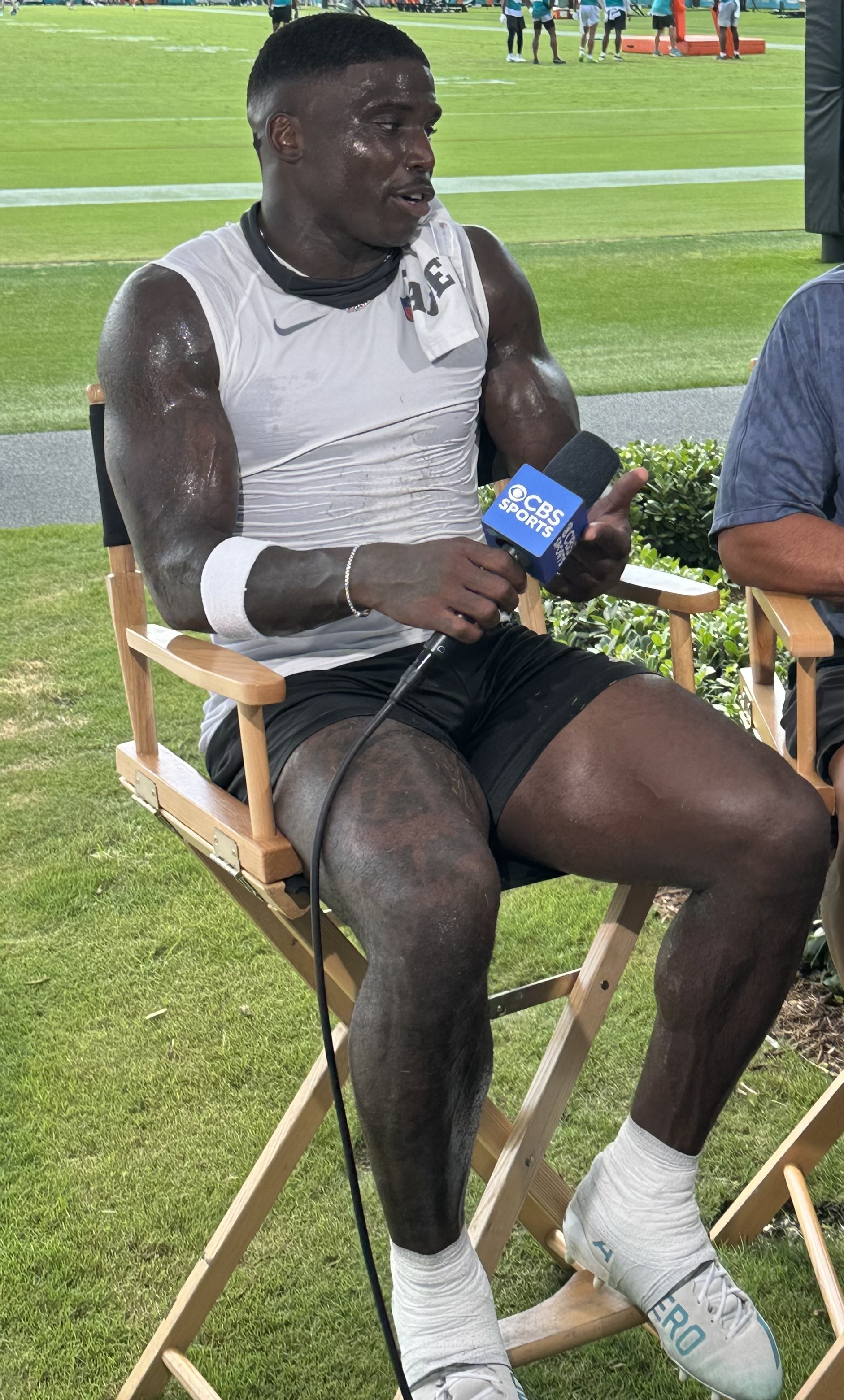
- Tyreek Hill, the number one-ranked player

Release
- Original network: NFL+ (100–11); NFL Network (10–1)
- Original release: July 22 – August 2, 2024

Season chronology
- ← Previous; 2023 Next → 2025

The NFL Top 100 Players of 2024 is the fourteenth season in the NFL Top 100. It premiered on July 22, 2024, and concluded on August 2, 2024. Miami Dolphins wide receiver Tyreek Hill was ranked the top player of 2024, the first in his career. The Carolina Panthers and New England Patriots were the only teams to not have a player featured on the list.

== Episode list ==
Episode No.	Air date	Original network	Numbers revealed
1	July 22	NFL+	100–81
2	July 23	NFL+	80–71
3	July 24	NFL+	70–61
4	July 25	NFL+	60–51
5	July 26	NFL+	50–41
6	July 29	NFL+	40–31
7	July 30	NFL+	30–21
8	July 31	NFL+	20–11
9	August 2	NFLN	10–1

== The list ==
Rank	Player	Position	2023 team	2024 team	Rank change	Reference	Year accomplishments
1	Tyreek Hill	Wide receiver	Miami Dolphins		▲6		First-team All-Pro; Pro Bowl selection; 1,799 receiving yards (league leader); 13 receiving touchdowns (league leader); 1st-Team All-Pro; Selected to 8th Pro Bowl
2	Lamar Jackson	Quarterback	Baltimore Ravens		▲70		Most Valuable Player; First-team All-Pro; Pro Bowl selection; 5.5 rushing yards per attempt (league leader); 3,678 passing yards; 24 passing touchdowns; 821 rushing yards; 5 rushing touchdowns
3	Christian McCaffrey	Running back	San Francisco 49ers		▲32		NFL Offensive Player of the Year Award; First-team All-Pro; Pro Bowl selection; 1,459 rushing yards (league leader); 14 rushing touchdowns; 564 receiving yards; 7 receiving touchdowns
4	Patrick Mahomes	Quarterback	Kansas City Chiefs		▼3		Super Bowl champion; Super Bowl MVP; Pro Bowl selection; 4,183 passing yards; 27 passing touchdowns; 389 rushing yards
5	Myles Garrett	Defensive end	Cleveland Browns		▲15		NFL Defensive Player of the Year Award; First-team All-Pro; Pro Bowl selection; 42 combined tackles; 14.0 sacks; 3 passes defended; 4 forced fumbles; 1 fumble recovery
6	Chris Jones	Defensive tackle	Kansas City Chiefs		▲4		Super Bowl champion; 20 solo tackles; 10.5 sacks; 4 passes defended; 1st-Team All Pro; Selected to 5th Pro Bowl
7	Trent Williams	Offensive tackle	San Francisco 49ers		▲7		1st-Team All Pro; Selected to 11th Pro Bowl
8	T. J. Watt	Linebacker	Pittsburgh Steelers		▲19		48 solo tackles; 19.0 sacks (league leader); 1 interception; 8 passes defended; 4 forced fumbles; 3 fumble recoveries; 1st-Team All Pro; Selected to 6th Pro Bowl
9	Travis Kelce	Tight end	Kansas City Chiefs		▼4		Super Bowl champion; 93 receptions; 984 receiving yards; 5 receiving touchdowns; Selected to 9th Pro Bowl
10	Maxx Crosby	Defensive end	Las Vegas Raiders		▲7		55 solo tackles; 14.5 sacks; 2 passes defended; 2 forced fumbles; 1 fumble recovery; 2nd-Team All Pro; Selected to 3rd Pro Bowl
11	Fred Warner	Linebacker	San Francisco 49ers		▲4		82 solo tackles; 2.5 sacks; 4 interceptions; 11 passes defended; 4 forced fumbles; 1st-Team All Pro; Selected to 3rd Pro Bowl
12	Josh Allen	Quarterback	Buffalo Bills		▼4		4,306 passing yards; 29 passing touchdowns; 524 rushing yards; 15 rushing touchdowns
13	CeeDee Lamb	Wide receiver	Dallas Cowboys		▲21		135 receptions; 1,749 receiving yards; 12 receiving touchdowns; 1st-Team All Pro; Selected to 3rd Pro Bowl
14	George Kittle	Tight end	San Francisco 49ers		▲5		65 receptions; 1,020 receiving yards; 6 receiving touchdowns; 1st-Team All Pro; Selected to 5th Pro Bowl
15	Jalen Hurts	Quarterback	Philadelphia Eagles		▼12		3,858 passing yards; 23 passing touchdowns; 605 rushing yards; 15 rushing touchdowns; Selected to 2nd Pro Bowl
16	Dak Prescott	Quarterback	Dallas Cowboys		▲40		4,516 passing yards; 36 passing touchdowns; Selected to 3rd Pro Bowl; 2nd-Team All-Pro
17	Micah Parsons	Linebacker	Dallas Cowboys		▼8		36 solo tackles; 14.0 sacks; 2 passes defended; 1 forced fumble; 1 fumble recovery; 2nd-Team All Pro; Selected to 3rd Pro Bowl
18	Justin Jefferson	Wide receiver	Minnesota Vikings		▼16		68 receptions; 1,074 receiving yards; 5 receiving touchdowns
19	Roquan Smith	Linebacker	Baltimore Ravens		▲5		84 solo tackles; 1.5 sacks; 1 interception; 8 passes defended; 1 forced fumble; 1st-Team All Pro; Selected to 2nd Pro Bowl
20	C. J. Stroud	Quarterback	Houston Texans		NR		4,108 passing yards; 23 passing touchdowns; Selected to 1st Pro Bowl; Offensive Rookie of the Year
21	A. J. Brown	Wide receiver	Philadelphia Eagles		▲1		106 receptions; 1,456 receiving yards; 7 receiving touchdowns; 2nd-Team All Pro; Selected to 3rd Pro Bowl
22	Penei Sewell	Offensive tackle	Detroit Lions		NR		1st-Team All Pro; Selected to 2nd Pro Bowl
23	Amon-Ra St. Brown	Wide receiver	Detroit Lions		▲44		119 receptions; 1,515 receiving yards; 10 receiving touchdowns; 1st-Team All Pro; Selected to 2nd Pro Bowl
24	Dexter Lawrence	Defensive tackle	New York Giants		▲4		32 solo tackles; 4.5 sacks; 2 pass defended; 2nd-Team All Pro; Selected to 2nd Pro Bowl
25	Jalen Ramsey	Cornerback	Miami Dolphins		▲11		18 solo tackles; 3 interceptions; 5 pass defended; Selected to 7th Pro Bowl
26	Mike Evans	Wide receiver	Tampa Bay Buccaneers		▲27		79 receptions; 1,255 receiving yards; 13 receiving touchdowns (league leader); 2nd-Team All Pro; Selected to 5th Pro Bowl
27	Nick Bosa	Defensive end	San Francisco 49ers		▼23		34 solo tackles; 10.5 sacks; 4 passes defended; 2 forced fumbles; 1 fumble recovery; Selected to 4th Pro Bowl
28	Brock Purdy	Quarterback	San Francisco 49ers		NR		4,280 yards passing; 31 touchdown passes; Selected to 1st Pro Bowl
29	Khalil Mack	Linebacker	Los Angeles Chargers		▲9		57 solo tackles; 17.0 sacks; 10 passes defended; 5 forced fumbles; Selected to 8th Pro Bowl
30	Deebo Samuel	Wide receiver	San Francisco 49ers		▲31		60 receptions; 892 receiving yards; 7 receiving touchdowns
31	DaRon Bland	Cornerback	Dallas Cowboys		NR		53 solo tackles; 9 interceptions (league leader); 5 interception returned for touchdowns (NFL record); 15 passes defended; 1st-Team All Pro; Selected to 1st Pro Bowl
32	Quincy Williams	Linebacker	New York Jets		NR		95 solo tackles; 2.0 sacks; 1 interception; 10 passes defended; 2 forced fumble; 1 fumble recovery; 1st-Team All Pro
33	Puka Nacua	Wide receiver	Los Angeles Rams		NR		105 receptions (NFL rookie record); 1,486 receiving yards (NFL rookie record); 6 receiving touchdowns; 2nd-Team All Pro; Selected to 1st Pro Bowl
34	Jordan Love	Quarterback	Green Bay Packers		NR		4,159 yards passing; 32 touchdown passes
35	Josh Hines-Allen	Linebacker	Jacksonville Jaguars		NR		43 solo tackles; 17.5 sacks; 1 interception; 1 pass defended; 2 forced fumbles; Selected to 2nd Pro Bowl
36	Tua Tagovailoa	Quarterback	Miami Dolphins		▲46		4,624 yards passing (league leader); 29 touchdown passes; Selected to 1st Pro Bowl
37	Quinnen Williams	Defensive tackle	New York Jets		▲3		39 solo tackles; 5.5 sacks; 1 interception; 3 passes defended; 1 forced fumble; 1 fumble recovery; Selected to 2nd Pro Bowl
38	Sauce Gardner	Cornerback	New York Jets		▼15		41 solo tackles; 11 passes defended; 1 forced fumble; 1st-Team All Pro; Selected to 2nd Pro Bowl
39	Joe Burrow	Quarterback	Cincinnati Bengals		▼33		2,309 yards passing; 15 touchdown passes
40	Davante Adams	Wide receiver	Las Vegas Raiders	Las Vegas Raiders/New York Jets	▼27		103 receptions; 1,114 receiving yards; 8 receiving touchdowns
41	Lane Johnson	Offensive tackle	Philadelphia Eagles		0		2nd-Team All Pro; Selected to 5th Pro Bowl
42	Matthew Stafford	Quarterback	Los Angeles Rams		NR		3,965 yards passing; 24 touchdown passes; Selected to 2nd Pro Bowl
43	Kyle Hamilton	Safety	Baltimore Ravens		NR		63 solo tackles; 3.0 sacks; 4 interceptions; 13 passes defended; 1 forced fumble; 1st-Team All Pro; Selected to 1st Pro Bowl
44	Demario Davis	Linebacker	New Orleans Saints		▼1		47 solo tackles; 6.5 sacks; 4 passes defended; 1 forced fumble; 1 fumble recovery; 2nd-Team All Pro; Selected to 2nd Pro Bowl
45	Ja'Marr Chase	Wide receiver	Cincinnati Bengals		▼6		100 receptions; 1,216 receiving yards; 7 receiving touchdowns; Selected to 3rd Pro Bowl
46	Antoine Winfield Jr.	Safety	Tampa Bay Buccaneers		NR		46 solo tackles; 6.0 sacks; 3 interceptions; 12 passes defended; 6 forced fumbles (league leader); 4 fumble recoveries; 1st-Team All Pro
47	Aidan Hutchinson	Defensive end	Detroit Lions		▲41		36 solo tackles; 11.5 sacks; 1 interception; 7 passes defended; 3 forced fumbles; 2 fumble recoveries; Selected to 1st Pro Bowl
48	Jared Goff	Quarterback	Detroit Lions		▲18		4,575 yards passing; 30 touchdown passes
49	Derrick Henry	Running back	Tennessee Titans	Baltimore Ravens	▼24		1,167 yards rushing; 12 rushing TDs; Selected to 4th Pro Bowl
50	Rashan Gary	Defensive end	Green Bay Packers		NR		23 solo tackles; 9.0 sacks; 2 passes defended; 2 forced fumbles; 2 fumble recoveries
51	Keenan Allen	Wide receiver	Los Angeles Chargers	Chicago Bears	NR		108 receptions; 1,243 receiving yards; 7 receiving touchdowns; Selected to 6th Pro Bowl
52	Patrick Surtain II	Cornerback	Denver Broncos		▼3		59 solo tackles; 1 interception; 12 passes defended; Selected to 2nd Pro Bowl
53	Zack Martin	Guard	Dallas Cowboys		▲15		1st-Team All Pro; Selected to 9th Pro Bowl
54	Jonathan Allen	Defensive tackle	Washington Commanders		▼2		30 solo tackles; 5.5 sacks; 1 pass defended
55	Brian Burns	Linebacker	Carolina Panthers	New York Giants	▼1		32 solo tackles; 8.0 sacks; 2 passes defended; 1 forced fumble; 1 fumble recovery
56	Stefon Diggs	Wide receiver	Buffalo Bills	Houston Texans	▼40		107 receptions; 1,183 receiving yards; 8 receiving touchdowns; Selected to 4th Pro Bowl
57	Justin Simmons	Safety	Denver Broncos	Atlanta Falcons	▲2		53 solo tackles; 1.0 sack; 3 interceptions; 8 passes defended; 2 forced fumbles; 1 fumble recovery; 2nd-Team All Pro; Selected to 2nd Pro Bowl
58	Christian Wilkins	Defensive tackle	Miami Dolphins	Las Vegas Raiders	▲23		38 solo tackles; 9.0 sacks; 2 passes defended; 1 forced fumble; 2 fumble recoveries
59	Bobby Wagner	Linebacker	Seattle Seahawks	Washington Commanders	▲3		96 solo tackles; 3.5 sacks; 3 passes defended; 1 fumble recovery; 2nd-Team All Pro; Selected to 9th Pro Bowl
60	Raheem Mostert	Running back	Miami Dolphins		NR		1,144 yards rushing; 18 rushing TDs (league leader); Selected to 1st Pro Bowl
61	Justin Madubuike	Defensive tackle	Baltimore Ravens		NR		38 solo tackles; 13.0 sacks; 1 forced fumble; 2nd-Team All Pro; Selected to 1st Pro Bowl
62	Bradley Chubb	Linebacker	Miami Dolphins		NR		45 solo tackles; 11.0 sacks; 2 passes defended; 6 forced fumbles (league leader); 2 fumble recoveries
63	Jaylen Waddle	Wide receiver	Miami Dolphins		▼19		72 receptions; 1,014 receiving yards; 4 receiving touchdowns
64	Patrick Queen	Linebacker	Baltimore Ravens	Pittsburgh Steelers	NR		84 solo tackles; 3.5 sacks; 1 Interception; 6 passes defended; 1 forced fumble; 1 fumble recovery; 2nd-Team All Pro; Selected to 1st Pro Bowl
65	Jordan Poyer	Safety	Buffalo Bills	Miami Dolphins	▼8		66 solo tackles; 1.0 sack; 4 passes defended; 1 forced fumble
66	Brandon Aiyuk	Wide receiver	San Francisco 49ers		NR		75 receptions; 1,342 receiving yards; 7 receiving touchdowns; 2nd-Team All Pro
67	Terron Armstead	Offensive tackle	Miami Dolphins		▲16		Selected to 5th Pro Bowl
68	Danielle Hunter	Defensive end	Minnesota Vikings	Houston Texans	NR		54 solo tackles; 16.5 sacks; 2 passes defended; 4 forced fumbles; Selected to 4th Pro Bowl
69	Cooper Kupp	Wide receiver	Los Angeles Rams		▼22		59 receptions; 737 receiving yards; 5 receiving touchdowns
70	Amari Cooper	Wide receiver	Cleveland Browns	Cleveland Browns/Buffalo Bills	NR		72 receptions; 1,250 receiving yards; 5 receiving touchdowns; Selected to 5th Pro Bowl
71	Laremy Tunsil	Offensive tackle	Houston Texans		▲14		Selected to 4th Pro Bowl
72	Garrett Wilson	Wide receiver	New York Jets		▲2		95 receptions; 1,042 receiving yards; 3 receiving touchdowns
73	Jeffery Simmons	Defensive tackle	Tennessee Titans		▼15		30 solo tackles; 5.5 sacks; 1 pass defended; 1 forced fumble; 1 fumble recovery
74	Jessie Bates	Safety	Atlanta Falcons		NR		89 solo tackles; 6 Interceptions; 11 passes defended; 3 forced fumbles; Selected to 1st Pro Bowl
75	Justin Herbert	Quarterback	Los Angeles Chargers		▼43		3,134 yards passing; 20 touchdown passes
76	Dre Greenlaw	Linebacker	San Francisco 49ers		▲3		75 solo tackles; 1.5 sacks; 4 passes defended
77	Trey Hendrickson	Defensive end	Cincinnati Bengals		▼2		28 solo tackles; 17.5 sacks; 3 passes defended; 3 forced fumbles; Selected to 3rd Pro Bowl
78	Kyren Williams	Running back	Los Angeles Rams		NR		1,144 yards rushing; 12 rushing TDs; 2nd-Team All-Pro; Selected to 1st Pro Bowl
79	Minkah Fitzpatrick	Safety	Pittsburgh Steelers		▼61		43 solo tackles; 3 passes defended; Selected to 4th Pro Bowl
80	Sam LaPorta	Tight end	Detroit Lions		NR		86 receptions; 889 receiving yards; 10 receiving touchdowns; 2nd-Team All-Pro; Selected to 1st Pro Bowl
81	Kirk Cousins	Quarterback	Minnesota Vikings	Atlanta Falcons	▼39		2,331 yards passing; 18 touchdown passes
82	Montez Sweat	Defensive end	Washington Commanders / Chicago Bears	Chicago Bears	NR		38 solo tackles; 12.5 sacks; 4 passes defended; 3 forced fumbles; Selected to 1st Pro Bowl
83	Derwin James	Safety	Los Angeles Chargers		▼53		86 solo tackles; 2.0 sacks; 1 Interception; 7 passes defended; 2 forced fumbles; 2 fumble recoveries
84	DK Metcalf	Wide receiver	Seattle Seahawks		NR		66 receptions; 1,148 yards receiving; 8 TD receptions; Selected to 2nd Pro Bowl
85	Tristan Wirfs	Offensive tackle	Tampa Bay Buccaneers		▲13		Selected to 3rd Pro Bowl
86	Saquon Barkley	Running back	New York Giants	Philadelphia Eagles	▼55		962 yards rushing; 8 rushing TDs
87	Haason Reddick	Linebacker	Philadelphia Eagles	New York Jets	▼39		29 solo tackles; 11.0 sacks; 1 pass defended; Selected to 2nd Pro Bowl
88	Chris Lindstrom	Guard	Atlanta Falcons		▼1		2nd-Team All-Pro; Selected to 2nd Pro Bowl
89	Budda Baker	Safety	Arizona Cardinals		▼16		58 solo tackles; Selected to 6th Pro Bowl
90	DeVonta Smith	Wide receiver	Philadelphia Eagles		▲10		81 receptions; 1,066 yards receiving; 7 TD receptions
91	Tariq Woolen	Cornerback	Seattle Seahawks		▼15		42 solo tackles; 2 Interceptions; 11 passes defended; 2 fumble recoveries
92	Aaron Rodgers	Quarterback	New York Jets		▼41		Only played 1 game due to injury
93	Harrison Smith	Safety	Minnesota Vikings		▲4		60 solo tackles; 3.0 sacks; 3 passes defended; 3 forced fumbles
94	Trevor Lawrence	Quarterback	Jacksonville Jaguars		▲2		4,016 yards passing; 21 touchdown passes
95	Julian Love	Safety	Seattle Seahawks		NR		86 solo tackles; 4 Interceptions; 10 passes defended; 2 forced fumbles; 1 fumble recovery; Selected to 1st Pro Bowl
96	Dion Dawkins	Offensive tackle	Buffalo Bills		NR		Selected to 3rd Pro Bowl
97	Terry McLaurin	Wide receiver	Washington Commanders		▼3		79 receptions; 1,002 yards receiving; 4 TD receptions
98	Cameron Heyward	Defensive tackle	Pittsburgh Steelers		▼53		25 solo tackles; 2.0 sacks; 1 pass defended; Walter Payton NFL Man of the Year
99	Lavonte David	Linebacker	Tampa Bay Buccaneers		NR		86 solo tackles; 1.5 sacks; 5 passes defended; 1 forced fumble
100	Zaire Franklin	Linebacker	Indianapolis Colts		NR		107 solo tackles; 1.5 sacks; 6 passes defended; 6 forced fumbles
