= Trent Williams =

American football player (born 1988)

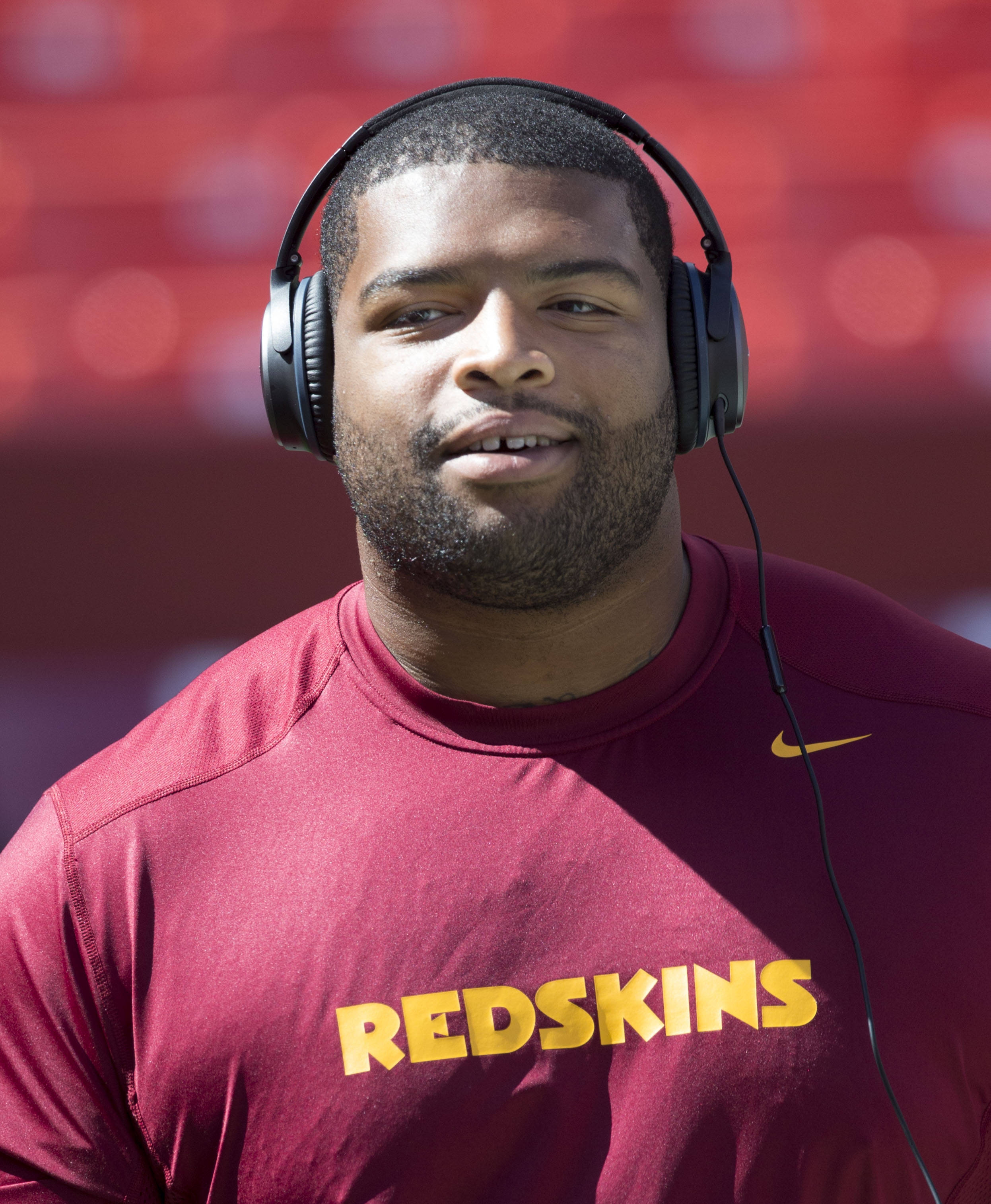
- Williams with the Washington Redskins in 2014

No. 71 – San Francisco 49ers
- Position: Offensive tackle
- Roster status: Active

Personal information
- Born: July 19, 1988 (age 38); Longview, Texas, U.S.
- Listed height: 6 ft 5 in (1.96 m)
- Listed weight: 320 lb (145 kg)

Career information
- High school: Longview
- College: Oklahoma (2006–2009)
- NFL draft: 2010: 1st round, 4th overall pick

Career history
- Washington Redskins (2010–2019); San Francisco 49ers (2020–present)

Awards and highlights
- 3× First-team All-Pro (2021–2023); 2× Second-team All-Pro (2015, 2025); 12× Pro Bowl (2012–2018, 2020−2023, 2025); Washington Commanders 90 Greatest; Consensus All-American (2009); 2× First-team All-Big 12 (2008, 2009)

Career NFL statistics as of Week 10, 2026
- Games played: 213
- Games started: 212
- Fumble recoveries: 2
- Stats at Pro Football Reference

Trent Williams (born July 19, 1988) is an American professional football offensive tackle for the San Francisco 49ers of the National Football League (NFL). Williams is considered one of the greatest offensive tackles of all time, having made twelve Pro Bowls and five All-Pro teams. He played college football for the Oklahoma Sooners and was selected by the Washington Redskins fourth overall in the 2010 NFL draft.

In 2019, Williams held out the entire year with the Redskins due to contractual and personal grievances regarding a cancerous growth on his head downplayed by the team but later determined by private doctors to be life-threatening. The standoff eventually led to him being traded to the 49ers in 2020.

== Early life ==
Williams was born on July 19, 1988, and raised in Longview, Texas. He attended Longview High School, where he played for the Longview Lobos high school football team and was teammates with Malcolm Kelly, Chris Ivory, and Robert Henson. Williams was a unanimous first-team all-district selection as a senior. Longview entered the 2005 UIL playoffs on a 10–0 season record, but lost 14–13 to Nick Florence's South Garland. He was also on the field team as a shot putter. Considered a three-star recruit by Rivals.com, Williams was listed as the No. 28 offensive guard prospect in the nation. He chose Oklahoma over offers from Louisiana State, Oklahoma State, and Texas A&M.

== College career ==
Williams attended the University of Oklahoma, and played for coach Bob Stoops's Oklahoma Sooners football team from 2006 to 2009. Playing as a true freshman, Williams became the starter at right tackle just before the Missouri game in late October 2006 after Branndon Braxton went down with a broken leg, then started the last six games of the season. Williams played 462 snaps, had 75 knockdowns, and was named to The Sporting News Freshman All-American second-team.

In his sophomore year, Williams saw action in all 14 games and had six starts at right tackle, sharing time with Branndon Braxton. As a junior in 2008, he started all 14 games, the first at left tackle and the remaining 13 at right tackle, and registered 131 knockdowns. He was part of a dominant 2008 Sooners offensive line that included Duke Robinson, Phil Loadholt, and allowed only 11 sacks all season, the third-lowest total of any team in the country. The two teams that finished above them (Air Force and Navy) combined to attempt 231 passes. Oklahoma attempted 476, and—featuring quarterback Sam Bradford and running back DeMarco Murray—became the highest-scoring team in the modern era (702 points).

As the lone holdover from the 2008 offensive line, Williams was listed at No. 2 on Rivals.com's 2009 preseason offensive tackle power ranking. He was also named to the 2009 Outland Trophy watch list. Despite missing the regular season finale due to injury, Williams led Oklahoma with 102 knockdown blocks and 885 plays, and was named an All-American by the American Football Coaches Association.

== Professional career ==
Pre-draft measurables
Height	Weight	Arm length	Hand span	40-yard dash	10-yard split	20-yard split	20-yard shuttle	Three-cone drill	Vertical jump	Broad jump	Bench press
6 ft 4 5/8 in (1.95 m)	315 lb (143 kg)	34 1/4 in (0.87 m)	9 3/4 in (0.25 m)	4.88 s	1.72 s	2.87 s	4.51 s	7.45 s	34.5 in (0.88 m)	9 ft 5 in (2.87 m)	23 reps
All values from NFL Combine/Pro Day

=== Washington Redskins ===
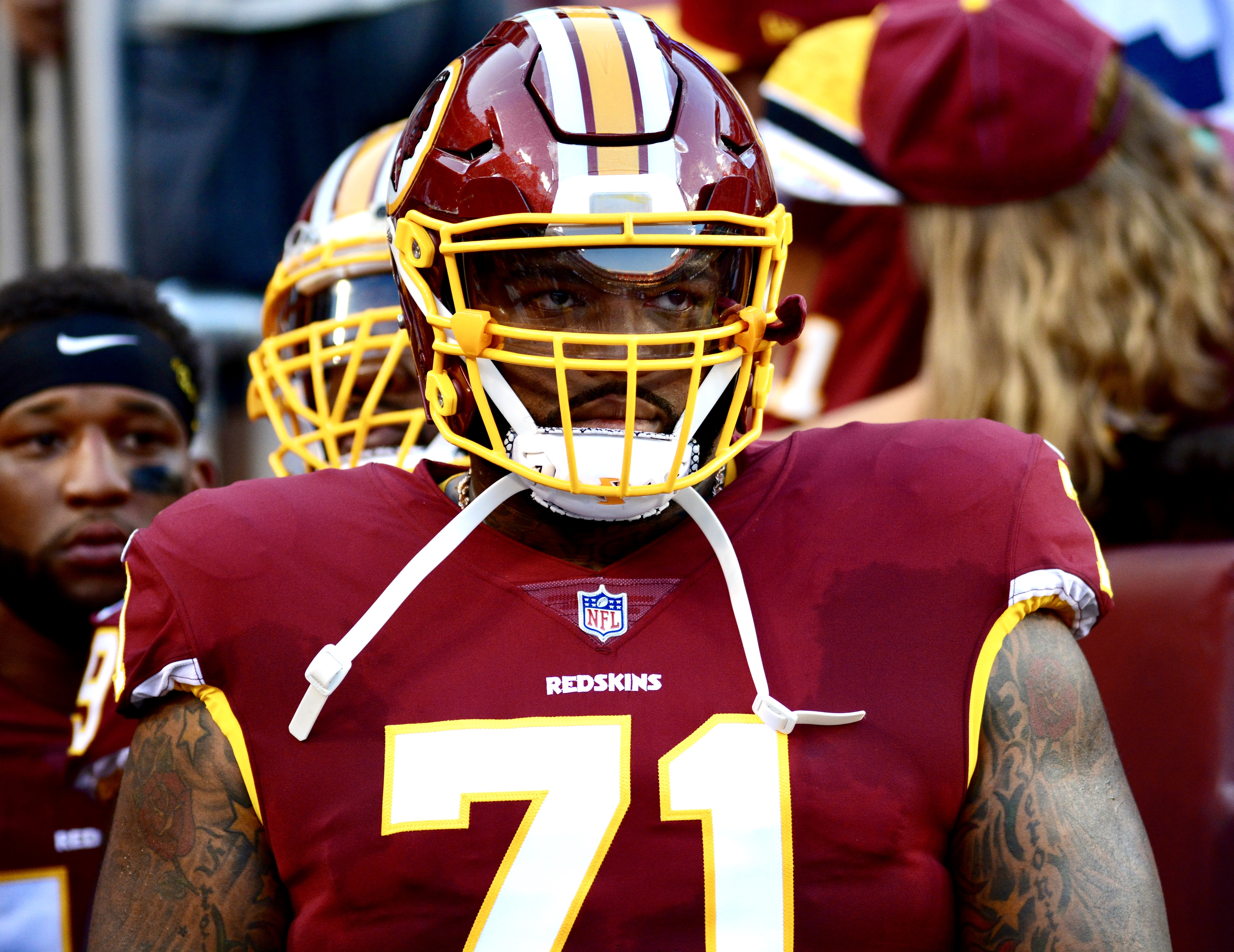
Williams with the Washington Redskins in 2018

Williams was considered one of the best offensive tackles available in the 2010 NFL draft, where he was selected fourth overall by the Washington Redskins. He agreed to a six-year, US$60 million contract on July 30, 2010. In 2011, Williams was made an offensive co-captain along with veteran teammate Santana Moss. In Week 14, Williams and teammate Fred Davis were suspended for four games after failing several drug tests.

Williams suffered a bone bruise in his left foot during the first 2012 preseason game against the Buffalo Bills. Despite this injury, he started in the next two preseason games and was fully healed by the season opener against the New Orleans Saints. By the start of the season, his teammates voted for him again to be the offensive team captain. He suffered a right knee injury early in the Redskins' Week 3 game against the Cincinnati Bengals. After getting an MRI exam the next day, it was reported that Williams had another bone bruise.

He was able to play in the next game against the Tampa Bay Buccaneers. Despite playing injured throughout the season, Williams had his best performance in 2012 and was selected for the 2013 Pro Bowl but couldn't participate in the Pro Bowl due to an injury when a night club fight occurred. After the Redskins' Wild Card playoff loss against the Seattle Seahawks on January 6, 2013, Williams struck Seahawks cornerback Richard Sherman in the face. He was fined $7,875 for the incident.

After the Week 11 game of the 2013 season, Williams accused umpire Roy Ellison of swearing at him during the game with his accusation supported by several of his teammates. Ellison was in turn suspended by the NFL for one game. Despite the Redskins having a bad year as a team, Williams was chosen as the team's only player on the 2014 Pro Bowl team.

During the 2015 offseason, Williams lost nearly 30 pounds, going from a playing weight of roughly 345 to 318. On August 29, 2015, he agreed to a five-year, $66 million contract extension with $43.25 million guaranteed. On November 1, 2016, Williams was suspended four games for violating the NFL's substance abuse policy. Despite missing the games, Williams was named to his fifth straight Pro Bowl, was second-team All-Pro for the first time. Williams started 10 games in 2017 while dealing with a knee injury for most of the season, and was placed on injured reserve on December 22, 2017. Despite the injury, Williams was named to his sixth straight Pro Bowl.

In April 2019, it was reported that Williams had a surgical procedure done to remove a growth from his head that was diagnosed as dermatofibrosarcoma protuberans (DFSP), a type of cancer. The growth was first noticed in 2013, with him claiming that the Redskins medical staff told him it was not serious at the time. He did not report to the team's mandatory mini-camp, and reportedly demanded to be released or traded over how the team's medical staff handled the situation back then. On July 27, 2019, the Redskins placed Williams on the team's reserve list.

After the Redskins failed to trade him before the trade deadline, he was reinstated on October 30, 2019. However, Williams failed to pass a physical exam, as he experienced discomfort with his helmet due to his scalp having postsurgical soreness, which resulted in the Redskins placing him on the non-football injury list. In March 2020, he and his agent were granted permission to seek a trade to another team.

On September 1, 2022, Williams was inducted into Washington's Greatest Players list in honor of the franchise's 90th anniversary.

=== San Francisco 49ers ===
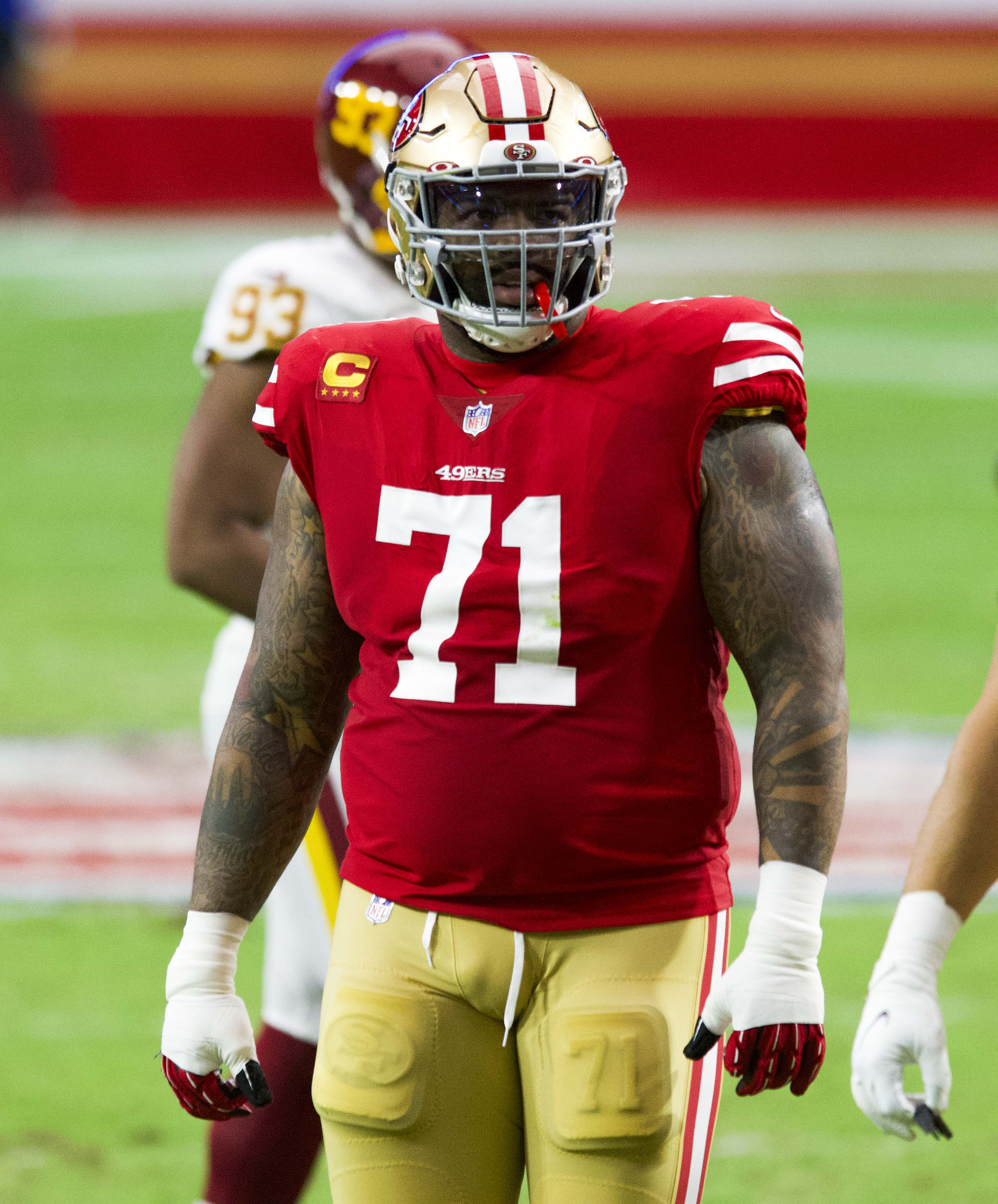
Williams with the San Francisco 49ers in 2020

On April 25, 2020, Williams was traded to the San Francisco 49ers in exchange for a fifth-round pick in the 2020 NFL draft and a third-round pick in the 2021 NFL draft. The trade reunited Williams with San Francisco 49ers' head coach Kyle Shanahan, who previously held the offensive coordinator position with the Washington Redskins. Williams was placed on the reserve/COVID-19 list by the team on November 4, 2020, and activated two days later. He was placed back on the COVID-19 list on November 20, and activated again on November 28.

On January 1, 2021, Williams was placed on injured reserve after suffering an elbow injury against the Arizona Cardinals in the previous week. Williams was elected to his eighth Pro Bowl after posting a 91.9 PFF grade, which ranked first at his position in 2020. He was ranked 42nd by his fellow players on the NFL Top 100 Players of 2021.

On March 23, 2021, Williams signed a six-year, $138.06 million contract extension with the 49ers, making him the highest-paid offensive lineman in the NFL. His contract includes $55.10 million guaranteed and a signing bonus of $30.10 million. He appeared in and started 15 regular season games and three postseason games for the 49ers. He earned Pro Bowl and first team All-Pro honors for the 2021 season. He was ranked 14th by his fellow players on the NFL Top 100 Players of 2022.

In the 2022 season, Williams appeared in and started 14 regular season games and three postseason games. For the tenth time, Williams made the Pro Bowl. For the second consecutive year, he was named as a first team All-Pro selection. On January 29, 2023, Williams was ejected during the NFC Championship for violently slamming Philadelphia Eagles safety K'Von Wallace to the ground after a scuffle between both teams. Wallace was ejected as well. He was ranked 14th by his fellow players on the NFL Top 100 Players of 2023.

In the 2023 season, Williams appeared in and started 15 regular season games. For the eleventh time, Williams made the Pro Bowl. For the third consecutive year, he was named as a first team All-Pro selection. He reached his first Super Bowl, which the 49ers lost 25–22 in overtime to the Kansas City Chiefs. He was ranked seventh by his fellow players on the NFL Top 100 Players of 2024.

Williams was ranked seventh by his peers on the NFL Top 100 Players of 2024, being the highest-ranked offensive lineman. On September 3, 2024, Williams finalized a new deal for three years and $82.66 million with the 49ers. The new deal includes $48 million fully guaranteed at signing and a $25.69 million signing bonus.

In the 2024 season, Williams played in 10 games before he was sidelined due to an ankle injury in Weeks 12-16. On December 23, after the 49ers were eliminated from the playoffs with their Week 16 loss to the Miami Dolphins, Shanahan announced that Williams would not return for the final two games of the season. He was ranked 45th by his fellow players on the NFL Top 100 Players of 2025.

In the 2025 season, Williams started in 16 games. He was named to the Pro Bowl Games.

== Personal life ==
Williams is friends with running back Adrian Peterson and they co-own a gym in Houston. The two were teammates at Oklahoma in 2006 and with the Redskins in the late 2010s. Williams and his former wife, Sondra, have three daughters. In November 2024, Sondra announced that she had a son who was stillborn; this came after the son's twin was miscarried.

Williams' nickname is "Silverback", named after the male gorilla. Williams has a large gorilla tattoo on his back and owns gorilla art and a bejeweled gorilla keychain. At the 2010 NFL Draft, he was introduced by league commissioner Roger Goodell with the moniker, after Williams dared Goodell to do it. He was the subject of a documentary called Silverback, which debuted in December 2021 and covered his comeback from a life-threatening sarcoma on his scalp.
