= NFL Top 100 Players of 2025 =

Annual list of top NFL players

- Season 2025
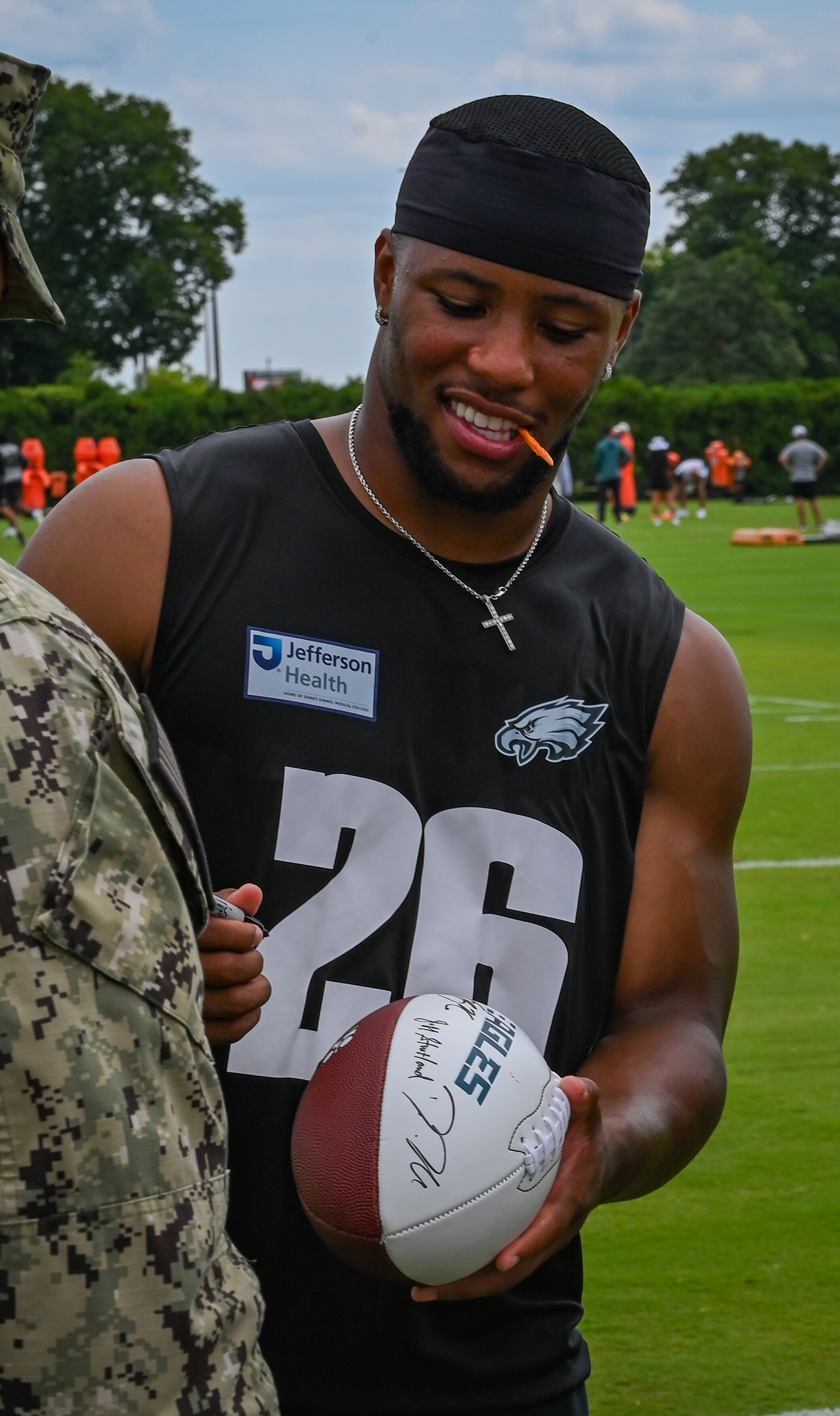
- Saquon Barkley, the #1-ranked player

Release
- Original network: NFL+ (100–11); NFL Network (10–1)
- Original release: June 30 – September 1, 2025

Season chronology
- ← Previous; 2024 Next → 2026

The NFL Top 100 Players of 2025, honoring the best NFL players of the year, is the fifthteenth season in the NFL Top 100. It premiered on June 30, 2025, and concluded on September 1, 2025. Philadelphia Eagles running back Saquon Barkley was ranked the top player of 2025, the first time in his career. Five teams failed to have a player on the list: the Carolina Panthers, Chicago Bears, Indianapolis Colts.

== Episodes ==
No.	Air date	Network	Numbers
1	June 30 – July 4	NFL+	100–91
2	July 7 – 11	NFL+	90–81
3	July 14 – 18	NFL+	80–71
4	July 21 – 25	NFL+	70–61
5	July 28 – August 1	NFL+	60–51
6	August 4 – 8	NFL+	50–41
7	August 11 – 15	NFL+	40–31
8	August 18 – 22	NFL+	30–21
9	August 25 – 29	NFL+	20–11
10	September 1	NFLN	10–1

== Top 100 Players ==
Rank	Player	Position	2024 team	2025 team	Rank change	Reference	Year's accomplishments
1	Saquon Barkley	Running back	Philadelphia Eagles		▲85		Super Bowl champion; NFL Offensive Player of the Year; 2,005 rushing yards (league leader); 13 rushing touchdowns; 1st-Team All-Pro; Selected to 3rd Pro Bowl
2	Lamar Jackson	Quarterback	Baltimore Ravens		0		4,172 passing yards; 41 passing touchdowns; 915 rushing yards; 6.6 rushing yards per attempt (league leader); 1st-Team All-Pro; Selected to 4th Pro Bowl
3	Josh Allen	Quarterback	Buffalo Bills		▲9		NFL Most Valuable Player; 3,731 passing yards; 28 passing touchdowns; 531 rushing yards; 12 rushing touchdowns; 2nd-Team All-Pro; Selected to 3rd Pro Bowl
4	Ja'Marr Chase	Wide receiver	Cincinnati Bengals		▲41		127 receptions (league leader); 1,708 receiving yards (league leader); 17 receiving touchdowns (league leader); 1st-Team All-Pro; Selected to 4th Pro Bowl
5	Patrick Mahomes	Quarterback	Kansas City Chiefs		▼1		3,928 passing yards; 26 passing touchdowns; 307 rushing yards; 2 rushing touchdowns
6	Joe Burrow	Quarterback	Cincinnati Bengals		▲33		NFL Comeback Player of the Year; 4,918 passing yards (league leader); 43 passing touchdowns (league leader); 41 rushing yards; Selected to 2nd Pro Bowl
7	Derrick Henry	Running back	Baltimore Ravens		▲42		1,921 yards rushing; 16 rushing TDs (league leader); 2nd-Team All-Pro; Selected to 5th Pro Bowl
8	Myles Garrett	Defensive end	Cleveland Browns		▼3		40 solo tackles; 14 sacks; 1 pass defended; 3 forced fumbles; 1 fumble recovery; 1st-Team All-Pro; Selected to 6th Pro Bowl
9	Justin Jefferson	Wide receiver	Minnesota Vikings		▲9		103 receptions; 1,533 receiving yards; 10 receiving touchdowns; 1st-Team All-Pro; Selected to 4th Pro Bowl
10	Patrick Surtain II	Cornerback	Denver Broncos		▲42		NFL Defensive Player of the Year; 34 solo tackles; 11 passes defended; 4 interceptions; 1 forced fumble; 1st-Team All-Pro; Selected to 3rd Pro Bowl
11	T. J. Watt	Linebacker	Pittsburgh Steelers		▼3		40 solo tackles; 11.5 sacks; 4 passes defended; 6 forced fumbles (league leader); 2nd-Team All-Pro; Selected to 7th Pro Bowl
12	Chris Jones	Defensive tackle	Kansas City Chiefs		▼6		19 solo tackles; 5 sacks; 1 forced fumble; 1st-Team All-Pro; Selected to 6th Pro Bowl
13	Penei Sewell	Offensive tackle	Detroit Lions		▲9		1st-Team All-Pro; Selected to 3rd Pro Bowl
14	Trey Hendrickson	Defensive end	Cincinnati Bengals		▲63		33 solo tackles; 17.5 sacks (league leader); 6 passes defended; 2 forced fumbles; 1st-Team All-Pro; Selected to 4th Pro Bowl
15	Jared Goff	Quarterback	Detroit Lions		▲33		4,629 passing yards; 37 passing touchdowns; Selected to 4th Pro Bowl
16	Fred Warner	Linebacker	San Francisco 49ers		▼5		76 solo tackles; 1.0 sack; 7 passes defended; 4 forced fumbles; 2 interceptions; 1st-Team All-Pro; Selected to 4th Pro Bowl
17	Dexter Lawrence	Defensive tackle	New York Giants		▲7		23 solo tackles; 9.0 sacks; 1 pass defended; 1 forced fumble; Selected to 3rd Pro Bowl
18	Derek Stingley Jr.	Cornerback	Houston Texans		NR		37 solo tackles; 18 passes defended; 5 interceptions; 1st-Team All-Pro; Selected to 1st Pro Bowl
19	Jalen Hurts	Quarterback	Philadelphia Eagles		▼4		Super Bowl champion; Super Bowl MVP; 2,903 passing yards; 18 passing touchdowns
20	Amon-Ra St. Brown	Wide receiver	Detroit Lions		▲3		115 receptions; 1,263 receiving yards; 12 receiving touchdowns; 1st-Team All-Pro; Selected to 3rd Pro Bowl
21	Jayden Daniels	Quarterback	Washington Commanders		NR		NFL Offensive Rookie of the Year; 3,568 passing yards; 25 passing touchdowns; Selected to 1st Pro Bowl
22	Maxx Crosby	Defensive end	Las Vegas Raiders		▼12		28 solo tackles; 7.5 sacks; 5 passes defended; Selected to 4th Pro Bowl
23	Lane Johnson	Offensive tackle	Philadelphia Eagles		▲18		Super Bowl champion; 2nd-Team All-Pro; Selected to 6th Pro Bowl
24	Brock Bowers	Tight end	Las Vegas Raiders		NR		112 receptions (rookie record); 1,194 receiving yards; 5 receiving touchdowns; 1st-Team All-Pro; Selected to 1st Pro Bowl
25	Danielle Hunter	Defensive end	Houston Texans		▲43		31 solo tackles; 12.0 sacks; 3 passes defended; 1 forced fumble; Selected to 5th Pro Bowl
26	Zack Baun	Linebacker	Philadelphia Eagles		NR		Super Bowl champion; 93 solo tackles; 3.5 sacks; 4 passes defended; 5 forced fumbles; 1 fumble recovery; 1 interception; 1st-Team All-Pro; Selected to 1st Pro Bowl
27	Jahmyr Gibbs	Running back	Detroit Lions		NR		1,412 rushing yards; 16 rushing touchdowns; Selected to 2nd Pro Bowl
28	Tristan Wirfs	Offensive tackle	Tampa Bay Buccaneers		▲57		1st-Team All-Pro; Selected to 4th Pro Bowl
29	A. J. Brown	Wide receiver	Philadelphia Eagles		▼8		Super Bowl champion; 67 receptions; 1,079 receiving yards; 7 receiving touchdowns; 2nd-Team All-Pro
30	Xavier McKinney	Safety	Green Bay Packers		NR		60 solo tackles; 1.0 sack; 11 passes defended; 1 fumble recovery; 8 interceptions; 1st-Team All-Pro; Selected to 1st Pro Bowl
31	George Kittle	Tight end	San Francisco 49ers		▼17		78 receptions; 1,106 receiving yards; 8 receiving touchdowns; 2nd-Team All-Pro; Selected to 6th Pro Bowl
32	Nico Collins	Wide receiver	Houston Texans		NR		68 receptions; 1,006 receiving yards; 7 receiving touchdowns; Selected to 1st Pro Bowl
33	Josh Jacobs	Running back	Green Bay Packers		NR		1,329 rushing yards; 15 rushing touchdowns; Selected to 3rd Pro Bowl
34	Budda Baker	Safety	Arizona Cardinals		▲55		95 solo tackles; 2.0 sacks; 5 passes defended; 1 forced fumble; 2nd-Team All-Pro; Selected to 7th Pro Bowl
35	CeeDee Lamb	Wide receiver	Dallas Cowboys		▼22		101 receptions; 1,194 receiving yards; 6 receiving touchdowns; 2nd-Team All-Pro; Selected to 4th Pro Bowl
36	Micah Parsons	Defensive end	Dallas Cowboys	Green Bay Packers	▼19		30 solo tackles; 12.0 sacks; 1 pass defended; 2 forced fumbles; Selected to 4th Pro Bowl
37	Travis Kelce	Tight end	Kansas City Chiefs		▼28		97 receptions; 823 receiving yards; 3 receiving touchdowns; Selected to 10th Pro Bowl
38	Nik Bonitto	Linebacker	Denver Broncos		NR		33 solo tackles; 13.5 sacks; 4 passes defended; 2 forced fumbles; 1 fumble recovery; 1 interception; 2nd-Team All-Pro; Selected to 1st Pro Bowl
39	C. J. Stroud	Quarterback	Houston Texans		▼19		3,727 passing yards; 20 passing touchdowns
40	Roquan Smith	Linebacker	Baltimore Ravens		▼21		81 solo tackles; 1.5 sacks; 4 passes defended; 1 forced fumble; 1 fumble recovery; 1 interception; 1st-Team All-Pro; Selected to 3rd Pro Bowl
41	Puka Nacua	Wide receiver	Los Angeles Rams		▼8		79 receptions; 990 receiving yards; 3 receiving touchdowns
42	Dion Dawkins	Offensive tackle	Buffalo Bills		▲54		Selected to 4th Pro Bowl
43	Jalen Carter	Defensive tackle	Philadelphia Eagles		NR		Super Bowl champion; 25 solo tackles; 4.5 sacks; 6 passes defended; 2 forced fumbles; 2nd-Team All-Pro; Selected to 1st Pro Bowl
44	Mike Evans	Wide receiver	Tampa Bay Buccaneers		▼18		74 receptions; 1,004 receiving yards; 11 receiving touchdowns; Selected to 6th Pro Bowl
45	Trent Williams	Offensive tackle	San Francisco 49ers		▼38		
46	Will Anderson Jr.	Defensive end	Houston Texans		NR		27 solo tackles; 11.0 sacks; 2 passes defended; 1 forced fumble; 1 fumble recovery
47	Tyreek Hill	Wide receiver	Miami Dolphins		▼46		81 receptions; 959 receiving yards; 6 receiving touchdowns
48	Jonathan Greenard	Linebacker	Minnesota Vikings		NR		41 solo tackles; 12.0 sacks; 3 passes defensed; 4 forced fumbles; Selected to 1st Pro Bowl
49	Quinyon Mitchell	Cornerback	Philadelphia Eagles		NR		Super Bowl champion; 37 solo tackles; 12 passes defensed
50	Baker Mayfield	Quarterback	Tampa Bay Buccaneers		NR		4,500 passing yards; 41 passing touchdowns; Selected to 2nd Pro Bowl
51	Kyle Hamilton	Safety	Baltimore Ravens		▼8		77 solo tackles; 2 sacks; 9 passes defended; 2 forced fumbles; 1 fumble recovery; 1 interception; 2nd-Team All-Pro; Selected to 2nd Pro Bowl
52	Terry McLaurin	Wide receiver	Washington Commanders		▲45		82 receptions; 1,096 receiving yards; 13 receiving touchdowns; 2nd-Team All-Pro; Selected to 2nd Pro Bowl
53	Jared Verse	Linebacker	Los Angeles Rams		NR		NFL Defensive Rookie of the Year; 36 solo tackles; 4.5 sacks; 2 forced fumbles; Selected to 1st Pro Bowl
54	Derwin James	Safety	Los Angeles Chargers		▲29		60 solo tackles; 5.5 sacks; 7 passes defended; 1 fumble recovery; 1 interception; 2nd-Team All-Pro; Selected to 4th Pro Bowl
55	Aidan Hutchinson	Defensive end	Detroit Lions		▼8		12 solo tackles; 7.5 sacks; 1 forced fumble
56	Justin Herbert	Quarterback	Los Angeles Chargers		▲19		3,870 passing yards; 23 passing touchdowns
57	Nick Bosa	Defensive end	San Francisco 49ers		▼30		33 solo tackles; 9.0 sacks; 1 pass defended; 1 forced fumble; 1 fumble recovery; 1 interception; Selected to 5th Pro Bowl
58	Joe Mixon	Running back	Houston Texans		NR		1,016 rushing yards; 11 rushing touchdowns; Selected to 2nd Pro Bowl
59	Matthew Stafford	Quarterback	Los Angeles Rams		▼17		3,762 passing yards; 20 passing touchdowns
60	Cooper DeJean	Cornerback	Philadelphia Eagles		NR		Super Bowl champion; 38 solo tackles; 0.5 sack; 6 passes defended; 1 forced fumble; 3 fumble recoveries
61	Brian Thomas Jr.	Wide receiver	Jacksonville Jaguars		NR		87 receptions; 1,282 receiving yards; 10 receiving touchdowns; Selected to 1st Pro Bowl
62	Bijan Robinson	Running back	Atlanta Falcons		NR		1,456 rushing yards; 14 rushing touchdowns; Selected to 1st Pro Bowl
63	Josh Hines-Allen	Defensive end	Jacksonville Jaguars		▼28		26 solo tackles; 8.0 sacks; 2 passes defended; 1 forced fumble; 1 fumble recovery
64	Bo Nix	Quarterback	Denver Broncos		NR		3,775 passing yards; 29 passing touchdowns
65	Trey McBride	Tight end	Arizona Cardinals		NR		111 receptions; 1,146 receiving yards; 2 receiving touchdowns; Selected to 1st Pro Bowl
66	Jalen Ramsey	Cornerback	Miami Dolphins	Pittsburgh Steelers	▼41		39 solo tackles; 1.0 sack; 11 passes defended; 2 interceptions
67	Malik Nabers	Wide receiver	New York Giants		NR		104 receptions; 1,204 receiving yards; 7 receiving touchdowns; Selected to 1st Pro Bowl
68	Jordan Love	Quarterback	Green Bay Packers		▼34		3,389 passing yards; 25 passing touchdowns
69	Jordan Mailata	Offensive tackle	Philadelphia Eagles		NR		Super Bowl champion; 2nd-Team All-Pro
70	Frankie Luvu	Linebacker	Washington Commanders		NR		54 solo tackles; 8.0 sacks; 7 passes defended; 1 forced fumble; 2 fumble recoveries; 1 interception; 2nd-Team All-Pro
71	Kerby Joseph	Safety	Detroit Lions		NR		58 solo tackles; 12 passes defended; 9 interceptions (league leader); 1st-Team All-Pro
72	Sam Darnold	Quarterback	Minnesota Vikings	Seattle Seahawks	NR		4,319 passing yards; 35 passing touchdowns; Selected to 1st Pro Bowl
73	Christian McCaffrey	Running back	San Francisco 49ers		▼70		202 rushing yards
74	Bobby Wagner	Linebacker	Washington Commanders		▼15		75 solo tackles; 2.0 sacks; 4 passes defended; 1 forced fumble; 2 fumble recoveries; 2nd-Team All-Pro; Selected to 10th Pro Bowl
75	Patrick Queen	Linebacker	Pittsburgh Steelers		▼11		65 solo tackles; 1.0 sack; 7 passes defended; 2 forced fumbles; Selected to 2nd Pro Bowl
76	Vita Vea	Defensive tackle	Tampa Bay Buccaneers		NR		27 solo tackles; 7.0 sacks; 1 pass defended; Selected to 2nd Pro Bowl
77	Tee Higgins	Wide receiver	Cincinnati Bengals		NR		73 receptions; 911 receiving yards; 10 receiving touchdowns
78	Khalil Mack	Linebacker	Los Angeles Chargers		▼49		20 solo tackles; 6.0 sacks; 9 passes defended; 2 forced fumbles; 1 fumble recovery; Selected to 9th Pro Bowl
79	Dak Prescott	Quarterback	Dallas Cowboys		▼63		1,978 passing yards; 11 passing touchdowns
80	Rashan Gary	Defensive end	Green Bay Packers		▼30		26 solo tackles; 7.5 sacks; 1 pass defended; 1 forced fumble; 1 fumble recovery; Selected to 1st Pro Bowl
81	Trent McDuffie	Cornerback	Kansas City Chiefs		NR		45 solo tackles; 0.5 sack; 13 passes defended; 1 forced fumble; 2 interceptions; 2nd-Team All-Pro
82	Jerry Jeudy	Wide receiver	Cleveland Browns		NR		90 receptions; 1,229 receiving yards; 4 receiving touchdowns; Selected to 1st Pro Bowl
83	Cameron Heyward	Defensive tackle	Pittsburgh Steelers		▲15		35 solo tackles; 11 passes defended; 8.0 sacks; 2nd-Team All-Pro; Selected to 7th Pro Bowl
84	Christian Gonzalez	Cornerback	New England Patriots		NR		50 solo tackles; 11 passes defended; 1 fumble recovery; 2 interceptions; 2nd-Team All-Pro
85	Kyren Williams	Running back	Los Angeles Rams		▼7		1,299 rushing yards; 14 rushing touchdowns
86	Laremy Tunsil	Offensive tackle	Houston Texans	Washington Commanders	▼15		Selected to 5th Pro Bowl
87	Quinnen Williams	Defensive tackle	New York Jets		▼50		25 solo tackles; 6.0 sacks; Selected to 3rd Pro Bowl
88	Andrew Van Ginkel	Linebacker	Minnesota Vikings		NR		50 solo tackles; 11.5 sacks; 6 passes defended; 1 fumble recovery; 2 interceptions; 2nd-Team All-Pro; Selected to 1st Pro Bowl
89	James Cook	Running back	Buffalo Bills		NR		1,009 rushing yards; 16 rushing touchdowns; Selected to 2nd Pro Bowl
90	Zach Allen	Defensive end	Denver Broncos		NR		32 solo tackles; 8.5 sacks; 1 pass defended; 2nd-team All-Pro
91	Tua Tagovailoa	Quarterback	Miami Dolphins		▼55		2,867 passing yards; 19 passing touchdowns
92	Jessie Bates	Safety	Atlanta Falcons		▼18		62 solo tackles; 1.0 sack; 10 passes defended; 4 forced fumbles; 1 fumble recovery; 4 interceptions
93	Creed Humphrey	Center	Kansas City Chiefs		NR		1st-Team All-Pro; Selected to 3rd Pro Bowl
94	Sam LaPorta	Tight end	Detroit Lions		▼14		60 receptions; 726 receiving yards; 7 receiving touchdowns
95	Josh Sweat	Defensive end	Philadelphia Eagles	Arizona Cardinals	NR		Super Bowl champion; 27 solo tackles; 8.0 sacks; 2 passes defended
96	Lavonte David	Linebacker	Tampa Bay Buccaneers		▲3		76 solo tackles; 5.5 sacks; 6 passes defended; 1 fumble recovery; 1 interception
97	Drake London	Wide receiver	Atlanta Falcons		NR		100 receptions; 1,271 receiving yards; 9 receiving touchdowns
98	Aaron Jones	Running back	Minnesota Vikings		NR		1,138 rushing yards; 5 rushing touchdowns
99	Leonard Williams	Defensive end	Seattle Seahawks		NR		37 solo tackles; 11.0 sacks; 3 passes defended; 1 interception; Selected to 2nd Pro Bowl
100	Ladd McConkey	Wide receiver	Los Angeles Chargers		NR		82 receptions; 1,149 receiving yards; 7 receiving touchdowns
