= Dion Dawkins =

American football player (born 1994)

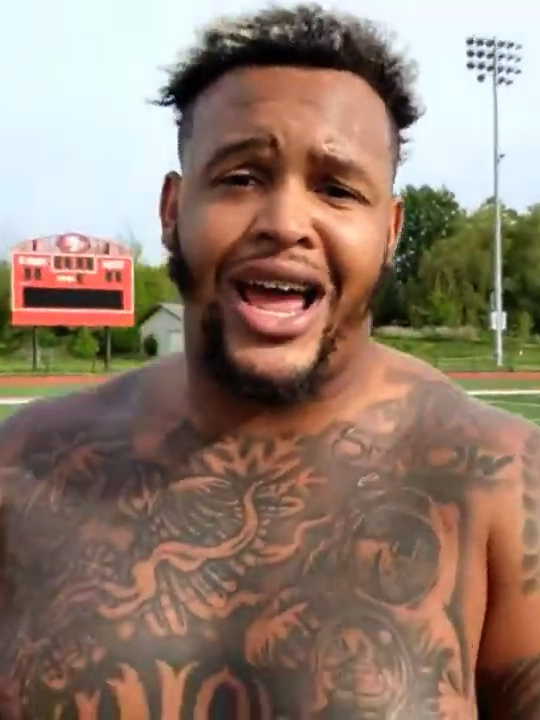
- Dawkins in 2022

No. 73 – Buffalo Bills
- Position: Offensive tackle
- Roster status: Active

Personal information
- Born: April 26, 1994 (age 32); Rahway, New Jersey, U.S.
- Listed height: 6 ft 5 in (1.96 m)
- Listed weight: 320 lb (145 kg)

Career information
- High school: Rahway
- College: Temple (2013–2016)
- NFL draft: 2017: 2nd round, 63rd overall pick

Career history
- Buffalo Bills (2017–present)

Awards and highlights
- 5× Pro Bowl (2021–2025); First-team All-AAC (2016)

Career NFL statistics as of Week 10, 2026
- Games played: 151
- Games started: 145
- Receptions: 2
- Receiving yards: 8
- Receiving touchdowns: 2
- Stats at Pro Football Reference

Dion Dawkins (born April 26, 1994) is an American professional football offensive tackle for the Buffalo Bills of the National Football League (NFL). He played college football for the Temple Owls.

== Early life and education ==
Dawkins attended Rahway High School in Rahway, New Jersey where he earned the nickname "the Shnowman." After originally committing to the Cincinnati Bearcats, Dawkins signed with Temple in January 2013.

== College career ==
Dawkins played at Temple from 2013 to 2016, starting 41 of 44 career games. Dawkins was named a First-team All-American Athletic Conference selection after his senior year.

== Professional career ==
Dawkins received an invitation to the Senior Bowl and started at guard for the North team. The North lost 16–15 to the South and he was named the Senior Bowl's top offensive lineman. He improved his draft stock after practicing and performing well during the Senior Bowl. He attended the NFL Combine and completed all of the combine drills and positional drills. At Temple's Pro Day, Dawkins opted to attempt the vertical jump again and added two inches to his number from the Combine. He performed well in the positional drills with 40 scouts and representatives from all 32 NFL teams scouting him and 13 other teammates, including Temple's feature prospect, Haason Reddick.

Dawkins had private workouts with four teams, including the San Francisco 49ers, Carolina Panthers, Denver Broncos, and Indianapolis Colts. He was projected to be a second round pick, and was ranked the second-best guard in the draft by Sports Illustrated, the third-best guard by ESPN, the third-best interior offensive lineman by NFL analyst Mike Mayock, and the fourth-best offensive tackle by NFL analyst Bucky Brooks and NFLDraftScout.com.

Pre-draft measurables
| Height | Weight | Arm length | Hand span | Wingspan | 40-yard dash | 10-yard split | 20-yard split | 20-yard shuttle | Three-cone drill | Vertical jump | Broad jump | Bench press |
|---|---|---|---|---|---|---|---|---|---|---|---|---|
| 6 ft 3 7/8 in (1.93 m) | 314 lb (142 kg) | 35 in (0.89 m) | 9 7/8 in (0.25 m) | 6 ft 11 7/8 in (2.13 m) | 5.11 s | 1.80 s | 2.94 s | 4.78 s | 7.30 s | 28.0 in (0.71 m) | 8 ft 10 in (2.69 m) | 26 reps |
All values from NFL Combine/Pro Day

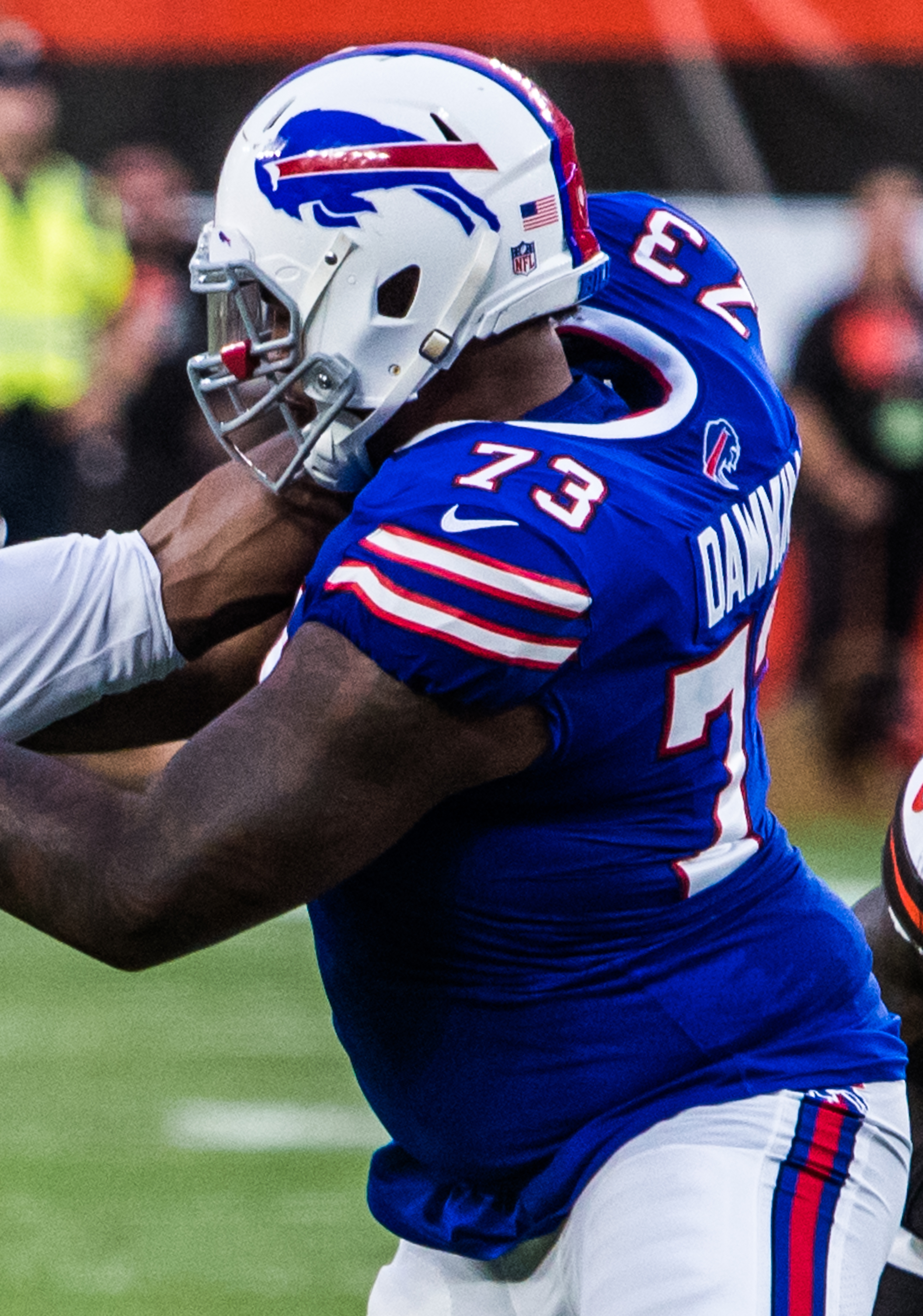
Dawkins with the Bills in 2018

The Buffalo Bills selected Dawkins in the second round (63rd overall) of the 2017 NFL draft. Dawkins was the second offensive guard drafted in 2017, behind Western Kentucky guard Forrest Lamp.

On May 19, 2017, the Bills signed Dawkins to a four-year, $4.18 million contract with $1.83 million guaranteed and a signing bonus of $1.18 million. He played in all 16 games, starting 11 at left tackle in place of Cordy Glenn. Dawkins received an overall grade of 74.5 from Pro Football Focus in 2017.

Dawkins entered training camp in 2018 slated as the starting left tackle after the Bills traded Cordy Glenn to the Cincinnati Bengals. Head coach Sean McDermott named Dawkins the starting left tackle to begin the regular season in 2018. In Week 10 of the 2018 season, against the New York Jets, Dawkins caught his first career pass, a seven-yard touchdown from quarterback Matt Barkley. He started all 16 games in the 2018 season.

In Week 16 of the 2019 season, against the New England Patriots, Dawkins caught his second touchdown pass from Josh Allen. He started all 16 games in the 2019 season.

On August 13, 2020, Dawkins signed a four-year, $60 million contract extension with the Bills that includes $34 million guaranteed. He started all 16 regular season games and all three postseason games for the Bills in the 2020 season.

In 2021, he began training camp on the COVID-19 reserve list and needed some time to return to playing shape. Dawkins later revealed that he spent four days in the hospital battling the disease calling it "one of the lowest points" of his life. He appeared in 16 games and started 15 in the 2021 season. He was named to his first Pro Bowl for his accomplishments in the 2021 season.

In the 2022 season, Dawkins appeared in and started 15 regular season games and two postseason games for the Bills. He earned Pro Bowl honors for a second straight season.

In the 2023 season, Dawkins appeared in and started all 17 regular season games and two postseason games for the Bills. He earned Pro Bowl honors for the third consecutive season. He was ranked 96th by his fellow players on the NFL Top 100 Players of 2024.

On March 11, 2024, Dawkins signed a three-year, $60.5 million contract extension with the Bills through the 2027 season. In the 2024 season, he started in 16 regular season games and all three of the Bills' postseason games. He earned Pro Bowl honors for the fourth consecutive season. He was ranked 42nd by his fellow players on the NFL Top 100 Players of 2025.

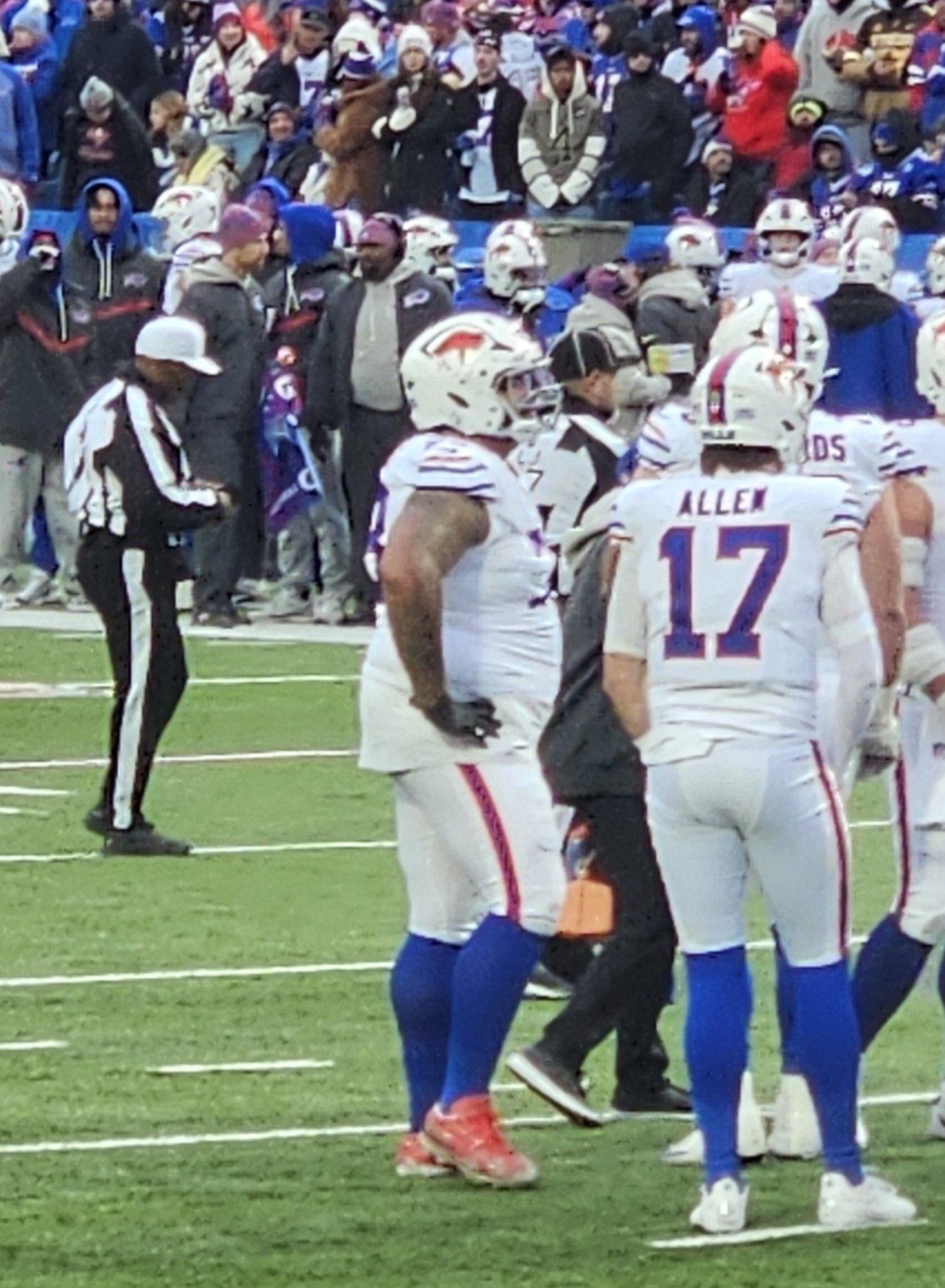
Dawkins and Josh Allen in 2025

Dawkins started in 15 regular season and both of the Bills' postseason games in the 2025 season. He was named a Pro Bowler for the fifth consecutive season.

=== Regular season statistics ===
Legend
| **Bold** | Career high |

| Year | Team | Games | | Offense | | | | | |
| Year | Team | GP | GS | Snaps | Pct | Holding | False start | Decl/Pen | Acpt/Pen |
|---|---|---|---|---|---|---|---|---|---|
| 2017 | BUF | 16 | 11 | 781 | 74% | 2 | 0 | 1 | 3 |
| 2018 | BUF | 16 | 16 | 1,057 | **100%** | 1 | 4 | **4** | 11 |
| 2019 | BUF | 16 | 16 | 1,016 | 95% | 3 | 3 | 3 | 7 |
| 2020 | BUF | 16 | 16 | 1,032 | 95% | 1 | 2 | 1 | 3 |
| 2021 | BUF | 16 | 15 | 1,089 | 97% | **5** | 1 | 1 | 7 |
| 2022 | BUF | 15 | 15 | 957 | 95% | 4 | 3 | 2 | 8 |
| 2023 | BUF | 17 | 17 | **1,120** | 96% | 4 | 1 | 1 | 6 |
| 2024 | BUF | 16 | 16 | 961 | 94% | 2 | **9** | 0 | **14** |
| 2025 | BUF | 15 | 15 | 957 | 97% | 3 | 7 | 0 | 10 |
| 2026 | BUF | 8 | 8 | 524 | 99% | 1 | 3 | 2 | 5 |
| Career | | 151 | 145 | 9,494 | - | 26 | 33 | 15 | 74 |

== Personal life ==
Dawkins is engaged to Daiyaana Muhammad, with whom he has three children.

Dawkins is an avid fan of professional wrestling and has been seen at numerous WWE events in Buffalo, often sitting behind the commentary tables at ringside.
