= CeeDee Lamb =

American football player (born 1999)

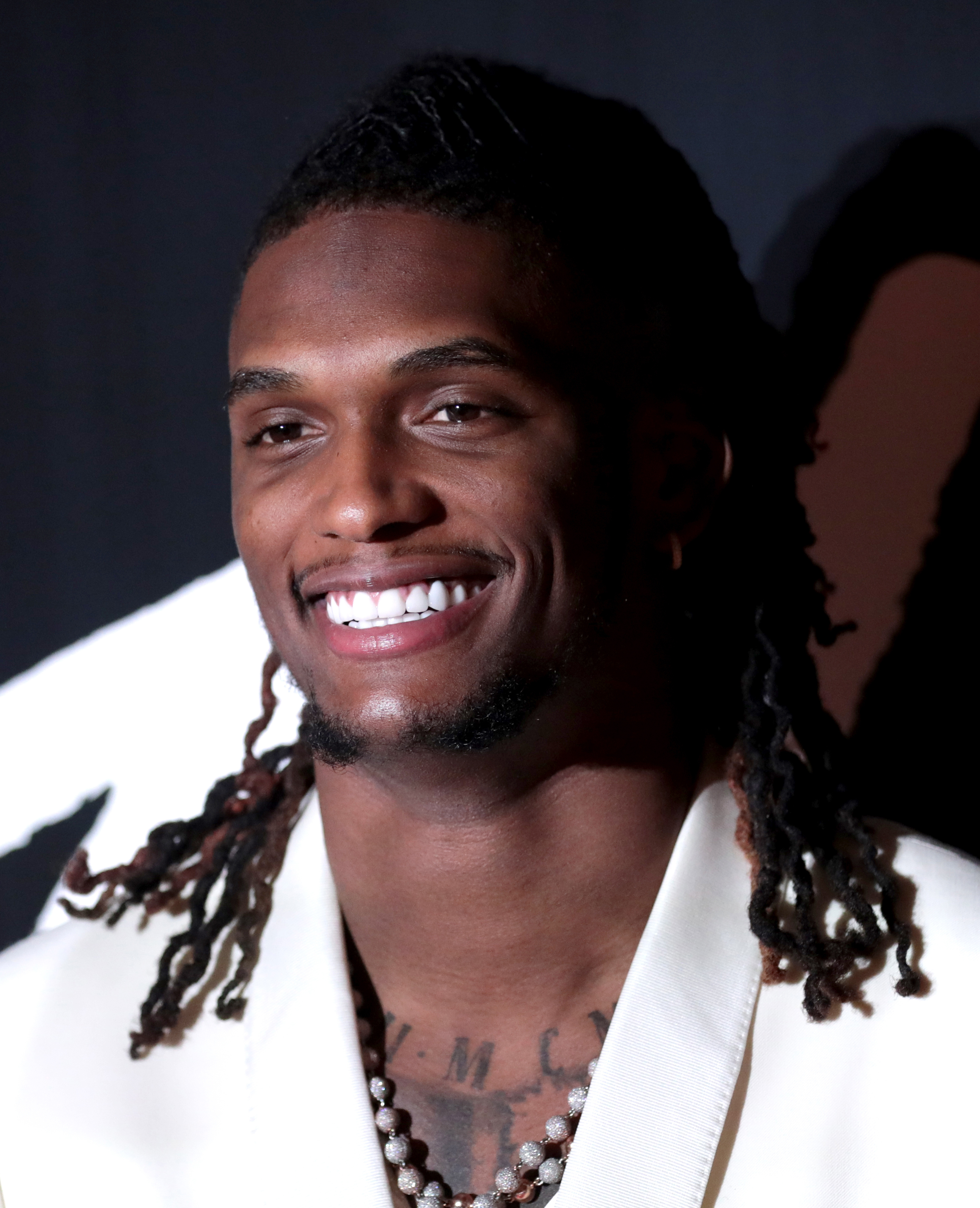
- Lamb in 2023

No. 88 – Dallas Cowboys
- Position: Wide receiver
- Roster status: Active

Personal information
- Born: April 8, 1999 (age 27); Opelousas, Louisiana, U.S.
- Listed height: 6 ft 2 in (1.88 m)
- Listed weight: 198 lb (90 kg)

Career information
- High school: Foster (Fort Bend County, Texas)
- College: Oklahoma (2017–2019)
- NFL draft: 2020: 1st round, 17th overall pick

Career history
- Dallas Cowboys (2020–present)

Awards and highlights
- First-team All-Pro (2023); 2× Second-team All-Pro (2022, 2024); 5× Pro Bowl (2021–2025); NFL receptions leader (2023); Consensus All-American (2019); First-team All-Big 12 (2019); Second-team All-Big 12 (2018)

Career NFL statistics as of Week 10, 2026
- Receptions: 648
- Receiving yards: 8,392
- Receiving touchdowns: 50
- Stats at Pro Football Reference

Cedarian DeLeon "CeeDee" Lamb (born April 8, 1999) is an American professional football wide receiver for the Dallas Cowboys of the National Football League (NFL). He played college football for the Oklahoma Sooners where he was a consensus All-American in 2019, and was selected by the Cowboys in the first round of the 2020 NFL draft.

Lamb has been named to the Pro Bowl in five of his first six seasons and the All-Pro team three times. He led the league in receptions in 2023.

== Early life ==
Lamb was born in Opelousas, Louisiana, and lived in New Orleans until he and his family evacuated to Houston, Texas, following Hurricane Katrina's effects on the city in 2005. He began playing football in the 4th grade, and when a coach asked him his name and couldn't pronounce it during drills, he began calling him by the nickname "CeeDee" and it stuck. Lamb attended John and Randolph Foster High School in Richmond, Texas, where he played high school football. As a junior, he caught 57 receptions for 1,082 yards and 11 touchdowns.

As a senior, Lamb had 98 receptions for 2,032 yards (fourth in state history), 33 receiving touchdowns (tied for second in state history) and three punt returns for touchdowns. Lamb, with quarterback Alex Ramart, led the team to a 14–1 overall record, with the only loss coming to Temple High School in the 5A-D1 state semifinals. Lamb received All-State, Houston Touchdown Club's Offensive Player of the Year and the Houston Chronicle's All-Greater Houston Football Offensive Player of the Year honors.

Lamb was rated a four-star recruit by 247Sports.com, Rivals.com and ESPN, and had offers from the University of Alabama and University of Texas. He committed to the University of Oklahoma on July 25, 2016.

== College career ==
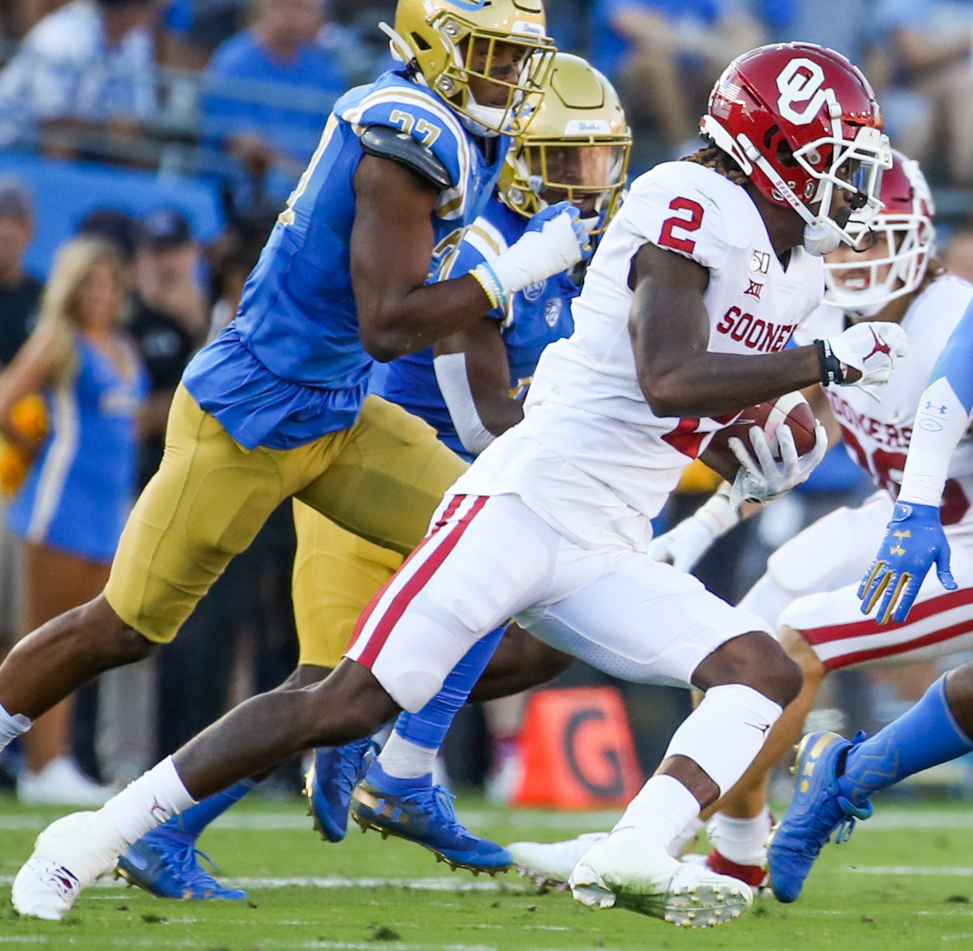
Lamb (#2) in 2019

As a true freshman at Oklahoma in 2017, Lamb caught passes from quarterback Baker Mayfield, who would go on to win the Heisman Trophy. Lamb played in all 14 games, posting 46 receptions (tied for second for freshman) for 807 yards (school freshman record) and seven touchdowns (tied the school freshman record). He set school freshman single-game records with nine receptions for 147 yards and tied the school freshman single-game mark with two touchdown receptions against Texas Tech. He received freshman All-American honors by ESPN.

As a sophomore in 2018, Lamb's starting quarterback was Kyler Murray, who would also go on to win the Heisman Trophy. Lamb was a key contributor in the Sooners 12–2 record and playoff appearance. He played in all 14 games with 13 starts, catching 65 passes for 1,158 yards and 11 touchdowns (led the team). Lamb was also the team's punt returner, registering 17 returns for 218 yards and a 12.8-yard average (second in the Big 12). Lamb recorded five 100-yard receiving games and he and Marquise Brown became the first wide receiver tandem in school history to record 1,000-yard receiving seasons in the same year. He established a career-high with 167 receiving yards on six receptions and scored one touchdown in the Big 12 Championship 39–27 win against #9 Texas. Lamb had a career-high eight receptions for 109 yards and one touchdown against the top ranked Alabama Crimson Tide in the College Football Playoff semifinal at the 2018 Orange Bowl.

As a junior in 2019, Lamb caught passes from quarterback Jalen Hurts, who finished second in the Heisman Trophy voting. He was named a first-team All-American, after catching 62 passes for 1,327 yards and 14 touchdowns. Lamb's 21.4 yards average per reception, was the most ever in a single season by an OU player with at least 50 receptions. He was a finalist for the Biletnikoff Award for outstanding college football receiver. Lamb was named the Most Outstanding Player of the Big 12 Championship, after collecting 173 yards on eight receptions (including a 71-yarder that set up the team's first touchdown) in a 30–23 victory over #7 Baylor. He had four receptions for 119 yards (including a 51-yarder) in the College Football Playoff Semifinal at the 2019 Peach Bowl in a 63–28 loss to #1 Louisiana State University. On December 29, Lamb announced that he would forgo his senior year and enter the 2020 NFL draft.

== Professional career ==
Pre-draft measurables
Height	Weight	Arm length	Hand span	Wingspan	40-yard dash	10-yard split	20-yard split	Vertical jump	Broad jump	Bench press	Wonderlic
6 ft 1 5/8 in (1.87 m)	198 lb (90 kg)	32 1/4 in (0.82 m)	9 1/4 in (0.23 m)	6 ft 4 5/8 in (1.95 m)	4.50 s	1.46 s	2.62 s	34.5 in (0.88 m)	10 ft 4 in (3.15 m)	11 reps	12
All values from NFL Combine

=== 2020 season ===
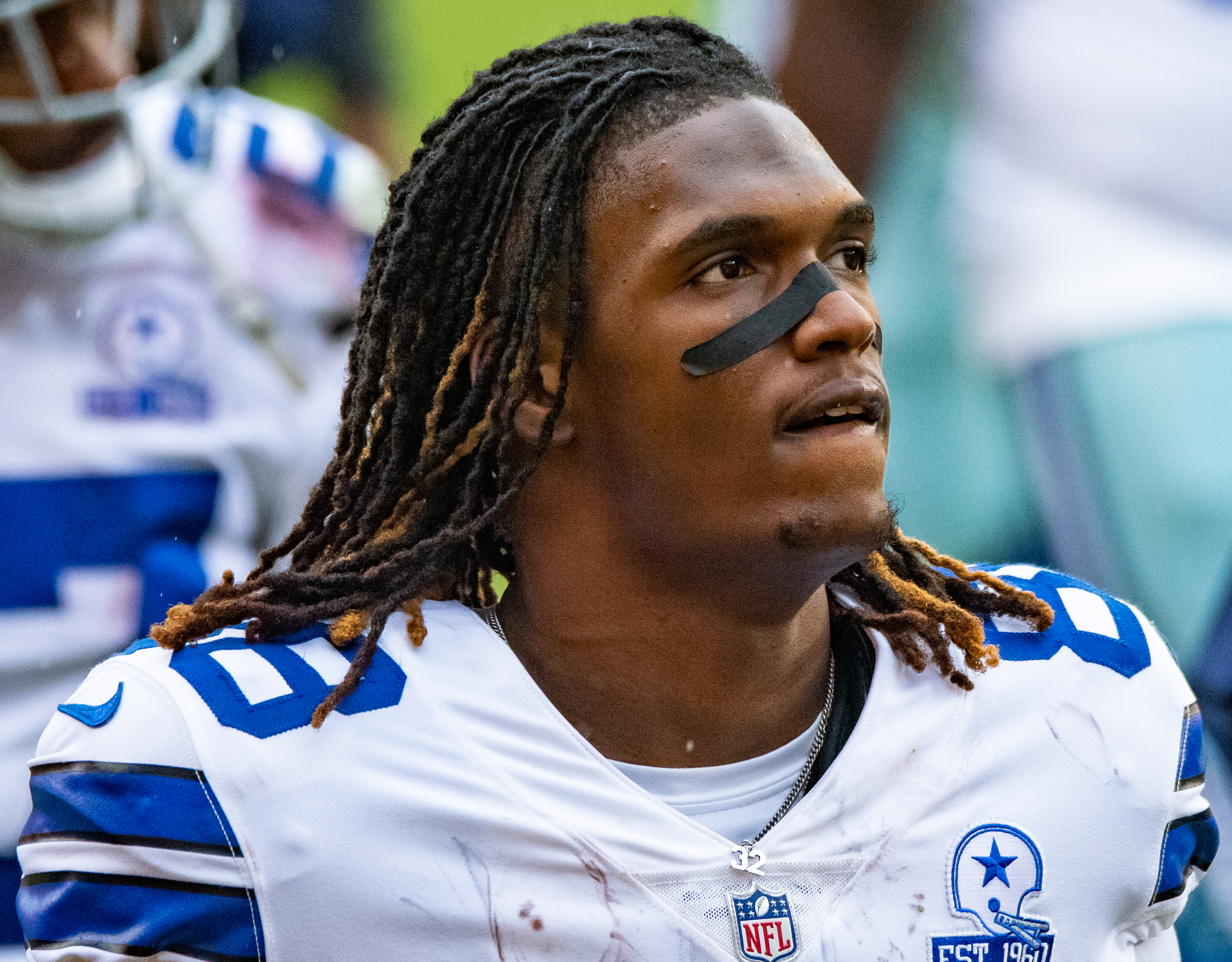
Lamb with the Cowboys in 2020

Lamb was selected by the Dallas Cowboys in the first round with the 17th overall pick in the 2020 NFL draft. He was the third wide receiver selected, behind Henry Ruggs (Las Vegas Raiders, 12th overall) and Jerry Jeudy (Denver Broncos, 15th overall). On July 23, 2020, Lamb signed a 4-year, $14.01 million contract with the team, with a $7.7 million signing bonus and a fifth-year team option.

Lamb made his NFL debut in the season-opener against the Los Angeles Rams on NBC Sunday Night Football, recording five receptions for 59 yards in the 20–17 road loss. In the next game against the Atlanta Falcons, Lamb caught six passes for 106 yards, including a 24-yard reception to help set up the Cowboys' game winning field goal during the narrow 40–39 comeback victory. Two weeks later against the Cleveland Browns, Lamb had five receptions for 79 yards and two touchdowns in the 49–38 loss. Playing against the New York Giants in Week 5, he was the number one target at 11 total targets, making eight receptions for 124 yards, in the eventual 37–34 victory. During a Week 9 24–19 loss to the Pittsburgh Steelers, Lamb caught four passes for 71 yards and his third touchdown of the season while also losing his first fumble of his career. During a Week 15 41–33 victory over the San Francisco 49ers, Lamb recorded five catches for 85 yards and returned an onside kick attempt for a 47-yard touchdown. In the next game against the Philadelphia Eagles, Lamb recorded three catches for 65 yards, including a 52-yard touchdown reception, and rushed once for a 19-yard touchdown during the 37–17 victory.

Lamb finished his rookie season with 74 receptions for 935 yards and five touchdowns to go along with 10 carries for 82 yards and a touchdown in 16 games and 14 starts. He finished second to Justin Jefferson among rookies in receiving yards.

=== 2021 season ===
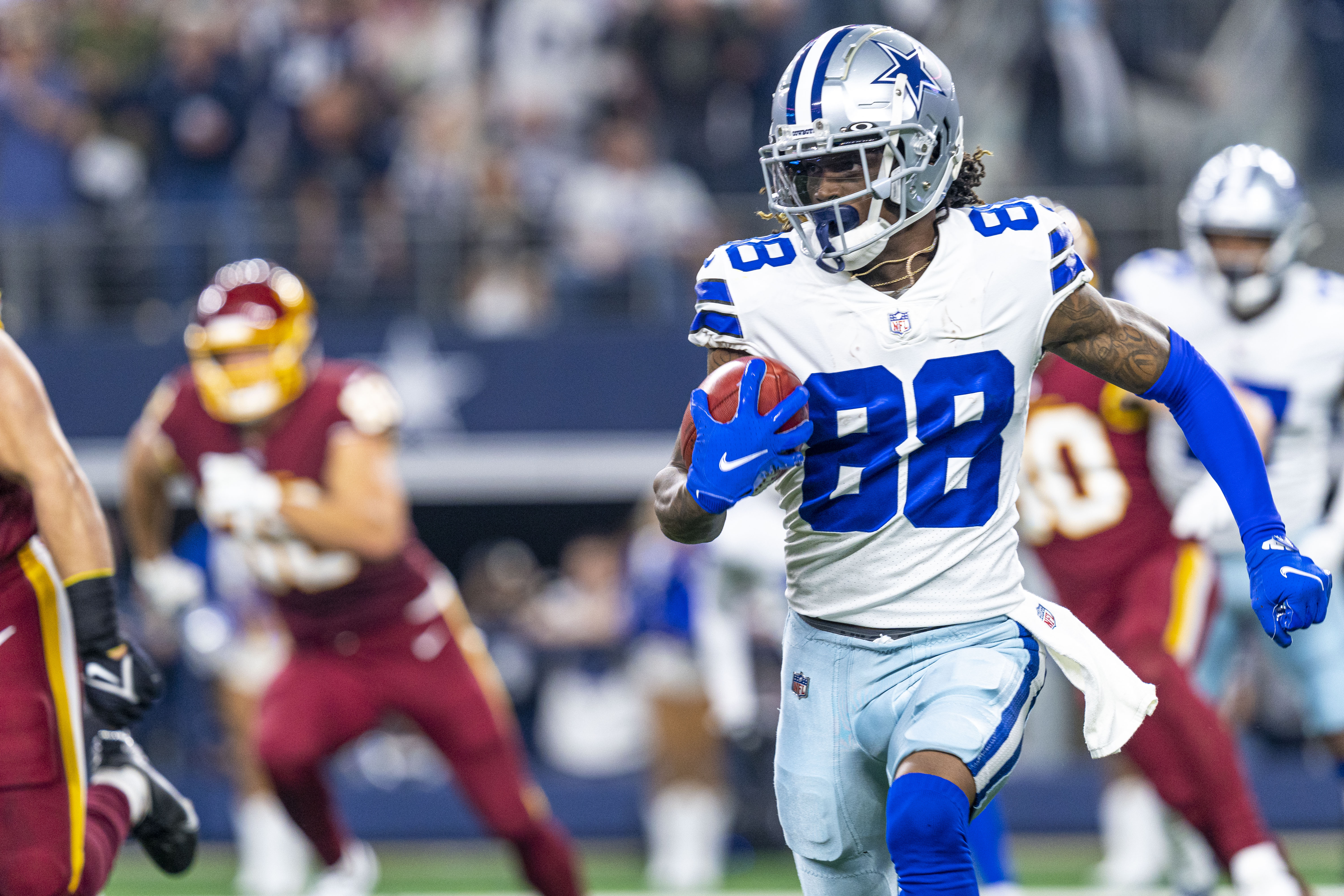
Lamb in action during the 2021 season

During the season-opening 31–29 road loss to the Tampa Bay Buccaneers, Lamb had seven receptions for 104 yards and a touchdown. During a Week 5 44–20 victory over the New York Giants, he caught four passes for 84 yards and a touchdown to go along with a four-yard rush. In the next game against the New England Patriots, Lamb caught the game-winning 35-yard touchdown in overtime, finishing with nine receptions for 149 yards and two touchdowns in the 35–29 overtime road victory. During a Week 10 43–3 victory over the Atlanta Falcons, he had six receptions for 94 yards and two touchdowns to go along with a 12-yard carry. During a Week 16 56–14 victory over the Washington Football Team, Lamb caught four passes for 66 yards, giving him his first career 1,000-yard season.

Lamb finished his second professional season with a team-leading 79 receptions for 1,102 yards and six touchdowns (tied for second on the team) in 16 games and 13 starts. He was selected to his first Pro Bowl after the season as a replacement for Cooper Kupp, who participated in Super Bowl LVI. Lamb was ranked 95th by his fellow players on the NFL Top 100 Players of 2022.

=== 2022 season ===
During a Week 10 31–28 overtime road loss to the Green Bay Packers, Lamb recorded 11 receptions for 150 yards and two touchdowns. During a Week 15 40–34 overtime road loss to the Jacksonville Jaguars, he had seven receptions for 126 yards. In the next game against the Philadelphia Eagles, he had ten receptions for 120 yards and two touchdowns in the 40–34 victory.

Lamb finished the 2022 season with 107 receptions for 1,359 yards and nine touchdowns, all career-highs, in 17 games and starts. He was named as a Pro Bowler for the second time. Lamb was also named to the AP All-Pro 2nd Team. In the Wild Card Round against the Tampa Bay Buccaneers, he recorded four receptions for 68 yards and his first postseason touchdown in the 31–14 road victory. In the Divisional Round against the 49ers, Lamb caught 10 passes for 117 yards in the 19–12 loss. He was ranked 34th by his fellow players on the NFL Top 100 Players of 2023.

=== 2023 season ===
In Week 2, against the Jets, Lamb had 11 receptions for 143 yards in the 30–10 win. After the Cowboys' Week 10 49–17 win against the New York Giants, Lamb became the first player in NFL history to have at least 10 catches for over 150 yards in three consecutive games. He earned NFC Offensive Player of the Week for Week 10. During the Cowboys' Week 17 20–19 win over the Detroit Lions, Lamb recorded 13 catches and 227 receiving yards, breaking Michael Irvin's Cowboys franchise record for receptions and receiving yards in a single season.

He finished the 2023 season with 135 receptions for 1,749 yards and 12 touchdowns. He finished as the league leader in receptions. He was named first team All-Pro for the first time and earned Pro Bowl honors for the third time. He was ranked 13th by his fellow players on the NFL Top 100 Players of 2024.

=== 2024 season ===
Entering the fifth-year option of his rookie deal, Lamb skipped voluntary workouts, mandatory minicamp and training camp, holding out for a new contract. On August 26, 2024, Lamb signed a four-year, $136 million deal with $100 million guaranteed and a $38 million signing bonus to stay with the Cowboys through the 2028 season. In Week 8, against the 49ers, he had 13 receptions for 146 yards and two touchdowns in the 30–24 loss. He started 15 games in 2024, recording 101 catches, 1,194 yards, and six touchdowns. He was named as a Pro Bowler for the fourth time, and also named to the AP All-Pro 2nd Team. However the Cowboys finished the season 7–10 and missed the playoffs. He was ranked 35th by his fellow players on the NFL Top 100 Players of 2025.

=== 2025 season ===
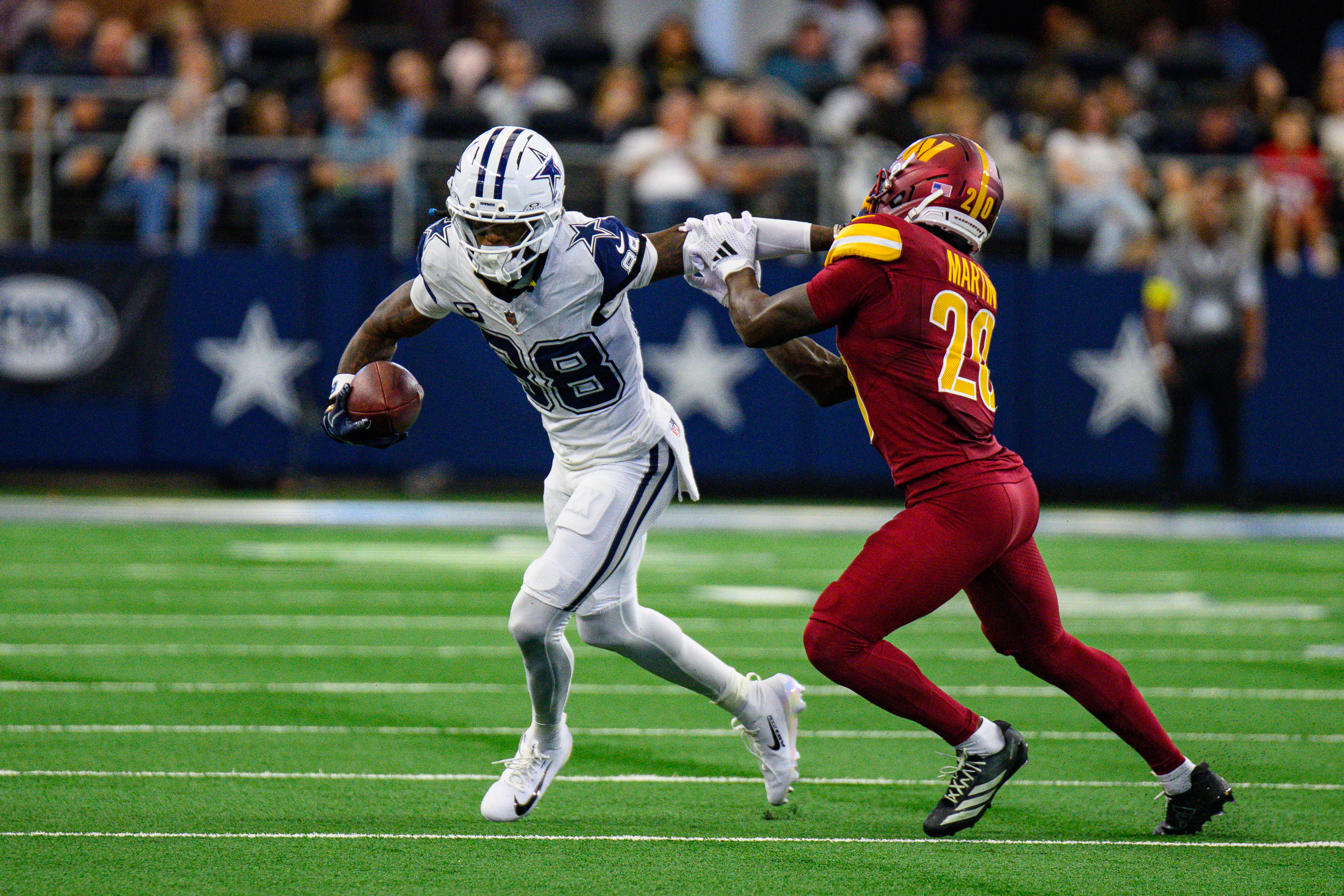
Lamb stiff-arming Quan Martin during a game against the Washington Commanders in 2025

In Week 1 against the Philadelphia Eagles, Lamb recorded seven receptions and 110 yards, but also dropped four passes in a 24–20 loss, including a potential wide-open game-winning pass with two minutes left in the fourth quarter. Lamb took accountability after the game, saying "That’s terrible, I can’t point no fingers at nobody else. As a player, you pray for moments like this … God has a mysterious way of humbling you at times … but I just need to catch the damn ball." In Week 2 against the New York Giants, Lamb caught nine passes for 112 yards in a 40–37 overtime victory. In Week 3 against the Chicago Bears, Lamb left the game in the first quarter after suffering an ankle injury. It was later revealed that Lamb suffered a high ankle sprain, which sidelined him for three games.

Lamb returned in Week 7 against the Washington Commanders, catching five passes for 110 yards and one touchdown in a 44–22 victory. In Week 13 against the Kansas City Chiefs on Thanksgiving Day, Lamb caught seven passes for 112 yards and a touchdown in a 31–28 victory. In Week 14 against the Detroit Lions, Lamb caught six passes for 121 yards, but exited the game early in the third quarter after suffering a concussion in a 44–30 loss.

In Week 15 against the Minnesota Vikings on Sunday Night Football, Lamb caught six passes for 111 yards in a 34–26 loss. In Week 16 against the Los Angeles Chargers, Lamb caught six passes for 51 yards in a 34–17 loss. In doing so, he recorded his fifth consecutive 1,000-yard season, joining Michael Irvin as the only two players in Cowboys history with at least five consecutive 1,000-yard seasons.

In 14 games, Lamb totaled 75 receptions for 1,077 yards and a career-low three touchdowns. On January 28, 2026, Lamb was named to his fifth consecutive Pro Bowl as the Super Bowl replacement for Jaxon Smith-Njigba.

=== 2026 season ===
In Week 1 against the New York Giants, Lamb caught five passes for 44 yards and scored the Cowboys' first touchdown of the season in a 28-20 loss. In Week 2 against the Washington Commanders, Lamb hauled in eight receptions for 153 yards and two touchdowns in a 37-20 victory. In Week 3 against the Baltimore Ravens, Lamb caught seven passes for 112 yards in a 34-31 loss.

In Week 4 against the Houston Texans, Lamb caught 17 passes for 189 yards, including a game-winning 12-yard touchdown reception in a 34–30 victory. In Week 7 against the Philadelphia Eagles on Monday Night Football, Lamb made five receptions for 74 yards and two touchdowns in a 38-21 victory. In Week 9 against the Indianapolis Colts, Lamb caught 10 passes for 195 yards and a touchdown in a 27-23 victory.

== Career statistics ==
Legend
	Led the league
**Bold**	Career high

=== NFL ===
==== Regular season ====
Year	Team	Games		Receiving						Rushing					Returning					Fumbles	
Year	Team	GP	GS	Tgt	Rec	Yds	Avg	Lng	TD	Att	Yds	Avg	Lng	TD	Ret	Yds	Avg	Lng	TD	Fum	Lost
2020	DAL	16	14	111	74	935	12.6	52	5	10	82	8.2	19	1	**25**	**219**	8.8	**47T**	**1**	1	1
2021	DAL	16	13	120	79	1,102	13.9	49	6	9	76	**8.4**	**33**	0	14	139	**9.9**	21	0	0	0
2022	DAL	17	17	156	107	1,359	12.7	39	9	10	47	4.7	14	0	0	0	0.0	0	0	0	0
2023	DAL	17	17	**181**	**144**	**1,749**	13.0	**92**	**12**	**14**	**113**	8.1	24	**2**	0	0	0.0	0	0	**3**	**2**
2024	DAL	15	15	152	101	1,194	11.8	65	6	**14**	70	5.0	18	0	0	0.0	0	0	0	1	1
2025	DAL	14	13	117	75	1,077	**14.4**	74	3	1	2	2.0	2	0	0	0	0.0	0	0	0	0
2026	DAL	10	10	121	77	976	12.7	49	8	2	-6	-3.0	0	0	0	0	0.0	0	0	1	0
Career		105	99	958	648	8,392	13.0	92	49	60	384	6.4	33	3	39	358	9.2	47T	1	6	4

==== Postseason ====
Year	Team	Games		Receiving						Rushing					Returning					Fumbles	
Year	Team	GP	GS	Tgt	Rec	Yds	Avg	Lng	TD	Att	Yds	Avg	Lng	TD	Ret	Yds	Avg	Lng	TD	Fum	Lost
2021	DAL	1	1	5	1	21	**21.0**	21	0	1	5	**5.0**	**5**	0	**1**	**5**	**5.0**	**5**	0	0	0
2022	DAL	2	2	**19**	**14**	**185**	13.2	46	**1**	**2**	**6**	3.0	4	0	—	—	—	—	—	0	0
2023	DAL	1	1	7	9	110	12.2	**47**	0	1	5	**5.0**	**5**	0	—	—	—	—	—	0	0
Career		4	4	41	24	316	13.2	47	1	4	16	4.0	5	0	1	5	5.0	5	0	0	0

=== College ===
Season	Team	GP	Receiving				Rushing			
Season	Team	GP	Rec	Yds	Avg	TD	Att	Yds	Avg	TD
2017	Oklahoma	14	46	807	17.5	7	14	78	5.6	0
2018	Oklahoma	14	**65**	1,158	17.8	11	**17**	**218**	**12.8**	0
2019	Oklahoma	13	62	**1,327**	**21.4**	**14**	9	20	2.2	**1**
Total		41	173	3,292	19.0	32	40	316	7.9	1

== Career highlights ==
=== Awards and honors ===
NFL

- First-team All-Pro (2023)
- 2× Second-team All-Pro (2022, 2024)
- 5× Pro Bowl (2021–2025)
- NFL receptions leader (2023)
- NFL Moment of the Year (2023)
- Yards after catch leader: (2023)
- Ranked No. 95 in the Top 100 Players of 2022
- Ranked No. 34 in the Top 100 Players of 2023
- Ranked No. 13 in the Top 100 Players of 2024
- Ranked No. 35 in the Top 100 Players of 2025
- Ranked No. 55 in the Top 100 Players of 2026

College

- Consensus All-American (2019)
- First-team All-Big 12 (2019)
- Second-team All-Big 12 (2018)

=== Records ===
==== NFL records ====
- Most consecutive games with 10 receptions & 150+ receiving yards in a single season: 3 (2023)
- Most games with 11+ receptions in a single season: 7 (2023)

==== Cowboys franchise records ====
- Most receptions (season): 135 (2023)
- Most receiving yards (season): 1,749 (2023)
