= Quinnen Williams =

American football player (born 1997)

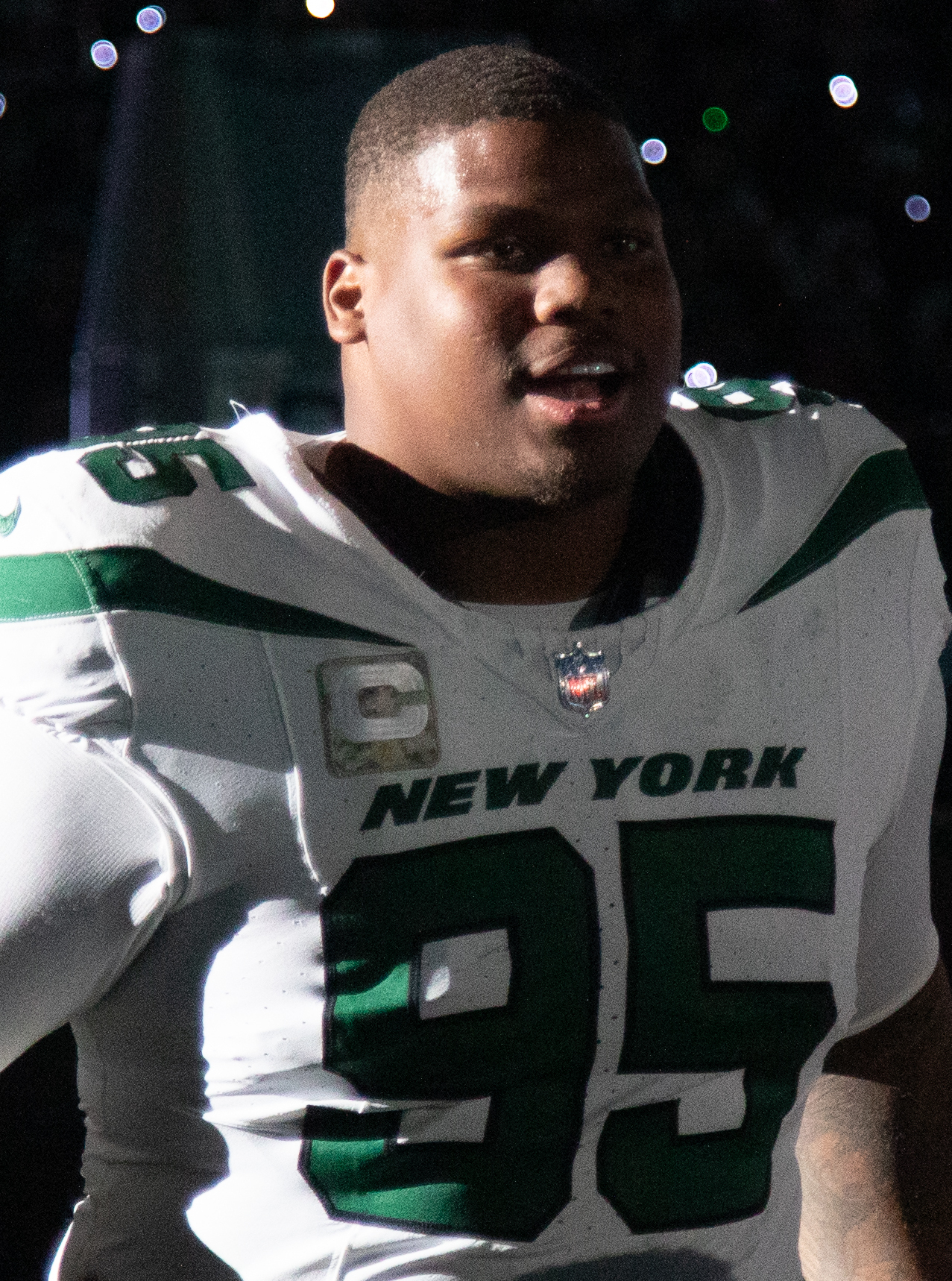
- Williams with the New York Jets in 2023

No. 92 – Dallas Cowboys
- Position: Defensive tackle
- Roster status: Active

Personal information
- Born: December 20, 1997 (age 28); Birmingham, Alabama, U.S.
- Listed height: 6 ft 3 in (1.91 m)
- Listed weight: 303 lb (137 kg)

Career information
- High school: Wenonah (Birmingham)
- College: Alabama (2016–2018)
- NFL draft: 2019: 1st round, 3rd overall pick

Career history
- New York Jets (2019–2025); Dallas Cowboys (2025–present)

Awards and highlights
- First-team All-Pro (2022); 4× Pro Bowl (2022–2025); CFP national champion (2017); Outland Trophy (2018); Bill Willis Trophy (2018); Unanimous All-American (2018); First-Team All-SEC (2018)

Career NFL statistics as of Week 5, 2026
- Total tackles: 358
- Sacks: 42.5
- Forced fumbles: 9
- Fumble recoveries: 3
- Pass deflections: 15
- Interceptions: 2
- Stats at Pro Football Reference

Quinnen Williams (born December 20, 1997) is an American professional football defensive tackle for the Dallas Cowboys of the National Football League (NFL). He played college football for the Alabama Crimson Tide and was selected by the New York Jets with the third overall pick in the 2019 NFL draft. He is the younger brother of linebacker Quincy Williams.

== Early life ==
Williams attended Wenonah High School in Birmingham, Alabama. His mother died of breast cancer in 2010. He was rated as a four-star prospect and the 17th best defensive tackle in the country for the class of 2016 by the 247Sports Composite. Williams originally committed to Auburn University to play college football but changed to the University of Alabama on June 30, 2015.

== College career ==
After redshirting his first year at Alabama in 2016, Williams played in all 14 games as a redshirt freshman in 2017, recording 20 tackles and two sacks. He had two tackles in the 2018 College Football Playoff National Championship victory over Georgia.

Williams was named the starting nose guard prior to Alabama's 2018 season opener against Louisville. He accounted for six total tackles and 3.5 tackles for loss in the game and was named SEC Co-Defensive Line player of the week. In a shutout win against LSU on November 3, Williams had 10 total tackles, 3.5 for loss, and 2.5 sacks, and was named Walter Camp National Defensive Player of the Week and SEC Defensive Player of the Week.

After his redshirt sophomore season, Williams was named a unanimous first-team All-American and first-team All-SEC. He was awarded the Outland Trophy as the nation's best interior lineman. His 20 tackles for loss were tied for second in the SEC, and his eight sacks were tied for fifth in the conference.

On January 11, 2019, Williams announced that he would forgo his remaining two years of eligibility and enter the 2019 NFL draft.

== Professional career ==
Pre-draft measurables
Height	Weight	Arm length	Hand span	Wingspan	40-yard dash	10-yard split	20-yard split	Vertical jump	Broad jump	Wonderlic
6 ft 3 in (1.91 m)	303 lb (137 kg)	33 1/4 in (0.84 m)	9 5/8 in (0.24 m)	6 ft 8 1/4 in (2.04 m)	4.83 s	1.67 s	2.80 s	30.5 in (0.77 m)	9 ft 4 in (2.84 m)	11
All values from NFL Combine

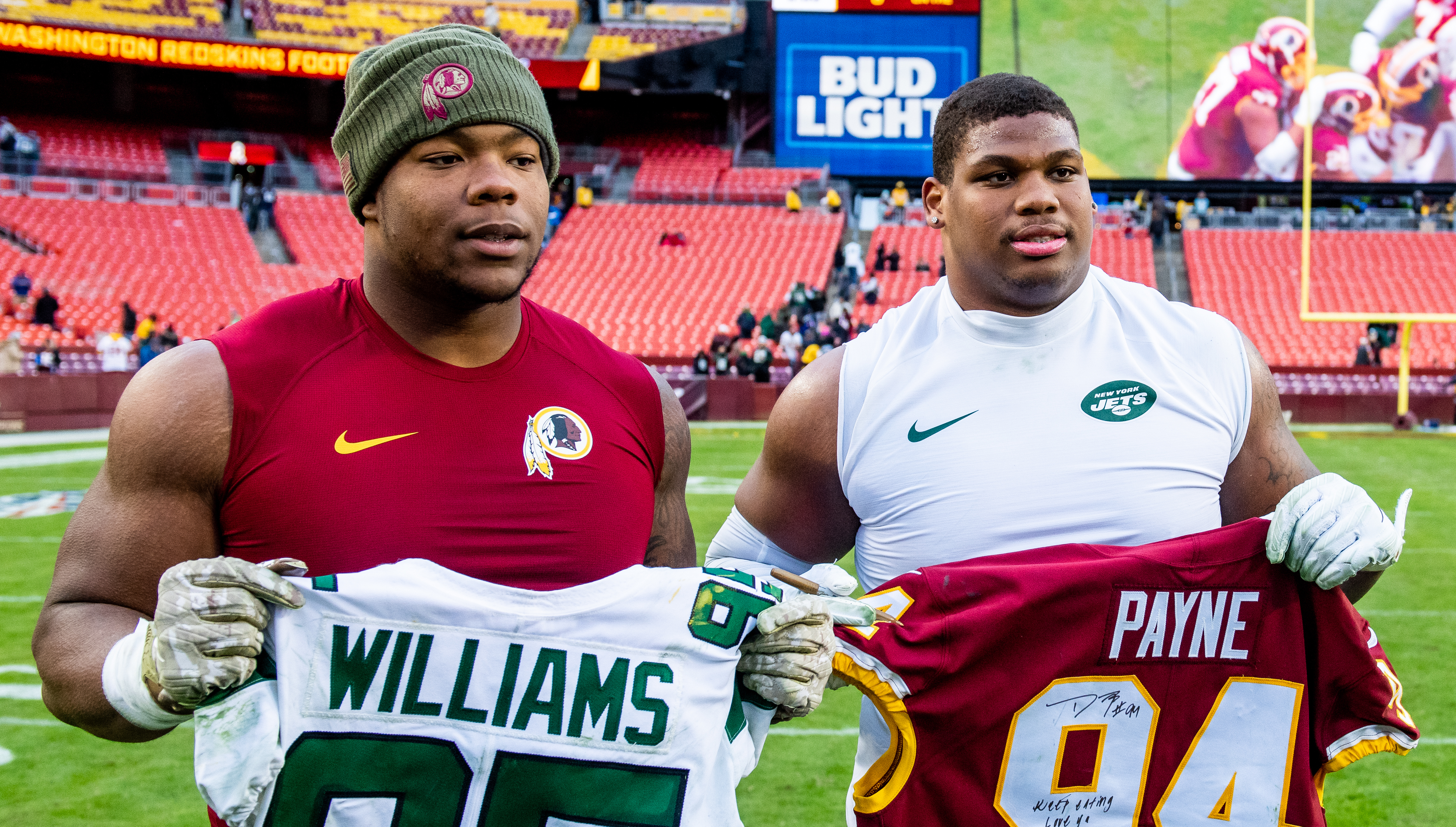
Williams (right) and Washington Redskins defensive tackle Daron Payne swap jerseys after a 2019 game

=== New York Jets ===
==== 2019 ====
Williams was selected by the New York Jets with the third overall pick in the 2019 NFL Draft. On July 25, 2019, Williams agreed to a four-year deal with the Jets worth $32.5 million featuring a $21.6 million signing bonus and a fifth year option. On August 26, 2019, Williams was fined $21,056 for a late hit on Matt Schaub in the second preseason game against the Atlanta Falcons.

Williams played his first regular season game on September 8, 2019 against the Buffalo Bills, but did not record a stat, and left the game in the third quarter due to an ankle injury. In Week 9 against the Miami Dolphins, Williams recorded his first career sack on Ryan Fitzpatrick in the 26–18 loss. In Week 10 against the New York Giants, Williams recorded his first career fumble recovery, securing a football lost by Golden Tate on the final play of the game in the Jets' 34–27 victory. In Week 16 against the Pittsburgh Steelers, Williams recorded his second sack of the season in the Jets' 16–10 win, though this would be his final tackle of the season. Overall, Williams would finish his rookie season with 28 tackles, 2.5 sacks and 1 fumble recovery in his 13 games played.

==== 2020 ====
In Week 2 against the San Francisco 49ers, Williams recorded his first two sacks of the season during the 31–13 loss. On October 10, Williams was fined $25,000 for two personal fouls that he committed in Week 4 against the Denver Broncos. In Week 12 against the Dolphins, Williams recorded 1.5 sacks on Ryan Fitzpatrick and forced a fumble on running back Matt Breida that was recovered by the Jets during the 20–3 loss. On December 23, 2020, Williams was placed on injured reserve, causing him to miss the final two games of the season. He received one All-Pro vote for the 2020 season.

==== 2021 ====
On May 4, 2021, it was revealed that Williams was diagnosed with a small fracture in his foot. He underwent surgery three days later.

On October 4 in a game against the Tennessee Titans, Quinnen and his brother Quincy, who joined the Jets earlier that season, made NFL history by each recording a sack in the win. In the 2021 season, he had six sacks, 53 tackles, and three passes defended.

==== 2022 ====
The Jets picked up the fifth-year option on Williams' contract on April 26, 2022. In Week 6, Williams had five tackles, two sacks, a forced fumble and a blocked field goal in a 27–10 win over the Green Bay Packers, earning AFC Defensive Player of the Week. In the 2022 season, he had 12 sacks, 55 tackles, four passes defended, two forced fumbles, and one fumble recovery.

==== 2023 ====
On July 13, 2023, Williams signed a four-year, $96 million contract extension with the Jets, including $66 million guaranteed. In Week 13, Williams, along with Ashtyn Davis, was credited with a safety against the Atlanta Falcons. In the 2023 season, he had 5.5 sacks, 62 tackles, one interception, three passes defended, one forced fumble, and one fumble recovery. He was ranked 37th by his fellow players on the NFL Top 100 Players of 2024.

==== 2024 ====
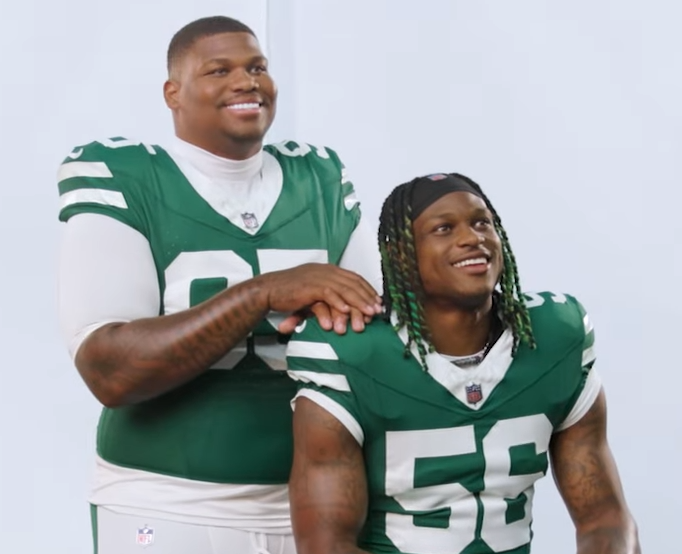
Williams (left) with his brother Quincy in 2025

In the 2024 season, Williams started in 16 games. He recorded six sacks, 37 tackles, and 18 quarterback hits. He was ranked 87th by his fellow players on the NFL Top 100 Players of 2025.

==== 2025 ====
In the first eight games of the 2025 NFL season, Williams recorded one sack, 32 tackles, and 3 quarterback hits with the New York Jets. He was traded mid-season to the Dallas Cowboys.

=== Dallas Cowboys ===
On November 4, 2025, the Jets traded Williams to the Dallas Cowboys in exchange for defensive tackle Mazi Smith, a second-round pick in the 2026 NFL draft, and a conditional (higher of Cowboys or Packers) first-round pick in the 2027 NFL draft.

Williams was named to his fourth consecutive Pro Bowl on December 23, 2025.

==== 2026 ====
On August 10, 2026, the Cowboys and Williams agreed to terms on a three-year, $105.9 million extension, making him one of the highest paid DL's in the league and the total contract spans five years and is worth $153.15 million with $101 million guaranteed.

== Career statistics ==
Legend
	Led the league
**Bold**	Career high

=== NFL ===
Year	Team	Games		Tackles							Fumbles				Interceptions					
Year	Team	GP	GS	Cmb	Solo	Ast	Sck	Sfty	TFL	Prss	FF	FR	Yds	TD	PD	Int	Yds	Avg	Lng	TD
2019	NYJ	13	9	28	15	13	2.5	0	4	11	0	**1**	0	0	1	0	0	0.0	0	0
2020	NYJ	13	13	55	32	**23**	7.0	0	10	20	2	0	0	0	3	0	0	0.0	0	0
2021	NYJ	15	15	53	36	17	6.0	0	7	16	0	0	0	0	3	0	0	0.0	0	0
2022	NYJ	16	16	55	35	20	**12.0**	0	**12**	**31**	2	**1**	**12**	0	**4**	0	0	0.0	0	0
2023	NYJ	17	17	**62**	**39**	**23**	5.5	**1**	11	29	1	**1**	0	0	3	**1**	**6**	**6.0**	**6**	0
2024	NYJ	16	16	37	25	12	6.0	0	8	27	0	0	0	0	0	0	0	0.0	0	0
2025	NYJ	8	8	32	17	15	1.0	0	7	7	**3**	0	0	0	0	0	0	0.0	0	0
2025	DAL	7	7	21	9	12	1.5	0	3	19	0	0	0	0	1	**1**	0	0.0	0	0
2026	DAL	5	5	15	7	8	1.0	0	4	5	1	0	0	0	0	0	0	0.0	0	0
Career		110	106	358	215	143	42.5	1	66	165	9	3	12	0	15	2	6	3.0	6	0

=== College ===
Season	Team	GP	Tackles					Interceptions					Fumbles			
Season	Team	GP	Solo	Ast	Cmb	TfL	Sck	Int	Yds	Avg	TD	PD	FR	Yds	TD	FF
2016	Alabama	0	Redshirt													
2017	Alabama	14	11	9	20	6.5	2.0	0	0	0.0	0	0	0	0	0	0
2018	Alabama	15	**45**	**26**	**71**	**19.5**	**8.0**	0	0	0.0	0	**1**	0	0	0	0
Total		29	56	35	91	26	10.0	0	0	0.0	0	1	0	0	0	0
