= 2023 All-Pro Team =

Official list of the best NFL players in 2023

The 2023 All-Pro teams were named by the Associated Press (AP), Pro Football Writers of America (PFWA), and The Sporting News (TSN) for performance in the 2023 NFL season. Any player selected to the first-team of any of the teams can be described as an "All-Pro." The AP team, with first-team and second-team selections, was chosen by a national panel of fifty NFL writers and broadcasters. The Sporting News All-NFL team was voted on by NFL players and executives. The PFWA team is selected by its more than 300 national members who are accredited media members covering the NFL.

For the 2023 vote, the AP added a slot cornerback position to the ballot.

== Teams ==
Offense
Position	First team	Second team
Quarterback	Lamar Jackson, Baltimore (AP, PFWA, TSN)	Dak Prescott, Dallas (AP-2)
Running back	Christian McCaffrey, San Francisco (AP, PFWA, TSN); Kyren Williams, Los Angeles Rams (PFWA); Raheem Mostert, Miami (TSN)	Kyren Williams, Los Angeles Rams (AP-2)
Fullback	Kyle Juszczyk, San Francisco (AP)	Patrick Ricard, Baltimore (AP-2)
Wide receiver	Tyreek Hill, Miami (AP, PFWA, TSN); CeeDee Lamb, Dallas (AP, PFWA, TSN); Amon-Ra St. Brown, Detroit (AP)	A. J. Brown, Philadelphia (AP-2); Puka Nacua, Los Angeles Rams (AP-2); Brandon Aiyuk, San Francisco (AP-2t); Mike Evans, Tampa Bay (AP-2t)
Tight end	George Kittle, San Francisco (AP, PFWA, TSN)	Sam LaPorta, Detroit (AP-2)
Left tackle	Trent Williams, San Francisco (AP)	Tyron Smith, Dallas (AP-2)
Left guard	Joe Thuney, Kansas City (AP)	Tyler Smith, Dallas (AP-2)
Center	Jason Kelce, Philadelphia (AP, PFWA, TSN)	Frank Ragnow, Detroit (AP-2)
Right guard	Zack Martin, Dallas (AP)	Chris Lindstrom, Atlanta (AP-2)
Right tackle	Penei Sewell, Detroit (AP)	Lane Johnson, Philadelphia (AP-2)
Tackle	Penei Sewell, Detroit (PFWA, TSN); Trent Williams, San Francisco (PFWA, TSN)	
Guard	Zack Martin, Dallas (PFWA, TSN); Joe Thuney, Kansas City (PFWA, TSN)	

Special teams
Position	First team	Second team
Kicker	Brandon Aubrey, Dallas (AP, PFWA, TSN)	Jake Elliott, Philadelphia (AP-2)
Punter	A. J. Cole, Las Vegas (AP, PFWA, TSN)	Bryan Anger, Dallas (AP-2)
Kick returner	Keisean Nixon, Green Bay (AP, PFWA); Marvin Mims, Denver (TSN)	Marvin Mims, Denver (AP-2)
Punt returner	Rashid Shaheed, New Orleans (AP, PFWA); Derius Davis, Los Angeles Chargers (TSN)	Derius Davis, Los Angeles Chargers (AP-2)
Special teamer	Miles Killebrew, Pittsburgh (AP, PFWA)	Jalen Reeves-Maybin, Detroit (AP-2)
Long snapper	Ross Matiscik, Jacksonville (AP)	Andrew DePaola, Minnesota (AP-2)

Defense
Position	First team	Second team
Edge rusher	Myles Garrett, Cleveland (AP); T. J. Watt, Pittsburgh (AP)	Micah Parsons, Dallas (AP-2); Maxx Crosby, Las Vegas (AP-2)
Defensive end	Myles Garrett, Cleveland (PFWA, TSN); Trey Hendrickson, Cincinnati (PFWA); Maxx Crosby, Las Vegas (TSN)	
Interior lineman/Defensive tackle	Aaron Donald, Los Angeles Rams (AP, PFWA, TSN); Chris Jones, Kansas City (AP, PFWA, TSN)	Nnamdi Madubuike, Baltimore (AP-2); Dexter Lawrence, New York Giants (AP-2)
Linebacker	Fred Warner, San Francisco (AP, PFWA, TSN); Roquan Smith, Baltimore (AP); Quincy Williams, New York Jets (AP); T. J. Watt, Pittsburgh (TSN); Micah Parsons, Dallas (TSN)	Demario Davis, New Orleans (AP-2); Bobby Wagner, Seattle (AP-2); Patrick Queen, Baltimore (AP-2)
Outside linebacker	Micah Parsons, Dallas (PFWA); T. J. Watt, Pittsburgh (PFWA)	
Cornerback	DaRon Bland, Dallas (AP, PFWA, TSN); Sauce Gardner, New York Jets (AP, PFWA, TSN)	Jaylon Johnson, Chicago (AP-2); Charvarius Ward, San Francisco (AP-2)
Slot cornerback	Trent McDuffie, Kansas City (AP)	Taron Johnson, Buffalo (AP-2)
Safety	Kyle Hamilton, Baltimore (AP, PFWA); Antoine Winfield Jr., Tampa Bay (AP, TSN); Jessie Bates III, Atlanta (PFWA, TSN)	Jessie Bates III, Atlanta (AP-2); Justin Simmons, Denver (AP-2)

AP source:
PFWA source:
TSN source:

For this season's AP ballot, San Francisco 49ers running back Christian McCaffrey, linebacker Fred Warner, and Miami Dolphins wide receiver Tyreek Hill were unanimous selections, receiving all 50 first-place votes at their respective positions.

== Key ==
- AP = Associated Press first-team All-Pro
- AP-2 = Associated Press second-team All-Pro
- AP-2t = Tied for second-team All-Pro in the AP vote
- PFWA = Pro Football Writers Association All-NFL
- TSN = The Sporting News All-Pro

== Number of AP selections per team ==
American Football Conference
Team	Selections
Baltimore Ravens	6
Buffalo Bills	1
Cincinnati Bengals	0
Cleveland Browns	1
Denver Broncos	2
Houston Texans	0
Indianapolis Colts	0
Jacksonville Jaguars	1
Kansas City Chiefs	3
Las Vegas Raiders	2
Los Angeles Chargers	1
Miami Dolphins	1
New England Patriots	0
New York Jets	2
Pittsburgh Steelers	2
Tennessee Titans	0

National Football Conference
Team	Selections
Arizona Cardinals	0
Atlanta Falcons	2
Carolina Panthers	0
Chicago Bears	1
Dallas Cowboys	9
Detroit Lions	5
Green Bay Packers	1
Los Angeles Rams	3
Minnesota Vikings	1
New Orleans Saints	2
New York Giants	1
Philadelphia Eagles	4
San Francisco 49ers	7
Seattle Seahawks	1
Tampa Bay Buccaneers	2
Washington Commanders	0

== Position differences ==
PFWA and TSN do not separate the tackles and guards into more specific positions as the AP does. Additionally, PFWA and TSN formally select defensive ends as opposed to edge rushers, while PFWA selects outside linebackers separately from middle linebackers.
