= Quincy Williams =

American football player (born 1996)

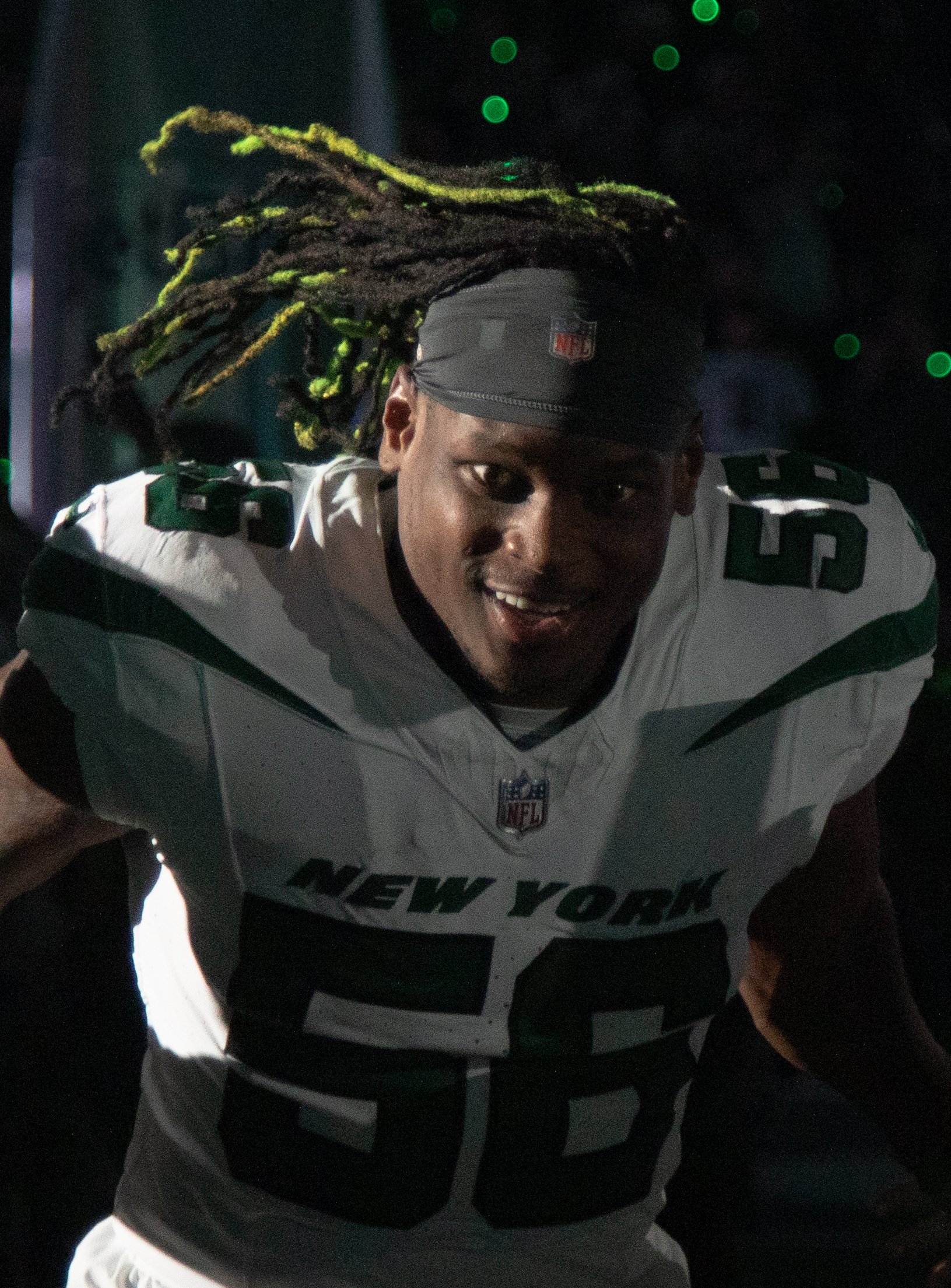
- Williams with the New York Jets in 2023

No. 5 – Cleveland Browns
- Position: Linebacker
- Roster status: Active

Personal information
- Born: August 28, 1996 (age 30); Birmingham, Alabama, U.S.
- Listed height: 5 ft 11 in (1.80 m)
- Listed weight: 230 lb (104 kg)

Career information
- High school: Wenonah (Birmingham)
- College: Murray State (2014–2018)
- NFL draft: 2019: 3rd round, 98th overall pick

Career history
- Jacksonville Jaguars (2019–2020); New York Jets (2021–2025); Cleveland Browns (2026–present)

Awards and highlights
- First-team All-Pro (2023)

Career NFL statistics as of Week 10, 2026
- Total tackles: 684
- Sacks: 13.5
- Forced fumbles: 14
- Fumble recoveries: 4
- Pass deflections: 32
- Interceptions: 1
- Stats at Pro Football Reference

Quincy Williams (born August 28, 1996) is an American professional football linebacker for the Cleveland Browns of the National Football League (NFL). He played college football for the Murray State Racers and was selected by the Jacksonville Jaguars in the third round of the 2019 NFL draft. He is the older brother of Quinnen Williams.

== College career ==
Quincy Williams played multiple positions at Murray State University. He redshirted his freshman year in 2014. In 2015, he played in 11 games with three starts. He finished the season with 31 tackles and a pass breakup. In 2016, he played in 10 game with three starts with 32 tackles, 13 solo with one pass breakup. His senior year, he played in all 11 games and finished the season with 78 tackles and two interceptions, one being a pick six.

== Professional career ==
Pre-draft measurables
Height	Weight	Arm length	Hand span	Wingspan	40-yard dash	10-yard split	20-yard split	20-yard shuttle	Three-cone drill	Vertical jump	Broad jump	Bench press
5 ft 10 5/8 in (1.79 m)	225 lb (102 kg)	33 in (0.84 m)	9 7/8 in (0.25 m)	6 ft 8 7/8 in (2.05 m)	4.59 s	1.62 s	2.64 s	4.41 s	7.25 s	39.5 in (1.00 m)	10 ft 4 in (3.15 m)	17 reps
All values from Pro Day

=== Jacksonville Jaguars ===
Williams in September 2019

Williams was drafted by the Jacksonville Jaguars in the third round with the 98th overall pick in the 2019 NFL draft. The Jaguars previously acquired this selection in a trade that sent Dante Fowler to the Los Angeles Rams.

As a rookie, Williams was named a starting outside linebacker to begin the season. He played in 11 games with eight starts before being placed on injured reserve on December 11, 2019. He finished the season with 48 tackles.

On September 8, 2020, Williams was placed on injured reserve. He was designated to return from injured reserve on September 30, and began practicing with the team again. He was activated on October 10, 2020.

On August 31, 2021, Williams was waived by the Jaguars as part of final roster cuts.

=== New York Jets ===
On September 1, 2021, the New York Jets claimed Williams off waivers.

On August 20, 2022, Williams was fined $10,609 for a late hit he made on Jalen Hurts during the first preseason game against the Philadelphia Eagles.

On March 15, 2023, Williams signed a three-year, $18 million contract extension with the Jets.

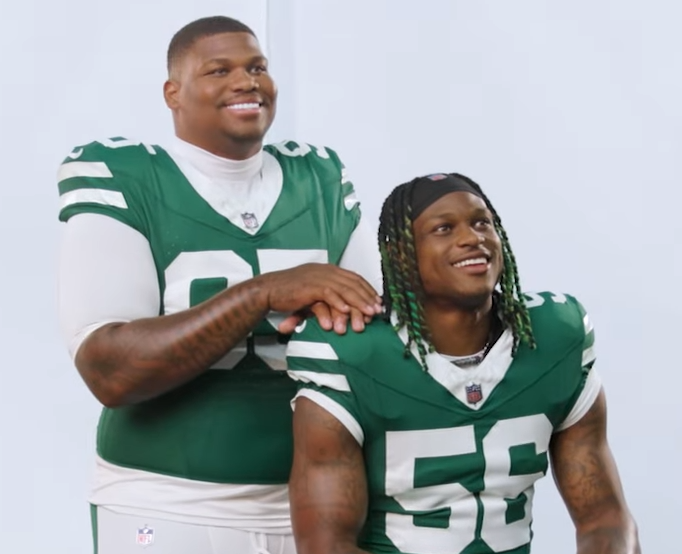
Williams (right) with his brother Quinnen in 2025

In October 2023, Williams was named American Football Conference Defensive Player of the Month for his performance.

Williams began the 2025 season as one of the Jets' starting linebackers. In Week 3 against the Tampa Bay Buccaneers, Williams suffered a shoulder injury, causing him to be placed on injured reserve on September 23, 2025. He was activated on October 25, ahead of the team's Week 8 matchup against the Cincinnati Bengals.

=== Cleveland Browns ===
On March 11, 2026, Williams signed a two-year, $17 million contract with the Cleveland Browns.

== NFL career statistics ==
Year	Team	Games		Tackles					Interceptions						Fumbles			
Year	Team	GP	GS	Cmb	Solo	Ast	TFL	Sck	PD	Int	Yds	Avg	Lng	TD	FF	FR	Yds	TD
2019	JAX	11	8	48	30	18	2	0.0	0	0	0	0.0	0	0	0	0	0	0
2020	JAX	7	0	11	5	6	1	0.0	1	0	0	0.0	0	0	1	0	0	0
2021	NYJ	16	13	110	73	37	9	2.0	5	0	0	0.0	0	0	3	0	0	0
2022	NYJ	15	15	106	74	32	12	3.0	1	0	0	0.0	0	0	0	0	0	0
2023	NYJ	17	16	139	95	44	15	2.0	10	1	11	11.0	11	0	2	1	0	0
2024	NYJ	17	17	116	74	42	14	2.0	4	0	0	0.0	0	0	4	3	19	0
2025	NYJ	13	12	83	45	38	8	3.5	7	0	0	0.0	0	0	0	0	0	0
2026	CLE	10	10	71	42	29	6	1.0	4	0	0	0.0	0	0	4	0	0	0
Career		106	91	684	438	246	67	13.5	32	1	11	11.0	11	0	14	4	19	0
