= 2028 NFL draft =

2028 American football draft

General information
- Date: c. April 2028
- Location: Minneapolis, Minnesota
- Networks: ESPN, ABC, NFL Network, ESPN Deportes, ESPN Radio

Overview
- 256 total selections in 7 rounds
- League: National Football League

The 2028 NFL draft will be the 93rd annual meeting of National Football League (NFL) franchises to select newly eligible players. The event is scheduled to be held in Minneapolis on c. April 2028.

== Host city ==
On May 19, 2026, it was announced that Minneapolis would be the host city.

== Trades involving draft picks ==
In the explanations below (PD) indicates trades completed prior to the start of the draft (i.e. Pre–Draft), while (D) denotes trades that take place during the 2028 draft.

=== Round 1 ===
- New England → Philadelphia (PD). New England traded a first-round selection and a 2027 fifth-round selection to Philadelphia in exchange for WR A. J. Brown.
- Chicago → Tennessee (PD). Chicago traded a first-round selection, and 2027 first- and fourth-round selection to Tennessee in exchange for a fifth-round selection and DT Jeffery Simmons.

=== Round 2 ===
- LA Rams → Cleveland (PD). LA Rams traded a second-round selection, a 2027 first-round selection, a 2029 third-round selection, and OLB Jared Verse to Cleveland in exchange for DE Myles Garrett.
- Dallas → Pittsburgh (PD). Dallas traded a second-round selection and a 2027 conditional sixth-round selection to Pittsburgh in exchange for CB Joey Porter Jr..
- Baltimore → Philadelphia (PD). Baltimore traded a second-round selection and a 2027 fifth-round selection to Philadelphia in exchange for a 2027 seventh-round selection and C Cam Jurgens.

=== Round 5 ===
- Seattle → Indianapolis (PD). Seattle traded a fifth-round selection and a 2027 third-round selection to Indianapolis in exchange for G Quenton Nelson.
- Tennessee → Chicago (PD). See Round 1: Chicago → Tennessee.
- Jacksonville → Atlanta (PD). Jacksonville traded a fifth-round selection and a 2027 second-round selection to Atlanta in exchange for S Jessie Bates.

=== Round 6 ===
- New Orleans → Dallas (PD). New Orleans traded a sixth-round selection to Dallas in exchange for a seventh-round selection and T Asim Richards.
- Jacksonville → Miami (PD). Jacksonville traded a sixth-round selection to Miami in exchange for QB Quinn Ewers.
- Carolina → LA Chargers (PD). Carolina traded a sixth-round selection to LA Chargers in exchange for DT TeRah Edwards.
- Jacksonville → New Orleans (PD). Jacksonville traded a conditional sixth-round selection to New Orleans in exchange for DT Davon Godchaux. The condition – which may be upgraded to a 2027 sixth-round pick if Jacksonville receives a 2027 sixth-round pick through a trade or compensatory process.
- Detroit → NY Jets (PD). Detroit traded a sixth-round selection to NY Jets in exchange for S Andre Cisco.
- Baltimore → Atlanta (PD). Baltimore traded a sixth-round selection and G Andrew Vorhees to Atlanta in exchange for C Ryan Neuzil.

=== Round 7 ===
- New England → New Orleans (PD). New England traded a seventh-round selection and WR Ja'Lynn Polk to New Orleans in exchange for a 2027 sixth-round selection.
- Cleveland → LA Rams (PD). Cleveland traded a seventh-round selection to LA Rams in exchange for T KT Leveston.
- Dallas → New Orleans (PD). See Round 6: New Orleans → Dallas.
- NY Jets → LA Chargers (PD). NY Jets traded a conditional seventh-round selection to LA Chargers in exchange for CB Ja'Sir Taylor.
- Seattle → NY Jets (PD). Seattle traded a conditional seventh-round selection to NY Jets in exchange for WR Irvin Charles.
- Houston → New England (PD). Houston traded a seventh-round selection and S Jaylen Reed to New England in exchange for WR Kayshon Boutte.
- Baltimore → Arizona (PD). Baltimore traded a seventh-round selection and a 2027 fourth-round selection to Arizona in exchange for a 2027 fifth-round selection and QB Jacoby Brissett.

== Resolution JC-2A picks ==
Resolution JC-2A, enacted by the NFL in November 2020, rewards teams for developing minority candidates for head coach and/or general manager positions. The resolution rewards teams whose minority candidates are hired away for one of those positions by awarding draft picks. These draft picks are at the end of the third round, after standard compensatory picks; if multiple teams qualify, they are awarded by draft order in the first round. These picks are in addition to, and have no impact on, the standard 32 compensatory picks.
