= 2025 Houston Texans season =

24th season in franchise history

- Owner: Cal McNair
- General manager: Nick Caserio
- Head coach: DeMeco Ryans
- Offensive coordinator: Nick Caley
- Defensive coordinator: Matt Burke
- Home stadium: NRG Stadium

Results
- Record: 12–5
- Division place: 2nd AFC South
- Playoffs: Won Wild Card Playoffs (at Steelers) 30–6; Lost Divisional Playoffs (at Patriots) 16–28
- All-Pros: DE Will Anderson Jr. (1st team); CB Derek Stingley Jr. (1st team); DE Danielle Hunter (2nd team)
- Pro Bowlers: 6: ILB Azeez Al-Shaair; DE Will Anderson Jr.; WR Nico Collins; CB Derek Stingley Jr.; FS Calen Bullock; CB Kamari Lassiter

Uniform
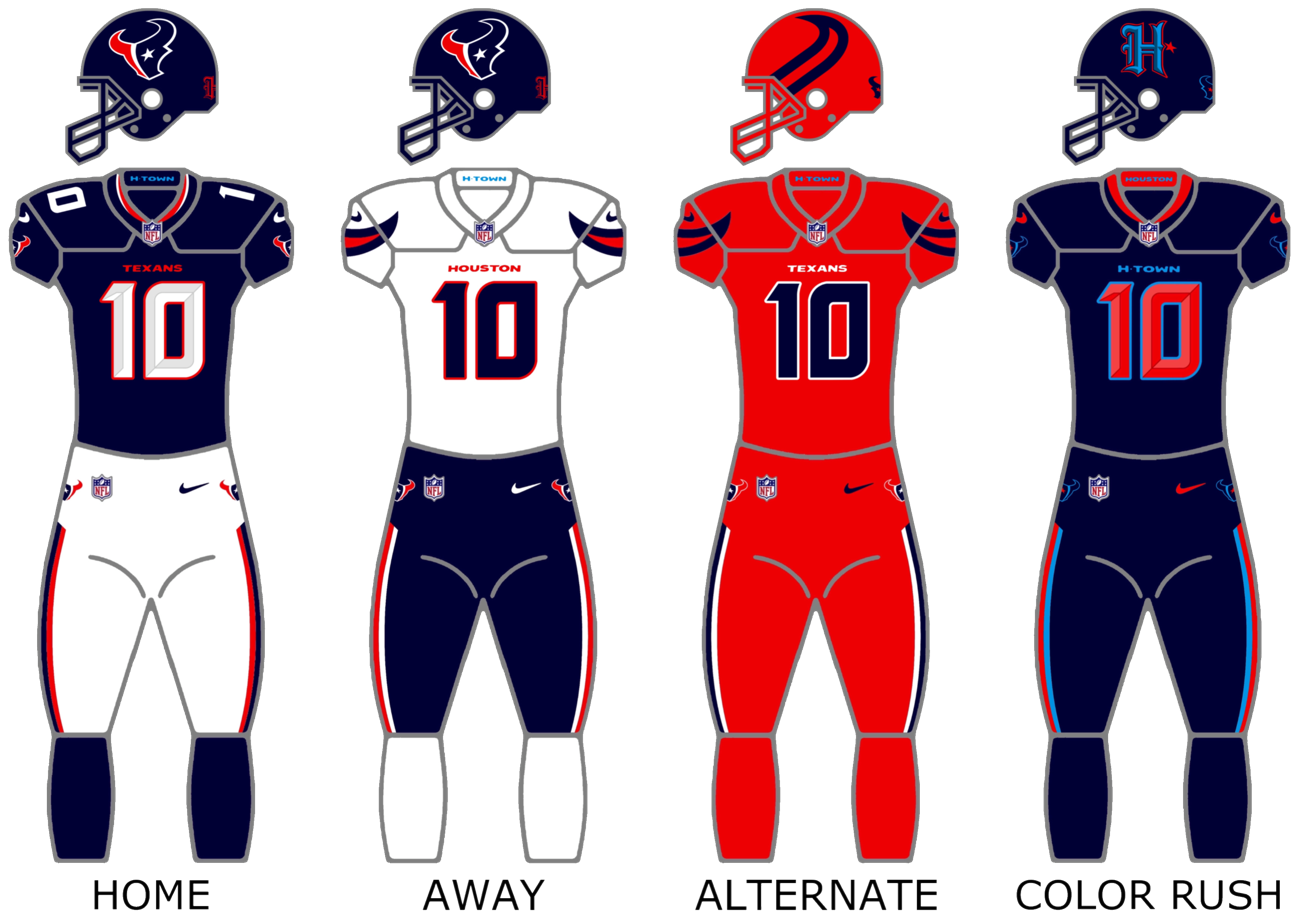

The 2025 season was the Houston Texans' 24th in the National Football League (NFL), their fifth under general manager Nick Caserio and their third under head coach DeMeco Ryans. The Texans improved on their 10–7 record from previous two seasons after a win against the Los Angeles Chargers in Week 17, making the playoffs for the third consecutive season for the first time in franchise history. This is the first time in Texans history that they made the playoffs as a Wild Card team as they failed to hold their AFC South title after the Jacksonville Jaguars beat the Tennessee Titans in Week 18. For the first time since 2009, Jon Weeks was not on the team's roster, as he signed with the San Francisco 49ers.

The Texans began the season with a 0–3 record for the first time since the 2020 season and stood at 3–5 through Week 9. The team later rebounded with a nine-game winning streak following a victory over the Indianapolis Colts, finishing the regular season with a 12–5 record and surpassing their combined win total from the previous two seasons. Houston reached the playoffs for the second time in franchise history after starting 0–3, having previously done so in 2018, and became the first NFL team to accomplish the feat multiple times. They entered the playoffs the No. 5 seed in the AFC.

The Texans recorded their first road postseason victory with a 30–6 win over the Pittsburgh Steelers in the Wild Card Round, but the team's season would end when they were defeated by the New England Patriots by a final score of 28–16 in the Divisional Round (highlighted by quarterback CJ Stroud throwing four interceptions in the first half), preventing them from making their first AFC Championship Game appearance in franchise history.

The Houston Texans drew an average home attendance of 70,782, the 11th-highest of all NFL teams.

== Draft ==
2025 Houston Texans draft selections
Round	Selection	Player	Position	College	Notes
1	25	Traded to the New York Giants (Note: The Texans traded the 25th overall pick to the Giants in exchange for a second-round selection (34th overall) and a third-round selection (99th overall).)			
2	34	Jayden Higgins	WR	Iowa State	From New York Giants
2	48	Aireontae Ersery	OT	Minnesota	From Dolphins via Las Vegas Raiders
2	56	Traded to the Buffalo Bills (Note: The Texans traded a second-round selection (56th overall) to the Buffalo Bills in exchange for a fifth-round selection (166th overall), a 2024 sixth-round selection and WR Stefon Diggs.)			From Vikings (Note: The Texans traded 2024 first- and seventh-round selections to the Minnesota Vikings in exchange for a second-round selection (56th overall), and 2024 second- and sixth-round selections.)
2	58	Traded to the Las Vegas Raiders			
3	79	Jaylin Noel	WR	Iowa State	From Dolphins via Eagles and Commanders (Note: The Texans traded Laremy Tunsil and a fourth-round selection (128th overall) to the Washington Commanders in exchange for a 2025 third-round selection (79th selection), a seventh-round selection (236th overall), and 2026 second and fourth-round selections.)
3	89	Traded to the Jacksonville Jaguars			
3	97	Jaylin Smith	CB	USC	From Vikings
3	99	Traded to the Raiders			Compensatory selection; from New York Giants
3	102	Traded to the Vikings			Compensatory selection; From Jacksonville Jaguars
4	116	Woody Marks	RB	USC	From Miami
4	128	Traded to the Washington Commanders			
5	142	Traded to the Vikings			From Jacksonville Jaguars
5	161	Traded to the Philadelphia Eagles (Note: The Texans traded a fifth-round selection (161st overall) and a 2024 fourth-round selection (127th overall) to the Philadelphia Eagles in exchange for a 2024 fourth-round selection (123rd overall).)			
5	166	Traded to the Cleveland Browns (Note: The Texans traded a fifth round selection (166th overall) and a 2027 fifth-round selection to the Cleveland Browns in exchange for two 2025 sixth-round selections (179th overall and 216th overall) and a 2025 seventh-round selection (255th overall).)			From Bills
6	179	Traded to the Miami Dolphins			From Cleveland Browns
6	187	Jaylen Reed	S	Penn State	From Vikings
6	197	Graham Mertz	QB	Florida	From Denver
6	202	Traded to the Pittsburgh Steelers (Note: The Texans traded a sixth-round selection (202nd overall) to the Pittsburgh Steelers in exchange for G Kendrick Green.)			
6	216	Traded to the Denver Broncos			Compensatory selection; from Cleveland Browns
7	224	Kyonte Hamilton	DT	Rutgers	From Miami
7	236	Traded to the Jacksonville Jaguars			From Broncos via Eagles and Commanders
7	241	Traded to the Denver Broncos			
7	255	Luke Lachey	TE	Iowa	Compensatory selecton; from Cleveland Browns

2025 Houston Texans undrafted free agents
Name	Position	College	Ref.
Austin Brinkman	LS	West Virginia	
Eli Cox	C	Kentucky	
Alijah Huzzie	CB	North Carolina	
Daniel Jackson	WR	Minnesota	
K. C. Ossai	LB	Louisiana-Lafayette	
Junior Tafuna	DT	Utah	

Draft trades

== Staff ==
=== Offseason changes ===
On January 24, the Texans announced that offensive coordinator Bobby Slowik and offensive line coach Chris Strausser had been fired. On February 3, Los Angeles Rams tight ends coach and passing game coordinator Nick Caley was hired as the Texans' new offensive coordinator. The following day, February 4, Houston's assistant offensive line coach Cole Popovich was promoted to offensive line coach, while also being named the team's run game coordinator.

=== Final staff ===
2025 Houston Texans staff
Front office: Owner/CEO/chairman – Cal McNair; President – Mike Tomon; Executive vice president/general manager – Nick Caserio; Executive vice president/general counsel – Greg Kondritz; Assistant GM– James Liipfert; Assistant GM – Chris Blanco; Co-directors of college scouting – Mozique McCurtis and John Richter; Director of pro scouting – D. J. Debick; Senior personnel executive/assistant director of pro scouting – Steve Cargile; Senior director of football administration - Andrew Brown; Senior Director of Football Research and Game Management - Frank Edgerly; Assistant Director of Special Projects and Game Management - Rohit Mogalayapali; Director of college scouting operations - Tom Hayden; Director of Football Technology and Analytics - Tim Brog; Assistant director of football analytics - Kevin Clark; Head coaches: Head coach – DeMeco Ryans; Assistant head coach/running backs – Danny Barrett; Offensive coaches: Offensive coordinator – Nick Caley; Quarterbacks – Jerrod Johnson; Wide receivers/offensive passing game coordinator – Ben McDaniels; Tight ends – Jake Moreland; Offensive line/offensive run game coordinator – Cole Popovich; Assistant offensive line – Zach Yenser; Senior offensive assistant – Bill Lazor; Senior offensive assistant/pass game specialist – Jerry Schuplinski; Offensive assistant – Pat Reilly; Offensive assistant – Asauni Rufus; Offensive assistant – Mike Snyder	Defensive coaches: Defensive coordinator – Matt Burke; Defensive passing game coordinator – Cory Undlin; Defensive line – Rod Wright; Assistant defensive line – Frank Okam; Linebackers – Billy Davis; Assistant linebackers – Ben Bolling; Defensive backs – Dino Vasso; Safeties – Stephen Adegoke; Defensive assistant – Cole Weeks; Special teams coaches: Special teams coordinator – Frank Ross; Special teams/defensive assistant – Sean Baker; Assistant special teams – Will Burnham; Assistant to the coaches – Jake Olson; Strength and conditioning: Head strength and conditioning – Mike Eubanks; Assistant strength and conditioning – Chris Cervantes; Assistant strength and conditioning – Joe Distor; Assistant strength and conditioning – Pat Moorer

== Final roster ==
2025 Houston Texans roster
Quarterbacks (QB): 18 Graham Mertz; 10 Davis Mills; 7 C. J. Stroud; Running backs (RB): 44 British Brooks; 21 Nick Chubb; 26 Jawhar Jordan; 27 Woody Marks; 33 Dare Ogunbowale; Wide receivers (WR): 17 Braxton Berrios; 12 Nico Collins; 81 Jayden Higgins; 19 Xavier Hutchinson; 13 Christian Kirk; 14 Jaylin Noel; 84 Justin Watson; Tight ends (TE): 88 Harrison Bryant; 86 Dalton Schultz; 87 Cade Stover	Offensive linemen (OL): 60 Jake Andrews C; 77 Trent Brown T; 79 Aireontae Ersery T; 57 Blake Fisher T; 71 Tytus Howard T/G; 69 Ed Ingram G; 63 Jarrett Kingston G/T; 54 Jarrett Patterson G/C; 70 Juice Scruggs G; Defensive linemen (DL): 51 Will Anderson Jr. DE; 96 Denico Autry DE; 95 Derek Barnett DE; 92 Dylan Horton DE; 55 Danielle Hunter DE; 91 Naquan Jones DT; 90 Sheldon Rankins DT; 72 Tommy Togiai DT	Linebackers (LB): 0 Azeez Al-Shaair MLB; 31 Damone Clark MLB; 48 Christian Harris OLB; 56 Jamal Hill OLB; 45 E. J. Speed OLB; 39 Henry To'oTo'o OLB; Defensive backs (DB): 25 Myles Bryant CB; 2 Calen Bullock FS; 36 Alijah Huzzie CB; 42 Ja'Marcus Ingram CB; 4 Kamari Lassiter CB; 5 Jalen Pitre SS; 23 Jaylen Reed FS/SS; 11 Tremon Smith CB; 24 Derek Stingley Jr. CB; Special teams (ST): 40 Austin Brinkman LS; 15 Kaʻimi Fairbairn K; 6 Tommy Townsend P	Practice squad: 50 Solomon Byrd DE; 16 Quintez Cephus WR; 65 Eli Cox C; 94 Marlon Davidson DT; 47 Power Echols MLB; 58 Leki Fotu DT; 36 Brandon Hill FS; 43 Jakob Johnson FB; 85 Josh Kelly WR; 83 Luke Lachey TE; 32 Kaevon Merriweather CB (PS/I); 64 Haggai Ndubuisi DT (IPP); 47 Layne Pryor TE (PS/I); 62 Sidy Sow G; 37 Ameer Speed CB; 53 Junior Tafuna DT; 59 Xavier Thomas DE; 38 K'Von Wallace SS; 89 Jared Wayne WR; Reserve: 34 Ajani Carter CB (IR); -- Ronald Darby CB Ret.; 3 Tank Dell WR (PUP); 97 Mario Edwards Jr. DT (IR); 91 Folorunso Fatukasi DT (IR); 58 Kyonte Hamilton DT (IR); 35 Jake Hansen OLB (IR); 93 Kurt Hinish DT (PUP); 9 Brevin Jordan TE (IR); 28 Joe Mixon RB (NF-Inj.); 98 Tim Settle DT (IR); 22 Jaylin Smith CB (IR); 29 M. J. Stewart SS (IR); 20 Jimmie Ward FS (PUP); Rookies in italics 53 active, 14 reserve, 16 practice squad (3 exempt)

== Preseason ==
=== Schedule ===
Week	Date	Opponent	Result	Record	Venue	Recap
1	August 9	at Minnesota Vikings	L 10–20	0–1	U.S. Bank Stadium	Recap
2	August 16	Carolina Panthers	W 20–3	1–1	NRG Stadium	Recap
3	August 23	at Detroit Lions	W 26–7	2–1	Ford Field	Recap

=== Game summaries ===
==== Preseason Week 1: at Minnesota Vikings ====
Preseason Week 1: Houston Texans at Minnesota Vikings – Game summary

Quarter	1	2	3	4	Total
Texans	7	0	3	0	10
Vikings	3	10	0	7	20

at U.S. Bank Stadium, Minneapolis, Minnesota

- Date: August 9
- Game time: 3:00 p.m. CDT
- Game weather: None (indoor stadium)
- Game attendance: 66,715
- Referee: Brad Allen
- TV announcers (KTRK/NFLN): Kevin Kugler, ND Kalu, John Harris and Shelby Coppedge
- Recap

Game information

First quarter

- MIN – Will Reichard 48-yard field goal, 8:57. Vikings 3–0. Drive: 13 plays, 58 yards, 6:03.
- HOU – Braxton Berrios 14-yard pass from Davis Mills (Ka'imi Fairbairn kick), 3:54. Texans 7–3. Drive: 10 plays, 74 yards, 5:03.

Second quarter

- MIN – Will Reichard 38-yard field goal, 12:27. Texans 7–6. Drive: 12 plays, 40 yards, 6:27.
- MIN – Sam Howell 1-yard run (Will Reichard kick), 3:20. Vikings 13–7. Drive: 14 plays, 94 yards, 7:10.

Third quarter

- HOU – Ka'imi Fairbairn 43-yard field goal, 9:42. Vikings 13–10. Drive: 10 plays, 48 yards, 5:18.

Fourth quarter

- MIN – Myles Price 3-yard pass from Max Brosmer (Will Reichard kick), 9:48. Vikings 20–10. Drive: 9 plays, 40 yards, 3:48.

Top passers

- HOU – Kedon Slovis – 11/15, 71 yards
- MIN – Sam Howell – 11/13, 105 yards

Top rushers

- HOU – Dare Ogunbowale – 5 rushes, 29 yards
- MIN – Zavier Scott – 7 rushes, 40 yards

Top receivers

- HOU – John Metchie III – 5 receptions, 45 yards
- MIN – Jordan Addison – 3 receptions, 33 yards

==== Preseason Week 2: vs. Carolina Panthers ====
Preseason Week 2: Carolina Panthers at Houston Texans – Game summary

Quarter	1	2	3	4	Total
Panthers	0	3	0	0	3
Texans	7	3	3	7	20

at NRG Stadium, Houston, Texas

- Date: August 16
- Game time: 12:00 p.m. CST
- Game weather: None (retractable roof closed)
- Game attendance: 60,728
- Referee: John Hussey
- TV announcers (KTRK): Kevin Kugler, ND Kalu, John Harris and Shelby Coppedge
- Recap

Game information

First quarter

- HOU – Nico Collins 5-yard pass from C. J. Stroud (Ka'imi Fairbairn kick), 4:03. Texans 7–0. Drive: 11 plays, 60 yards, 5:57.

Second quarter

- CAR – Ryan Fitzgerald 52-yard field goal, 1:04. Texans 7–3. Drive: 5 plays, 20 yards, 2:03.
- HOU – Ka'imi Fairbairn 41-yard field goal, 0:00. Texans 10–3. Drive: 7 plays, 45 yards, 1:04.

Third quarter

- HOU – Ka'imi Fairbairn 35-yard field goal, 10:29. Texans 13–3. Drive: 11 plays, 55 yards, 4:31.

Fourth quarter

- HOU – British Brooks 1-yard run (Ka'imi Fairbairn kick), 12:08. Texans 20–3. Drive: 3 plays, 6 yards, 1:16.

Top passers

- CAR – Jack Plummer – 10/14, 82 yards, 2 INT
- HOU – Davis Mills – 8/14, 61 yards

Top rushers

- CAR – Kay'Ron Lynch-Adams – 5 rushes, 27 yards
- HOU – Woody Marks – 7 rushes, 40 yards

Top receivers

- CAR – Brycen Tremayne – 3 receptions, 46 yards
- HOU – Irv Smith Jr. – 5 receptions, 46 yards

==== Preseason Week 3: at Detroit Lions ====
Preseason Week 3: Houston Texans at Detroit Lions – Game summary

Quarter	1	2	3	4	Total
Texans	3	13	0	10	26
Lions	7	0	0	0	7

at Ford Field, Detroit, Michigan

- Date: August 23
- Game time: 1:00 p.m. EST/12:00 p.m. CST
- Game weather: None (indoor stadium)
- Game attendance: 49,017
- Referee: Clay Martin
- TV announcers (KTRK): Kevin Kugler, ND Kalu, John Harris and Shelby Coppedge
- Recap

Game information

First quarter

- HOU – Ka'imi Fairbairn 53-yard field goal, 7:12. Texans 3–0. Drive: 9 plays, 46 yards, 5:30.
- DET – Isaac TeSlaa 33-yard pass from Kyle Allen (Jake Bates kick), 1:52. Lions 7–3. Drive: 10 plays, 85 yards, 5:20.

Second quarter

- HOU – Woody Marks 9-yard run (Ka'imi Fairbairn kick), 12:22. Texans 10–7. Drive: 8 plays, 50 yards, 4:30.
- HOU – Quintez Cephus 6-yard pass from Graham Mertz (kick blocked), 4:46. Texans 16–7. Drive: 11 plays, 89 yards, 5:31.

Third quarter

- No scoring plays

Fourth quarter

- HOU – Daniel Jackson 3-yard pass from Kedon Slovis (Ka'imi Fairbairn kick), 12:58. Texans 23–7. Drive: 4 plays, 28 yards, 1:44.
- HOU – Ka'imi Fairbairn 48-yard field goal, 6:35. Texans 26–7. Drive: 9 plays, 26 yards, 4:02.

Top passers

- HOU – Graham Mertz – 14/16, 145 yards, TD
- DET – Hendon Hooker – 6/11, 70 yards, INT

Top rushers

- HOU – Jawhar Jordan – 13 rushes, 55 yards
- DET – Jacob Saylors – 9 rushes, 32 yards

Top receivers

- HOU – Cornell Powell – 6 receptions, 63 yards
- DET – Isaac TeSlaa – 2 receptions, 41 yards, TD

== Regular season ==
=== Schedule ===
Week	Date	Opponent	Result	Record	Venue	Recap
1	September 7	at Los Angeles Rams	**L** 9–14	0–1	SoFi Stadium	Recap
2	September 15	Tampa Bay Buccaneers	**L** 19–20	0–2	NRG Stadium	Recap
3	September 21	at **Jacksonville Jaguars**	**L** 10–17	0–3	EverBank Stadium	Recap
4	September 28	**Tennessee Titans**	**W** 26–0	1–3	NRG Stadium	Recap
5	October 5	at Baltimore Ravens	**W** 44–10	2–3	M&T Bank Stadium	Recap
6	Bye					
7	October 20	at Seattle Seahawks	**L** 19–27	2–4	Lumen Field	Recap
8	October 26	San Francisco 49ers	**W** 26–15	3–4	NRG Stadium	Recap
9	November 2	Denver Broncos	**L** 15–18	3–5	NRG Stadium	Recap
10	November 9	**Jacksonville Jaguars**	**W** 36–29	4–5	NRG Stadium	Recap
11	November 16	at **Tennessee Titans**	**W** 16–13	5–5	Nissan Stadium	Recap
12	November 20	Buffalo Bills	**W** 23–19	6–5	NRG Stadium	Recap
13	November 30	at **Indianapolis Colts**	**W** 20–16	7–5	Lucas Oil Stadium	Recap
14	December 7	at Kansas City Chiefs	**W** 20–10	8–5	Arrowhead Stadium	Recap
15	December 14	Arizona Cardinals	**W** 40–20	9–5	NRG Stadium	Recap
16	December 21	Las Vegas Raiders	**W** 23–21	10–5	NRG Stadium	Recap
17	December 27	at Los Angeles Chargers	**W** 20–16	11–5	SoFi Stadium	Recap
18	January 4	**Indianapolis Colts**	**W** 38–30	12–5	NRG Stadium	Recap

Note: Intra-division opponents are in bold text.

=== Game summaries ===
==== Week 1: at Los Angeles Rams ====
Week 1: Houston Texans at Los Angeles Rams – Game summary

Quarter	1	2	3	4	Total
Texans	3	6	0	0	**9**
**Rams**	0	7	7	0	**14**

at SoFi Stadium, Inglewood, California

- Date: September 7
- Game time: 3:25 p.m. CDT/1:25 p.m. PDT
- Game weather: Sunny, 83 °F (28 °C) (fixed roof)
- Game attendance: 71,346
- Referee: Craig Wrolstad
- TV announcers (CBS): Kevin Harlan, Trent Green and Melanie Collins
- Recap, Game Book

Game information

**First quarter**

- HOU – Ka'imi Fairbairn 51-yard field goal, 1:15. Texans 3–0. **Drive: 13 plays, 62 yards, 7:01.**

**Second quarter**

- HOU – Ka'imi Fairbairn 45-yard field goal, 4:47. Texans 6–0. **Drive: 10 plays, 19 yards, 5:25.**
- LAR – Kyren Williams 1-yard run (Joshua Karty kick), 0:53. Rams 7–6. **Drive: 9 plays, 65 yards, 3:54.**
- HOU – Ka'imi Fairbairn 53-yard field goal, 0:00. Texans 9–7. **Drive: 5 plays, 42 yards, 0:53.**

**Third quarter**

- LAR – Davis Allen 13-yard pass from Matthew Stafford (Joshua Karty kick), 12:28. Rams 14–9. **Drive: 5 plays, 68 yards, 2:32.**

**Fourth quarter**

- No scoring plays.

**Top passers**

- HOU – C. J. Stroud – 19/27, 188 yards, INT
- LAR – Matthew Stafford – 21/29, 245 yards, TD

**Top rushers**

- HOU – Nick Chubb – 13 rushes, 60 yards
- LAR – Kyren Williams – 18 rushes, 66 yards, TD

**Top receivers**

- HOU – Jayden Higgins – 2 receptions, 32 yards
- LAR – Puka Nacua – 10 receptions, 130 yards

With the loss due an underwhelming performance by the Texans offense, Houston fell to 0–1.

==== Week 2: vs. Tampa Bay Buccaneers ====
Week 2: Tampa Bay Buccaneers at Houston Texans – Game summary

Quarter	1	2	3	4	Total
**Buccaneers**	7	7	0	6	**20**
Texans	10	0	0	9	**19**

at NRG Stadium, Houston, Texas

- Date: September 15
- Game time: 6:00 p.m. CDT
- Game weather: None (retractable roof closed)
- Game attendance: 71,580
- Referee: Shawn Hochuli
- TV announcers (ABC): Joe Buck, Troy Aikman, Lisa Salters and Laura Rutledge
- Recap, Game Book

Game information

**First quarter**

- HOU – Nico Collins 29-yard pass from C. J. Stroud (Ka'imi Fairbairn kick), 11:58. Texans 7–0. **Drive: 6 plays, 64 yards, 3:07.**
- TB – Ryan Miller 20-yard pass from Baker Mayfield (Chase McLaughlin kick), 7:12. Tied 7–7. **Drive: 9 plays, 65 yards, 4:41.**
- HOU – Ka'imi Fairbairn 35-yard field goal, 3:25. Texans 10–7. **Drive: 7 plays, 49 yards, 3:47.**

**Second quarter**

- TB – Emeka Egbuka 15-yard pass from Baker Mayfield (Chase McLaughlin kick), 9:41. Buccaneers 14–10. **Drive: 14 plays, 77 yards, 8:44.**

**Third quarter**

- No scoring plays

**Fourth quarter**

- HOU – Ka'imi Fairbairn 53-yard field goal, 5:22. Buccaneers 14–13. **Drive: 4 plays, 0 yards, 0:54.**
- HOU – Nick Chubb 25-yard run (pass failed), 2:10. Texans 19–14. **Drive: 2 plays, 26 yards, 0:50.**
- TB – Rachaad White 2-yard run (pass failed), 0:06. Buccaneers 20–19. **Drive: 11 plays, 80 yards, 2:04.**

**Top passers**

- TB – Baker Mayfield – 25/38, 215 yards, 2 TD
- HOU – C. J. Stroud – 13/24, 207 yards, TD

**Top rushers**

- TB – Bucky Irving – 17 rushes, 71 yards
- HOU – Nick Chubb – 12 rushes, 43 yards, TD

**Top receivers**

- TB – Mike Evans – 5 receptions, 56 yards
- HOU – Nico Collins – 3 receptions, 52 yards, TD

Despite taking a 19–14 lead with about two minutes remaining, Buccaneers quarterback Baker Mayfield led Tampa Bay on a game-winning touchdown drive to secure a 20–19 victory. With the loss, the Texans’ five-game winning streak against the Buccaneers was snapped, and they recorded their first home loss to Tampa Bay in franchise history.

==== Week 3: at Jacksonville Jaguars ====
Week 3: Houston Texans at Jacksonville Jaguars – Game summary

Quarter	1	2	3	4	Total
Texans	0	3	0	7	**10**
**Jaguars**	7	0	3	7	**17**

at EverBank Stadium, Jacksonville, Florida

- Date: September 21
- Game time: 1:00 p.m. EDT/12:00 p.m. CDT
- Game weather: Mostly sunny, 85 °F (29 °C)
- Game attendance: 58,161
- Referee: Alex Kemp
- TV announcers (CBS): Spero Dedes, Adam Archuleta and Aditi Kinkhabwala
- Recap, Game Book

Game information

**First quarter**

- JAX – Bhayshul Tuten 1-yard run (Cam Little kick), 2:06. Jaguars 7–0. **Drive: 9 plays, 58 yards, 4:34.**

**Second quarter**

- HOU – Ka'imi Fairbairn 27-yard field goal, 6:54. Jaguars 7–3. **Drive: 13 plays, 71 yards, 6:57.**

**Third quarter**

- JAX – Cam Little 39-yard field goal, 6:23. Jaguars 10–3. **Drive: 13 plays, 59 yards, 8:37.**

**Fourth quarter**

- HOU – Nico Collins 50-yard pass from C. J. Stroud (Ka'imi Fairbairn kick), 9:17. Tied 10–10. **Drive: 1 play, 50 yards, 0:08.**
- JAX – Travis Etienne 10-yard run (Cam Little kick), 1:48. Jaguars 17–10. **Drive: 7 plays, 83 yards, 1:59.**

**Top passers**

- HOU – C. J. Stroud – 25/38, 204 yards, TD, 2 INT
- JAX – Trevor Lawrence – 20/40, 222 yards, INT

**Top rushers**

- HOU – Nick Chubb – 9 rushes, 38 yards
- JAX – Travis Etienne – 16 rushes, 56 yards, TD

**Top receivers**

- HOU – Nico Collins – 8 receptions, 104 yards, TD
- JAX – Brenton Strange – 6 receptions, 61 yards

The loss ended the Texans' seven-game road winning streak against the Jaguars, marking their first road loss to Jacksonville since the 2017 season.

==== Week 4: vs. Tennessee Titans ====
Week 4: Tennessee Titans at Houston Texans – Game summary

Quarter	1	2	3	4	Total
Titans	0	0	0	0	**0**
**Texans**	3	3	0	20	**26**

at NRG Stadium, Houston, Texas

- Date: September 28
- Game time: 12:00 p.m. CDT
- Game weather: None (retractable roof closed)
- Game attendance: 70,398
- Referee: Brad Rogers
- TV announcers (CBS): Beth Mowins, Ross Tucker and Amanda Balionis
- Recap, Game Book

Game information

**First quarter**

- HOU – Ka'imi Fairbairn 47-yard field goal, 4:49. Texans 3–0. **Drive: 11 plays, 40 yards, 6:52.**

**Second quarter**

- HOU – Ka'imi Fairbairn 43-yard field goal, 13:28. Texans 6–0. **Drive: 11 plays, 60 yards, 4:37.**

**Third quarter**

- No scoring plays

**Fourth quarter**

- HOU – Woody Marks 12-yard pass from C. J. Stroud (pass failed), 14:55. Texans 12–0. **Drive: 13 plays, 82 yards, 7:51.**
- HOU – Jayden Higgins 24-yard pass from C. J. Stroud (Ka'imi Fairbairn kick), 9:26. Texans 19–0. **Drive: 6 plays, 44 yards, 3:12.**
- HOU – Woody Marks 18-yard run (Ka'imi Fairbairn kick), 4:51. Texans 26–0. **Drive: 4 plays, 31 yards, 1:57.**

**Top passers**

- TEN – Cam Ward – 10/26, 108 yards, INT
- HOU – C. J. Stroud – 22/28, 233 yards, 2 TD

**Top rushers**

- TEN – Tony Pollard – 14 rushes, 64 yards
- HOU – Woody Marks – 17 rushes, 69 yards, TD

**Top receivers**

- TEN – Elic Ayomanor – 2 receptions, 44 yards
- HOU – Nico Collins – 4 receptions, 79 yards

This was the first shutout win the Texans had since 2010. Coincidentally, that was also a home game against the Titans.

==== Week 5: at Baltimore Ravens ====
Week 5: Houston Texans at Baltimore Ravens – Game summary

Quarter	1	2	3	4	Total
**Texans**	7	17	10	10	**44**
Ravens	3	0	7	0	**10**

at M&T Bank Stadium, Baltimore, Maryland

- Date: October 5
- Game time: 1:00 p.m. EDT/12:00 p.m. CDT
- Game weather: Sunny, 78 °F (26 °C)
- Game attendance: 70,077
- Referee: Land Clark
- TV announcers (CBS): Ian Eagle, J. J. Watt and Evan Washburn
- Recap, Game Book

Game information

**First quarter**

- HOU – Xavier Hutchinson 5-yard pass from C. J. Stroud (Ka'imi Fairbairn kick), 9:24. Texans 7–0. **Drive: 10 plays, 67 yards, 5:36.**
- BAL – Tyler Loop 27-yard field goal, 1:58. Texans 7–3. **Drive: 12 plays, 66 yards, 7:26.**

**Second quarter**

- HOU – Ka'imi Fairbairn 50-yard field goal, 11:18. Texans 10–3. **Drive: 10 plays, 37 yards, 5:40.**
- HOU – Nico Collins 10-yard pass from C. J. Stroud (Ka'imi Fairbairn kick), 5:36. Texans 17–3. **Drive: 6 plays, 41 yards, 3:46.**
- HOU – Xavier Hutchinson 10-yard pass from C. J. Stroud (Ka'imi Fairbairn kick), 0:28. Texans 24–3. **Drive: 8 plays, 77 yards, 3:32.**

**Third quarter**

- HOU – Nick Chubb 27-yard run (Ka'imi Fairbairn kick), 11:33. Texans 31–3. **Drive: 3 plays, 38 yards, 1:16.**
- HOU – Ka'imi Fairbairn 57-yard field goal, 5:53. Texans 34–3. **Drive: 7 plays, 32 yards, 3:31.**
- BAL – Derrick Henry 1-yard run (Tyler Loop kick), 2:41. Texans 34–10. **Drive: 5 plays, 71 yards, 3:12.**

**Fourth quarter**

- HOU – Jaylin Noel 4-yard pass from C. J. Stroud (Ka'imi Fairbairn kick), 13:48. Texans 41–10. **Drive: 7 plays, 65 yards, 3:53.**
- HOU – Ka'imi Fairbairn 34-yard field goal, 10:30. Texans 44–10. **Drive: 4 plays, 5 yards, 1:40.**

**Top passers**

- HOU – C. J. Stroud – 23/27, 244 yards, 4 TD
- BAL – Cooper Rush – 14/20, 179 yards, 3 INT

**Top rushers**

- HOU – Nick Chubb – 11 rushes, 61 yards, TD
- BAL – Derrick Henry – 15 rushes, 33 yards, TD

**Top receivers**

- HOU – Christian Kirk – 4 receptions, 64 yards
- BAL – Zay Flowers – 5 receptions, 72 yards

Houston delivered a dominant performance with a 44–10 blowout victory over the Baltimore Ravens, thoroughly outperforming them in all phases of the game. Quarterback C.J. Stroud led the Texans on scoring drives in all eight offensive possessions while he was on the field. The game marked the first time Stroud led the Texans to an offensive touchdown against the Ravens, after failing to do so in the team's previous three matchups against Baltimore.

The victory was Houston’s first over Baltimore since the 2014 season, snapping a six-game losing streak against the Ravens, and also marked the franchise’s first-ever road win in Baltimore. The 34-point margin tied a franchise record for the largest road win in team history, equaling their 41–7 victory over the Tennessee Titans in 2011. Additionally, the 44 points scored set a new franchise record for the most points in a road game, surpassing the previous mark of 41, which had been reached three times.

With the win, Houston improved to 2–3 and headed into their bye week.

==== Week 7: at Seattle Seahawks ====
Week 7: Houston Texans at Seattle Seahawks – Game summary

Quarter	1	2	3	4	Total
Texans	0	6	6	7	**19**
**Seahawks**	14	0	13	0	**27**

at Lumen Field, Seattle, Washington

- Date: October 20
- Game time: 9:00 p.m. CDT/7:00 p.m. PDT
- Game weather: Cloudy, 56 °F (13 °C)
- Game attendance: 68,632
- Referee: Carl Cheffers
- TV announcers (ESPN): Chris Fowler, Dan Orlovsky, Louis Riddick, Katie George and Peter Schrager
- Recap, Game Book

Game information

**First quarter**

- SEA – Zach Charbonnet 1-yard run (Jason Myers kick), 7:28. Seahawks 7–0. **Drive: 5 plays, 44 yards, 2:38.**
- SEA – Jaxon Smith-Njigba 11-yard pass from Sam Darnold (Jason Myers kick), 0:00. Seahawks 14–0. **Drive: 10 plays, 80 yards, 5:08.**

**Second quarter**

- HOU – Ka'imi Fairbairn 36-yard field goal, 2:18. Seahawks 14–3. **Drive: 10 plays, 60 yards, 4:44.**
- HOU – Ka'imi Fairbairn 46-yard field goal, 0:00. Seahawks 14–6. **Drive: 3 plays, 29 yards, 0:13.**

**Third quarter**

- SEA – Jason Myers 26-yard field goal, 10:34. Seahawks 17–6. **Drive: 8 plays, 31 yards, 3:28.**
- HOU – Will Anderson Jr. 0-yard fumble recovery (pass failed), 7:24. Seahawks 17–12.
- SEA – Jason Myers 47-yard field goal, 5:15. Seahawks 20–12. **Drive: 5 plays, 33 yards, 2:09.**
- SEA – Zach Charbonnet 2-yard run (Jason Myers kick), 0:54. Seahawks 27–12. **Drive: 5 plays, 39 yards, 2:17.**

**Fourth quarter**

- HOU – Woody Marks 4-yard pass from C. J. Stroud (Ka'imi Fairbairn kick), 2:04. Seahawks 27–19. **Drive: 8 plays, 50 yards, 2:30.**

**Top passers**

- HOU – C. J. Stroud – 23/49, 229 yards, TD, INT
- SEA – Sam Darnold – 17/31, 213 yards, TD, INT

**Top rushers**

- HOU – C. J. Stroud – 2 rushes, 25 yards
- SEA – Kenneth Walker III – 17 rushes, 66 yards

**Top receivers**

- HOU – Dalton Schultz – 9 receptions, 98 yards
- SEA – Jaxon Smith-Njigba – 8 receptions, 123 yards, TD

With the loss, the Texans fell to 2–4 and 0–2 against the NFC West.

==== Week 8: vs. San Francisco 49ers ====
Week 8: San Francisco 49ers at Houston Texans – Game summary

Quarter	1	2	3	4	Total
49ers	0	7	8	0	**15**
**Texans**	3	13	7	3	**26**

at NRG Stadium, Houston, Texas

- Date: October 26
- Game time: 12:00 p.m. CDT
- Game weather: None (retractable roof closed)
- Game attendance: 70,581
- Referee: Alan Eck
- TV announcers (Fox): Kevin Kugler, Daryl Johnston and Allison Williams
- Recap, Game Book

Game information

**First quarter**

- HOU – Ka'imi Fairbairn 33-yard field goal, 5:21. Texans 3–0. **Drive: 16 plays, 57 yards, 9:39.**

**Second quarter**

- HOU – Ka'imi Fairbairn 34-yard field goal, 14:57. Texans 6–0. **Drive: 9 plays, 71 yards, 3:40.**
- HOU – Jayden Higgins 12-yard pass from C. J. Stroud (Ka'imi Fairbairn kick), 7:32. Texans 13–0. **Drive: 10 plays, 82 yards, 5:53.**
- HOU – Ka'imi Fairbairn 37-yard field goal, 0:58. Texans 16–0. **Drive: 11 plays, 62 yards, 4:54.**
- SF – George Kittle 17-yard pass from Mac Jones (Eddy Pineiro kick), 0:25. Texans 16–7. **Drive: 4 plays, 35 yards, 0:33.**

**Third quarter**

- HOU – Xavier Hutchinson 30-yard pass from C. J. Stroud (Ka'imi Fairbairn kick), 7:29. Texans 23–7. **Drive: 12 plays, 94 yards, 6:07.**
- SF – Jake Tonges 2-yard pass from Mac Jones (Mac Jones–Demarcus Robinson pass), 0:28. Texans 23–15. **Drive: 12 plays, 76 yards, 7:01.**

**Fourth quarter**

- HOU – Ka'imi Fairbairn 30-yard field goal, 9:41. Texans 26–15. **Drive: 10 plays, 58 yards, 5:47.**

**Top passers**

- SF – Mac Jones – 19/32, 193 yards, 2 TD, INT
- HOU – C. J. Stroud – 30/39, 318 yards, 2 TD, INT

**Top rushers**

- SF – Christian McCaffrey – 8 rushes, 25 yards
- HOU – Woody Marks – 11 rushes, 62 yards

**Top receivers**

- SF – Jauan Jennings – 4 receptions, 45 yards
- HOU – Xavier Hutchinson – 5 receptions, 69 yards, TD

The Texans faced off against the 49ers, whose head coach DeMeco Ryans served in a coaching position from 2017 to 2022. This was Jon Weeks's first game against the team he had formerly played for.

The Texans upset the 49ers, 26–15, for the first win against them since 2009, and improved to 3–4 on the season.

==== Week 9: vs. Denver Broncos ====
Week 9: Denver Broncos at Houston Texans – Game summary

Quarter	1	2	3	4	Total
**Broncos**	0	7	0	11	**18**
Texans	3	9	3	0	**15**

at NRG Stadium, Houston, Texas

- Date: November 2
- Game time: 12:00 p.m. CST
- Game weather: None (retractable roof closed)
- Game attendance: 70,471
- Referee: Ron Torbert
- TV announcers (Fox): Kevin Kugler, Daryl Johnston and Allison Williams
- Recap, Game Book

Game information

**First quarter**

- HOU – Ka'imi Fairbairn 23-yard field goal, 0:05. Texans 3–0. **Drive: 8 plays, 54 yards, 4:22.**

**Second quarter**

- HOU – Ka'imi Fairbairn 41-yard field goal, 7:11. Texans 6–0. **Drive: 10 plays, 28 yards, 5:25.**
- DEN – Courtland Sutton 30-yard pass from Bo Nix (Wil Lutz kick), 4:52. Broncos 7–6. **Drive: 7 plays, 70 yards, 2:19.**
- HOU – Ka'imi Fairbairn 38-yard field goal, 1:52. Texans 9–7. **Drive: 9 plays, 53 yards, 3:00.**
- HOU – Ka'imi Fairbairn 40-yard field goal, 0:00. Texans 12–7. **Drive: 4 plays, 9 yards, 0:39.**

**Third quarter**

- HOU – Ka'imi Fairbairn 41-yard field goal, 9:18. Texans 15–7. **Drive: 6 plays, 24 yards, 2:51.**

**Fourth quarter**

- DEN – RJ Harvey 27-yard pass from Bo Nix (Bo Nix–Troy Franklin pass), 12:28. Tied 15–15. **Drive: 8 plays, 61 yards, 3:51.**
- DEN – Wil Lutz 34-yard field goal, 0:00. Broncos 18–15. **Drive: 6 plays, 48 yards, 0:50.**

**Top passers**

- DEN – Bo Nix – 17/36, 170 yards, 2 TD, INT
- HOU – Davis Mills – 17/30, 137 yards

**Top rushers**

- DEN – J. K. Dobbins – 15 rushes, 61 yards
- HOU – Nick Chubb – 11 rushes, 34 yards

**Top receivers**

- DEN – RJ Harvey – 4 receptions, 48 yards, TD
- HOU – Dalton Schultz – 6 receptions, 77 yards

Despite building a 15–7 lead, the Texans' offense struggled against the Broncos' defense, resulting in only field goals scored. With the loss, Houston fell to 3–5.

==== Week 10: vs. Jacksonville Jaguars ====
Week 10: Jacksonville Jaguars at Houston Texans – Game summary

Quarter	1	2	3	4	Total
Jaguars	10	10	9	0	**29**
**Texans**	0	10	0	26	**36**

at NRG Stadium, Houston, Texas

- Date: November 9
- Game time: 12:00 p.m. CST
- Game weather: None (retractable roof closed)
- Game attendance: 70,531
- Referee: Alex Moore
- TV announcers (CBS): Ian Eagle, J. J. Watt and Evan Washburn
- Recap, Game Book

Game information

**First quarter**

- JAX – Cam Little 32-yard field goal, 11:04. Jaguars 3–0. **Drive: 7 plays, 26 yards, 2:58.**
- JAX – Parker Washington 7-yard pass from Trevor Lawrence (Cam Little kick), 8:17. Jaguars 10–0. **Drive: 5 plays, 19 yards, 2:40.**

**Second quarter**

- JAX – Parker Washington 73-yard punt return (Cam Little kick), 11:40. Jaguars 17–0.
- HOU – Matthew Wright 23-yard field goal, 8:05. Jaguars 17–3. **Drive: 8 plays, 61 yards, 3:35.**
- JAX – Cam Little 53-yard field goal, 4:02. Jaguars 20–3. **Drive: 7 plays, 40 yards, 4:03.**
- HOU – Woody Marks 1-yard run (Matthew Wright kick), 1:19. Jaguars 20–10. **Drive: 5 plays, 65 yards, 2:43.**

**Third quarter**

- JAX – Cam Little 33-yard field goal, 10:17. Jaguars 23–10. **Drive: 9 plays, 59 yards, 4:43.**
- JAX – Travis Etienne 6-yard run (pass failed), 1:33. Jaguars 29–10. **Drive: 11 plays, 58 yards, 5:52.**

**Fourth quarter**

- HOU – Jayden Higgins 12-yard pass from Davis Mills (Nico Collins-Davis Mills pass), 12:16. Jaguars 29–18. **Drive: 13 plays, 65 yards, 4:17.**
- HOU – Dalton Schultz 7-yard pass from Davis Mills (pass failed), 7:29. Jaguars 29–24. **Drive: 6 plays, 51 yards, 2:35.**
- HOU – Davis Mills 14-yard run (run failed), 0:31. Texans 30–29. **Drive: 14 plays, 93 yards, 5:39.**
- HOU – Sheldon Rankins 32-yard fumble return, 0:00. Texans 36–29.

**Top passers**

- JAX – Trevor Lawrence – 13/23, 158 yards, TD, INT
- HOU – Davis Mills – 27/45, 292 yards, 2 TD, INT

**Top rushers**

- JAX – Travis Etienne – 16 rushes, 58 yards, TD
- HOU – Woody Marks – 14 rushes, 63 yards, TD

**Top receivers**

- JAX – Jakobi Meyers – 3 receptions, 41 yards
- HOU – Nico Collins – 7 receptions, 136 yards

The Jaguars started off strong, jumping out to a 17–0 lead by capitalizing on Texans mistakes and extending their lead to 29–10 at the start of the fourth quarter. However, Davis Mills caught fire, throwing two touchdown passes in the final period and scrambling 14 yards for the go-ahead score with 31 seconds remaining. Meanwhile, the Jaguars went three and out on two consecutive drives. Jacksonville got the ball back with 30 seconds left to try to win the game, but Jaguars quarterback Trevor Lawrence was sacked as the Texans completed their comeback victory.

The 19-point comeback was the second-largest in Texans franchise history, behind only their 21-point comeback against the San Diego Chargers during the 2013 season.

==== Week 11: at Tennessee Titans ====
Week 11: Houston Texans at Tennessee Titans – Game summary

Quarter	1	2	3	4	Total
**Texans**	0	0	10	6	**16**
Titans	3	0	3	7	**13**

at Nissan Stadium, Nashville, Tennessee

- Date: November 16
- Game time: 12:00 p.m. CST
- Game weather: Sunny, 64 °F (18 °C)
- Game attendance: 55,999
- Referee: Shawn Hochuli
- TV announcers (Fox): Chris Myers, Mark Schlereth and Jen Hale
- Recap, Game Book

Game information

**First quarter**

- TEN – Joey Slye 56-yard field goal, 0:50. Titans 3–0. **Drive: 13 plays, 50 yards, 7:30.**

**Second quarter**

- No scoring plays

**Third quarter**

- TEN – Joey Slye 47-yard field goal, 10:45. Titans 6–0. **Drive: 8 plays, 37 yards, 4:15.**
- HOU – Nico Collins 3-yard pass from Davis Mills (Matthew Wright kick), 7:21. Texans 7–6. **Drive: 7 plays, 65 yards, 3:24.**
- HOU – Matthew Wright 41-yard field goal, 1:32. Texans 10–6. **Drive: 10 plays, 63 yards, 4:22.**

**Fourth quarter**

- HOU – Matthew Wright 43-yard field goal, 11:59. Texans 13–6. **Drive: 4 plays, 9 yards, 1:31.**
- TEN – Van Jefferson 4-yard pass from Cam Ward (Joey Slye kick), 1:35. Tied 13–13. **Drive: 11 plays, 95 yards, 3:22.**
- HOU – Matthew Wright 35-yard field goal, 0:00. Texans 16–13. **Drive: 9 plays, 48 yards, 1:35.**

**Top passers**

- HOU – Davis Mills – 26/41, 274 yards, TD
- TEN – Cam Ward – 24/37, 194 yards, TD

**Top rushers**

- HOU – Woody Marks – 18 rushes, 44 yards
- TEN – Cam Ward – 3 rushes, 33 yards

**Top receivers**

- HOU – Nico Collins – 9 receptions, 92 yards, TD
- TEN – Chig Okonkwo – 3 receptions, 56 yards

With their fifth win in Nashville since 2021, the Texans extended their win streak against Tennessee to three straight and improved to 5–5.

==== Week 12: vs. Buffalo Bills ====
Week 12: Buffalo Bills at Houston Texans – Game summary

Quarter	1	2	3	4	Total
Bills	6	10	0	3	**19**
**Texans**	3	17	3	0	**23**

at NRG Stadium, Houston, Texas

- Date: November 20
- Game time: 7:15 p.m. CST
- Game weather: None (retractable roof closed)
- Game attendance: 70,451
- Referee: Adrian Hill
- TV announcers (KRIV/Prime Video): Al Michaels, Kirk Herbstreit and Kaylee Hartung
- Recap, Game Book

Game information

**First quarter**

- BUF – James Cook 45-yard run (kick failed), 9:11. Bills 6–0. **Drive: 10 plays, 81 yards, 4:44.**
- HOU – Ka'imi Fairbairn 24-yard field goal, 4:32. Bills 6–3. **Drive: 10 plays, 54 yards, 4:39.**

**Second quarter**

- BUF – Matt Prater 44-yard field goal, 9:35. Bills 9–3. **Drive: 13 plays, 69 yards, 7:03.**
- HOU – Christian Kirk 2-yard pass from Davis Mills (Ka'imi Fairbairn kick), 3:47. Texans 10–9. **Drive: 12 plays, 77 yards, 5:48.**
- HOU – Ka'imi Fairbairn 43-yard field goal, 1:56. Texans 13–9. **Drive: 4 plays, 5 yards, 1:30.**
- BUF – Ray Davis 97-yard kickoff return (Matt Prater kick), 1:43. Bills 16–13.
- HOU – Jayden Higgins 8-yard pass from Davis Mills (Ka'imi Fairbairn kick), 0:05. Texans 20–16. **Drive: 6 plays, 75 yards, 1:38.**

**Third quarter**

- HOU – Ka'imi Fairbairn 26-yard field goal, 0:17. Texans 23–16. **Drive: 7 plays, 14 yards, 3:52.**

**Fourth quarter**

- BUF – Matt Prater 38-yard field goal, 5:44. Texans 23–19. **Drive: 7 plays, 42 yards, 3:25.**

**Top passers**

- BUF – Josh Allen – 24/34, 253 yards, 2 INT
- HOU – Davis Mills – 16/30, 153 yards, 2 TD

**Top rushers**

- BUF – James Cook – 17 rushes, 116 yards, TD
- HOU – Woody Marks – 16 rushes, 74 yards

**Top receivers**

- BUF – Khalil Shakir – 8 receptions, 110 yards
- HOU – Nico Collins – 3 receptions, 55 yards

The Texans’ defense swarmed the Bills and quarterback Josh Allen, sacking him eight times as Houston held on for their 6th straight home win against the Bills since 2012.

The eight sacks tied a franchise record for most in a single game.

==== Week 13: at Indianapolis Colts ====
Week 13: Houston Texans at Indianapolis Colts – Game summary

Quarter	1	2	3	4	Total
**Texans**	3	7	3	7	**20**
Colts	0	6	7	3	**16**

at Lucas Oil Stadium, Indianapolis, Indiana

- Date: November 30
- Game time: 1:00 p.m. EST/12:00 p.m. CST
- Game weather: None (retractable roof closed)
- Game attendance: 65,977
- Referee: Clay Martin
- TV announcers (CBS): Ian Eagle, J. J. Watt and Evan Washburn
- Recap, Game Book

Game information

**First quarter**

- HOU – Ka'imi Fairbairn 23-yard field goal, 7:55. Texans 3–0. **Drive: 13 plays, 64 yards, 6:12.**

**Second quarter**

- IND – Alec Pierce 19-yard pass from Daniel Jones (kick failed), 8:41. Colts 6–3. **Drive: 3 plays, 42 yards, 1:24.**
- HOU – Nick Chubb 4-yard run (Ka'imi Fairbairn kick), 5:08. Texans 10–6. **Drive: 8 plays, 67 yards, 3:33.**

**Third quarter**

- HOU – Ka'imi Fairbairn 43-yard field goal, 6:47. Texans 13–6. **Drive: 14 plays, 48 yards, 8:13.**
- IND – Tyler Warren 12-yard pass from Daniel Jones (Michael Badgley kick), 2:51. Tied 13–13. **Drive: 9 plays, 79 yards, 3:56.**

**Fourth quarter**

- HOU – Nico Collins 7-yard run (Ka'imi Fairbairn kick), 12:38. Texans 20–13. **Drive: 12 plays, 65 yards, 5:13.**
- IND – Michael Badgley 42-yard field goal, 8:40. Texans 20–16. **Drive: 8 plays, 41 yards, 3:58.**

**Top passers**

- HOU – C. J. Stroud – 22/35, 276 yards, INT
- IND – Daniel Jones – 14/27, 201 yards, 2 TD

**Top rushers**

- HOU – Woody Marks – 19 rushes, 64 yards
- IND – Jonathan Taylor – 21 rushes, 85 yards

**Top receivers**

- HOU – Nico Collins – 5 receptions, 98 yards
- IND – Alec Pierce – 4 receptions, 78 yards, TD

With their 4th straight win over the Colts, the Texans improved to 7–5 and handed the Colts their first home loss of the season.

The Texans also move to 3–0 when their former Pro Bowl defensive end J. J. Watt is the color commentator.

==== Week 14: at Kansas City Chiefs ====
Week 14: Houston Texans at Kansas City Chiefs – Game summary

Quarter	1	2	3	4	Total
**Texans**	3	7	0	10	**20**
Chiefs	0	0	10	0	**10**

at Arrowhead Stadium, Kansas City, Missouri

- Date: December 7
- Game time: 7:20 p.m. CST
- Game weather: Fair, 27 °F (−3 °C)
- Game attendance: 73,611
- Referee: Alan Eck
- TV announcers (NBC): Mike Tirico, Cris Collinsworth and Melissa Stark
- Recap, Game Book

Game information

**First quarter**

- HOU – Ka'imi Fairbairn 35-yard field goal, 4:18. Texans 3–0. **Drive: 5 plays, 51 yards, 2:27.**

**Second quarter**

- HOU – Woody Marks 9-yard pass from C. J. Stroud (Ka'imi Fairbairn kick), 9:24. Texans 10–0. **Drive: 10 plays, 90 yards, 5:30.**

**Third quarter**

- KC – Kareem Hunt 2-yard run (Harrison Butker kick), 9:52. Texans 10–7. **Drive: 8 plays, 56 yards, 4:08.**
- KC – Harrison Butker 36-yard field goal, 1:50. Tied 10–10. **Drive: 7 plays, 30 yards, 2:45.**

**Fourth quarter**

- HOU – Dare Ogunbowale 5-yard run (Ka'imi Fairbairn kick), 6:56. Texans 17–10. **Drive: 6 plays, 31 yards, 3:22.**
- HOU – Ka'imi Fairbairn 28-yard field goal, 0:30. Texans 20–10. **Drive: 7 plays, 16 yards, 3:02.**

**Top passers**

- HOU – C. J. Stroud – 15/31, 203 yards, TD
- KC – Patrick Mahomes – 14/33, 160 yards, 3 INT

**Top rushers**

- HOU – Woody Marks – 26 rushes, 68 yards
- KC – Patrick Mahomes – 7 rushes, 59 yards

**Top receivers**

- HOU – Nico Collins – 4 receptions, 121 yards
- KC – Xavier Worthy – 3 receptions, 55 yards

In a rematch of the Divisional Round from the previous season, the Texans avenged their playoff loss by defeating the Chiefs on the road, forcing three interceptions of quarterback Patrick Mahomes. In a pivotal sequence, the Chiefs faced fourth-and-1 at their own 31-yard line and elected to go for it, but Mahomes’ pass fell incomplete with just over ten minutes remaining. Six plays later, Dare Ogunbowale rushed for a five-yard touchdown, giving Houston a lead it did not relinquish. With their first win over Kansas City since 2019, Houston snapped a six game losing streak against the Chiefs and improved to 8–5.

==== Week 15: vs. Arizona Cardinals ====
Week 15: Arizona Cardinals at Houston Texans – Game summary

Quarter	1	2	3	4	Total
Cardinals	0	7	7	6	**20**
**Texans**	17	6	7	10	**40**

at NRG Stadium, Houston, Texas

- Date: December 14
- Game time: 12:00 p.m. CST
- Game weather: None (retractable roof closed)
- Game attendance: 71,086
- Referee: Clete Blakeman
- TV announcers (Fox): Chris Myers, Mark Schlereth and Jen Hale
- Recap, Game Book

Game information

**First quarter**

- HOU – Nico Collins 57-yard pass from C. J. Stroud (Kaʻimi Fairbairn kick), 14:11. Texans 7–0. **Drive: 2 plays, 59 yards, 0:49.**
- HOU – Kaʻimi Fairbairn 30-yard field goal, 12:00. Texans 10–0. **Drive: 5 plays, 10 yards, 2:03.**
- HOU – Woody Marks 1-yard fumble return (Kaʻimi Fairbairn kick), 6:12. Texans 17–0.

**Second quarter**

- ARI – Trey McBride 2-yard pass from Jacoby Brissett (Chad Ryland kick), 13:41. Texans 17–7. **Drive: 13 plays, 71 yards, 7:31.**
- HOU – Kaʻimi Fairbairn 55-yard field goal, 9:01. Texans 20–7. **Drive: 7 plays, 28 yards, 4:40.**
- HOU – Kaʻimi Fairbairn 22-yard field goal, 1:44. Texans 23–7. **Drive: 12 plays, 76 yards, 5:44.**

**Third quarter**

- HOU – Dalton Schultz 4-yard pass from C. J. Stroud (Kaʻimi Fairbairn kick), 4:35. Texans 30–7. **Drive: 8 plays, 80 yards, 4:20.**
- ARI – Trey McBride 20-yard pass from Jacoby Brissett (Chad Ryland kick), 0:33. Texans 30–14. **Drive: 8 plays, 71 yards, 4:02.**

**Fourth quarter**

- HOU – Kaʻimi Fairbairn 33-yard field goal, 13:34. Texans 33–14. **Drive: 5 plays, 11 yards, 1:59.**
- ARI – Michael Wilson 11-yard pass from Jacoby Brissett (pass failed), 11:01. Texans 33–20. **Drive: 8 plays, 73 yards, 2:33.**
- HOU – Nico Collins 4-yard pass from C. J. Stroud (Kaʻimi Fairbairn kick), 3:09. Texans 40–20. **Drive: 10 plays, 55 yards, 4:26.**

**Top passers**

- ARI – Jacoby Brissett – 27/40, 249 yards, 3 TD, INT
- HOU – C. J. Stroud – 22/29, 260 yards, 3 TD

**Top rushers**

- ARI – Michael Carter – 14 rushes, 56 yards
- HOU – Jawhar Jordan – 15 rushes, 101 yards

**Top receivers**

- ARI – Trey McBride – 12 receptions, 134 yards, 2 TD
- HOU – Nico Collins – 3 receptions, 85 yards, 2 TD

With the win, the Texans improved to 9–5 and finished 2–2 against the NFC West as well as 2–3 against the NFC. This marked the second time in franchise history that the Texans had 3 consecutive winning seasons (2014 through 2016).

==== Week 16: vs. Las Vegas Raiders ====
Week 16: Las Vegas Raiders at Houston Texans – Game summary

Quarter	1	2	3	4	Total
Raiders	0	7	7	7	**21**
**Texans**	7	6	3	7	**23**

at NRG Stadium, Houston, Texas

- Date: December 21
- Game time: 3:25 p.m. CST
- Game weather: None (retractable roof closed)
- Game attendance: 71,160
- Referee: Scott Novak
- TV announcers (CBS): Andrew Catalon, Charles Davis, Jason McCourty and AJ Ross
- Recap, Game Book

Game information

**First quarter**

- HOU – Derek Stingley Jr. 31-yard interception return (Ka'imi Fairbairn kick), 10:43. Texans 7–0.

**Second quarter**

- LV – Brock Bowers 7-yard pass from Geno Smith (Daniel Carlson kick), 12:25. Tied 7–7. **Drive: 7 plays, 61 yards, 3:40.**
- HOU – Ka'imi Fairbairn 55-yard field goal, 9:12. Texans 10–7. **Drive: 7 plays, 35 yards, 3:13.**
- HOU – Ka'imi Fairbairn 50-yard field goal, 0:50. Texans 13–7. **Drive: 11 plays, 57 yards, 4:29.**

**Third quarter**

- LV – Ashton Jeanty 60-yard pass from Geno Smith (Daniel Carlson kick), 9:44. Raiders 14–13. **Drive: 6 plays, 85 yards, 3:28.**
- HOU – Ka'imi Fairbairn 49-yard field goal, 3:08. Texans 16–14. **Drive: 5 plays, 22 yards, 2:53.**

**Fourth quarter**

- HOU – Dalton Schultz 1-yard pass from C. J. Stroud (Ka'imi Fairbairn kick), 7:41. Texans 23–14. **Drive: 10 plays, 88 yards, 5:54.**
- LV – Ashton Jeanty 51-yard run (Daniel Carlson kick), 5:24. Texans 23–21. **Drive: 5 plays, 65 yards, 2:17.**

**Top passers**

- LV – Geno Smith – 16/23, 201 yards, 2 TD, INT
- HOU – C. J. Stroud – 23/35, 187 yards, TD

**Top rushers**

- LV – Ashton Jeanty – 24 rushes, 128 yards, TD
- HOU – Jawhar Jordan – 15 rushes, 53 yards

**Top receivers**

- LV – Ashton Jeanty – 1 reception, 60 yards, TD
- HOU – Nico Collins – 4 receptions, 59 yards

With the win, the Texans improved to 2–1 against the AFC West, and matched their win total from the last two seasons at 10–5.

==== Week 17: at Los Angeles Chargers ====
Week 17: Houston Texans at Los Angeles Chargers – Game summary

Quarter	1	2	3	4	Total
**Texans**	14	0	3	3	**20**
Chargers	0	3	7	6	**16**

at SoFi Stadium, Inglewood, California

- Date: December 27
- Game time: 3:30 p.m. CST/1:30 p.m. PST
- Game weather: Sunny, 61 °F (16 °C) (fixed roof)
- Game attendance: 73,066
- Referee: Craig Wrolstad
- TV announcers (KHOU/NFLN): Rich Eisen, Kurt Warner, Jamie Erdahl and Megan Olivi
- Recap, Game Book

Game information

**First quarter**

- HOU – Jayden Higgins 75-yard pass from C. J. Stroud (Ka'imi Fairbairn kick), 13:20. Texans 7–0. **Drive: 3 plays, 84 yards, 1:40.**
- HOU – Jaylin Noel 43-yard pass from C. J. Stroud (Ka'imi Fairbairn kick), 9:17. Texans 14–0. **Drive: 4 plays, 72 yards, 2:02.**

**Second quarter**

- LAC – Cameron Dicker 27-yard field goal, 6:10. Texans 14–3. **Drive: 6 plays, 28 yards, 2:38.**

**Third quarter**

- HOU – Ka'imi Fairbairn 41-yard field goal, 6:04. Texans 17–3. **Drive: 7 plays, 24 yards, 3:34.**
- LAC – Oronde Gadsden II 1-yard pass from Justin Herbert (Cameron Dicker kick), 0:13. Texans 17–10. **Drive: 11 plays, 64 yards, 5:51.**

**Fourth quarter**

- HOU – Ka'imi Fairbairn 44-yard field goal, 6:29. Texans 20–10. **Drive: 7 plays, 29 yards, 4:07.**
- LAC – Omarion Hampton 5-yard run (kick failed), 3:37. Texans 20–16. **Drive: 7 plays, 75 yards, 2:52.**

**Top passers**

- HOU – C. J. Stroud – 16/28, 244 yards, 2 TD, 2 INT
- LAC – Justin Herbert – 21/32, 236 yards, TD, INT

**Top rushers**

- HOU – Woody Marks – 19 rushes, 71 yards
- LAC – Justin Herbert – 6 rushes, 37 yards

**Top receivers**

- HOU – Jayden Higgins – 2 receptions, 88 yards, TD
- LAC – Quentin Johnston – 5 receptions, 98 yards

With the win, the Texans clinched their third straight playoff berth after starting the season 0–3. Houston became the fifth team since 1990 to reach the playoffs after an 0–3 start, and the first franchise to accomplish the feat twice, having previously done so in 2018. This also marked the first time in franchise history Houston qualified for the playoffs in three straight years.

==== Week 18: vs. Indianapolis Colts ====
Week 18: Indianapolis Colts at Houston Texans – Game summary

Quarter	1	2	3	4	Total
Colts	10	7	10	3	**30**
**Texans**	6	17	3	12	**38**

at NRG Stadium, Houston, Texas

- Date: January 4
- Game time: 12:00 p.m. CST
- Game weather: None (retractable roof closed)
- Game attendance: 71,133
- Referee: Land Clark
- TV announcers (CBS): Ian Eagle, J.J. Watt and Evan Washburn
- Recap, Game Book

Game information

**First quarter**

- HOU – Ka'imi Fairbairn 51-yard field goal, 12:05. Texans 3–0. **Drive: 8 plays, 37 yards, 2:55.**
- IND – Alec Pierce 66-yard pass from Riley Leonard (Blake Grupe kick), 10:36. Colts 7–3. **Drive: 3 plays, 69 yards, 1:29.**
- HOU – Ka'imi Fairbairn 48-yard field goal, 6:36. Colts 7–6. **Drive: 7 plays, 31 yards, 4:00.**
- IND – Blake Grupe 50-yard field goal, 0:34. Colts 10–6. **Drive: 11 plays, 44 yards, 6:02.**

**Second quarter**

- HOU – Jayden Higgins 11-yard pass from C. J. Stroud (Ka'imi Fairbairn kick), 9:34. Texans 13–10. **Drive: 11 plays, 82 yards, 6:00.**
- HOU – C. J. Stroud 2-yard run (Ka'imi Fairbairn kick), 8:32. Texans 20–10. **Drive: 1 play, 2 yards, 0:06.**
- IND – Alec Pierce 8-yard pass from Riley Leonard (Blake Grupe kick), 1:25. Texans 20–17. **Drive: 8 plays, 92 yards, 2:34.**
- HOU – Ka'imi Fairbairn 29-yard field goal, 0:00. Texans 23–17. **Drive: 9 plays, 59 yards, 1:25.**

**Third quarter**

- IND – Riley Leonard 1-yard run (Blake Grupe kick), 13:05. Colts 24–23. **Drive: 4 plays, 65 yards, 1:55.**
- HOU – Ka'imi Fairbairn 43-yard field goal, 6:53. Texans 26–24. **Drive: 8 plays, 47 yards, 3:26.**
- IND – Blake Grupe 39-yard field goal, 1:42. Colts 27–26. **Drive: 13 plays, 44 yards, 5:11.**

**Fourth quarter**

- HOU – Ka'imi Fairbairn 44-yard field goal, 11:15. Texans 29–27. **Drive: 4 plays, 8 yards, 1:13.**
- IND – Blake Grupe 22-yard field goal, 2:39. Colts 30–29. **Drive: 14 plays, 61 yards, 8:36.**
- HOU – Ka'imi Fairbairn 43-yard field goal, 0:12. Texans 32–30. **Drive: 7 plays, 40 yards, 2:27.**
- HOU – Tommy Togiai 17-yard fumble recovery, 0:00. Texans 38–30.

**Top passers**

- IND – Riley Leonard – 21/34, 270 yards, 2 TD, INT
- HOU – C. J. Stroud – 14/23, 169 yards, TD

**Top rushers**

- IND – DJ Giddens – 8 rushes, 30 yards
- HOU – British Brooks – 13 rushes, 63 yards

**Top receivers**

- IND – Alec Pierce – 4 receptions, 132 yards, 2 TD
- HOU – Xavier Hutchinson – 5 receptions, 84 yards

Despite winning, the Texans’ win was offset by the Jaguars’ win over the Titans, which clinched Jacksonville the AFC South and secured the Texans a Wild Card berth for the first time in franchise history. Later that day, when the Steelers defeated the Ravens, the Texans were scheduled to face Pittsburgh in the Wild Card Round.

Houston’s defense set franchise records by limiting opponents to 17.3 points and 277.2 yards per game during the season.

This win also marked the third time the Texans swept the Colts in franchise history, and the first time they did so in consecutive years, as they swept them in 2016 and 2024.

The Texans also moved to 4–0 when J.J. Watt was the color commentator.

=== Standings ===
==== Division ====
AFC South
	W	L	T	PCT	DIV	CONF	PF	PA	STK
^{(3)} Jacksonville Jaguars	13	4	0	.765	5–1	10–2	474	336	W8
^{(5)} Houston Texans	12	5	0	.706	5–1	10–2	404	295	W9
Indianapolis Colts	8	9	0	.471	2–4	6–6	466	412	L7
Tennessee Titans	3	14	0	.176	0–6	2–10	284	478	L2

==== Conference ====
AFC
Seed	Team	Division	W	L	T	PCT	DIV	CONF	SOS	SOV	STK
**Division leaders**
1 (Note: Denver finished ahead of New England based on common games (Denver 6–0 to New England 5–1 against: Cincinnati, Las Vegas, NY Giants, NY Jets and Tennessee).)	Denver Broncos	West	14	3	0	.824	5–1	9–3	.422	.378	W2
2	New England Patriots	East	14	3	0	.824	5–1	9–3	.391	.370	W3
3	Jacksonville Jaguars	South	13	4	0	.765	5–1	10–2	.478	.425	W8
4	Pittsburgh Steelers	North	10	7	0	.588	4–2	8–4	.503	.453	W1
**Wild cards**
5 (Note: Houston finished ahead of Buffalo based on head-to-head victory.)	Houston Texans	South	12	5	0	.706	5–1	10–2	.522	.441	W9
6	Buffalo Bills	East	12	5	0	.706	4–2	9–3	.471	.412	W1
7	Los Angeles Chargers	West	11	6	0	.647	5–1	8–4	.469	.425	L2
**Did not qualify for the postseason**
8 (Note: Indianapolis finished ahead of Baltimore based on conference record (Indianapolis 6–6 to Baltimore 5–7).)	Indianapolis Colts	South	8	9	0	.471	2–4	6–6	.540	.382	L7
9	Baltimore Ravens	North	8	9	0	.471	3–3	5–7	.507	.408	L1
10	Miami Dolphins	East	7	10	0	.412	3–3	3–9	.488	.378	L1
11 (Note: Cincinnati finished ahead of Kansas City based on conference record (Cincinnati 5–7 to Kansas City 3–9).)	Cincinnati Bengals	North	6	11	0	.353	3–3	5–7	.521	.451	L1
12	Kansas City Chiefs	West	6	11	0	.353	1–5	3–9	.514	.363	L6
13	Cleveland Browns	North	5	12	0	.294	2–4	4–8	.486	.418	W2
14 (Note: Las Vegas finished ahead of NY Jets and Tennessee based on conference record (Las Vegas 3–9 to NY Jets 2–10 and Tennessee 2–10).)	Las Vegas Raiders	West	3	14	0	.176	1–5	3–9	.538	.451	W1
15 (Note: NY Jets finished ahead of Tennessee based on strength of victory (NY Jets .373 to Tennessee .275).)	New York Jets	East	3	14	0	.176	0–6	2–10	.552	.373	L5
16	Tennessee Titans	South	3	14	0	.176	0–6	2–10	.574	.275	L2
**Tiebreakers** (Note: When breaking ties for three or more teams under the NFL's rules, they are first broken within divisions, then comparing only the highest ranked remaining team from each division.)

== Postseason ==
=== Schedule ===
Round	Date	Opponent (seed)	Result	Record	Venue	Recap
Wild Card	January 12	at Pittsburgh Steelers (4)	W 30–6	1–0	Acrisure Stadium	Recap
Divisional	January 18	at New England Patriots (2)	L 16–28	1–1	Gillette Stadium	Recap

=== Game summaries ===
==== AFC Wild Card Playoffs: at (4) Pittsburgh Steelers ====
AFC Wild Card Playoffs: (5) Houston Texans at (4) Pittsburgh Steelers – Game Summary

Quarter	1	2	3	4	Total
Texans	0	7	0	23	30
Steelers	3	3	0	0	6

at Acrisure Stadium, Pittsburgh, Pennsylvania

- Date: January 12, 2026
- Game time: 8:15 p.m. EST/7:15 p.m. CST
- Game weather: Clear, 33 °F (1 °C)
- Referee: Craig Wrolstad
- TV announcers (ESPN/ABC): Joe Buck, Troy Aikman, Lisa Salters, and Laura Rutledge
- Recap, Game Book

Game information

First quarter

- PIT – Chris Boswell 32-yard field goal, 6:02. Steelers 3–0. Drive: 7 plays, 58 yards, 2:52.

Second quarter

- HOU – Christian Kirk 6-yard pass from C. J. Stroud (Ka'imi Fairbairn kick), 8:28. Texans 7–3. Drive: 14 plays, 92 yards, 7:01.
- PIT – Chris Boswell 36-yard field goal, 1:57. Texans 7–6. Drive: 8 plays, 4 yards, 4:17.

Third quarter

- No scoring plays

Fourth quarter

- HOU – Ka'imi Fairbairn 51-yard field goal, 13:07. Texans 10–6. Drive: 7 plays, 45 yards, 3:22.
- HOU – Sheldon Rankins 33-yard fumble recovery (Ka'imi Fairbairn kick), 11:23. Texans 17–6.
- HOU – Woody Marks 13-yard run (Ka'imi Fairbairn kick), 3:38. Texans 24–6. Drive: 11 plays, 87 yards, 5:51.
- HOU – Calen Bullock 51-yard interception return (kick failed), 2:39. Texans 30–6.

Top passers

- HOU – C. J. Stroud – 21/32, 250 yards, TD, INT
- PIT – Aaron Rodgers – 17/33, 146 yards, INT

Top rushers

- HOU – Woody Marks – 19 rushes, 112 yards, TD
- PIT – Jaylen Warren – 12 rushes, 43 yards

Top receivers

- HOU – Christian Kirk – 8 receptions, 144 yards, TD
- PIT – DK Metcalf – 2 receptions, 42 yards

The Texans vs. Steelers matchup marked three firsts for Houston. This was the first time they played the Steelers in the playoffs, their first Wild Card Game that was not played on Saturday during the 3:30 PM (CT) slot, and their first Wild Card Game played as the away team. Despite both the Texans and Steelers competing in the AFC, this marked the first time the two teams had played each other more than once in a span of less than three NFL seasons, regular and postseason combined.

The game started as a low scoring affair with both offenses struggling. C. J. Stroud lost two fumbles despite not losing one during the entire regular season, and throwing an interception in the red zone in the beginning of the third quarter, but the Steelers only got 3 points from those turnovers. In the 4th quarter, the Texans dominated as their defense scoring two touchdowns, one of those being Calen Bullock intercepting Aaron Rodgers and returning it for a 51-yard touchdown, which was Rodgers' last pass of the game. With this win, the Texans won a playoff game on the road for the first time in franchise history, and beat the Steelers on the road for the first time since 2002 (the first-ever matchup between these teams). Houston was also the first team since the 1991 Giants to defeat the Steelers in Pittsburgh on Monday night, officially ending a 23-game win streak for the Steelers.

==== AFC Divisional Playoffs: at (2) New England Patriots ====
AFC Divisional Playoffs: (5) Houston Texans at (2) New England Patriots – Game Summary

Quarter	1	2	3	4	Total
Texans	3	7	6	0	16
Patriots	7	14	0	7	28

at Gillette Stadium, Foxborough, Massachusetts

- Date: January 18, 2026
- Game time: 3:05 p.m. EST/2:05 p.m. CST
- Game weather: Snow, 35 °F (2 °C)
- Game attendance: 64,628
- Referee: Shawn Smith
- TV announcers (ESPN/ABC): Joe Buck, Troy Aikman, Lisa Salters, and Laura Rutledge
- Recap, Game Book

Game information

First quarter

- NE – Demario Douglas 28-yard pass from Drake Maye (Andres Borregales kick), 9:35. Patriots 7–0. Drive: 6 plays, 66 yards, 3:18.
- HOU – Ka'imi Fairbairn 25-yard field goal, 5:26. Patriots 7–3. Drive: 10 plays, 65 yards, 4:09.

Second quarter

- HOU – Christian Kirk 10-yard pass from C. J. Stroud (Ka'imi Fairbairn kick), 12:51. Texans 10–7. Drive: 6 plays, 27 yards, 3:02.
- NE – Marcus Jones 26-yard interception return (Andres Borregales kick), 10:31. Patriots 14–10.
- NE – Stefon Diggs 7-yard pass from Drake Maye (Andres Borregales kick), 3:12. Patriots 21–10. Drive: 5 plays, 56 yards, 2:48.

Third quarter

- HOU – Ka'imi Fairbairn 25-yard field goal, 9:45. Patriots 21–13. Drive: 11 plays, 58 yards, 5:15.
- HOU – Ka'imi Fairbairn 51-yard field goal, 1:32. Patriots 21–16. Drive: 6 plays, 26 yards, 1:56.

Fourth quarter

- NE – Kayshon Boutte 32-yard pass from Drake Maye (Andres Borregales kick), 12:58. Patriots 28–16. Drive: 6 plays, 71 yards, 3:34.

Top passers

- HOU – C. J. Stroud – 20/47, 212 yards, TD, 4 INT
- NE – Drake Maye – 16/27, 179 yards, 3 TD, INT

Top rushers

- HOU – Woody Marks – 14 rushes, 17 yards
- NE – Rhamondre Stevenson – 16 rushes, 70 yards

Top receivers

- HOU – Jayden Higgins – 6 receptions, 59 yards
- NE – Kayshon Boutte – 3 receptions, 75 yards, TD

With the loss, the Texans' season ended with their seventh Divisional Round loss; they also fell to 0–3 against the Patriots in the playoffs. C.J. Stroud also threw four interceptions, with one of them being returned for a New England touchdown.
