= Kamari Lassiter =

American football player (born 2003)

No. 3 – Houston Texans
- Position: Cornerback
- Roster status: Active

Personal information
- Born: January 23, 2003 (age 23); Savannah, Georgia, U.S.
- Listed height: 6 ft 0 in (1.83 m)
- Listed weight: 180 lb (82 kg)

Career information
- High school: American Christian Academy (Tuscaloosa, Alabama)
- College: Georgia (2021–2023)
- NFL draft: 2024: 2nd round, 42nd overall pick

Career history
- Houston Texans (2024–present)

Awards and highlights
- Pro Bowl (2025); 2× CFP national champion (2021, 2022); Second-team All-SEC (2023)

Career NFL statistics as of Week 7, 2026
- Tackles: 194
- Sacks: 1.0
- Fumble recoveries: 1
- Pass deflections: 32
- Interceptions: 7
- Stats at Pro Football Reference

Kamari Quincey Lassiter (born January 23, 2003) is an American professional football cornerback for the Houston Texans of the National Football League (NFL). He played college football for the Georgia Bulldogs, winning two national championships before being selected by the Texans in the second round of the 2024 NFL draft.

== Early life ==
Lassiter was born in Savannah, Georgia on January 23, 2003. At the age of three, he began to play football. Lassiter attended American Christian Academy in Tuscaloosa, Alabama. He was a multi-sport athlete, playing football, basketball, baseball, and running track. During his high school career, Lassiter recorded 210 tackles, ten interceptions, and four forced fumbles. In addition, Lassiter played wide receiver totaling 2,488 yards, and 35 touchdowns. A four-star recruit, Lassiter committed to play college football at the University of Georgia over the likes of Auburn, Clemson, and Georgia Tech.

== College career ==
As a true freshman in 2021, Lassiter played in all 15 games, in which he tallied 11 tackles and one interception. Entering the 2022 season, Lassiter's role was expected to increase with the departure of Derion Kendrick. In the season opener against Oregon, Lassiter made his first career start totaling three tackles. Against Tennessee, Lassiter recorded a career-high five tackles and a pass break up. He finished the season with a total of 38 tackles, recording three in a 65–7 victory against TCU in the 2023 College Football Playoff National Championship Game.

== Professional career ==
Pre-draft measurables
Height	Weight	Arm length	Hand span	Wingspan	40-yard dash	10-yard split	20-yard split	20-yard shuttle	Three-cone drill
5 ft 11 1/2 in (1.82 m)	186 lb (84 kg)	30 7/8 in (0.78 m)	8 7/8 in (0.23 m)	6 ft 1 3/4 in (1.87 m)	4.65 s	1.58 s	2.69 s	4.08 s	6.62 s
All values from NFL Combine/Pro Day

The Houston Texans selected Lassiter in the second round (42nd overall) in the 2024 NFL draft. Lassiter was the sixth cornerback drafted in 2024. On May 10, 2024, the Houston Texans signed Lassiter to a four—year, $9.01 million contract that includes $7.09 million guaranteed and an initial signing bonus of $3.37 million.

== NFL career statistics ==
Legend
	Led the league
**Bold**	Career high

=== Regular season ===
Year	Team	Games		Tackles						Interceptions						Fumbles			
Year	Team	GP	GS	Cmb	Solo	Ast	TFL	Sck	Sfty	PD	Int	Yds	Avg	Lng	TD	FF	FR	Yds	TD
2024	HOU	14	14	58	42	16	4	0.0	**1**	10	3	**9**	**3.0**	**9**	0	0	0	0	0
2025	HOU	16	16	**91**	**62**	**29**	**7**	0.0	0	**17**	**4**	0	0.0	0	0	0	0	0	0
Career		30	30	149	104	45	11	0.0	1	27	7	9	1.3	9	0	0	0	0	0

=== Postseason ===
Year	Team	Games		Tackles					Interceptions						Fumbles			
Year	Team	GP	GS	Cmb	Solo	Ast	TFL	Sck	PD	Int	Yds	Avg	Lng	TD	FF	FR	Yds	TD
2024	HOU	2	2	5	2	3	**1**	0.0	2	**1**	0	0.0	0	0	0	0	0	0
2025	HOU	2	2	**11**	**7**	**4**	**1**	0.0	**4**	0	0	0.0	0	0	0	0	0	0
Career		4	4	16	9	7	2	0.0	6	1	0	0.0	0	0	0	0	0	0
