= Kayshon Boutte =

American football player (born 2002)

No. 14 – Houston Texans
- Position: Wide receiver
- Roster status: Active

Personal information
- Born: May 7, 2002 (age 24); New Iberia, Louisiana, U.S.
- Listed height: 5 ft 11 in (1.80 m)
- Listed weight: 203 lb (92 kg)

Career information
- High school: Westgate (New Iberia)
- College: LSU (2020–2022)
- NFL draft: 2023: 6th round, 187th overall pick

Career history
- New England Patriots (2023–2025); Houston Texans (2026–present)

Career NFL statistics as of Week 11, 2026
- Receptions: 99
- Receiving yards: 1,518
- Receiving average: 15.3
- Receiving touchdowns: 12
- Stats at Pro Football Reference

Kayshon Boutte (/ˈbuːti/ BOO-tee; born May 7, 2002) is an American professional football wide receiver for the Houston Texans of the National Football League (NFL). He played college football for the LSU Tigers and was selected by the New England Patriots in the sixth round of the 2023 NFL draft.

== Early life ==
Boutte attended Westgate High School in New Iberia, Louisiana. As a senior, he had 47 receptions for 1,005 yards with 15 touchdowns and rushed for 874 yards on 71 carries and 12 touchdowns. Boutte played in the 2020 Under Armour All-American Game. Coming out of high school, Boutte was a 5-star recruit and was ranked the nation's #2 wide receiver. He committed to Louisiana State University (LSU) to play college football.

== College career ==
With Ja'Marr Chase opting out of the season to prepare for the 2021 NFL draft, Boutte entered his true freshman season in 2020 as one of LSU's top receivers. He became the number-one receiver after Terrace Marshall Jr. also opted out.

In the 2020 game against Ole Miss, he set a Southeastern Conference record for receiving yards in a game with 14 receptions for 308 yards, adding three receiving touchdowns as well.

== Professional career ==
Pre-draft measurables
Height	Weight	Arm length	Hand span	Wingspan	40-yard dash	10-yard split	20-yard split	20-yard shuttle	Three-cone drill	Vertical jump	Broad jump
5 ft 11 1/4 in (1.81 m)	195 lb (88 kg)	31 3/8 in (0.80 m)	9 1/2 in (0.24 m)	6 ft 4 7/8 in (1.95 m)	4.50 s	1.58 s	2.60 s	4.25 s	7.14 s	29.0 in (0.74 m)	9 ft 10 in (3.00 m)
All values from NFL Combine/Pro Day

=== New England Patriots ===
Boutte was selected by the New England Patriots in the sixth round, 187th overall, in the 2023 NFL draft. He made his NFL debut in the Patriots' regular season opener against the Eagles. He appeared in five games as a rookie and finished with two receptions for 19 yards.

Boutte changed his jersey number from 80 to 9 before the 2024 season. In Week 6 of the 2024 season against the Houston Texans, Boutte scored his first NFL touchdown on a 40-yard pass from Drake Maye towards the end of the first half. The Patriots would still go on to lose the game 41–21. In the 2024 season, he finished with 43 receptions for 589 yards and three touchdowns.

In the 2025 season, Boutte finished with 33 receptions for 551 yards and six touchdowns. In the Divisional Round against the Houston Texans, Boutte recorded three receptions for 75 yards and one touchdown in the 28–16 win. In Super Bowl LX, he had one reception for 21 yards in the 29–13 loss to the Seattle Seahawks.

=== Houston Texans ===
On August 24, 2026, Boutte was traded to the Houston Texans in exchange for safety Jaylen Reed and a 2028 seventh-round draft pick.

== NFL career statistics ==
Legend
**Bold**	Career high

Year	Team	Games		Receiving				
Year	Team	GP	GS	Rec	Yds	Avg	Lng	TD
2023	NE	5	0	2	19	9.5	11	0
2024	NE	**15**	**13**	**43**	**589**	13.7	**48**	3
2025	NE	14	10	33	551	**16.7**	39	**6**
2026	HOU	10	4	21	359	17.1	63	3
Career		44	27	99	1,518	15.3	63	12

== Personal life ==
Boutte and his girlfriend have a son who was born on September 22, 2022.

On January 25, 2024, Boutte was issued a warrant of arrest in connection to an online gambling investigation. Boutte was alleged to have placed 8,900 wagers while underage, including at least six on LSU Tigers football games. On July 16, 2024, all gambling charges against Boutte were dropped.

In a 2026 piece for The Players' Tribune, Boutte admitted to being a problem gambler during some of his time at LSU.
