= 2025 All-Pro Team =

Media-voted list of the best NFL players in 2025

The 2025 All-Pro teams were named by the Associated Press (AP), Pro Football Writers of America (PFWA), and The Sporting News (TSN) for performance in the 2025 NFL season. Any player selected to any of the teams can be described as an "All-Pro." The AP team, with first-team and second-team selections, was chosen by a national panel of fifty NFL writers and broadcasters. The Sporting News All-Pro team was voted on by NFL players and executives. The PFWA All-NFL team is selected by its more than 300 national members who are accredited media members covering the NFL.

For the 2025 vote, the AP added a new "all purpose" position. Similar to the "flex" position voted on from 2016 to 2019, the "all-purpose" selection can be a running back, fullback, wide receiver, or tight end.

== Teams ==
Offense
Position	First team	Second team
Quarterback	Matthew Stafford, Los Angeles Rams (AP, PFWA, TSN)	Drake Maye, New England (AP-2)
Running back	Bijan Robinson, Atlanta (AP); James Cook, Buffalo (PFWA); Christian McCaffrey, San Francisco (PFWA, TSN); Jonathan Taylor, Indianapolis (TSN)	James Cook, Buffalo (AP-2)
Fullback	Kyle Juszczyk, San Francisco (AP)	Patrick Ricard, Baltimore (AP-2)
All-purpose	Christian McCaffrey, San Francisco (AP)	Bijan Robinson, Atlanta (AP-2)
Wide receiver	Puka Nacua, Los Angeles Rams (AP, PFWA, TSN); Jaxon Smith-Njigba, Seattle (AP, PFWA, TSN); Ja’Marr Chase, Cincinnati (AP)	George Pickens, Dallas (AP-2); Chris Olave, New Orleans (AP-2); Amon-Ra St. Brown, Detroit (AP-2)
Tight end	Trey McBride, Arizona (AP, PFWA, TSN)	Kyle Pitts, Atlanta (AP-2)
Left tackle	Garett Bolles, Denver (AP)	Trent Williams, San Francisco (AP-2)
Left guard	Joe Thuney, Chicago (AP)	Quenton Nelson, Indianapolis (AP-2)
Center	Creed Humphrey, Kansas City (AP, PFWA, TSN)	Aaron Brewer, Miami (AP-2)
Right guard	Quinn Meinerz, Denver (AP)	Chris Lindstrom, Atlanta (AP-2)
Right tackle	Penei Sewell, Detroit (AP)	Darnell Wright, Chicago (AP-2)
Tackle	Garett Bolles, Denver (PFWA); Penei Sewell, Detroit (PFWA, TSN); Trent Williams, San Francisco (TSN)	
Guard	Quinn Meinerz, Denver (PFWA); Joe Thuney, Chicago (PFWA, TSN); Quenton Nelson, Indianapolis (TSN)	

Special teams
Position	First team	Second team
Placekicker	Will Reichard, Minnesota (AP); Brandon Aubrey, Dallas (PFWA); Cameron Dicker, Los Angeles Chargers (TSN)	Brandon Aubrey, Dallas (AP-2)
Punter	Jordan Stout, Baltimore (AP, PFWA); Tress Way, Washington (TSN)	Michael Dickson, Seattle (AP-2)
Kickoff returner	Ray Davis, Buffalo (AP, PFWA, TSN)	KaVontae Turpin, Dallas (AP-2)
Punt returner	Chimere Dike, Tennessee (AP, PFWA); Marcus Jones, New England (TSN)	Marcus Jones, New England (AP-2)
Special teamer	Devon Key, Denver (AP, PFWA)	Del'Shawn Phillips, Los Angeles Chargers (AP-2)
Long snapper	Ross Matiscik, Jacksonville (AP)	Andrew DePaola, Minnesota (AP-2)

Defense
Position	First team	Second team
Edge rusher	Myles Garrett, Cleveland (AP); Micah Parsons, Green Bay (AP); Will Anderson Jr., Houston (AP)	Aidan Hutchinson, Detroit (AP-2); Danielle Hunter, Houston (AP-2); Brian Burns, New York Giants (AP-2)
Defensive end	Will Anderson Jr., Houston (PFWA, TSN); Myles Garrett, Cleveland (PFWA, TSN)	
Interior lineman/Defensive tackle	Jeffery Simmons, Tennessee (AP, PFWA, TSN); Zach Allen, Denver (AP); Leonard Williams, Seattle (PFWA); Quinnen Williams, Dallas (TSN)	Leonard Williams, Seattle (AP-2); Cameron Heyward, Pittsburgh (AP-2)
Linebacker	Jordyn Brooks, Miami (AP, TSN); Jack Campbell, Detroit (AP, PFWA, TSN)	Ernest Jones IV, Seattle (AP-2); Devin Lloyd, Jacksonville (AP-2)
Outside linebacker	Nik Bonitto, Denver (PFWA, TSN); Brian Burns, New York Giants (PFWA)	
Cornerback	Derek Stingley Jr., Houston (AP, PFWA); Quinyon Mitchell, Philadelphia (AP, PFWA); Patrick Surtain II, Denver (TSN); Jaycee Horn, Carolina (TSN)	Devon Witherspoon, Seattle (AP-2); Patrick Surtain II, Denver (AP-2)
Slot cornerback	Cooper DeJean, Philadelphia (AP)	Derwin James, Los Angeles Chargers (AP-2)
Safety	Kyle Hamilton, Baltimore (AP, PFWA, TSN); Kevin Byard, Chicago (AP, PFWA, TSN)	Jessie Bates, Atlanta (AP-2); Talanoa Hufanga, Denver (AP-2t); Xavier McKinney, Green Bay (AP-2t)

AP source:
PFWA source:
TSN source:

For this season's AP ballot, Los Angeles Rams wide receiver Puka Nacua, Seattle Seahawks wide receiver Jaxon Smith-Njigba, and Cleveland Browns edge rusher Myles Garrett were unanimous selections, receiving all 50 first-place votes at their respective positions.

== Key ==
- AP = Associated Press first-team All-Pro
- AP-2 = Associated Press second-team All-Pro
- AP-2t = Tied for second-team All-Pro in the AP vote
- PFWA = Pro Football Writers Association All-NFL
- TSN = The Sporting News All-Pro

== Number of AP selections per team ==
American Football Conference
Team	Selections
Baltimore Ravens	3
Buffalo Bills	2
Cincinnati Bengals	1
Cleveland Browns	1
Denver Broncos	6
Houston Texans	3
Indianapolis Colts	1
Jacksonville Jaguars	2
Kansas City Chiefs	1
Las Vegas Raiders	0
Los Angeles Chargers	2
Miami Dolphins	2
New England Patriots	2
New York Jets	0
Pittsburgh Steelers	1
Tennessee Titans	2

National Football Conference
Team	Selections
Arizona Cardinals	1
Atlanta Falcons	5 (Note: Including Bijan Robinson's dual selections at first-team running back and second-team all-purpose.)
Carolina Panthers	1
Chicago Bears	3
Dallas Cowboys	3
Detroit Lions	4
Green Bay Packers	2
Los Angeles Rams	2
Minnesota Vikings	2
New Orleans Saints	1
New York Giants	1
Philadelphia Eagles	2
San Francisco 49ers	3
Seattle Seahawks	5
Tampa Bay Buccaneers	0
Washington Commanders	0

== Position differences ==
PFWA and TSN do not separate the tackles and guards into more specific positions as the AP does, nor do they select an all-purpose player on offense. Additionally, PFWA and TSN formally select defensive ends as opposed to edge rushers, while PFWA selects outside linebackers separately from middle linebackers.
