= 2026 Pro Bowl Games =

National Football League all-star games

NFC	AFC
66	52
Head coach: Jerry Rice	Head coach: Steve Young
- Date: February 3, 2026
- Stadium: Moscone Center, San Francisco, California
- Offensive MVP: George Pickens (Dallas Cowboys)
- Defensive MVP: Antoine Winfield Jr. (Tampa Bay Buccaneers)

Ceremonies
- National anthem: Ebony Riley

TV in the United States
- Network: ESPN; Disney XD; ESPN Deportes; NFL+; ESPN DTC
- Announcers: Scott Van Pelt (play-by-play), Dan Orlovsky, Jason Kelce (color), Laura Rutledge, and Michelle Beisner-Buck (sideline reporters)

Radio in the United States
- Network: Westwood One
- Announcers: Ryan Radtke, (play-by-play), Kirk Morrison (analyst) and Amber Theoharis (sideline reporter)

The 2026 Pro Bowl Games was the National Football League (NFL)'s all-star game for the 2025 NFL season. This was the fourth and final year the event has consisted of a non-contact flag football game, and the first year it has been integrated into the Super Bowl's festivities instead of a standalone event. It took place in the week leading up to Super Bowl LX on Tuesday, February 3, 2026, at the Moscone Center in San Francisco, California, the site of this season's Super Bowl Experience. The NFC defended their win from the previous year's flag football game with a 66–52 win, extending their win streak to four straight, retaining their undefeated record since the format change, and allowing them to retake a 27–26 all-time lead over the AFC in Pro Bowl events.

This was the final edition of the Pro Bowl Games, as the NFL announced in August 2026 that they would be discontinued.

== Background ==
In October 2025, the NFL announced plans to integrate the Pro Bowl Games into the Super Bowl's festivities rather than continue to hold it as a standalone event. It will be designed as a more intimate, television-oriented event held inside a 4,000-seat ballroom at the Moscone Center in San Francisco, the site of this season's Super Bowl Experience. The league also intends to use it as a preview for flag football's Olympics debut at the 2028 Games in Los Angeles.

== Format ==
The format included a 7-on-7 flag football game held on February 3, 2026. The Skills Competition was not televised this year and did not count towards the points of the final score. Portions were shown on social media and other digital platforms. In the three prior years held that were worth points towards the final score.

== Rosters ==
The fan voting ran from November 27, 2025, to December, with the initial rosters announced on December 23, 2025. After quarterback Drake Maye and the New England Patriots advanced to Super Bowl LX, he was replaced by Shedeur Sanders; the Cleveland Browns rookie was reportedly selected because a number of other AFC quarterbacks were either injured or declined to participate, but it sparked outbursts from fans due to Sanders's subpar season that included a 3–4 record, a 56.6 completion percentage, a 7-10 interception ratio, and a 68.1 passer rating.

=== AFC ===
Offense
Position	Starter(s)	Reserve(s)	Alternate(s)
Quarterback	17 Josh Allen, Buffalo^{[b]}	10 Justin Herbert, LA Chargers^{[d]} 10 Drake Maye, New England^{[c]}	9 Joe Burrow, Cincinnati^{[a]} 16 Joe Flacco, Cincinnati^{[a]} 12 Shedeur Sanders, Cleveland^{[a]}
Running back	28 Jonathan Taylor, Indianapolis	28 De'Von Achane, Miami; 4 James Cook, Buffalo	
Fullback	42 Patrick Ricard, Baltimore		
Wide receiver	1 Ja'Marr Chase, Cincinnati; 12 Nico Collins, Houston	4 Zay Flowers, Baltimore^{[d]} 14 Courtland Sutton, Denver	5 Tee Higgins, Cincinnati^{[a]}
Tight end	89 Brock Bowers, Las Vegas^{[b]}	87 Travis Kelce, Kansas City^{[d]}	84 Tyler Warren, Indianapolis^{[a]} 86 Dalton Kincaid, Buffalo^{[a]}
Offensive tackle	72 Garett Bolles, Denver; 73 Dion Dawkins, Buffalo	76 Joe Alt, LA Chargers^{[b]}	
Offensive guard	77 Quinn Meinerz, Denver; 56 Quenton Nelson, Indianapolis	65 Trey Smith, Kansas City	
Center	52 Creed Humphrey, Kansas City	64 Tyler Linderbaum, Baltimore	

Defense
Position	Starter(s)	Reserve(s)	Alternate(s)
Defensive end	51 Will Anderson Jr., Houston; 95 Myles Garrett, Cleveland^{[d]}	98 Maxx Crosby, Las Vegas	
Defensive tackle	95 Chris Jones, Kansas City; 98 Jeffery Simmons, Tennessee	99 Zach Allen, Denver	
Outside linebacker	15 Nik Bonitto, Denver; 90 T. J. Watt, Pittsburgh^{[d]}	45 Tuli Tuipulotu, LA Chargers	0 Devin Lloyd, Jacksonville^{[a]}
Inside / middle linebacker	0 Roquan Smith, Baltimore	0 Azeez Al-Shaair, Houston	
Cornerback	24 Derek Stingley Jr., Houston; 2 Patrick Surtain II, Denver	0 Christian Gonzalez, New England^{[c]} 21 Denzel Ward, Cleveland	4 Kamari Lassiter, Houston^{[a]}
Free safety	5 Jalen Ramsey, Pittsburgh^{[d]}		2 Calen Bullock, Houston^{[a]}
Strong safety	14 Kyle Hamilton, Baltimore	3 Derwin James, LA Chargers	

Special Teams
Position	Starter	Alternate(s)
Long snapper	46 Ross Matiscik, Jacksonville	
Punter	11 Jordan Stout, Baltimore	
Placekicker	11 Cameron Dicker, LA Chargers	
Return specialist	17 Chimere Dike, Tennessee	
Special teams	15 Ben Skowronek, Pittsburgh	

bold player who participated in the game
italics signifies a rookie
(C) signifies the player has been selected as a captain
^{a} Replacement player selection due to an injury or vacancy
^{b} Injured Player; selected but did not participate
^{c} Selected but did not play because his team advanced to Super Bowl LX (see Pro Bowl "Player Selection" section)
^{d} Selected but chose not to participate

=== NFC ===
Offense
Position	Starter(s)	Reserve(s)	Alternate(s)
Quarterback	9 Matthew Stafford, LA Rams^{[d]}	14 Sam Darnold, Seattle^{[c]} 4 Dak Prescott, Dallas	16 Jared Goff, Detroit^{[a]} 1 Jalen Hurts, Philadelphia^{[a]}
Running back	0 Jahmyr Gibbs, Detroit	23 Christian McCaffrey, San Francisco; 7 Bijan Robinson, Atlanta	
Fullback	44 Kyle Juszczyk, San Francisco		
Wide receiver	12 Puka Nacua, LA Rams; 11 Jaxon Smith-Njigba, Seattle^{[c]}	3 George Pickens, Dallas; 14 Amon-Ra St. Brown, Detroit	88 CeeDee Lamb, Dallas^{[a]}
Tight end	85 Trey McBride, Arizona	85 George Kittle, San Francisco^{[b]}	87 Jake Ferguson, Dallas^{[a]}
Offensive tackle	58 Penei Sewell, Detroit; 78 Tristan Wirfs, Tampa Bay	71 Trent Williams, San Francisco	
Offensive guard	73 Tyler Smith, Dallas; 62 Joe Thuney, Chicago	63 Chris Lindstrom, Atlanta	
Center	52 Drew Dalman, Chicago	51 Cam Jurgens, Philadelphia	

Defense
Position	Starter(s)	Reserve(s)	Alternate(s)
Defensive end	97 Aidan Hutchinson, Detroit; 1 Micah Parsons, Green Bay^{[b]}	0 DeMarcus Lawrence, Seattle^{[c]}	
Defensive tackle	98 Jalen Carter, Philadelphia; 99 Leonard Williams, Seattle^{[c]}	92 Quinnen Williams, Dallas	
Outside linebacker	0 Brian Burns, NY Giants; 8 Jared Verse, LA Rams	0 Byron Young, LA Rams	
Inside / middle linebacker	46 Jack Campbell, Detroit	53 Zack Baun, Philadelphia	
Cornerback	8 Jaycee Horn, Carolina; 21 Devon Witherspoon, Seattle^{[c]}	33 Cooper DeJean, Philadelphia; 27 Quinyon Mitchell, Philadelphia^{[d]}	26 Nahshon Wright, Chicago^{[a]} 25 Keisean Nixon, Green Bay^{[a]}
Free safety	31 Kevin Byard III, Chicago	31 Antoine Winfield Jr., Tampa Bay	
Strong safety	3 Budda Baker, Arizona		

Special teams
Position	Starter(s)	Alternate(s)
Long snapper	46 Jon Weeks, San Francisco	
Punter	10 Tress Way, Washington	
Placekicker	17 Brandon Aubrey, Dallas	
Return specialist	22 Rashid Shaheed, Seattle^{[c]}	9 KaVontae Turpin, Dallas^{[a]}
Special teams	57 Luke Gifford, San Francisco	

bold player who participated in the game
italics signifies a rookie
C signifies the player has been selected as a captain
^{a} Replacement Player selection due to injury or vacancy
^{b} Injured Player; selected but did not participate
^{c} Selected but did not play because his team advanced to Super Bowl LX (see Pro Bowl "Player Selection" section)
^{d} Selected but chose not to participate

== Number of selections per team ==
American Football Conference
Team	Selections
Baltimore Ravens	6
Buffalo Bills	4
Cincinnati Bengals	4
Cleveland Browns	3
Denver Broncos	6
Houston Texans	6
Indianapolis Colts	2
Jacksonville Jaguars	2
Kansas City Chiefs	4
Los Angeles Chargers	5
Las Vegas Raiders	2
Miami Dolphins	1
New England Patriots	2
New York Jets	0
Pittsburgh Steelers	3
Tennessee Titans	2

National Football Conference
Team	Selections
Arizona Cardinals	2
Atlanta Falcons	2
Carolina Panthers	1
Chicago Bears	4
Dallas Cowboys	8
Detroit Lions	6
Green Bay Packers	2
Los Angeles Rams	4
Minnesota Vikings	0
New Orleans Saints	0
New York Giants	1
Philadelphia Eagles	6
San Francisco 49ers	6
Seattle Seahawks	6
Tampa Bay Buccaneers	2
Washington Commanders	1

== Broadcasting ==
ESPN will continue to produce the telecasts of the Pro Bowl Games. However, ABC will no longer simulcast the flag football game live due to the broadcast network's prior commitment to air its regular Tuesday night primetime lineup. However, ABC aired a one-hour Pro Bowl Games content special, Championship Chase: The Pro Bowl produced by NFL Films on Sunday, February 1, preceded by a special edition of NFL Live on ESPN. This special was narrated by Method Man and made available on ESPN digital platforms the next day.
