= TeRah Edwards =

American football player (born 2001)

No. 93 – Carolina Panthers
- Position: Defensive tackle
- Roster status: Active

Personal information
- Born: June 3, 2001 (age 25); Groveport, Ohio, U.S.
- Listed height: 6 ft 2 in (1.88 m)
- Listed weight: 305 lb (138 kg)

Career information
- High school: Groveport-Madison (Groveport, Ohio)
- College: Northwestern (2020–2021); Illinois (2022–2024)
- NFL draft: 2025: undrafted

Career history
- Los Angeles Chargers (2025)*; Carolina Panthers (2026–present)
- * Offseason or practice squad member only
- Stats at Pro Football Reference

TeRah Edwards (born June 3, 2001) is an American professional football defensive tackle for the Carolina Panthers of the National Football League (NFL). He played college football for the Northestern Wildcats and Illinois Fighting Illini and has also been a member of the Los Angeles Chargers.

== Early life ==
Edwards was born on June 3, 2001, in Groveport, Ohio. He attended Groveport Madison High School where he competed in football and wrestling. As a junior, Edwards was named first-team All-Ohio Capital Conference (OCC) and second-team all-district while posting 30 tackles, three tackles-for-loss (TFLs) and two sacks. He then was named first-team All-OCC, all-district, all-metro, and all-state the next year after recording 53 tackles, 7.5 TFLs and 4.5 sacks. He was the football team captain as a senior and also won two OCC championships in wrestling. A three-star recruit, he committed to play college football for the Northwestern Wildcats.

== College career ==
As a true freshman at Northwestern in 2020, Edwards made one tackle. He redshirted in 2021 after appearing in three games and recording one tackle. In 2022, Edwards transferred to the Illinois Fighting Illini. He was a backup and recorded 14 tackles and a sack during his first year with the Fighting Illini. The following year, Edwards appeared in 12 games while posting 13 tackles and a half-sack. He became the team's starting nose tackle as a senior in 2024. He recorded career-highs with 38 tackles, five TFLs and 2.5 sacks while being named honorable mention All-Big Ten Conference.

== Professional career ==
Pre-draft measurables
Height	Weight	Arm length	Hand span	Wingspan	40-yard dash	10-yard split	20-yard split	20-yard shuttle	Three-cone drill	Vertical jump	Broad jump	Bench press
6 ft 2 5/8 in (1.90 m)	321 lb (146 kg)	32 in (0.81 m)	9 1/4 in (0.23 m)	6 ft 3 in (1.91 m)	5.24 s	1.80 s	3.01 s	4.69 s	7.70 s	25.5 in (0.65 m)	8 ft 9 in (2.67 m)	29 reps
All values from Pro Day

=== Los Angeles Chargers ===
After going unselected in the 2025 NFL draft, Edwards signed with the Los Angeles Chargers as an undrafted free agent. He had an interception in preseason but was waived on August 26, 2025, at the final roster cuts, then re-signed to the practice squad the next day. After spending the season on the practice squad, he signed a reserve/future contract with the Chargers on January 13, 2026. In the 2026 preseason, Edwards recorded 10 tackles.

=== Carolina Panthers ===
On August 30, 2026, Edwards was traded to the Carolina Panthers in exchange for a sixth-round pick in the 2028 NFL draft.
