= 2024 All-Pro Team =

Media-voted list of the best NFL players in 2024

The 2024 All-Pro teams were named by the Associated Press (AP), Pro Football Writers of America (PFWA), and The Sporting News (TSN) for performance in the 2024 NFL season. Any player selected to any of the teams can be described as an "All-Pro." The AP team, with first-team and second-team selections, was chosen by a national panel of fifty NFL writers and broadcasters. The Sporting News All-Pro team was voted on by NFL players and executives. The PFWA All-NFL team is selected by its more than 300 national members who are accredited media members covering the NFL.

== Teams ==
Offense
Position	First team	Second team
Quarterback	Lamar Jackson, Baltimore (AP, PFWA, TSN)	Josh Allen, Buffalo (AP-2)
Running back	Saquon Barkley, Philadelphia (AP, PFWA, TSN); Derrick Henry, Baltimore (PFWA, TSN)	Derrick Henry, Baltimore (AP-2)
Fullback	Patrick Ricard, Baltimore (AP)	Kyle Juszczyk, San Francisco (AP-2)
Wide receiver	Ja'Marr Chase, Cincinnati (AP, PFWA, TSN); Justin Jefferson, Minnesota (AP, PFWA, TSN); Amon-Ra St. Brown, Detroit (AP)	Terry McLaurin, Washington (AP-2); CeeDee Lamb, Dallas (AP-2); A. J. Brown, Philadelphia (AP-2)
Tight end	Brock Bowers, Las Vegas (AP, PFWA, TSN)	George Kittle, San Francisco (AP-2)
Left tackle	Tristan Wirfs, Tampa Bay (AP)	Jordan Mailata, Philadelphia (AP-2)
Left guard	Joe Thuney, Kansas City (AP)	Quenton Nelson, Indianapolis (AP-2)
Center	Creed Humphrey, Kansas City (AP, PFWA, TSN)	Frank Ragnow, Detroit (AP-2)
Right guard	Quinn Meinerz, Denver (AP)	Chris Lindstrom, Atlanta (AP-2)
Right tackle	Penei Sewell, Detroit (AP)	Lane Johnson, Philadelphia (AP-2)
Tackle	Penei Sewell, Detroit (PFWA, TSN); Tristan Wirfs, Tampa Bay (PFWA); Lane Johnson, Philadelphia (TSN)	
Guard	Quinn Meinerz, Denver (PFWA); Joe Thuney, Kansas City (PFWA, TSN); Landon Dickerson, Philadelphia (TSN)	

Special teams
Position	First team	Second team
Kicker	Chris Boswell, Pittsburgh (AP, PFWA, TSN)	Brandon Aubrey, Dallas (AP-2)
Punter	Jack Fox, Detroit (AP, PFWA, TSN)	Logan Cooke, Jacksonville (AP-2)
Kick returner	KaVontae Turpin, Dallas (AP, PFWA, TSN)	Austin Ekeler, Washington (AP-2)
Punt returner	Marvin Mims Jr., Denver (AP, PFWA, TSN)	Kalif Raymond, Detroit (AP-2)
Special teamer	Brenden Schooler, New England (AP, PFWA)	J. T. Gray, New Orleans (AP-2)
Long snapper	Andrew DePaola, Minnesota (AP)	Ross Matiscik, Jacksonville (AP-2)

Defense
Position	First team	Second team
Edge rusher	Myles Garrett, Cleveland (AP); Trey Hendrickson, Cincinnati (AP)	T. J. Watt, Pittsburgh (AP-2); Nik Bonitto, Denver (AP-2t); Andrew Van Ginkel, Minnesota (AP-2t)
Defensive end	Myles Garrett, Cleveland (PFWA, TSN); Trey Hendrickson, Cincinnati (PFWA, TSN)	
Interior lineman/Defensive tackle	Cameron Heyward, Pittsburgh (AP, PFWA); Chris Jones, Kansas City (AP, PFWA, TSN); Dexter Lawrence, New York Giants (TSN)	Zach Allen, Denver (AP-2); Jalen Carter, Philadelphia (AP-2)
Linebacker	Zack Baun, Philadelphia (AP); Fred Warner, San Francisco (AP, PFWA, TSN); Roquan Smith, Baltimore (AP, TSN); T. J. Watt, Pittsburgh (TSN)	Frankie Luvu, Washington (AP-2); Bobby Wagner, Washington (AP-2); Zaire Franklin, Indianapolis (AP-2)
Outside linebacker	Nik Bonitto, Denver (PFWA); T. J. Watt, Pittsburgh (PFWA)	
Cornerback	Patrick Surtain II, Denver (AP, PFWA, TSN); Derek Stingley Jr., Houston (AP, PFWA, TSN)	Trent McDuffie, Kansas City (AP-2); Christian Gonzalez, New England (AP-2)
Slot cornerback	Marlon Humphrey, Baltimore (AP)	Derwin James, Los Angeles Chargers (AP-2)
Safety	Kerby Joseph, Detroit (AP, PFWA); Xavier McKinney, Green Bay (AP, PFWA, TSN); Brian Branch, Detroit (TSN-t); Kyle Hamilton, Baltimore (TSN-t)	Kyle Hamilton, Baltimore (AP-2); Budda Baker, Arizona (AP-2)

AP source:
PFWA source:
TSN source:

For this season's AP ballot, Cincinnati Bengals wide receiver Ja'Marr Chase and Minnesota Vikings wide receiver Justin Jefferson were unanimous selections, receiving all 50 first-place votes at wide receiver.

== Key ==
- AP = Associated Press first-team All-Pro
- AP-2 = Associated Press second-team All-Pro
- AP-2t = Tied for second-team All-Pro in the AP vote
- PFWA = Pro Football Writers Association All-NFL
- TSN = The Sporting News All-Pro
- TSN-t = Tied for All-Pro in the TSN vote

== Number of AP selections per team ==
American Football Conference
Team	Selections
Baltimore Ravens	6
Buffalo Bills	1
Cincinnati Bengals	2
Cleveland Browns	1
Denver Broncos	5
Houston Texans	1
Indianapolis Colts	2
Jacksonville Jaguars	2
Kansas City Chiefs	4
Las Vegas Raiders	1
Los Angeles Chargers	1
Miami Dolphins	0
New England Patriots	2
New York Jets	0
Pittsburgh Steelers	3
Tennessee Titans	0

National Football Conference
Team	Selections
Arizona Cardinals	1
Atlanta Falcons	1
Carolina Panthers	0
Chicago Bears	0
Dallas Cowboys	3
Detroit Lions	6
Green Bay Packers	1
Los Angeles Rams	0
Minnesota Vikings	3
New Orleans Saints	1
New York Giants	0
Philadelphia Eagles	6
San Francisco 49ers	3
Seattle Seahawks	0
Tampa Bay Buccaneers	1
Washington Commanders	4

== Position differences ==
PFWA and TSN do not separate the tackles and guards into more specific positions as the AP does. Additionally, PFWA and TSN formally select defensive ends as opposed to edge rushers, while PFWA selects outside linebackers separately from middle linebackers.
