= Will Anderson Jr. =

American football player (born 2001)

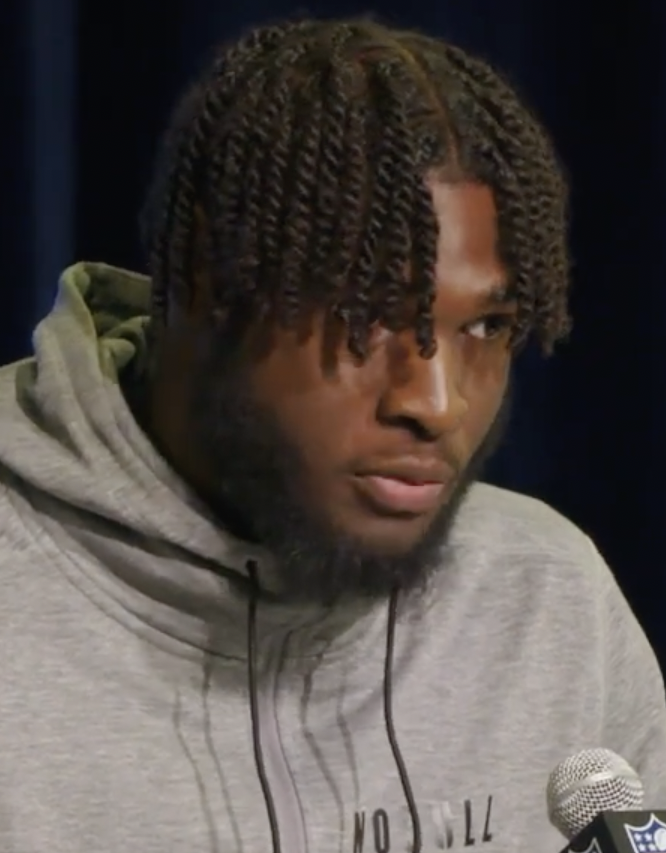
- Anderson Jr. at the 2023 NFL Combine

No. 51 – Houston Texans
- Position: Defensive end
- Roster status: Active

Personal information
- Born: September 2, 2001 (age 25); Hampton, Georgia, U.S.
- Listed height: 6 ft 4 in (1.93 m)
- Listed weight: 243 lb (110 kg)

Career information
- High school: Dutchtown (Hampton)
- College: Alabama (2020–2022)
- NFL draft: 2023: 1st round, 3rd overall pick

Career history
- Houston Texans (2023–present)

Awards and highlights
- NFL Defensive Rookie of the Year (2023); First-team All-Pro (2025); 2× Pro Bowl (2023, 2025); PFWA All-Rookie Team (2023); CFP national champion (2020); Lombardi Award (2022); 2× Bronko Nagurski Trophy (2021, 2022); Chuck Bednarik Award (2022); Lott Trophy (2022); Shaun Alexander Award (2020); 2× SEC Defensive Player of the Year (2021, 2022); 2× Unanimous All-American (2021, 2022); 2× First-team All-SEC (2021, 2022); Second-team All-SEC (2020)

Career NFL statistics as of Week 8, 2026
- Total tackles: 169
- Sacks: 37.5
- Forced fumbles: 5
- Fumble recoveries: 4
- Pass deflections: 7
- Defensive touchdowns: 1
- Stats at Pro Football Reference

William Anderson Jr. (born September 2, 2001) is an American professional football defensive end for the Houston Texans of the National Football League (NFL). He played college football for the Alabama Crimson Tide, where he won several awards, such as the Bronko Nagurski Trophy twice, and was a part of Alabama's national championship in 2020.

Anderson was selected by the Texans third overall in the 2023 NFL draft, who traded up to get him after selecting Ohio State quarterback C. J. Stroud with the previous pick. He won NFL Defensive Rookie of the Year in 2023.

== Early life ==
Anderson was born on September 2, 2001, in Hampton, Georgia. He attended Dutchtown High School, where he recorded 22 sacks with 15 tackles for loss as a senior in 2019. Anderson was named to The Atlanta Journal-Constitution's "Super 11" team and played in the 2020 All-American Bowl. Anderson committed to play college football for the Alabama Crimson Tide.

== College career ==
Anderson was named a starter at outside linebacker as a freshman in 2020. He was named second-team All-Southeastern Conference (SEC) after finishing with seven quarterback sacks and 10.5 tackles for loss as the Crimson Tide won the 2021 College Football Playoff National Championship. As a sophomore in 2021, Anderson won the Bronko Nagurski Trophy, was named the SEC Defensive Player of the Year, and was voted a unanimous All-American after recording 17.5 sacks and 34.5 tackles for loss, both of which led the nation. He finished fifth in Heisman Trophy voting.

On September 17, 2022, Anderson recorded a 25-yard interception return for a touchdown against Louisiana-Monroe. In the 2022 season, Anderson had 51 total tackles (24 solo), ten sacks, and one interception in 13 games. His ten sacks led the SEC for the 2022 season. He won the Bronko Nagurski Award, Chuck Bednarik Award, Lott Impact Trophy, and the Lombardi Award, in addition to being named a consensus All-American and the SEC Defensive Player of the Year.

== Professional career ==
Pre-draft measurables
Height	Weight	Arm length	Hand span	Wingspan	40-yard dash	10-yard split	20-yard split
6 ft 3 1/2 in (1.92 m)	253 lb (115 kg)	33 7/8 in (0.86 m)	9 7/8 in (0.25 m)	6 ft 9 in (2.06 m)	4.60 s	1.61 s	2.64 s
All values from the NFL Combine

=== 2023 ===
Anderson was selected third overall by the Houston Texans in the 2023 NFL draft, in which, they traded with the Arizona Cardinals from the 12th overall pick that they acquired from the Cleveland Browns in the Deshaun Watson trade to move up to third overall. On June 23, 2023, Anderson signed a four-year deal worth $35.2 million featuring a $22.6 million signing bonus. In his NFL debut against the Ravens in week 1, Anderson recorded one sack and six total tackles. In week 13, against the Broncos, he recorded his first multi-sack game with two. As a rookie, he started in 13 games and appeared in 15. He finished with seven sacks, 45 total tackles (29 solo), and one pass defended. He was named to the PFWA NFL All-Rookie Team. He was named Defensive Rookie of the Year.

Anderson was named to the 2023 Pro Bowl following an injury to American Football Conference starter Maxx Crosby.

In his postseason debut, Anderson had a sack in the 45–14 victory over the Browns in the Wild Card Round.

=== 2024 ===
In week 6 of the 2024 season, Anderson recorded three sacks, eight tackles and four tackles for loss in a 41–21 win over the New England Patriots, earning AFC Defensive Player of the Week. He was named AFC Defensive Player of the Month for October. He finished the 2024 season with 11 sacks, 37 tackles, two passes defended, one forced fumble, and one fumble recovery. He had 1.5 sacks and two passes defended in the 32–12 win over the Chargers in the Wild Card Round. In the Divisional Round, he had two sacks in the 23–14 loss to the Kansas City Chiefs. He was ranked 46th by his fellow players on the NFL Top 100 Players of 2025.

=== 2025 ===
In Week 7, against the Seattle Seahawks, Anderson had a fumble recovery for a touchdown in the 27–19 loss. In Week 12, he had 2.5 sacks against the Buffalo Bills. He finished the 2025 season with 12 sacks, 54 tackles, three passes defended, three forced fumbles, two fumble recoveries, and one fumble recovery for a touchdown. He was named as a first team All-Pro and a Pro Bowler. He had three sacks in the Texans' 28–16 loss to the Patriots in the Divisional Round.

=== 2026 ===
On April 8, 2026, the Texans exercised the fifth-year option on Anderson’s contract. On April 17, he signed a three-year, $150 million contract extension with $134 million guaranteed, making him the highest-paid non-quarterback in the league.

== Career statistics ==
Legend
	Led the league
**Bold**	Career high

=== NFL ===
==== Regular season ====
Year	Team	Games		Tackles					Fumbles				Interceptions			
Year	Team	GP	GS	Cmb	Solo	Ast	Sck	TFL	FF	FR	Yds	TD	Int	Yds	TD	PD
2023	HOU	15	13	45	29	16	7.0	10	0	0	0	0	0	0	0	1
2024	HOU	14	14	37	27	10	11.0	16	1	1	0	0	0	0	0	2
2025	HOU	17	17	**54**	**35**	**19**	**12.0**	**20**	**3**	**2**	0	**1**	0	0	0	**3**
2026	HOU	7	7	33	17	16	11.5	10	1	1	**1**	0	0	0	0	1
Career		53	51	169	108	61	41.5	56	5	4	1	1	0	0	0	7

==== Postseason ====
Year	Team	Games		Tackles					Fumbles				Interceptions			
Year	Team	GP	GS	Cmb	Solo	Ast	Sck	TFL	FF	FR	Yds	TD	Int	Yds	TD	PD
2023	HOU	2	2	4	3	1	1.0	2	0	0	—	—	—	—	—	0
2024	HOU	2	2	**7**	**6**	1	**3.5**	**4**	0	0	—	—	—	—	—	**2**
2025	HOU	2	2	6	3	**3**	**3.5**	2	**3**	0	—	—	—	—	—	0
Career		6	6	17	12	5	8.0	8	3	0	—	—	—	—	—	2

=== College ===
Legend
Led the NCAA

Year	Team	GP	Tackles					Interceptions					Fumbles			
Year	Team	GP	Cmb	Solo	Ast	TFL	Sck	Int	Yds	Avg	TD	PD	FF	FR	Yds	TD
2020	Alabama	13	52	33	19	10.5	7.0	0	0	—	0	0	**1**	0	0	0
2021	Alabama	15	**102**	**58**	**44**	**34.5**	**17.5**	0	0	—	0	**3**	0	0	0	0
2022	Alabama	13	51	24	27	17.0	10.0	**1**	**25**	**25.0**	**1**	1	0	0	0	0
Career		41	205	115	90	62.0	34.5	1	25	25.0	1	4	1	0	0	0

== Career highlights ==
=== Awards and honors ===
==== NFL ====
- AP NFL Defensive Rookie of the Year (2023)
- 2× Pro Bowl (2023, 2025)
- First-team AP All-Pro Team (2025)
- PFWA NFL All-Rookie Team (2023)
- PFWA NFL Defensive Rookie of the Year (2023)
- AFC Defensive Player of the Month (October 2024)
- AFC Defensive Player of the Week (Week 6: 2024)
- Ranked No. 46 in the Top 100 Players of 2025
- Ranked No. 12 in the Top 100 Players of 2026

==== College ====
- Chuck Bednarik Award (2022)
- 2× Bronko Nagurski Trophy (2021, 2022)
- Rotary Lombardi Award (2022)
- Lott IMPACT Trophy (2022)
- 2× Unanimous All-American (2021, 2022)
- 2× SEC Defensive Player of the Year (2021, 2022)
- 2× First-team All-SEC (2021, 2022)
- SEC All-Freshman Team (2020)
- Second-team All-SEC (AP) (2020)

==== Houston Texans franchise records ====
- Most sacks by a rookie in a season: 7.0 (2023)

== Personal life ==
Anderson is a Christian. He is the son of Will Anderson Sr. and Tereon Anderson. He has five older sisters.
