= Quinn Meinerz =

American football player (born 1998)

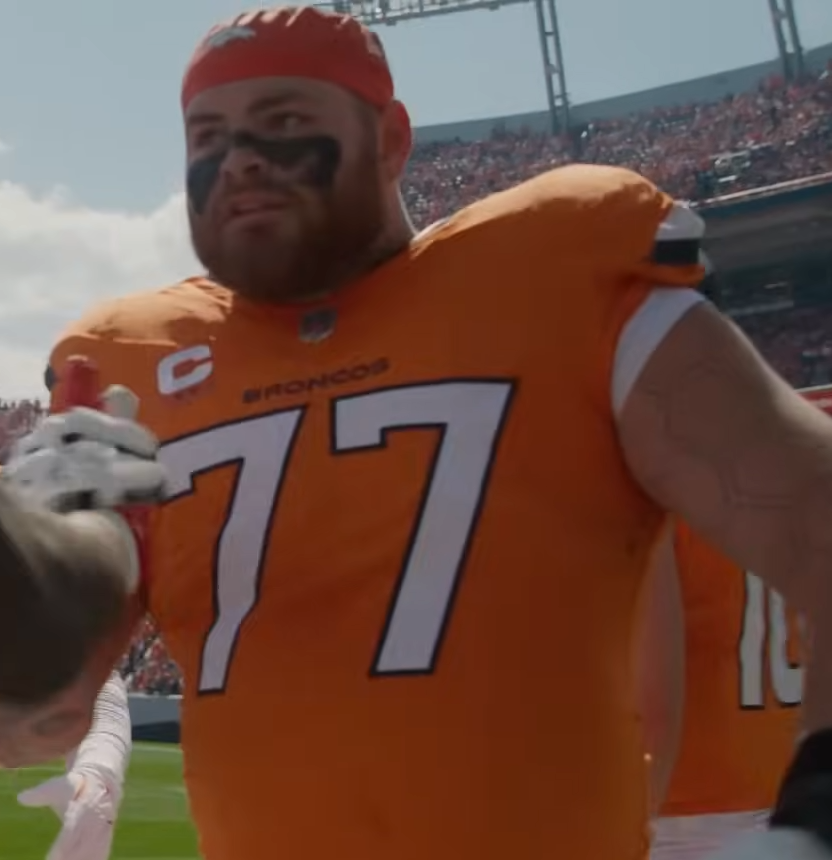
- Meinerz with the Denver Broncos in 2025

No. 77 – Denver Broncos
- Position: Guard
- Roster status: Active

Personal information
- Born: November 15, 1998 (age 27); Hartford, Wisconsin, U.S.
- Listed height: 6 ft 3 in (1.91 m)
- Listed weight: 320 lb (145 kg)

Career information
- High school: Hartford Union
- College: UW–Whitewater (2017–2020)
- NFL draft: 2021: 3rd round, 98th overall pick

Career history
- Denver Broncos (2021–present)

Awards and highlights
- 2× First-team All-Pro (2024, 2025); Pro Bowl (2025); First-team DIII All-American (2019); 2× First-team All-WIAC (2018, 2019)

Career NFL statistics as of 2025
- Games played: 79
- Games started: 73
- Stats at Pro Football Reference

Quinn Meinerz (born November 15, 1998) is an American professional football guard for the Denver Broncos of the National Football League (NFL). He played college football for the UW–Whitewater Warhawks.

== Early life ==
Meinerz grew up in Hartford, Wisconsin and attended Hartford Union High School, where he was a member of the football, track and field, and wrestling teams. He placed 5th as a senior at the WIAA Wrestling State Championships at 285 pounds. He was named honorable mention All-State as both an offensive and defensive lineman as a senior. Meinerz chose to play college football at NCAA Division III Wisconsin–Whitewater over St. Cloud State and Wisconsin–La Crosse.

== College career ==
Meinerz played in two games as a freshman before becoming a starter as a sophomore, when he was named first team All-Wisconsin Intercollegiate Athletic Conference (WIAC). Meinerz was named first team All-WIAC and a first team Division III All-American by the Associated Press. The 2020 NCAA Division III football season was canceled due to COVID-19 pandemic and he spent the year training at his family's hunting and fishing camp in Ontario. Meinerz played in the 2021 Senior Bowl.

== Professional career ==
Pre-draft measurables
Height	Weight	Arm length	Hand span	Wingspan	40-yard dash	10-yard split	20-yard split	20-yard shuttle	Three-cone drill	Vertical jump	Broad jump
6 ft 2 7/8 in (1.90 m)	320 lb (145 kg)	33 3/8 in (0.85 m)	10 1/8 in (0.26 m)	6 ft 9 3/8 in (2.07 m)	4.99 s	1.73 s	2.88 s	4.58 s	7.54 s	32.0 in (0.81 m)	9 ft 3 in (2.82 m)
All values from Pro Day

Meinerz was selected 98th overall in the third round of the 2021 NFL draft by the Denver Broncos. He was the highest drafted football player in Wisconsin–Whitewater history and the first since 2007. In Meinerz's rookie season on the Broncos, he played in 15 of the 17 regular season games and started every game after Week 9, totaling 9 starts on the season.

On July 17, 2024, Meinerz signed a four-year, $80 million extension, keeping him under contract through the 2028 season.

Meinerz was named a first-team All-Pro at right guard for the 2024 season. He was later invited to the Pro Bowl as the first alternate but declined to participate, stating that he didn't want to attend as a replacement.

In 2025, Meinerz excelled once again and was named to the Pro Bowl and first-team All-Pro rosters. He was also named as a finalist for the inaugural NFL Protector of the Year Award.

On March 8, 2026, the Broncos restructured Meinerz's contract in order to save $11 million of cap space.
