= Ross Matiscik =

American football player (born 1996)

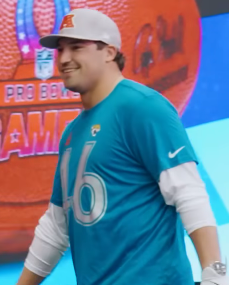
- Matiscik at the 2026 Pro Bowl Games

No. 46 – Jacksonville Jaguars
- Position: Long snapper
- Roster status: Active

Personal information
- Born: September 13, 1996 (age 30); Youngstown, Ohio, U.S.
- Listed height: 6 ft 0 in (1.83 m)
- Listed weight: 240 lb (109 kg)

Career information
- High school: McKinney Boyd (McKinney, Texas)
- College: Baylor (2015–2019)
- NFL draft: 2020: undrafted

Career history
- Jacksonville Jaguars (2020–present)

Awards and highlights
- 2× First-team All-Pro (2023, 2025); Second-team All-Pro (2024); 3× Pro Bowl (2023–2025)

Career NFL statistics as of Week 8, 2026
- Games played: 107
- Total tackles: 24
- Forced fumbles: 1
- Fumble recoveries: 1
- Stats at Pro Football Reference

Ross Matiscik (born September 13, 1996) is an American professional football long snapper for the Jacksonville Jaguars of the National Football League (NFL). He played college football for the Baylor Bears.

== Early life ==
Matiscik was born in Youngstown, Ohio. He grew up in McKinney, Texas, and attended McKinney Boyd High School, where he played baseball and football. As a three-year letter winner, Matiscik played offensive line and linebacker, especially excelling as a middle linebacker. As a senior, Matiscik was named an all-state linebacker and District 6-6A's Defensive MVP, completing his career with 233 tackles, 12 sacks, 4 interceptions, and a blocked field goal. Despite this, he was not recruited by any division one teams coming out of high school.

== College career ==
Matiscik was a member of the Baylor Bears for five seasons, redshirting as a true freshman and joining the team as a walk-on. During his redshirt year, he was moved to the long snapper position. While he was Baylor's primary long snapper for four seasons, Matiscik also served as a reserve linebacker for the Bears.

== Professional career ==
Pre-draft measurables
Height	Weight
5 ft 11 3/4 in (1.82 m)	235 lb (107 kg)
Values from Pro Day

Matiscik was signed by the Jacksonville Jaguars as an undrafted free agent on April 26, 2020. He made the 53-man roster out of training camp, beating out incumbent long snapper Matthew Orzech. Matiscik made his NFL debut on September 13, 2020, in the season opener against the Indianapolis Colts.

On April 29, 2022, Matiscik signed a five-year, $5.965 million contract extension with the Jaguars through the 2026 season.

On January 3, 2024, Matiscik was selected to his first Pro Bowl. For his efforts in 2023, he was also selected as a member of the All-Pro First Team by the NFL Players Association and the Associated Press. Matiscik led the league in total tackles (8) among long snappers for the 2023 season, recorded a forced fumble and fumble recovery, and has never had a bad snap since his NFL debut.

Matiscik was named to his second consecutive Pro Bowl and NFLPA All-Pro First-Team following the 2024 season. He was subsequently named to his third Pro Bowl on December 23, 2025.

On June 17, 2026, Matiscik signed a two-year, $3.8 million contract extension with the Jaguars, making him the league's highest-paid long snapper.

== Personal life ==
Ross' brother, Brent, played 4 years for the TCU Horned Frogs as a long snapper and was signed to the Cleveland Browns as an undrafted free agent.
