= Jaylen Reed =

American football player (born 2003)

No. 26 – New England Patriots
- Position: Safety
- Roster status: Active

Personal information
- Born: January 29, 2003 (age 23); Detroit, Michigan, U.S.
- Listed height: 6 ft 0 in (1.83 m)
- Listed weight: 212 lb (96 kg)

Career information
- High school: Martin Luther King Jr (Detroit)
- College: Penn State (2021–2024)
- NFL draft: 2025: 6th round, 187th overall pick

Career history
- Houston Texans (2025); New England Patriots (2026–present)

Awards and highlights
- Second-team All-Big Ten (2024)

Career NFL statistics as of Week 10, 2026
- Total tackles: 27
- Sacks: 0.5
- Fumble recoveries: 1
- Pass deflections: 1
- Stats at Pro Football Reference

Jaylen MarQuiese Reed (born January 29, 2003) is an American professional football safety for the New England Patriots of the National Football League (NFL). He played college football for the Penn State Nittany Lions and was selected by the Houston Texans in the sixth round of the 2025 NFL draft.

== Early life ==
Reed attended Martin Luther King Jr. High School in Detroit, Michigan. He committed to Penn State University to play college football.

== College career ==
As a true freshman at Penn State in 2021, Reed played in eight games and had six tackles. As a sophomore in 2022, he played in all 13 games and had 31 tackles. Reed started all 13 games as a junior in 2023 and finished with 46 tackles, two interceptions and one sack. He returned as a starter his senior year in 2024.

On January 13, 2025, Reed declared for the 2025 NFL draft.

== Professional career ==
Pre-draft measurables
Height	Weight	Arm length	Hand span	Wingspan	40-yard dash	10-yard split	20-yard split	Vertical jump	Bench press
5 ft 11 5/8 in (1.82 m)	211 lb (96 kg)	30 3/8 in (0.77 m)	9 in (0.23 m)	6 ft 2 1/4 in (1.89 m)	4.49 s	1.51 s	2.59 s	33.5 in (0.85 m)	19 reps
All values from NFL Combine

=== Houston Texans ===
Reed was selected by the Houston Texans in the sixth round (187th overall) in the 2025 NFL draft. He began the regular season on the PUP list due to a knee injury. Reed was activated for his NFL debut on October 20, 2025. He made seven appearances (one start) for Houston, recording one fumble recovery and 14 combined tackles. On December 6, Reed was placed on season-ending injured reserve due to a forearm injury suffered in Week 13 against the Indianapolis Colts.

On January 8, 2026, after the Texans clinched the No. 5 seed in the AFC, Reed returned to practice for his team's matchup against the Pittsburgh Steelers in the Wild Card Round. Four days later, Reed was activated by the Texans.

=== New England Patriots ===
On August 24, 2026, Reed was traded to the New England Patriots along with a 2028 seventh-round draft pick from the Houston Texans in exchange for wide receiver Kayshon Boutte.

== NFL career statistics ==
=== Regular season ===
Year	Team	Games		Tackles					Interceptions						Fumbles			
Year	Team	GP	GS	Cmb	Solo	Ast	Sck	TFL	Int	Yds	Avg	Lng	TD	PD	FF	FR	Yds	TD
2025	HOU	7	1	14	9	5	0.0	0	0	0	0.0	0	0	0	0	1	9	0
2026	NWE	10	1	13	5	8	0.5	0	0	0	0.0	0	0	1	0	0	0	0
Career		17	2	27	14	13	0.5	0	0	0	0.0	0	0	1	0	1	9	0

=== Postseason ===
Year	Team	Games		Tackles					Interceptions						Fumbles			
Year	Team	GP	GS	Cmb	Solo	Ast	Sck	TFL	Int	Yds	Avg	Lng	TD	PD	FF	FR	Yds	TD
2025	HOU	2	2	5	1	4	0.0	0	0	0	0.0	0	0	0	0	0	0	0
Career		2	2	5	1	4	0.0	0	0	0	0.0	0	0	0	0	0	0	0
