= American Christian Academy (Alabama) =

67 school

Location
- 2300 Veterans Memorial Parkway; Tuscaloosa, Alabama 012679; United States
- 33°11′51″N 87°30′29″W

Information
- Type: Private school
- Established: 1979 (47 years ago)
- Principal: Austin Grammer
- Headmaster: Stephen Hooks
- Teaching staff: 93.8 (on an FTE basis)
- Grades: PK–12
- Enrollment: 1,014 (2021–2022)
- Student to teacher ratio: 28:1
- Colors: Royal Blue, Scarlet Red & White
- Nickname: Patriots
- Website: www.acacademy.com

American Christian Academy is a private Christian school located in Tuscaloosa, Alabama, United States, with students in grades PK–12. It operates in the former Eastwood Middle School on Veterans Memorial Parkway, which it purchased from the Tuscaloosa City School Board. ACA is a member of the Association of Christian Schools International (ACSI). ACA has been a fully accredited school since 1990.

== Demographics ==
The demographic breakdown of the 894 K–12 students enrolled in 2021–22 was:

- Asian - 1.5%
- Black - 1.7%
- Hispanic - 2.1%
- White - 94.4%
- Multiracial - 0.3%

== Athletics ==
The American Christian Academy Patriots compete as a private school in the Alabama High School Athletic Association (AHSAA). School colors are Royal Blue, Scarlet Red & White. The following AHSAA sanctioned sports are offered:

- Baseball (boys)
  - State champion - 2004, 2005, 2006, 2009, 2011
- Basketball (boys and girls)
- Bowling (boys and girls)
  - State champion - 2022, 2023
- Cross country (boys)
  - State champion - 2015, 2016, 2017, 2020
- Football (boys)
- Golf (boys and girls)
- Soccer (boys and girls)
- Softball (girls)
- Tennis (boys and girls)
- Volleyball (girls)
- Wrestling (boys)

In addition, the Patriots were girls state champions in indoor track 2015–18 and boys indoor track 2017–18 In outdoor track, the girls were state champions 2007–2012, 2015, 2017 and 2018 and the boys were state champions in 2017 and 2018.
