= Ajani Carter =

American football player (born 2000)

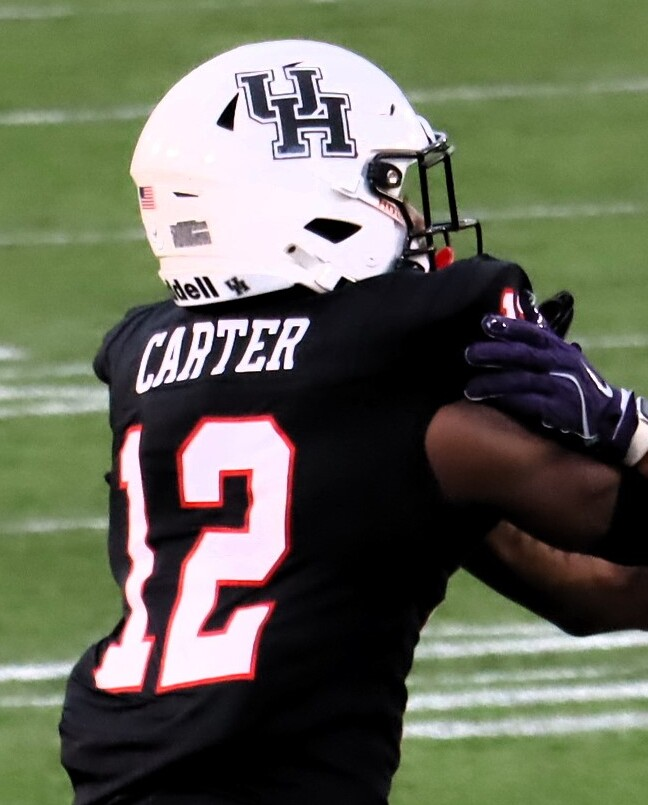
- Carter in 2024

Profile
- Position: Cornerback

Personal information
- Born: August 17, 2000 (age 26); Houston, Texas, U.S.
- Listed height: 6 ft 2 in (1.88 m)
- Listed weight: 200 lb (91 kg)

Career information
- High school: North Shore Senior High School (Houston, Texas)
- College: Utah State (2019–2022); Houston (2024)
- NFL draft: 2025: undrafted

Career history
- Kansas City Chiefs (2025)*; Houston Texans (2025)
- * Offseason or practice squad member only

Career NFL statistics as of 2025
- Games played: 2
- Stats at Pro Football Reference

Ajani Carter (born August 17, 2000) is an American professional football cornerback. He played college football for the Houston Cougars and Utah State Aggies.

== Early life ==
Carter attended North Shore Senior High School in Houston, Texas. In December 2018, he caught the Hail Mary pass that sent North Shore past Duncanville to win the Class 6A Division I state championship. Carter was a three-star recruit and received offers from Indiana, Utah State, Southern Miss, and others. He chose to commit to Utah State.

== College career ==
=== Utah State ===
Carter played at Utah State from 2019 to 2022. For the first two years, he played as a wide receiver before converting to a defensive back. In the span of four years, he totaled 108 tackles, two sacks, four interceptions, three forced fumbles, and one fumble recovery. At the end of the season, Carter entered the transfer portal.

=== Houston ===
Carter initially committed to Baylor but flipped to Houston. In the 2024 season, Carter played 11 games and totaled 22 tackles, 0.5 sacks, and three pass breakups.

== Professional career ==
Pre-draft measurables
| Height | Weight | Arm length | Hand span | Wingspan | 40-yard dash | 10-yard split | 20-yard split | 20-yard shuttle | Three-cone drill | Vertical jump | Broad jump | Bench press |
|---|---|---|---|---|---|---|---|---|---|---|---|---|
| 6 ft 0 in (1.83 m) | 193 lb (88 kg) | 32 in (0.81 m) | 10 1/8 in (0.26 m) | 6 ft 3 1/2 in (1.92 m) | 4.53 s | 1.54 s | 2.61 s | 4.38 s | 6.95 s | 31.5 in (0.80 m) | 9 ft 10 in (3.00 m) | 18 reps |
All values from Pro Day

=== Kansas City Chiefs ===
Carter went unselected in the 2025 NFL draft. On August 1, 2025, Carter signed with the Kansas City Chiefs as an undrafted free agent. He was waived by Kansas City as part of the team's final roster cuts on August 26.

=== Houston Texans ===
On September 17, 2025, the Houston Texans signed Carter to their practice squad. On November 15, the Texans added Carter to their roster as a standard gameday practice squad elevation. He made his NFL debut the next day against the Tennessee Titans, playing 20 snaps on special teams. Carter was signed to Houston's active roster on November 20. He would make one more appearance for the Texans, logging 16 special teams snaps against the Buffalo Bills in Week 12. On November 29, Carter was placed on injured reserve due to a hamstring injury.

On May 21, 2026, Carter was waived by the Texans with an injury designation. He reverted to injured reserve the next day, as a result of having undergone arthroscopic knee surgery the week prior. On July 1, Carter was waived from IR with an injury settlement.
