= 2023 Seattle Seahawks season =

American football team season

- Owner: Estate of Paul Allen
- General manager: John Schneider
- Head coach: Pete Carroll
- Home stadium: Lumen Field

Results
- Record: 9–8
- Division place: 3rd NFC West
- Playoffs: Did not qualify
- All-Pros: LB Bobby Wagner (2nd team)
- Pro Bowlers: 6: CB Devon Witherspoon; LB Bobby Wagner; SS Julian Love; QB Geno Smith; WR DK Metcalf; ST Nick Bellore

Uniform
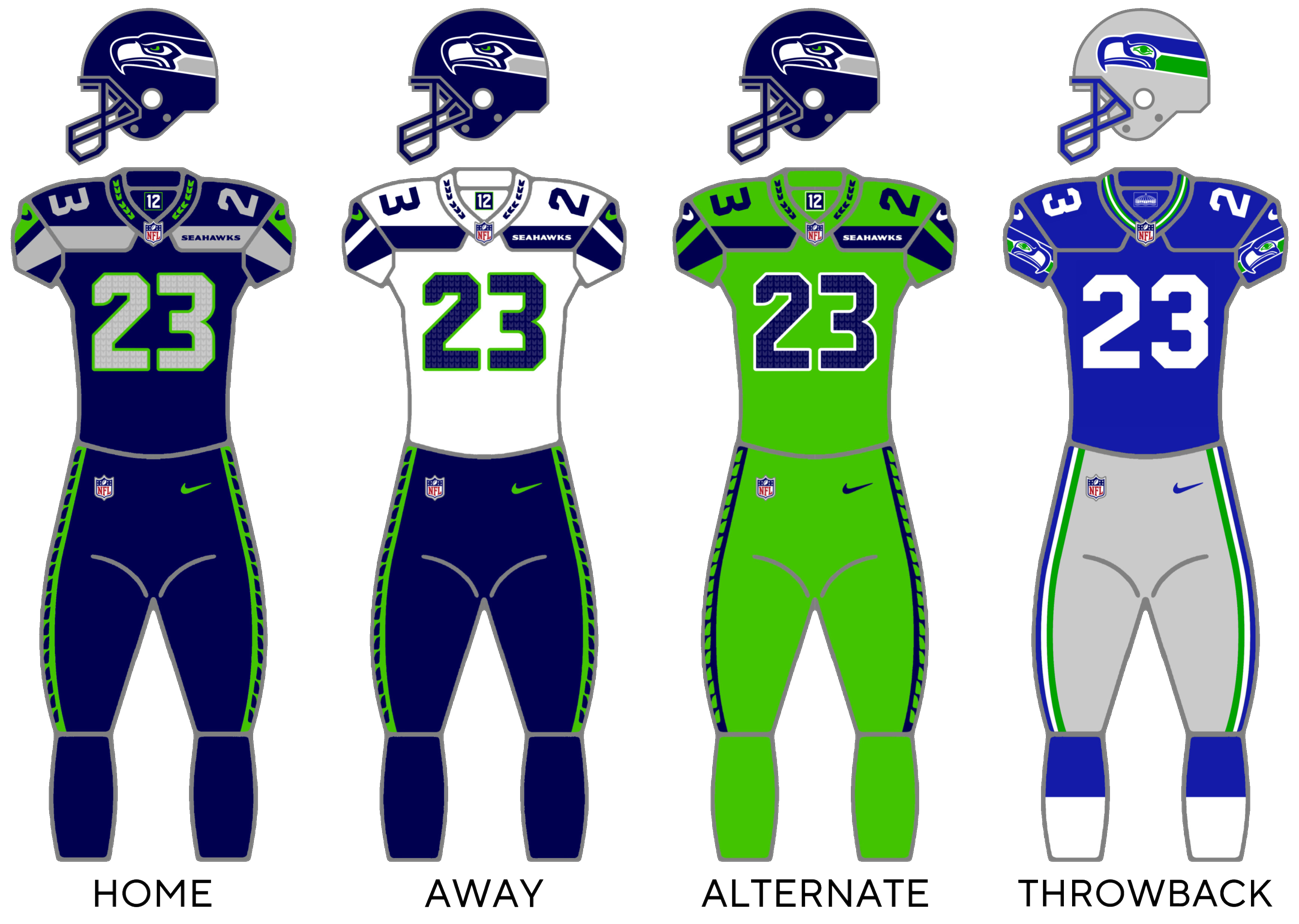

The 2023 season was the Seattle Seahawks' 48th in the National Football League (NFL) and their 14th and final season under the head coach/general manager tandem of Pete Carroll and John Schneider. The Seahawks matched their 9–8 record from the previous year, but unlike 2022, it was not enough to qualify for the playoffs, as they finished in third place in the division behind the San Francisco 49ers and Los Angeles Rams, and in a three-way tie with the Green Bay Packers and New Orleans Saints for the last Wild Card spot, which the Packers claimed on a strength of victory tiebreaker.

Despite a 5–2 start, key injuries to Geno Smith, Kenneth Walker III, DK Metcalf, and Devon Witherspoon, and poor defensive play led to the Seahawks losing five of their next six. While the Seahawks would win two games in a row, a loss to the Steelers cost them control of their own destiny. In total, Seattle played 11 games and went 3–8 against teams that finished with a winning record (Cincinnati being the only one that missed the postseason), culminating in a collapse that cost them an appearance in the postseason.

This was the second time in three seasons that Seattle missed the playoffs, and was the first season since 2009 that Dave Canales was not on the team's payroll, as the Tampa Bay Buccaneers hired him to be their offensive coordinator for one year. Canales would go on to be hired as the head coach of the Carolina Panthers the following year.

On March 26, 2023, the Seahawks resigned longtime linebacker Bobby Wagner, who played for the Los Angeles Rams during the previous season, for a second stint with the team.

On January 10, 2024, three days following the season's conclusion, head coach Pete Carroll and the Seahawks mutually agreed to part ways, having served since 2010. Carroll would transition to an unspecified advisory role within the Seahawks organization before subsequently being hired as head coach of the Las Vegas Raiders the following year.

The Seattle Seahawks drew an average home attendance of 68,735 in eight home games in the 2023 NFL season, the 18th highest in the league.

== Draft ==
2023 Seattle Seahawks draft selections
Round	Selection	Player	Position	College	Notes
1	5	Devon Witherspoon	CB	Illinois	From Broncos (Note: The Seahawks traded a 2022 fourth-round selection and QB Russell Wilson to the Denver Broncos in exchange for first- and second-round selections (5th and 37th overall), 2022 first-, second- and fifth-round selections, QB Drew Lock, DT Shelby Harris and TE Noah Fant.)
1	20	Jaxon Smith-Njigba	WR	Ohio State	
2	37	Derick Hall	DE	Auburn	From Broncos
2	52	Zach Charbonnet	RB	UCLA	
3	83	Traded to the Denver Broncos (Note: The Seahawks traded a third-round selection (83rd overall) to the Denver Broncos in exchange for a fourth-round selection (108th overall) and a 2024 third-round selection.)			
4	108	Anthony Bradford	G	LSU	From Broncos
4	123	Cameron Young	DT	Mississippi State	
5	151	Mike Morris	DE	Michigan	From Steelers (Note: The Seahawks traded CB Ahkello Witherspoon to the Pittsburgh Steelers in exchange for a fifth-round selection (151st overall).)
5	154	Olusegun Oluwatimi	C	Michigan	
6	198	Jerrick Reed II	S	New Mexico	
7	237	Kenny McIntosh	RB	Georgia	

2023 Seattle Seahawks undrafted free agents
Name	Position	College	Ref.
Holton Ahlers	QB	East Carolina	
M. J. Anderson	DE	Iowa State	
Michael Ayers	LB	Ashland	
Jake Bobo	WR	UCLA	
Lance Boykin	CB	Coastal Carolina	
Cam Bright	LB	Washington	
Arquon Bush	CB	Cincinnati	
James Campbell	CB	Montana State	
Robert Cooper	DT	Florida State	
Noah Gindorff	TE	North Dakota State	
John Hall	WR	Northwood	
Griffin Hebert	TE	Louisiana Tech	
C. J. Johnson	WR	East Carolina	
Matt Landers	WR	Arkansas	
Tyjon Lindsey	WR	Oregon State	
Patrick O'Connell	LB	Montana	
Ty Okada	S	Montana State	
Morrell Osling III	S	UCLA	
Kendall Randolph	G	Alabama	
Chris Smith	RB	Louisiana	
Chris Stoll	LS	Penn State	
Jonathan Sutherland	S	Penn State	
Jacob Sykes	DE	UCLA	
Jonah Tavai	DT	San Diego State	
Christian Young	S	Arizona	

Draft trades

== Staff ==
2023 Seattle Seahawks staff
Front office: Owning entity – Paul G. Allen Trust; Chairwoman/trustee – Jody Allen; Vice chairman – Bert Kolde; President – Chuck Arnold; Executive vice president/general manager – John Schneider; Vice president of football administration – Matt Thomas; Vice president of player personnel – Trent Kirchner; Director of college scouting – Matt Berry; Assistant director of college scouting – Aaron Hineline; Director of pro personnel – Nolan Teasley; Assistant director of pro personnel – Willie Schneider; Personnel executive – Jason Barnes; Head coaches: Head coach/executive vice president of football operations – Pete Carroll; Associate head coach– Carl Smith; Offensive coaches: Offensive coordinator – Shane Waldron; Quarterbacks – Greg Olson; Assistant quarterbacks – Kerry Joseph; Run game coordinator/running backs – Chad Morton; Offensive passing game coordinator/wide receivers – Sanjay Lal; Tight ends – Pat McPherson; Offensive line – Andy Dickerson; Assistant offensive line – Keli'i Kekuewa; Senior offensive assistant – Nate Carroll; Offensive assistant – Donovan Jackson; Offensive assistant – Robbie Picazo	Defensive coaches: Defensive coordinator – Clint Hurtt; Assistant defensive line/defensive tackles – Damione Lewis; Linebackers – John Glenn; Secondary – Roy Anderson; Assistant defensive backs/cornerbacks – DeShawn Shead; Defensive passing game coordinator/senior assistant – Karl Scott; Defensive assistant – Neiko Thorpe; Defensive assistant/defensive line – Will Tukuafu; Pass rush specialist – BT Jordan; Special teams coaches: Special teams coordinator – Larry Izzo; Assistant special teams coach – Tracy Smith; Assistant coach – Daren Bates; Strength and conditioning: Head strength and conditioning – Ivan Lewis; Assistant strength and conditioning – Thomas Garcia; Assistant strength and conditioning – Mark Philipp; Assistant strength and conditioning – Grant Steen; Assistant strength and conditioning – Danny Van Dijk; Assistant strength and conditioning – Jamie Yanchar

== Final roster ==
2023 Seattle Seahawks roster
Quarterbacks (QB): 2 Drew Lock; 7 Geno Smith; Running backs (RB): 44 Nick Bellore FB; 26 Zach Charbonnet; 31 DeeJay Dallas; 25 Kenny McIntosh; 9 Kenneth Walker III; Wide receivers (WR): 19 Jake Bobo; 16 Tyler Lockett; 14 DK Metcalf; 11 Jaxon Smith-Njigba; 83 Dareke Young; Tight ends (TE): 89 Will Dissly; 87 Noah Fant; 84 Colby Parkinson; 38 Brady Russell	Offensive linemen (OL): 75 Anthony Bradford G; 63 Evan Brown C; 74 Jake Curhan T; 66 McClendon Curtis G; 78 Stone Forsythe T; 68 Damien Lewis G; 72 Abraham Lucas T; 67 Charles Cross T; 79 Raiqwon O'Neal T; 51 Olusegun Oluwatimi C; 70 Jason Peters T; Defensive linemen (DL): 95 Myles Adams DE; 97 Mario Edwards Jr. DE; 55 Dre'Mont Jones DE; 90 Jarran Reed DE; 99 Leonard Williams DE	Linebackers (LB): 56 Jordyn Brooks ILB; 0 Devin Bush Jr. ILB; 58 Derick Hall OLB; 53 Boye Mafe OLB; 50 Patrick O'Connell OLB; 59 Jon Rhattigan ILB; 52 Darrell Taylor OLB; 54 Bobby Wagner ILB; Defensive backs (DB): 22 Tre Brown CB; 23 Artie Burns CB; 8 Coby Bryant CB; 6 Quandre Diggs FS; 30 Mike Jackson Sr. CB; 20 Julian Love SS; 39 Ty Okada SS; 21 Devon Witherspoon CB; 27 Tariq Woolen CB; Special teams (ST): 4 Michael Dickson P; 5 Jason Myers K; 41 Chris Stoll LS	Practice squad: 98 Levi Bell OLB; 18 Lance Boykin CB; 77 Matthew Gotel NT; 62 Joey Hunt C; 88 Cade Johnson WR; 28 Kelvin Joseph CB; 40 Bryant Koback RB; 85 Tyler Mabry TE; 15 Sean Mannion QB; 92 Hamilcar Rashed Jr. DE; 34 Jonathan Sutherland S; 13 Cody Thompson WR; 82 Cody White WR; 86 Easop Winston WR; Reserve: 33 Jamal Adams SS (IR); 1 D'Wayne Eskridge WR (IR); 60 Phil Haynes G (IR); 91 Bryan Mone NT (PUP); 94 Mike Morris DE (IR); 10 Uchenna Nwosu OLB (IR); 49 Joshua Onujiogu OLB (IR); 32 Jerrick Reed II FS (IR); 42 Drake Thomas ILB (IR); Rookies in italics 53 active, 9 reserve, 14 practice squad

== Preseason ==
Week	Date	Opponent	Result	Record	Venue	Recap
1	August 10	Minnesota Vikings	W 24–13	1–0	Lumen Field	Recap
2	August 19	Dallas Cowboys	W 22–14	2–0	Lumen Field	Recap
3	August 26	at Green Bay Packers	L 15–19	2–1	Lambeau Field	Recap

=== Game summaries ===
==== Preseason Week 1: vs. Minnesota Vikings ====
Preseason Week 1: Minnesota Vikings at Seattle Seahawks – Game summary

Quarter	1	2	3	4	Total
Vikings	3	7	3	0	13
Seahawks	0	7	10	7	24

at Lumen Field, Seattle, Washington

- Date: August 10
- Game time: 7:00 p.m. PDT
- Game weather: Partly Cloudy, 71 °F (22 °C)
- Referee: Ronald Torbert
- TV: KING-TV and NFL Network

Game information

First quarter

- MIN – Greg Joseph 26-yard field goal, 5:20. Vikings 3–0. Drive: 14 plays, 71 yards, 6:47.

Second quarter

- MIN – Nick Muse 4-yard pass from Nick Mullens (Greg Joseph kick), 11:26. Vikings 10–0. Drive: 11 plays, 80 yards, 5:37.
- SEA – Easop Winston Jr. 12-yard pass from Drew Lock (Jason Myers kick), 4:16. Vikings 10–7. Drive: 6 plays, 59 yards, 3:20.

Third quarter

- SEA – Jason Myers 35-yard field goal, 11:08. Tied 10–10. Drive: 8 plays, 59 yards, 3:52.
- MIN – Greg Joseph 54-yard field goal, 3:24. Vikings 13–10. Drive: 4 plays, 2 yards, 1:42.
- SEA – Jake Bobo 19-yard pass from Drew Lock (Jason Myers kick), 0:03. Seahawks 17–13. Drive: 5 plays, 32 yards, 3:20.

Fourth quarter

- SEA – Matt Landers 30-yard pass from Holton Ahlers (Jason Myers kick), 7:47. Seahawks 24–13. Drive: 6 plays, 64 yards, 3:08.

Top passers

- SEA - Drew Lock - 17/24, 191 yards, 2 TD, INT
- MIN - Nick Mullens - 14/20, 139 yards, TD

Top rushers

- SEA - Bryant Koback - 6 rushes, 32 yards
- MIN - Ty Chandler - 11 rushes, 41 yards

Top receivers

- SEA - Jake Bobo - 3 receptions, 55 yards, TD
- MIN - Jalen Reagor - 4 receptions, 55 yards

==== Preseason Week 2: vs Dallas Cowboys ====
Preseason Week 2: Dallas Cowboys at Seattle Seahawks – Game summary

Quarter	1	2	3	4	Total
Cowboys	0	7	7	0	14
Seahawks	3	14	0	5	22

at Lumen Field, Seattle, Washington

- Date: August 19
- Game time: 7:00 p.m. PDT
- TV: KING-TV

Game information

First quarter

- SEA - Jason Myers 57-yard field goal, 4:19. Seahawks 3–0. Drive: 7 plays, 58 yards, 3:43.

Second quarter

- DAL - Rico Dowdle 6-yard pass from Cooper Rush (Brandon Aubrey kick), 11:31. Cowboys 7–3. Drive: 17 plays, 80 yards, 7:58.
- SEA - DeeJay Dallas 1-yard run (Jason Myers kick), 8:55. Seahawks 10–7. Drive: 6 plays, 75 yards, 2:36.
- SEA - SaRodorick Thompson 1-yard run (Jason Myers kick), 2:35. Seahawks 17–7. Drive: 6 plays, 80 yards, 3:01.

Third quarter

- DAL - Deuce Vaughn 14-yard run (Brandon Aubrey kick), 11:39. Seahawks 17–14. Drive: 6 plays, 71 yards, 3:21.

Fourth quarter

- SEA - Jason Myers 36-yard field goal, 9:38. Seahawks 20–14. Drive: 11 plays, 62 yards, 4:34.
- SEA - Rico Dowdle runs out of bounds in the end zone for a team safety, 8:05. Seahawks 22–14.

Top passers

- SEA - Drew Lock - 5/6, 119 yards
- DAL - Will Grier - 13/18, 136 yards, INT

Top rushers

- SEA - SaRodorick Thompson - 11 rushes, 50 yards, TD
- DAL - Rico Dowdle - 8 rushes, 38 yards

Top receivers

- SEA - Jaxon Smith-Njigba - 3 receptions, 58 yards
- DAL - Jalen Tolbert - 4 receptions, 66 yards

==== Preseason Week 3: at Green Bay Packers ====
Preseason Week 3: Seattle Seahawks at Green Bay Packers – Game summary

Quarter	1	2	3	4	Total
Seahawks	0	7	0	8	15
Packers	3	9	0	7	19

at Lambeau Field, Green Bay, Wisconsin

- Date: August 26
- Game time: 10:00 a.m. PDT
- TV: KING-TV

Game information

First quarter

- GB - Anders Carlson 43-yard field goal, 9:54. Packers 3–0. Drive: 11 plays, 50 yards, 5:06.

Second quarter

- GB - Christian Watson 6-yard pass from Jordan Love (Anders Carlson kick blocked), 12:00. Packers 9–0. Drive: 15 plays, 80 yards, 4:54.
- SEA - Jake Bobo 18-yard pass from Drew Lock (Jason Myers kick), 2:46. Packers 9–7. Drive: 5 plays, 61 yards, 1:56.
- GB - Anders Carlson 57-yard field goal, 0:14. Packers 12–7. Drive: 9 plays, 36 yards, 2:32.

Third quarter

- No scoring plays.

Fourth quarter

- SEA - SaRodorick Thompson 1-yard run (Drew Lock pass), 6:38. Seahawks 15–12. Drive: 10 plays, 89 yards, 5:07.
- GB - Nate McCrary 1-yard run (Anders Carlson kick), 1:56. Packers 19–15. Drive: 9 plays, 75 yards, 4:42.

Top passers

- SEA - Drew Lock - 16/25, 150 yards, TD
- GB - Alex McGough - 4/5, 69 yards

Top rushers

- SEA - DeeJay Dallas - 4 rushes, 43 yards
- GB - Emanuel Wilson - 17 rushes, 49 yards

Top receivers

- SEA - Easop Winston Jr. - 3 receptions, 74 yards
- GB - Jadakis Bonds - 2 receptions, 60 yards

== Regular season ==
=== Schedule ===
Divisional matchups: the NFC West played the NFC East and the AFC North.

Week	Date	Opponent	Result	Record	Venue	Recap
1	September 10	**Los Angeles Rams**	**L** 13–30	0–1	Lumen Field	Recap
2	September 17	at Detroit Lions	**W** 37–31 (OT)	1–1	Ford Field	Recap
3	September 24	Carolina Panthers	**W** 37–27	2–1	Lumen Field	Recap
4	October 2	at New York Giants	**W** 24–3	3–1	MetLife Stadium	Recap
5	Bye					
6	October 15	at Cincinnati Bengals	**L** 13–17	3–2	Paycor Stadium	Recap
7	October 22	**Arizona Cardinals**	**W** 20–10	4–2	Lumen Field	Recap
8	October 29	Cleveland Browns	**W** 24–20	5–2	Lumen Field	Recap
9	November 5	at Baltimore Ravens	**L** 3–37	5–3	M&T Bank Stadium	Recap
10	November 12	Washington Commanders	**W** 29–26	6–3	Lumen Field	Recap
11	November 19	at **Los Angeles Rams**	**L** 16–17	6–4	SoFi Stadium	Recap
12	November 23	**San Francisco 49ers**	**L** 13–31	6–5	Lumen Field	Recap
13	November 30	at Dallas Cowboys	**L** 35–41	6–6	AT&T Stadium	Recap
14	December 10	at **San Francisco 49ers**	**L** 16–28	6–7	Levi's Stadium	Recap
15	December 18	Philadelphia Eagles	**W** 20–17	7–7	Lumen Field	Recap
16	December 24	at Tennessee Titans	**W** 20–17	8–7	Nissan Stadium	Recap
17	December 31	Pittsburgh Steelers	**L** 23–30	8–8	Lumen Field	Recap
18	January 7	at **Arizona Cardinals**	**W** 21–20	9–8	State Farm Stadium	Recap

Note: Intra-division opponents are in bold text.

=== Game summaries ===
==== Week 1: vs. Los Angeles Rams ====
Week 1: Los Angeles Rams at Seattle Seahawks – Game summary

Quarter	1	2	3	4	Total
**Rams**	7	0	10	13	**30**
Seahawks	3	10	0	0	**13**

at Lumen Field, Seattle, Washington

- Date: September 10
- Game time: 1:25 p.m. PDT
- Game weather: Mostly cloudy, 72 °F (22 °C)
- Game attendance: 68,683
- Referee: Shawn Smith
- TV announcers (Fox): Kevin Kugler, Mark Sanchez and Laura Okmin
- Recap, Game Book

Game information

**First quarter**

- SEA – Jason Myers 36-yard field goal, 9:52. Seahawks 3–0. **Drive: 12 plays, 57 yards, 5:08.**
- LAR – Kyren Williams 1-yard run (Brett Maher kick), 0:39. Rams 7–3. **Drive: 16 plays, 75 yards, 9:13.**

**Second quarter**

- SEA – DK Metcalf 10-yard pass from Geno Smith (Jason Myers kick), 9:16. Seahawks 10–7. **Drive: 12 plays, 75 yards, 6:23.**
- SEA – Jason Myers 42-yard field goal, 4:18. Seahawks 13–7. **Drive: 6 plays, 28 yards, 2:46.**

**Third quarter**

- LAR – Kyren Williams 7-yard run (Brett Maher kick), 8:56. Rams 14–13. **Drive: 10 plays, 76 yards, 6:04.**
- LAR – Brett Maher 38-yard field goal, 2:39. Rams 17–13. **Drive: 9 plays, 60 yards, 5:14.**

**Fourth quarter**

- LAR – Cam Akers 1-yard run (Brett Maher kick), 9:45. Rams 24–13. **Drive: 14 plays, 79 yards, 6:19.**
- LAR – Brett Maher 54-yard field goal, 4:57. Rams 27–13. **Drive: 9 plays, 40 yards, 4:12.**
- LAR – Brett Maher 45-yard field goal, 0:11. Rams 30–13. **Drive: 9 plays, 32 yards, 3:05.**

**Top passers**

- LAR – Matthew Stafford – 24/38, 334 yards
- SEA – Geno Smith – 16/26, 112 yards, TD

**Top rushers**

- LAR – Kyren Williams – 15 rushes, 52 yards, 2 TD
- SEA – Kenneth Walker III – 12 rushes, 64 yards

**Top receivers**

- LAR – Tutu Atwell – 6 receptions, 119 yards
- SEA – DK Metcalf – 3 receptions, 47 yards, TD

The Seahawks were favored to win the matchup against the division rival Los Angeles Rams, as they were looking to return to competition following an injury-plagued season the year prior. Seattle had managed an improbable season in 2022 as quarterback Geno Smith managed to play a major factor in the team returning to the postseason, winning NFL Comeback Player of the Year in the process, in addition to sweeping the Rams. The Rams' roster had also shown notable signs of decline with such offseason departures of players including Jalen Ramsey and Taylor Rapp. Seattle started the first half strong as the Rams' offense found minor difficulties in converting on first downs despite managing a touchdown from rookie running back Kyren Williams to finish the first quarter leading at 7–3. Seattle quickly responded with a touchdown catch from DK Metcalf, and a field goal to lead the game 13–7 by the half. During the first quarter, Metcalf began trading insults with the Rams' sidelines, leading him to land an illegal hit on Los Angeles' cornerback Ahkello Witherspoon after the play, infuriating Sean McVay after no flag was thrown. The Rams' secondary responded strongly in the second half, shutting out the Seahawks for the remainder of the game. Rams rookie receiver Puka Nacua managed an impressive performance for his rookie debut, making 10 catches for 119 yards. The Rams' running backs had also managed an impressive showing as Kyren Williams and Cam Akers combined for 81 yards and three touchdowns. The Rams' defense managed to lock Seattle's passing game as they failed to convert a first down within Rams territory for the remainder of the game. Two fourth-quarter field goals from Rams kicker Brett Maher would secure the victory 30–13 for the Rams, and the Seahawks fell to 0–1 on the season.

==== Week 2: at Detroit Lions ====
Week 2: Seattle Seahawks at Detroit Lions – Game summary

Quarter	1	2	3	4	OT	Total
**Seahawks**	7	0	10	14	6	**37**
Lions	7	7	7	10	0	**31**

at Ford Field, Detroit, Michigan

- Date: September 17
- Game time: 1:00 p.m. EDT/10:00 a.m. PDT
- Game weather: None (indoor stadium)
- Game attendance: 66,434
- Referee: Alex Kemp
- TV announcers (Fox): Kevin Burkhardt, Greg Olsen, Erin Andrews and Tom Rinaldi
- Recap, Game Book

Game information

**First quarter**

- SEA – Kenneth Walker III 1-yard run (Jason Myers kick), 7:04. Seahawks 7–0. **Drive: 12 plays, 75 yards, 7:56.**
- DET – Josh Reynolds 22-yard pass from Jared Goff (Riley Patterson kick), 3:49. Tied 7–7. **Drive: 7 plays, 75 yards, 3:15.**

**Second quarter**

- DET – Kalif Raymond 36-yard pass from Jared Goff (Riley Patterson kick), 4:51. Lions 14–7. **Drive: 5 plays, 65 yards, 2:46.**

**Third quarter**

- SEA – Kenneth Walker III 3-yard run (Jason Myers kick), 14:16. Tied 14–14. **Drive: 2 plays, 23 yards, 0:38.**
- DET – David Montgomery 4-yard run (Riley Patterson kick), 9:05. Lions 21–14. **Drive: 9 plays, 75 yards, 5:11.**
- SEA – Jason Myers 25-yard field goal, 3:27. Lions 21–17. **Drive: 12 plays, 61 yards, 5:38.**

**Fourth quarter**

- SEA – Tyler Lockett 3-yard pass from Geno Smith (Jason Myers kick), 10:38. Seahawks 24–21. **Drive: 9 plays, 45 yards, 4:49.**
- SEA – Tre Brown 40-yard interception return (Jason Myers kick), 8:04. Seahawks 31–21.
- DET – Josh Reynolds 4-yard pass from Jared Goff (Riley Patterson kick), 3:08. Seahawks 31–28. **Drive: 10 plays, 75 yards, 4:56.**
- DET – Riley Patterson 38-yard field goal, 0:00. Tied 31–31. **Drive: 6 plays, 30 yards, 1:44.**

**Overtime**

- SEA – Tyler Lockett 6-yard pass from Geno Smith (Jason Myers kick), 5:41. Seahawks 37–31. **Drive: 9 plays, 75 yards, 4:19.**

**Top passers**

- SEA – Geno Smith – 32/41, 328 yards, 2 TD
- DET – Jared Goff – 28/35, 323 yards, 3 TD, INT

**Top rushers**

- SEA – Kenneth Walker III – 17 rushes, 43 yards, 2 TD
- DET – David Montgomery – 16 rushes, 67 yards, TD

**Top receivers**

- SEA – DK Metcalf – 6 receptions, 75 yards
- DET – Amon-Ra St. Brown – 6 receptions, 102 yards

==== Week 3: vs. Carolina Panthers ====
Week 3: Carolina Panthers at Seattle Seahawks – Game summary

Quarter	1	2	3	4	Total
Panthers	3	10	0	14	**27**
**Seahawks**	3	9	10	15	**37**

at Lumen Field, Seattle, Washington

- Date: September 24
- Game time: 1:05 p.m. PDT
- Game weather: Cloudy, 61 °F (16 °C)
- Game attendance: 68,699
- Referee: Ronald Torbert
- TV announcers (CBS): Ian Eagle, Charles Davis and Evan Washburn
- Recap, Game Book

Game information

**First quarter**

- CAR – Eddy Piñeiro 47-yard field goal, 7:47. Panthers 3–0. **Drive: 11 plays, 50 yards, 5:38.**
- SEA – Jason Myers 43-yard field goal, 3:33. Tied 3–3. **Drive: 10 plays, 50 yards, 4:14.**

**Second quarter**

- SEA – Jason Myers 35-yard field goal, 12:07. Seahawks 6–3. **Drive: 8 plays, 64 yards, 4:03.**
- SEA – Jason Myers 33-yard field goal, 8:45. Seahawks 9–3. **Drive: 6 plays, 46 yards, 2:00.**
- CAR – D. J. Chark 47-yard pass from Andy Dalton (Eddy Piñeiro kick), 4:54. Panthers 10–9. **Drive: 8 plays, 75 yards, 3:51.**
- CAR – Eddy Piñeiro 44-yard field goal, 2:39. Panthers 13–9. **Drive: 4 plays, 2 yards, 1:37.**
- SEA – Jason Myers 37-yard field goal, 0:44. Panthers 13–12. **Drive: 11 plays, 54 yards, 1:55.**

**Third quarter**

- SEA – Jason Myers 39-yard field goal, 9:45. Seahawks 15–13. **Drive: 9 plays, 55 yards, 4:08.**
- SEA – Kenneth Walker III 1-yard run (Jason Myers kick), 3:52. Seahawks 22–13. **Drive: 8 plays, 55 yards, 4:17.**

**Fourth quarter**

- CAR – Miles Sanders 1-yard run (Eddy Piñeiro kick), 14:55. Seahawks 22–20. **Drive: 9 plays, 75 yards, 3:57.**
- SEA – Kenneth Walker III 7-yard run (Jason Myers kick), 11:40. Seahawks 29–20. **Drive: 6 plays, 69 yards, 3:15.**
- SEA – Jake Bobo 5-yard pass from Geno Smith (Geno Smith-Tyler Lockett pass), 4:17. Seahawks 37–20. **Drive: 5 plays, 27 yards, 0:30.**
- CAR – Adam Thielen 15-yard pass from Andy Dalton (Eddy Piñeiro kick), 1:40. Seahawks 37–27. **Drive: 11 plays, 75 yards, 2:37.**

**Top passers**

- CAR – Andy Dalton – 34/58, 361 yards, 2 TD
- SEA – Geno Smith – 23/36, 296 yards, TD, INT

**Top rushers**

- CAR – Miles Sanders – 9 rushes, 24 yards, TD
- SEA – Kenneth Walker III – 18 rushes, 97 yards, 2 TD

**Top receivers**

- CAR – Adam Thielen – 11 receptions, 145 yards, TD
- SEA – DK Metcalf – 6 receptions, 112 yards

==== Week 4: at New York Giants ====
Week 4: Seattle Seahawks at New York Giants – Game summary

Quarter	1	2	3	4	Total
**Seahawks**	7	7	7	3	**24**
Giants	0	3	0	0	**3**

at MetLife Stadium, East Rutherford, New Jersey

- Date: October 2
- Game time: 8:15 p.m. EDT/5:15 p.m. PDT
- Game weather: Fair, 67 °F (19 °C)
- Game attendance: 78,507
- Referee: Brad Rogers
- TV announcers (ESPN/ABC): Joe Buck, Troy Aikman and Lisa Salters
- Recap, Game Book

Game information

**First quarter**

- SEA – D. K. Metcalf 6-yard pass from Geno Smith (Jason Myers kick), 0:00. Seahawks 7–0. **Drive: 2 plays, 7 yards, 0:45.**

**Second quarter**

- NYG – Graham Gano 55-yard field goal, 3:05. Seahawks 7–3. **Drive: 12 plays, 61 yards, 6:11.**
- SEA – Kenneth Walker III 1-yard run (Jason Myers kick), 1:39. Seahawks 14–3. **Drive: 7 plays, 75 yards, 1:26.**

**Third quarter**

- SEA – Devon Witherspoon 97-yard interception return (Jason Myers kick), 1:03. Seahawks 21–3.

**Fourth quarter**

- SEA – Jason Myers 34-yard field goal, 5:26. Seahawks 24–3. **Drive: 6 plays, 29 yards, 3:00.**

**Top passers**

- SEA – Geno Smith – 13/20, 110 yards, TD
- NYG – Daniel Jones – 27/34, 203 yards, 2 INT

**Top rushers**

- SEA – Kenneth Walker – 17 rushes, 79 yards, TD
- NYG – Daniel Jones – 10 rushes, 66 yards

**Top receivers**

- SEA – Noah Fant – 2 receptions, 63 yards
- NYG – Matt Breida – 5 receptions, 48 yards

The win ensured the Seahawks of remaining perfect at MetLife Stadium, having never lost to the Giants and Jets, their NFL co-tenants.

==== Week 6: at Cincinnati Bengals ====
Week 6: Seattle Seahawks at Cincinnati Bengals – Game summary

Quarter	1	2	3	4	Total
Seahawks	7	3	3	0	**13**
**Bengals**	7	7	0	3	**17**

at Paycor Stadium, Cincinnati, Ohio

- Date: October 15
- Game time: 1:00 p.m. EDT/10:00 a.m. PDT
- Game weather: Cloudy, 57 °F (14 °C)
- Game attendance: 66,385
- Referee: Adrian Hill
- TV announcers (CBS): Ian Eagle, Charles Davis and Evan Washburn
- Recap, Game Book

Game information

**First quarter**

- SEA – Kenneth Walker III 1-yard run (Jason Myers kick), 8:38. Seahawks 7–0. **Drive: 11 plays, 75 yards, 6:22.**
- CIN – Tyler Boyd 8-yard pass from Joe Burrow (Evan McPherson kick), 2:22. Tied 7–7. **Drive: 13 plays, 69 yards, 6:16.**

**Second quarter**

- CIN – Andrei Iosivas 3-yard pass from Joe Burrow (Evan McPherson kick), 12:20. Bengals 14–7. **Drive: 7 plays, 73 yards, 3:22.**
- SEA – Jason Myers 55-yard field goal, 0:43. Bengals 14–10. **Drive: 9 plays, 42 yards, 2:45.**

**Third quarter**

- SEA – Jason Myers 23-yard field goal, 2:24. Bengals 14–13. **Drive: 8 plays, 38 yards, 3:18.**

**Fourth quarter**

- CIN – Evan McPherson 52-yard field goal, 11:47. Bengals 17–13. **Drive: 4 plays, 0 yards, 0:16.**

**Top passers**

- SEA – Geno Smith – 27/41, 323 yards, 2 INT
- CIN – Joe Burrow – 24/35, 185 yards, 2 TD, INT

**Top rushers**

- SEA – Kenneth Walker III – 19 rushes, 62 yards, TD
- CIN – Joe Mixon – 12 rushes, 38 yards

**Top receivers**

- SEA – Tyler Lockett – 6 receptions, 94 yards
- CIN – Ja'Marr Chase – 6 receptions, 80 yards

The Seahawks traveled to Cincinnati to face the reigning AFC North Champions on the road. Despite their defense holding Joe Burrow and the Bengals offense to three points from the end of the second quarter onwards, the Seahawks offense failed to find the end zone on all but their first red zone trips. As a result, the Seahawks were narrowly defeated 13–17 and fell to 3–2 on the season, while also failing to capture their first win in Cincinnati since 1993.

==== Week 7: vs. Arizona Cardinals ====
Week 7: Arizona Cardinals at Seattle Seahawks – Game summary

Quarter	1	2	3	4	Total
Cardinals	3	7	0	0	**10**
**Seahawks**	7	7	3	3	**20**

at Lumen Field, Seattle, Washington

- Date: October 22
- Game time: 1:05 p.m. PDT
- Game weather: Cloudy, 56 °F (13 °C)
- Game attendance: 68,781
- Referee: Scott Novak
- TV announcers (Fox): Kenny Albert, Jonathan Vilma and Shannon Spake
- Recap, Game Book

Game information

**First quarter**

- SEA – Jaxon Smith-Njigba 28-yard pass from Geno Smith (Jason Myers kick), 4:47. Seahawks 7-0. **Drive: 3 plays, 61 yards, 1:01.**
- ARI – Matt Prater 44-yard field goal, 1:57. Seahawks 7-3. **Drive: 4 plays, 4 yards, 1:22.**

**Second quarter**

- ARI – Joshua Dobbs 25-yard run (Matt Prater kick), 9:11. Cardinals 10-7. **Drive: 8 plays, 80 yards, 4:27.**
- SEA – Jake Bobo 18-yard pass from Geno Smith (Jason Myers kick), 4:41. Seahawks 14-10. **Drive: 9 plays, 76 yards, 4:30.**

**Third quarter**

- SEA – Jason Myers 21-yard field goal, 7:37. Seahawks 17-10. **Drive: 13 plays, 72 yards, 7:23.**

**Fourth quarter**

- SEA – Jason Myers 48-yard field goal, 2:17. Seahawks 20-10. **Drive: 9 plays, 25 yards, 2:41.**

**Top passers**

- ARI – Joshua Dobbs – 19/33, 146 yards
- SEA – Geno Smith – 18/24, 219 yards, 2 TD, INT

**Top rushers**

- ARI – Emari Demercado – 13 rushes, 58 yards
- SEA – Kenneth Walker III – 26 rushes, 105 yards

**Top receivers**

- ARI – Emari Demercado – 4 receptions, 17 yards
- SEA – Jaxon Smith-Njigba – 4 receptions, 63 yards, TD

==== Week 8: vs. Cleveland Browns ====
Week 8: Cleveland Browns at Seattle Seahawks – Game summary

Quarter	1	2	3	4	Total
Browns	7	7	6	0	**20**
**Seahawks**	17	0	0	7	**24**

at Lumen Field, Seattle, Washington

- Date: October 29
- Game time: 1:05 p.m. PDT
- Game weather: Sunny, 47 °F (8 °C)
- Game attendance: 68,807
- Referee: Bill Vinovich
- TV announcers (Fox): Adam Amin, Daryl Johnston and Pam Oliver
- Recap, Game Book

Game information

**First quarter**

- SEA – Jake Bobo 3-yard run (Jason Myers kick), 8:53. Seahawks 7–0. **Drive: 8 plays, 80 yards, 3:55.**
- SEA – Tyler Lockett 12-yard pass from Geno Smith (Jason Myers kick), 5:30. Seahawks 14–0. **Drive: 6 plays, 41 yards, 2:26.**
- CLE – David Njoku 18-yard pass from P. J. Walker (Dustin Hopkins kick), 3:22. Seahawks 14–7. **Drive: 4 plays, 75 yards, 2:08.**
- SEA – Jason Myers 32-yard field goal, 0:59. Seahawks 17–7. **Drive: 6 plays, 62 yards, 2:23.**

**Second quarter**

- CLE – Kareem Hunt 1-yard run (Dustin Hopkins kick), 4:40. Seahawks 17–14. **Drive: 11 plays, 67 yards, 5:15.**

**Third quarter**

- CLE – Dustin Hopkins 25-yard field goal, 7:29. Tied 17–17. **Drive: 10 plays, 76 yards, 5:49.**
- CLE – Dustin Hopkins 27-yard field goal, 2:50. Browns 20–17. **Drive: 9 plays, 30 yards, 4:05.**

**Fourth quarter**

- SEA – Jaxon Smith-Njigba 9-yard pass from Geno Smith (Jason Myers kick), 0:38. Seahawks 24–20. **Drive: 5 plays, 57 yards, 1:19.**

**Top passers**

- CLE – P. J. Walker – 15/31, 248 yards, TD, 2 INT
- SEA – Geno Smith – 23/37, 254 yards, 2 TD, 2 INT

**Top rushers**

- CLE – Kareem Hunt – 14 rushes, 55 yards, TD
- SEA – Kenneth Walker III – 8 rushes, 66 yards

**Top receivers**

- CLE – Amari Cooper – 6 receptions, 89 yards
- SEA – Tyler Lockett – 8 receptions, 81 yards, TD

==== Week 9: at Baltimore Ravens ====
Week 9: Seattle Seahawks at Baltimore Ravens – Game summary

Quarter	1	2	3	4	Total
Seahawks	0	3	0	0	**3**
**Ravens**	0	17	13	7	**37**

at M&T Bank Stadium, Baltimore, Maryland

- Date: November 5
- Game time: 1:00 p.m. EST/10:00 a.m. PST
- Game weather: Clear, 69 °F (21 °C)
- Game attendance: 70,753
- Referee: Shawn Hochuli
- TV announcers (CBS): Jim Nantz, Tony Romo and Tracy Wolfson
- Recap, Game Book

Game information

**First quarter**

- No scoring plays.

**Second quarter**

- BAL – Gus Edwards 4-yard run (Justin Tucker kick), 13:06. Ravens 7–0. **Drive: 12 play, 81 yards, 5:35.**
- BAL – Gus Edwards 3-yard run (Justin Tucker kick), 2:39. Ravens 14–0. **Drive: 10 play, 84 yards, 5:48.**
- SEA – Jason Myers 33-yard field goal, 0:59. Ravens 14–3. **Drive: 7 plays, 60 yards, 1:40.**
- BAL – Justin Tucker 37-yard field goal, 0:04. Ravens 17–3. **Drive: 5 plays, 17 yards, 0:29.**

**Third quarter**

- BAL – Justin Tucker 45-yard field goal, 12:44. Ravens 20–3. **Drive: 5 plays, 49 yards, 2:16.**
- BAL – Justin Tucker 31-yard field goal, 3:28. Ravens 23–3. **Drive: 13 plays, 48 yards, 7:48.**
- BAL – Keaton Mitchell 40-yard run (Justin Tucker kick), 0:29. Ravens 30–3. **Drive: 3 play, 60 yards, 1:23.**

**Fourth quarter**

- BAL – Odell Beckham Jr. 6-yard pass from Tyler Huntley (Justin Tucker kick), 8:14. Ravens 37–3. **Drive: 8 plays, 78 yards, 3:56.**

**Top passers**

- SEA – Geno Smith – 13/28, 157 yards, INT
- BAL – Lamar Jackson – 21/26, 187 yards

**Top rushers**

- SEA – Kenneth Walker III – 9 rushes, 16 yards
- BAL – Keaton Mitchell – 9 rushes, 138 yards, TD

**Top receivers**

- SEA – Jaxon Smith-Njigba – 6 reception, 63 yards
- BAL – Mark Andrews – 9 receptions, 80 yards

The loss to the Ravens was the second worst loss for the Seahawks under Pete Carroll, only eclipsed by a 42–7 loss to the Rams at home back in 2017. The Seahawks would later hire the Ravens defensive coordinator Mike Macdonald to be their head coach the following season.

==== Week 10: vs. Washington Commanders ====
Week 10: Washington Commanders at Seattle Seahawks – Game summary

Quarter	1	2	3	4	Total
Commanders	6	3	3	14	**26**
**Seahawks**	3	6	7	13	**29**

at Lumen Field, Seattle, Washington

- Date: November 12
- Game time: 1:25 p.m. PST
- Game weather: Cloudy, 52 °F (11 °C)
- Game attendance: 68,721
- Referee: Alex Kemp
- TV announcers (Fox): Kevin Kugler, Mark Sanchez and Laura Okmin
- Recap, Game Book

Game information

**First quarter**

- WAS – Brian Robinson Jr. 51-yard pass from Sam Howell (kick failed), 13:26. Commanders 6–0. **Drive: 4 play, 65 yards, 1:34.**
- SEA – Jason Myers 45-yard field goal, 8:43. Commanders 6–3. **Drive: 9 plays, 49 yards, 4:43.**

**Second quarter**

- WAS – Joey Slye 49-yard field goal, 12:06. Commanders 9–3. **Drive: 10 plays, 41 yards, 5:15.**
- SEA – Jason Myers 43-yard field goal, 9:12. Commanders 9–6. **Drive: 10 plays, 51 yards, 2:54.**
- SEA – Jason Myers 33-yard field goal, 1:47. Tied 9–9. **Drive: 10 plays, 54 yards, 3:02.**

**Third quarter**

- WAS – Joey Slye 47-yard field goal, 10:32. Commanders 12–9. **Drive: 6 plays, 41 yards, 2:24.**
- SEA – Kenneth Walker III 64-yard pass from Geno Smith (Jason Myers kick), 9:43. Seahawks 16–12. **Drive: 2 plays, 75 yards, 0:49.**

**Fourth quarter**

- SEA – Jason Myers 45-yard field goal, 12:14. Seahawks 19–12. **Drive: 11 plays, 55 yards, 4:47.**
- WAS – Antonio Gibson 19-yard pass from Sam Howell (Joey Slye kick), 8:00. Tied 19–19. **Drive: 8 plays, 73 yards, 4:14.**
- SEA – Tyler Lockett 5-yard pass from Geno Smith (Jason Myers kick), 3:49. Seahawks 26–19. **Drive: 10 plays, 75 yards, 4:13.**
- WAS – Dyami Brown 35-yard pass from Sam Howell (Joey Slye kick), 0:52. Tied 26–26. **Drive: 10 plays, 71 yards, 2:55.**
- SEA – Jason Myers 43-yard field goal, 0:00. Seahawks 29–26. **Drive: 7 plays, 50 yards, 0:52.**

**Top passers**

- WAS – Sam Howell – 29/44, 312 yards, 3 TD
- SEA – Geno Smith – 31/47, 369 yards, 2 TD

**Top rushers**

- WAS – Brian Robinson Jr. – 8 rushes, 38 yards
- SEA – Kenneth Walker III – 19 rushes, 63 yards

**Top receivers**

- WAS – Brian Robinson Jr. – 6 receptions, 119 yards, TD
- SEA – Tyler Lockett – 8 receptions, 92 yards, TD

==== Week 11: at Los Angeles Rams ====
Week 11: Seattle Seahawks at Los Angeles Rams – Game summary

Quarter	1	2	3	4	Total
Seahawks	7	6	3	0	**16**
**Rams**	0	7	0	10	**17**

at SoFi Stadium, Inglewood, California

- Date: November 19
- Game time: 1:25 p.m. PST
- Game weather: Sunny, 72 °F (22 °C) (fixed roof)
- Game attendance: 72,704
- Referee: Carl Cheffers
- TV announcers (CBS): Andrew Catalon, Tiki Barber, Matt Ryan and AJ Ross
- Recap, Game Book

Game information

**First quarter**

- SEA – DK Metcalf 8-yard pass from Geno Smith (Jason Myers kick), 5:20. Seahawks 7–0. **Drive: 14 plays, 88 yards, 7:46.**

**Second quarter**

- SEA – Jason Myers 54-yard field goal, 8:26. Seahawks 10–0. **Drive: 15 plays, 62 yards, 8:34.**
- SEA – Jason Myers 43-yard field goal, 4:48. Seahawks 13–0. **Drive: 6 plays, 43 yards, 3:06.**
- LAR – Puka Nacua 4-yard pass from Matthew Stafford (Lucas Havrisik kick), 0:09. Seahawks 13–7. **Drive: 9 plays, 75 yards, 4:39.**

**Third quarter**

- SEA – Jason Myers 52-yard field goal, 8:03. Seahawks 16–7. **Drive: 8 plays, 13 yards, 3:56.**

**Fourth quarter**

- LAR – Darrell Henderson 1-yard run (Lucas Havrisik kick), 7:38. Seahawks 16–14. **Drive: 9 plays, 68 yards, 4:45.**
- LAR – Lucas Havrisik 22-yard field goal, 1:31. Rams 17–16. **Drive: 14 plays, 75 yards, 5:12.**

**Top passers**

- SEA – Geno Smith – 22/34, 233 yards, TD
- LAR – Matthew Stafford – 17/31, 190 yards, TD, INT

**Top rushers**

- SEA – Zach Charbonnet – 15 rushes, 47 yards
- LAR – Royce Freeman – 17 rushes, 73 yards

**Top receivers**

- SEA – Zach Charbonnet – 6 receptions, 22 yards
- LAR – Puka Nacua – 5 receptions, 70 yards, TD

Seattle entered their second matchup against the rival Rams boasting a 6–3 record while the Rams struggled mightily as they limped into the game following three straight losses. Despite a lone touchdown to start the game; the Seahawks' offense became increasingly overwhelmed by the Rams' defense as they only managed two additional field goals to end the first half. Nearing the end of the third quarter; Geno Smith suffered a brutal tackle from Aaron Donald, that injured his elbow, forcing Seattle to play Drew Lock who played very poorly. Both sides continued to grow increasingly hostile with each other after rookie Cornerback Devon Witherspoon dealt a violent Suplex tackle on Rams wide receiver Austin Trammell. The Rams steadily cut the lead down to 2 points headed into the end of the fourth quarter, even managing a critical interception thrown by Lock. The Rams later took the lead by 1 point following a field goal, prompting Smith to return to the game for a possible drive despite his injured elbow. Desperate to regain the lead, Smith managed two desperate first down conversions to set up Jason Myers for a 55-yard field goal; as they attempted to retake the lead. A timeout was later called by Rams head coach Sean McVay in an effort to ice Myers' kick; proving to be successful when he missed the field goal as it sailed wide-right; ending the game in a crushing fashion as the Seahawks fell to the Rams in a sweep.

==== Week 12: vs. San Francisco 49ers ====
Thanksgiving Day games

Week 12: San Francisco 49ers at Seattle Seahawks – Game summary

Quarter	1	2	3	4	Total
**49ers**	7	17	0	7	**31**
Seahawks	3	0	10	0	**13**

at Lumen Field, Seattle, Washington

- Date: November 23
- Game time: 5:20 p.m. PST
- Game weather: Mostly sunny, 39 °F (4 °C)
- Game attendance: 68,702
- Referee: Tra Blake
- TV announcers (NBC): Mike Tirico, Cris Collinsworth and Melissa Stark
- Recap, Game Book

Game information

**First quarter**

- SF – Deebo Samuel 2-yard run (Jake Moody kick), 10:01. 49ers 7–0. **Drive: 9 plays, 71 yards, 4:59.**
- SEA – Jason Myers 51-yard field goal, 9:07. 49ers 7–3. **Drive: 4 plays, 1 yard, 0:54.**

**Second quarter**

- SF – Christian McCaffrey 1-yard run (Jake Moody kick), 13:11. 49ers 14–3. **Drive: 9 plays, 45 yards, 4:51.**
- SF – Christian McCaffrey 8-yard run (Jake Moody kick), 5:11. 49ers 21–3. **Drive: 8 plays, 58 yards, 3:59.**
- SF – Jake Moody 32-yard field goal, 0:39. 49ers 24–3. **Drive: 4 plays, 8 yards, 1:08.**

**Third quarter**

- SEA – Jordyn Brooks 12-interception return (Jason Myers kick), 11:23. 49ers 24–10.
- SEA – Jason Myers 30-yard field goal, 3:13. 49ers 24–13. **Drive: 14 plays, 78 yards, 6:28.**

**Fourth quarter**

- SF – Brandon Aiyuk 28-yard pass from Brock Purdy (Jake Moody kick), 7:51. 49ers 31–13. **Drive: 6 plays, 64 yards, 3:31.**

**Top passers**

- SF – Brock Purdy – 21/30, 209 yards, TD, INT
- SEA – Geno Smith – 18/27, 180 yards, INT

**Top rushers**

- SF – Christian McCaffrey – 19 rushes, 114 yards, 2 TD
- SEA – Zach Charbonnet – 14 rushes, 47 yards

**Top receivers**

- SF – Deebo Samuel – 7 receptions, 79 yards
- SEA – Jaxon Smith-Njigba – 2 receptions, 41 yards

==== Week 13: at Dallas Cowboys ====
Week 13: Seattle Seahawks at Dallas Cowboys – Game summary

Quarter	1	2	3	4	Total
Seahawks	7	14	7	7	**35**
**Cowboys**	10	10	7	14	**41**

at AT&T Stadium, Arlington, Texas

- Date: November 30
- Game time: 7:15 p.m. CST/5:15 p.m. PST
- Game weather: None (retractable roof closed)
- Game attendance: 93,367
- Referee: Clete Blakeman
- TV announcers (KCPQ/Prime Video): Al Michaels, Kirk Herbstreit and Kaylee Hartung
- Recap, Game Book

Game information

**First quarter**

- DAL – Brandon Aubrey 30-yard field goal, 9:10. Cowboys 3–0. **Drive: 14 plays, 63 yards, 5:50.**
- SEA – DK Metcalf 73-yard pass from Geno Smith (Jason Myers kick), 7:28. Seahawks 7–3. **Drive: 3 plays, 75 yards, 1:42.**
- DAL – CeeDee Lamb 15-yard pass from Dak Prescott (Brandon Aubrey kick), 4:48. Cowboys 10–7. **Drive: 5 plays, 75 yards, 2:40.**

**Second quarter**

- DAL – Brandin Cooks 7-yard pass from Dak Prescott (Brandon Aubrey kick), 11:37. Cowboys 17–7. **Drive: 11 plays, 68 yards, 4:21.**
- SEA – Zach Charbonnet 1-yard run (Jason Myers kick), 8:54. Cowboys 17–14. **Drive: 7 plays, 75 yards, 2:43.**
- DAL – Brandon Aubrey 31-yard field goal, 1:30. Cowboys 20–14. **Drive: 16 plays, 62 yards, 7:24.**
- SEA – DK Metcalf 1-yard pass from Geno Smith (Jason Myers kick), 0:04. Seahawks 21–20. **Drive: 8 plays, 75 yards, 1:26.**

**Third quarter**

- SEA – Geno Smith 5-yard run (Jason Myers kick), 10:01. Seahawks 28–20. **Drive: 10 plays, 75 yards, 4:59.**
- DAL – Tony Pollard 6-yard run (Brandon Aubrey kick), 3:41. Seahawks 28–27. **Drive: 12 plays, 75 yards, 6:20.**

**Fourth quarter**

- SEA – DK Metcalf 3-yard pass from Geno Smith (Jason Myers kick), 14:17. Seahawks 35–27. **Drive: 5 plays, 70 yards, 1:47.**
- DAL – Brandon Aubrey 38-yard field goal, 11:23. Seahawks 35–30. **Drive: 6 plays, 56 yards, 2:54.**
- DAL – Jake Ferguson 12-yard pass from Dak Prescott (Dak Prescott–Brandin Cooks pass), 4:37. Cowboys 38–35. **Drive: 7 plays, 54 yards, 2:27.**
- DAL – Brandon Aubrey 32-yard field goal, 1:43. Cowboys 41–35. **Drive: 6 plays, 35 yards, 1:28.**

**Top passers**

- SEA – Geno Smith – 23/41, 334 yards, 3 TD, INT
- DAL – Dak Prescott – 29/41, 299 yards, 3 TD

**Top rushers**

- SEA – Zach Charbonnet – 19 rushes, 60 yards, TD
- DAL – Tony Pollard – 20 rushes, 68 yards, TD

**Top receivers**

- SEA – Jaxon Smith-Njigba – 7 receptions, 62 yards
- DAL – CeeDee Lamb – 12 receptions, 116 yards, TD

==== Week 14: at San Francisco 49ers ====
Week 14: Seattle Seahawks at San Francisco 49ers – Game summary

Quarter	1	2	3	4	Total
Seahawks	10	0	6	0	**16**
**49ers**	7	7	7	7	**28**

at Levi's Stadium, Santa Clara, California

- Date: December 10
- Game time: 1:05 p.m. PST
- Game weather: Sunny, 63 °F (17 °C)
- Game attendance: 71,816
- Referee: Brad Rogers
- TV announcers (Fox): Kevin Burkhardt, Greg Olsen, Erin Andrews and Tom Rinaldi
- Recap, Game Book

Game information

**First quarter**

- SF – Jordan Mason 3-yard run (Jake Moody kick), 14:03. 49ers 7–0. **Drive: 2 plays, 75 yards, 0:57.**
- SEA – DK Metcalf 31-yard pass from Drew Lock (Jason Myers kick), 9:44. Tied 7–7. **Drive: 8 plays, 75 yards, 4:19.**
- SEA – Jason Myers 40-yard field goal, 0:56. Seahawks 10–7. **Drive: 7 plays, 50 yards, 3:52.**

**Second quarter**

- SF – Deebo Samuel 54-yard pass from Brock Purdy (Jake Moody kick), 8:18. 49ers 14–10. **Drive: 5 plays, 83 yards, 2:54.**

**Third quarter**

- SF – Deebo Samuel 1-yard run (Jake Moody kick), 1:58. 49ers 21–10. **Drive: 7 plays, 75 yards, 4:00.**
- SEA – Colby Parkinson 25-yard pass from Drew Lock (pass failed), 0:24. 49ers 21–16. **Drive: 3 plays, 78 yards, 1:34.**

**Fourth quarter**

- SF – George Kittle 44-yard pass from Brock Purdy (Jake Moody kick), 14:08. 49ers 28–16. **Drive: 3 plays, 75 yards, 1:16.**

**Top passers**

- SEA – Drew Lock – 22/31, 269 yards, 2 TD, 2 INT
- SF – Brock Purdy – 19/27, 368 yards, 2 TD, INT

**Top rushers**

- SEA – Zach Charbonnet – 9 rushes, 44 yards
- SF – Christian McCaffrey – 16 rushes, 145 yards

**Top receivers**

- SEA – Tyler Lockett – 6 receptions, 89 yards
- SF – Deebo Samuel – 7 receptions, 149 yards, TD

==== Week 15: vs. Philadelphia Eagles ====
Week 15: Philadelphia Eagles at Seattle Seahawks – Game summary

Quarter	1	2	3	4	Total
Eagles	7	3	7	0	**17**
**Seahawks**	0	3	7	10	**20**

at Lumen Field, Seattle, Washington

- Date: December 18
- Game time: 5:15 p.m. PST
- Game weather: Drizzle, 46 °F (8 °C)
- Game attendance: 68,758
- Referee: Clay Martin
- TV announcers (ESPN/ABC): Joe Buck, Troy Aikman and Lisa Salters
- Recap, Game Book

Game information

**First quarter**

- PHI – Jalen Hurts 3-yard run (Jake Elliott kick), 6:31. Eagles 7–0. **Drive: 15 plays, 75 yards, 8:29.**

**Second quarter**

- PHI – Jake Elliott 27-yard field goal, 6:20. Eagles 10–0. **Drive: 16 plays, 63 yards, 8:26.**
- SEA – Jason Myers 26-yard field goal, 1:42. Eagles 10–3. **Drive: 12 plays, 67 yards, 4:38.**

**Third quarter**

- SEA – Kenneth Walker III 23-yard run (Jason Myers kick), 10:05. Tied 10–10. **Drive: 9 plays, 75 yards, 4:55.**
- PHI – Jalen Hurts 1-yard run (Jake Elliott kick), 4:43. Eagles 17–10. **Drive: 12 plays, 75 yards, 5:22.**

**Fourth quarter**

- SEA – Jason Myers 43-yard field goal, 10:00. Eagles 17–13. **Drive: 11 plays, 45 yards, 6:26.**
- SEA – Jaxon Smith-Njigba 29-yard pass from Drew Lock (Jason Myers kick), 0:28. Seahawks 20–17. **Drive: 10 plays, 94 yards, 1:24.**

**Top passers**

- PHI – Jalen Hurts – 17/31, 143 yards, 2 INT
- SEA – Drew Lock – 22/33, 208 yards, TD

**Top rushers**

- PHI – Jalen Hurts – 13 rushes, 82 yards, 2 TD
- SEA – Kenneth Walker III – 19 rushes, 86 yards, TD

**Top receivers**

- PHI – A. J. Brown – 5 receptions, 56 yards
- SEA – DK Metcalf – 5 receptions, 78 yards

With the Seahawks down 13–17 with just 1:52 left in the game, Drew Lock, who was starting place for the injured Geno Smith led a 92-yard touchdown drive concluding with a 29-yard touchdown throw to Jaxon Smith-Njigba with just 0:28 left. The Seahawks picked off Jalen Hurts on the next drive to seal the win and improve to 7–7. With the win, the Seahawks increased their winning streak over the Eagles to eight—including the teams' 2019 postseason meeting.

==== Week 16: at Tennessee Titans ====
Week 16: Seattle Seahawks at Tennessee Titans – Game summary

Quarter	1	2	3	4	Total
**Seahawks**	0	3	3	14	**20**
Titans	0	10	0	7	**17**

at Nissan Stadium, Nashville, Tennessee

- Date: December 24
- Game time: 12:00 p.m. CST/10:00 a.m. PST
- Game weather: Cloudy, 64 °F (18 °C)
- Game attendance: 60,181
- Referee: Shawn Smith
- TV announcers (CBS): Andrew Catalon, Tiki Barber, Matt Ryan and AJ Ross
- Recap, Game Book

Game information

**First quarter**

- No scoring plays.

**Second quarter**

- TEN – Chig Okonkwo 12-yard pass from Derrick Henry (Nick Folk kick), 14:14. Titans 7–0. **Drive: 6 plays, 57 yards, 3:10.**
- SEA – Jason Myers 28-yard field goal, 10:48. Titans 7–3. **Drive: 7 plays, 60 yards, 3:26.**
- TEN – Nick Folk 33-yard field goal, 3:18. Titans 10–3. **Drive: 12 plays, 60 yards, 7:30.**

**Third quarter**

- SEA – Jason Myers 27-yard field goal, 9:53. Titans 10–6. **Drive: 10 plays, 46 yards, 5:07.**

**Fourth quarter**

- SEA – DK Metcalf 11-yard pass from Geno Smith (Jason Myers kick), 12:10. Seahawks 13–10. **Drive: 10 plays, 96 yards, 6:33.**
- TEN – Derrick Henry 2-yard run (Nick Folk kick), 3:21. Titans 17–13. **Drive: 15 plays, 75 yards, 8:49.**
- SEA – Colby Parkinson 5-yard pass from Geno Smith (Jason Myers kick), 0:57. Seahawks 20–17. **Drive: 14 plays, 75 yards, 2:24.**

**Top passers**

- SEA – Geno Smith – 25/36, 227 yards, 2 TD
- TEN – Ryan Tannehill – 18/26, 152 yards

**Top rushers**

- SEA – Kenneth Walker III – 16 rushes, 54 yards
- TEN – Derrick Henry – 19 rushes, 88 yards, TD

**Top receivers**

- SEA – Tyler Lockett – 8 receptions, 81 yards
- TEN – Chig Okonkwo – 6 receptions, 63 yards, TD

==== Week 17: vs. Pittsburgh Steelers ====
Week 17: Pittsburgh Steelers at Seattle Seahawks – Game summary

Quarter	1	2	3	4	Total
**Steelers**	7	10	7	6	**30**
Seahawks	0	14	3	6	**23**

at Lumen Field, Seattle, Washington

- Date: December 31
- Game time: 1:05 p.m. PST
- Game weather: Partly cloudy, 47 °F (8 °C)
- Game attendance: 68,735
- Referee: Shawn Hochuli
- TV announcers (Fox): Kenny Albert, Jonathan Vilma and Shannon Spake
- Recap, Game Book

Game information

**First quarter**

- PIT – Jaylen Warren 18-yard run (Chris Boswell kick), 1:47. Steelers 7–0. **Drive: 14 plays, 80 yards, 7:57.**

**Second quarter**

- SEA – Kenneth Walker III 13-yard run (Jason Myers kick), 13:50. Tied 7–7. **Drive: 7 plays, 75 yards, 2:57.**
- PIT – Chris Boswell 39-yard field goal, 10:27. Steelers 10–7. **Drive: 6 plays, 54 yards, 3:23.**
- SEA – Jaxon Smith-Njigba 12-yard pass from Geno Smith (Jason Myers kick), 5:30. Seahawks 14–10. **Drive: 8 plays, 75 yards, 4:57.**
- PIT – Najee Harris 9-yard run (Chris Boswell kick), 1:36. Steelers 17–14. **Drive: 9 plays, 75 yards, 3:54.**

**Third quarter**

- SEA – Jason Myers 43-yard field goal, 10:47. Tied 17–17. **Drive: 9 plays, 41 yards, 4:13.**
- PIT – Najee Harris 4-yard run (Chris Boswell kick), 6:57. Steelers 24–17. **Drive: 6 plays, 71 yards, 3:50.**

**Fourth quarter**

- SEA – Jason Myers 42-yard field goal, 13:30. Steelers 24–20. **Drive: 7 plays, 62 yards, 2:40.**
- PIT – Chris Boswell 26-yard field goal, 7:07. Steelers 27–20. **Drive: 13 plays, 65 yards, 6:23.**
- PIT – Chris Boswell 21-yard field goal, 4:31. Steelers 30–20. **Drive: 6 plays, 13 yards, 2:29.**
- SEA – Jason Myers 24-yard field goal, 2:01. Steelers 30–23. **Drive: 11 plays, 69 yards, 2:30.**

**Top passers**

- PIT – Mason Rudolph – 18/24, 274 yards
- SEA – Geno Smith – 23/33, 290 yards, TD

**Top rushers**

- PIT – Najee Harris – 27 rushes, 122 yards, 2 TD
- SEA – Kenneth Walker III – 10 rushes, 53 yards, TD

**Top receivers**

- PIT – George Pickens – 7 receptions, 131 yards
- SEA – DK Metcalf – 5 receptions, 106 yards

==== Week 18: at Arizona Cardinals ====
Week 18: Seattle Seahawks at Arizona Cardinals – Game summary

Quarter	1	2	3	4	Total
**Seahawks**	3	10	0	8	**21**
Cardinals	0	6	7	7	**20**

at State Farm Stadium, Glendale, Arizona

- Date: January 7
- Game time: 2:25 p.m. MST/1:25 p.m. PST
- Game weather: None (retractable roof closed)
- Game attendance: 63,197
- Referee: Adrian Hill
- TV announcers (Fox): Kevin Kugler, Mark Sanchez and Laura Okmin
- Recap, Game Book

=== Standings ===
==== Division ====
NFC West
	W	L	T	PCT	DIV	CONF	PF	PA	STK
^{(1)} San Francisco 49ers	12	5	0	.706	5–1	10–2	491	298	L1
^{(6)} Los Angeles Rams	10	7	0	.588	5–1	8–4	404	377	W4
Seattle Seahawks	9	8	0	.529	2–4	7–5	364	402	W1
Arizona Cardinals	4	13	0	.235	0–6	3–9	330	455	L1

==== Conference ====
NFC
#	Team	Division	W	L	T	PCT	DIV	CONF	SOS	SOV	STK
**Division leaders**
1 (Note: San Francisco finished ahead of Dallas and Detroit based on conference record, claiming the No. 1 seed.)	San Francisco 49ers	West	12	5	0	.706	5–1	10–2	.509	.475	L1
2 (Note: Dallas claimed the No. 2 seed over Detroit based on head-to-head victory.)	Dallas Cowboys	East	12	5	0	.706	5–1	9–3	.446	.392	W2
3	Detroit Lions	North	12	5	0	.706	4–2	8–4	.481	.436	W1
4 (Note: Tampa Bay finished ahead of New Orleans in the NFC South based on common record. (Tampa Bay is 8–4 against Minnesota, Chicago, Detroit, Green Bay, Atlanta, Carolina, Houston, Tennessee, Jacksonville, and Indianapolis, while New Orleans is 6–6 against the same teams.))	Tampa Bay Buccaneers	South	9	8	0	.529	4–2	7–5	.481	.379	W1
**Wild cards**
5	Philadelphia Eagles	East	11	6	0	.647	4–2	7–5	.481	.476	L2
6	Los Angeles Rams	West	10	7	0	.588	5–1	8–4	.529	.453	W4
7 (Note: Green Bay and Seattle finished ahead of New Orleans based on conference record.) (Note: Green Bay finished ahead of Seattle based on strength of victory, claiming the 7th and final playoff spot.)	Green Bay Packers	North	9	8	0	.529	4–2	7–5	.474	.458	W3
**Did not qualify for the postseason**
8	Seattle Seahawks	West	9	8	0	.529	2–4	7–5	.512	.392	W1
9	New Orleans Saints	South	9	8	0	.529	4–2	6–6	.433	.340	W2
10 (Note: Minnesota finished ahead of Atlanta based on head-to-head victory. Division tie break was initially used to eliminate Chicago (see below).) (Note: Minnesota finished ahead of Chicago based on common record. (Minnesota is 5–7 against Tampa Bay, Los Angeles Chargers, Carolina, Kansas City, Green Bay, Atlanta, New Orleans, Denver, Las Vegas, and Detroit, while Chicago is 4–8 against the same teams.))	Minnesota Vikings	North	7	10	0	.412	2–4	6–6	.509	.454	L4
11 (Note: Chicago finished ahead of Atlanta based on head-to-head victory.)	Chicago Bears	North	7	10	0	.412	2–4	6–6	.464	.370	L1
12	Atlanta Falcons	South	7	10	0	.412	3–3	4–8	.429	.462	L2
13	New York Giants	East	6	11	0	.353	3–3	5–7	.512	.353	W1
14 (Note: Washington finished ahead of Arizona based on head-to-head victory.)	Washington Commanders	East	4	13	0	.235	0–6	2–10	.512	.338	L8
15	Arizona Cardinals	West	4	13	0	.235	0–6	3–9	.561	.588	L1
16	Carolina Panthers	South	2	15	0	.118	1–5	1–11	.522	.500	L3
**Tiebreakers** (Note: When breaking ties for three or more teams under the NFL's rules, they are first broken within divisions, then comparing only the highest-ranked remaining team from each division.)
