= Julian Love =

American football player (born 1998)

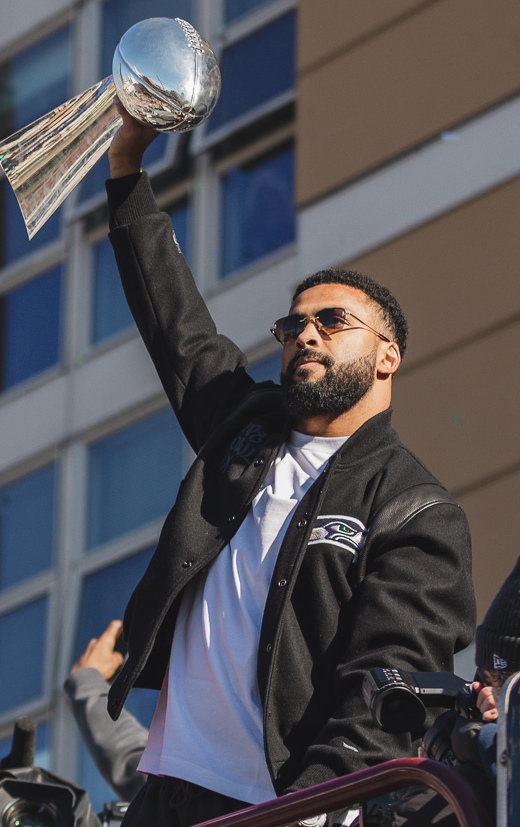
- Love holding the Vince Lombardi Trophy in 2026

No. 20 – Seattle Seahawks
- Position: Strong safety
- Roster status: Active

Personal information
- Born: March 19, 1998 (age 28); Westchester, Illinois, U.S.
- Listed height: 5 ft 11 in (1.80 m)
- Listed weight: 195 lb (88 kg)

Career information
- High school: Nazareth Academy (La Grange Park, Illinois)
- College: Notre Dame (2016–2018)
- NFL draft: 2019: 4th round, 108th overall pick

Career history
- New York Giants (2019–2022); Seattle Seahawks (2023–present)

Awards and highlights
- Super Bowl champion (LX); Pro Bowl (2023); Consensus All-American (2018)

Career NFL statistics as of Week 6, 2026
- Total tackles: 580
- Sacks: 2.5
- Forced fumbles: 6
- Fumble recoveries: 4
- Pass deflections: 52
- Interceptions: 15
- Stats at Pro Football Reference

Julian Love (born March 19, 1998) is an American professional football strong safety for the Seattle Seahawks of the National Football League (NFL). He played college football for the Notre Dame Fighting Irish.

== Early life ==
Love attended Nazareth Academy in La Grange Park, Illinois. As a senior in 2015, he was the Chicago Sun-Times Football Player of the Year after recording 92 tackles on defense and 1,067 rushing yards and 18 touchdowns on offense. Love committed to the University of Notre Dame to play college football.

== College career ==
As a true freshman at Notre Dame in 2016, Love played in 12 games with eight starts and recorded 45 tackles and one interception. As a sophomore in 2017, he started all 13 games, recording 68 tackles and three interceptions. Love returned as a starter his junior year in 2018. On January 4, 2019, Love announced that he would forgo his final year of eligibility and declare for the 2019 NFL draft.

== Professional career ==
On January 4, 2019, Love released a statement on his Instagram to officially announce his decision to forgo his senior season at Notre Dame to enter the 2019 NFL Draft. He was ranked as the third cornerback in the draft by NFL media analyst Todd McShay and was ranked the fourth best cornerback by NFL draft analyst Mel Kiper Jr.

External videos
- Breakdown of Love's College Highlights

Pre-draft measurables
Height	Weight	Arm length	Hand span	Wingspan	40-yard dash	10-yard split	20-yard split	20-yard shuttle	Three-cone drill	Vertical jump	Broad jump	Bench press
5 ft 10 3/4 in (1.80 m)	195 lb (88 kg)	31 3/4 in (0.81 m)	9 in (0.23 m)	6 ft 3 3/8 in (1.91 m)	4.50 s	1.59 s	2.57 s	4.10 s	6.72 s	36.0 in (0.91 m)	10 ft 1 in (3.07 m)	14 reps
All values from NFL Combine/Pro Day

=== New York Giants ===
External videos
- Giants select Julian Love 108th overall
- Love gets a call from Pat Shurmur

The New York Giants selected Love in the fourth round (108th overall) of the 2019 NFL draft. Love was the 10th safety drafted in 2019.

"I love that pick, I don’t understand how he dropped to the fourth round. I think he’s a steal. From my time being around the football team and watching every Notre Dame game, he is always around the ball. In this defense, I think that bodes well."

— Justin Tuck, who was also a Giants' mid-round draft pick out of Notre Dame

==== 2019 season ====
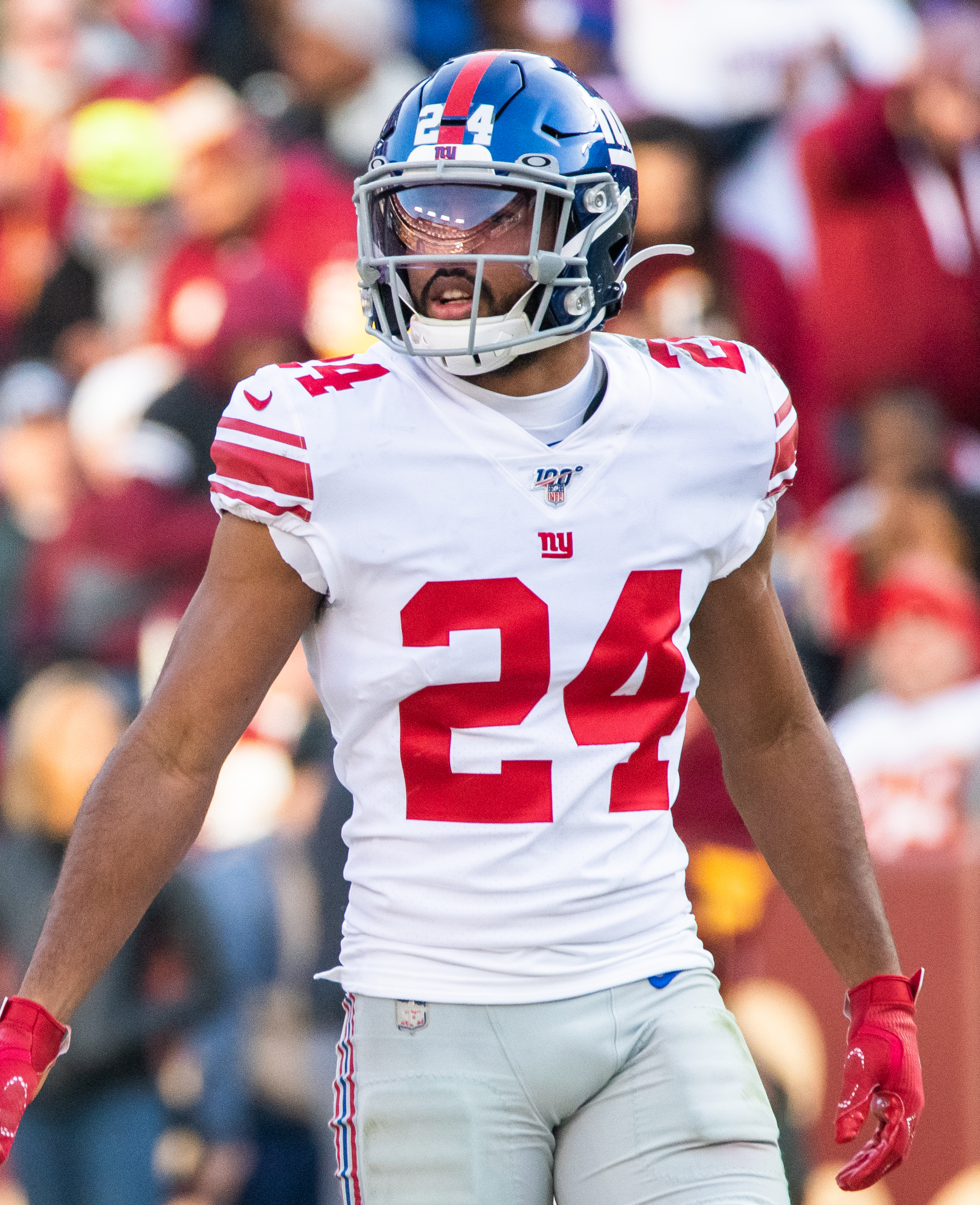
Love with the New York Giants in 2019

On May 2, 2019, the New York Giants signed Love to a four–year, $3.29 million contract that includes an initial signing bonus of $779,860.

During rookie training camp, defensive coordinator James Bettcher began having Love learn to play free safety with the aide of starting free safety Antoine Bethea. He continued to play cornerback, free safety, and nickelback in training camp and competed against Grant Haley to be the primary slot cornerback while also competing to be the backup free safety against Michael Thomas. Head coach Pat Shurmur named Love the third free safety on the depth chart to begin the regular season, behind starter Antoine Bethea and backup Sean Chandler.

On September 8, 2019, Love made his professional regular season debut in a 27–35 loss at the Dallas Cowboys. On November 24, 2019, Love made a solo tackle, deflected a pass, and returned his first career interception thrown by Mitchell Trubisky for a 30-yard return during the Giants' 19–14 loss at the Chicago Bears. In Week 14, Love earned his first career start in place of starting strong safety Jabrill Peppers and collected seven combined tackles (four solo) in a 13–31 loss at the Green Bay Packers. On December 29, 2019, he recorded a season-high nine combined tackles (eight solo), made two tackles for-a-loss, and a pass deflection in a 17–34 loss to the Philadelphia Eagles. He finished his rookie season in 2019 with a total of 37 combined tackles (30 solo), five tackles for-a-loss, three pass deflections, a forced fumble, and an interception in 13 games and five starts.

The New York Giants finished the 2019 NFL season with a 4–12 record and did not qualify for the playoffs. On December 30, 2019, the New York Giants fired head coach Pat Shurmur and his coaching staff.

==== 2020 season ====
On January 8, 2020, the New York Giants announced the hiring of former New England Patriots' special teams coordinator Joe Judge as their new head coach. He competed to be the starting free safety against rookie Xavier McKinney. Defensive coordinator Patrick Graham named Love and Jabrill Peppers the starting safety duo to begin the regular season.

In Week 2, Love recorded five combined tackles (four solo), a pass deflection, and made his first interception of the season by a pass attempt coincidentally thrown by Mitchell Trubisky in a 17–13 loss at the Chicago Bears. On September 27, 2020, he collected a season-high 12 combined tackles (10 solo) as the Giants lost 9–36 to the San Francisco 49ers. Head coach Pat Shurmur chose to replace Love as the starting free safety with free agent acquisition Logan Ryan starting in Week 4. He finished the season with a total of 64 combined tackles (45 solo), three pass deflections, a tackle for-a-loss, and an interception in 16 games and four starts. The New York Giants finished second in the NFC East, but missed the playoffs with a 6–10 record.

==== 2021 season ====
He entered training camp slated as a backup as Logan Ryan and Jabrill Peppers were entrenched as the starting safeties. He competed against Xavier McKinney to be the primary backup up safety and nickelback. Head coach Joe Judge named him a backup safety to begin the regular season. On November 1, 2021, Love made two combined tackles (one solo), broke up a pass, and had his only interception of the season on a pass thrown by Patrick Mahomes to wide receiver Josh Gordon during a 17–20 loss at the Kansas City Chiefs. In Week 11, he made six combined tackles (three solo) and a season-high two pass deflections during a 10–30 loss at the Tampa Bay Buccaneers. On December 19, 2021, Love collected a season-high 11 combined tackles (eight solo) during a 6–21 loss at the Dallas Cowboys. He finished the 2021 NFL season with a total of 66 combined tackles (36 solo), seven pass deflections, and one interception while appearing in all 17 games with five starts.

==== 2022 season ====
On January 28, 2022, the New York Giants hired Buffalo Bills' offensive coordinator Brian Daboll as their new head coach after Joe Judge was terminated after a 4–13 record. Following the departures of Jabrill Peppers and Logan Ryan, defensive coordinator Don Martindale held a competition between Love, Xavier McKinney, Jason Pinnock, and Tony Jefferson to determine the starting safeties. Love was named the starting strong safety to start the season, alongside free safety Xavier McKinney.

On September 26, 2022, Love collected a career-high 14 combined tackles (four solo) during a 16–23 loss to the Dallas Cowboys. On October 16, 2022, he made six combined tackles (three solo), a season-high two pass deflections, and intercepted pass by Lamar Jackson to fullback Patrick Ricard which led to the game-winning touchdown during a 24–20 victory against the Baltimore Ravens. In Week 13, Love made a season-high 11 solo tackles (13 combined) during a 20–20 tie against the Washington Commanders. He was inactive as a healthy scratch for a Week 18 loss to the Green Bay Packers as Brian Daboll chose to rest his starters. He finished the season with a total of 124 combined tackles (79 solo), five pass deflections, two interceptions, and one sack in 17 games and 16 starts. Pro Football Focus had Love earn an overall grade of 66.7 in 2022 and he received a coverage grade of 70.9.

The New York Giants finished third in the NFC East with a 9–7–1 record and earned a spot as a Wildcard. On January 15, 2023, Love started in his first career playoff appearance and made four combined tackles (two solo) during a 31–24 victory at the Minnesota Vikings in the NFC Wild Card Game. On January 21, 2023, he collected eight solo tackles during a 7–38 loss at the Philadelphia Eagles in the Divisional Round.

=== Seattle Seahawks ===
On March 17, 2023, the Seattle Seahawks signed Love to a two–year, $12.00 million contract that includes $5.98 million guaranteed and an initial signing bonus of $4.82 million.

==== 2023 season ====
During training camp, he competed against Jerrick Reed and Coby Bryant to be the starting strong safety as Jamal Adams was still recovering from his injury. Head coach Pete Carroll named Love the starting strong safety to begin the season, alongside free safety Quandre Diggs. Prior to Week 4, Love was demoted to the primary backup safety and nickelback after Jamal Adams returned to take over his starting role.

External videos
- Love tracks Hurts deep TD pass for INT
- Julian Love 2024 Pro Bowler
- Top 100 Players 2024: No. 85 Julian Love

In Week 8 of the 2023 season against the Cleveland Browns, Love intercepted a pass thrown by P. J. Walker that led to the game-winning touchdown as the Seahawks won 24–20. Love returned to his starting role in Week 14 after Jamal Adams injured his knee and was subsequently placed on injured reserve for the last four games of the season. On December 18, 2023, Love made nine combined tackles (six solo), a season-high tying two pass deflections, and a career-high two interceptions on passes thrown by Jalen Hurts in the fourth quarter which led to the Seahawks' winning the game 20–17 against the Philadelphia Eagles. He was named National Football Conference Defensive Player of the Week. In Week 17, Love collected a season-high 14 combined tackles (ten solo) during a 23–30 loss to the Pittsburgh Steelers. He finished the season with 123 combined tackles (85 solo), ten pass deflections, four interceptions, two forced fumbles, and a fumble recovery in 17 games and 12 starts. He was ranked 95th by his fellow players on the NFL Top 100 Players of 2024. He was selected to play in the 2024 Pro Bowl. He received a career-high overall grade of 72.8 from Pro Football Focus and received a coverage grade of 80.4. PFF ranked him as the 28th best safety heading into 2024.

==== 2024 season ====
On January 31, 2024, the Seattle Seahawks hired Baltimore Ravens' defensive coordinator Mike Macdonald as their head coach to replace Pete Carroll. Following the departures of Jamal Adams and Quandre Diggs via free agency, both starting safety roles became available. Defensive coordinator Aden Durde retained Love as a starter with the other role being competed for by Rayshawn Jenkins, K'Von Wallace, and Coby Bryant. Head coach Mike Macdonald named Love the starting free safety to begin the season, alongside Rayshawn Jenkins.

On July 24, 2024, the Seattle Seahawks signed Love to a three–year, $36.00 million contract extension that includes $13.16 million guaranteed and an initial signing bonus of $10.50 million. With one–year remaining from his previous contract, he will not enter free agency until after the 2027 NFL season.

External videos
- Julian Love INTs Bo Nix TD attempt
- Week 7: Julian Love INTs Kirk Cousins

On September 8, 2024, Love started in the Seattle Seahawks' home-opener against the Denver Broncos and collected a season-high 12 combined tackles (ten solo), broke up a pass, forced a fumble, and had the first career interception thrown by rookie Bo Nix to wide receiver Courtland Sutton during a 26–20 victory. In Week 18, he made six combined tackles (four solo), a season-high three pass deflections, and intercepted a pass by Jimmy Garoppolo during a 30–25 victory at the Los Angeles Rams. He started all 17 games in 2024 and finished with a total of 109 combined tackles (79 solo), 12 pass deflections, three interceptions, two forced fumbles, and one fumble recovery.

==== 2025 season ====
Love began the 2025 season as one of Seattle's starting safeties. After suffering a hamstring injury in Week 4 against the Arizona Cardinals, Love was placed on injured reserve after missing four subsequent games on November 1, 2025. He was activated on December 6, ahead of the team's Week 14 matchup against the Atlanta Falcons.

Love intercepted a fourth quarter pass from Drake Maye in Seattle's 29–13 victory over the New England Patriots in Super Bowl LX.

== NFL career statistics ==
Legend
	Won the Super Bowl
**Bold**	Career high

=== Regular season ===
Year	Team	Games		Tackles					Interceptions					Fumbles				
Year	Team	GP	GS	Cmb	Solo	Ast	Sck	TFL	Int	Yds	Lng	TD	PD	FF	Fmb	FR	Yds	TD
2019	NYG	15	5	37	30	7	0.0	5	1	30	**30**	0	3	1	0	0	0	0
2020	NYG	16	6	64	47	17	0.0	1	1	13	13	0	3	0	0	0	0	0
2021	NYG	**17**	5	66	36	30	0.5	1	1	0	0	0	7	0	0	**1**	-3	0
2022	NYG	16	16	**124**	79	**45**	**1.0**	**6**	2	**44**	27	0	5	1	0	**1**	**8**	0
2023	SEA	**17**	12	123	**85**	38	0.0	1	**4**	7	7	0	**10**	**2**	0	**1**	3	0
2024	SEA	**17**	**17**	109	79	30	0.0	3	3	33	26	0	2	**2**	0	**1**	6	0
2025	SEA	8	8	34	23	11	**1.0**	1	1	26	26	0	6	0	0	0	0	0
2026	SEA	5	5	23	15	8	0.0	2	2	0	0	0	6	0	0	0	0	0
Career		111	74	580	394	186	2.5	20	15	153	30	0	52	6	0	4	14	0

=== Postseason ===
Year	Team	Games		Tackles					Interceptions					Fumbles				
Year	Team	GP	GS	Cmb	Solo	Ast	Sck	TFL	Int	Yds	Lng	TD	PD	FF	Fmb	FR	Yds	TD
2022	NYG	2	2	**1**2	**10**	2	0.0	**2**	0	0	0	0	0	0	0	0	0	0
2025	SEA	**3**	**3**	9	6	**3**	0.0	0	**1**	**35**	**35**	0	**1**	0	0	**1**	**1**	0
Career		5	5	21	16	5	0.0	2	1	35	35	0	1	0	0	1	1	0

== Personal life ==
Love is of partial Cuban and Mexican descent.
