= 2024 Pro Bowl Games =

National Football League all-star games

NFC	AFC
64	59
Head coach: Eli Manning	Head coach: Peyton Manning
- Date: February 1 and 4, 2024
- Stadium: Hawk's Landing Golf Club, Orlando, Florida, Nicholson Fieldhouse, University of Central Florida, Orlando, Florida, and Camping World Stadium, Orlando, Florida
- Offensive MVP: Baker Mayfield (Tampa Bay Buccaneers)
- Defensive MVP: Demario Davis (New Orleans Saints)

Ceremonies
- National anthem: Craig Morgan

TV in the United States
- Network: ESPN; ABC; Disney XD; ESPN+ ESPN Deportes; NFL+
- Announcers: Scott Van Pelt (play–by–play), Dan Orlovsky (color), Marcus Spears, Ryan Clark, and Michelle Beisner-Buck (sideline reporters)

The 2024 Pro Bowl Games were the National Football League all-star game for the 2023 NFL season. This was the second year that the event consisted of skills competitions and a non-contact flag football game rather than an actual tackle football game. The first block of skills competitions took place on February 1, 2024, around various venues in Central Florida, while the flag football game and the other events took place on February 4 at Camping World Stadium in Orlando, Florida. Fan voting began on November 27, 2023, and ended on December 25. The rosters were then announced on January 3, 2024. The AFC dominated the flag football game 50–34; however, they lost the game as the NFC was even more dominant in the skills competitions (30–9). The final score was 64 NFC and 59 AFC.

== Background ==
The NFL announced on July 25, 2023, that Camping World Stadium in Orlando, Florida would be the site for the game after spending the last two years at Allegiant Stadium in Paradise, Nevada. Prior to Allegiant Stadium's two years, Camping World Stadium hosted the Pro Bowl from 2017 to 2020 (no game was held in 2021). The 2024 pro bowl “games” had its lowest TV rating since 2006.

== Format ==
The format consisted of various skill competition events and a 7-on-7 flag football game, with the first block of events having been held on February 1, 2024. On February 4, the remainder of the event program took place at Camping World Stadium.

On December 20, 2023, the league announced the skills competitions for both days, with a tug of war added to the program. The Closest to the Pin golf accuracy competition replaced the Longest Drive. The High Stakes event replaced the Lightning Round, reducing the previous year's three-part challenge to just the competition where players attempt to catch punts. In addition, the Madden NFL Head-to-Head event, in which two players from each conference play the Madden NFL video game using the Pro Bowl rosters, counted as part of the skill competitions instead of just being an exhibition event for the past few years.

== Rosters ==
The fan voting ran between November 27 and December 25, 2023. The final rosters were then announced on January 3, 2024.

=== AFC ===
Offense
Position	Starter(s)	Reserve(s)	Alternate(s)
Quarterback	1 Tua Tagovailoa, Miami	8 Lamar Jackson, Baltimore^{[d]} 15 Patrick Mahomes, Kansas City^{[c]}	7 C. J. Stroud, Houston^{[a]} 15 Gardner Minshew, Indianapolis^{[a]}
Running back	31 Raheem Mostert, Miami	4 James Cook, Buffalo; 22 Derrick Henry, Tennessee	
Fullback	30 Alec Ingold, Miami		
Wide receiver	10 Tyreek Hill, Miami; 2 Amari Cooper, Cleveland^{[b]}	13 Keenan Allen, LA Chargers; 1 Ja'Marr Chase, Cincinnati	14 Stefon Diggs, Buffalo^{[a]}
Tight end	87 Travis Kelce, Kansas City^{[c]}	85 David Njoku, Cleveland	17 Evan Engram, Jacksonville^{[a]}
Offensive tackle	78 Laremy Tunsil, Houston; 73 Dion Dawkins, Buffalo	72 Terron Armstead, Miami	
Offensive guard	56 Quenton Nelson, Indianapolis; 75 Joel Bitonio, Cleveland^{[b]}	62 Joe Thuney, Kansas City^{[c]}	77 Wyatt Teller, Cleveland^{[a]} 70 Kevin Zeitler, Baltimore^{[a]}
Center	52 Creed Humphrey, Kansas City^{[c]}	64 Tyler Linderbaum, Baltimore	78 Ryan Kelly, Indianapolis^{[a]}

Defense
Position	Starter(s)	Reserve(s)	Alternates(s)
Defensive end	95 Myles Garrett, Cleveland; 98 Maxx Crosby, Las Vegas^{[b]}	91 Trey Hendrickson, Cincinnati	51 Will Anderson Jr., Houston^{[a]}
Defensive tackle	95 Chris Jones, Kansas City^{[c]} 95 Quinnen Williams, NY Jets	92 Justin Madubuike, Baltimore	99 DeForest Buckner, Indianapolis^{[a]}
Outside linebacker	90 T. J. Watt, Pittsburgh^{[b]} 52 Khalil Mack, LA Chargers^{[b]}	41 Josh Allen, Jacksonville	6 Jeremiah Owusu-Koramoah, Cleveland^{[a]} 11 Jermaine Johnson II, NY Jets^{[a]}
Inside / middle linebacker	0 Roquan Smith, Baltimore	6 Patrick Queen, Baltimore	
Cornerback	2 Patrick Surtain II, Denver; 1 Sauce Gardner, NY Jets	5 Jalen Ramsey, Miami; 21 Denzel Ward, Cleveland	
Free safety	31 Justin Simmons, Denver	39 Minkah Fitzpatrick, Pittsburgh	
Strong safety	14 Kyle Hamilton, Baltimore		

Special teams
Position	Starter	Alternate(s)
Long snapper	46 Ross Matiscik, Jacksonville	
Punter	6 A. J. Cole III, Las Vegas	
Placekicker	9 Justin Tucker, Baltimore	
Return specialist	19 Marvin Mims, Denver	
Special teams	28 Miles Killebrew, Pittsburgh	

bold player who participated in the game
italics signifies a rookie
(C) signifies the player has been selected as a captain
^{a} Replacement player selection due to an injury or vacancy
^{b} Injured player; selected but did not participate
^{c} Selected but did not play because his team advanced to Super Bowl LVIII (see Pro Bowl "Player Selection" section)
^{d} Selected but chose not to participate

=== NFC ===
Offense
Position	Starter(s)	Reserve(s)	Alternate(s)
Quarterback	13 Brock Purdy, San Francisco^{[c]}	4 Dak Prescott, Dallas^{[d]} 9 Matthew Stafford, LA Rams^{[d]}	1 Jalen Hurts, Philadelphia^{[a]} 6 Baker Mayfield, Tampa Bay^{[a]} 7 Geno Smith, Seattle^{[a]}
Running back	23 Christian McCaffrey, San Francisco^{[c]}	0 D'Andre Swift, Philadelphia; 23 Kyren Williams, LA Rams	26 Jahmyr Gibbs, Detroit^{[a]}
Fullback	44 Kyle Juszczyk, San Francisco^{[c]}		30 C. J. Ham, Minnesota^{[a]}
Wide receiver	88 CeeDee Lamb, Dallas; 11 A. J. Brown, Philadelphia^{[b]}	13 Mike Evans, Tampa Bay^{[d]} 17 Puka Nacua, LA Rams	14 Amon-Ra St. Brown, Detroit^{[a]} 14 DK Metcalf, Seattle^{[a]}
Tight end	85 George Kittle, San Francisco^{[c]}	87 Sam LaPorta, Detroit	87 Jake Ferguson, Dallas^{[a]}
Offensive tackle	71 Trent Williams, San Francisco^{[c]} 65 Lane Johnson, Philadelphia	58 Penei Sewell, Detroit	78 Tristan Wirfs, Tampa Bay^{[a]}
Offensive guard	70 Zack Martin, Dallas^{[b]} 63 Chris Lindstrom, Atlanta	69 Landon Dickerson, Philadelphia	73 Tyler Smith, Dallas^{[a]}
Center	62 Jason Kelce, Philadelphia	77 Frank Ragnow, Detroit^{[b]}	78 Erik McCoy, New Orleans^{[a]}

Defense
Position	Starter(s)	Reserve(s)	Alternate(s)
Defensive end	97 Nick Bosa, San Francisco^{[c]} 98 Montez Sweat, Chicago	97 Aidan Hutchinson, Detroit	90 DeMarcus Lawrence, Dallas^{[a]}
Defensive tackle	99 Aaron Donald, LA Rams^{[b]} 97 Dexter Lawrence, NY Giants	98 Javon Hargrave, San Francisco^{[c]}	95 Derrick Brown, Carolina^{[a]} 97 Kenny Clark, Green Bay^{[a]}
Outside linebacker	11 Micah Parsons, Dallas; 99 Danielle Hunter, Minnesota	7 Haason Reddick, Philadelphia	
Inside / middle linebacker	54 Fred Warner, San Francisco^{[c]}	54 Bobby Wagner, Seattle	56 Demario Davis, New Orleans^{[a]}
Cornerback	26 DaRon Bland, Dallas; 7 Charvarius Ward, San Francisco^{[c]}	33 Jaylon Johnson, Chicago; 21 Devon Witherspoon, Seattle	2 Darius Slay, Philadelphia^{[a]}
Free safety	3 Jessie Bates, Atlanta		
Strong safety	3 Budda Baker, Arizona	20 Julian Love, Seattle	

Special teams
Position	Starter	Alternate(s)
Long snapper	42 Andrew DePaola, Minnesota	
Punter	5 Bryan Anger, Dallas	
Placekicker	17 Brandon Aubrey, Dallas	
Return specialist	22 Rashid Shaheed, New Orleans	
Special teams	42 Jalen Reeves-Maybin, Detroit^{[d]}	44 Nick Bellore, Seattle^{[a]}

bold player who participated in the game
italics signifies a rookie
(C) signifies the player has been selected as a captain
^{a} Replacement player selection due to an injury or vacancy
^{b} Injured player; selected but did not participate
^{c} Selected but did not play because his team advanced to Super Bowl LVIII (see Pro Bowl "Player selection" section)
^{d} Selected but chose not to participate

== Number of selections per team ==
American Football Conference
Team	Selections
Baltimore Ravens	8
Buffalo Bills	3
Cincinnati Bengals	2
Cleveland Browns	7
Denver Broncos	3
Houston Texans	3
Indianapolis Colts	4
Jacksonville Jaguars	3
Kansas City Chiefs	5
Las Vegas Raiders	2
Los Angeles Chargers	2
Miami Dolphins	6
New England Patriots	0
New York Jets	3
Pittsburgh Steelers	3
Tennessee Titans	1

National Football Conference
Team	Selections
Arizona Cardinals	1
Atlanta Falcons	2
Carolina Panthers	1
Chicago Bears	2
Dallas Cowboys	10
Detroit Lions	7
Green Bay Packers	1
Los Angeles Rams	4
Minnesota Vikings	3
New Orleans Saints	3
New York Giants	1
Philadelphia Eagles	8
San Francisco 49ers	9
Seattle Seahawks	6
Tampa Bay Buccaneers	3
Washington Commanders	0

== Schedule and results ==
The first set of skills competitions were held on Thursday, February 1, 2024, at Nicholson Fieldhouse at the University of Central Florida. The second set were held on Sunday, February 4 at Camping World Stadium.

=== Thursday ===
==== Precision Passing ====
Precision Passing was an accuracy competition in which each quarterback from both conferences attempts to hit as many targets as possible in one minute.

Opening Round

C. J. Stroud and Baker Mayfield both advanced to the final round with the two highest scores in the opening round.

Pos	Player	Team	Score
1	C. J. Stroud	HOU	26
2	Baker Mayfield	TB	24
3	Gardner Minshew	IND	21
4	Geno Smith	SEA	20
5	Jalen Hurts	PHI	17
6	Tua Tagovailoa	MIA	16

Final Round

Baker Mayfield won the event for the NFC with a score of 9.

Pos	Player	Team	Score
1	Baker Mayfield	TB	9
2	C. J. Stroud	HOU	8

Conference	Score
AFC	0
NFC	3

==== High Stakes ====
High Stakes was a multi-round competition in which players attempted to catch the most punts from a JUGS machine, without dropping other balls. This event replaced the Lightning Round completion from the previous year.

Miles Killebrew won the event for the AFC after catching a punt while holding 5 other footballs (6 footballs total).

Conference	Score
AFC	3
NFC	3

==== Closest to the Pin ====
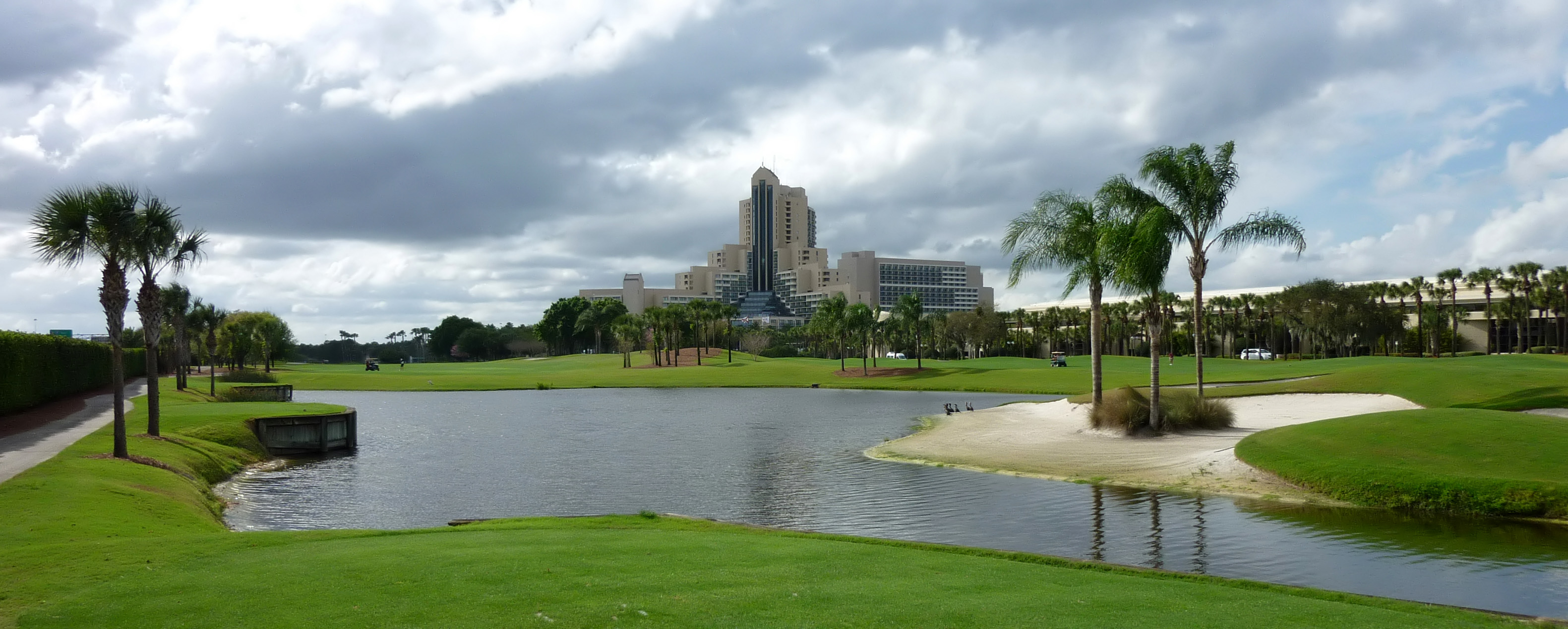
The Closest to the Pin event was held at the 18th hole of the Hawk's Landing Golf Club at the Orlando World Center Marriott Hotel

Closest to the Pin was a golf accuracy competition in which six players from each conference attempted to drive a golf ball to as close to the hole as possible (this event replaced the Longest Drive competition from the previous year). This was a pre-recorded segment held at the par-3, 18th hole of the Hawk's Landing Golf Course at the Orlando World Center Marriott Hotel.

Bryan Anger (NFC) won the event on his second attempt with a shot that landed 2 feet from the hole.

Conference	Score
AFC	3
NFC	6

==== Snap Shots ====
In Snap Shots, long snappers and centers snapped balls at various targets with different sizes and point values.

The NFC won the event, scoring 14 points over the AFC's 10. Andrew DePaola led the NFC with 9 points.

Conference	Score
AFC	3
NFC	9

==== Dodgeball ====
Dodgeball was played by 4 teams of five players representing defensive and offensive selections from each conference. The event took place over two games that were both counted for points.

The AFC offense defeated the NFC defense in the first game, while the NFC offense defeated the AFC defense in the second game, earning three points for each conference.

Conference	Score
AFC	6
NFC	12

=== Sunday ===
==== Kick-Tac-Toe ====
Each team's kicker played a version of tic-tac-toe where they kicked balls towards a giant board. The AFC won the event

Conference	Score
AFC	9
NFC	12

==== Flag Football First Quarter ====
The first quarter of the game was played. The AFC outscored the NFC 12–7.

Conference	Score
AFC	21
NFC	19

==== Move the Chains ====
Move the Chains was a race competed by teams of five players from each conference. They first had to move 3000 pounds of weight off of a wall, and then pull that 2,000-pound wall across the finish line. This game was held between the first and second quarters of the flag football game. The NFC won the event.

Conference	Score
AFC	21
NFC	22

==== Flag Football Second Quarter ====
The second quarter of the game was played. The AFC outscored the NFC 26–14.

Conference	Score
AFC	47
NFC	36

==== Madden NFL Head-to-Head ====
Two players from each conference played the Madden NFL 24 video game using the official Pro Bowl rosters. This event counted as part of the skill competitions this season instead of just being an exhibition event for the past few years. The actual game was played live on Saturday, February 3, and streamed on YouTube and Twitch. Highlights were then shown during halftime of the flag football game, with the results being added to the overall game score. The NFC team of Puka Nacua (1H) and Micah Parsons (2H) of the NFC defeated David Njoku (1H) and Tyreek Hill (2H) of the AFC, 36–15.

Conference	Score
AFC	47
NFC	39

==== Gridiron Gauntlet (race 1) ====
Six players from each conference competed in a relay race through an obstacle course (two races were played). The first race was held during halftime after the Madden NFL score was added. The NFC won the race.

Conference	Score
AFC	47
NFC	42

==== Best Catch ====
In Best Catch, Puka Nacua (NFC) and David Njoku (AFC), were shown in pre-recorded segments on Thursday doing special catches around various Orlando landmarks with Puka successfully catching a football thrown from a pier in a pond at Nona Adventure park while being towed behind a boat in waterskis in his second attempt and Njoku failing to catch a football thrown from a boat while performing a backflip dive off a rope swing into a pool at Evermore Orlando Resort across three attempts. A fan vote was run to determine who had the best catches, with the results announced on Sunday and the points added during halftime between the two Gridiron Gauntlet games. Puka Nacua was voted as the winner.

Conference	Score
AFC	47
NFC	45

==== Gridiron Gauntlet (race 2) ====
Six players from each conference competed in a relay race through an obstacle course (two races were played). The second race was held during halftime after the Best Catch game. The NFC won the race.

Conference	Score
AFC	47
NFC	48

==== Flag Football Third Quarter ====
The third quarter of the game was played. The NFC outscored the AFC 7–6.

Conference	Score
AFC	53
NFC	55

==== Tug-of-war ====
Tug-of-war made its debut this season, played by five players from each conference (this game was played as a best of three series with the team winning the series earning three points). The NFC won in a 2–0 sweep, earning three points.

Conference	Score
AFC	53
NFC	58

==== Flag Football Fourth Quarter ====
The fourth quarter of the game was played. Both teams scored 6 points each.

Conference	Score
AFC	59
NFC	64

=== Overall score ===
One game of flag football with four 12-minute quarters was played, with Sunday's skill events held between quarters.

Conference	Events	1st Quarter	Events	2nd Quarter	Events	3rd Quarter	Events	4th Quarter	Final
AFC	9	12	0	26	0	6	0	6	59
NFC	12	7	3	14	12	7	3	6	64

== Broadcasting ==
ESPN and ABC had the rights to the Pro Bowl Games. ESPN and ESPN+ aired the Thursday events live while ABC aired the recording of the block on the Saturday after the event, while ESPN, ABC, Disney XD and ESPN+ aired the Sunday events live. ESPN Deportes and NFL+ aired all events as well.
