= Erik McCoy =

American football player (born 1997)

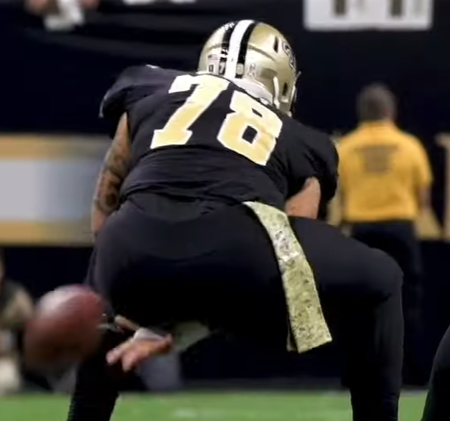
- McCoy with the New Orleans Saints in 2019

No. 78 – New Orleans Saints
- Position: Center
- Roster status: Active

Personal information
- Born: August 27, 1997 (age 29); San Antonio, Texas, U.S.
- Listed height: 6 ft 4 in (1.93 m)
- Listed weight: 303 lb (137 kg)

Career information
- High school: Lufkin (Lufkin, Texas)
- College: Texas A&M (2015–2018)
- NFL draft: 2019: 2nd round, 48th overall pick

Career history
- New Orleans Saints (2019–present)

Awards and highlights
- 2× Pro Bowl (2023, 2024); PFWA All-Rookie Team (2019)

Career NFL statistics as of Week 4, 2026
- Games played: 92
- Games started: 92
- Stats at Pro Football Reference

Erik Christopher McCoy (born August 27, 1997) is an American professional football center for the New Orleans Saints of the National Football League (NFL). He played college football for the Texas A&M Aggies.

== Early life ==
McCoy attended Lufkin High School in Lufkin, Texas. He committed to Texas A&M University to play college football.

== College career ==
After redshirting his first year at Texas A&M in 2015, McCoy became a starter his redshirted freshman year in 2016 and started all 38 games during his career. After his junior year in 2018, he entered the 2019 NFL draft.

== Professional career ==
Pre-draft measurables
Height	Weight	Arm length	Hand span	Wingspan	40-yard dash	10-yard split	20-yard split	20-yard shuttle	Three-cone drill	Vertical jump	Broad jump	Bench press
6 ft 3 7/8 in (1.93 m)	303 lb (137 kg)	33 in (0.84 m)	9 5/8 in (0.24 m)	6 ft 5 3/4 in (1.97 m)	4.89 s	1.72 s	2.85 s	4.62 s	8.28 s	31 in (0.79 m)	8 ft 11 in (2.72 m)	29 reps
All values from NFL Combine

McCoy was selected by the New Orleans Saints in the second round (48th overall) of the 2019 NFL draft. The Saints traded up with the Miami Dolphins to draft McCoy. He was named to the PFWA All-Rookie Team.

In the 2021 season opener against the Green Bay Packers, McCoy left the game after suffering a calf injury in the first quarter. He missed the next four games until he returned in the Week 7 win over the Seattle Seahawks.

On September 8, 2022, McCoy signed a five-year, $63.75 million contract extension with the Saints.

McCoy was placed on injured reserve on November 12, 2022. He was designated to return from injured reserve on December 14, 2022, and activated for Week 15.

McCoy was selected to replace Frank Ragnow in the 2024 Pro Bowl Games.

McCoy missed seven games in the 2024 season after undergoing surgery for a groin injury. He made 7 starts for New Orleans, playing 70% of the team's offensive snaps. On December 28, 2024, McCoy was placed on injured reserve with an elbow injury, ending his season.

McCoy started all seven games he appeared in for New Orleans in 2025. On October 21, 2025, McCoy was placed on injured reserve after suffering a torn biceps in the team's Week 7 14–26 loss against the Chicago Bears.
