= Devon Witherspoon =

American football player (born 2000)

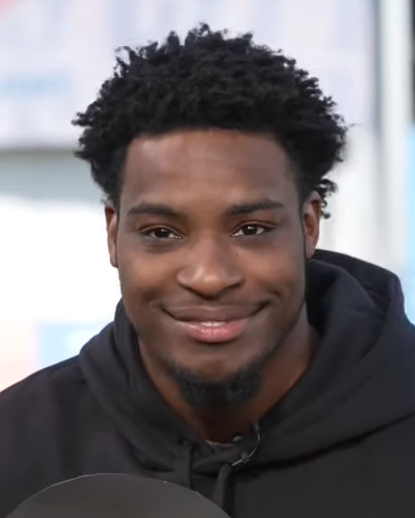
- Witherspoon in 2023

No. 21 – Seattle Seahawks
- Position: Cornerback
- Roster status: Active

Personal information
- Born: December 11, 2000 (age 25); Pensacola, Florida, U.S.
- Listed height: 6 ft 0 in (1.83 m)
- Listed weight: 185 lb (84 kg)

Career information
- High school: Pine Forest (Pensacola)
- College: Illinois (2019–2022)
- NFL draft: 2023: 1st round, 5th overall pick

Career history
- Seattle Seahawks (2023–present)

Awards and highlights
- Super Bowl champion (LX); Second-team All-Pro (2025); 3× Pro Bowl (2023–2025); Seattle Seahawks Top 50 players; PFWA All-Rookie Team (2023); Consensus All-American (2022); Big Ten Defensive Back of the Year (2022); First-team All-Big Ten (2022)

Career NFL statistics as of Week 10, 2026
- Total tackles: 309
- Sacks: 6.5
- Forced fumbles: 2
- Fumble recoveries: 1
- Pass deflections: 35
- Interceptions: 2
- Defensive touchdowns: 1
- Stats at Pro Football Reference

Devon Marquis Witherspoon (born December 11, 2000) is an American professional football cornerback for the Seattle Seahawks of the National Football League (NFL). He played college football for the Illinois Fighting Illini, where he was named the Big Ten Defensive Back of the Year in 2022. Witherspoon was selected by the Seahawks fifth overall in the 2023 NFL draft, and won Super Bowl LX in his third season with the team.

== Early life ==
Devon Witherspoon attended Pine Forest High School in Pensacola, Florida. Initially concentrating his athletic abilities on basketball, Witherspoon did not begin playing football until his junior year of high school. As a senior in 2018, he was the Pensacola News Journal Defensive Player of the Year after recording 74 tackles, seven interceptions and two touchdowns. He committed to play college football at the University of Illinois Urbana-Champaign.

== College career ==
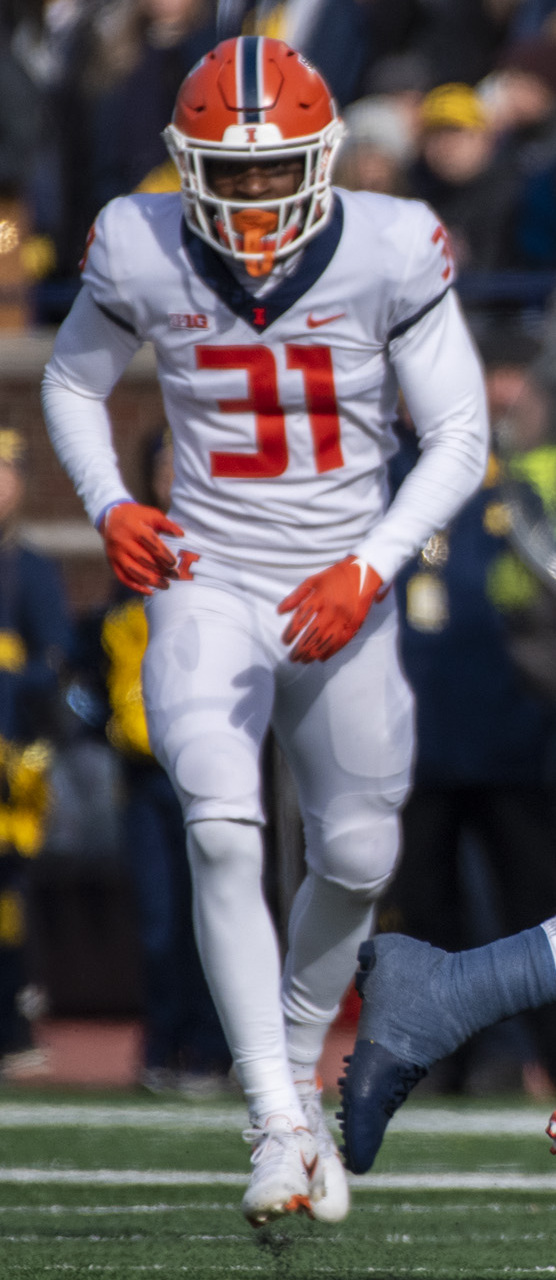
Witherspoon with Illinois in 2022

Witherspoon was the only true freshman to start on defense for the Illinois Fighting Illini in 2019. He wound up playing in every game, making 33 tackles. As a sophomore in 2020, he recorded 33 tackles and two interceptions.

He played and started 10 games his junior year in 2021, finishing with 52 tackles and one sack. Witherspoon returned to Illinois his senior year in 2022, beginning the year as the Big Ten Conference leader in passes defended.

A supremely confident player, Witherspoon was regarded as the leading trash-talker on the Fighting Illini team during his tenure. When asked about the biggest talkers on the squad, offensive teammate Isaiah Williams joked that "Spoon is number one. Spoon is at one and then we go to like five."

"I gotta talk, it's just me. I can't live without doing it," Witherspoon acknowledged.

During his senior year Witherspoon was named one of twelve finalists for the Jim Thorpe Award, presented to the nation's top defensive back. He was selected as the 2022 Tatum–Woodson Defensive Back of the Year, an award given to the top defensive back in the Big Ten Conference, and was named a consensus All-American at the season's conclusion.

== Professional career ==
Pre-draft measurables
Height	Weight	Arm length	Hand span	Wingspan	40-yard dash	10-yard split	20-yard split
5 ft 11 1/2 in (1.82 m)	181 lb (82 kg)	31 1/4 in (0.79 m)	8 7/8 in (0.23 m)	6 ft 1 5/8 in (1.87 m)	4.45 s	1.58 s	2.55 s
All values from NFL Combine/Pro Day

=== 2023 ===
The Seattle Seahawks selected Witherspoon fifth overall in the 2023 NFL draft, with the pick having been acquired as part of the blockbuster Russell Wilson trade. He notably became the third of five defensive backs drafted from the same Illinois secondary spanning from 2018–2020, including Nate Hobbs (2021), Kerby Joseph (2022), Quan Martin, and Sydney Brown (2023). He was the first cornerback to be selected in 2023 and became the highest defensive back to be selected from Illinois, surpassing Vontae Davis (2009). He also became the fourth highest draft pick from Illinois since 1967, only after Jeff George (1st/1990), Kevin Hardy (2nd/1996), and Simeon Rice (3rd/1996).

On July 28, 2023, the Seattle Seahawks signed Witherspoon to a fully-guaranteed four–year, $31.86 million rookie contract that includes an initial signing bonus of $20.17 million.

He entered training camp slated as the de facto No. 1 starting cornerback under defensive coordinator Clint Hurtt. Head coach Pete Carroll named him the No. 1 starting cornerback to begin the season and paired him with Tariq Woolen.

On August 7, 2023, Witherspoon injured his hamstring during practice and subsequently missed the entire preseason and the Seahawks' week 1 season-opener against the Los Angeles Rams. On September 17, 2023, Witherspoon made his professional regular season debut and earned his first career start, recording five combined tackles (three solo) and broke up one pass during a 37–31 overtime victory at the Detroit Lions. The following week, he set a season-high with 11 combined tackles (eight solo) and recorded two pass deflections as the Seahawks defeated the Carolina Panthers 37–27 in week 3. On October 2, 2023, Witherspoon made seven combined tackles (six solo), a pass deflection, set a career-high with two sacks, and returned his first career interception for his first career touchdown during a 24–3 victory at the New York Giants. He had his first career touchdown on a pick-six after intercepting a pass by Daniel Jones to wide receiver Parris Campbell and returned it 97 yards for a touchdown. It became the second-longest pick-six in franchise history, second to a 98-yard pick-six by Bobby Wagner in (2018). That same game, Witherspoon became the third rookie in NFL history to record 2.0+ sacks and a pick-six in a single game, along with Todd Shell and Andy Katzenmoyer, and the first player, rookie or not, to record both 2.0+ sacks and a 95+ yard pick six in a game since sacks became an official stat in 1982. His performance earned him NFC Defensive Player of the Week. In week 10, he recorded five combined tackles (four solo) and tied his season-high of three pass deflections during a 13–31 loss to the San Francisco 49ers. Following a hip injury, Witherspoon would remain inactive for two games (Weeks 15–16). He finished his rookie season with 79 combined tackles (56 solo), 16 pass deflections, three sacks, one interception, one forced fumble, and a touchdown in 14 games and 13 starts. He was named to the PFWA NFL All-Rookie Team. He earned Pro Bowl honors.

=== 2024 ===
On January 31, 2024, the Seattle Seahawks announced the hiring of Baltimore Ravens' defensive coordinator Mike Macdonald as their head coach following the departure of Pete Carroll. Witherspoon returned to training camp as the de facto No. 1 starting cornerback under the Seahawks' new defensive coordinator Aden Durde. He was named a starting cornerback to begin the season, alongside Tariq Woolen.

In week 11, he set a season-high with eight combined tackles (three solo) and set a new season-high with three pass deflections during a 20–17 victory at the San Francisco 49ers. On December 26, 2024, he recorded six solo tackles and had his lone sack of the season on Caleb Williams during a 6–3 win at the Chicago Bears. The following week, he tied his season-high of eight combined tackles (four solo) and made two pass break ups during a 30–25 victory at the Los Angeles Rams. He started all 17 games throughout the 2024 NFL season and finished with a total of 98 combined tackles (66 solo), nine pass deflections, and a sack. Witherspoon earned Pro Bowl honors for a second consecutive season.

=== 2025: All-Pro and Super Bowl champion ===
Witherspoon suffered a knee injury in Seattle's week 1 game, resulting in him missing five games. On December 7, 2025, Witherspoon made his first career fumble recovery during a 37–9 road win at the Atlanta Falcons. On December 14th, 2025, Witherspoon deflected a pass from Philip Rivers in the closing seconds of Seattle's game against the Indianapolis Colts, which fell into the hands of Coby Bryant for a game-sealing interception. In 12 games played (all starts) during the 2025 NFL season, Witherspoon managed a total of 72 combined tackles (48 solo), seven pass deflections, one interception, and one fumble recovery. Witherspoon finished the 2025 regular season by earning Second-Team All-Pro honors, the first such recognition in his career. Additionally, Witherspoon earned Pro Bowl honors for a third consecutive season since his rookie year, making him the fourth player in Seahawks history to do so.

Seattle finished the regular season atop the NFC West with a 14–3 record and clinched a playoff berth and a first round bye. During the Divisional Round against the 49ers, Witherspoon recorded seven combined tackles (three solo) and one pass deflection in the 41-6 victory. In the NFC Championship Game against the Rams, Witherspoon recorded six solo tackles and two pass deflections in the 31-27 victory. Late in the fourth quarter, Witherspoon recorded back-to-back pass deflections during a goal-line stand and made the final tackle to seal victory for Seattle. In Super Bowl LX against the New England Patriots, Witherspoon recorded four solo tackles, one sack, and one pass deflection; notably, Witherspoon generated immense pressure in the backfield as a pass rusher, leading the team with three quarterback hits. One hit forced an errant throw by Drake Maye, which was intercepted by Uchenna Nwosu and returned 45 yards for a game-sealing touchdown. Assisted by Witherspoon's dominant performance, the Seahawks defeated the Patriots 29-13 in Super Bowl LX.

=== 2026 ===
On March 20, 2026, the Seahawks exercised the fifth-year option on Witherspoon's contract. On August 17, Witherspoon signed a four-year, $132 million contract extension with the Seahawks, making him the highest paid cornerback ever at the time of signing.

== NFL career statistics ==
Legend
	Won the Super Bowl
**Bold**	Career high

=== Regular season ===
Year	Team	Games		Tackles					Interceptions						Fumbles	
Year	Team	GP	GS	Cmb	Solo	Ast	Sck	TFL	PD	Int	Yds	Avg	Lng	TD	FF	FR
2023	SEA	14	13	79	56	23	**3.0**	**8**	**16**	**1**	**97**	**97.0**	**97T**	**1**	**1**	0
2024	SEA	17	17	**98**	**66**	**32**	1.0	6	9	0	0	0.0	0	0	**1**	0
2025	SEA	12	12	72	48	24	0.5	2	7	**1**	3	3.0	3	0	0	**1**
2026	SEA	10	10	60	38	22	2.0	7	3	0	0	0.0	0	0	0	0
Career		53	52	309	208	101	6.5	23	35	2	100	50.0	97T	1	2	1

=== Postseason ===
Year	Team	Games		Tackles					Interceptions						Fumbles	
Year	Team	GP	GS	Cmb	Solo	Ast	Sck	TFL	PD	Int	Yds	Avg	Lng	TD	FF	FR
2025	SEA	3	3	17	13	4	1.0	1	4	–	–	–	–	–	–	–
Career		3	3	17	13	4	1.0	1	4	–	–	–	–	–	–	–
