= Nick Bellore =

American football player (born 1989)

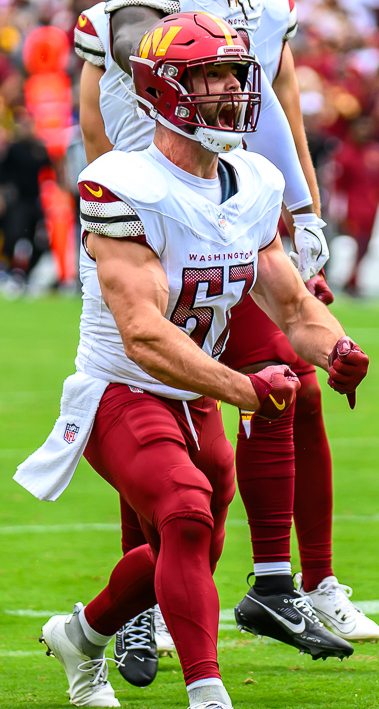
- Bellore with the Washington Commanders in 2025

No. 54, 50, 43, 44, 57
- Positions: Linebacker, Fullback, Special teamer

Personal information
- Born: May 12, 1989 (age 37); Saint Paul, Minnesota, U.S.
- Listed height: 6 ft 1 in (1.85 m)
- Listed weight: 250 lb (113 kg)

Career information
- High school: Whitefish Bay (Whitefish Bay, Wisconsin)
- College: Central Michigan (2007–2010)
- NFL draft: 2011: undrafted

Career history
- New York Jets (2011–2014); San Francisco 49ers (2015–2016); Detroit Lions (2017–2018); Seattle Seahawks (2019–2023); Washington Commanders (2024–2025)

Awards and highlights
- 2× Pro Bowl (2020, 2023); 2× first-team All-MAC (2009, 2010)

Career NFL statistics
- Tackles: 280
- Sacks: 1
- Forced fumbles: 3
- Fumble recoveries: 6
- Interceptions: 1
- Pass deflections: 5
- Receptions: 10
- Receiving yards: 75
- Receiving touchdowns: 2
- Stats at Pro Football Reference

Nicholas Lalonde Bellore (born May 12, 1989) is an American former professional football player who was a linebacker and special teamer in the National Football League (NFL). Bellore played college football for the Central Michigan Chippewas and signed with the New York Jets as an undrafted free agent in 2011. He also played for the San Francisco 49ers, Detroit Lions, Seattle Seahawks, and Washington Commanders, making two Pro Bowls for his special teams play. He retired in 2026 after 15 years of play.

== Early life ==
Bellore was born on May 12, 1989, in St. Paul, Minnesota, and attended Whitefish Bay High School, graduating in 2007. He chose to attend Central Michigan University.

== College career ==
Bellore started at linebacker for the Central Michigan Chippewas his freshman year and through his senior season. Bellore holds the second highest consecutive start streak at CMU with 51 games. He was an All-Mid American Conference First-team selection on defense in 2008, 2009 and 2010. The Chippewas appeared in three bowl games during Bellore's career, winning one (the 2010 GMAC Bowl), only the second bowl win in CMU history. He was also selected as CMU's Defensive Player of the Year in 2008 and 2009.

== Professional career ==
Pre-draft measurables
Height	Weight	Arm length	Hand span	Wingspan	40-yard dash	10-yard split	20-yard split	20-yard shuttle	Three-cone drill	Vertical jump	Broad jump	Bench press
6 ft 1 in (1.85 m)	245 lb (111 kg)	30 3/4 in (0.78 m)	9 7/8 in (0.25 m)	6 ft 2 in (1.88 m)	4.91 s	1.73 s	2.85 s	4.00 s	6.98 s	32.5 in (0.83 m)	9 ft 1 in (2.77 m)	23 reps
All values from NFL Combine

=== New York Jets ===
After going undrafted in the 2011 NFL Draft, Bellore drew interest as an undrafted free agent from over half of the teams in the NFL. He signed with the New York Jets on July 26, 2011, and was kept on the roster to start the 2011 NFL season. He recorded 19 tackles in the 2011 season mainly on special teams. On October 14, 2012, Bellore caught his first career pass on a fake punt by Tim Tebow. He gained 23 yards on the play. Jets coaches looked into converting him to play fullback in training camp of 2012, but the experiment was short lived and he returned to linebacker. On January 6, 2015, Bellore was named to the 2014 Pro Football Focus All-Pro Special Teams.

=== San Francisco 49ers ===
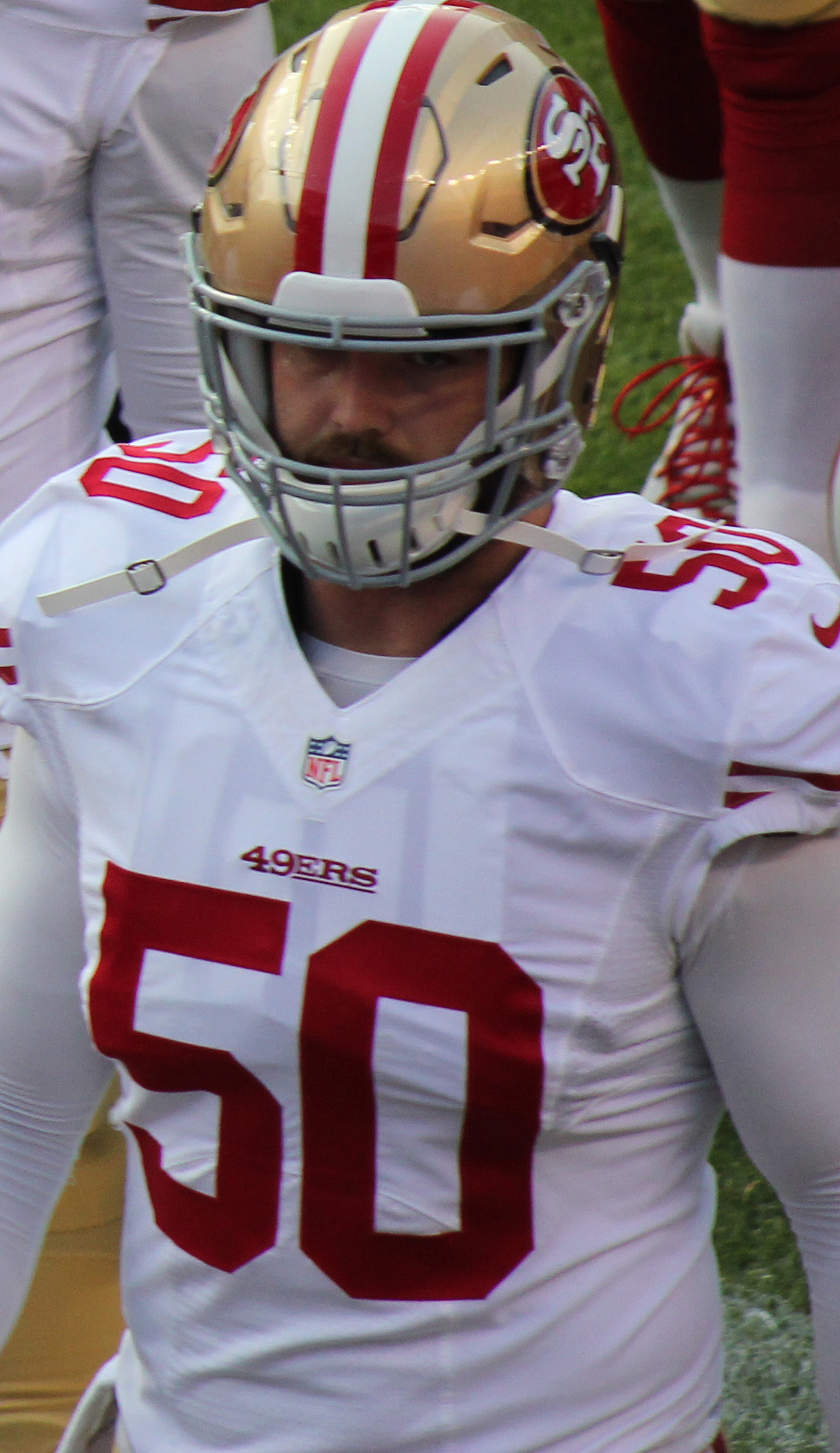
Bellore with the San Francisco 49ers in 2015

Bellore signed a two-year contract with the San Francisco 49ers on April 3, 2015.

In 2016, Bellore appeared in 14 games where he started a career-high 10 games and registered 82 tackles, four passes defensed and the first sack, interception and fumble recovery of his career. He was placed on injured reserve on December 19, 2016, with an elbow injury.

=== Detroit Lions ===
On April 3, 2017, Bellore signed with the Detroit Lions. He was released on September 9, 2017, but was re-signed two days later. Bellore would also start to play on offense as a fullback. He scored his first career touchdown on a one-yard reception against the Baltimore Ravens on December 3, 2017.

On March 14, 2018, Bellore re-signed with the Lions. Bellore exclusively played on offense and special teams and did not log any snaps on defense. He had one rushing attempt, the first of his career, for zero yards and four receptions for 15 yards. Bellore also recorded 9 special teams tackles.

=== Seattle Seahawks ===
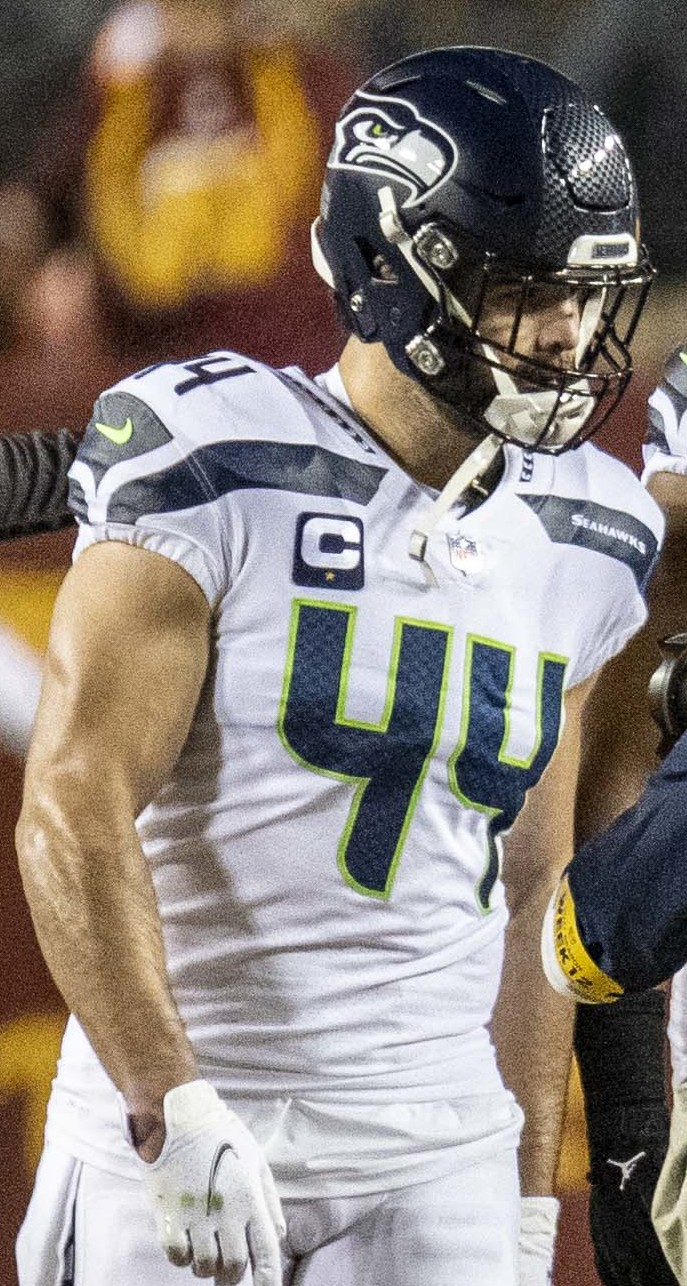
Bellore with the Seattle Seahawks in 2021

On May 9, 2019, Bellore signed with the Seattle Seahawks. He finished the 2019 season with two receptions for 23 yards, including a three-yard touchdown reception in a Week 16 loss against the Arizona Cardinals.

Bellore was released during final roster cuts on September 5, 2020, but re-signed with the team two days later.

During the 2020 NFL season, Bellore recorded 15 tackles and a fumble recovery along with one rushing attempt for five yards and one reception for nine yards. Bellore earned his first career Pro Bowl selection and was selected to the Pro Bowl as a special teamer.

On March 18, 2021, Bellore signed a two-year deal worth $4.4 million, including $1.2 million guaranteed, to remain in Seattle. Bellore finished the season with 14 tackles and a fumble recovery on special teams and one reception for nine yards and one rushing attempt for five yards on offense.

During the 2022 season, Bellore played snaps on defense for the first time since the 2017 season. Bellore played fullback on offense, linebacker on defense, and was a key part of the Seahawks' special teams units. He recorded 15 tackles and one rushing attempt for three yards.

On February 22, 2023, Bellore signed a two-year contract extension with the Seahawks. He recorded 14 tackles during the 2023 season. Bellore was selected to the second Pro Bowl of his career as an alternate for the 2024 Pro Bowl as a special teamer. He replaced Detroit Lions player Jalen Reeves-Maybin, who opted out.

Bellore was released by the Seahawks on March 11, 2024.

=== Washington Commanders ===
Bellore signed with the practice squad of the Washington Commanders on September 2, 2024. He was signed to the active roster on September 14. In 16 appearances for Washington, almost exclusively on special teams, Bellore logged 21 total tackles. On March 18, 2025, Bellore re-signed with the Commanders on a two-year contract.

On July 27, 2026, Bellore announced his retirement from professional football.
