= Jerrick Reed II =

American football player (born 2000)

No. 33 – Arizona Cardinals
- Position: Safety
- Roster status: Practice squad

Personal information
- Born: August 7, 2000 (age 26); Olive Branch, Mississippi, U.S.
- Listed height: 5 ft 9 in (1.75 m)
- Listed weight: 196 lb (89 kg)

Career information
- High school: Olive Branch (MS)
- College: Northwest Mississippi CC (2018); New Mexico (2019–2022)
- NFL draft: 2023: 6th round, 198th overall pick

Career history
- Seattle Seahawks (2023–2025); Tennessee Titans (2025–2026); Arizona Cardinals (2026–present)*
- * Offseason or practice squad member only

Awards and highlights
- PFWA All-Rookie Team (2023)

Career NFL statistics as of 2025
- Total tackles: 24
- Stats at Pro Football Reference

Jerrick Jamal Reed II (born August 7, 2000) is an American professional football safety for the Arizona Cardinals of the National Football League (NFL). He played college football for the Northwest Mississippi Rangers and New Mexico Lobos. Reed was selected by the Seattle Seahawks in the sixth round of the 2023 NFL draft.

== Early life ==
Reed was born on August 7, 2000 in Olive Branch, Mississippi. He grew up in Olive Branch, and attended Olive Branch High School. As a senior, he totaled 99 tackles with seven interceptions, being named first-team all-state by the Clarion-Ledger. Reed was not highly recruited due to his height and received no Division I college football offers, eventually choosing to play at Northwest Mississippi Community College.

== College career ==
Reed played only one season for Northwest Mississippi, posting 71 tackles, three pass breakups, two interceptions and a sack. Afterwards, he transferred to New Mexico. In his first season there, he started 10 games and tallied 51 tackles, fifth-best on the team, and one interception, as well as 3.0 tackles-for-loss and a pass breakup. The following year, Reed made a career-high four interceptions in just seven games, only five of which he started. He additionally made seven pass breakups, being named first-team all-conference at the end of the season.

Reed led the team with 89 tackles while starting all 12 games in 2021, additionally tying for the lead in pass breakups with seven. He was an honorable mention all-conference choice. In 2022, he made a 94 tackles in 12 games and was named New Mexico's team MVP.

== Professional career ==
Pre-draft measurables
Height	Weight	Arm length	Hand span	Wingspan	40-yard dash	10-yard split	20-yard split	20-yard shuttle	Three-cone drill	Vertical jump	Broad jump	Bench press
5 ft 9 3/4 in (1.77 m)	196 lb (89 kg)	31 in (0.79 m)	9 3/8 in (0.24 m)	6 ft 0 5/8 in (1.84 m)	4.46 s	1.54 s	2.59 s	4.31 s	7.16 s	38.0 in (0.97 m)	10 ft 2 in (3.10 m)	18 reps
All values from New Mexico's Pro Day

=== Seattle Seahawks ===
Reed was selected by the Seattle Seahawks in the sixth round (198th overall) of the 2023 NFL draft. He was the first New Mexico player to be selected in the draft since 2018.

Reed entered his rookie season as a backup safety and special teamer. He suffered a torn ACL in Week 11 and was placed on injured reserve on November 23, 2023. He was named to the PFWA NFL All-Rookie Team.

On July 18, 2024, Reed was placed on the active/physically unable to perform (PUP) list, and was placed on reserves to begin the season. He was activated on October 26.

On August 26, 2025, Reed was waived by the Seahawks as part of final roster cuts and re-signed to the practice squad the next day He was promoted to the active roster on September 20. On September 23, Reed was waived by the Seahawks and re-signed to the practice squad the next day. He was signed to the active roster on November 1. Reed was waived on November 4.

=== Tennessee Titans ===
On November 5, 2025, the Tennessee Titans claimed Reed off waivers.

On March 13, 2026, Reed re-signed with the Titans on a one-year contract. Reed was waived by Tennessee on August 31; he was re–signed to the team's practice squad two days later. On September 7, he was released by Tennessee.

=== Arizona Cardinals ===
On September 16, 2026, Reed signed with the Arizona Cardinals' practice squad. On October 27, he was released. On November 17, Reed was re-signed to the practice squad.
