= Smith-Njigba =

Smith-Njigba is a surname. Notable people with the name include:

- Canaan Smith-Njigba (born 1999), American baseball outfielder
- Jaxon Smith-Njigba (born 2002), American football wide receiver

== See also ==
- Smith (surname)
