= Jameson Taillon =

American baseball player (born 1991)

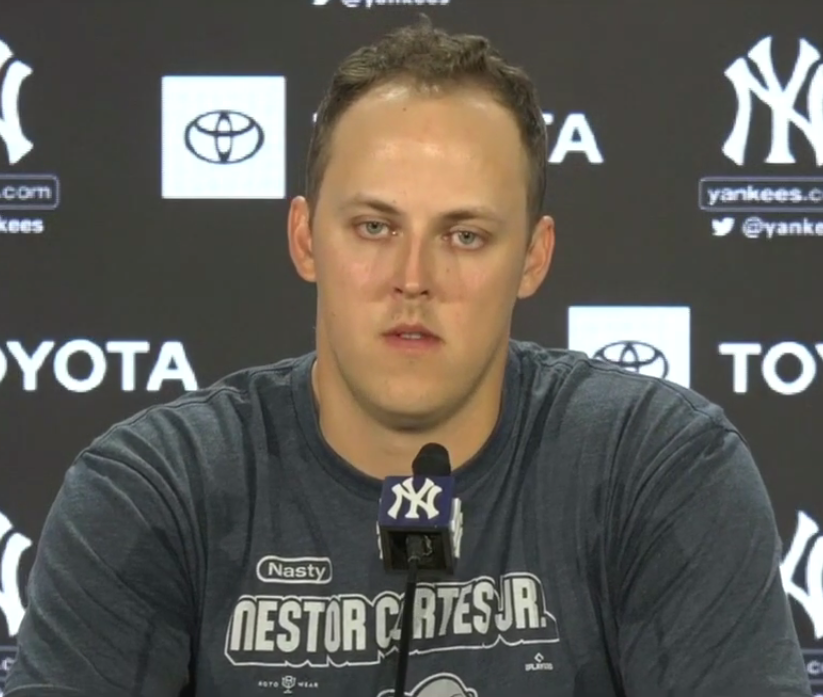
- Taillon with the New York Yankees in 2021

Free agent
- Pitcher
- Born: November 18, 1991 (age 34); Lakeland, Florida, U.S.
- Bats: Right Throws: Right

MLB debut
- June 8, 2016, for the Pittsburgh Pirates

MLB statistics (through 2026 season)
- Win–loss record: 84–66
- Earned run average: 3.99
- Strikeouts: 1,149
- Stats at Baseball Reference

Teams
- Pittsburgh Pirates (2016–2019); New York Yankees (2021–2022); Chicago Cubs (2023–2026); Toronto Blue Jays (2026)

Jameson Lee Taillon (/ˈtaɪoʊn/ TY-ohn; born November 18, 1991) is a Canadian-American professional baseball pitcher who is a free agent. He has played in Major League Baseball (MLB) for the Pittsburgh Pirates, New York Yankees, Chicago Cubs, and Toronto Blue Jays.

The Pirates chose Taillon as the second overall pick in the 2010 MLB draft. He made his MLB debut in 2016. The Pirates traded Taillon to the Yankees before the 2021 season and he signed with the Cubs after the 2022 season.

== Early life ==
Jameson Taillon was born in Lakeland, Florida to Christie and Michael Taillon on November 18, 1991. Taillon attended The Woodlands High School in Texas. He caught the attention of scouts with a 22–6 win–loss record in his high school career. He was 8–1 during his senior year and threw a 19-strikeout no-hitter against rival Conroe High School on March 23, 2010.

== Professional career ==
=== Minor league career ===
Prior to the 2010 MLB draft, Fangraphs called Taillon the best high school pitching prospect since Josh Beckett (1999). Baseball America compared him to pitchers like Stephen Strasburg. The Pittsburgh Pirates selected Taillon with the second overall selection of the draft. He had signed a National Letter of Intent with Rice University in November 2009 posing a challenge to the Pirates in their effort to sign him. However, hours before the signing deadline, the Pittsburgh Post-Gazette reported that Taillon had indeed signed with the Pirates. Baseball America's Jim Callis reported that Taillon's deal included a $6.5 million signing bonus, the second-highest in draft history.

Taillon made his professional debut with the West Virginia Power against the Hagerstown Suns on April 27, 2011. He joined the team on April 24 after staying in Florida for an extended spring training assignment. He spent the whole season with the Power, going 2–3 with a 3.98 earned run average (ERA) in 23 starts.

Taillon was named to appear in the 2012 All-Star Futures Game. He began the season with the Bradenton Marauders and he was promoted to the Altoona Curve in August 2012. In his first week with the Curve, August 20–26, 2012, Taillon was named the Eastern League pitcher of the week. In 26 starts between the two teams, he was 9–8 with a 3.55 ERA.

Prior to the 2013 season, Taillon was ranked as the 15th best prospect in baseball by MLB.com. Taillon participated in the 2013 World Baseball Classic for Team Canada, being the youngest member of the team at age 21. He began the season with Altoona and was promoted to the Indianapolis Indians in August. In 26 games (25 starts) between both clubs, Taillon compiled a 5–10 record and 3.73 ERA.

Taillon underwent Tommy John surgery in April 2014 to repair damage to the ulnar collateral ligament of the elbow in his throwing arm, costing him the 2014 season. A hernia surgery caused him to miss the 2015 season.

=== Pittsburgh Pirates (2016–2020) ===
Taillon returned in 2016 with the Pirates, where he made 10 starts before earning his first major league call-up. Taillon went 4–2 with a 2.04 ERA, striking out 61 in 61.2 innings and walking only 6. On June 8, Taillon was recalled to make a spot start with the Pirates, who decided to push back Francisco Liriano's start one day after they played a doubleheader the day before. Facing off against fellow 2010 first rounder Noah Syndergaard in his debut, Taillon threw 6 innings, giving up 3 runs on 6 hits, 2 walks, and 3 strikeouts, not receiving a decision in the eventual 6–5 loss. After the game, Taillon was optioned back to Triple-A, but not without receiving compliments from his manager, Clint Hurdle, on his effort, saying, "This kid's poured into everything he's done. It's been a great fight back." However, his stay in Indianapolis was very brief, as an injury to Gerrit Cole necessitated a move to bring Taillon back into the rotation. On June 14, Taillon made his second start, also against the Mets, throwing 8 scoreless innings, carrying a no-hitter into the seventh before it was broken up by Curtis Granderson, and recording his first win in the 4–0 victory. In July, he was hit in the head by a batted ball. Taillon spent the remainder of 2016 with Pittsburgh. In 18 starts, he compiled a 5–4 record and a 3.38 ERA.

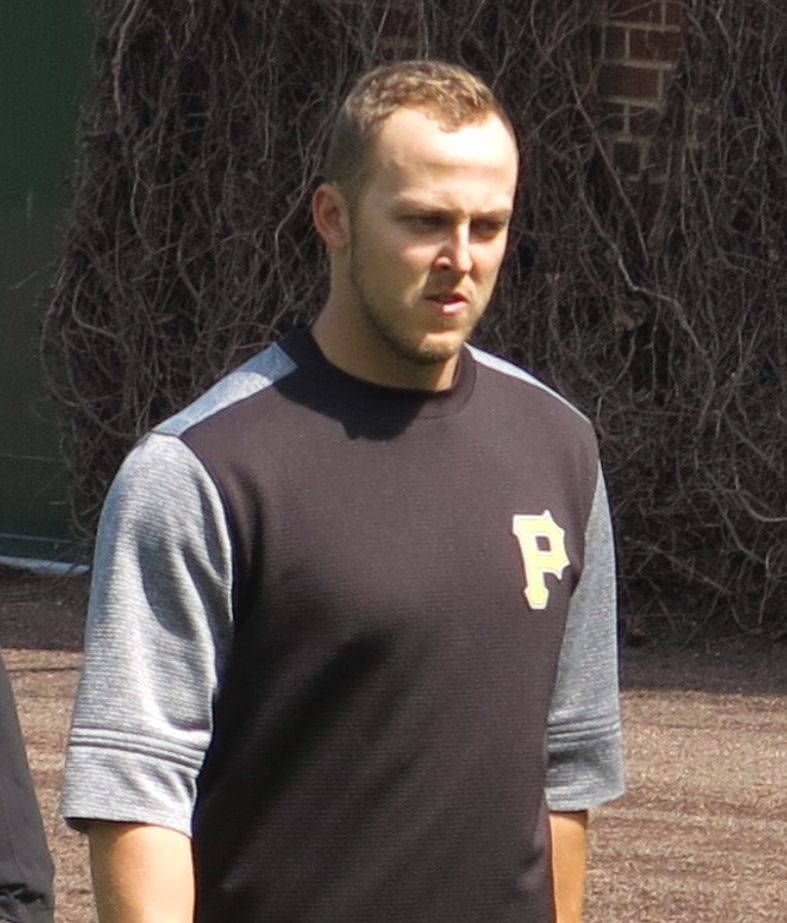
Taillon with the Pirates in 2017

Taillon was in the Pirates' starting rotation in 2017. He was placed on the disabled list in May as he underwent surgery for testicular cancer. Taillon made his first rehabilitation start three weeks later, giving up one run in three innings. He returned to the mound for the Pirates on June 12. In 25 starts during the 2017 season, he pitched to an 8–7 record and 4.44 ERA.

In the 2018 season, Taillon pitched to a 3.20 ERA in 32 starts. He was 14–10 in 191 innings. He tied for the major league lead in complete games with two.

In 2019, Taillon's season was cut short due to a forearm injury. He was shut down for the remainder of the season on August 2, 2019; he was 2–3 with a 4.10 ERA in 7 starts. On August 14, he underwent surgery to repair a flexor tendon as well as UCL revision. Taillon did not make an appearance in the 2020 season.

=== New York Yankees (2021–2022) ===
On January 24, 2021, the Pirates traded Taillon to the New York Yankees for prospects Miguel Yajure, Roansy Contreras, Maikol Escotto, and Canaan Smith-Njigba. He was named the American League Pitcher of the Month in July, posting a 1.16 ERA. He finished the 2021 season with an 8–6 record in 29 starts with a 4.30 ERA and 140 strikeouts in 144 1/3 innings. On June 2, 2022, Taillon pitched seven perfect innings against the Los Angeles Angels. This bid was broken up by a Jared Walsh double in the eighth inning.

=== Chicago Cubs (2023–2026) ===
On December 19, 2022, Taillon signed a four-year contract worth $68 million with the Chicago Cubs. Taillon appeared in 30 games for Chicago in 2023, with 29 of them being starts. He went 8-10 with a 4.84 ERA and 140 strikeouts across 154 1/3 innings pitched.

On March 12, 2024, Cubs manager Craig Counsell informed reporters that Taillon would likely be starting the regular season on the injured list with lower back tightness. Taillon appeared in 28 games in 2024, went 12-8 with a 3.27 ERA and 125 strikeouts across 165 1/3 innings.

On April 27, 2025, Taillon recorded his 1,000th career strikeout against the Philadelphia Phillies when he struck out Bryson Stott in the top of the first inning.

Taillon made 15 starts for Chicago in 2026, posting a 2–6 record and 5.92 ERA with 68 strikeouts over 76 innings of work. On July 27, 2026, Taillon was designated for assignment by the Cubs.

=== Toronto Blue Jays (2026–present) ===
On August 2, 2026, the Cubs traded Taillon to the Toronto Blue Jays in exchange for a player to be named later. He made three starts for the Blue Jays, recording a 3.60 ERA with eight strikeouts over ten innings of work. Taillon's season ended prematurely on September 4 when he was forced to leave his start against the Kansas City Royals due to right elbow discomfort.

== International career ==
Taillon twice played for Team Canada at the World Baseball Classic, in 2013 when he had played for the Double-A Altoona Curve the previous season, and in 2026, when he was with the Cubs. Taillon said that he declined playing for Canada in 2017 due to it being his first full season in the major leagues, and in 2023 due to it being his first season with the Cubs.

== Personal life ==
Taillon underwent surgery for testicular cancer on May 8, 2017. He had one testicle removed. As of 2019, he was cancer-free.

Taillon's parents are Canadian, and he holds citizenship in both Canada and the United States.

Awards and achievements
Preceded by Sean Manaea	American League Pitcher of the Month; July 2021	Succeeded by Robbie Ray
