= Roansy Contreras =

Dominican baseball player (born 1999)

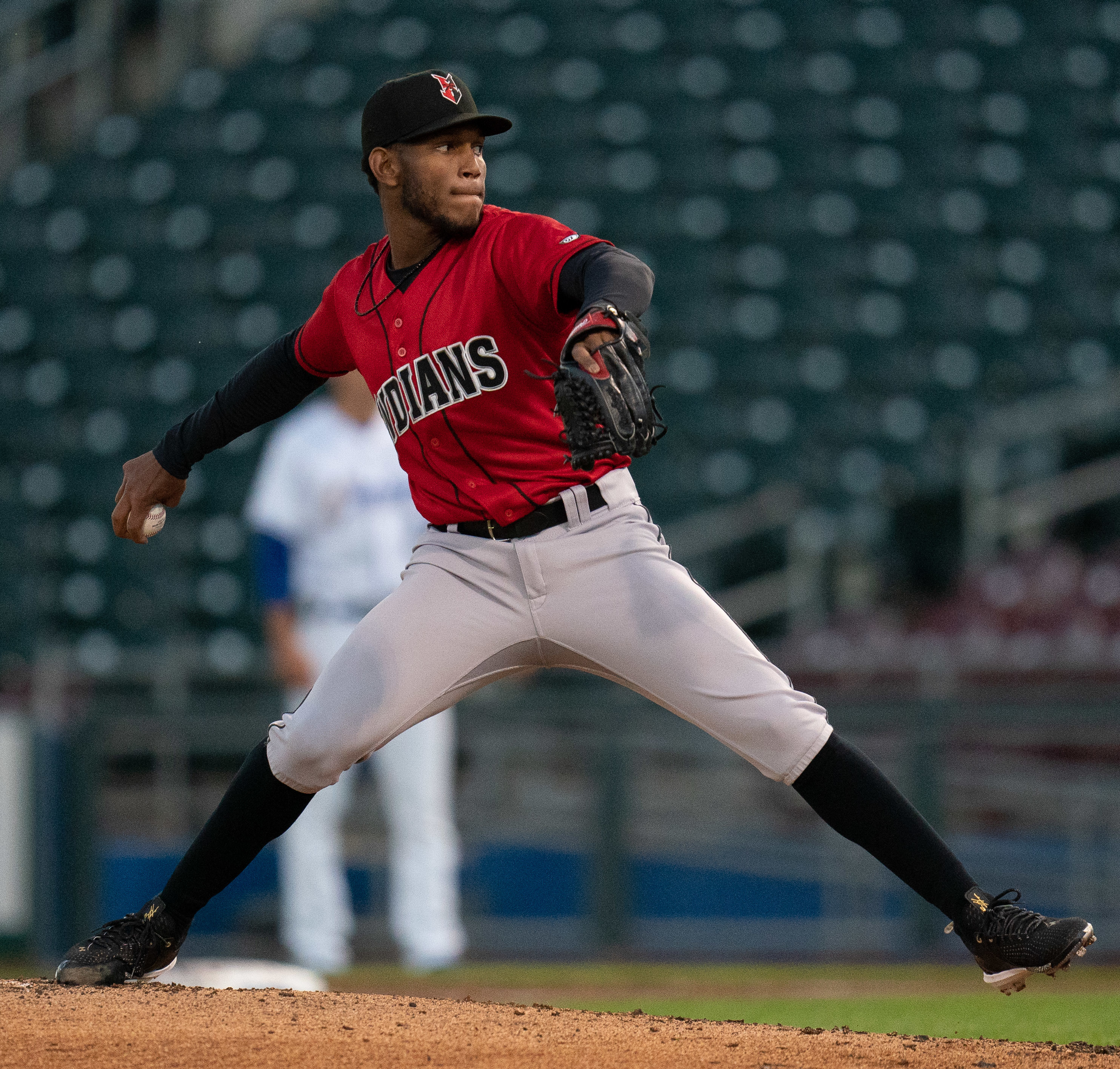
- Contreras with the Indianapolis Indians in 2021

Free agent
- Pitcher
- Born: November 7, 1999 (age 26); Peralvillo, Dominican Republic
- Bats: Right Throws: Right

Professional debut
- MLB: September 29, 2021, for the Pittsburgh Pirates
- NPB: July 5, 2026, for the Tohoku Rakuten Golden Eagles

MLB statistics (through 2025 season)
- Win–loss record: 10–16
- Earned run average: 4.77
- Strikeouts: 207

NPB statistics (through 2026 season)
- Win–loss record: 0–1
- Earned run average: 6.92
- Strikeouts: 5
- Stats at Baseball Reference

Teams
- Pittsburgh Pirates (2021–2024); Los Angeles Angels (2024); Baltimore Orioles (2025); Colorado Rockies (2025); Tohoku Rakuten Golden Eagles (2026)

Roansy Contreras (born November 7, 1999) is a Dominican professional baseball pitcher who is a free agent. He has previously played in Major League Baseball (MLB) for the Pittsburgh Pirates, Los Angeles Angels, Baltimore Orioles, and Colorado Rockies and in Nippon Professional Baseball (NPB) for the Tohoku Rakuten Golden Eagles.

== Career ==
=== New York Yankees ===
Contreras signed with the New York Yankees as an international free agent on July 2, 2016. He split his professional debut season of 2017 between the Dominican Summer League Yankees and the rookie–level Gulf Coast League Yankees, going a combined 4–4 with a 4.02 ERA and 34 strikeouts over 53 2/3 innings. Contreras split the 2018 season between the Low–A Staten Island Yankees and the Single–A Charleston RiverDogs, going a combined 0–2 with a 2.42 ERA and 60 strikeouts over 63 1/3 innings. He returned to Charleston for the 2019 campaign, going 12–5 with a 3.33 ERA and 113 strikeouts over 132 1/3 innings. He did not play in a game in 2020 due to the cancellation of the minor league season because of the COVID-19 pandemic. On November 20, 2020, the Yankees added Contreras to their 40-man roster to protect him from the Rule 5 draft.

=== Pittsburgh Pirates ===
On January 24, 2021, New York traded Contreras, Miguel Yajure, Maikol Escotto, and Canaan Smith-Njigba to the Pittsburgh Pirates in exchange for Jameson Taillon. In June 2021, Contreras was selected to play in the All-Star Futures Game. He missed over two months from June 30 to September 1 with a right forearm strain. He split the 2021 minor league season between the Double–A Altoona Curve and the Triple–A Indianapolis Indians, going a combined 3–2 with a 2.64 ERA and 82 strikeouts over 58 innings.

On September 29, 2021, Contreras had his contract selected to the active roster, to make his MLB debut that night versus the Chicago Cubs. Contreras started the 2022 season in Triple-A Indianapolis, but on April 8, 2022, the Pirates recalled him from the minor leagues. On April 14, Contreras earned his first major league win in a 9–4 victory over the Washington Nationals. In 21 games for the club, he registered a 5–5 record and 3.79 ERA with 86 strikeouts across 95 innings of work.

In 2023, Contreras made 19 appearances (11 starts) for Pittsburgh, but struggled to a 3–7 record and 6.59 ERA with 55 strikeouts across 68 1/3 innings pitched. Out of options entering the 2024 season, Contreras became a relief pitcher. In 12 outings, he registered a 4.41 ERA with 16 strikeouts across 16 1/3 innings pitched. On May 11, 2024, Contreras was designated for assignment following the promotion of Paul Skenes.

=== Los Angeles Angels ===
On May 16, 2024, Contreras was traded to the Los Angeles Angels in exchange for cash considerations. In 37 appearances for the Angels, Contreras compiled a 1–4 record and 4.33 ERA with 40 strikeouts and 2 saves across 52 innings of work.

=== Baltimore Orioles ===
On October 31, 2024, Contreras was claimed off waivers by the Texas Rangers. He was designated for assignment following the signing of Nathan Eovaldi on December 12. Contreras was claimed off waivers by the Cincinnati Reds on December 19 and then designated for assignment again on January 6, 2025. Contreras was claimed off waivers once again on January 10, this time by the Baltimore Orioles. He was designated for assignment by the Orioles on January 16. On January 23, Contreras was claimed off waivers by the New York Yankees. On February 7, Contreras was claimed back off waivers by the Orioles. He was designated for assignment once more on March 27. Contreras cleared waivers and was sent outright to the Triple-A Norfolk Tides the same day. In 28 appearances (14 starts) for Norfolk, he logged a 7-3 record and 3.73 ERA with 70 strikeouts and one save across 91 2/3 innings pitched. On August 27, the Orioles selected Contreras' contract, adding him to their active roster. That night, he tossed 4 1/3 scoreless innings against the Boston Red Sox, recording two strikeouts and one walk. Contreras was designated for assignment by Baltimore the following day.

=== Colorado Rockies ===
On September 2, 2025, Contreras was claimed off waivers by the Colorado Rockies. He made four appearances for Colorado, but struggled to an 8.64 ERA with four strikeouts across 8 1/3 innings pitched. On November 12, Contreras was released by the Rockies.

=== Tohoku Rakuten Golden Eagles ===
On November 13, 2025, Contreras signed with the Tohoku Rakuten Golden Eagles of Nippon Professional Baseball. On October 5, 2026, the Golden Eagles announced they would not be re-signing Contreras for the 2027 season.
