= Miguel Yajure =

Venezuelan baseball player (born 1998)

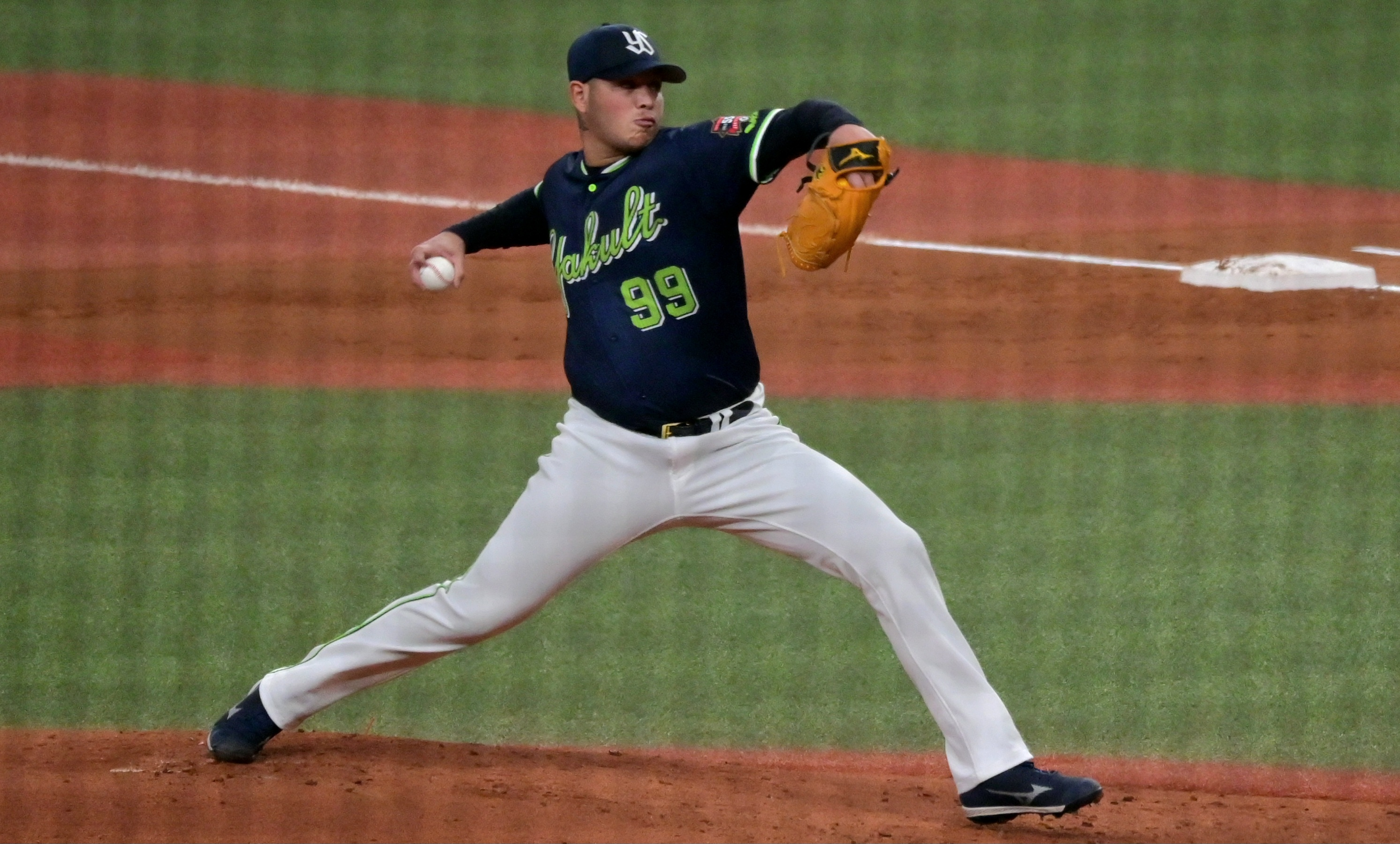
- Yajure with the Tokyo Yakult Swallows

Free agent
- Pitcher
- Born: May 1, 1998 (age 28); Cabimas, Venezuela
- Bats: Switch Throws: Right

Professional debut
- MLB: August 31, 2020, for the New York Yankees
- NPB: March 30, 2024, for the Tokyo Yakult Swallows

MLB statistics (through 2022 season)
- Win–loss record: 1–3
- Earned run average: 7.58
- Strikeouts: 35

NPB statistics (through 2025 season)
- Win–loss record: 7-16
- Earned run average: 3.72
- Strikeouts: 114
- Stats at Baseball Reference

Teams
- New York Yankees (2020); Pittsburgh Pirates (2021–2022); Tokyo Yakult Swallows (2024); Tohoku Rakuten Golden Eagles (2025)

Miguel Angel Yajure (born May 1, 1998) is a Venezuelan professional baseball pitcher who is a free agent. He has previously played in Major League Baseball (MLB) for the New York Yankees and Pittsburgh Pirates, and in Nippon Professional Baseball (NPB) for the Tokyo Yakult Swallows and Tohoku Rakuten Golden Eagles. Yajure signed with the Yankees as an international free agent in 2015, and made his MLB debut with them in 2020, becoming the first major-league player to wear number 89, MLB's last unused uniform number.

== Career ==
=== New York Yankees ===
Yajure signed with the New York Yankees as an international free agent in March 2015, receiving $30,000. He made his professional debut that season at 17 years of age with the Dominican Summer League Yankees, and was 0–2 with a 1.42 ERA with an 0.926 WHIP in 57 innings in 14 starts. He played in 2016 with the Gulf Coast Yankees, and was 1–2 with a 2.87 earned run average (ERA) in 31 1/3 innings over nine games (six starts).

Yajure missed 2017 after undergoing Tommy John surgery. Yajure returned in 2018 and pitched with the Single–A Charleston RiverDogs, for whom he was 4–3 with a 3.90 ERA in 64 2/3 innings over 14 starts.

Yajure started 2019 with the Single–A Tampa Tarpons before being promoted for two starts to the Double–A Trenton Thunder. Between the two teams, he was 9–6 with a 2.14 ERA (leading all of minor league baseball, minimum 125 innings) in 138 2/3 innings covering 24 games (20 starts), in which he had 133 strikeouts (2nd among Yankee minor league pitchers). He was 2nd in the Florida State League with 122 strikeouts, 8th in wins, and walked 2.0 batters per 9 innings. After the 2019 season, he was named a 2019 Florida State League Postseason All-Star. After the season, Baseball America ranked him 11th among Yankees minor leaguers, and as having the best control among all Yankee minor league pitchers. On November 20, 2019, the Yankees added Yajure to their 40-man roster to protect him from the Rule 5 draft.

Yajure made his major league debut in relief on August 31, 2020, against the Tampa Bay Rays. He pitched three shutout innings, with two strikeouts and three walks. He wore number 89, MLB's last unused uniform number. In three relief appearances with New York in 2020, Yajure compiled a 1.29 ERA while striking out eight batters in seven innings, limited Major League batters to a .130 average.

=== Pittsburgh Pirates ===
On January 24, 2021, the Yankees traded Yajure, Roansy Contreras, Maikol Escotto, and Canaan Smith-Njigba to the Pittsburgh Pirates for pitcher Jameson Taillon. On June 24, Yajure was placed on the 60-day injured list with right forearm/elbow soreness. He made four appearances (three starts) for the Pirates during 2021, pitching to an 8.40 ERA and striking out 11 batters in 15 innings. He also appeared in nine games for the Triple-A Indianapolis Indians, compiling a 3.09 ERA and 2–3 record in 43 2/3 innings over nine starts.

On September 14, 2022, Yajure recorded his first career save. Pitching in relief against the Cincinnati Reds, he surrendered two earned runs on two hits and a walk with two strikeouts in three innings of work. During the 2022 season, Yajure split time between Indianapolis, pitching primarily as a starter and going 4–4 with a 6.09 ERA in 54 2/3 innings over 16 games (14 starts), and Pittsburgh, pitching primarily as a reliever and going 1–1 with an 8.88 ERA in 24 1/3 innings over 12 games (one start). In the minors leagues through 2022 he averaged 8.2 hits, 0.5 home runs, 2.4 walks, and 7.9 strikeouts per 9 innings.

=== San Francisco Giants ===
On December 2, 2022, Yajure was claimed off waivers by the San Francisco Giants. On December 13, Yajure was removed from the 40-man roster and sent outright to the Triple–A Sacramento River Cats. He spent the 2023 season split between the Single–A San Jose Giants, High–A Eugene Emeralds, and Triple–A Sacramento River Cats. In 22 combined appearances (19 starts), Yajure struggled to a 2–6 record and 6.07 ERA with 80 strikeouts across 75 2/3 innings of work. He elected free agency following the season on November 6, 2023.

=== Tokyo Yakult Swallows ===
On December 6, 2023, Yajure signed with the Tokyo Yakult Swallows of Nippon Professional Baseball. In 23 appearances for the team in 2024, he compiled a 5–10 record and 3.34 ERA with 84 strikeouts across 129 1/3 innings pitched. On November 5, 2024, the Swallows announced that they would not bring Yajure back for the 2025 season, making him a free agent.

=== Tohoku Rakuten Golden Eagles ===
On December 6, 2024, Yajure signed with the Tohoku Rakuten Golden Eagles of Nippon Professional Baseball. He made 14 appearances for Rakuten in 2025, logging a 2-6 record and 4.48 ERA with 30 strikeouts across 64 1/3 innings pitched. On December 3, 2025, Yajure and the Eagles parted ways.

=== Houston Astros ===
In March 2026, Yajure temporarily joined the Diablos Rojos del México during the 2026 Baseball Champions League Americas. On April 14, 2026, he officially signed with the club. However, on April 17, Yajure signed a minor league contract with the Houston Astros organization. He made one appearance for the Triple-A Sugar Land Space Cowboys before suffering an injury, causing him to be placed on the injured list on April 25. Yajure was released by the Astros organization on June 5.

== Pitching style ==
He is noted for his control. He has four pitches which include a fastball that occasionally reached 97 mph by 2020, a curveball, a cutter, and a good changeup.
