= Myles Garrett =

American football player (born 1995)

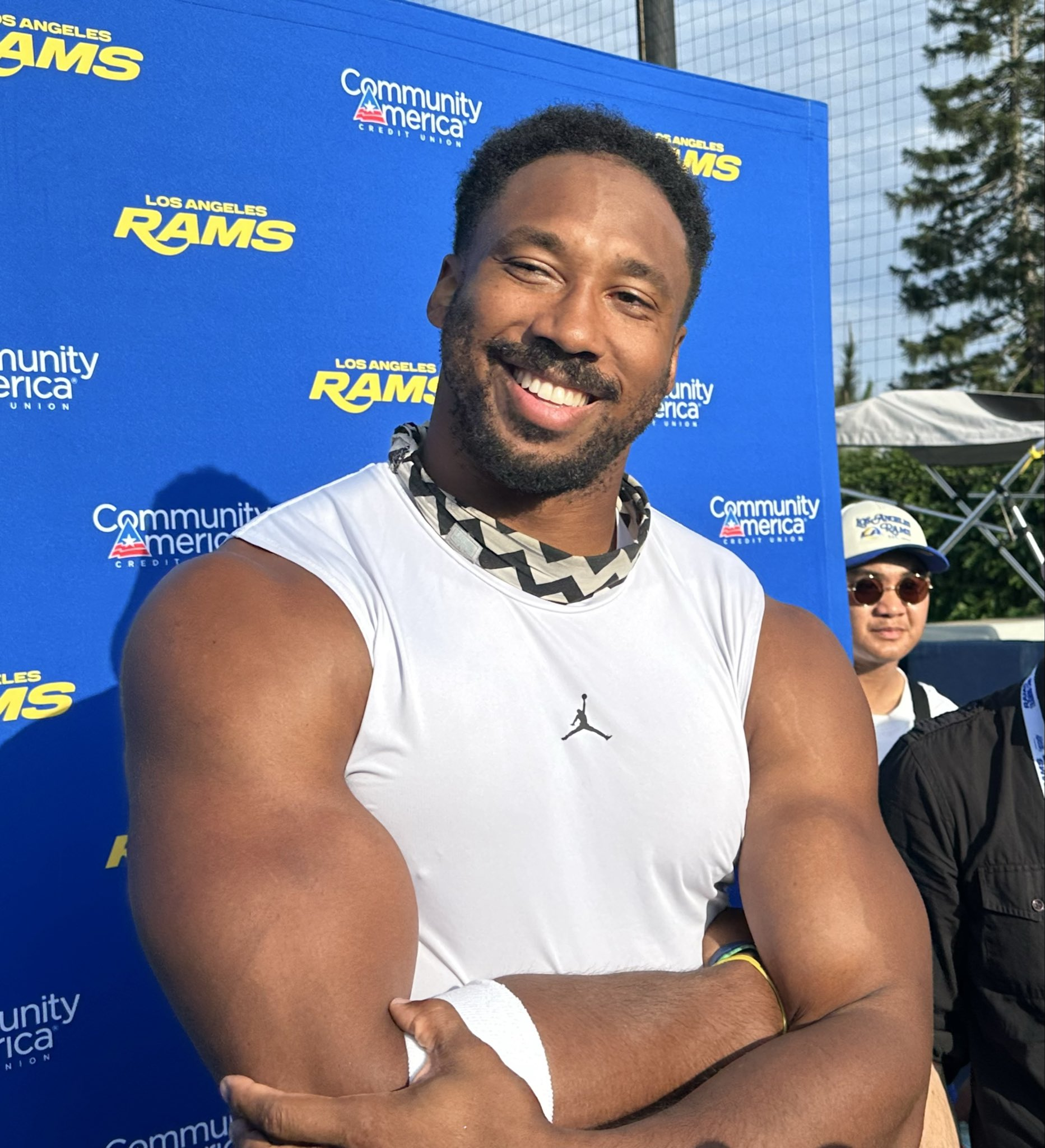
- Garrett with the Los Angeles Rams in 2026

No. 95 – Los Angeles Rams
- Position: Outside linebacker
- Roster status: Active

Personal information
- Born: December 29, 1995 (age 30); Arlington, Texas, U.S.
- Listed height: 6 ft 4 in (1.93 m)
- Listed weight: 272 lb (123 kg)

Career information
- High school: Martin (Arlington)
- College: Texas A&M (2014–2016)
- NFL draft: 2017: 1st round, 1st overall pick

Career history
- Cleveland Browns (2017–2025); Los Angeles Rams (2026–present)

Awards and highlights
- 2× NFL Defensive Player of the Year (2023, 2025); 5× First-team All-Pro (2020, 2021, 2023–2025); 2× Second-team All-Pro (2018, 2022); 7× Pro Bowl (2018, 2020−2025); Deacon Jones Award (2025); PFWA All-Rookie Team (2017); Bill Willis Trophy (2015); Unanimous All-American (2016); First-team All-American (2015); 2× First-team All-SEC (2015, 2016); Second-team All-SEC (2014); NFL records: Sacks in a single season: 23; Most consecutive seasons with 12+ sacks: 6

Career NFL statistics as of Week 11, 2026
- Tackles: 415
- Sacks: 128.5
- Forced fumbles: 24
- Fumble recoveries: 6
- Pass deflections: 18
- Touchdowns: 1
- Stats at Pro Football Reference

Myles Lorenz Garrett (born December 29, 1995) is an American professional football outside linebacker for the Los Angeles Rams of the National Football League (NFL). He played college football for the Texas A&M Aggies, earning the Bill Willis Trophy and first-team All-American honors after leading the Southeastern Conference in sacks in 2015. The following year, he was named a unanimous All-American. Garrett was selected first overall by the Cleveland Browns in the 2017 NFL draft.

With the Browns, Garrett won NFL Defensive Player of the Year in 2023 and 2025, in addition to receiving seven Pro Bowl and five first-team All-Pro selections. Garrett is also the Browns' all-time sacks leader. Following nine seasons in Cleveland, he was traded to the Rams in 2026. He holds the NFL single-season sack record at 23, which he set in 2025.

== Early life ==
Garrett attended Martin High School in Arlington, Texas, where he was a letterman in football, basketball, and track. In football, he had 19.5 sacks as a senior and was the 2013 recipient of the Landry Award, given to the top high school player in the Dallas-Fort Worth metroplex. Garrett was rated as a five-star recruit by the Rivals.com recruiting network and was ranked as the second best overall player in his class. He committed to play college football at Texas A&M University in October 2013. In track and field, he was a state qualifier in the throwing events, with top throws of 16.01 meters in the shot put and 50.84 meters in the discus throw.

College recruiting
| Name | Hometown | School | Height | Weight | 40^{‡} | Commit date |
|---|---|---|---|---|---|---|
| Myles Garrett; DE | Arlington, Texas | James Martin HS | 6 ft 5 in (1.96 m) | 247 lb (112 kg) | 5.08 | Oct 18, 2013 |
| Myles Garrett; DE | Recruit ratings: Scout: Rivals: 247Sports: ESPN: | | | | | |
Overall recruit ranking: Scout: 1 (DE) Rivals: 1 (DE) ESPN: 1 (DE)
Note: In many cases, Scout, Rivals, 247Sports, On3, and ESPN may conflict in their listings of height and weight.; In these cases, the average was taken. ESPN grades are on a 100-point scale.; Sources: "Texas A&M Football Commitments". Rivals.; "2014 Texas A & M College Football Recruiting Commits". Scout.; "ESPN". ESPN.; "Scout.com Team Recruiting Rankings". Scout.; "2014 Team Ranking". Rivals.com.

== College career ==
=== Freshman year ===
Garrett came to Texas A&M as the #2 overall prospect in the nation. As a true freshman in 2014, Garrett broke the Aggies' freshman sack record of 5.5 in only six games. In only nine games, he broke Jadeveon Clowney's Southeastern Conference (SEC) freshman sack record of eight. Garrett finished the season with 11.5 sacks (second in the SEC), 53 total tackles, 14 tackles for loss, 10 quarterback hurries, and a blocked kick (which teammate Deshazor Everett returned for a touchdown against Auburn). He was a consensus Freshman All-American by USA Today and Freshman All-SEC selection. After the conclusion of the season, Garrett announced that he would undergo surgery to repair torn ligaments in his hand, an injury that occurred in the sixth game of the season, against Mississippi State.

=== Sophomore year ===
Garrett led the SEC with 12.5 sacks as a sophomore. He recorded 57 total tackles (36 solo), 19.5 tackles for loss, five forced fumbles, and a blocked punt (which came against Alabama). In addition, Garrett recorded his first interception, off his own-tipped ball, in the game against Ole Miss. The season earned Garrett a first-team All-American selection by the Walter Camp Football Foundation and the Football Writers Association of America. Garrett was the Bill Willis Trophy winner as the top defensive lineman.

=== Junior year ===
Garrett's junior year found him limited by injuries. He suffered a high-ankle sprain to his left leg in the fourth game of the season against Arkansas, and did not appear in the games against South Carolina and New Mexico State. Garrett also found his availability limited to third downs in some other games while he recovered from the injury. For the season, Garrett recorded 8.5 sacks, 32 total tackles (18 of them solo), 15.0 tackles for loss, 10 quarterback hurries, two forced fumbles, and a pass breakup. The season resulted in Garrett earning a Unanimous Consensus All-American designation by being voted to the first-team by the Walter Camp Football Foundation, the Football Writers Association of America, the American Football Coaches Association, The Sporting News, the Associated Press, Pro Football Focus, and SB Nation.

== Professional career ==
=== Pre-draft ===
On December 31, 2016, Garrett announced his decision to forgo his remaining eligibility and enter the 2017 NFL draft. He was projected to be a top ten selection and was ranked No. 1 on ESPN analyst Mel Kiper Jr.’s big board. Garrett attended the NFL Scouting Combine in Indianapolis and completed the majority of combine drills, but opted to skip the three-cone drill and short shuttle. Garrett solidified his position as a top ten pick with an impressive combine performance. His 41” vertical jump was the top performance of all defensive linemen, and he also finished with the second-best performance in the bench press and broad jump. Garrett also had the third fastest 40-yard dash of all defensive linemen at the combine, which highly impressed scouts due to his size. On March 30, 2017, Garrett attended Texas A&M's Pro Day and chose to perform the 40-yard dash (4.65s), 20-yard dash (2.71), 10-yard dash (1.57s), and broad jump (10’6”).

External videos
- Myles Garrett NFL combine workout
- Myles Garrett 40-yard dash

Garrett attended pre-draft visits with the Jacksonville Jaguars, San Francisco 49ers, and Chicago Bears. At the conclusion of pre-draft process, Garrett was projected by NFL draft analyst and scouts to be the first overall player selected. He was ranked the top overall prospect and defensive end by Sports Illustrated, ESPN, Pro Football Focus, and DraftScout.com. Garrett was also ranked the top edge rusher in the draft by NFL analyst Mike Mayock.

Pre-draft measurables
| Height | Weight | Arm length | Hand span | Wingspan | 40-yard dash | 10-yard split | 20-yard split | Vertical jump | Broad jump | Bench press | Wonderlic |
|---|---|---|---|---|---|---|---|---|---|---|---|
| 6 ft 4 1/2 in (1.94 m) | 272 lb (123 kg) | 35 1/4 in (0.90 m) | 10 1/4 in (0.26 m) | 6 ft 10 5/8 in (2.10 m) | 4.64 s | 1.63 s | 2.68 s | 41 in (1.04 m) | 10 ft 8 in (3.25 m) | 33 reps | 31 |
All values from NFL Combine and Texas A&M Pro Day

=== Cleveland Browns ===
==== 2017 ====
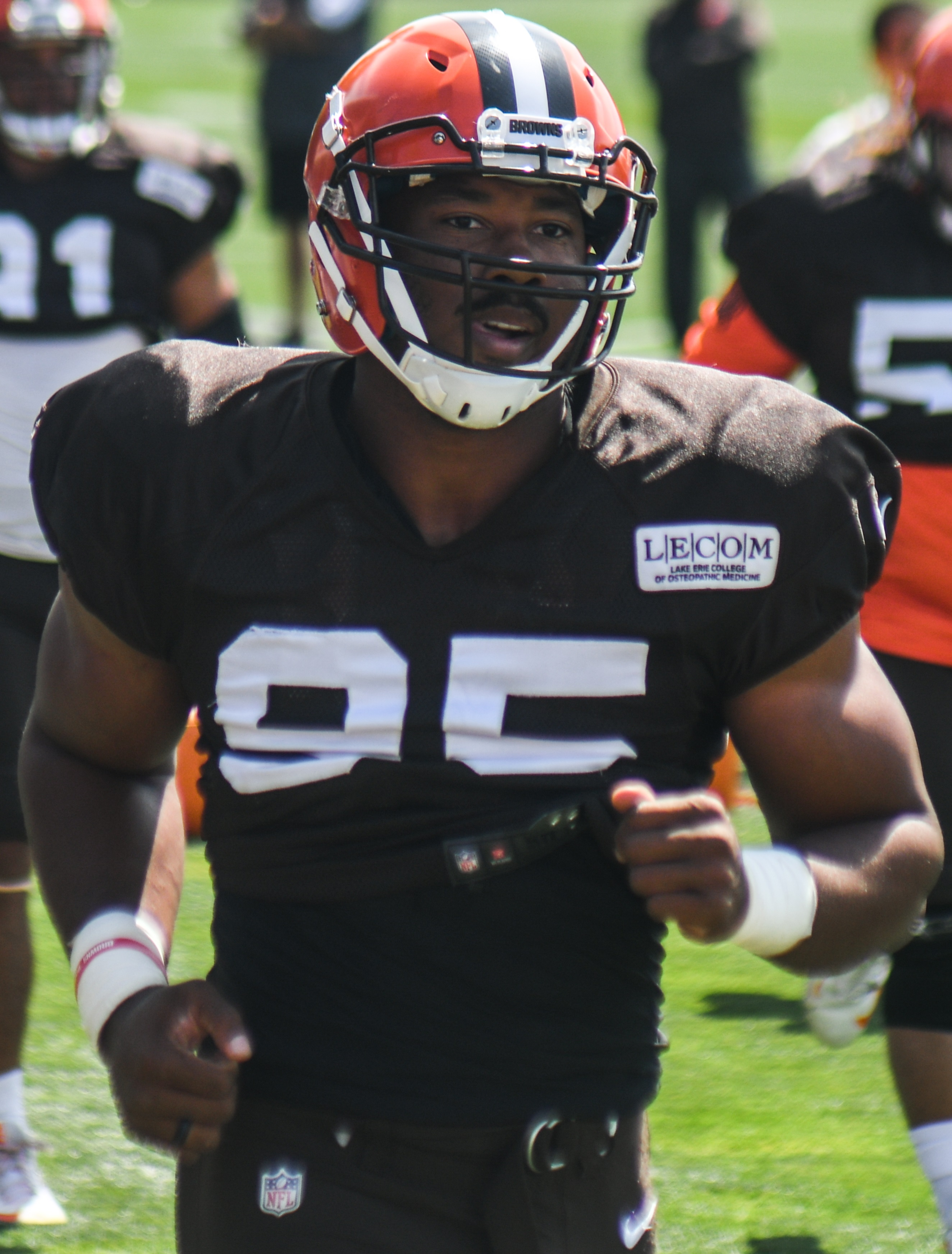
Garrett at training camp in 2017

The Cleveland Browns selected Garrett with the first overall pick of the 2017 NFL draft. Garrett became the highest draft pick from Texas A&M in the history of the NFL draft.

On May 19, 2017, the Browns signed Garrett to a fully guaranteed four-year, $30.41 million contract that features a $20.25 million signing bonus, offset language options, and a team option for a fifth year.

Garrett entered training camp slated as a starting defensive end. Head coach Hue Jackson named Garrett and Emmanuel Ogbah the starting defensive ends to begin the regular season. They started the season alongside defensive tackles Trevon Coley and Jamie Meder.

On September 7, Garrett suffered a high ankle sprain during practice, causing him to miss the start of the season. After missing the first four games, Garrett played his first regular season game on October 8 against the New York Jets, and sacked Josh McCown twice, including once on his first ever NFL play. The Browns lost to the Jets 17–14. Despite having four sacks in his first three games, Garrett's injury woes continued as he suffered a concussion during Week 8 against the Tennessee Titans. Because he was on concussion protocol, he could not travel to London for the next game.

Overall, Garrett recorded 31 combined tackles (19 solo), seven sacks, a forced fumble, a pass defensed, and a fumble recovery during his rookie season. Due to injury, Garrett only played 11 of 16 games, but still finished first on the team in sacks. He was named to the PFWA All-Rookie Team.

==== 2018 ====
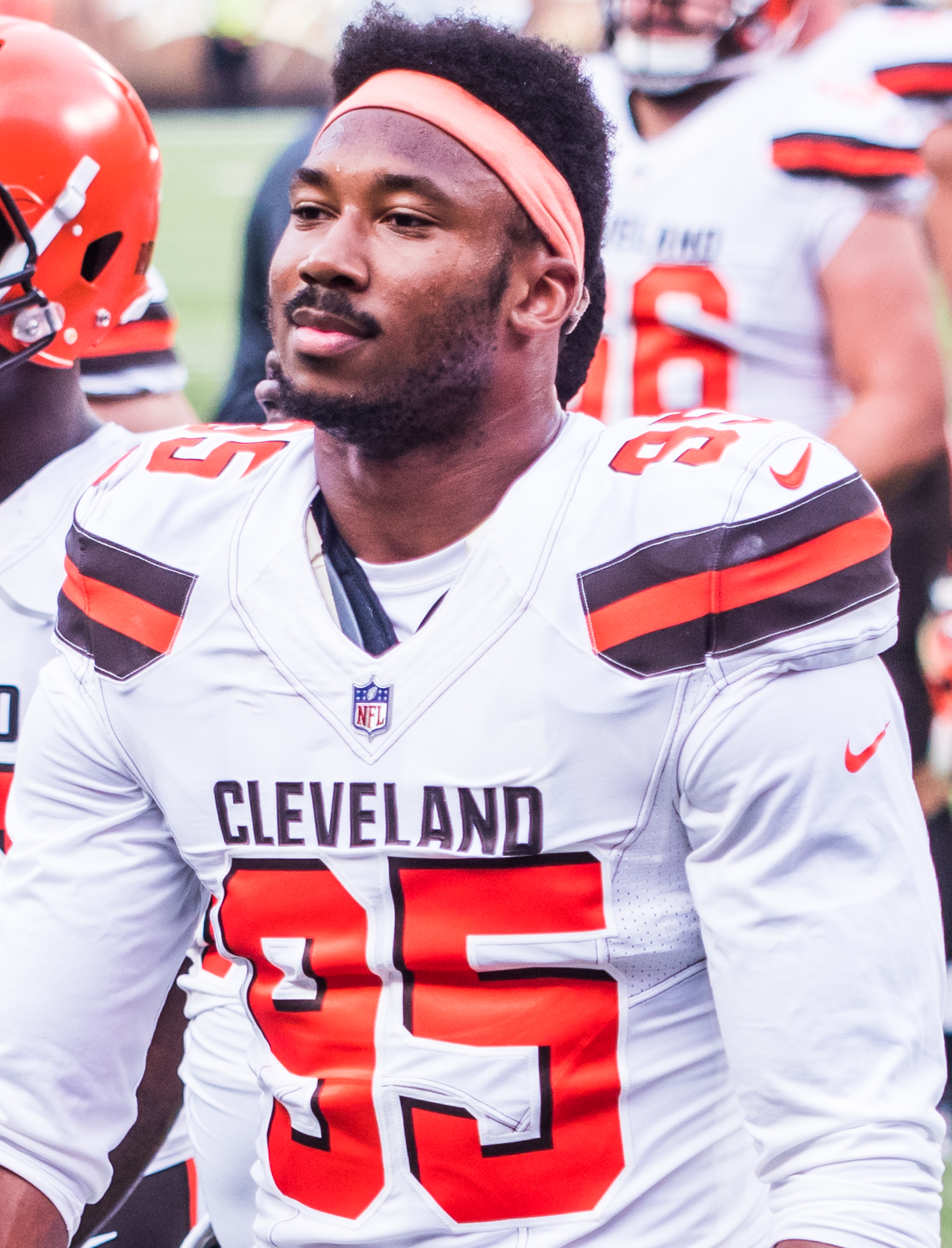
Garrett in 2018

Garrett was named a defensive captain for the 2018 season. In the season-opener against the Pittsburgh Steelers, Garrett sacked Ben Roethlisberger twice and forced two fumbles, both of which were recovered by the Browns, during the 21–21 tie game. Two weeks later against the Jets, Garrett sacked rookie quarterback Sam Darnold twice during the 21–17 win. During Week 7 against the Tampa Bay Buccaneers, Garrett sacked Jameis Winston twice in the 26–23 overtime road loss.

In the 2018 season, Garrett started all 16 games and recorded 13.5 sacks, 44 combined tackles, 12 tackles-for-loss, 29 quarterback hits, three passes defensed, and three forced fumbles. His 13.5 sacks ranked sixth in the NFL that year. He was ranked 49th by his fellow players on the NFL Top 100 Players of 2019. He was named to his first Pro Bowl for his efforts in the 2018 season.

==== 2019 ====
During the season opener against the Titans, Garrett sacked Marcus Mariota twice in the 43–13 loss. In the next game against the Jets, Garrett finished with three sacks but also committed two roughing the passer penalties as the Browns won 23–3. On September 28, Garrett was fined a combined $52,639 for three fouls, a face mask hit on Delanie Walker as well as the two roughing the passer fouls on Trevor Siemian, the second of which resulted in Siemian injuring his ankle and putting him on injured reserve. During Week 6 against the Seattle Seahawks, Garrett sacked Russell Wilson twice in the 32–28 loss.

===== Brawl with Mason Rudolph =====
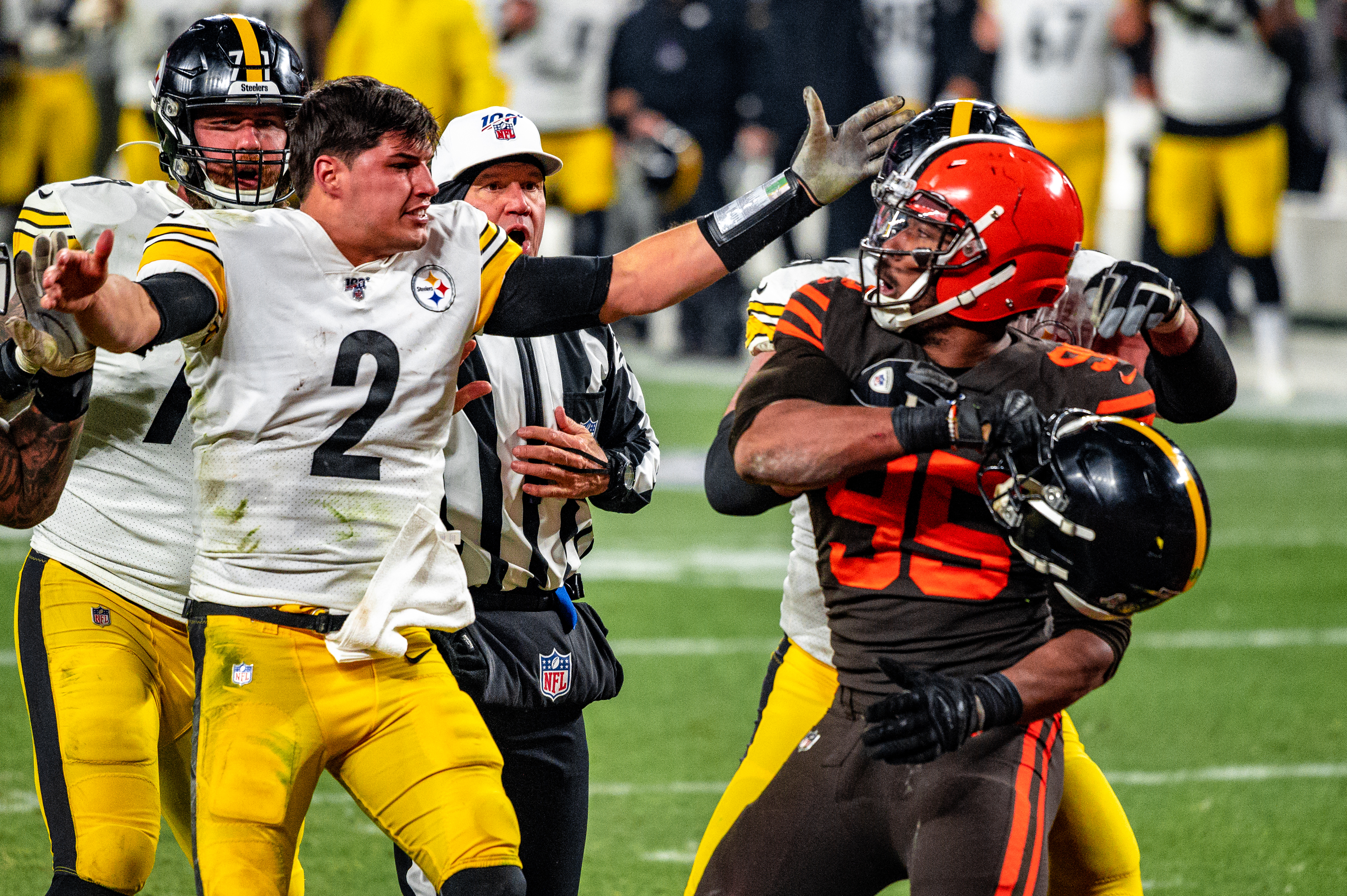
Mason Rudolph (left) reacts after being hit by Garrett

During Week 11 against the Steelers, with eight seconds left in regulation, Garrett pulled Steelers quarterback Mason Rudolph to the ground following a late hit. The players briefly wrestled on the ground, with Rudolph tugging on Garrett's helmet. After getting back up, Garrett pulled Rudolph up by his helmet and then forcibly removed it as Steelers offensive linemen Maurkice Pouncey and David DeCastro tried to hold him back. Garrett then swung Rudolph's helmet at him, striking him in the head with the bottom of the helmet. A fight ensued that resulted in Garrett, Pouncey, and Browns defensive tackle Larry Ogunjobi being ejected; Pouncey punched and kicked towards Garrett's head several times after the strike, while Ogunjobi pushed a helmetless Rudolph to the ground as he stood watching the fight.

Garrett's actions were questioned by his head coach and quarterback in interviews conducted immediately after the game. Browns quarterback Baker Mayfield called Garrett's action "inexcusable," while Browns head coach Freddie Kitchens expressed embarrassment. Garrett later apologized for his actions, which he described as "foolish" and "out of character," while at the same time thanking the players who had backed him up. The next day, the NFL suspended Garrett indefinitely, and at a minimum for the remainder of the 2019 season. He was also fined $45,623 while Rudolph was fined $50,000. Another 33 players were each fined $3,000 for entering a fight zone, and the Browns and Steelers organizations were fined $250,000 each. Garrett appealed the suspension, but it was upheld. He sat out the remainder of the season. It was the second-longest suspension for on-field misconduct in NFL history and the longest for a single incident. (Oakland Raiders’ linebacker Vontaze Burfict was suspended for 12 games in 2019 due to a history of violations of player safety rules.)

ESPN reported that in his appeal hearing Garrett had told NFL officials the incident was fueled by Rudolph's alleged use of a racial slur. In a statement, Garrett said he had not intended for his remarks to become public and that hearing the alleged slur was no excuse for his actions. Rudolph vehemently denied the accusation.

Garrett met with officials from Commissioner Roger Goodell's office on February 10, 2020, and was reinstated for the 2020 season. After being reinstated, Garrett reiterated his claim, saying he discussed the alleged slur immediately after the altercation with former general manager John Dorsey, head coach Freddie Kitchens, and Ogunjobi, his best friend. This was confirmed by Dorsey and Ogunjobi. Garrett asked the NFL to check their on-field audio; league spokesman Brian McCarthy said there were no recordings, and therefore they "found no such evidence" to support Garrett's claim.

==== 2020 ====
Garrett was reinstated from suspension on February 12, 2020. On April 27, the Browns exercised the fifth-year option on his contract. Garrett signed a five-year, $125 million contract extension with the team on July 15.

During Week 2 against the Cincinnati Bengals, Garrett recorded a strip sack on rookie quarterback Joe Burrow which was recovered by the Browns during the 35–30 win. In Week 3 against the Washington Football Team, Garrett sacked Dwayne Haskins twice, including a strip sack that was recovered by himself during the 34–20 win. In a Week 4 game against the Dallas Cowboys, Garrett sacked Dak Prescott twice, one of which was a strip sack that resulted in a turnover, during the 49–38 road victory. His performance earned him AFC Defensive Player of the Week.

In Week 7 against the Cincinnati Bengals, Garrett sacked Joe Burrow two more times and forced a fumble that was recovered by the Browns during the 37–34 win. As the month closed, Garrett won AFC Defensive Player of the Month for October after compiling six sacks, 14 tackles, four for a loss, and two forced fumbles. On November 20, 2020, Garrett was placed on the reserve/COVID-19 list missing the Browns Week 11 game against the Philadelphia Eagles. He was activated from the reserve/COVID-19 list on December 1. Garrett was named to the Pro Bowl.

Garrett was selected for the 2020 All-Pro Team, along with three of his teammates: tackle Jack Conklin and guards Joel Bitonio and Wyatt Teller. He was ranked 16th by his fellow players on the NFL Top 100 Players of 2021.

==== 2021 ====
In Week 3 against the Chicago Bears, Garrett recorded 4.5 sacks against Bears’ rookie quarterback Justin Fields. He broke the franchise record for most sacks in a single game, previously held by Andra Davis. The Browns went on to win 26–6. His performance earned him AFC Defensive Player of the Week. In a Week 12 game against the Baltimore Ravens, Garrett sacked Lamar Jackson for his 14th sack of the season, tying Reggie Camp’s franchise record for most sacks in a season. In a Week 14 game against the Ravens, Garrett strip sacked Tyler Huntley, recovered the ball, and returned it for his first NFL touchdown. This was his 15th sack of the season, setting a new franchise record.

During Week 14, Garrett became the first Browns player to receive a 99 rating in the Madden NFL video game, specifically in Madden NFL 22.

Garrett had an extremely productive season, posting 16 sacks and 51 combined tackles, both career highs. He was named a starter in the 2022 Pro Bowl, as well as earning a first-team selection on the 2021 All-Pro Team. He was ranked 11th by his fellow players on the NFL Top 100 Players of 2022.

==== 2022 ====
In the 2022 season, Garrett finished with 16 sacks, 60 total tackles (37 solo), four passes defended, and two forced fumbles. He was named as a Pro Bowler for his efforts in the 2022 season. Garrett finished fifth in Defensive Player of the Year voting. He was ranked 20th by his fellow players on the NFL Top 100 Players of 2023.

==== 2023 ====
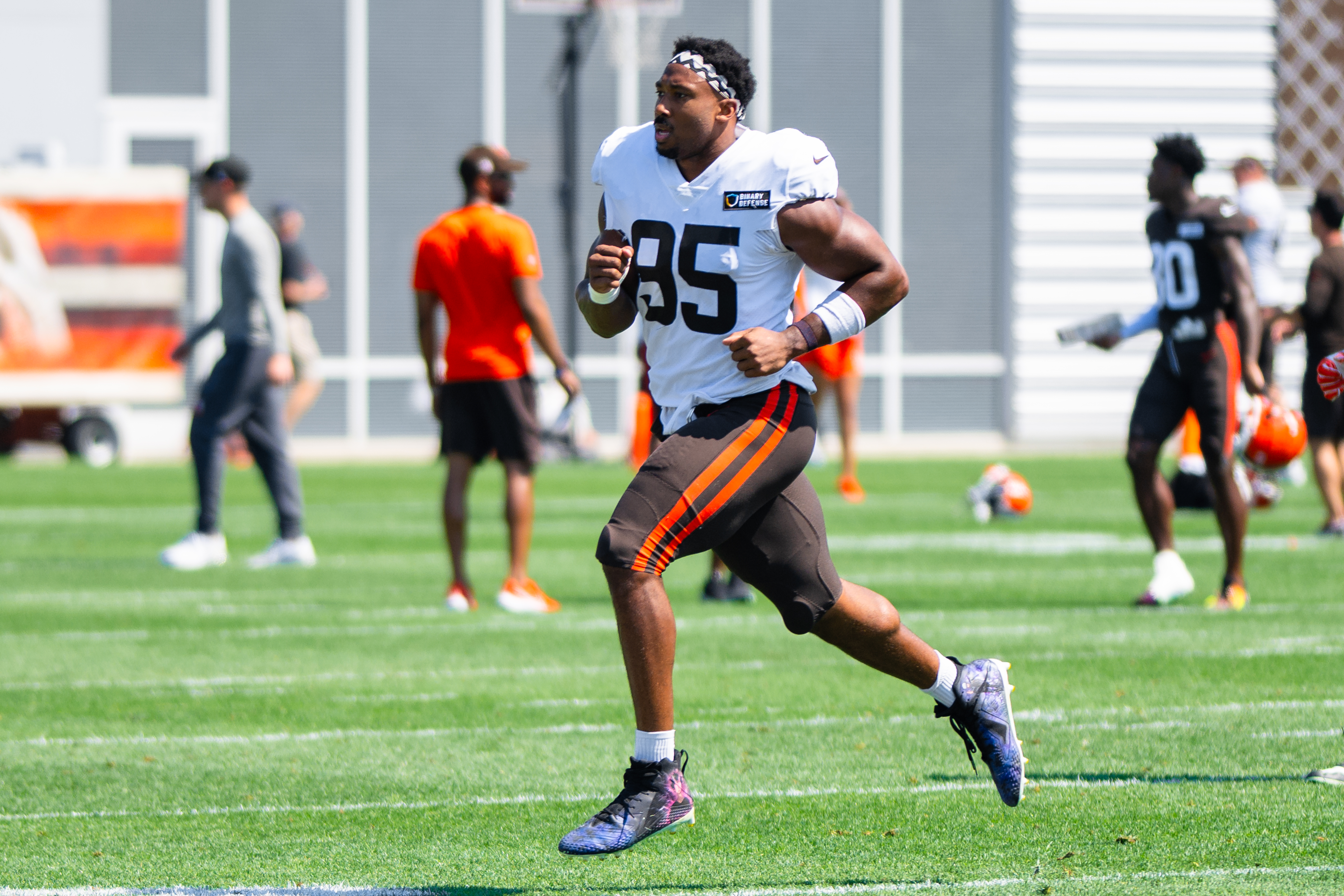
Garrett in August 2023

During Week 7, Garrett recorded nine tackles, two sacks, two forced fumbles, and a blocked field goal in a narrow 39–38 victory over the Colts, earning AFC Defensive Player of the Week honors. All totaled, he finished the regular season with 14 sacks, earning his fifth Pro Bowl and third first-team All-Pro selections. At the 13th Annual NFL Honors, Garrett was named Defensive Player of the Year. He earned this award for the first time after leading the NFL's best defensive team and forcing a career-high four fumbles. Garrett was ranked fifth by his fellow players on the NFL Top 100 Players of 2024.

==== 2024 ====
During Week 9 against the Chargers, Garrett had three sacks in the loss. Three weeks later, he recorded three sacks, a forced fumble, and five tackles in a 24–19 victory over the Steelers, earning AFC Defensive Player of the Week. Garrett finished the 2024 season with 14 sacks, 47 tackles, a pass defended, three forced fumbles, and one fumble recovery. He led the NFL in tackles-for-loss with 22. Garrett earned his sixth Pro Bowl nomination and fourth first team All-Pro nomination. He was ranked eighth by his fellow players on the NFL Top 100 Players of 2025.

==== 2025 ====
After Cleveland finished with a 3–14 record in 2024, Garrett requested a trade on February 3, 2025, citing a "desire to win." After the Browns' front office expressed their unwillingness to trade Garrett, they eventually agreed on a four-year, $160 million extension on March 9, with $123.5 million guaranteed and an average salary of $40 million per year. The extension also included a no-trade clause, keeping him with the Browns through the 2030 NFL season.

During Week 8 against the New England Patriots, Garrett set a new franchise record by recording five sacks in a single game, but the Browns went on to lose 32–13. During a Week 12 game against the Las Vegas Raiders, Garrett had three sacks, bringing his season total to 18 and breaking his own single-season franchise record for sacks in the process. For his game against the Raiders, he earned AFC Defensive Player of the Week. He was named AFC Defensive Player of the Month for November. In the final week of the season against the Bengals, Garrett recorded his 23rd sack of the season to break the NFL single-season sack record of 22.5 shared by Michael Strahan and T. J. Watt after sacking Joe Burrow. His 33 tackles for loss were the second most in NFL history since the statistic became official. Garrett was named first team All-Pro for the fifth time and earned a seventh career Pro Bowl nomination. Garrett won Defensive Player of the Year for the 2025 season. He joined J. J. Watt as the only players in NFL history to win the award unanimously. Additionally, he became one of nine players in NFL history to win multiple Defensive Player of the Year awards. Garrett was ranked first by his fellow players on the NFL Top 100 Players of 2026.

=== Los Angeles Rams ===
On June 1, 2026, Garrett was traded to the Los Angeles Rams in exchange for Jared Verse, a 2027 first-round pick, a 2028 second-round pick, and a 2029 third-round pick. At an introductory press conference the following day, it was confirmed that Garrett would wear No. 95, which he had done throughout his professional career. Following the trade, the Rams and Garrett agreed on a restructured five-year, $208.2 million deal, with $37 million fully guaranteed in 2026 and $99 million guaranteed through the 2028 season.

After missing most of training camp and sitting out the preseason, Garrett made his first start for the Rams in Week 1 against San Francisco in Melbourne, Australia, but did not make a tackle, sack, or record any defensive statistics in a 24-7 loss to the 49ers. On September 13, 2026, Garrett was placed on injured reserve in preparation for arthroscopic surgery on his knee.

Garrett was activated on November 7, and rejoined the Rams' starting lineup in Week 9 at Washington. Lining up for the first time alongside fellow All-Pro Aaron Donald, he had three sacks and a forced fumble in the Rams' 20-13 win over the Commanders.

== Career statistics ==
Legend
| | NFL Defensive Player of the Year |
| | NFL record |
| | Led the league |
| **Bold** | Career high |

=== NFL ===
==== Regular season ====
| Year | Team | Games | | Tackles | | | | | Interceptions | | | | | | Fumbles | | |
| Year | Team | GP | GS | Cmb | Solo | Ast | Sck | TFL | PD | Int | Yds | Avg | Lng | TD | FF | FR | TD |
|---|---|---|---|---|---|---|---|---|---|---|---|---|---|---|---|---|---|
| 2017 | CLE | 11 | 9 | 31 | 19 | 12 | 7.0 | 9 | 1 | 0 | 0 | 0.0 | 0 | 0 | 1 | 1 | 0 |
| 2018 | CLE | 16 | 16 | 44 | 35 | 9 | 13.5 | 12 | 3 | 0 | 0 | 0.0 | 0 | 0 | 3 | 0 | 0 |
| 2019 | CLE | 10 | 10 | 29 | 20 | 9 | 10.0 | 11 | 0 | 0 | 0 | 0.0 | 0 | 0 | 2 | 0 | 0 |
| 2020 | CLE | 14 | 14 | 48 | 33 | 15 | 12.0 | 10 | 2 | 0 | 0 | 0.0 | 0 | 0 | **4** | **2** | 0 |
| 2021 | CLE | 17 | 17 | 51 | 33 | 18 | 16.0 | 17 | 3 | 0 | 0 | 0.0 | 0 | 0 | 1 | 1 | **1** |
| 2022 | CLE | 16 | 15 | **60** | 37 | **23** | 16.0 | 18 | **4** | 0 | 0 | 0.0 | 0 | 0 | 2 | 0 | 0 |
| 2023 | CLE | 16 | 16 | 42 | 33 | 9 | 14.0 | 17 | 3 | 0 | 0 | 0.0 | 0 | 0 | **4** | 1 | 0 |
| 2024 | CLE | 17 | 17 | 47 | 40 | 7 | 14.0 | 22 | 1 | 0 | 0 | 0.0 | 0 | 0 | 3 | 1 | 0 |
| 2025 | CLE | 17 | 17 | **60** | **43** | 17 | **23.0** | **33** | 1 | 0 | 0 | 0.0 | 0 | 0 | 3 | 0 | 0 |
| 2026 | LAR | 3 | 3 | 3 | 3 | 0 | 3.0 | 3 | 0 | 0 | 0 | 0.0 | 0 | 0 | 1 | 0 | 0 |
| Career | | 137 | 134 | 415 | 296 | 119 | 128.5 | 152 | 18 | 0 | 0 | 0.0 | 0 | 0 | 24 | 6 | 1 |

==== Postseason ====
| Year | Team | Games | | Tackles | | | | | Interceptions | | | | | | Fumbles | | |
| Year | Team | GP | GS | Cmb | Solo | Ast | Sck | TFL | PD | Int | Yds | Avg | Lng | TD | FF | FR | TD |
|---|---|---|---|---|---|---|---|---|---|---|---|---|---|---|---|---|---|
| 2020 | CLE | 2 | 2 | **3** | **3** | 0 | **1.0** | **1** | — | — | — | — | — | — | 0 | 0 | 0 |
| 2023 | CLE | 1 | 1 | **3** | 2 | **1** | 0.0 | 0 | — | — | — | — | — | — | 0 | 0 | 0 |
| Career | | 3 | 3 | 6 | 5 | 1 | 1.0 | 1 | 0 | 0 | 0 | 0.0 | 0 | 0 | 0 | 0 | 0 |

=== College ===
| Year | Team | GP | Tackles | | | | | Interceptions | | | | | Fumbles | | | |
| Year | Team | GP | Cmb | Solo | Ast | TFL | Sck | Int | Yds | Avg | TD | PD | FF | FR | Yds | TD |
|---|---|---|---|---|---|---|---|---|---|---|---|---|---|---|---|---|
| 2014 | Texas A&M | 12 | 53 | 29 | **24** | 14.0 | 11.5 | 0 | 0 | — | 0 | 1 | 0 | 0 | 0 | 0 |
| 2015 | Texas A&M | 13 | **59** | **37** | 22 | **19.5** | **12.5** | **1** | **4** | **4.0** | 0 | **2** | **5** | 0 | 0 | 0 |
| 2016 | Texas A&M | 11 | 33 | 18 | 15 | 15.0 | 8.5 | 0 | 0 | — | 0 | 1 | 2 | **1** | 0 | 0 |
| Career | | 36 | 145 | 84 | 61 | 48.5 | 32.5 | 1 | 4 | 4.0 | 0 | 4 | 7 | 1 | 0 | 0 |

== Personal life ==
Garrett's half-brother, Sean Williams, was a standout basketball player for Boston College and was selected with pick number 17 in the first round of the 2007 NBA draft by the New Jersey Nets. He then played in the NBA from 2007 to 2012. Brea Garrett, his older sister, was a track and field athlete at Texas A&M. She won the 2014 NCAA title in the 20-pound weight throw, and is the first weight throw champion in Aggie history.

During the 2015 offseason, Garrett decided to stop using his social media account on Twitter, citing: "There's a lot of negativity on there I don’t need in my life. I felt like If I want to move forward as a person and as a football player, I don’t need other people's opinions and other things to stick with me or be in my mind when I have other things to keep doing." Garrett later resumed using Twitter regularly. Garrett also writes poetry and was working on a dinosaur book for children.

On April 30, 2017, two days after the 2017 NFL draft, Garrett, along with fellow first rounders Jabrill Peppers and David Njoku, were at Progressive Field, and threw out a ceremonial first pitch.

On September 28, 2021, a mural of Garrett (as a young child) and his grandmother Juanita was unveiled in the Playhouse Square district in downtown Cleveland.

On September 26, 2022, Garrett was involved in a one-car crash leaving the team facility. The incident occurred near Wadsworth, Ohio. He suffered minor injuries and was released from the hospital the same day.

On October 25, 2023, it was announced Garrett had purchased a minority ownership stake in the Cleveland Cavaliers of the National Basketball Association (NBA). Along with his ownership stake, Garrett serves as an ambassador for the team.

As of 2025, Garrett is in a relationship with Olympic gold medalist snowboarder Chloe Kim.
