= Landry Award =

High school football award in Dallas-Fort Worth, U.S.

The Landry Award is an honor given annually to the top high school football player in North Texas. The award was established in 2010 and named after legendary former Dallas Cowboys coach Tom Landry. It is awarded by Dallas-Fort Worth CBS affiliate KTVT in conjunction with the Fellowship of Christian Athletes.

== Award winners ==
Year	Player	Position	High School	College
2010	Johnathan Gray	RB	Aledo	Texas
2011	Johnathan Gray	RB	Aledo	Texas
2012	Jake Oliver	WR	Dallas Jesuit	Texas
2013	Myles Garrett	DE	Arlington Martin	Texas A&M
2014	Kyler Murray	QB	Allen	Texas A&M / Oklahoma
2015	Jett Duffey	QB	Mansfield Lake Ridge	Texas Tech / Hampton
2016	Kennedy Brooks	RB	Mansfield	Oklahoma
2017	John Stephen Jones	QB	Highland Park	Arkansas
2018	T.J. McDaniel	RB	Southlake Carroll	SMU
2019	Jaxon Smith-Njigba	WR	Rockwall	Ohio State
2020	JoJo Earle	WR	Aledo	Alabama / TCU / UNLV
2021	Josh Hoover	QB	Rockwall-Heath	TCU
2022	Jackson Arnold	QB	Denton Guyer	Oklahoma / Auburn
