= JoJo Earle =

American football player (born 2003)

No. 5 – Tucson Sugar Skulls
- Position: Wide receiver

Personal information
- Born: April 5, 2003 (age 23)
- Listed height: 5 ft 9 in (1.75 m)
- Listed weight: 185 lb (84 kg)

Career information
- High school: Aledo (Aledo, Texas)
- College: Alabama (2021–2022); TCU (2023–2024); UNLV (2025)
- NFL draft: 2026: undrafted

Career history
- Tucson Sugar Skulls (2026–present)

Awards and highlights
- Landry Award (2020)
- Stats at ESPN

JoJo Earle (born April 5, 2003) is an American football wide receiver for the Tucson Sugar Skulls of the Indoor Football League (IFL). He played college football for the Alabama Crimson Tide, TCU Horned Frogs and the UNLV Rebels.

== Early life ==
Earle grew up in Aledo, Texas and attended Aledo High School. He caught 84 passes for 1,601 yards and 15 touchdowns and also rushed for 429 yards and 11 touchdowns as a junior. Earle won the Landry Award as a senior after catching 61 passes for 1,007 yards and eight touchdowns and also rushing 87 times for 591 yards and 12 touchdowns. Earle was rated a four-star recruit and initially committed to play college football at LSU during his junior year. He later flipped his commitment to Alabama.

== College career ==
=== Alabama ===
Earle caught 12 passes for 148 yards during his freshman season at Alabama. He suffered a broken foot during summer training camp entering his sophomore year. Earle returned after missing the first four games of the season. He ultimately played in eight games and had 12 receptions for 155 yards and two touchdowns. Following the end of the season, Earle entered the NCAA transfer portal.

=== TCU ===
Earle ultimately transferred to Texas Christian University.

=== UNLV ===
On December 26 2024, Earle decided to transfer to UNLV.

== Professional career ==
Pre-draft measurables
Height	Weight	Arm length	Hand span	Wingspan	40-yard dash	10-yard split	20-yard split	20-yard shuttle	Three-cone drill	Vertical jump	Broad jump	Bench press
5 ft 9 1/3 in (1.76 m)	182 lb (83 kg)	29 1/2 in (0.75 m)	8 3/4 in (0.22 m)	6 ft 1 3/8 in (1.86 m)	4.53 s	1.55 s	2.59 s	4.28 s	7.27 s	35.5 in (0.90 m)	10 ft 0 in (3.05 m)	11 reps
All values from Pro Day
