= Canaan Smith-Njigba =

American baseball player (born 1999)

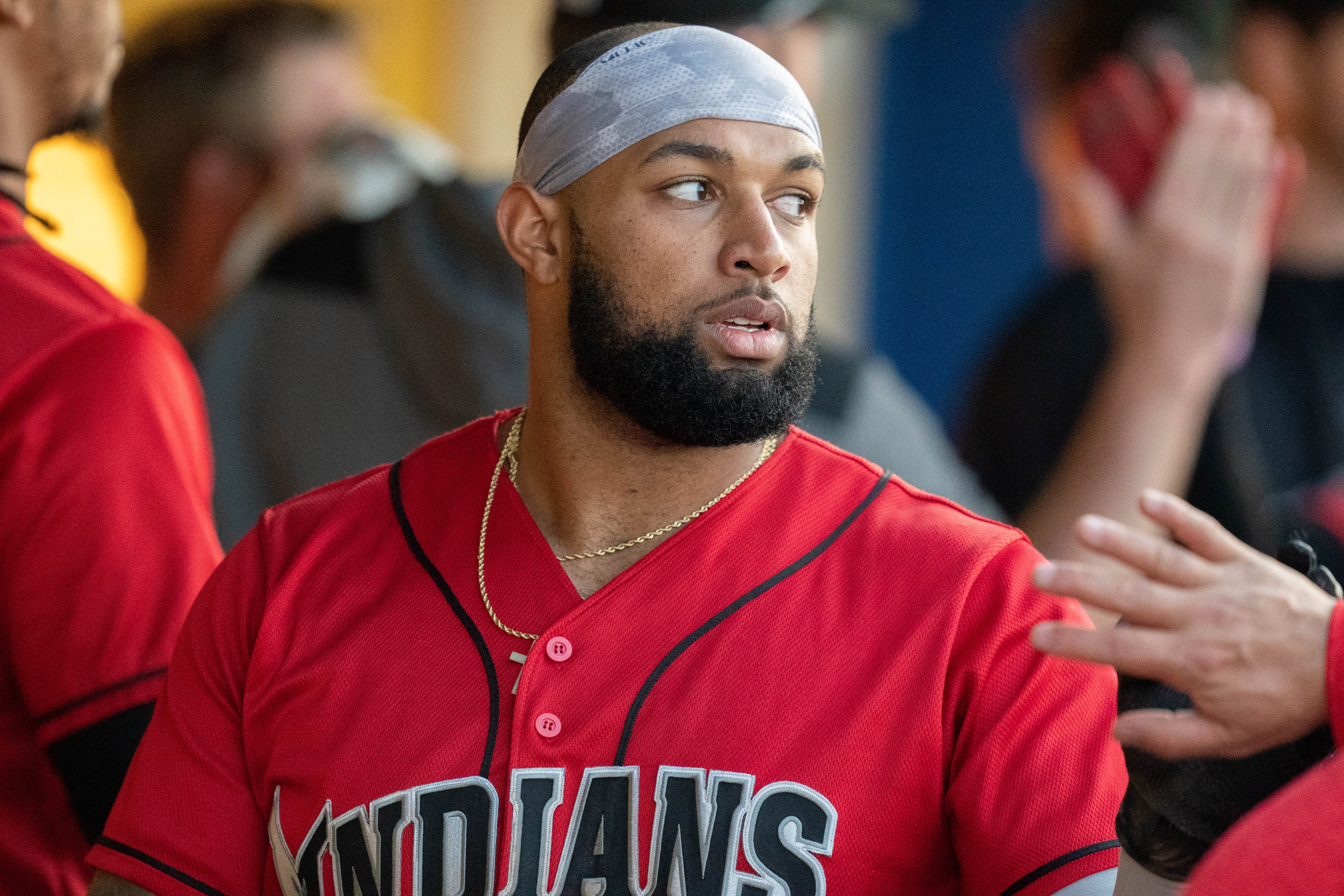
- Smith-Njigba with the Indianapolis Indians in 2022
- Outfielder
- Born: April 30, 1999 (age 27); Dallas, Texas, U.S.
- Batted: Left Threw: Right

MLB debut
- June 14, 2022, for the Pittsburgh Pirates

Last MLB appearance
- June 9, 2023, for the Pittsburgh Pirates

MLB statistics
- Batting average: .135
- Home runs: 0
- Runs batted in: 5
- Stats at Baseball Reference

Teams
- Pittsburgh Pirates (2022–2023)

Canaan Elijah Smith-Njigba (born April 30, 1999) is an American former professional baseball outfielder. He played in Major League Baseball (MLB) for the Pittsburgh Pirates.

== Amateur career ==
Smith-Njigba attended Rockwall-Heath High School in Heath, Texas, where he played baseball. He committed to play college baseball at the University of Arkansas. During his senior year, he garnered attention after he was intentionally walked 32 times in 24 games, or a rate of 1.33 per game. After his senior season, he was selected by the New York Yankees in the fourth round of the 2017 Major League Baseball draft.

== Professional career ==
=== New York Yankees ===
After signing with the Yankees, Smith-Njigba made his professional debut with the Rookie-level Gulf Coast League Yankees, where he hit .289/.430/.422 with five home runs and 28 RBIs over 57 games. In 2018, he played with the Staten Island Yankees of the Low-A New York–Penn League where he hit .191 with three home runs and 16 RBIs over 45 games, missing time due to injury. In 2019, he played for the Charleston RiverDogs of the Single-A South Atlantic League, with whom he earned All-Star honors. Over 124 games, he batted .307/.405/.465 with 11 home runs, 74 RBIs, and 16 stolen bases. He did not play in 2020 due to the cancellation of the minor league season because of the COVID-19 pandemic.

=== Pittsburgh Pirates ===
On January 24, 2021, the Yankees traded Smith-Njigba (alongside Miguel Yajure, Roansy Contreras, and Maikol Escotto) to the Pittsburgh Pirates for pitcher Jameson Taillon. Smith-Njigba was assigned to the Altoona Curve of the Double-A Northeast for a majority of the 2021 season. He was placed on the injured list briefly at the end of July but activated in early August. He was placed back on the injured list in mid-August with a thigh injury but was activated one month later. Over 66 games, he hit .274/.398/.406 with six home runs, 40 RBI, and 13 stolen bases. Following the end of Altoona's season in mid-September, he was promoted to the Indianapolis Indians of the Triple-A East with whom he appeared in seven games. He was selected to play in the Arizona Fall League for the Peoria Javelinas after the season. On November 19, 2021, the Pirates selected his contract and added him to their 40-man roster, protecting him from the Rule 5 draft. He returned to the Indians to begin the 2022 season.

On June 13, 2022, the Pirates promoted Smith-Njigba to the major leagues. He registered his first major league hit the next night with a pinch-hit double off of St. Louis Cardinals relief pitcher Giovanny Gallegos. He played in three games, going 1-for-5. On June 17, he was placed on the 60-day injured list with a wrist fracture following an outfield collision with teammate Bryan Reynolds.

In 2023, Smith-Njigba played in 15 games for Pittsburgh, going 4-for-32 (.125) with no home runs, five RBI, and one stolen base. He was designated for assignment by the Pirates on January 31, 2024.

On February 7, 2024, Smith-Njigba was claimed off waivers by the Seattle Mariners. Ten days later, on February 17, he was designated for assignment. On February 19, he returned to the Pirates on another waiver claim. Smith-Njigba was optioned to Triple-A Indianapolis to begin the 2024 season. However, he was designated for assignment following multiple roster moves on March 28. Smith-Njigba cleared waivers and was sent outright to Triple-A Indianapolis on March 31. He made 54 appearances for Indianapolis, hitting .212/.344/.330 with two home runs, 18 RBI, and six stolen bases. Smith-Njigba was released by the Pirates organization on July 6.

=== Chicago White Sox ===
On August 7, 2024, Smith-Njigba signed a minor league contract with the Chicago White Sox organization. He hit .182 with one home run, six RBI, and one stolen base in 16 appearances for the Double-A Birmingham Barons; he was later promoted to the Triple-A Charlotte Knights, for whom he hit .261 with two RBI and three stolen bases across eight games. Smith-Njigba elected free agency following the season on November 4.

== Personal life ==
Smith-Njigba is the older brother of Seattle Seahawks wide receiver Jaxon Smith-Njigba.

Smith-Njigba's paternal grandparents are from Sierra Leone.
