= Jaxon Smith-Njigba =

American football player (born 2002)

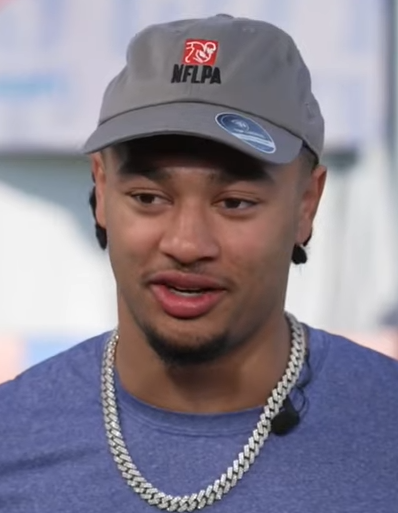
- Smith-Njigba in 2023

No. 11 – Seattle Seahawks
- Position: Wide receiver
- Roster status: Active

Personal information
- Born: February 14, 2002 (age 24); Nacogdoches, Texas, U.S.
- Listed height: 6 ft 1 in (1.85 m)
- Listed weight: 197 lb (89 kg)

Career information
- High school: Rockwall (Rockwall, Texas)
- College: Ohio State (2020–2022)
- NFL draft: 2023: 1st round, 20th overall pick

Career history
- Seattle Seahawks (2023–present)

Awards and highlights
- Super Bowl champion (LX); NFL Offensive Player of the Year (2025); First-team All-Pro (2025); 2× Pro Bowl (2024, 2025); NFL receiving yards leader (2025); Rose Bowl Offensive MVP (2022); Third-team All-American (2021); Third-team All-Big Ten (2021)

Career NFL statistics as of Week 10, 2026
- Receptions: 361
- Receiving yards: 4,758
- Receiving average: 13.2
- Receiving touchdowns: 30
- Stats at Pro Football Reference

Jaxon Smith-Njigba (/ɪnˈdʒɪɡbə/ in-JIG-bə; born February 14, 2002), also known by his initials JSN, is an American professional football wide receiver for the Seattle Seahawks of the National Football League (NFL). He played college football for the Ohio State Buckeyes, setting school records for receptions in a single game (15, twice) and receiving yards in a season (1,606 in 2021). Smith-Njigba was selected 20th overall by the Seahawks in the first round of the 2023 NFL draft. He became a starter in his second season, amassing 1,130 receiving yards and earning his first Pro Bowl selection. In the 2025 season, Smith-Njigba set a Seahawks franchise record with a league-leading 1,793 receiving yards on 119 receptions, earning him Offensive Player of the Year (OPOY) honors. That same season, he helped the Seahawks win Super Bowl LX.

== Early life ==
Smith-Njigba was born on February 14, 2002, in Nacogdoches, Texas, to firefighter Maada and high school teacher Jami Smith, and grew up in Rockwall, Texas, attending Rockwall High School. He is of half white and Sierra Leonean descent; his paternal grandparents are from Sierra Leone. He also has Nigerian heritage. After Maada and Jami divorced, Maada began putting Jaxon and his older brother Canaan through daily sports workouts as a means of bonding with and passing the time with his sons, sometimes starting at 6 a.m. Although Maada initially only sought to "tire them out" so he could put them to bed, as they grew up, he found himself surprised at their skill. Canaan is a professional baseball player who is currently a free agent.

In his early years, Smith-Njigba only went by "Jaxon Smith." He appended "Njigba" to his surname upon reaching high school to honor his grandfather, John, after he died in 2014; John had changed his name to "Smith" upon immigrating to the United States in the 1970s in order to fit in.

At Rockwall, Smith-Njigba led all high school football players in the Dallas–Fort Worth metroplex with 97 receptions for 1,828 yards and 20 touchdowns in his junior season. As a senior, he caught 104 passes for 2,094 yards and 35 touchdowns and was named the recipient of both the Landry Award and the Texas Gatorade Football Player of the Year award. Smith-Njigba played in the 2019 All-American Bowl and was named a high school All-American by Sports Illustrated and USA Today. Smith-Njigba finished his high school career with 5,346 career receiving yards and 82 touchdowns in 44 games played. A 5 star prospect and the #5 ranked wide receiver in the nation, Smith-Njigba received offers from many top college football programs including Notre Dame, Oklahoma and Ole Miss, before ultimately committing to Ohio State University.

== College career ==
Smith-Njigba played in seven games as a freshman and led Ohio State's freshmen with 10 receptions for 49 yards and one touchdown.

He was named a starter at the slot receiver position for the Buckeyes going into his sophomore season. On November 6, 2021, Smith-Njigba recorded 15 receptions (single game school record) for 240 yards (the second most receiving yards in a game in school history at the time) and one touchdown in a 26–17 win against Nebraska. Later that season, he set both an Ohio State single game and FBS Bowl record for receiving yards with 347 in Ohio State's win in the 2022 Rose Bowl. In that game, he also recorded 15 receptions (tying his own record set in the aforementioned Nebraska game) and passed David Boston for the single season receiving yards record at Ohio State with 1,606.

Smith-Njigba was limited to just three games in 2022 due to a hamstring injury sustained in the beginning of the season, from which he could not return in time for the College Football Playoff. In addition, Smith-Njigba announced that he would forgo his senior year of college and enter the 2023 NFL draft.

== Professional career ==
Pre-draft measurables
Height	Weight	Arm length	Hand span	Wingspan	40-yard dash	10-yard split	20-yard split	20-yard shuttle	Three-cone drill	Vertical jump	Broad jump
6 ft 0 5/8 in (1.84 m)	196 lb (89 kg)	30 1/2 in (0.77 m)	9 in (0.23 m)	6 ft 3 1/2 in (1.92 m)	4.52 s	1.65 s	2.61 s	3.93 s	6.57 s	35.0 in (0.89 m)	10 ft 5 in (3.18 m)
All values from NFL Combine/Pro Day

Smith-Njigba was selected by the Seattle Seahawks in the first round (20th overall) of the 2023 NFL draft.

=== 2023 season ===
He caught his first regular-season NFL pass Week 1 against the Los Angeles Rams with a one-yard completion from Geno Smith. Smith-Njigba started his first game in Week 7 of that year after starter DK Metcalf was sidelined due to a rib injury; during that game, he caught his first career touchdown pass on a 28-yard pass from Smith. On October 29, Smith-Njigba caught the game winning touchdown pass from Smith on screen pass against the Cleveland Browns. On December 18, Smith-Njigba caught the game winning touchdown pass from Drew Lock on Monday Night Football against the Philadelphia Eagles. As a rookie, he appeared in all 17 games and made three starts. He finished with 63 receptions for 628 receiving yards and four receiving touchdowns.

=== 2024 season ===
In the 2024 season during the Week 9 game against the Los Angeles Rams, Smith-Njigba recorded a career high game with seven catches for 180 yards and two touchdowns. He finished the 2024 season with 100 receptions for 1,130 yards and six touchdowns. His 100 total receptions on the season tied Tyler Lockett for the franchise record. Smith-Njigba also made the Pro Bowl for the first time in his career.

=== 2025 season: Offensive Player of the Year and Super Bowl victory ===
In the 2025 season, Smith-Njigba was named NFC Offensive Player Of The Month after recording 24 catches with 417 yards and three touchdowns in October. On November 23, 2025, Smith-Njigba broke the Seahawks single-season receiving yard record in a game against the Tennessee Titans, surpassing DK Metcalf’s previous mark of 1,303 yards.

For the 2025 season, Smith-Njigba led the league in receiving yards with 1,793. Puka Nacua of the Los Angeles Rams finished second with 1,715 yards and the next closest receiver would be George Pickens of the Dallas Cowboys, who was over 300 yards behind Smith-Njigba. He had a receiving touchdown in the Divisional Round against the San Francisco 49ers. In the 2025 NFC Championship Game against the Rams, Smith-Njigba set a season-high in receptions with ten, to go with 153 yards and one touchdown, in the 31–27 victory, propelling Seattle to Super Bowl LX and the franchise’s first NFC title in eleven years.

At season's end, Smith-Njigba was selected to the Pro Bowl, was unanimously named a first-team All-Pro receiver and received the 2025 AP Offensive Player of the Year award. He became just the second Seahawk to win Offensive Player of the Year after Shaun Alexander in 2005. He beat out division rivals Christian McCaffrey and Puka Nacua, as well as Bijan Robinson and Drake Maye to win the award. He won his first Super Bowl when the Seahawks defeated the New England Patriots 29–13 in Super Bowl LX. He had four receptions for 27 yards in the Super Bowl.

=== 2026 season ===
On March 20, 2026, the Seahawks exercised the fifth-year option on Smith-Njigba's contract. Three days later, Smith-Njigba and the Seahawks agreed on a four-year, $168 million contract extension, making him the NFL's highest paid receiver and locking him with the team until 2031. On September 9, 2026, Smith-Njigba had his first touchdown of the season during the Seahawks 13–10 win over the Patriots.

On September 20, 2026, versus the Arizona Cardinals, Smith-Njigba recorded a career high three touchdowns, including a career long 82-yard touchdown in Seattle's 31–7 victory. The following week on the road versus the Washington Commanders, Smith-Njigba recorded 10 catches for 128 yards and 2 touchdowns.

== Personal life ==
Smith-Njigba is a Christian. He wears Sierra Leone's flag on the back of his helmet to honor his paternal grandparents. Smith-Njigba's older brother is former MLB baseball player Canaan Smith-Njigba.

Smith-Njigba has recreated soccer player Michael Olise's trademark goal celebration after his first touchdown of the season in 2026.

== Career statistics ==
Legend
	AP NFL Offensive Player of the Year
	Won the Super Bowl
	Led the league
**Bold**	Career high

=== NFL ===
==== Regular season ====
Year	Team	Games		Receiving						Fumbles	
Year	Team	GP	GS	Tgt	Rec	Yds	Avg	Lng	TD	Fum	Lost
2023	SEA	17	3	93	63	628	10.0	35	4	0	0
2024	SEA	17	16	137	100	1,130	11.3	46	6	1	0
2025	SEA	17	17	**163**	**119**	**1,793**	15.1	63	**10**	**3**	**1**
2026	SEA	10	10	109	79	1,207	**15.3**	**82**	**10**	0	0
Career		61	46	502	361	4,758	13.2	82	30	4	1

==== Postseason ====
Year	Team	Games		Receiving						Fumbles	
Year	Team	GP	GS	Tgt	Rec	Yds	Avg	Lng	TD	Fum	Lost
2025	SEA	3	3	26	17	199	11.7	42	2	0	0
Career		3	3	26	17	199	11.7	42	2	0	0

=== College ===
Year	Team	Games		Receiving				Returning			
Year	Team	GP	GS	Rec	Yards	Avg	TD	Att	Yards	Avg	TD
2020	Ohio State	7	0	10	49	4.9	1	3	11	3.7	0
2021	Ohio State	13	13	**95**	**1,606**	**16.9**	**9**	**8**	**60**	**7.5**	0
2022	Ohio State	3	3	5	43	8.6	0	0	0	0.0	0
Career		23	16	110	1,698	15.4	10	11	71	6.5	0
