= AFC Championship Game =

Semifinal championship football game in the NFL

- First played: January 3, 1971 (1970 season)
- Trophy: Lamar Hunt Trophy

2025 season
- Empower Field at Mile High; Denver, Colorado; January 25, 2026; New England Patriots 10; Denver Broncos 7

The AFC Championship Game is the annual championship game of the American Football Conference (AFC) and one of the two semifinal playoff games of the National Football League (NFL), the largest professional American football league in the world. The game is played on the last Sunday in January by the two remaining playoff teams, following the AFC postseason's first two rounds. The AFC champion then advances to face the winner of the NFC Championship Game in the Super Bowl.

The game was established as part of the 1970 merger between the NFL and the American Football League (AFL), with the merged league realigning into two conferences. Since 1984, each winner of the AFC Championship Game has also received the Lamar Hunt Trophy, named after the founder of the AFL and founder and longtime owner of the Kansas City Chiefs, Lamar Hunt.

== History ==
The first AFC Championship Game was played following the 1970 regular season after the merger between the NFL and the AFL. The game is considered the successor to the former AFL Championship, and its game results are listed with that of its predecessor in the annual NFL Record and Fact Book. Since the pre-merger NFL consisted of six more teams than the AFL (16 teams for the NFL and 10 for the AFL), a realignment was required as part of the merger to create two conferences with an equal number of teams: The NFL's Baltimore Colts, Cleveland Browns, and Pittsburgh Steelers joined the ten former AFL teams to form the AFC; while the remaining 13 pre-merger NFL clubs formed the NFC.

Every current AFC team except the Houston Texans has played in an AFC Championship Game at least once, while the New York Jets and the Tennessee Titans have yet to host one. The Seattle Seahawks, who have been members in both the AFC and the NFC, hold the distinction of appearing in both conference title games, a loss in the AFC conference title game to the Los Angeles Raiders for Super Bowl XVIII and, in their first appearance in an NFC conference title game, a win over the Carolina Panthers for Super Bowl XL. The Pittsburgh Steelers have the most losses in the AFC Championship Game at 8 and have hosted the most at 11. The New England Patriots have won the most AFC Championships at 11, and played in a record eight straight AFC title games (2011–2018). The Patriots and Steelers are tied for most appearances, with 16 each. At least one of New England quarterback Tom Brady and Pittsburgh quarterback Ben Roethlisberger played in every championship game between the 2003 and the 2018 seasons, except for the 2009 season. The Kansas City Chiefs have hosted the AFC Championship a record five consecutive times, between the 2018–2022 seasons.

The Denver Broncos and the Pittsburgh Steelers are the only two AFC teams to appear in at least one AFC Championship game in every completed decade since 1970.

== Playoff structure ==
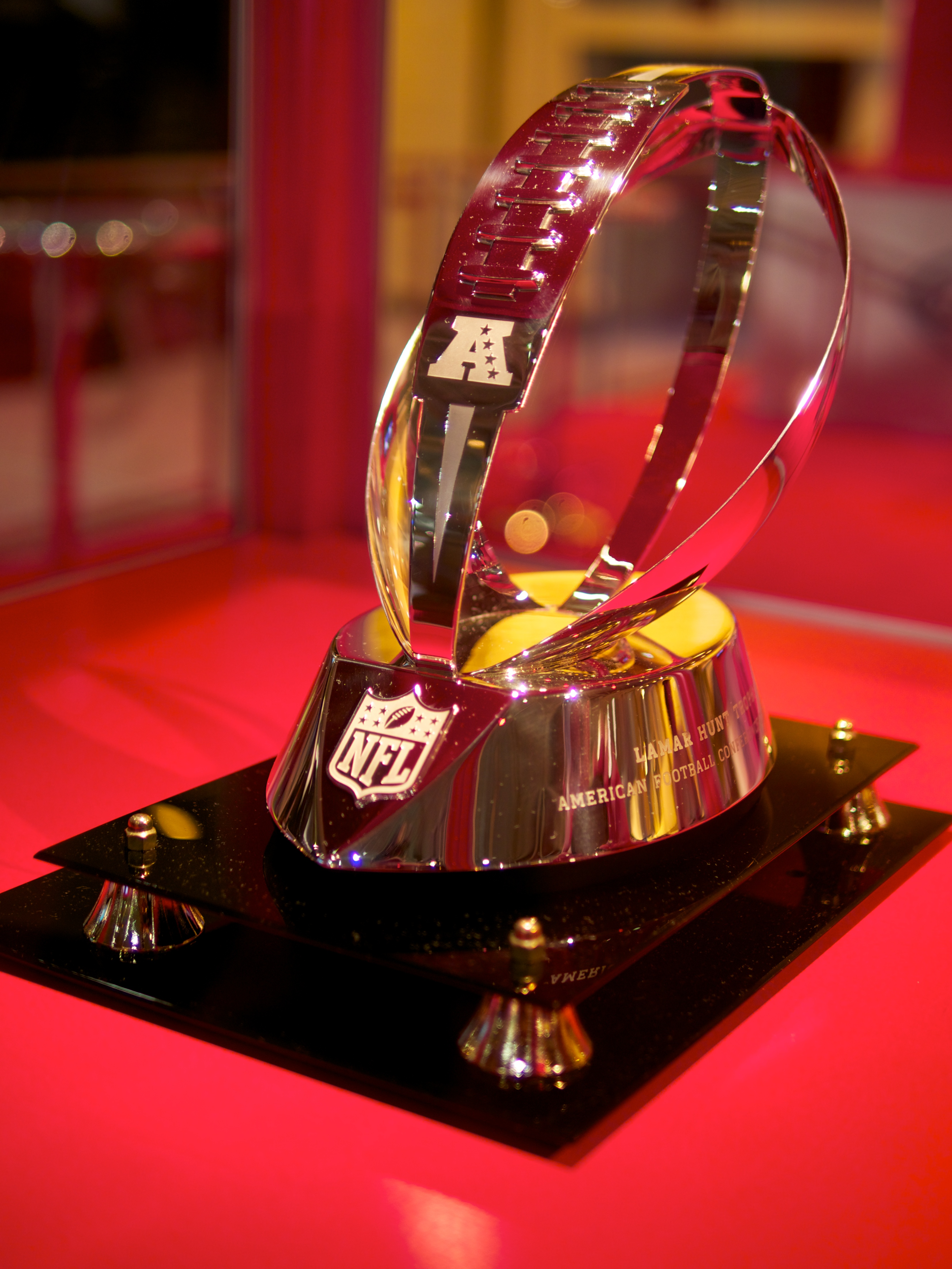
The redesigned Lamar Hunt Trophy, awarded since 2010–11 season

The structure of the NFL playoffs has changed several times since 1970. At the end of each regular season, the top teams in the AFC qualify for the postseason, including all division champions (three division winners from the 1970–71 to 2001–02 seasons; four since the 2002–03 season) and a set number of "wild card" teams that possess the best win–loss records after the regular season yet fail to win their division (one wild card team from the 1970–71 to 1977–78 seasons; two wild cards from 1978–79 to 1989–90, and from 2002–03 to 2019–20; three from 1990–91 to 2001–02, and since 2020–21). The two teams remaining following the Wild Card round (first round) and the Divisional round (second round) play in the AFC Championship Game, with the winner advancing to the Super Bowl.

Initially, the site of the AFC Championship Game was determined on a rotating basis. Since the 1975–76 season, the site of the game has been based on playoff seeding based on the regular season won-loss record, with the highest surviving seed hosting the game. A wild card team can only host the game if both participants are wild cards; such an instance has yet to occur in the NFL.

== Lamar Hunt Trophy ==
External image
- The (former version of the) Lamar Hunt Trophy on display at a press conference at the Westin Hotel in Denver, Colorado. Getty Images. January 20, 2006.

Beginning with the 1984–85 NFL playoffs, the winner of the AFC Championship Game has received the Lamar Hunt Trophy, named after the founder of the AFL and founder and longtime owner of the Kansas City Chiefs. The original design by Don Weller consisted of a wooden base with a sculpted AFC logo in the front and a relief sculpture of various football players in the back, with raised silver frieze utilized. The George Halas Trophy, awarded to the NFC Champion, used a similar design with a sculpted NFC logo.

For the 2010–11 NFL playoffs, the two conference trophies were redesigned by Tiffany & Co. at the request of the NFL in an attempt to make both awards more significant. The trophies are now a new, silver design with the outline of a hollow football positioned on a small base to more closely resemble the Vince Lombardi Trophy, which is awarded to the winner of the Super Bowl.

In recent years conference championship rings are also awarded to members of the team who wins the AFC or NFC championship since they are the winners of the conference, even though they may not necessarily follow it up with a win in the Super Bowl.

== List of AFC Championship Games ==
Numbers in parentheses in the winning team and losing team columns are AFC Championships won and lost by that team. Bold indicates team won Super Bowl that year. Numbers in parentheses in the city and stadium column is the number of times that metropolitan area and stadium has hosted an AFC Championship, respectively.

Season	Playoffs	Date	Winning team	Score	Losing team	Score	Location	Stadium
1970	1970–71	January 3, 1971	**Baltimore Colts** (1)	27	Oakland Raiders (1)	17	Baltimore, Maryland (Note: Baltimore has hosted 2 total AFC Championship Games: 1 Colts home game and 1 Ravens home game.)	Memorial Stadium
1971	1971–72	January 2, 1972	Miami Dolphins (1)	21	Baltimore Colts (1)	0	Miami, Florida (Note: The Miami Orange Bowl was in Miami proper. Joe Robbie Stadium, now Hard Rock Stadium, opened in 1987 in an unincorporated area with a Miami address; the area was then incorporated as Miami Gardens in 2003.)	Miami Orange Bowl
1972	1972–73	December 31, 1972	**Miami Dolphins** (2)	21	Pittsburgh Steelers (1)	17	Pittsburgh, Pennsylvania	Three Rivers Stadium
1973	1973–74	December 30, 1973	**Miami Dolphins** (3)	27	Oakland Raiders (2)	10	Miami, Florida (2)	Miami Orange Bowl (2)
1974	1974–75	December 29, 1974	**Pittsburgh Steelers** (1)	24	Oakland Raiders (3)	13	Oakland, California	Oakland Coliseum (Note: The Oakland Coliseum was also known as Network Associates Coliseum.)
1975	1975–76	January 4, 1976	**Pittsburgh Steelers** (2)	16	Oakland Raiders (4)	10	Pittsburgh, Pennsylvania (2)	Three Rivers Stadium (2)
1976	1976–77	December 26, 1976	**Oakland Raiders** (1)	24	Pittsburgh Steelers (2)	7	Oakland, California (2)	Oakland Coliseum (2)
1977	1977–78	January 1, 1978	Denver Broncos (1)	20	Oakland Raiders (5)	17	Denver, Colorado	Mile High Stadium
1978	1978–79	January 7, 1979	**Pittsburgh Steelers** (3)	34	Houston Oilers (1)	5	Pittsburgh, Pennsylvania (3)	Three Rivers Stadium (3)
1979	1979–80	January 6, 1980	**Pittsburgh Steelers** (4)	27	Houston Oilers (2)	13	Pittsburgh, Pennsylvania (4)	Three Rivers Stadium (4)
1980	1980–81	January 11, 1981	**Oakland Raiders** (2)	34	San Diego Chargers (1)	27	San Diego, California	Jack Murphy Stadium
1981	1981–82	January 10, 1982	Cincinnati Bengals (1)	27	San Diego Chargers (2)	7	Cincinnati, Ohio	Riverfront Stadium
1982	1982–83	January 23, 1983	Miami Dolphins (4)	14	New York Jets (1)	0	Miami, Florida (3)	Miami Orange Bowl (3)
1983	1983–84	January 8, 1984	**Los Angeles Raiders** (3)	30	Seattle Seahawks (1)	14	Los Angeles, California	Los Angeles Memorial Coliseum
1984	1984–85	January 6, 1985	Miami Dolphins (5)	45	Pittsburgh Steelers (3)	28	Miami, Florida (4)	Miami Orange Bowl (4)
1985	1985–86	January 12, 1986	New England Patriots (1)	31	Miami Dolphins (1)	14	Miami, Florida (5)	Miami Orange Bowl (5)
1986	1986–87	January 11, 1987	Denver Broncos (2)	23 (Note: Overtime)	Cleveland Browns (1)	20	Cleveland, Ohio	Cleveland Municipal Stadium
1987	1987–88	January 17, 1988	Denver Broncos (3)	38	Cleveland Browns (2)	33	Denver, Colorado (2)	Mile High Stadium (2)
1988	1988–89	January 8, 1989	Cincinnati Bengals (2)	21	Buffalo Bills (1)	10	Cincinnati, Ohio (2)	Riverfront Stadium (2)
1989	1989–90	January 14, 1990	Denver Broncos (4)	37	Cleveland Browns (3)	21	Denver, Colorado (3)	Mile High Stadium (3)
1990	1990–91	January 20, 1991	Buffalo Bills (1)	51	Los Angeles Raiders (6)	3	Orchard Park, New York	Rich Stadium
1991	1991–92	January 12, 1992	Buffalo Bills (2)	10	Denver Broncos (1)	7	Orchard Park, New York (2)	Rich Stadium (2)
1992	1992–93	January 17, 1993	Buffalo Bills (3)	29	Miami Dolphins (2)	10	Miami, Florida (6)	Joe Robbie Stadium
1993	1993–94	January 23, 1994	Buffalo Bills (4)	30	Kansas City Chiefs (1)	13	Orchard Park, New York (3)	Rich Stadium (3)
1994	1994–95	January 15, 1995	San Diego Chargers (1)	17	Pittsburgh Steelers (4)	13	Pittsburgh, Pennsylvania (5)	Three Rivers Stadium (5)
1995	1995–96	January 14, 1996	Pittsburgh Steelers (5)	20	Indianapolis Colts (2)	16	Pittsburgh, Pennsylvania (6)	Three Rivers Stadium (6)
1996	1996–97	January 12, 1997	New England Patriots (2)	20	Jacksonville Jaguars (1)	6	Foxborough, Massachusetts	Foxboro Stadium
1997	1997–98	January 11, 1998	**Denver Broncos** (5)	24	Pittsburgh Steelers (5)	21	Pittsburgh, Pennsylvania (7)	Three Rivers Stadium (7)
1998	1998–99	January 17, 1999	**Denver Broncos** (6)	23	New York Jets (2)	10	Denver, Colorado (4)	Mile High Stadium (4)
1999	1999–00	January 23, 2000	Tennessee Titans (1)	33	Jacksonville Jaguars (2)	14	Jacksonville, Florida	Alltel Stadium
2000	2000–01	January 14, 2001	**Baltimore Ravens** (1)	16	Oakland Raiders (7)	3	Oakland, California (3)	Oakland Coliseum (3)
2001	2001–02	January 27, 2002	**New England Patriots** (3)	24	Pittsburgh Steelers (6)	17	Pittsburgh, Pennsylvania (8)	Heinz Field (Note: Acrisure Stadium was previously known as Heinz Field)
2002	2002–03	January 19, 2003	Oakland Raiders (4)	41	Tennessee Titans (3)	24	Oakland, California (4)	Network Associates Coliseum (4)
2003	2003–04	January 18, 2004	**New England Patriots** (4)	24	Indianapolis Colts (3)	14	Foxborough, Massachusetts (2)	Gillette Stadium
2004	2004–05	January 23, 2005	**New England Patriots** (5)	41	Pittsburgh Steelers (7)	27	Pittsburgh, Pennsylvania (9)	Heinz Field (2)
2005	2005–06	January 22, 2006	**Pittsburgh Steelers** (6)	34	Denver Broncos (2)	17	Denver, Colorado (5)	Invesco Field at Mile High (Note: Empower Field at Mile High was also known as Invesco Field at Mile High, then Sports Authority Field at Mile High.)
2006	2006–07	January 21, 2007	**Indianapolis Colts** (2)	38	New England Patriots (1)	34	Indianapolis, Indiana	RCA Dome
2007	2007–08	January 20, 2008	New England Patriots (6)	21	San Diego Chargers (3)	12	Foxborough, Massachusetts (3)	Gillette Stadium (2)
2008	2008–09	January 18, 2009	**Pittsburgh Steelers** (7)	23	Baltimore Ravens (1)	14	Pittsburgh, Pennsylvania (10)	Heinz Field (3)
2009	2009–10	January 24, 2010	Indianapolis Colts (3)	30	New York Jets (3)	17	Indianapolis, Indiana (2)	Lucas Oil Stadium
2010	2010–11	January 23, 2011	Pittsburgh Steelers (8)	24	New York Jets (4)	19	Pittsburgh, Pennsylvania (11)	Heinz Field (4)
2011	2011–12	January 22, 2012	New England Patriots (7)	23	Baltimore Ravens (2)	20	Foxborough, Massachusetts (4)	Gillette Stadium (3)
2012	2012–13	January 20, 2013	**Baltimore Ravens** (2)	28	New England Patriots (2)	13	Foxborough, Massachusetts (5)	Gillette Stadium (4)
2013	2013–14	January 19, 2014	Denver Broncos (7)	26	New England Patriots (3)	16	Denver, Colorado (6)	Sports Authority Field at Mile High (2)
2014	2014–15	January 18, 2015	**New England Patriots** (8)	45	Indianapolis Colts (4)	7	Foxborough, Massachusetts (6)	Gillette Stadium (5)
2015	2015–16	January 24, 2016	**Denver Broncos** (8)	20	New England Patriots (4)	18	Denver, Colorado (7)	Sports Authority Field at Mile High (3)
2016	2016–17	January 22, 2017	**New England Patriots** (9)	36	Pittsburgh Steelers (8)	17	Foxborough, Massachusetts (7)	Gillette Stadium (6)
2017	2017–18	January 21, 2018	New England Patriots (10)	24	Jacksonville Jaguars (3)	20	Foxborough, Massachusetts (8)	Gillette Stadium (7)
2018	2018–19	January 20, 2019	**New England Patriots** (11)	37	Kansas City Chiefs (2)	31	Kansas City, Missouri	Arrowhead Stadium
2019	2019–20	January 19, 2020	**Kansas City Chiefs** (1)	35	Tennessee Titans (4)	24	Kansas City, Missouri (2)	Arrowhead Stadium (2)
2020	2020–21	January 24, 2021	Kansas City Chiefs (2)	38	Buffalo Bills (2)	24	Kansas City, Missouri (3)	Arrowhead Stadium (3)
2021	2021–22	January 30, 2022	Cincinnati Bengals (3)	27	Kansas City Chiefs (3)	24	Kansas City, Missouri (4)	Arrowhead Stadium (4)
2022	2022–23	January 29, 2023	**Kansas City Chiefs** (3)	23	Cincinnati Bengals (1)	20	Kansas City, Missouri (5)	Arrowhead Stadium (5)
2023	2023–24	January 28, 2024	**Kansas City Chiefs** (4)	17	Baltimore Ravens (3)	10	Baltimore, Maryland (2)	M&T Bank Stadium
2024	2024–25	January 26, 2025	Kansas City Chiefs (5)	32	Buffalo Bills (3)	29	Kansas City, Missouri (6)	Arrowhead Stadium (6)
2025	2025–26	January 25, 2026	New England Patriots (12)	10	Denver Broncos (3)	7	Denver, Colorado (8)	Empower Field at Mile High (4)

== Appearances, 1970–present ==
In the sortable table below, teams are ordered first by number of appearances, then by number of wins, and finally by year of first appearance. Former AFC teams are listed in italics.

The Houston Texans, the last current AFC team to have never made an appearance, are omitted. (Note: The Houston Texans were founded in 2002.)

#	Team	W	L	%	PF	PA	Last game	Last win	Home				Away			
#	Team	W	L	%	PF	PA	Last game	Last win	G	W	L	%	G	W	L	%
16	New England Patriots	12	4	.750	417	304	2025	2025	8	7	1	.875	8	5	3	.625
16	Pittsburgh Steelers	8	8	.500	349	339	2016	2010	11	6	5	.545	5	2	3	.400
11	Denver Broncos	8	3	.727	242	210	2025	2015	8	6	2	.750	3	2	1	.667
11	Las Vegas Raiders (Note: Includes appearances during the Raiders' first tenure in Oakland (the 1970 merger until 1981), where they went 2–5 in AFC Championship Games; their period as the Los Angeles Raiders (1982–1994), where they went 1–1 in AFC Championship Games; and their second tenure in Oakland (1995–2019), where they went 1–1 in AFC Championship Games. Since moving to Las Vegas in 2020, the Raiders are 0–0 in AFC Championship Games.)	4	7	.364	202	253	2002	2002	5	3	2	.600	6	1	5	.167
8	Kansas City Chiefs	5	3	.625	213	201	2024	2024	6	4	2	.667	2	1	1	.500
7	Miami Dolphins	5	2	.714	152	115	1992	1984	6	4	2	.667	1	1	0	1.000
7	Buffalo Bills	4	3	.571	183	124	2024	1993	3	3	0	1.000	4	1	3	.250
7	Indianapolis Colts (Note: Includes appearances as the Baltimore Colts (the 1970 merger to 1983), where they went 1–1 in AFC Championship Games. Since moving to Indianapolis in 1984, the Colts are 2–3 in AFC Championship Games.)	3	4	.429	132	178	2014	2009	3	3	0	1.000	4	0	4	.000
5	Baltimore Ravens	2	3	.400	88	79	2023	2012	1	0	1	.000	4	2	2	.500
5	Tennessee Titans (Note: Includes appearances as the Houston Oilers (the 1970 merger to 1996), where they went 0–2 in AFC Championship Games. Since moving to Tennessee in 1997, they are 1–2 in AFC Championship Games.)	1	4	.200	99	151	2019	1999	0	0	0	—N/a	5	1	4	.200
4	Cincinnati Bengals	3	1	.750	95	64	2022	2021	2	2	0	1.000	2	1	1	.500
4	Los Angeles Chargers (Note: The Chargers were playing in San Diego at the time of all their AFC Championship appearances.)	1	3	.250	63	95	2007	1994	1	0	1	.000	3	1	2	.333
4	New York Jets	0	4	.000	46	91	2010	—N/a	0	0	0	—N/a	4	0	4	.000
3	Cleveland Browns	0	3	.000	74	98	1989	—N/a	1	0	1	.000	2	0	2	.000
3	Jacksonville Jaguars	0	3	.000	40	77	2017	—N/a	1	0	1	.000	2	0	2	.000
1	Seattle Seahawks (Note: The Seahawks were members of the NFC in 1976 and then members of the AFC from 1977 to 2001, before rejoining the NFC in 2002. Including their appearances in the NFC Championship Game (4–0), they hold a combined 4–1 record between both Conference Championship Games.)	0	1	.000	14	30	1983	—N/a	0	0	0	—N/a	1	0	1	.000

== Appearances by year ==
In the sortable table below, teams are ordered first by number of appearances, then by number of wins, and finally by year of first appearance. In the "Season(s)" column, bold years indicate winning Conference Championship appearances. Former AFC teams are listed in italics.

Apps	Team	Wins	Losses	Win %	Season(s)
16	New England Patriots	12	4	.750	1985, 1996, 2001, 2003, 2004, 2006, 2007, 2011, 2012, 2013, 2014, 2015, 2016, 2017, 2018, 2025
16	Pittsburgh Steelers	8	8	.500	1972, 1974, 1975, 1976, 1978, 1979, 1984, 1994, 1995, 1997, 2001, 2004, 2005, 2008, 2010, 2016
11	Denver Broncos	8	3	.727	1977, 1986, 1987, 1989, 1991, 1997, 1998, 2005, 2013, 2015, 2025
11	Oakland/Los Angeles/Las Vegas Raiders	4	7	.364	1970, 1973, 1974, 1975, 1976, 1977, 1980, 1983, 1990, 2000, 2002
8	Kansas City Chiefs	5	3	.625	1993, 2018, 2019, 2020, 2021, 2022, 2023, 2024
7	Miami Dolphins	5	2	.714	1971, 1972, 1973, 1982, 1984, 1985, 1992
7	Buffalo Bills	4	3	.571	1988, 1990, 1991, 1992, 1993, 2020, 2024
7	Baltimore/Indianapolis Colts	3	4	.429	1970, 1971, 1995, 2003, 2006, 2009, 2014
5	Baltimore Ravens	2	3	.400	2000, 2008, 2011, 2012, 2023
5	Houston Oilers/Tennessee Titans	1	4	.200	1978, 1979, 1999, 2002, 2019
4	Cincinnati Bengals	3	1	.750	1981, 1988, 2021, 2022
4	San Diego/Los Angeles Chargers	1	3	.250	1980, 1981, 1994, 2007
4	New York Jets	0	4	.000	1982, 1998, 2009, 2010
3	Jacksonville Jaguars	0	3	.000	1996, 1999, 2017
3	Cleveland Browns	0	3	.000	1986, 1987, 1989
1	Seattle Seahawks	0	1	.000	1983
0	Houston Texans	0	0	–	
0	Tampa Bay Buccaneers (Note: The Buccaneers were members of the AFC in 1976 before moving to the NFC in 1977.)	0	0	–	

== Records by division ==
The table below shows AFC Championship Game records by division, based on the division the franchise was in during the season the championship game was played. The NFL realigned divisions prior to the 2002 season, renaming the AFC Central as the AFC North, creating the AFC South, and shifting several teams among the divisions.

Division	Total				1970–2001				2002–present			
Division	Apps	Wins	Losses	Win %	Apps	Wins	Losses	Win %	Apps	Wins	Losses	Win %
AFC East	37	22	15	.595	20	13 (Note: AFC East conference championship game victories. Pre-2002: 1970, 1971, 1972, 1973, 1982, 1984, 1985, 1990, 1991, 1992, 1993, 1996, 2001. Since 2002: 2003, 2004, 2007, 2011, 2014, 2016, 2017, 2018, 2025.)	7 (Note: AFC East conference championship game losses. Pre-2002: 1971, 1982, 1985, 1988, 1992, 1995, 1998. Since 2002: 2006, 2009, 2010, 2012, 2013, 2015, 2020, 2024.)	.650	17	9	8	.529
AFC North	33	14	19	.424	22	9 (Note: AFC North conference championship game victories. Pre-2002: 1974, 1975, 1978, 1979, 1981, 1988, 1995, 1999, 2000. Since 2002: 2005, 2008, 2010, 2012, 2021.)	13 (Note: AFC North conference championship game losses. Pre-2002: 1972, 1976, 1978, 1979, 1984, 1986, 1987, 1989, 1994, 1996, 1997, 1999, 2001. Since 2002: 2004, 2008, 2011, 2016, 2022, 2023.)	.409	11	5	6	.455
AFC South	7	2	5	.286	—N/a				7	2 (Note: AFC South conference championship game victories: 2006, 2009.)	5 (Note: AFC South conference championship game losses: 2002, 2003, 2014, 2017, 2019.)	.286
AFC West	36	18	18	.500	22	10 (Note: AFC West conference championship game victories. Pre-2002: 1976, 1977, 1980, 1983, 1986, 1987, 1989, 1994, 1997, 1998. Since 2002: 2002, 2013, 2015, 2019, 2020, 2022, 2023, 2024.)	12 (Note: AFC West conference championship game losses. Pre-2002: 1970, 1973, 1974, 1975, 1977, 1980, 1981, 1983, 1990, 1991, 1993, 2000. Since 2002: 2005, 2007, 2018, 2021, 2025)	.455	13	8	5	.615

== Most common matchups ==
Count	Matchup	Record	Years Played
3	Oakland / Los Angeles / Las Vegas Raiders vs. Pittsburgh Steelers	Steelers, 2–1	1974, 1975, 1976
3	Denver Broncos vs. Cleveland Browns	Broncos, 3–0	1986, 1987, 1989
3	Baltimore / Indianapolis Colts vs. New England Patriots	Patriots, 2–1	2003, 2006, 2014
3	New England Patriots vs. Pittsburgh Steelers	Patriots, 3–0	2001, 2004, 2016
3	Buffalo Bills vs. Kansas City Chiefs	Chiefs, 2–1	1993, 2020, 2024
3	Denver Broncos vs. New England Patriots	Broncos, 2–1	2013, 2015, 2025
2	Houston / Tennessee Oilers / Titans vs. Pittsburgh Steelers	Steelers, 2–0	1978, 1979
2	Miami Dolphins vs. Pittsburgh Steelers	Dolphins, 2–0	1972, 1984
2	Denver Broncos vs. Pittsburgh Steelers	Tie, 1–1	1997, 2005
2	Baltimore Ravens vs. New England Patriots	Tie, 1–1	2011, 2012
2	Jacksonville Jaguars vs. New England Patriots	Patriots, 2–0	1996, 2017
2	Cincinnati Bengals vs. Kansas City Chiefs	Tie, 1–1	2021, 2022

== AFC Championship Game records ==
AFC Championship Game logo, 2001–2005

AFC Championship Game logo, 2008–2010 (Used with old shield since 2005)

- Most victories: 12** – New England Patriots (1985, 1996, 2001, 2003, 2004, 2007, 2011, 2014, 2016, 2017, 2018, 2025)
- Most losses: 8 – Pittsburgh Steelers, (1972, 1976, 1984, 1994, 1997, 2001, 2004, 2016)
- Most appearances: 16 (tie)
  - Pittsburgh Steelers (1972, 1974–1976, 1978, 1979, 1984, 1994, 1995, 1997, 2001, 2004, 2005, 2008, 2010, 2016)
  - New England Patriots (1985, 1996, 2001, 2003, 2004, 2006, 2007, 2011–2018, 2025)
- Most consecutive appearances: 8** – New England Patriots (2011–2018)
- Most consecutive victories: 4** – Buffalo Bills (1990–1993)
- Most appearances without a win: 4** – New York Jets (1982, 1998, 2009, 2010)
- Most consecutive losses before first win: 4* – Oakland Raiders (1970, 1973, 1974, 1975)
- Most consecutive appearances without a win: 4 (tie)
  - Oakland Raiders (1970, 1973, 1974, 1975)
  - New York Jets (1982, 1998, 2009, 2010)
- Most defensive shutouts: 2* – Miami Dolphins (1971, 21–0 vs Colts and 1982, 14–0 vs Jets)
- Most consecutive losses: 3* – Oakland Raiders (1973–1975)
- Most games hosted: 11* – Pittsburgh Steelers (1972, 1975, 1978, 1979, 1994, 1995, 1997, 2001, 2004, 2008, 2010)
- Most consecutive games hosted: 5** – Kansas City Chiefs (2018–2022)
- Most common matchup: 3 (tie, 6 times)
  - Pittsburgh Steelers vs. Oakland Raiders (1974, 1975, 1976)
  - Cleveland Browns vs. Denver Broncos (1986, 1987, 1989)
  - New England Patriots vs. Pittsburgh Steelers (2001, 2004, 2016)
  - New England Patriots vs. Indianapolis Colts (2003, 2006, 2014)
  - Buffalo Bills vs. Kansas City Chiefs (1993, 2020, 2024)
  - Denver Broncos vs. New England Patriots (2013, 2015, 2025)
- Most points scored: 51 – January 20, 1991 (1990) – Buffalo Bills (51) vs. Los Angeles Raiders (3)
- Largest margin of victory: 48 points** – January 20, 1991 (1990) – Buffalo Bills (51) vs. Los Angeles Raiders (3)
- Smallest margin of victory: 2 points – January 24, 2016 (2015) – Denver Broncos (20) vs. New England Patriots (18)
- Fewest points scored, winning team: 10 (tie)
  - January 12, 1992 (1991) – Buffalo Bills (10) vs. Denver Broncos (7)
  - January 25, 2026 (2025) – New England Patriots (10) vs. Denver Broncos (7)
- Fewest points scored: 0* (tie)
  - January 2, 1972 (1971) – Baltimore Colts (0) vs. Miami Dolphins (21)
  - January 23, 1983 (1982) – New York Jets (0) vs. Miami Dolphins (14)
- Most points scored, losing team: 34** – January 21, 2007 (2006) – New England Patriots (34) vs. Indianapolis Colts (38)
- Most combined points scored: 73 – January 6, 1985 (1984) – Miami Dolphins (45) vs. Pittsburgh Steelers (28)
- Fewest combined points scored: 14 – January 23, 1983 (1982) – Miami Dolphins (14) vs. New York Jets (0)
- Longest game: 65 minutes, 48 seconds – January 11, 1987 (1986) – Denver Broncos (23) vs. Cleveland Browns (20), OT
- Most AFC Championships lost in overtime: 2* – Kansas City Chiefs (2018, 2021)
- Current teams which have never appeared in an AFC Championship Game: Houston Texans
- Current teams which have never hosted an AFC Championship Game:
  - Houston Texans
  - New York Jets (Note: The Jets last hosted and won the 1968 AFL Championship Game during the Super Bowl era.)
  - Tennessee Titans (Note: The Houston Oilers/Tennessee Titans franchise last hosted the 1962 AFL Championship Game.)
- Current teams which have never won an AFC Championship Game:
  - Cleveland Browns (0–3)
  - Houston Texans (0–0)
  - Jacksonville Jaguars (0–3)
  - New York Jets (0–4)
- Longest drought without appearing in an AFC Championship Game: Cleveland Browns (last appearance – 1989)
- Longest drought without an AFC Championship: New York Jets
- Highest attendance: 91,445** – Seattle Seahawks vs. Los Angeles Raiders at the Los Angeles Memorial Coliseum on January 8, 1984 (1983)
- Largest comeback: 18 points** (tie)
  - Indianapolis Colts (trailed 21–3; won 38–34), 2006
  - Cincinnati Bengals (trailed 21–3; won 27–24), 2021
- Overtime games:
  - 1986: Denver Broncos 23, Cleveland Browns 20
  - 2018: New England Patriots 37, Kansas City Chiefs 31
  - 2021: Cincinnati Bengals 27, Kansas City Chiefs 24

Notes:

- *Tied for Conference Championship record
- **Conference Championship record

== TV ratings ==
- 1982: 51.6 million viewers
- 2003: 41.5 million viewers
- 2005: 44.3 million viewers
- 2006: 39 million viewers
- 2007: 46.7 million viewers
- 2009: 42 million viewers
- 2010: 42.3 million viewers
- 2011: 54.9 million viewers
- 2012: 48.7 million viewers
- 2013: 47.7 million viewers
- 2014: 51.3 million viewers
- 2015: 42.1 million viewers
- 2016: 53.3 million viewers
- 2017: 41.2 million viewers
- 2018: 53.9 million viewers
- 2019: 41.1 million viewers
- 2020: 41.8 million viewers
- 2021: 47.8 million viewers
- 2022: 53.1 million viewers
- 2023: 55.5 million viewers
- 2024: 57.4 million viewers
- 2025: 48.6 million viewers
