= NFL Kickoff Game =

Opening game of the NFL regular season

- NFL Kickoff Game logo used in 2016 (also used for all week 1 games) (Note: The logo year is updated annually. The then-new NFL "shield" logo was used for the first time in 2008. In 2015, an alternate black and gold version of the logo was used in preparation for that season’s Super Bowl 50.)
- First played: 2002

2025 season
- September 4, 2025; Dallas Cowboys 20; Philadelphia Eagles 24

2026 season
- September 9, 2026; New England Patriots 10; Seattle Seahawks 13

NFL Kickoff Game is the name given to the first game of the National Football League (NFL) regular season. A single game is held, preceded by a concert and other ceremonies. This first game of the season is usually scheduled for the Thursday following Labor Day in early September (with the date range being September 4–10). On two occasions, the game was scheduled for Wednesday: 2012, to avoid conflicts with the acceptance speech of the Democratic National Convention and the other in 2026 when the league scheduled an International Series game on Thursday.

The Kickoff Game was introduced for the 2002 season. From 2004 onward, the current Super Bowl champion has hosted the Kickoff Game with two exceptions—in 2013, the defending champion Baltimore Ravens opened on the road because of a conflict with a previously scheduled Orioles baseball game the same day, and in 2019, the defending champion New England Patriots did not play at all in the Kickoff Game as the league instead scheduled the Green Bay Packers and the Chicago Bears for that game to celebrate its 100th season of operation. (Note: The Bears–Packers rivalry, featuring two of the league's oldest franchises, is the most-played of all NFL rivalries; the Patriots instead played on NBC Sunday Night Football.) Since its inception, the home team has an overall record of 19–6, and defending Super Bowl champions hold a 18–4 record.

Broadcast rights to the Kickoff Game is typically included in the NFL's top primetime television package; as such, it is currently broadcast by NBC as part of the Sunday Night Football package.

== History ==
The logo for the 2002 concert event before the Kickoff game.

The Kickoff Game was introduced in the 2002 season, under the leadership of then–NFL marketing executive John Collins and then–NFL Senior Vice President of Special Events Jim Steeg. It was conceived as an effort to boost economic recovery in the New York and Washington areas in the wake of 9/11. It was considered a success, increasing NFL sponsorships by $1.9 billion over the next 14 months.

ESPN televised the first game. In order to do so, ESPN eliminated its traditional late-October Thursday night game (held the weekend of Games 1 and 2 of the World Series), and replaced it with the opening night kickoff game. Because of the success of the first game, the rights to televise both the Kickoff Game and the pregame concert were transferred immediately after the season to ABC as part of their Monday Night Football package. In 2006, NBC acquired the television rights to the Kickoff Game as part of their Sunday Night Football package.

The concept of the NFL champion playing in an opening game was not altogether new, however. From 1934 to 1976, the first game of the pre-season was the Chicago All-Star Game, an exhibition match featuring the previous season's NFL champions against an all-rookie team of college all-stars held annually in Soldier Field in Chicago.

After the merger of the NFL with the All-America Football Conference (AAFC) in 1949, the opening game of the 1950 NFL season was a Saturday night showcase game between the NFL champion Philadelphia Eagles and the AAFC champion Cleveland Browns. Billed as the "World Series of Pro Football" the game matched the four-time champion Browns against the two-time champion Eagles and with an attendance of 71,000 was one of the largest pro football crowds to that date.

With the advent of Monday Night Football in 1970 it became common for the Super Bowl champion to appear in a "showcase" game the first weekend of the season. This was the case in 1978–1979, 1983, 1987–1988, 1990–1993, 1996–2000, and 2002–2003.

Defending Super Bowl champions are 13–5 in the Kickoff Game. The New York Giants, Baltimore Ravens, New England Patriots, Los Angeles Rams, and Kansas City Chiefs are the only five defending Super Bowl champions to have lost. The Giants are also the only home team to have lost in the Kickoff Game twice—once in the very first edition of the contest, when the defending Super Bowl winner was not yet a regular participant, and again in 2012.

=== ABC Monday Night Football ===
2003: The kickoff game's popularity and success saw it move to ABC as part of the Monday Night Football package. In order for the kickoff game to fit into the schedule, ABC dropped the Monday Night Football game held in the last week of the NFL season. That game had become increasingly unpopular because it often lacked playoff significance, and because of the undesirable possibility that a team playing on Monday night in the final week of the regular season might have to play a playoff game the following Saturday. In return, ESPN (which, like ABC, is owned by Disney) received a week 17 Saturday night game. While the defending Super Bowl champions Tampa Bay Buccaneers were not selected for the Thursday night game, they did play a nationally televised game against the Philadelphia Eagles four nights later on MNF. Instead, the Washington Redskins defeated the New York Jets 16–13.

2004: The tradition began that the kickoff game would be hosted by the reigning Super Bowl champions. The New England Patriots kicked off the tradition by hosting the Indianapolis Colts, and defeated them, 27–24. After the "wardrobe malfunction" incident at Super Bowl XXXVIII, the NFL initially canceled future plans for concerts in conjunction with the NFL Kickoff game. Later in the year, however, the decision was reversed, and instead a 10-second broadcast delay was put in place.

2005: The tradition continued in 2005, by having the Super Bowl champion New England Patriots host the Oakland Raiders, who they defeated, 30–20. This was the final season the kickoff game would air on ABC, as the broadcast rights shifted to NBC the following year.

=== NBC Sunday Night Football ===
2006: With the change in television contracts, the Kickoff Game was moved to NBC, who held the rights to NBC Sunday Night Football. The game opposite the first weekend of World Series games was once again removed to compensate.

2008: The league and NBC agreed to move up the opening kickoff of the kickoff game, to 7 p.m., in order for coverage of the Republican National Convention not to compete with the game. That game featured the Washington Redskins and the New York Giants. The game was also the first to be carried by Internet television in the United States, as were all Sunday Night Football games in the 2008 season.

2010: The New Orleans Saints, winners of Super Bowl XLIV, hosted the kickoff game at the Louisiana Superdome against the Minnesota Vikings, a rematch of the previous season's NFC Championship Game. There was consideration of a match-up against the Pittsburgh Steelers (to create a contest between the last two Super Bowl champions) but it did not come to fruition due to various logistical reasons.

2011: The Green Bay Packers hosted the 2011 Kickoff Game after winning Super Bowl XLV. They defeated the New Orleans Saints, a match-up of the winners of the two previous Super Bowls, the first time this has occurred. The Saints are only the second team to have played in two consecutive kickoff games, and the first to do so not by winning two consecutive Super Bowls. In the third quarter, the Packers' Randall Cobb returned a kickoff 108 yards for a touchdown, tying the NFL record for the longest such return.

2012: Similar to the situation in 2008, the NFL was faced with the prospect of having to compete with a national political convention, this time the Democratic National Convention. Instead of moving the kickoff to 7 p.m. like in 2008, or even opening up the season on a Thursday like in past years, the league instead decided to move the 2012 Kickoff Game one day earlier to Wednesday, September 5. The New York Giants, winners of Super Bowl XLVI, hosted their rivals, the Dallas Cowboys.

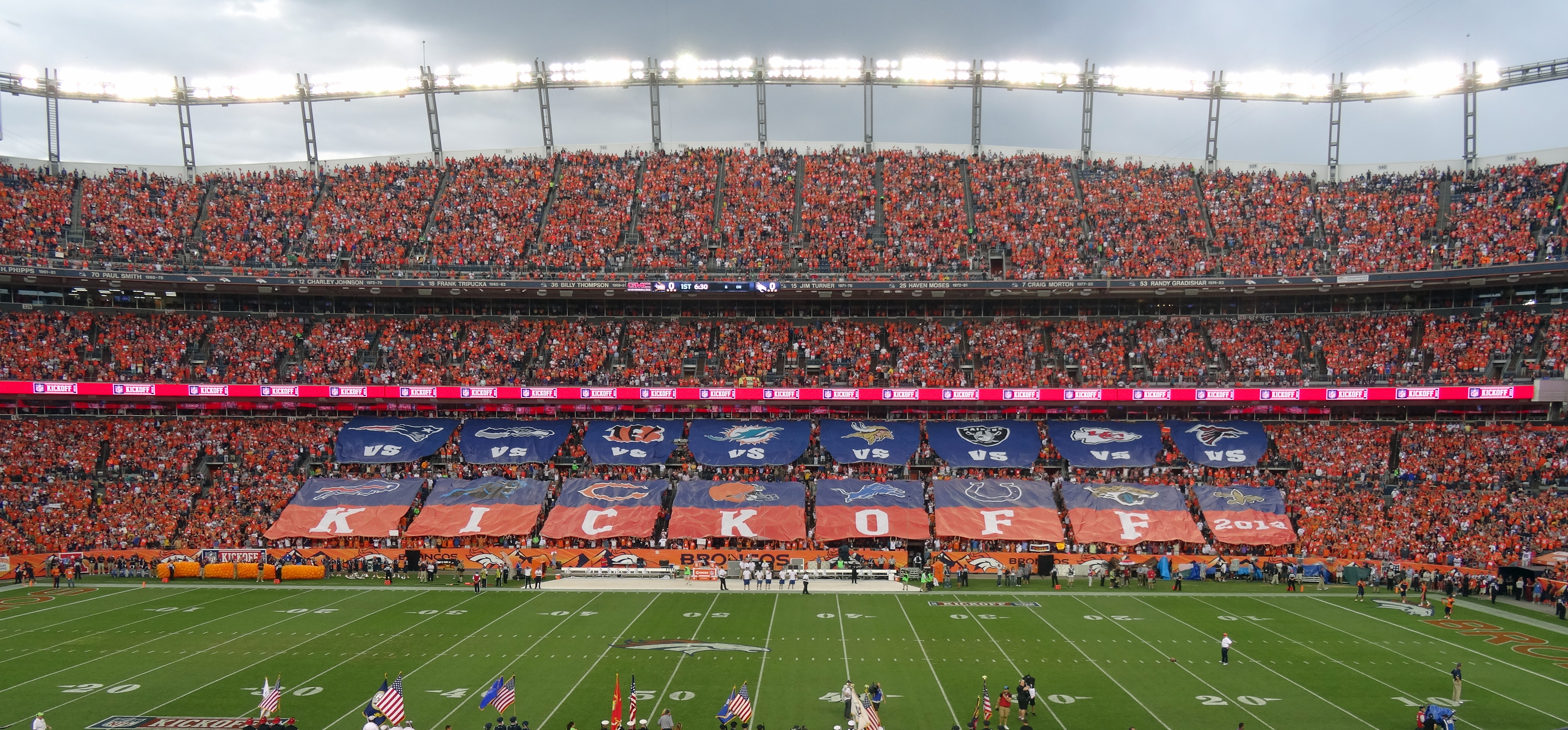
The 2013 game in Denver

2013: After winning Super Bowl XLVII, the Baltimore Ravens were to have hosted the 2013 Kickoff Game on September 5. However, this was on the same day as a home game for the Baltimore Orioles, whose stadium, Oriole Park at Camden Yards, shares parking with the Ravens' M&T Bank Stadium. (The Orioles did not move their game to the afternoon, because they and their opponent were playing night games in other cities the preceding day.) The Ravens instead played on the road against the Denver Broncos in a rematch of the previous season's AFC Divisional Playoff game. During this game, Peyton Manning became one of only six players to have thrown seven touchdowns in a single game. He added to this feat by doing it without throwing an interception, something that has only been done once before by Y. A. Tittle during the 1962 NFL season. The Ravens also had the most points scored against them in franchise history. They also suffered the biggest margin of defeat by a defending Super Bowl champion on opening day in NFL history.

2015: The New England Patriots, after winning Super Bowl XLIX, hosted the 2015 Kickoff Game on September 10 at Gillette Stadium, with the Pittsburgh Steelers as their opponent. Patriots quarterback Tom Brady was originally not going to play due to his four-game suspension as a result of his involvement in the Deflategate scandal, but a court threw out the suspension on September 3, 2015, and ordered the league to let him play. It also marked the first time NFL Commissioner Roger Goodell did not attend a Kickoff Game, stating that he did not want to be a distraction.

2016: The Denver Broncos hosted the 2016 Kickoff Game at Sports Authority Field at Mile High against the Carolina Panthers on September 8, in a Super Bowl 50 rematch. (As the Republican and Democratic conventions were both scheduled for July 2016, there was no scheduling conflict with them as there was in 2008 and 2012, nor were there conflicts with any other sports team in Denver that night.) The Broncos debuted Trevor Siemian as their new starting quarterback after both quarterbacks who started games in 2015 left the team; Peyton Manning (who played the entirety of Super Bowl 50) retired and Brock Osweiler left as a free agent.

2017: The defending Super Bowl LI champions, the New England Patriots, hosted the Kansas City Chiefs for the 2017 Kickoff Game at Gillette Stadium, which the Chiefs won. Goodell visited Gillette Stadium for the Kickoff Game, having been absent from the venue since the 2014 season.

2018: The 2018 season kicked off with the defending Super Bowl LII champions, the Philadelphia Eagles, hosting the Atlanta Falcons at Lincoln Financial Field. The game was a rematch of the previous season's NFC Divisional Round matchup, in which Philadelphia won, before going on to win their first Super Bowl championship in franchise history. In the rematch, Philadelphia came out victorious again with a goal-line stand, much like their playoff matchup in the previous season.

2019: The Chicago Bears hosted the Green Bay Packers to begin the Bears' (and the league's) 100th season, which would be a reverse of a Week 1 matchup in 2018 where the Packers were the host on Sunday night to begin their own 100th season. This broke the tradition of having the Super Bowl champion host the game; the Super Bowl LIII champion New England Patriots instead hosted a Sunday Night Football game on opening weekend, against the Pittsburgh Steelers.

2020: The tradition of having the Super Bowl champion host the kickoff game was restored in 2020, when the Super Bowl LIV champion Kansas City Chiefs hosted the Houston Texans.

2021: The 2021 season kicked off in Tampa Bay between the defending Super Bowl LV champion Tampa Bay Buccaneers and the Dallas Cowboys. The game marked the return of Cowboys quarterback Dak Prescott after suffering a significant injury during Week 5 of the 2020 season; Prescott passed for 403 yards in a losing effort, as the Buccaneers secured a 31–29 victory with the winning points coming on a Ryan Succop field goal with two seconds left in the game.

2022: The 2022 season kicked off in Los Angeles with the defending Super Bowl LVI champion Los Angeles Rams hosting the Buffalo Bills. A moment of silence was held before the game for the United Kingdom's Queen Elizabeth II, who had died earlier that day. The Bills defeated the Rams 31–10, led by Josh Allen passing for 297 yards and 7 sacks by the Bills defense.

2023: The 2023 season kicked off in Kansas City with the defending Super Bowl LVII champion Kansas City Chiefs losing to the Detroit Lions 20–21 at home.

2024: The 2024 season kicked off for the second straight year in Kansas City with the defending Super Bowl LVIII champion Kansas City Chiefs defeating the Baltimore Ravens 27–20, in a rematch of the previous season's AFC Championship game.

2025: The 2025 season kicked off in Philadelphia with the defending Super Bowl LIX champion Philadelphia Eagles defeating their longtime NFC East division rival, the Dallas Cowboys 24–20.

2026: The 2026 game in Seattle, a rematch of Super Bowl LX with the New England Patriots visiting the defending champion Seattle Seahawks, was held instead on Wednesday, September 9, to accommodate an NFL International Series game in Australia on the following day.

== Game results ==
Season	Date	Visiting team		Home team		Stadium	Game notes
2002	September 5	San Francisco 49ers	16	New York Giants	13	Giants Stadium	Rivalry
2003	September 4	New York Jets	13	Washington Redskins	16	FedExField	
2004	September 9	Indianapolis Colts	24	New England Patriots*	27	Gillette Stadium	2003 AFC Championship Game rematch; Colts–Patriots rivalry; Tom Brady–Peyton Manning rivalry
2005	September 8	Oakland Raiders	20	New England Patriots*	30	Gillette Stadium	
2006	September 7	Miami Dolphins	17	Pittsburgh Steelers*	28	Heinz Field	First NFL game on NBC since 1997
2007	September 6	New Orleans Saints	10	Indianapolis Colts*	41	RCA Dome	
2008	September 4	Washington Redskins	7	New York Giants*	16	Giants Stadium	Rivalry
2009	September 10	Tennessee Titans	10	Pittsburgh Steelers*	13^{OT}	Heinz Field	Rivalry
2010	September 9	Minnesota Vikings	9	New Orleans Saints*	14	Louisiana Superdome	2009 NFC Championship Game rematch; rivalry
2011	September 8	New Orleans Saints	34	Green Bay Packers*	42	Lambeau Field	Matchup between the previous two Super Bowl champions: Packers (XLV) and Saints (XLIV)
2012	September 5	Dallas Cowboys	24	New York Giants*	17	MetLife Stadium	Rivalry
2013	September 5	Baltimore Ravens*	27	Denver Broncos	49	Sports Authority Field at Mile High	Game played in Denver due to scheduling conflict with the Baltimore Orioles; 2012 AFC divisional round rematch (Mile High Miracle)
2014	September 4	Green Bay Packers	16	Seattle Seahawks*	36	CenturyLink Field	Rivalry
2015	September 10	Pittsburgh Steelers	21	New England Patriots*	28	Gillette Stadium	Rivalry
2016	September 8	Carolina Panthers	20	Denver Broncos*	21	Sports Authority Field at Mile High	Super Bowl 50 rematch
2017	September 7	Kansas City Chiefs	42	New England Patriots*	27	Gillette Stadium	
2018	September 6	Atlanta Falcons	12	Philadelphia Eagles*	18	Lincoln Financial Field	2017 NFC divisional round rematch
2019	September 5	Green Bay Packers	10	Chicago Bears	3	Soldier Field	Bears–Packers rivalry
2020	September 10	Houston Texans	20	Kansas City Chiefs*	34	Arrowhead Stadium	2019 AFC divisional round rematch
2021	September 9	Dallas Cowboys	29	Tampa Bay Buccaneers*	31	Raymond James Stadium	
2022	September 8	Buffalo Bills	31	Los Angeles Rams*	10	SoFi Stadium	
2023	September 7	Detroit Lions	21	Kansas City Chiefs*	20	Arrowhead Stadium	
2024	September 5	Baltimore Ravens	20	Kansas City Chiefs*	27	Arrowhead Stadium	2023 AFC Championship Game rematch
2025	September 4	Dallas Cowboys	20	Philadelphia Eagles*	24	Lincoln Financial Field	Rivalry
2026	September 9	New England Patriots	10	Seattle Seahawks*	13	Lumen Field	Super Bowl LX rematch

* – Defending Super Bowl champion

== Win-loss records ==
Team	GP	W	L	Pct.	PF	PA
Denver Broncos	2	2	0	1.000	70	47
Philadelphia Eagles	2	2	0	1.000	42	32
Seattle Seahawks	2	2	0	1.000	49	26
Buffalo Bills	1	1	0	1.000	31	10
Detroit Lions	1	1	0	1.000	21	20
San Francisco 49ers	1	1	0	1.000	16	13
Tampa Bay Buccaneers	1	1	0	1.000	31	29
Kansas City Chiefs	4	3	1	.750	123	88
Green Bay Packers	3	2	1	.667	68	73
Pittsburgh Steelers	3	2	1	.667	62	55
New England Patriots	5	3	2	.600	122	120
Indianapolis Colts	2	1	1	.500	65	37
Washington Commanders	2	1	1	.500	23	29
Dallas Cowboys	3	1	2	.333	73	72
New Orleans Saints	3	1	2	.333	58	92
New York Giants	3	1	2	.333	46	47
Atlanta Falcons	1	0	1	.000	12	18
Carolina Panthers	1	0	1	.000	20	21
Chicago Bears	1	0	1	.000	3	10
Houston Texans	1	0	1	.000	20	34
Las Vegas Raiders	1	0	1	.000	20	30
Los Angeles Rams	1	0	1	.000	10	31
Miami Dolphins	1	0	1	.000	17	28
Minnesota Vikings	1	0	1	.000	9	14
New York Jets	1	0	1	.000	13	16
Tennessee Titans	1	0	1	.000	10	13
Baltimore Ravens	2	0	2	.000	47	76

Teams in the table are initially ordered based on winning percentage.

Key
GP	Games played
W	Wins
L	Losses
Pct.	Winning percentage
PF	Points for
PA	Points against

== Pre-game concerts ==
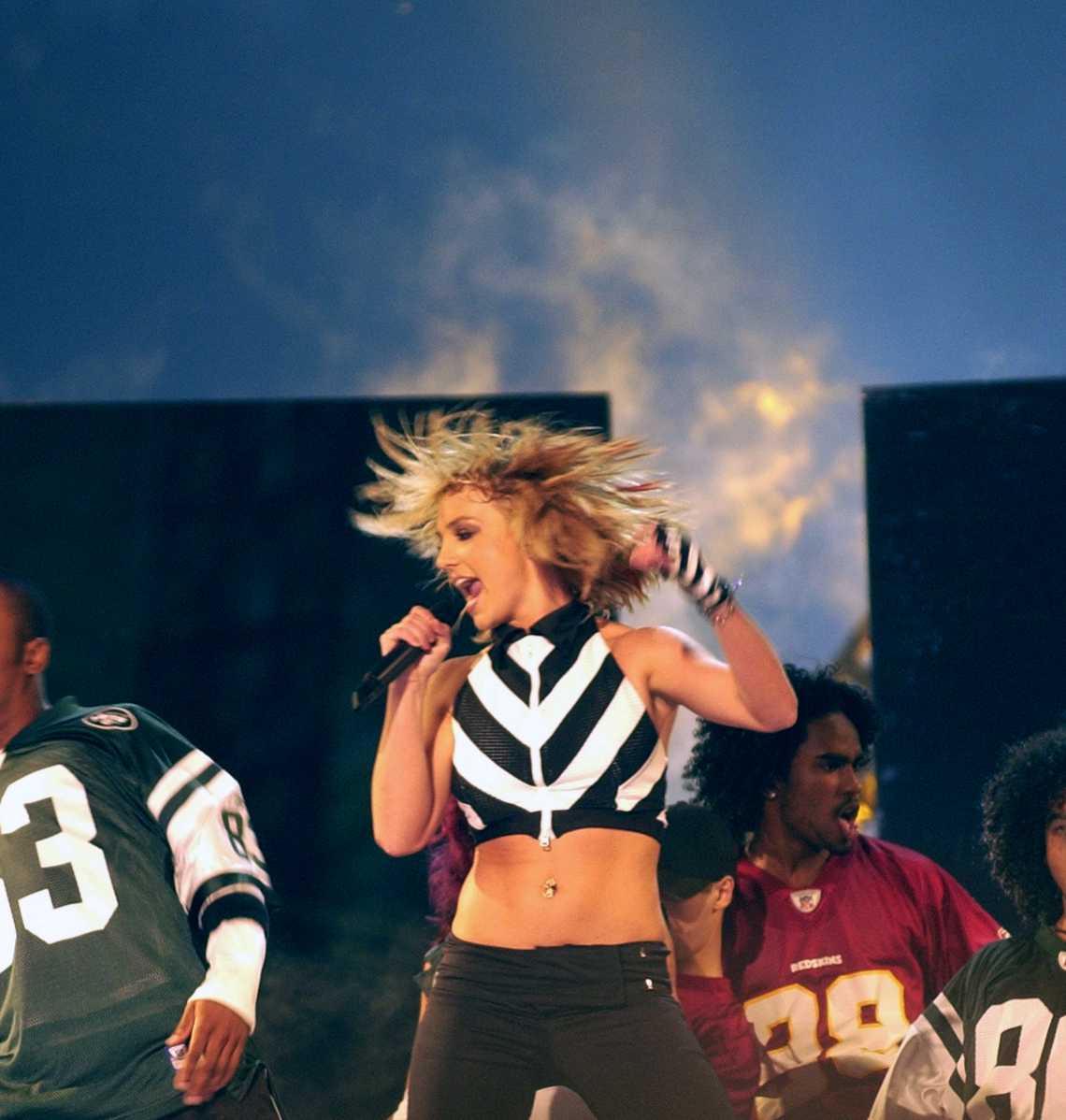
Britney Spears performing on the National Mall in Washington, D.C., 2003

- 2002: "NFL Kickoff Live from Times Square" started at 4:30 p.m. and led up to kickoff of the game at the Meadowlands. The concert was headlined by Bon Jovi (who also performed at halftime), and also featured Enrique Iglesias, Eve and Alicia Keys. The event included recognition and support of New York City's 9/11 memorial events.
- 2003: The event moved to the National Mall in Washington, D.C., and was billed as "NFL Kickoff Live From The National Mall Presented By Pepsi Vanilla." Britney Spears, who was introduced by Air Force Staff Sergeant Richard W. Duken II from Leesville LA, stationed at Tinker AFB, Aerosmith and Mary J. Blige headlined the concert. The activities started at 6 p.m. and featured a tribute to troops active in Iraq and Afghanistan, and was attended by thousands of American military personnel. ABC televised the concert live from 8 p.m. to 9 p.m. eastern. Aretha Franklin concluded the concert by singing the national anthem from the National Mall leading up to kickoff. Three weeks later, the United States Senate overwhelmingly passed legislation that, when enacted into law, limited displays of commercial sponsorship on the Mall.
- 2004: After initially being cancelled, the event was reinstated, and the 2004 "NFL Opening Kickoff" took place in two locations. At Gillette Stadium in Foxborough, Massachusetts, the New England Patriots were honored as Super Bowl XXXVIII champions. Performers at the stadium included Mary J. Blige, Destiny's Child, Elton John, Toby Keith, Lenny Kravitz, and the Boston Pops Orchestra, performing Heavy Action, the Monday Night Football theme song. Jessica Simpson performed from Metropolitan Park in Jacksonville, Florida, site of the upcoming Super Bowl. The concert aired live on ABC from 8 p.m. to 9 p.m., just prior to gametime. The 2004 festivities firmly established the tradition of holding the game and concert at the home of the defending Super Bowl champion, and also linking the event to the location of the upcoming Super Bowl.
- 2005: The fourth annual "NFL Opening Kickoff" featured concert activities from Gillette Stadium in Foxborough, Detroit (host of the upcoming Super Bowl XL), and Los Angeles. The Super Bowl XXXIX champion New England Patriots again were honored at the event, hosted by Freddie Prinze, Jr., and broadcast live on ABC. Performers at the stadium included Green Day, Carlos Santana, Michelle Branch, and a surprise appearance by Ozzy Osbourne, who emerged from a giant-sized helmet. The Rolling Stones were shown on video from a taped broadcast in Detroit. Kanye West, Maroon 5, Good Charlotte and Rihanna performed from a red-white-and-blue stage in Los Angeles. Trisha Yearwood concluded the hour-long concert by singing the national anthem back at Gillette Stadium.
- 2006: The Thursday night concert and game switched to NBC for 2006, and was billed as "NFL Opening Kickoff 2006 Presented by Sprint." The 30-minute concert broadcast live from Heinz Field in Pittsburgh, and from a special stage in South Beach in Miami Beach, near the home of the upcoming Super Bowl XLI. Diddy and Cassie entertained from Miami Beach, while Rascal Flatts were in Pittsburgh, along with Martina McBride, who sang the national anthem.
- 2007: "NFL Opening Kickoff 2007 Presented by Sprint" was aired on NBC as a thirty-minute special hosted by NFL Network anchor Rich Eisen. Kelly Clarkson was the first performer, singing on a sloped, outdoor stage at Monument Circle in downtown Indianapolis. The concert moved indoors to the RCA Dome with Indiana native John Mellencamp singing his classic hit "Small Town". Billy Joel followed, back outside at Monument Circle. Hinder also performed. Back inside the RCA Dome, Colts owner Jim Irsay unveiled the Super Bowl XLI championship banner. The event was marred by the death of a man who fell or jumped off the ninth-floor pool deck of the Sheraton City Center overlooking Monument Circle. Keyshia Cole wrapped up the show singing the national anthem with the Voices of Unity Youth Choir of Fort Wayne. Unlike in past years, there were no performances in the host area of the Super Bowl, in this case the Phoenix, Arizona area (Super Bowl XLII was held at University of Phoenix Stadium in suburban Glendale).
- 2008: Keith Urban and Usher were the featured performers at an afternoon concert at Columbus Circle in Midtown Manhattan in New York City on September 4. The concert was officially called "NFL Opening Kickoff 2008 Presented by EA Sports." Media coverage included NFL Network, NFL.com, and streaming on Sprint-branded mobile phones. NBC intercut portions of the concert into a broadcast of their 2008–09 season fall preview show the next night, September 5 at 9 pm ET/PT, 8 pm CT. (Unlike in past years, there was no live broadcast on NBC because of the early kickoff and later coverage of the 2008 Republican National Convention.)
- 2009: "NFL Opening Kickoff 2009 Presented by EA Sports" featured Tim McGraw and The Black Eyed Peas performing at Point State Park in Pittsburgh. Nancy O'Dell hosted the 30-minute concert on NBC. The Tim McGraw part of the concert was a part of the Music Video for song Southern Voice. Harry Connick Jr. sang the national anthem.
- 2010: "NFL Opening Kickoff 2010 Presented by EA Sports Madden NFL 11" featured Dave Matthews Band and Taylor Swift performing at Jackson Square in New Orleans. The network telecast – which for the second straight year was simulcast by NBC and NFL Network – was expanded to one hour. Pregame events ended inside the Superdome, where Harry Connick, Jr. rode in a Mardi Gras-style parade float into the stadium with team owner Tom Benson and introduced the unveiling of the Saints' championship banner from Super Bowl XLIV while Colbie Caillat sang the national anthem.
- 2011: "NFL Kickoff 2011 presented by EA Sports" was held at the parking lot of Lambeau Field near the Veterans Memorial. Kid Rock, Lady Antebellum, and Maroon 5 performed. Jordin Sparks sang the national anthem. The hour-long concert was to begin at 7:30 p.m., and was to be simulcast by NBC and NFL Network. However, for most of the nation, the pre-game coverage was switched to a simulcast at 7:00 p.m. on NFL Network, Syfy, Versus, USA, and G4 due to President Obama's primetime address to Congress. In contrast, the pregame coverage aired live as scheduled in New Orleans and most television markets in Wisconsin.
  - During the pregame, 32 legendary NFL players held team flags representing each of the 32 franchises. Bart Starr entered the stadium to represent the Packers. The other participants included: Ron Wolfley, Steve Bartkowski, Matt Stover, Andre Reed, Muhsin Muhammad, Richard Dent, Ken Anderson, Kevin Mack, Jay Novacek, Randy Gradishar, Charlie Sanders, N. D. Kalu, Bill Brooks, Don Davey, Willie Lanier, Dwight Stephenson, John Randle, John Hannah, Deuce McAllister, Harry Carson, Al Toon, Ted Hendricks, Eric Allen, Dermontti Dawson, Aeneas Williams, Junior Seau, Dwight Clark, Cortez Kennedy, Mike Alstott, Eddie George, Larry Brown.
- 2012: "NFL Kickoff 2012 presented by EA Sports" was held in New York City with a concert held by Mariah Carey, No Doubt and Cee Lo Green. The national anthem was sung by Queen Latifah accompanied by the Jubilation Choir.
- 2013: "NFL Kickoff 2013 presented by Pepsi" featured a concert at Baltimore's Inner Harbor, with performances by Danielle Bradbery who performed the national anthem and Keith Urban. The introduction to the game was done on the field by Ryan Seacrest, and culminated with a "countdown" to the start of the season starring 32 legendary NFL players (one from each franchise). A 34-minute weather delay due to lightning occurred immediately after the concert and delayed the kickoff of the game, pushing the kickoff to 9:10 ET, 7:10 local time in Denver.
- 2014: "NFL Kickoff 2014 presented by Xbox" was held outside Seattle's CenturyLink Field, with Pharrell Williams and Soundgarden performing. Ariana Grande performed the national anthem.
- 2015: "Kickoff to 50 presented by Hyundai" was held at the Justin Herman Plaza in San Francisco, California, the home of Super Bowl 50, with Ellie Goulding and Train performing. Dropkick Murphys, T-Pain, and the Springfield Symphony Orchestra performed at Gillette Stadium. Grace Potter sang the national anthem.
- 2016: "NFL Kickoff 2016 presented by Hyundai" was held at Civic Center Park, with Dierks Bentley and OneRepublic performing live. Andra Day sang the national anthem.
- 2017: "NFL Kickoff 2017 presented by Hyundai" was held at the Christopher Columbus Park at Boston Harborwalk, with the Boston-based Guster performing in place of Miguel, who was unable to perform due to an illness. Flo Rida also performed at the concert. The concert took place after a special screening of America's Game: The 2016 New England Patriots. Maren Morris performed the national anthem.
- 2018: "NFL Kickoff 2018 Driven by Hyundai" was held at Penn's Landing in Philadelphia, with Shawn Mendes performing. Boyz II Men sang the national anthem. A 45-minute weather delay due to a severe thunderstorm occurred immediately after the concert and delayed the kickoff of the game, pushing the kickoff back to 9:05 ET.
- 2019: "NFL Kickoff 2019 presented by EA Sports Madden NFL 20" was held at Grant Park in Chicago, with Meek Mill, Meghan Trainor and Rapsody performing. The concert was part of the league's Inspire Change initiative of which the three artists performing at the event were among the first advocates of the season. Chance the Rapper, was originally supposed to appear in the concert, but his performance was scrapped by the league. Chicago Blackhawks anthem singer Jim Cornelison sang the national anthem.
- 2020: Due to the COVID-19 pandemic, the NFL Kickoff Concert was canceled for this year, instead, the title sponsorship was given to EA Sports' Madden NFL 21 video game for this year's event. NBC aired the Queen Latifah hosted "Inspire Change" special a day prior to the kickoff. Alicia Keys sang "Lift Every Voice and Sing" and Chloe x Halle sang the national anthem.
- 2021: The "2021 NFL Kickoff Experience presented by EA Sports Madden NFL 22" was held at Julian B. Lane Riverfront Park. Alicia Keys, accompanied by the Florida A&M University Marching 100 and Concert Choir, sang "Lift Every Voice and Sing", and Michelle Williams accompanied by Cory Henry sang the national anthem. Victory Boyd was originally going to sing the anthem at the game, but her performance was cancelled due to her COVID-19 vaccine refusal, which she attributed to religious reasons. Ed Sheeran headlined the pre-game concert.
- 2022: The "2022 NFL Kickoff Experience presented by Verizon" was held at Alamitos Beach in Long Beach. Halle Bailey sang "Lift Every Voice and Sing" while Tinashe sang the national anthem. J. Balvin headlined the pre-game concert. Ozzy Osbourne performed at the halftime show.
- 2023: The Kansas City Boys and Girls Choir performed "Lift Every Voice and Sing" while Natalie Grant sang the national anthem.
- 2024: Tasha Cobbs Leonard sang "Lift Every Voice and Sing" while Coco Jones sang the national anthem.
- 2025: Laurin Talese sang "Lift Every Voice and Sing" while Boyz II Men sang the national anthem.
- 2026: The Mwango Sisters sang "Lift Every Voice and Sing" while Pearl Jam lead guitarist Mike McCready performed the national anthem and during the halftime show along with Seattle-based rock band Soundgarden and The Pretty Reckless lead singer Taylor Momsen. Fred Beam performed "Lift Ever Voice and Sing" and the national anthem in American Sign Language. Luke Bryan performed during the Salute 250 Kickoff Concert.

== Television ratings ==
Year	Network	Household rating/share	Viewers (live plus same day)	Ref.
2002	ESPN	7.6	10.8 million	
2003	ABC	12.9/22	19.2 million	
2004	ABC	11.4/20	16.9 million	
2005	ABC	11.7/21	18.0 million	
2006	NBC	12.6/21	19.2 million	
2007	NBC	11.5/20	17.8 million	
2008	NBC	8.6/15	13.5 million	
2009	NBC	12.8/22	20.9 million	
2010	NBC	16.5/28	27.5 million	
2011	NBC	16.0	27.2 million	
2012	NBC	14.7	23.9 million	
2013	NBC	14.9	25.1 million	
2014	NBC	15.5	26.9 million	
2015	NBC	16.2	27.4 million	
2016	NBC	14.6/27	25.2 million	
2017	NBC	12.6/23	22.2 million	
2018	NBC	12.30	19.3 million	
2019	NBC	15.30	22.0 million	
2020	NBC	11.2/23	20.3 million	
2021	NBC	TBA	26 million†	

† Preliminary figure
