= Cowboys–Giants rivalry =

National Football League rivalry

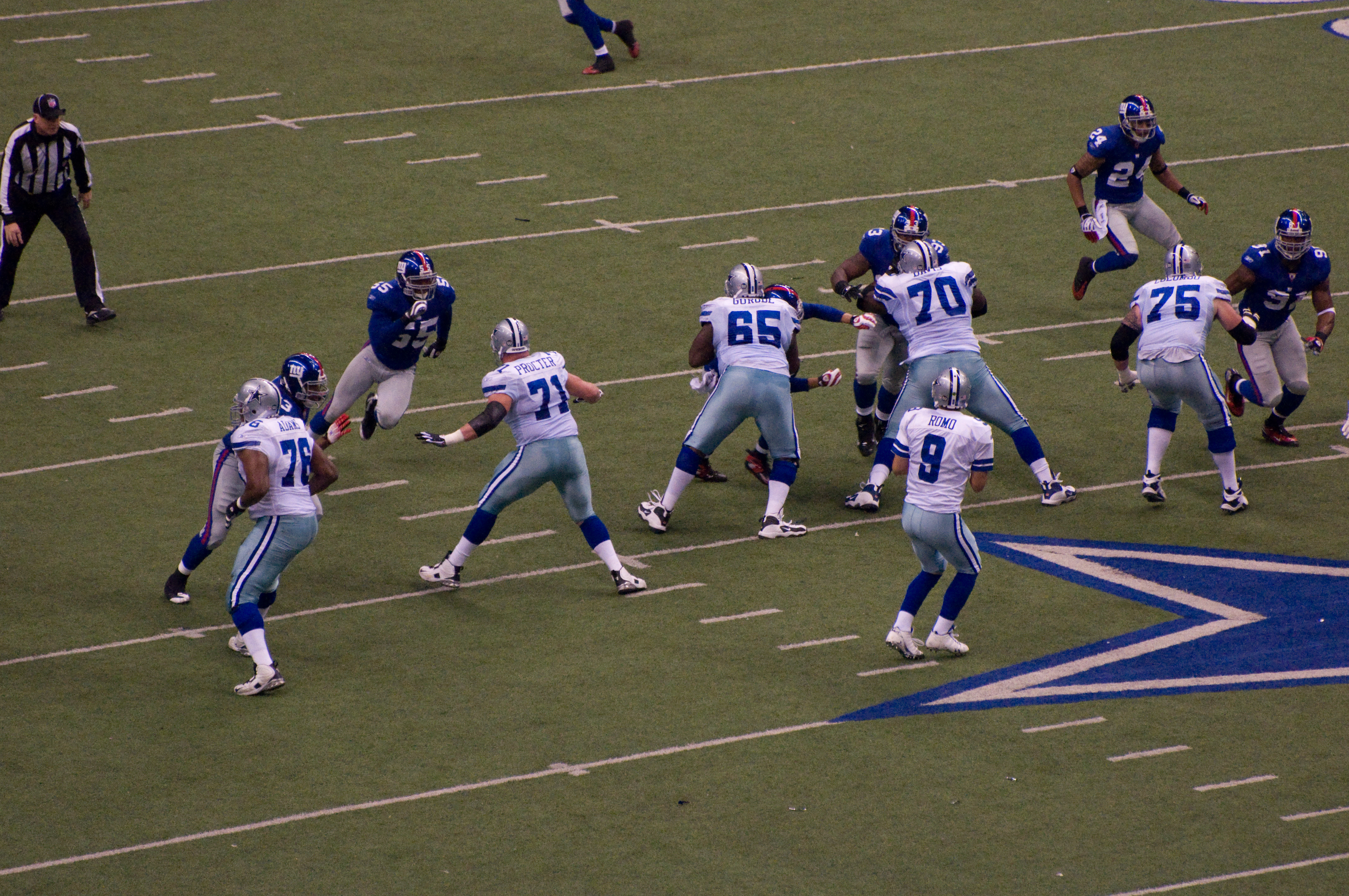
- Cowboys and Giants face off during the 2008 season.

- Dallas Cowboys New York Giants
- Location: Dallas, New York City
- First meeting: December 4, 1960; Giants 31, Cowboys 31
- Latest meeting: September 13, 2026; Giants 28, Cowboys 20
- Next meeting: January 3, 2027
- Stadiums: Cowboys: AT&T Stadium; Giants: MetLife Stadium

Statistics
- Total meetings: 129
- All-time series: Cowboys: 78–49–2
- Regular season series: Cowboys: 78–48–2
- Postseason results: Giants: 1–0
- Largest victory: Cowboys: 52–7 (1966); Giants: 41–10 (1962)
- Most points scored: Cowboys: 52 (1966); Giants: 41 (1962), (2010)
- Longest win streak: Cowboys: 12 (1974–1980); Giants: 6 (1988–1990)
- Current win streak: Giants: 2 (2025–present)

Post–season history
- 2007 NFC Divisional: Giants won: 21–17

The Cowboys–Giants rivalry is a National Football League (NFL) rivalry between the Dallas Cowboys and the New York Giants.

The Cowboys began their play in the 1960 season; however, it was in the subsequent season that they transitioned to the Eastern Division, establishing a divisional rivalry with the Giants. In the early 1960s the New York Giants were beginning to wind down as an NFL powerhouse and entered a period of poor play where they did not make the playoffs from 1964 to 1980. While the Giants dominated the Cowboys in the first few years of the rivalry, the Cowboys picked up steam and took control from the mid-1960s to the early 1980s, winning 17 of the 20 meetings between the two teams in the 1970s. In the 1980s however the Giants struck back, and the rivalry has been relatively even handed ever since with intermittent spurts of dominance (the Giants in the late 1980s and the Cowboys in the early 1990s). The rivalry would also swing in favor of the Giants during the 2000s and early 2010s. Recent history has swung back in favor of the Cowboys, as they have beaten the Giants eleven out of the last twelve matchups since 2017, and 20 of the last 26 matchups since 2013.

This rivalry stands out in American sports because no other team from Texas shares a division with a team from the New York area, nor has a sustained rivalry with one, primarily due to the significant geographical separation between the two regions.

The Cowboys lead the overall series, 78–49–2. The two teams have met once in the playoffs, with the Giants holding a 1–0 record.

== Notable rivalry moments ==
=== 1960s ===
- Cowboys 31, Giants 31 (December 4, 1960) – The first meeting between the Cowboys and Giants occurred in 1960 at Yankee Stadium. The game ended in a 31–31 tie. Eddie LeBaron threw three touchdowns for Dallas including two in the fourth quarter, while George Shaw and Lee Grosscup combined for three touchdown throws for the Giants. L. G. Dupree ran for a Dallas touchdown and caught two scores. This was the first game in franchise history in which the Cowboys did not lose, as they opened their inaugural season with ten straight losses.
- Hall of Fame coach Tom Landry was one of the most fateful figures in the history of both franchises. Drafted by the Giants in 1947, he played multiple roles – defensive back, halfback, and quarterback – and in those roles he recorded one rushing touchdown, one passing touchdown, two touchdowns off fumble recoveries, and three touchdowns off INTs. He made one Pro Bowl as a player, in 1954, the same season he joined the Giants' coaching staff. After he retired as a player at the end of the 1955 season, he became the Giants' defensive coordinator inventing the 4-3 Defense, serving in that role through 1959. In 1960, he became head coach of the first-year Cowboys and in his 29 seasons went 35–16–2 against the Giants. According to The Last Cowboy: A Life of Tom Landry, by Long Island author Mark Ribowsky, Tom Landry's widow, Alicia, claims that after the way the Jones family treated her husband when they purchased the team, that the long-time coach no longer followed the team and went back to being a fan of the Giants until his death in 2000.

=== 1970s ===
- Cowboys 20, Giants 13 (October 11, 1971) – The Cowboys defeated the Giants 20–13 in the first Monday Night Football meeting between the teams and the last NFL game at the Cotton Bowl.

=== 1980s ===
- Giants 13, Cowboys 10 (OT) (December 19, 1981) – The Giants defeated the Cowboys 13–10 in overtime on a frigid Saturday afternoon in Giants Stadium to clinch the Giants' first playoff berth in 17 seasons. Joe Danelo kicked the winning field goal in overtime after missing a potential game-winner earlier in the extra period.

=== 1990s ===
- Cowboys 16, Giants 13 (OT) (January 2, 1994) – In the final game of the 1993 season, with both teams at 11–4 and competing for the #1 seed in the NFC playoffs, Cowboys running back Emmitt Smith suffered a separated right shoulder in the first half, but continued to play in obvious pain, amassing 168 rushing yards, including 41 on the game-winning drive, as Dallas won 16–13 in overtime. Smith also locked up the NFL rushing title with his tough, gritty performance. After the game, sportscaster John Madden paid a visit to Smith in the locker room to congratulate him, the only time Madden (as an announcer) would pay such a visit to a player, later writing "[It] was one of the toughest efforts I've ever seen by any football player in any game."[8] The loss meant the Giants were the #4 seed, while the win earned the Cowboys the #1 seed (and a bye in the playoffs), giving Smith time to heal, and he would go on to lead the Cowboys to victory over the Buffalo Bills as the MVP of Super Bowl XXVIII. Meanwhile, the Giants would defeat the Minnesota Vikings 17–10 in the wild-card round before falling to the San Francisco 49ers the following week.
- Cowboys 38, Giants 10 (November 7, 1994) – The 7–1 Cowboys hosted the 3–5 Giants as two-time defending Super Bowl champions. After a scoreless first quarter, a touchdown pass from Troy Aikman to Alvin Harper and a one-yard Emmitt Smith rushing score left the Cowboys up 14–3. On the final play of the first half, Aikman launched a long pass to Harper in the end zone; Harper was hit in mid-air by Giants safety Tito Wooten and suffered a sprained left knee. Cowboys receivers coach Hubbard Alexander then attacked Jarvis Williams of the Giants and Michael Irvin punched Williams with a helmet. As the brawl escalated, Cowboys safety James Washington grabbed a camera and monopod from a local photographer and brandished it like a sword, yelling for Giants players to take him on. Irvin was fined $12,000 and Washington $10,000 by the league. When order was finally restored, the Cowboys defeated the Giants 38–10.
- Giants 13, Cowboys 10 (October 18, 1999) – The Giants offense was stagnant most of the evening, but two missed Dallas field goals and a red zone interception by safety Sam Garnes kept the score low, while Emmitt Smith was held to just 26 yards rushing on 22 carries. The game was tied 3–3 in the fourth quarter before Tiki Barber returned a Toby Gowin punt 85 yards for a touchdown. With two minutes left, Smith tied the game with a two-yard touchdown run; but on the ensuing drive, quarterback Kent Graham found Barber out of the backfield for a 56-yard catch-and-run all the way down to the three-yard line. A 21-yard field goal by Brad Daluiso gave the Giants the lead with one second remaining. The final kickoff saw Deion Sanders scrambling to the 25-yard line before pitching the ball to Kevin Mathis, who dashed all the way to New York's 20 before lateraling to Singor Mobley, who raced all the way to the endzone. However, Sanders was flagged for an illegal forward pass, ending the game in a Giants win. Barber finished with 233 all-purpose yards, as the Giants defeated the Cowboys for the first time on Monday Night Football after losing the first seven meetings.

=== 2000s ===
- Cowboys 35, Giants 32 (September 15, 2003) – In 2003, the teams met at Giants Stadium on Monday Night Football. The game marked former Giants head coach Bill Parcells' first visit to Giants Stadium as head coach of the Cowboys. The Cowboys led 29–14 after three quarters, but they lost the lead over the last 15 minutes and found themselves down 32–29 with 11 seconds to play. The Giants simply needed to kick off and play a "prevent" defense for 1 or 2 plays, but the kickoff went out of bounds, putting the Cowboys at their own 40 with no time elapsed, and Quincy Carter completed a deep pass to Antonio Bryant, who went out of bounds at the New York 34 to stop the clock with four seconds left. Billy Cundiff then converted a 52-yard field goal as time expired to send the game to overtime and kicked a 25-yard field goal in the extra session to win the game for the Cowboys. Cundiff tied an NFL record with seven field goals in the game 35–32.
- Giants 21, Cowboys 17 (January 13, 2008) – In 2007, the Cowboys swept the Giants in the regular season, winning the NFC East with a record of 13–3 and No. 1 Seed in the NFC. However, in the division round of the playoffs, the 5-seed Giants (10–6) went into Texas Stadium and stunned the top-seeded Cowboys 21–17 en route to winning Super Bowl XLII against the New England Patriots.
- Cowboys 20, Giants 8 (December 14, 2008) – Amid several weeks of off-field acrimony involving Terrell Owens, Tony Romo, Jason Witten, Marion Barber, and owner Jerry Jones, the Cowboys shut down the Giants in New York's final trip to Texas Stadium (and first since the 2007 playoffs), 20–8. Owens and Witten combined for eight catches for 82 yards while Patrick Crayton and Deon Anderson had two receiving scores. Romo completed 20 of 30 throws for 244 yards despite being sacked four times (once for a Giants safety) and injuring his back in the process. The Cowboys sacked Giants quarterback Eli Manning eight times and limited him to only 191 passing yards and two interceptions snatched by Terence Newman.
- Giants 33, Cowboys 31 (September 20, 2009) – Lawrence Tynes made a 37-yard field goal as the game clock expired to give the Giants a 33–31 victory over the Cowboys and spoil the opening of the new Cowboys Stadium, with a crowd of a record-breaking 105,121 people. After the game, Giants quarterback Eli Manning signed the wall of the visiting locker room and wrote "'33–31' First win in the new stadium" next to his name.

=== 2010s ===
- Giants 41, Cowboys 35 (October 25, 2010) – the Giants defeated the Cowboys in Cowboys Stadium 41–35, leaving the Cowboys at a disappointing 1–5 for the year. This contest is notable for the Giants linebacker Michael Boley driving Tony Romo to the turf and causing Romo to break his left clavicle and most likely ending the Cowboys chances at a playoff run.
- Cowboys 33, Giants 20 (November 14, 2010) – Jason Garrett made his head coaching debut for the Cowboys in the 2010 rematch against the Giants on November 14. The Cowboys raced to a 19–3 lead and won 33–20, intercepting Eli Manning twice (Bryan McCann picked off Manning in the end zone and scored from 101 yards out) while Jon Kitna had three touchdowns. This game is also remembered for a power outage that disrupted play for about 15 minutes.
- Giants 37, Cowboys 34 (December 11, 2011) – During the teams' first meeting of the season, with the NFC East lead on the line, the Cowboys led the Giants 34–22 with 5:41 left to play. Eli Manning led the Giants to a comeback by scoring 15 points, and the Giants' Jason Pierre-Paul blocked Dallas kicker Dan Bailey's game-tying field goal with 6 seconds remaining. The Giants took a knee with 1 second left and won the game 37–34. This game was selected as #2 on Top 20 NFL Games of 2011.
- Giants 31, Cowboys 14 (January 1, 2012) – The Giants hosted the Cowboys in what amounted to a de facto NFC East championship game. Both teams entered the game with identical 8–7 records and a share of the lead of the NFC East. With the division title and a playoff berth on the line the game was flexed to the 8:30 pm Sunday Night Football slot. While the Giants took a 21–0 halftime lead, Tony Romo brought the Cowboys back, making the score 21–14 early in the 4th quarter. The Giants would hold on however, winning 31–14 and earning their first NFC East Division title and playoff berth since 2008 while knocking the Cowboys out of the playoffs. The Giants eventually won Super Bowl XLVI against the New England Patriots.
- Giants 29, Cowboys 24 (October 28, 2012) – The Cowboys and the Giants played for a second time in the 2012 season at Dallas. The Giants looked to avenge themselves after losing the season opening game to the Cowboys at home. The Giants took an astounding 23–0 lead in the 2nd quarter partly because of three Tony Romo interceptions. The Cowboys rallied up to make the game 23–10 before halftime. The Cowboys took the third quarter 14–0 to take a 24–23 lead. Eli Manning led two successful drives for New York both resulting in a field goal regaining a 29–24 lead. The Cowboys had less than four minutes to score a touchdown and take the lead. On fourth down, in the Giants territory, Tony Romo was pressured and forced to throw yet another interception. The Cowboys used all three remaining timeouts during that Giants' possession and forced the Giants to punt and got the ball back with under a minute remaining. Tony Romo threw a pass into the end zone with ten seconds left to Dez Bryant and the play was ruled a touchdown. The play was reviewed and the officials noticed that the first part of the receiver to touch the ground was his hand, which was partially out of bounds. The call was reversed, and the play was ruled an incomplete pass. The Cowboys failed to score a touchdown, and the Giants held on to win 29–24.
- Cowboys 31, Giants 28 (November 23, 2014) – In the second meeting during the 2014 season, Giants wide receiver Odell Beckham Jr. had 10 catches for 146 yards and two touchdowns, including a one-handed touchdown reception hailed as the "catch of the year", with Cris Collinsworth, Tony Dungy, and Victor Cruz all saying that it was one of the best catches ever. Beckham made this catch despite a pass interference penalty called on Dallas's Brandon Carr while diving backwards with full extension of his right hand using only three fingers. On December 8, 2014, the Pro Football Hall of Fame put Beckham's game-worn jersey from his famous one-handed catch game vs. Dallas on display. While that score made it 14–3 in favor of the Giants, the Cowboys rallied back, winning the game on Romo's 13-yard touchdown pass to Bryant with 1:01 to go in the fourth quarter to secure a come-from-behind 31–28 win and complete a season sweep of the series.
- Giants 10, Cowboys 7 (December 11, 2016) – The Giants and Cowboys met again at MetLife Stadium in Week 14 of the 2016 season in a showdown on Sunday Night Football. The Cowboys were riding 11–1 while the Giants were just coming off a tough loss to the Pittsburgh Steelers. The Cowboys were the favorite to win, but the Giants only allowed one touchdown to the Cowboys as the Giants won again 10–7 sweeping the Cowboys for the first time since 2011.
- Cowboys 37, Giants 18 (November 4, 2019) – During the team's second meeting of the 2019 season on Monday Night Football, a black cat ran onto the field at MetLife Stadium with the Giants leading 9–3 and delayed the game for two minutes until it left. Afterward, the Cowboys went on to beat the Giants for a 37–18 win. The incident led to social media memes and videos spoofing the cat as an NFL player, some of which used Kevin Harlan’s bemused radio call of the cat running into the end zone.

=== 2020s ===
- Giants 23, Cowboys 19 (January 3, 2021) – The Giants held off a late Cowboys rally to win 23–19; with the entire NFC East slumping to a possible three-way division tie at 6–10. The Giants win would allow them to clinch the NFC East if the Washington Football Team lost their game to the Philadelphia Eagles later that night. However, Washington won its game and clinched the division title.
- 2021 NFL Draft Day Trade (April 29, 2021) – During the 2021 NFL draft, in a rare collaborative move, the Eagles traded a third-round pick and their 12th overall pick for Dallas's 10th overall pick. The purpose of this trade for the Eagles was to select Heisman Trophy winning wide receiver DeVonta Smith ahead of fellow divisional rivals, the New York Giants, who were sitting in the 11th spot. This move reportedly made the Giants front office "livid".
- Cowboys 44, Giants 20 (October 10, 2021) – The Cowboys decimated the Giants 44–20 in a grossly one-sided game. Early in the game, starting New York Giants quarterback Daniel Jones was badly concussed and left the game after getting hit in the head by Dallas rookie linebacker, Jabril Cox. Later in the game, during a massive scuffle between the two teams, 1st Round rookie Kadarius Toney, threw a punch at Dallas safety Damontae Kazee and was immediately ejected. In the days that followed, Giants tight end Evan Engram claimed Cowboys safety Jayron Kearse "sucker punched" him by stating, "I walked up on him. He walked up on me kinda, saying some stuff. He threw the punch. We had some guys there that separated us, so it was kind of boom, boom. He stole one off..." Engram also stated, "It was a little baby punch anyway. It was soft". Jayron Kearse later denied the claim on Twitter, "Boy said I punched him lol. He’s nuts". Fox executives deferred to the NFL when asked to supply video of the incident. A league spokesman said that NFL Films employees checked and that there is no video of the incident in question.
- Cowboys 23, Giants 16 (September 26, 2022) – Subbing for injured starter Dak Prescott, former Giants backup quarterback Cooper Rush led the team to victory. After cornerback Trevon Diggs came away with a game-sealing interception late in the fourth quarter, Dallas’ offense marched onto the field with 1:14 remaining on the clock to kneel out the rest of the game. Instead of getting a head start on the post-game handshakes, however, players from both teams started jawing back and forth until a full-on skirmish broke out on the field.
- Cowboys 40, Giants 0 (September 10, 2023) – In a rain-soaked game played during Week 1 at the Meadowlands, a dominant Cowboys defense shut out the New York Giants and scored two touchdowns from the result of a blocked kick return and an interception return. The Cowboys sacked Daniel Jones seven times, which was the most sacks in a season opener by a Dallas defense since it had nine in 1994. This marked the third shutout loss for the Giants, as well as the highest shutout loss they had sustained (their previous highest shutout loss was 35–0 Dallas in 1995). No team in NFL history had lost a game by 40 or more points, lost a sack battle by 7 or more, lost a turnover battle by 3–0 or more, had a field goal blocked and returned for a touchdown, and thrown a pick-6; all in one season. The Cowboys did it all to the Giants on the same night.

== Season-by-season results ==
Dallas Cowboys vs. New York Giants Season-by-Season Results
1960s (Cowboys, 9–6–2)

| Season | Season series | at Dallas Cowboys | at New York Giants | Overall series | Notes |
|---|---|---|---|---|---|
| 1960 | Tie 0–0–1 | no game | Tie; 31–31 | Tie; 0–0–1 | Cowboys join the National Football League (NFL) as an expansion team. They are placed in the NFL Western Conference. Cowboys hire Giants' defensive coordinator Tom Landry as their inaugural head coach. With the tie, the Cowboys snapped their 10-game losing streak and recorded the first tie — and first result that wasn’t a loss — in franchise history. It would go on to be their only result that wasn't a loss in their 1960 inaugural season. |
| 1961 | Tie 1–1 | Giants; 31–10 | Cowboys; 17–16 | Tie; 1–1–1 | Cowboys are moved to the NFL Eastern Conference with the addition of the Minnesota Vikings to the NFL, resulting in two annual meetings with the Giants. Giants lose 1961 NFL Championship Game. |
| 1962 | Giants 2–0 | Giants; 41–10 | Giants; 41–31 | Giants; 3–1–1 | In Dallas, Giants record their largest victory against the Cowboys with a 31–point differential. Both games saw the Giants score their most points in a game against the Cowboys. Giants lose 1962 NFL Championship Game. |
| 1963 | Giants 2–0 | Giants; 34–27 | Giants; 37–21 | Giants; 5–1–1 | Giants lose 1963 NFL Championship Game. |
| 1964 | Cowboys 1–0–1 | Tie; 13–13 | Cowboys; 31–21 | Giants; 5–2–2 | |
| 1965 | Cowboys 2–0 | Cowboys; 31–2 | Cowboys; 38–20 | Giants; 5–4–2 | Last season Giants held the overall series record. |
| 1966 | Cowboys 2–0 | Cowboys; 52–7 | Cowboys; 17–7 | Cowboys; 6–5–2 | Cowboys take the overall series record. In Dallas, Cowboys record their largest victory against the Giants with a 45–point differential and score their most points in a game against the Giants. Cowboys lose 1966 NFL Championship Game. |
| 1967 | Cowboys 1–0 | Cowboys; 38–24 | no game | Cowboys; 7–5–2 | As a result of expansion, the two eight-team divisions became two eight-team conferences split into two divisions. The Cowboys are placed in the NFL Capitol division, while the Giants and New Orleans Saints alternate between the Capitol and NFL Century Divisions each year. This resulted in only a single meeting between the Giants and Cowboys in 1967 and 1969. Cowboys lose 1967 NFL Championship. |
| 1968 | Tie 1–1 | Giants; 27–21 | Cowboys; 28–10 | Cowboys; 8–6–2 | |
| 1969 | Cowboys 1–0 | Cowboys; 25–3 | no game | Cowboys; 9–6–2 | |

1970s (Cowboys, 17–3)

| Season | Season series | at Dallas Cowboys | at New York Giants | Overall series | Notes |
|---|---|---|---|---|---|
| 1970 | Tie 1–1 | Cowboys; 28–10 | Giants; 23–20 | Cowboys; 10–7–2 | As a result of the AFL–NFL merger, the Cowboys and Giants were placed in the NFC East. Cowboys lose Super Bowl V. |
| 1971 | Cowboys 2–0 | Cowboys; 20–13 | Cowboys; 42–14 | Cowboys; 12–7–2 | Cowboys open Texas Stadium midway through the season. Cowboys win Super Bowl VI. |
| 1972 | Tie 1–1 | Giants; 23–3 | Cowboys; 23–14 | Cowboys; 13–8–2 | |
| 1973 | Cowboys 2–0 | Cowboys; 45–28 | Cowboys; 23–10 | Cowboys; 15–8–2 | Due to renovations at Yankee Stadium, Giants' home game was played at Yale Bowl in New Haven, Connecticut. |
| 1974 | Tie 1–1 | Giants; 14–6 | Cowboys; 21–7 | Cowboys; 16–9–2 | Giants' home game was played at Yale Bowl. |
| 1975 | Cowboys 2–0 | Cowboys; 14–3 | Cowboys; 13–7 | Cowboys; 18–9–2 | Giants' home game was played at Shea Stadium in New York. Cowboys lose Super Bowl X. |
| 1976 | Cowboys 2–0 | Cowboys; 9–3 | Cowboys; 24–14 | Cowboys; 20–9–2 | Giants open Giants Stadium. |
| 1977 | Cowboys 2–0 | Cowboys; 41–21 | Cowboys; 24–10 | Cowboys; 22–9–2 | Cowboys win Super Bowl XII. |
| 1978 | Cowboys 2–0 | Cowboys; 24–3 | Cowboys; 34–24 | Cowboys; 24–9–2 | Cowboys lose Super Bowl XIII. |
| 1979 | Cowboys 2–0 | Cowboys; 28–7 | Cowboys; 16–14 | Cowboys; 26–9–2 | Cowboys win 9 straight road meetings (1971–1979). Starting with their home win against the Giants, the Cowboys went on a 18-game regular-season home winning streak. |

1980s (Tie, 9–9)

| Season | Season series | at Dallas Cowboys | at New York Giants | Overall series | Notes |
|---|---|---|---|---|---|
| 1980 | Tie 1–1 | Cowboys; 24–3 | Giants; 38–35 | Cowboys; 27–10–2 | Cowboys won 12 straight meetings (1974–1980). |
| 1981 | Tie 1–1 | Cowboys; 18–10 | Giants; 13–10 (OT) | Cowboys; 28–11–2 | Giants' win, coupled with a Jets win against the Packers, clinched them their first playoff berth since the 1963 season. |
| 1982 | canceled | | | Cowboys; 28–11–2 | Due to the 1982 NFL players strike, both games were canceled. |
| 1983 | Cowboys 2–0 | Cowboys; 28–13 | Cowboys; 38–20 | Cowboys; 30–11–2 | |
| 1984 | Giants 2–0 | Giants; 19–7 | Giants; 28–7 | Cowboys; 30–13–2 | Giants' first season series sweep against the Cowboys since the 1963 season. Both teams finished with 9–7 records, but the Giants clinched a playoff berth based on their head-to-head sweep, eliminating the Cowboys from playoff contention. |
| 1985 | Cowboys 2–0 | Cowboys; 28–21 | Cowboys; 30–29 | Cowboys; 32–13–2 | Both teams finished with 10–6 records, but the Cowboys clinched the NFC East based on their head-to-head sweep. |
| 1986 | Tie 1–1 | Cowboys; 31–28 | Giants; 17–14 | Cowboys; 33–14–2 | Giants win Super Bowl XXI. |
| 1987 | Cowboys 2–0 | Cowboys; 33–24 | Cowboys; 16–14 | Cowboys; 35–14–2 | Cowboys' win in New York snapped the Giants' 12-game home winning streak. |
| 1988 | Giants 2–0 | Giants; 12–10 | Giants; 29–21 | Cowboys; 35–16–2 | Last season for Cowboys' head coach Tom Landry. |
| 1989 | Giants 2–0 | Giants; 30–13 | Giants; 15–0 | Cowboys; 35–18–2 | Cowboys draft QB Troy Aikman. |

1990s (Cowboys, 12–8)

| Season | Season series | at Dallas Cowboys | at New York Giants | Overall series | Notes |
|---|---|---|---|---|---|
| 1990 | Giants 2–0 | Giants; 28–7 | Giants; 31–17 | Cowboys; 35–20–2 | Giants win Super Bowl XXV. |
| 1991 | Tie 1–1 | Cowboys; 21–16 | Giants; 22–9 | Cowboys; 36–21–2 | |
| 1992 | Cowboys 2–0 | Cowboys; 30–3 | Cowboys; 34–28 | Cowboys; 38–21–2 | Game in Dallas was played on Thanksgiving. Cowboys win Super Bowl XXVII. |
| 1993 | Cowboys 2–0 | Cowboys; 31–9 | Cowboys; 16–13 (OT) | Cowboys; 40–21–2 | In New York, Cowboys clinched the NFC East, a first-round bye, and home-field advantage throughout the NFC playoffs as the NFC's #1 seed with their win. Cowboys win Super Bowl XXVIII. |
| 1994 | Tie 1–1 | Cowboys; 38–10 | Giants; 15–10 | Cowboys; 41–22–2 | |
| 1995 | Cowboys 2–0 | Cowboys; 21–20 | Cowboys; 35–0 | Cowboys; 43–22–2 | Cowboys win Super Bowl XXX. |
| 1996 | Tie 1–1 | Cowboys; 27–0 | Giants; 20–6 | Cowboys; 44–23–2 | |
| 1997 | Giants 2–0 | Giants; 20–7 | Giants; 20–17 | Cowboys; 44–25–2 | |
| 1998 | Cowboys 2–0 | Cowboys; 16–6 | Cowboys; 31–7 | Cowboys; 46–25–2 | |
| 1999 | Tie 1–1 | Cowboys; 26–18 | Giants; 13–10 | Cowboys; 47–26–2 | |

2000s (Giants, 13–8)

| Season | Season series | at Dallas Cowboys | at New York Giants | Overall series | Notes |
|---|---|---|---|---|---|
| 2000 | Giants 2–0 | Giants; 17–13 | Giants; 19–14 | Cowboys; 47–28–2 | Last season for Cowboys' quarterback Troy Aikman. Giants lose Super Bowl XXXV. |
| 2001 | Tie 1–1 | Cowboys; 20–13 | Giants; 27–24 (OT) | Cowboys; 48–29–2 | In New York, Giants overcame a 24–7 second half deficit. |
| 2002 | Giants 2–0 | Giants; 21–17 | Giants; 37–7 | Cowboys; 48–31–2 | |
| 2003 | Cowboys 2–0 | Cowboys; 19–3 | Cowboys; 35–32 (OT) | Cowboys; 50–31–2 | In New York, Cowboys' kicker Billy Cundiff successfully converts seven field goals, tying an NFL record (broken by Rob Bironas in 2007). |
| 2004 | Giants 2–0 | Giants; 26–10 | Giants; 28–24 | Cowboys; 50–33–2 | |
| 2005 | Tie 1–1 | Cowboys; 16–13 (OT) | Giants; 17–10 | Cowboys; 51–34–2 | |
| 2006 | Tie 1–1 | Giants; 36–22 | Cowboys; 23–20 | Cowboys; 52–35–2 | Road team splits the season series for the first time since the 1974 season. |
| 2007 | Cowboys 2–0 | Cowboys; 45–35 | Cowboys; 31–20 | Cowboys; 54–35–2 | Cowboys' win in Dallas was the Giants' only road loss in the 2007 season. |
| 2007 Playoffs | Giants 1–0 | Giants; 21–17 | —N/a | Cowboys; 54–36–2 | NFC Divisional Round. Giants go on to win Super Bowl XLII. |
| 2008 | Tie 1–1 | Cowboys; 20–8 | Giants; 35–14 | Cowboys; 55–37–2 | Last matchup at Texas Stadium. |
| 2009 | Giants 2–0 | Giants; 33–31 | Giants; 31–24 | Cowboys; 55–39–2 | Game in Dallas is the Cowboys' inaugural game at Cowboys Stadium (now known as AT&T Stadium), which saw Giants' quarterback Eli Manning signing the wall following their win. The Giants won the game on a field goal as time expired. The game drew a crowd of 105,121, setting an NFL regular-season attendance record. |

2010s (Cowboys, 13–7)

| Season | Season series | at Dallas Cowboys | at New York Giants | Overall series | Notes |
|---|---|---|---|---|---|
| 2010 | Tie 1–1 | Giants; 41–35 | Cowboys; 33–20 | Cowboys; 56–40–2 | Giants open New Meadowlands Stadium (now known as MetLife Stadium). In Dallas, Giants tied for their most points scored in a game against the Cowboys (1962). |
| 2011 | Giants 2–0 | Giants; 37–34 | Giants; 31–14 | Cowboys; 56–42–2 | In Dallas, Giants overcame a 34–22 fourth quarter deficit. In New York, Giants clinched the NFC East and eliminated the Cowboys from playoff contention with their win. Giants win Super Bowl XLVI. |
| 2012 | Tie 1–1 | Giants; 29–24 | Cowboys; 24–17 | Cowboys; 57–43–2 | Game in New York is the NFL Kickoff Game. In Dallas, Dez Bryant has apparent game-winning touchdown overturned by replay. |
| 2013 | Cowboys 2–0 | Cowboys; 36–31 | Cowboys; 24–21 | Cowboys; 59–43–2 | Cowboys record their first win over the Giants at AT&T Stadium. |
| 2014 | Cowboys 2–0 | Cowboys; 31–21 | Cowboys; 31–28 | Cowboys; 61–43–2 | In New York, Giants' wide receiver Odell Beckham Jr. makes a famous one-handed catch. |
| 2015 | Tie 1–1 | Cowboys; 27–26 | Giants; 27–20 | Cowboys; 62–44–2 | |
| 2016 | Giants 2–0 | Giants; 20–19 | Giants; 10–7 | Cowboys; 62–46–2 | Final season for Cowboys' quarterback Tony Romo, and first season for Cowboys' quarterback Dak Prescott. Following their home loss to the Giants, the Cowboys went on an 11‑game winning streak, which was snapped when they lost again to the Giants in New York. |
| 2017 | Cowboys 2–0 | Cowboys; 19–3 | Cowboys; 30–10 | Cowboys; 64–46–2 | |
| 2018 | Cowboys 2–0 | Cowboys; 20–13 | Cowboys; 36–35 | Cowboys; 66–46–2 | |
| 2019 | Cowboys 2–0 | Cowboys; 35–17 | Cowboys; 37–18 | Cowboys; 68–46–2 | Final season for Giants' quarterback Eli Manning. |

2020s (Cowboys, 10–3)

| Season | Season series | at Dallas Cowboys | at New York Giants | Overall series | Notes |
|---|---|---|---|---|---|
| 2020 | Tie 1–1 | Cowboys; 37–34 | Giants; 23–19 | Cowboys; 69–47–2 | In Dallas, Cowboys quarterback Dak Prescott suffers a season-ending ankle injury. In New York, Giants eliminated the Cowboys from playoff contention with their win. |
| 2021 | Cowboys 2–0 | Cowboys; 44–20 | Cowboys; 21–6 | Cowboys; 71–47–2 | |
| 2022 | Cowboys 2–0 | Cowboys; 28–20 | Cowboys; 23–16 | Cowboys; 73–47–2 | Game in Dallas was played on Thanksgiving Day and was the most-watched NFL regular-season game on record, with an average of 42 million viewers. |
| 2023 | Cowboys 2–0 | Cowboys; 49–17 | Cowboys; 40–0 | Cowboys; 75–47–2 | |
| 2024 | Cowboys 2–0 | Cowboys; 27–20 | Cowboys; 20–15 | Cowboys; 77–47–2 | Game in Dallas was played on Thanksgiving Day. |
| 2025 | Tie 1–1 | Cowboys; 40–37 (OT) | Giants; 34–17 | Cowboys; 78–48–2 | Game in Dallas featured six lead changes, tying an NFL record. Cowboys kicker Brandon Aubrey kicked a 64-yard field goal as time expired in regulation to send the game into overtime, then made a 46-yard game-winning field goal as time expired in overtime. Cowboys win 9 straight meetings (2021–2025) and 9 straight home meetings (2017–present). |
| 2026 | Giants 1–0 | January 3 | Giants; 28–20 | Cowboys; 78–49–2 | |

Summary of Results

| Season | Season series | at Dallas Cowboys | at New York Giants | Notes |
|---|---|---|---|---|
| Regular season | Cowboys 78–48–2 | Cowboys 43–20–1 | Cowboys 35–28–1 | |
| Postseason | Giants 1–0 | Giants 1–0 | no games | NFC Divisional: 2007 |
| Regular and postseason | Cowboys 78–49–2 | Cowboys 43–21–1 | Cowboys 35–28–1 | Cowboys have a 2–0 record at Yale Bowl in New Haven, Connecticut (1973), (1974), both accounted for as Giants' home games. |

== Individual leaders ==
Note: Sorted by yards, regular season only. Bold denotes active player.

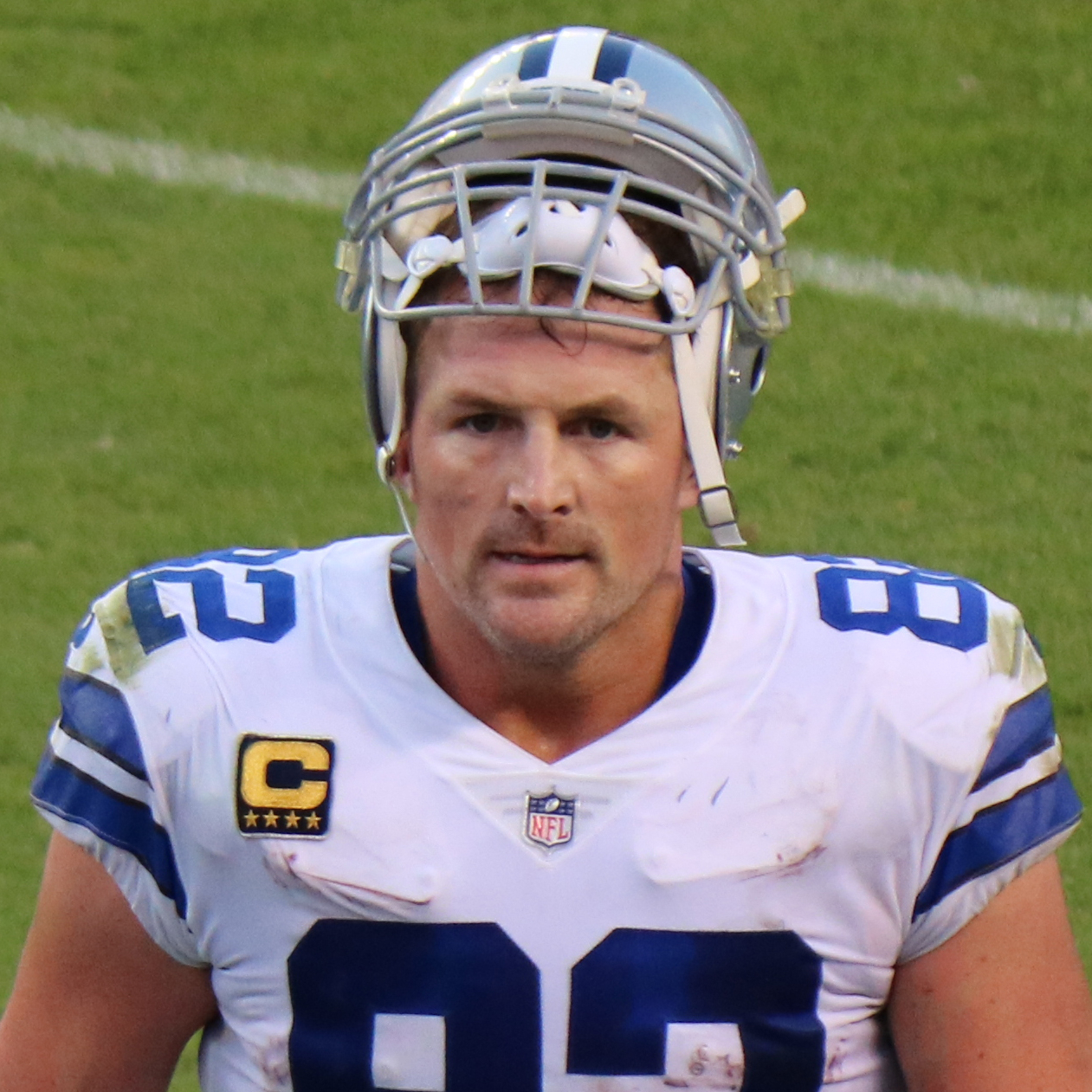
Jason Witten has the most games played, receptions, and receiving yards in this rivalry

=== Passing ===
| Name | Team | GP | W-L | CMP% | Yds | TD | Int |
|---|---|---|---|---|---|---|---|
| Eli Manning | NYG | 30 | 13-17 | 62.6 | 7,560 | 53 | 29 |
| Phil Simms | NYG | 23 | 10-13 | 53.3 | 4,804 | 34 | 29 |
| Tony Romo | DAL | 20 | 11-9 | 67.5 | 4,639 | 41 | 21 |
| **Dak Prescott** | **DAL** | **17** | **14-3** | **66.0** | **4,346** | **31** | **9** |
| Troy Aikman | DAL | 22 | 11-11 | 65.4 | 4,164 | 19 | 17 |

=== Rushing ===
| Name | Team | GP | Att | Yds | TD |
|---|---|---|---|---|---|
| Emmitt Smith | DAL | 24 | 465 | 1,960 | 19 |
| Tony Dorsett | DAL | 20 | 347 | 1,389 | 8 |
| Tiki Barber | NYG | 19 | 288 | 1,304 | 4 |
| Ezekiel Elliott | DAL | 15 | 227 | 1,061 | 10 |
| Don Perkins | DAL | 15 | 222 | 861 | 6 |

=== Receiving ===
| Name | Team | GP | Rec | Yds | TD |
|---|---|---|---|---|---|
| Jason Witten | DAL | 32 | 165 | 1,641 | 16 |
| Bob Hayes | DAL | 17 | 61 | 1,394 | 19 |
| Drew Pearson | DAL | 20 | 68 | 1,129 | 7 |
| Michael Irvin | DAL | 18 | 75 | 1,107 | 4 |
| Amani Toomer | NYG | 23 | 78 | 1,077 | 5 |

== See also ==
- List of NFL rivalries
- NFC East
