= Steelers–Titans rivalry =

National Football League rivalry

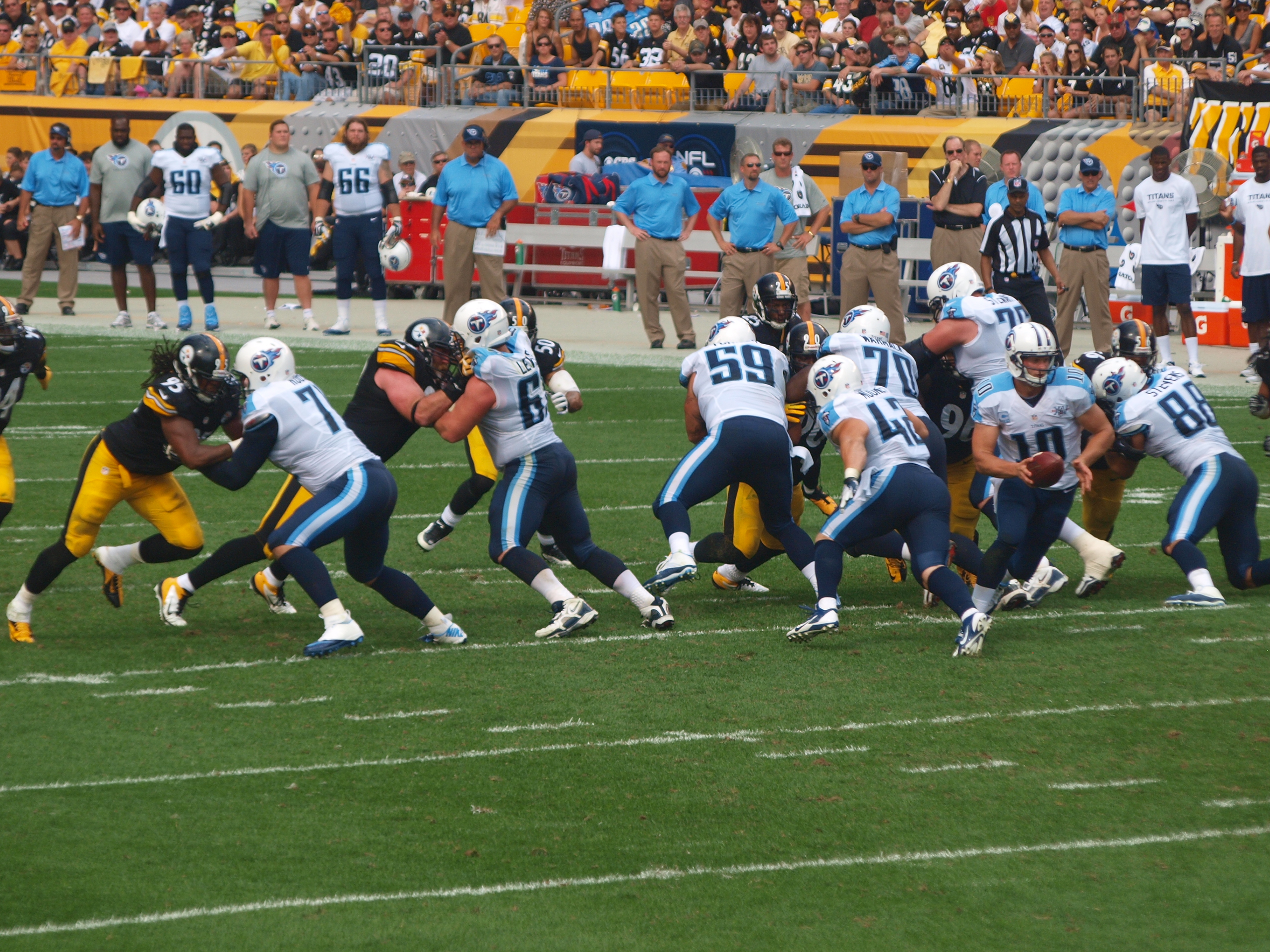
- Steelers and Titans facing off in 2013

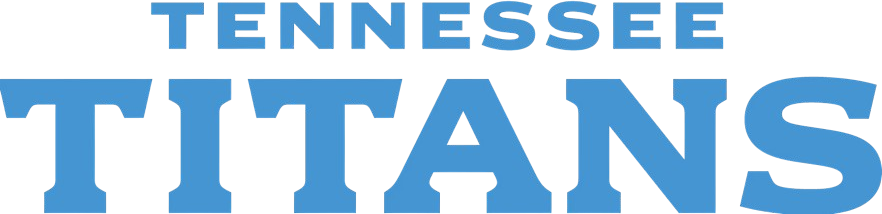
- Pittsburgh Steelers Tennessee Titans
- Location: Pittsburgh, Nashville
- First meeting: September 20, 1970; Oilers 19, Steelers 7
- Latest meeting: November 2, 2023; Steelers 20, Titans 16
- Next meeting: January 3, 2027
- Stadiums: Steelers: Acrisure Stadium; Titans: Nissan Stadium

Statistics
- Total meetings: 81
- All-time series: Steelers: 49–32
- Regular season series: Steelers: 46–31
- Postseason results: Steelers: 3–1
- Largest victory: Steelers: 38–7 (1979); Titans: 27–0 (1989)
- Most points scored: Steelers: 40 (1983), (2017); Titans: 47 (1999)
- Longest win streak: Steelers: 5 (1972–1974, 1994–1996, 2014–present); Titans: 7 (1997–2000)
- Current win streak: Steelers: 5 (2014–present)

Post-season history
- 1978 AFC Championship: Steelers won: 34–5; 1979 AFC Championship: Steelers won: 27–13; 1989 AFC Wild Card: Steelers won: 26–23 (OT); 2002 AFC Divisional: Titans won: 34–31 (OT)

The Steelers–Titans rivalry, formerly known as the Oilers–Steelers rivalry, is a National Football League (NFL) rivalry between the Pittsburgh Steelers and the Tennessee Titans. It dates back to the 1970s, when the Steelers and the then–Houston Oilers met twice annually as members of the AFC Central Division. The two teams were realigned into separate divisions for the 2002 NFL season; however, their matchups are still regarded as intense.

As a result, they do not play each other every year due to them playing in different divisions; instead, they play at least once every three years and at least once every six seasons at each team's home stadium, sometimes more often if the two teams finish in the same place in their respective divisions, or meet in the playoffs.

== History ==
=== Origins ===
When the American Football League (AFL) completed its merger with the National Football League (NFL) in 1970, three NFL teams were offered a $3 million payment to join the former AFL clubs in forming the newly established American Football Conference (AFC). While the Baltimore Colts and Cleveland Browns agreed to the move, the Pittsburgh Steelers were initially hesitant. Steelers owner Art Rooney ultimately agreed to the transition after discussing the matter with his son, Dan Rooney, noting that the financial compensation and the opportunity to preserve the rivalry with the Browns were significant factors.

While the teams that would form the National Football Conference (NFC) struggled to agree on a realignment proposal, the AFC teams quickly found an alignment. The Oilers, who were part of the AFL East before the merger simply because it was further east than the Kansas City Chiefs, were placed in the AFC Central with the Bengals, Browns, and Steelers, being the only team in the division that wasn't in or near Ohio. The Oilers were placed in the division at the insistence of Dan Rooney, much to the chagrin of Al Davis. The Oilers and Steelers became acquainted with each other right away, when the two teams met in the season opener of the 1970 NFL season in Pittsburgh, a 19–7 Oilers victory in the first-ever NFL game at Three Rivers Stadium. The two teams met again four weeks later at the Astrodome in Houston, a 7–3 Steelers victory. The opening season win would be the only time the Oilers would be ahead in the overall series; the series would be tied again in 1971, but since then the Steelers have had the overall series lead, currently at 43–31 in the regular season. At 78 meetings overall, the Oilers/Titans franchise has played the Steelers more than any other team in its history.

=== 1970s ===
The rivalry initially lacked intensity, as the Steelers were emerging as a dominant force in the NFL during the 1970s, while the Oilers struggled significantly. However, the dynamic shifted in the latter part of the decade, when the Oilers developed into a competitive team and began challenging the Steelers for both division and conference supremacy. Unlike rivalries such as that between the Steelers and Browns, which were fueled largely by geographic proximity and fan engagement, the rivalry between the Steelers and the Oilers was characterized by a strong mutual dislike between the teams.

The two teams met in the AFC Championship Game two years in a row at Three Rivers Stadium, with the Steelers dominating the "Luv Ya Blue" Oilers 34–5 in 1978. The Steelers were expecting a closer encounter in the 1979 AFC Championship Game, which was marred by a controversial call in the third quarter when quarterback Dan Pastorini threw a pass to wide receiver Mike Renfro in the end zone. It was ruled incomplete, despite television replays clearly showing Renfro having possession of the ball with both feet in the end zone; even Steelers radio commentator Myron Cope thought it was a touchdown. The Oilers had to settle for a field goal, and the Steelers would go on to win 27–13; the game itself would spark the debate on whether or not the NFL should have instant replay, which would go into effect for the 1986 NFL season.

=== 1980s ===
Both teams hit hard times once the 1980s hit, with the Oilers quickly sinking to the bottom of the division and the Steelers hit with the retirement of several key players from the dynasty years, only remaining competitive due to the AFC Central as a whole being weak during this time. By 1987, the Oilers began to have sustained playoff appearances again under quarterback Warren Moon and controversial coach Jerry Glanville while the Steelers were still rebuilding from their mid-1980s dropoff.

However, the two teams would clinch a wild card spot in the playoffs in 1989, the only year Chuck Noll would win NFL Coach of the Year. During a regular season matchup in Pittsburgh earlier in the year, following the game the usually stoic Noll in post game handshake grabbed Glanville and told him he'd better watch out or he'd get jumped on. This was in reaction to Glanville's earlier comments on how the Oilers field was the 'house of pain' and his prediction that his players would intentionally hurt the Steelers; bounties are now outlawed in the NFL. In the Wild Card round, the Steelers, despite having been swept by the Oilers in the regular season, defeated the Oilers in overtime 26–23. Glanville would be fired from the Oilers after the game.

=== 1990s ===
The Oilers were the class of the division during the early 1990s, winning two division championships, while the Steelers gradually re-emerged as contenders under head coach Bill Cowher. The two would exchange division titles in 1992 and 1993 before the Steelers became the dominant team in the AFC Central due to Oilers owner Bud Adams going through with his threats to blow up the team and rebuild if it didn't go to the Super Bowl.

During this time, both teams were fighting for new stadiums in order to remain competitive. While the Steelers would eventually get one in Heinz Field (although they would've stayed in a refurbished Three Rivers Stadium if the financing plan for Heinz Field fell through), the Oilers couldn't get a new stadium built in Houston and announced they were moving to Nashville for the 1998 NFL season. The Steelers (along with the Bengals) were one of six teams to vote against the proposal out of respect to Houston fans due to the rivalry as well as having recently encountered similar issues with the Browns. The Oilers ended up moving to Tennessee for the 1997 season instead due to lame duck status in Houston; Houston would receive a new NFL team in 2002 when the Houston Texans started play.

Due to the size of Vanderbilt Stadium in Nashville (only 41,000 seats), the now-Tennessee Oilers decided to play at the Liberty Bowl Memorial Stadium in Memphis as an interim home until what would become LP Field was ready to open in 1999. Ironically, most of the crowds in Memphis were more than small enough that Vanderbilt Stadium would've been able to accommodate them. Despite that, the Oilers were planning on playing there again for 1998. That changed after the final game of the season, when the Oilers faced the Steelers in front of 50,677 fans—the only crowd that could not have been reasonably accommodated at Vanderbilt. However, Steeler fans made up the great majority of the crowd (at least three-fourths, by one estimate), despite the fact that it was a meaningless game for both teams (the Steelers already clinched the AFC Central and a first-round bye in the playoffs, Oilers were already eliminated from the playoffs) and the Steelers were resting several starters. The Oilers won 16–6 against mostly Steelers backup players. Adams was so embarrassed that he abandoned plans to play the 1998 season in Memphis and ended up moving to Vanderbilt after all. Adams would rename the team the Titans in 1999 when Adelphia Coliseum (now LP Field) opened.

In their final season as divisional rivals, the Steelers and Titans met on October 29 in Pittsburgh. The Steelers crushed the Titans 34–7, capitalizing on four turnovers and scoring 27 unanswered points.

=== Since realignment ===
The NFL realigned its teams for the 2002 season, placing the Titans in the new AFC South while the Steelers remained in the now-renamed AFC North. Although the two teams wanted to remain together in the same division, they were not able to because the Titans' vote was controlled by the NFL since it recently relocated while the Steelers (along with the Bengals) were required to remain in the same division with the Browns as a result of the NFL's settlement with the city of Cleveland in 1996. Additionally, there was some sentiment to keep the Ravens in the same division as the Steelers, although at least one realignment proposal did have the Titans in the AFC North. Despite that, the Steelers and Titans have still played each other rather frequently, having only not played each other four times. Despite no longer being divisional rivals, players from both the Titans and Steelers have not forgotten the intensity of their past matchups.

The Steelers and Titans first met as non-divisional opponents in the 2002 season on November 17. Entering the game, both teams were in first place in their respective divisions. The Titans would win 31–23. However, controversy arose after the game when Steelers linebacker Joey Porter accused Titans strength and conditioning coach Steve Watterson of throwing coffee on him following a tackle on Titans quarterback Steve McNair. Watterson later claimed it was soup, not coffee, and that the incident was accidental. Additionally, Steelers quarterback Tommy Maddox suffered a temporary paralysis after a hit by Titans linebacker Keith Bulluck and was rushed to the hospital for evaluation.

The two teams later met in the playoffs, with the Titans serving as the home team for the first time in the history of the rivalry. The game was closely contested and went back and forth before heading into overtime. In overtime, Titans kicker Joe Nedney kicked the game-winning 26-yard field goal to secure a 34–31 victory for Tennessee.

Perhaps the most notable matchup since realignment came in 2008, when the two met in Nashville in a game that determined home-field advantage in the AFC playoffs and a possible preview of the AFC Championship Game. LenDale White and Keith Bulluck stepped on a Terrible Towel after the Titans' 31–14 victory. Pittsburgh's Larry Foote responded, "They deserved to do that, they whooped us, they deserve to celebrate and, hopefully, we'll see them again," while Hines Ward said, "T. J. Houshmandzadeh did kind of the same thing and you see where they went." Former Steelers head coach Bill Cowher, by this point working for CBS as an analyst on The NFL Today, mentioned on The NFL Today (while clearly showing bias in favor of his former team) that such antics can come back to haunt teams. Tennessee proceeded to lose eight consecutive games, including their playoff game against the Ravens and their 2009 Week 1 game against the Steelers, capped off by a 59–0 blowout to the New England Patriots, the Titans' worst loss ever.

The Steelers edged the Titans 13–10 to open the 2009 season and won again 38–17 in 2010. In 2012, Matt Hasselbeck led the Titans to a close 26–23 win, and in 2013, Jake Locker led a 16–9 win over the Steelers. On January 13, 2014, the Titans hired former Steelers' tight end coach Ken Whisenhunt as their new head coach.

The two teams met on November 16, 2017 at Heinz Field, in primetime on NBC and NFL Network. The game, part of the NFL Color Rush and the Steelers first color-on-color game since World War II, was won by Pittsburgh, 40–17.

The two teams met on October 25, 2020, in Nashville, with both clubs entering with identical 5–0 records. During a game rescheduled from its previous start date due to a COVID-19 outbreak within the Titans organization, Pittsburgh jumped to a 24–7 halftime lead before Tennessee rallied in the second half. The game was decided when Titans kicker Stephen Gostkowski missed a potential game-tying field goal at the end of regulation, allowing the Steelers to win 27–24 and attain its first 6–0 start since 1978.

== Season-by-season results ==
Pittsburgh Steelers vs. Houston Oilers/Tennessee Oilers/Titans Season-by-Season Results
1970s (Steelers, 16–6)

Season	Season series	at Pittsburgh Steelers	at Houston Oilers	Overall series	Notes
1970	Tie 1–1	Oilers; 19–7	Steelers; 7–3	Tie; 1–1	The game in Pittsburgh was the first meeting between the two, and the first regular-season game at Three Rivers Stadium. This marks the only time the Oilers/Titans franchise has held the overall series lead in the history of the rivalry.
1971	Tie 1–1	Steelers; 23–16	Oilers; 29–3	Tie; 2–2	
1972	Steelers 2–0	Steelers; 24–7	Steelers; 9–3	Steelers; 4–2	
1973	Steelers 2–0	Steelers; 33–7	Steelers; 36–7	Steelers; 6–2	
1974	Tie 1–1	Oilers; 13–10	Steelers; 13–7	Steelers; 7–3	Steelers win Super Bowl IX. The Oilers' win was the Steelers' last loss of the season.
1975	Steelers 2–0	Steelers; 24–17	Steelers; 32–9	Steelers; 9–3	Steelers win Super Bowl X.
1976	Steelers 2–0	Steelers; 32–16	Steelers; 21–0	Steelers; 11–3	
1977	Tie 1–1	Steelers; 27–10	Oilers; 27–10	Steelers; 12–4	
1978	Tie 1–1	Oilers; 24–17	Steelers; 13–3	Steelers; 13–5	Oilers' win handed the Steelers their first loss of the season after a 7–0 start and would also be their only home loss that season. Following the loss, the Steelers went on a 18-game home winning streak.
1978 playoffs	Steelers 1–0	Steelers; 34–5	—N/a	Steelers; 14–5	AFC Championship Game. Steelers win Super Bowl XIII.
1979	Tie 1–1	Steelers; 38–7	Oilers; 20–17	Steelers; 15–6	—N/a
1979 playoffs	Steelers 1–0	Steelers; 27–13	—N/a	Steelers; 16–6	AFC Championship Game. The game was marked by controversy over the Mike Renfro no-touchdown call. Steelers win Super Bowl XIV.

1980s (Steelers, 12–8)

Season	Season series	at Pittsburgh Steelers	at Houston Oilers	Overall series	Notes
1980	Tie 1–1	Steelers; 31–17	Oilers; 6–0	Steelers; 17–7	Oilers' first shutout win in the series.
1981	Tie 1–1	Steelers; 26–13	Oilers; 21–20	Steelers; 18–8	
1982	Steelers 1–0	no game	Steelers; 24–10	Steelers; 19–8	Game in Pittsburgh canceled due to 1982 strike. Game in Houston was the first game following the 1982 strike.
1983	Steelers 2–0	Steelers; 17–10	Steelers; 40–28	Steelers; 21–8	
1984	Tie 1–1	Steelers; 35–7	Oilers; 23–20 (OT)	Steelers; 22–9	First overtime game in the rivalry in the game in Houston.
1985	Steelers 2–0	Steelers; 20–0	Steelers; 30–7	Steelers; 24–9	
1986	Steelers 2–0	Steelers; 21–10	Steelers; 22–16 (OT)	Steelers; 26–9	Steelers win 9 straight home meetings (1978–1986).
1987	Oilers 2–0	Oilers; 23–3	Oilers; 24–16	Steelers; 26–11	Game in Pittsburgh was the first win for Warren Moon in the series. Oilers record their first season series sweep against the Steelers.
1988	Tie 1–1	Oilers; 34–14	Steelers; 37–34	Steelers; 27–12	Steelers' lone road victory in 1988, as well as their only win in division play.
1989	Oilers 2–0	Oilers; 23–16	Oilers; 27–0	Steelers; 27–14	
1989 playoffs	Steelers 1–0	—N/a	Steelers; 26–23 (OT)	Steelers; 28–14	AFC Wild Card playoffs. Final game as Oilers coach for Jerry Glanville. Final postseason meeting as division rivals.

1990s (Tie, 10–10)

Season	Season series	at Pittsburgh Steelers	at Houston/Tennessee Oilers/Titans	Overall series	Notes
1990	Tie 1–1	Steelers; 20–9	Oilers; 34–14	Steelers; 29–15	
1991	Tie 1–1	Steelers; 26–14	Oilers; 31–6	Steelers; 30–16	
1992	Steelers 2–0	Steelers; 21–20	Steelers; 29–24	Steelers; 32–16	Bill Cowher's first game as Steelers head coach.
1993	Oilers 2–0	Oilers; 26–17	Oilers; 23–3	Steelers; 32–18	
1994	Steelers 2–0	Steelers; 30–14	Steelers; 12–9 (OT)	Steelers; 34–18	
1995	Steelers 2–0	Steelers; 21–7	Steelers; 34–17	Steelers; 36–18	Steelers lose Super Bowl XXX.
1996	Tie 1–1	Steelers; 30–16	Oilers; 23–13	Steelers; 37–19	Oilers' home game is the final game in the rivalry to be held in Houston
1997	Tie 1–1	Steelers; 37–24	Oilers; 16–6	Steelers; 38–20	The Oilers' home game is the only matchup between the two teams in Liberty Bowl Memorial Stadium.
1998	Oilers 2–0	Oilers; 41–31	Oilers; 23–14	Steelers; 38–22	The Oilers' home game is the only meeting between the two to date at Vanderbilt Stadium.
1999	Titans 2–0	Titans; 47–36	Titans; 16–10	Steelers; 38–24	The Oilers change their nickname to "Titans." The meeting in Tennessee is the first meeting at Nissan Stadium (previously named Adelphia Coliseum). Titans lose Super Bowl XXXIV.

2000s (Titans, 6–4)

Season	Results	Location	Overall series	Notes
2000	Titans; 23–20	Three Rivers Stadium	Steelers; 38–26	Final meeting between the two teams at Three Rivers Stadium. Steve McNair returned after injury two weeks earlier.
2000	Titans; 9–7	Adelphia Coliseum	Steelers; 38–26	
2001	Steelers; 34–7	Heinz Field	Steelers; 40–26	First meeting at Heinz Field.
2001	Steelers; 34–24	Adelphia Coliseum	Steelers; 40–26	Final meeting as division rivals. Titans moved to the new AFC South for the 2002 season while the Steelers remain in the AFC Central, renamed the AFC North.
2002	Titans; 31–23	Adelphia Coliseum	Steelers; 40–27	Tommy Maddox was knocked out with temporary paralysis and had to sit out several games in the ensuing weeks; he returned late in the season.
2002 playoffs	Titans; 34–31 (OT)	Adelphia Coliseum	Steelers; 40–28	AFC Divisional playoffs – Final postseason meeting to date. The only postseason meeting with the Titans is located in Tennessee.
2003	Titans; 30–13	Heinz Field	Steelers; 40–29	
2005	Steelers; 34–7	Heinz Field	Steelers; 41–29	Steelers win Super Bowl XL.
2008	Titans; 31–14	LP Field	Steelers; 41–30	Titans' Keith Bulluck and LenDale White stomped on a Terrible Towel late in the game after clinching victory and home-field advantage in the AFC playoffs. This would mark the Steelers' last loss before winning Super Bowl XLIII, while the Titans went winless until Week 7 of the 2009 season, with many Titans fans believing the losing streak began due to the so-called "Terrible Curse".
2009	Steelers; 13–10 (OT)	Heinz Field	Steelers; 42–30	NFL Kickoff game.

2010s (Steelers, 4–2)

Season	Results	Location	Overall series	Notes
2010	Steelers; 19–11	LP Field	Steelers; 43–30	Steelers lose Super Bowl XLV.
2011	Steelers; 38–17	Heinz Field	Steelers; 44–30	Ben Roethlisberger ties Steeler record with 5 touchdown passes.
2012	Titans; 26–23	LP Field	Steelers; 44–31	
2013	Titans; 16–9	Heinz Field	Steelers; 44–32	The quickest points scored in NFL history occurred (Titans accidentally commit a safety with 14:59 on the clock in the first quarter).
2014	Steelers; 27–24	LP Field	Steelers; 45–32	At a kickoff temperature of 25 °F (−4 °C), the game is the coldest to be held at LP Field.
2017	Steelers; 40–17	Heinz Field	Steelers; 46–32	

2020s (Steelers, 3–0)

Season	Results	Location	Overall series	Notes
2020	Steelers; 27–24	Nissan Stadium	Steelers; 47–32	Sixth game since the 1973 season with two teams entering with 5–0 or better records (all previous winners eventually reaching the Super Bowl). The Steelers' best start since 1978. The game was rescheduled due to a COVID-19 outbreak within the Titans organization.
2021	Steelers; 19–13	Heinz Field	Steelers; 48–32	Final start in the series for Ben Roethlisberger.
2023	Steelers; 20–16	Acrisure Stadium	Steelers; 49–32	
2026	January 3	Nissan Stadium	Steelers; 49–32	

Summary of Results

Season	Season series	at Pittsburgh Steelers	at Houston/Tennessee Oilers/Titans	Notes
Regular season	Steelers 46–31	Steelers 27–12	Tie 19–19	
Postseason	Steelers 3–1	Steelers 2–0	Tie 1–1	AFC Wild Card: 1989; AFC Divisional: 2002; AFC Championship: 1978, 1979
Regular and postseason	Steelers 49–32	Steelers 29–12	Tie 20–20	
