= Patriots–Steelers rivalry =

American football rivalry

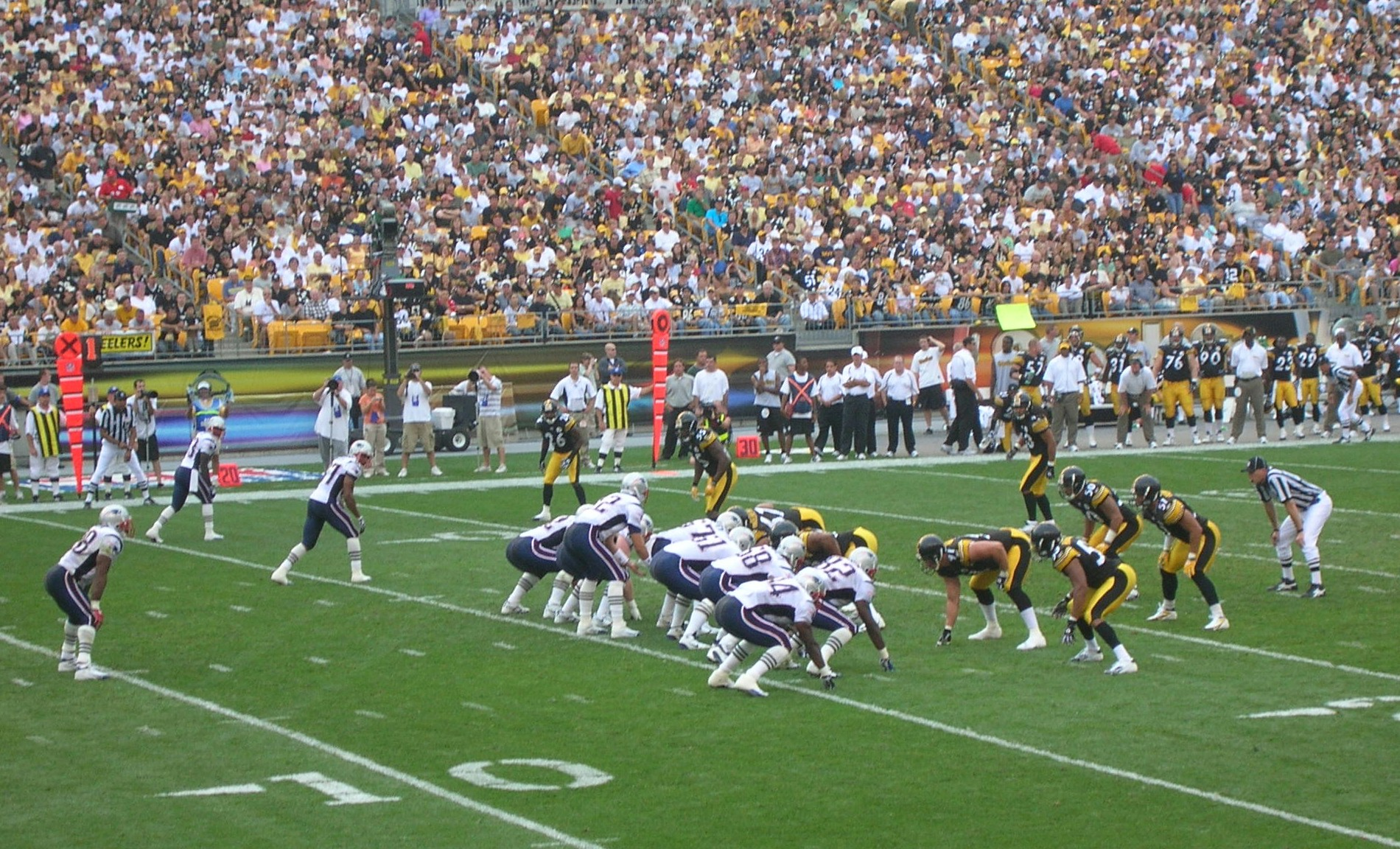
- Patriots and Steelers facing off in 2005

- New England Patriots Pittsburgh Steelers
- Location: Boston, Pittsburgh
- First meeting: October 22, 1972; Steelers 33, Patriots 3
- Latest meeting: September 20, 2026; Patriots 20, Steelers 3
- Next meeting: TBD
- Stadiums: Patriots: Gillette Stadium; Steelers: Acrisure Stadium

Statistics
- Total meetings: 37
- All-time series: Patriots: 20–17
- Regular season series: Tied: 16–16
- Postseason results: Patriots: 4–1
- Largest victory: Patriots: 34–0 (1986); Steelers: 33–3 (1972)
- Most points scored: Patriots: 55 (2013); Steelers: 41 (1995)
- Longest win streak: Patriots: 5 (2013–2017); Steelers: 5 (1989–1995)
- Current win streak: Patriots: 1 (2025–present)

Post-season history
- 1996 AFC Divisional: Patriots won: 28–3; 1997 AFC Divisional: Steelers won: 7–6; 2001 AFC Championship: Patriots won: 24–17; 2004 AFC Championship: Patriots won: 41–27; 2016 AFC Championship: Patriots won: 36–17

The Patriots–Steelers rivalry is a National Football League (NFL) rivalry between the New England Patriots and the Pittsburgh Steelers. The Patriots and Steelers are the two most storied franchises in the Super Bowl era, the Patriots and Steelers have played each other intermittently since the 1970s, but the two teams did not become full-fledged rivals until the late 1990s, when they became Super Bowl contenders. The rivalry would reach new heights during the 2000s and 2010s when both teams, led by quarterbacks Tom Brady and Ben Roethlisberger for the Patriots and Steelers respectively, posted winning seasons and several playoff appearances during this time period with both teams making it to the Super Bowl and taking home more than one Vince Lombardi Trophy. The two met each other in three AFC championship games during the 2000s and 2010s in which the Patriots defeated the Steelers each time and eventually made their way to the Super Bowl, winning a title in each appearance. Despite the Patriots' dominant reign over the NFL from 2001 to 2019, the Steelers would still prove themselves to be a consistent playoff contender during that time period with three Super Bowl appearances and two Super Bowl victories. However, the Steelers would be more successful in the postseason during the 2000s than in the 2010s. In 2020, CBS Sports ranked the Patriots–Steelers rivalry as the 8th best NFL rivalry of the 2000s.

Because they play in different intraconference divisions, the Patriots in the AFC East and the Steelers in the AFC North, they do not play each other every season. Instead, based on the NFL's scheduling formula, the two teams play each other at least once every three seasons and at least once every six seasons at each team's home stadium when their divisions are paired up, sometimes more often if the two teams meet in the playoffs or they finish in the same place in their respective divisions.

== History ==
The Steelers initially dominated the rivalry, winning 10 of its first 13 meetings with the Patriots. But in the 1996 AFC Divisional Round, the Patriots routed the Steelers 28–3 at Foxboro Stadium, ending Pittsburgh's five-game winning streak against New England. It also began a stretch where the Patriots won 14 of the next 20 meetings with the Steelers, including four of five postseason matchups. The Patriots would go on to reach and then lose Super Bowl XXXI against the Green Bay Packers. The following year, also in the divisional round, the Steelers exacted revenge at Three Rivers Stadium, winning by a 7–6 score to reach their third AFC championship game in four years. This was also the only playoff meeting in which the winner did not eventually advance to the Super Bowl, as the Steelers lost to the eventual champion Denver Broncos in the AFC championship game. Earlier that season, the Steelers overcame a 14–0 deficit to beat the Patriots on the road 24–21 in overtime. In that game, quarterback Kordell Stewart managed a game-tying drive late in the fourth quarter culminating in a touchdown to Mark Bruener and a two-point conversion to Yancey Thigpen. In overtime, placekicker Norm Johnson won the game with a 31-yard field goal. The win gave the Steelers a first-round bye and ensured a home game in the divisional round.

In the 2001 season, the Steelers finished with the top seed in the AFC at 13–3. Meanwhile, the Patriots overcame an early-season injury to Drew Bledsoe, and led by then-second year quarterback Tom Brady and coached by Bill Belichick, rallied to finish second at 11–5. The two teams met in the AFC championship game at Heinz Field, and with Bledsoe replacing Brady due to injury, the Patriots upset the Steelers 24–17 and went on to win their first Super Bowl.

The 2004 season saw the emergence of Ben Roethlisberger as the Steelers' starting quarterback. En route to a 15–1 season, Roethlisberger and the Steelers ended the Patriots' record 21-game winning streak on October 31, taking home a 34–20 victory. The Steelers entered the AFC championship game having won all 15 games Roethlisberger started in his rookie season. However, the streak ended at home as New England defeated Pittsburgh 41–27 en route to winning their third Super Bowl championship. The defeat also prevented the Steelers from facing their in-state rival Philadelphia Eagles, who had clinched the NFC championship.

The Patriots and Steelers would not meet in the postseason again until 2016. Between those playoff meetings, the Steelers made three Super Bowl appearances and won two (Super Bowl XL and XLIII), while the Patriots also made three Super Bowls but won only once (Super Bowl XLIX). Facing each other at Gillette Stadium in the AFC championship game, the Patriots again routed the Steelers 36–17 and went on to win their fifth Super Bowl. In 2018, the Steelers would upset the Patriots 17–10 fueled by 142 rushing performance by rookie Jaylen Samuels. Soon after, New England would recover from the loss en route to a sixth Super Bowl title, tying the Steelers with the most Super Bowl championships.

In 2025, the Steelers defeated the Patriots 21–14, led by a defensive performance that included five turnovers. This marked Patriots quarterback Drake Maye's first starting game in the rivalry.

== Season–by–season results ==
New England Patriots vs. Pittsburgh Steelers Season-by-Season Results
1970s (Steelers, 3–1)

Season	Results	Location	Overall series	Notes
1972	Steelers; 33–3	Three Rivers Stadium	Steelers; 1–0	First meeting in the series. Most lopsided Steelers win in the series.
1974	Steelers; 21–17	Schaefer Stadium	Steelers; 2–0	Steelers win Super Bowl IX.
1976	Patriots; 30–27	Three Rivers Stadium	Steelers; 2–1	
1979	Steelers; 16–13(OT)	Schaefer Stadium	Steelers; 3–1	Steelers win Super Bowl XIV.

1980s (Steelers, 3–2)

Season	Results	Location	Overall series	Notes
1981	Steelers; 27–21(OT)	Three Rivers Stadium	Steelers; 4–1	
1982	Steelers; 37–14	Three Rivers Stadium	Steelers; 5–1	
1983	Patriots; 28–23	Three Rivers Stadium	Steelers; 5–2	
1986	Patriots; 34–0	Three Rivers Stadium	Steelers; 5–3	Most lopsided Patriots win in the series. Also the largest margin of victory in the series.
1989	Steelers; 28–10	Three Rivers Stadium	Steelers; 6–3	

1990s (Steelers, 6–2)

Season	Results	Location	Overall series	Notes
1990	Steelers; 24–3	Three Rivers Stadium	Steelers; 7–3	
1991	Steelers; 20–6	Three Rivers Stadium	Steelers; 8–3	Final game for Chuck Noll in this series.
1993	Steelers; 17–14	Three Rivers Stadium	Steelers; 9–3	
1995	Steelers; 41–27	Three Rivers Stadium	Steelers; 10–3	Steelers lose Super Bowl XXX.
1996 playoffs	Patriots 28–3	Foxboro Stadium	Steelers 10–4	AFC Divisional Round. First postseason meeting in the series. Patriots host first playoff game since 1978. Largest margin of victory in a playoff game in the series. This was the only Patriots' home victory over the Steelers prior to the Tom Brady era. Patriots lose Super Bowl XXXI.
1997	Steelers; 24–21(OT)	Foxboro Stadium	Steelers; 11–4	Final meeting at Foxboro Stadium.
1997 playoffs	Steelers 7–6	Three Rivers Stadium	Steelers 12–4	AFC Divisional Round. Kordell Stewart's 40-yard touchdown run in the first quarter proved to be the winning score. Most recent NFL playoff game in which neither team scored at least 10 points.
1998	Patriots; 23–9	Three Rivers Stadium	Steelers; 12–5	Final meeting at Three Rivers Stadium.

2000s (Patriots, 5–2)

Season	Results	Location	Overall series	Notes
2001 playoffs	Patriots 24–17	Heinz Field	Steelers 12–6	AFC Championship Game. First meeting at Heinz Field. First start in the series for Tom Brady. Later replaced by Drew Bledsoe due to injury. Patriots win Super Bowl XXXVI.
2002	Patriots; 30–14	Gillette Stadium	Steelers; 12–7	First meeting at Gillette Stadium.
2004	Steelers; 34–20	Heinz Field	Steelers; 13–7	First start in the series for Ben Roethlisberger. Steelers end Patriots' record 21-game winning streak.
2004 playoffs	Patriots 41–27	Heinz Field	Steelers 13–8	AFC Championship Game. Patriots win ended the Steelers 15-game winning streak. Patriots win Super Bowl XXXIX.
2005	Patriots; 23–20	Heinz Field	Steelers; 13–9	Steelers win Super Bowl XL.
2007	Patriots; 34–13	Gillette Stadium	Steelers; 13–10	Patriots complete 16–0 regular season. Patriots lose Super Bowl XLII.
2008	Steelers; 33–10	Gillette Stadium	Steelers; 14–10	Steelers' first win at Gillette Stadium. Steelers win Super Bowl XLIII.

2010s (Patriots, 7–2)

Season	Results	Location	Overall series	Notes
2010	Patriots; 39–26	Heinz Field	Steelers; 14–11	Steelers lose Super Bowl XLV.
2011	Steelers; 25–17	Heinz Field	Steelers; 15–11	Patriots lose Super Bowl XLVI.
2013	Patriots; 55–31	Gillette Stadium	Steelers; 15–12	Highest scoring game in the series.
2015	Patriots; 28–21	Gillette Stadium	Steelers; 15–13	NFL Kickoff Game.
2016	Patriots; 27–16	Heinz Field	Steelers; 15–14	
2016 playoffs	Patriots 36–17	Gillette Stadium	Tied 15–15	AFC Championship Game. Last postseason meeting to date. Patriots surpass the Steelers for most Super Bowl appearances. Patriots win Super Bowl LI.
2017	Patriots; 27–24	Heinz Field	Patriots; 16–15	Patriots take first lead in the series. In the closing seconds, Jesse James of the Steelers appeared to have scored a go-ahead touchdown that would have clinched the AFC's #1 seed, but after review, the call was overturned ruling that Jesse James didn't maintain control of the ball. Two plays later, Duron Harmon's interception of Ben Roethlisberger sealed the win for the Patriots, who would instead finish as the AFC's #1 seed. Patriots lose Super Bowl LII.
2018	Steelers; 17–10	Heinz Field	Tied; 16–16	Following their loss, the Patriots went on a 13-game winning streak. Patriots win Super Bowl LIII, tying with the Steelers for the most Super Bowl wins at six.
2019	Patriots; 33–3	Gillette Stadium	Patriots; 17–16	Final starts in the series for Tom Brady and Ben Roethlisberger.

2020s (Patriots, 3–1)

Season	Results	Location	Overall series	Notes
2022	Patriots; 17–14	Acrisure Stadium	Patriots; 18–16	
2023	Patriots; 21–18	Acrisure Stadium	Patriots; 19–16	Final game for Bill Belichick in this series.
2025	Steelers; 21–14	Gillette Stadium	Patriots; 19–17	Steelers' second win at Gillette Stadium, their first since 2008. Patriots lose Super Bowl LX.
2026	Patriots; 20–3	Gillette Stadium	Patriots; 20–17	

Summary of Results

Season	Season series	at New England Patriots	at Pittsburgh Steelers	Notes
Regular season	Tied 16–16	Patriots 6–5	Steelers 11–10	
Postseason	Patriots 4–1	Patriots 2–0	Patriots 2–1	AFC Divisional: 1996, 1997; AFC Championship: 2001, 2004, 2016
Regular and postseason	Patriots 20–17	Patriots 8–5	Tie 12–12	

== See also ==
- National Football League rivalries
