= 2025 New England Patriots season =

66th season in franchise history, 6th Super Bowl loss

- Owner: Robert Kraft
- General manager: Eliot Wolf (de facto)
- Head coach: Mike Vrabel
- Offensive coordinator: Josh McDaniels
- Defensive coordinator: Terrell Williams (Note: During the season, inside linebackers coach Zak Kuhr took over the role after Williams was diagnosed with prostate cancer and stepped away from the team to undergo treatment.)
- Home stadium: Gillette Stadium

Results
- Record: 14–3
- Division place: 1st AFC East
- Playoffs: Won Wild Card Playoffs (vs. Chargers) 16–3; Won Divisional Playoffs (vs. Texans) 28–16; Won AFC Championship (at Broncos) 10–7; Lost Super Bowl LX (vs. Seahawks) 13–29
- All-Pros: QB Drake Maye (2nd team); PR Marcus Jones (2nd team)
- Pro Bowlers: Selected but did not play due to participation in Super Bowl LX: QB Drake Maye; CB Christian Gonzalez

Uniform
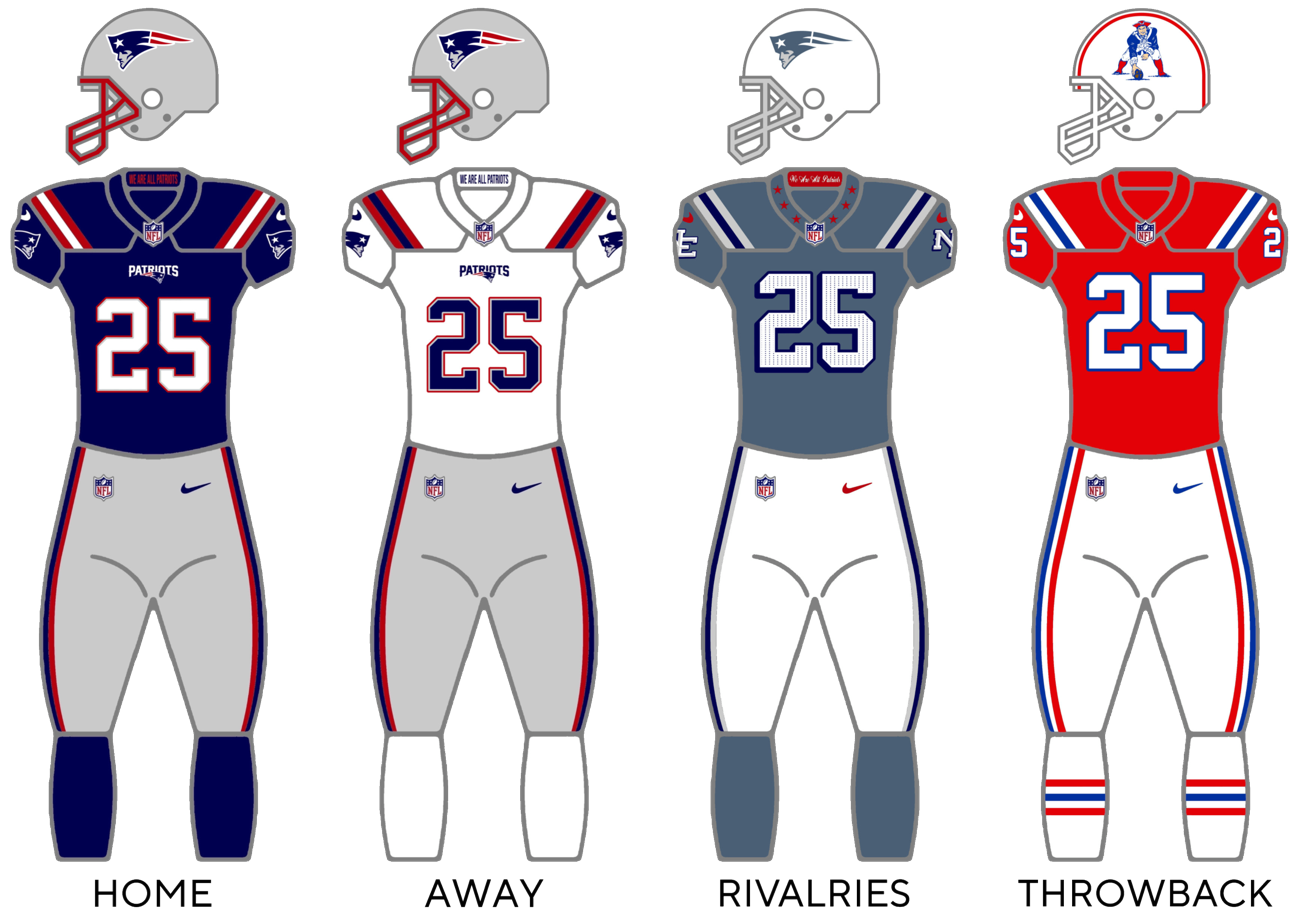

The 2025 season was the New England Patriots' 56th in the National Football League (NFL), their 66th overall, their second under de facto general manager Eliot Wolf, their first under head coach Mike Vrabel, and their 12th Super Bowl appearance. The Patriots clinched their first winning season since 2021 with a Week 11 victory over the division rival New York Jets, and guaranteed they would exceed their combined win total for the 2023 and 2024 seasons. With a Week 16 victory over the Baltimore Ravens, the Patriots made the playoffs for the first time since 2021 under Bill Belichick. Their Week 17 victory over the Jets, combined with a Bills loss that same week, gave the Patriots their first AFC East championship since 2019 and their first division championship without Tom Brady or Bill Belichick since 1997. Their Week 18 victory over the Miami Dolphins tied them for the largest single-season turnaround in NFL history, at 10 games. The Patriots earned the No. 2 seed in the AFC; the Denver Broncos, who also finished 14–3, earned the No. 1 seed based on the common opponents tiebreaker.

This season began with the Patriots' third head coach in as many seasons following the dismissal of first-year head coach Jerod Mayo after the final game of the 2024 season. Patriots Hall of Fame inductee Mike Vrabel, who played for the team from 2001 to 2008, was hired as the franchise's 16th head coach on January 12. Before coaching New England, Vrabel was head coach of the Tennessee Titans from 2018 to 2023.

With the retirement of center David Andrews and the release of long snapper Joe Cardona, linebacker Ja'Whaun Bentley, defensive end Deatrich Wise, cornerback Jonathan Jones, and quarterback Jacoby Brissett, this was the team's first season since 1992 that their roster had no players who won, or would go on to win, a Super Bowl with them.

Their .824 winning percentage was their best since their Super Bowl LI-winning 2016 season, making them the first NFL team since the 1999 Indianapolis Colts to suffer two consecutive seasons with 13 losses and win 13 or more games in the third. This is also their first season with 10 consecutive wins since 2015, and their first with both a 4,000 yard passer and 1,000 yard receiver since 2019. In addition, the 2025 Patriots had the second easiest schedule since league realignment in 2002; its historically low strength of schedule was .391 and the team played only three regular-season games against opponents that finished with winning records. These were the Pittsburgh Steelers once and Buffalo Bills twice. They became the first team in NFL history to finish 9–0 on the road.

For their efforts this season, Mike Vrabel and Josh McDaniels received NFL Coach of the Year and NFL Assistant Coach of the Year, respectively. Vrabel became the first Patriots head coach to receive the award since Bill Belichick in 2010. It was his second time winning the award, with the first being in 2021 with the Tennessee Titans. Meanwhile, McDaniels became the first Patriots assistant coach to receive the award since its introduction in 2014. Quarterback Drake Maye was also runner-up for NFL Most Valuable Player, falling behind to Los Angeles Rams quarterback Matthew Stafford by a singular vote.

In the postseason, the Patriots faced the Los Angeles Chargers in the Wild Card Round, winning with a score of 16–3. It would be their first playoff victory since Super Bowl LIII. The following week, they went up against the Houston Texans in the Divisional Round, winning with a 28–16 score. Following that, the Patriots traveled to Denver for the AFC Championship, defeating the Broncos with a score of 10–7. It would be their first postseason victory both on the road and in the conference championship since 2018. The Patriots became the first team in NFL history to defeat three top-five ranked defenses in a single postseason. They are also the first team in NFL history to reach the Super Bowl after losing 13 or more games the previous season. In Super Bowl LX, they faced the Seahawks in a rematch of Super Bowl XLIX. It was their 12th Super Bowl appearance, extending an NFL record. The Patriots were defeated by the Seahawks by a final score of 29–13, failing to win their seventh Super Bowl title. They then became the first NFL franchise to lose in six Super Bowls, breaking a tie they previously shared with the Denver Broncos.

== Roster changes ==
=== Free agency ===
==== Unrestricted ====
| Position | Player | 2025 team | Date signed | Contract |
|---|---|---|---|---|
| QB | Jacoby Brissett | Arizona Cardinals | March 14, 2025 | 2 years, $12.5 million |
| G | Lester Cotton | | | |
| DT | Daniel Ekuale | Pittsburgh Steelers | March 19, 2025 | 1 year, $2.8 million |
| RB | JaMycal Hasty | New England Patriots | August 5, 2025 | 1 year, $1.17 million |
| S | Jaylinn Hawkins | New England Patriots | March 13, 2025 | 1 year, $1.8 million |
| TE | Austin Hooper | New England Patriots | March 14, 2025 | 1 year, $5 million |
| CB | Jonathan Jones | Washington Commanders | March 14, 2025 | 1 year, $5.5 million |
| K | Joey Slye | Tennessee Titans | March 24, 2025 | 1 year, $1.295 million |
| DE | Deatrich Wise Jr. | Washington Commanders | March 19, 2025 | 1 year, $3.25 million |
| LB | Oshane Ximines | | | |

==== Restricted ====
| Position | Player | 2025 team | Date signed | Contract |
|---|---|---|---|---|
| LB | Christian Elliss | New England Patriots | March 25, 2025 | 2 years, $13.508 million |

==== Exclusive Rights ====
| Position | Player | 2025 team | Date signed | Contract |
|---|---|---|---|---|
| CB | Alex Austin | New England Patriots | TBC | 1 year, $1.03 million |
| C | Ben Brown | New England Patriots | TBC | 1 year, $1.03 million |
| OT | Demontrey Jacobs | New England Patriots | TBC | 1 year, $960,000 |
| DT | Jeremiah Pharms Jr. | New England Patriots | TBC | 2 years, $2.475 million |

==== Signings/waiver claims ====
| Position | Player | Previous team | Date signed | Contract |
|---|---|---|---|---|
| OLB | Harold Landry | Tennessee Titans | March 12, 2025 | 3 years, $43.5 million |
| CB | Carlton Davis | Detroit Lions | March 13, 2025 | 3 years, $54 million |
| OT | Morgan Moses | New York Jets | March 13, 2025 | 3 years, $24 million |
| ILB | Robert Spillane | Las Vegas Raiders | March 13, 2025 | 3 years, $33 million |
| DT | Milton Williams | Philadelphia Eagles | March 13, 2025 | 4 years, $104 million |
| S | Marcus Epps | Las Vegas Raiders | March 14, 2025 | 1 year, $2.025 million |
| WR | Mack Hollins | Buffalo Bills | March 14, 2025 | 2 years, $8.4 million |
| NT | Khyiris Tonga | Arizona Cardinals | March 14, 2025 | 1 year, $2.1 million |
| OLB | K'Lavon Chaisson | Las Vegas Raiders | March 17, 2025 | 1 year, $3.0 million |
| G | Wes Schweitzer | New York Jets | March 17, 2025 | 1 year, $1.55 million |
| QB | Joshua Dobbs | San Francisco 49ers | March 18, 2025 | 2 years, $8.0 million |
| C | Garrett Bradbury | Minnesota Vikings | March 19, 2025 | 2 years, $9.5 million |
| LB | Jack Gibbens | Tennessee Titans | March 19, 2025 | 1 year, $1.3 million |
| WR | Stefon Diggs | Houston Texans | March 28, 2025 | 3 years, $63.5 million |
| DT | Isaiah Iton | Tennessee Titans | May 12, 2025 | 1 year, $840,000 |
| RB | Trayveon Williams | Cincinnati Bengals | May 14, 2025 | 1 year, $1.17 million |
| OT | Yasir Durant | DC Defenders | June 24, 2025 | 1 year, $1.03 million |
| DT | David Olajiga | Los Angeles Rams | July 20, 2025 | 1 year, $840,000 |
| TE | Tyler Davis | Green Bay Packers | July 30, 2025 | 1 year, $1.1 million |
| TE | Cole Fotheringham | Denver Broncos | July 30, 2025 | 1 year, $840,000 |
| C | Alec Lindstrom | Memphis Showboats | July 30, 2025 | 1 year, $960,000 |
| CB | Tre Avery | San Francisco 49ers | August 5, 2025 | 1 year, $1.1 million |
| RB | Deneric Prince | Memphis Showboats | August 10, 2025 | 1 year, $960,000 |
| NT | Kyle Peko | Detroit Lions | August 11, 2025 | 1 year, $1.255 million |
| QB | Tommy DeVito | New York Giants | August 27, 2025 | 1 year, $1.03 million |
| CB | Charles Woods | Los Angeles Rams | August 27, 2025 | 1 year, $960,000 |

=== Releases/waivers ===
| Position | Player | Date released/waived |
|---|---|---|
| LB | Sione Takitaki | February 19, 2025 |
| C | David Andrews | March 13, 2025 |
| LB | Curtis Jacobs | March 21, 2025 |
| OT | Caleb Jones | March 21, 2025 |
| LB | Andrew Parker Jr. | March 21, 2025 |
| C | Lecitus Smith | March 21, 2025 |
| LB | Ja'Whaun Bentley | March 28, 2025 |
| C | Jake Andrews | April 28, 2025 |
| DT | Marcus Harris | April 28, 2025 |
| WR | JaQuae Jackson | April 28, 2025 |
| LB | Titus Leo | April 28, 2025 |
| S | Mark Perry | April 28, 2025 |
| TE | Giovanni Ricci | April 28, 2025 |
| LS | Joe Cardona | April 29, 2025 |
| OT | Cole Birdow | May 12, 2025 |
| DT | Eric Johnson II | May 14, 2025 |
| DT | Wilfried Pene | June 26, 2025 |
| WR | Demeer Blankumsee | July 30, 2025 |
| OT | Yasir Durant | July 30, 2025 |
| RB | Trayveon Williams | July 30, 2025 |
| TE | Tyler Davis | August 5, 2025 |
| S | Josh Minkins | August 10, 2025 |
| DT | Bryce Ganious | August 11, 2025 |
| RB | Deneric Prince | August 12, 2025 |
| DT | Isaiah Iton | August 18, 2025 |
| CB | Tre Avery | August 19, 2025 |
| DE | Jereme Robinson | August 19, 2025 |
| TE | Jaheim Bell | August 22, 2025 |
| RB | Micah Bernard | August 22, 2025 |
| DT | Philip Blidi | August 22, 2025 |
| CB | Isaiah Bolden | August 22, 2025 |
| TE | Cole Fotheringham | August 22, 2025 |
| WR | Phil Lutz | August 22, 2025 |
| LB | R.J. Moten | August 22, 2025 |
| DT | Kyle Peko | August 22, 2025 |
| CB | Jordan Polk | August 22, 2025 |
| LB | Monty Rice | August 22, 2025 |
| OG | Tyrese Robinson | August 22, 2025 |
| OG | Sidy Sow | August 22, 2025 |
| RB | Shane Watts | August 22, 2025 |
| QB | Ben Wooldridge | August 22, 2025 |
| OG | Layden Robinson | August 24, 2025 |
| CB | Miles Battle | August 26, 2025 |
| OG | Mehki Butler | August 26, 2025 |
| OG | Jack Conley | August 26, 2025 |
| CB | Brandon Crossley | August 26, 2025 |
| TE | CJ Dippre | August 26, 2025 |
| S | Marcus Epps | August 26, 2025 |
| RB | JaMycal Hasty | August 26, 2025 |
| OT | Demontrey Jacobs | August 26, 2025 |
| RB | Terrell Jennings | August 26, 2025 |
| WR | John Jiles | August 26, 2025 |
| DE | Truman Jones | August 26, 2025 |
| C | Alec Lindstrom | August 26, 2025 |
| CB | Kobee Minor | August 26, 2025 |
| DT | David Olajiga | August 26, 2025 |
| LB | Cam Riley | August 26, 2025 |
| DT | Jahvaree Ritzie | August 26, 2025 |
| K | John Parker Romo | August 26, 2025 |
| TE | Gee Scott Jr. | August 26, 2025 |
| OG | Cole Strange | August 26, 2025 |
| LB | Bradyn Swinson | August 26, 2025 |
| WR | Jeremiah Webb | August 26, 2025 |
| WR | Javon Baker | August 27, 2025 |
| WR | Kendrick Bourne | August 27, 2025 |
| S | Jabrill Peppers | August 29, 2025 |
| C | Brenden Jaimes | December 29, 2025 |
| CB | Miles Battle | December 29, 2025 |
| DT | Jeremiah Pharms Jr. | January 3, 2026 |
| RB | D'Ernest Johnson | January 12, 2026 |

=== Retirements ===
| Position | Player | Date released/waived |
|---|---|---|
| G | Wes Schweitzer | June 10, 2025 |

=== Trades ===
- March 12 – Defensive tackle Davon Godchaux was traded to the New Orleans Saints in exchange for a 2026 seventh-round selection.
- April 3 – Quarterback Joe Milton III and a 2025 seventh-round selection (217th overall) were traded to the Dallas Cowboys in exchange for a 2025 fifth-round selection (171st overall).
- September 13 – Wide receiver Ja'Lynn Polk and a 2028 seventh-round selection were traded to the New Orleans Saints in exchange for a 2027 sixth-round pick.
- October 29 – Defensive end Keion White and a 2026 seventh-round selection were traded to the San Francisco 49ers in exchange for a 2026 sixth-round pick.
- October 30 – Safety Kyle Dugger and a 2026 seventh-round selection were traded to the Pittsburgh Steelers in exchange for a 2026 sixth-round pick.

== Draft ==
2025 New England Patriots draft selections
| Round | Selection | Player | Position | College | Notes |
|---|---|---|---|---|---|
| 1 | 4 | Will Campbell | OT | LSU | |
| 2 | 38 | TreVeyon Henderson | RB | Ohio State | |
| 3 | 69 | Kyle Williams | WR | Washington State | |
| 3 | 95 | Jared Wilson | C | Georgia | From Chiefs (Note: The Patriots traded a third-round selection (85th overall) to the Kansas City Chiefs in exchange for a third-round selection (95th overall) and a 2026 fourth-round selection.) |
| 4 | 106 | Craig Woodson | S | California | |
| 4 | 137 | Joshua Farmer | DT | Florida State | From Seahawks (Note: The Patriots traded fifth- and seventh-round selections (144th and 238th overall) to the Seattle Seahawks in exchange for a fourth-round selection (137th overall).) |
| 5 | 146 | Bradyn Swinson | DE | LSU | From Carolina (Note: The Patriots traded a third-round selection (77th overall) to the Carolina Panthers in exchange for third- and fifth-round selections (85th and 146th overall).) |
| 6 | 182 | Andrés Borregales | K | Miami | From Jaguars via Lions (Note: The Patriots traded a fifth-round selection (171st overall) to the Detroit Lions in exchange for sixth- and seventh-round selections (182nd and 228th overall).) |
| 7 | 220 | Marcus Bryant | OT | Missouri | |
| 7 | 251 | Julian Ashby | LS | Vanderbilt | From Chiefs (Note: The Patriots traded a seventh-round selection (228th overall) to the Kansas City Chiefs in exchange for two seventh-round selections (251st and 257th overall).) |
| 7 | 257 | Kobee Minor | CB | Memphis | From Chiefs |

2025 New England Patriots undrafted free agents
| Name | Position | College | Ref. |
|---|---|---|---|
| Cole Birdow | OT | Merrimack | |
| Demeer Blankumsee | WR | Memphis | |
| Efton Chism | WR | Eastern Washington | |
| Jack Conley | OG | Boston College | |
| Brandon Crossley | CB | SMU | |
| CJ Dippre | TE | Alabama | |
| Brock Lampe | FB | Northern Illinois | |
| Lan Larison | RB | UC Davis | |
| Josh Minkins | S | Cincinnati | |
| Jordan Polk | CB | Texas State | |
| Elijah Ponder | LB | Cal Poly | |
| Cam Riley | LB | Florida State | |
| Jahvaree Ritzie | DT | North Carolina | |
| Gee Scott Jr. | TE | Ohio State | |
| Jeremiah Webb | WR | South Alabama | |
| Ben Wooldridge | QB | Louisiana | |
| Mehki Butler | OG | Arkansas State | |
| Wilfried Pene | DT | Virginia Tech | |
| R.J. Moten | LB | Florida | |
| Bryce Ganious | DT | Wake Forest | |
| Jereme Robinson | DE | Kansas | |
| Shane Watts | RB | Fort Hays State | |
| Phil Lutz | WR | Delaware | |
| Micah Bernard | RB | Utah | |
| Philip Blidi | DT | Auburn | |

Draft trades

== Staff ==
2025 New England Patriots staff
| Front office: Chairman/CEO – Robert Kraft; President – Jonathan Kraft; Executive vice president of player personnel – Eliot Wolf; Vice president of player personnel – Ryan Cowden; Vice president of football administration – Matt Groh; Assistant director of pro personnel – Sam Fioroni; Director of pro scouting – AJ Highsmith; Director of college scouting – Tony Kinkela; Assistant director of college scouting – Matt Evans; Director of scouting administration – Nancy Meier; Vice president of football operations and strategy – John Streicher; Director of scouting projects – Marshall Oium; Director of coaching analytics – Ekene Olekanma; Director of player development – James Mitchell; Personnel coordinator – Brian Smith; Senior personnel executive – Alonzo Highsmith; Director of Research – Richard Miller; Director of football operations – Bobby Brown; Head coaches: Head coach – Mike Vrabel; Offensive coaches: Offensive coordinator – Josh McDaniels; Quarterbacks – Ashton Grant; Running backs – Tony Dews; Wide receivers – Todd Downing; Tight ends/passing game coordinator – Thomas Brown; Offensive line – Doug Marrone; Assistant offensive line – Jason Houghtaling; Assistant offensive line – Robert Kugler; Offensive assistant – Chuckie Keeton; Offensive assistant – Riley Larkin | Defensive coaches: Defensive coordinator – Terrell Williams; Defensive line – Clint McMillan; Inside linebackers – Zak Kuhr; Outside linebackers – Mike Smith; Cornerbacks – Justin Hamilton; Safeties – Scott Booker; Senior defensive assistant – Ben McAdoo; Defensive assistant – Vinny DePalma; Defensive assistant – Milton Patterson; Defensive assistant – Kevin Richardson; Special teams coaches: Special teams coordinator – Jeremy Springer; Assistant special teams – Tom Quinn; Strength and conditioning: Director of sports performance – Frank Piraino; Strength and conditioning – Deron Mayo; Assistant strength and conditioning – Brian McDonough |

== Final roster ==
2025 New England Patriots roster
| Quarterbacks (QB): 16 Tommy DeVito; 11 Joshua Dobbs; 10 Drake Maye; Running backs (RB): 32 TreVeyon Henderson; 38 Rhamondre Stevenson; 37 Jack Westover FB; Wide receivers (WR): 9 Kayshon Boutte; 86 Efton Chism; 8 Stefon Diggs; 3 DeMario Douglas; 13 Mack Hollins; 18 Kyle Williams; Tight ends (TE): 82 CJ Dippre; 85 Hunter Henry; 81 Austin Hooper | Offensive linemen (OL): 65 Garrett Bradbury C; 77 Ben Brown LG; 52 Marcus Bryant RT; 66 Will Campbell LT; 59 Vederian Lowe LT; 74 Thayer Munford RT; 76 Morgan Moses RT; 71 Mike Onwenu RG; 70 Caedan Wallace RG; 58 Jared Wilson LG; Defensive linemen (DL): 90 Christian Barmore DT; 94 Cory Durden NT; 95 Khyiris Tonga NT; 97 Milton Williams DT | Linebackers (LB): 44 K'Lavon Chaisson OLB; 53 Christian Elliss MLB; 51 Jack Gibbens MLB; 33 Anfernee Jennings OLB; 2 Harold Landry OLB; 15 Marte Mapu MLB; 49 Chad Muma MLB; 91 Elijah Ponder OLB; 14 Robert Spillane MLB; 43 Bradyn Swinson OLB; 48 Jahlani Tavai MLB; Defensive backs (DB): 28 Alex Austin CB; 7 Carlton Davis CB; 0 Christian Gonzalez CB; 21 Jaylinn Hawkins FS; 25 Marcus Jones CB; 19 Kobee Minor CB; 24 Dell Pettus SS; 41 Brenden Schooler FS; 22 Charles Woods CB; 31 Craig Woodson SS; Special teams (ST): 47 Julian Ashby LS; 17 Bryce Baringer P; 36 Andrés Borregales K | Practice squad: 35 Miles Battle CB; 63 Mehki Butler G; 99 Amari Gainer MLB; 39 Richie Grant S; 42 Darius Harris MLB (PS/I); 61 Brenden Jaimes C; 83 John Jiles WR; 34 D'Ernest Johnson RB; 45 Patrick Johnson OLB; 84 Marshall Lang TE; 72 Lorenz Metz LT (IPP); 88 Thomas Odukoya TE (IPP) (PS/I); 98 Jeremiah Pharms Jr. DT; 54 Otis Reese MLB; 49 Craig Reynolds RB (PS/I); 67 Andrew Rupcich G; 23 John Saunders Jr. FS; 80 Trent Sherfield WR; 93 Leonard Taylor III DT; 29 Jeremiah Webb WR; Reserve: 27 Marcellas Dial CB (IR); 72 Yasir Durant LT (IR); 92 Joshua Farmer DE (IR/DFR); 4 Antonio Gibson RB (IR); 55 Eric Gregory NT (IR); 68 Isaiah Iton DE (IR); 26 Terrell Jennings RB (IR); 46 Brock Lampe FB (IR); 34 Lan Larison RB (IR); 30 Deneric Prince RB (IR); 94 Jaquelin Roy DT (IR); Rookies in italics 53 active, 11 reserve, 17 practice squad (3 exempt) |

== Preseason ==
On August 8, prior to the team's first preseason game, the statue of Tom Brady was unveiled outside of Gillette Stadium, with Tom Brady in attendance.

| Week | Date | Opponent | Result | Record | Venue | Recap |
|---|---|---|---|---|---|---|
| 1 | August 8 | Washington Commanders | W 48–18 | 1–0 | Gillette Stadium | Recap |
| 2 | August 16 | at Minnesota Vikings | W 20–12 | 2–0 | U.S. Bank Stadium | Recap |
| 3 | August 21 | at New York Giants | L 10–42 | 2–1 | MetLife Stadium | Recap |

== Regular season ==
=== Schedule ===
| Week | Date | Opponent | Result | Record | Venue | Recap |
|---|---|---|---|---|---|---|
| 1 | September 7 | Las Vegas Raiders | **L** 13–20 | 0–1 | Gillette Stadium | Recap |
| 2 | September 14 | at **Miami Dolphins** | **W** 33–27 | 1–1 | Hard Rock Stadium | Recap |
| 3 | September 21 | Pittsburgh Steelers | **L** 14–21 | 1–2 | Gillette Stadium | Recap |
| 4 | September 28 | Carolina Panthers | **W** 42–13 | 2–2 | Gillette Stadium | Recap |
| 5 | October 5 | at **Buffalo Bills** | **W** 23–20 | 3–2 | Highmark Stadium | Recap |
| 6 | October 12 | at New Orleans Saints | **W** 25–19 | 4–2 | Caesars Superdome | Recap |
| 7 | October 19 | at Tennessee Titans | **W** 31–13 | 5–2 | Nissan Stadium | Recap |
| 8 | October 26 | Cleveland Browns | **W** 32–13 | 6–2 | Gillette Stadium | Recap |
| 9 | November 2 | Atlanta Falcons | **W** 24–23 | 7–2 | Gillette Stadium | Recap |
| 10 | November 9 | at Tampa Bay Buccaneers | **W** 28–23 | 8–2 | Raymond James Stadium | Recap |
| 11 | November 13 | **New York Jets** | **W** 27–14 | 9–2 | Gillette Stadium | Recap |
| 12 | November 23 | at Cincinnati Bengals | **W** 26–20 | 10–2 | Paycor Stadium | Recap |
| 13 | December 1 | New York Giants | **W** 33–15 | 11–2 | Gillette Stadium | Recap |
| 14 | Bye | | | | | |
| 15 | December 14 | **Buffalo Bills** | **L** 31–35 | 11–3 | Gillette Stadium | Recap |
| 16 | December 21 | at Baltimore Ravens | **W** 28–24 | 12–3 | M&T Bank Stadium | Recap |
| 17 | December 28 | at **New York Jets** | **W** 42–10 | 13–3 | MetLife Stadium | Recap |
| 18 | January 4 | **Miami Dolphins** | **W** 38–10 | 14–3 | Gillette Stadium | Recap |

Note: Intra-division opponents are in bold text.

=== Game summaries ===
==== Week 1: vs. Las Vegas Raiders ====
Week 1: Las Vegas Raiders at New England Patriots – Game summary

| Quarter | 1 | 2 | 3 | 4 | Total |
|---|---|---|---|---|---|
| **Raiders** | 7 | 0 | 10 | 3 | **20** |
| Patriots | 7 | 3 | 0 | 3 | **13** |

at Gillette Stadium, Foxborough, Massachusetts

- Date: September 7
- Game time: 1:00 p.m. EDT
- Game weather: Rain, 64 °F (18 °C)
- Game attendance: 64,628
- Referee: Ron Torbert
- TV announcers (CBS): Spero Dedes, Adam Archuleta and Aditi Kinkhabwala
- Recap, Game Book

Game information

**First quarter**

- LV – Tre Tucker 26-yard pass from Geno Smith (Daniel Carlson kick), 12:17. Raiders 7–0. **Drive: 6 plays, 66 yards, 2:43.**
- NE – Demario Douglas 2-yard pass from Drake Maye (Andrés Borregales kick), 1:02. Tied 7–7. **Drive: 12 plays, 82 yards, 5:20.**

**Second quarter**

- NE – Andrés Borregales 35-yard field goal, 1:57. Patriots 10–7. **Drive: 9 plays, 56 yards, 5:45.**

**Third quarter**

- LV – Ashton Jeanty 3-yard run (Daniel Carlson kick), 9:39. Raiders 14–10. **Drive: 5 plays, 71 yards, 2:35.**
- LV – Daniel Carlson 51-yard field goal, 0:52. Raiders 17–10. **Drive: 6 plays, 52 yards, 3:35.**

**Fourth quarter**

- LV – Daniel Carlson 40-yard field goal, 6:46. Raiders 20–10. **Drive: 12 plays, 66 yards, 6:47.**
- NE – Andrés Borregales 44-yard field goal, 0:19. Raiders 20–13. **Drive: 10 plays, 54 yards, 1:29.**

**Top passers**

- LV – Geno Smith – 24/34, 362 yards, TD, INT
- NE – Drake Maye – 30/46, 287 yards, TD, INT

**Top rushers**

- LV – Ashton Jeanty – 19 rushes, 38 yards, TD
- NE – TreVeyon Henderson – 5 rushes, 27 yards

**Top receivers**

- LV – Brock Bowers – 5 receptions, 103 yards
- NE – Kayshon Boutte – 6 receptions, 103 yards

This was the Patriots' first home loss to the Raiders since 1994, and fifth consecutive season losing their home opener. This was the third time they lost to the Raiders since 2022.

==== Week 2: at Miami Dolphins ====
Week 2: New England Patriots at Miami Dolphins – Game summary

| Quarter | 1 | 2 | 3 | 4 | Total |
|---|---|---|---|---|---|
| **Patriots** | 12 | 3 | 8 | 10 | **33** |
| Dolphins | 0 | 14 | 6 | 7 | **27** |

at Hard Rock Stadium, Miami Gardens, Florida

- Date: September 14
- Game time: 1:00 p.m. EDT
- Game weather: Partly cloudy, 89 °F (32 °C)
- Game attendance: 64,593
- Referee: Alex Moore
- TV announcers (CBS): Andrew Catalon, Charles Davis, Jason McCourty and AJ Ross
- Recap, Game Book

Game information

**First quarter**

- NE – Mack Hollins 8-yard pass from Drake Maye (kick failed), 9:29. Patriots 6–0. **Drive: 10 plays, 68 yards, 5:31.**
- NE – Kayshon Boutte 16-yard pass from Drake Maye (kick failed), 0:49. Patriots 12–0. **Drive: 11 plays, 70 yards, 7:05.**

**Second quarter**

- MIA – Jaylen Waddle 18-yard pass from Tua Tagovailoa (Riley Patterson kick), 11:19. Patriots 12–7. **Drive: 8 plays, 83 yards, 4:30.**
- NE – Andrés Borregales 22-yard field goal, 1:56. Patriots 15–7. **Drive: 15 plays, 71 yards, 9:23.**
- MIA – De'Von Achane 29-yard pass from Tua Tagovailoa (Riley Patterson kick), 0:33. Patriots 15–14. **Drive: 6 plays, 77 yards, 1:23.**

**Third quarter**

- MIA – Riley Patterson 40-yard field goal, 10:41. Dolphins 17–15. **Drive: 7 plays, 49 yards, 4:19.**
- MIA – Riley Patterson 44-yard field goal, 3:37. Dolphins 20–15. **Drive: 9 plays, 30 yards, 5:36.**
- NE – Drake Maye 6-yard run (Rhamondre Stevenson run), 0:06. Patriots 23–20. **Drive: 5 plays, 83 yards, 3:31.**

**Fourth quarter**

- MIA – Malik Washington 74-yard punt return (Riley Patterson kick), 7:18. Dolphins 27–23.
- NE – Antonio Gibson 90-yard kickoff return (Andrés Borregales kick), 7:06. Patriots 30–27.
- NE – Andrés Borregales 53-yard field goal, 1:47. Patriots 33–27. **Drive: 4 plays, 3 yards, 0:25.**

**Top passers**

- NE – Drake Maye – 19/23, 230 yards, 2 TD
- MIA – Tua Tagovailoa – 26/32, 315 yards, 2 TD, INT

**Top rushers**

- NE – Rhamondre Stevenson – 11 rushes, 54 yards
- MIA – De'Von Achane – 11 rushes, 30 yards

**Top receivers**

- NE – Rhamondre Stevenson – 5 receptions, 88 yards
- MIA – Tyreek Hill – 6 receptions, 109 yards

With their first win in Miami since 2019 (first overall since 2022) the Patriots improved to 1–1 and they got their first win over Dolphins quarterback Tua Tagovailoa (previously 0–7). It was also the first time the Patriots scored more than 30 points since Week 6 of the 2022 season.

==== Week 3: vs. Pittsburgh Steelers ====
Week 3: Pittsburgh Steelers at New England Patriots – Game summary

| Quarter | 1 | 2 | 3 | 4 | Total |
|---|---|---|---|---|---|
| **Steelers** | 7 | 7 | 0 | 7 | **21** |
| Patriots | 0 | 7 | 0 | 7 | **14** |

at Gillette Stadium, Foxborough, Massachusetts

- Date: September 21
- Game time: 1:00 p.m. EDT
- Game weather: Cloudy, 66 °F (19 °C)
- Game attendance: 64,628
- Referee: Clete Blakeman
- TV announcers (CBS): Ian Eagle, J. J. Watt and Evan Washburn
- Recap, Game Book

Game information

**First quarter**

- PIT – Kenneth Gainwell 1-yard run (Chris Boswell kick), 8:25. Steelers 7–0. **Drive: 8 plays, 54 yards, 4:53.**

**Second quarter**

- PIT – DK Metcalf 12-yard pass from Aaron Rodgers (Chris Boswell kick), 13:49. Steelers 14–0. **Drive: 12 plays, 90 yards, 6:23.**
- NE – Hunter Henry 5-yard pass from Drake Maye (Andrés Borregales kick), 9:01. Steelers 14–7. **Drive: 9 plays, 77 yards, 4:48.**

**Third quarter**

- No scoring plays

**Fourth quarter**

- NE – Hunter Henry 16-yard pass from Drake Maye (Andrés Borregales kick), 14:56. Tied 14–14. **Drive: 15 plays, 88 yards, 8:44.**
- PIT – Calvin Austin III 17-yard pass from Aaron Rodgers (Chris Boswell kick), 2:16. Steelers 21–14. **Drive: 9 plays, 62 yards, 5:25.**

**Top passers**

- PIT – Aaron Rodgers – 16/23, 139 yards, 2 TD, INT
- NE – Drake Maye – 28/37, 268 yards, 2 TD, INT

**Top rushers**

- PIT – Jaylen Warren – 18 rushes, 47 yards
- NE – Drake Maye – 7 rushes, 45 yards

**Top receivers**

- PIT – Calvin Austin III – 3 receptions, 34 yards, TD
- NE – Hunter Henry – 8 receptions, 90 yards, 2 TD

The Patriots committed five turnovers in their loss to the Steelers, falling to 1–2 and suffering their first home defeat to Pittsburgh since the 2008 season. In addition, it was New England's first loss to the Steelers since 2018, snapping a three game win streak against them.

==== Week 4: vs. Carolina Panthers ====
Week 4: Carolina Panthers at New England Patriots – Game summary

| Quarter | 1 | 2 | 3 | 4 | Total |
|---|---|---|---|---|---|
| Panthers | 6 | 0 | 0 | 7 | **13** |
| **Patriots** | 7 | 21 | 7 | 7 | **42** |

at Gillette Stadium, Foxborough, Massachusetts

- Date: September 28
- Game time: 1:00 p.m. EDT
- Game weather: Sunny, 76 °F (24 °C)
- Game attendance: 64,628
- Referee: Bill Vinovich
- TV announcers (Fox): Chris Myers, Mark Schlereth and Jen Hale
- Recap, Game Book

Game information

**First quarter**

- CAR – Tommy Tremble 7-yard pass from Bryce Young (kick failed), 10:51. Panthers 6–0. **Drive: 7 plays, 76 yards, 4:09.**
- NE – Marcus Jones 87-yard punt return (Andrés Borregales kick), 5:34. Patriots 7–6.

**Second quarter**

- NE – Drake Maye 5-yard run (Andrés Borregales kick), 14:54. Patriots 14–6. **Drive: 6 plays, 80 yards, 3:02.**
- NE – TreVeyon Henderson 5-yard run (Andrés Borregales kick), 5:48. Patriots 21–6. **Drive: 8 plays, 55 yards, 4:07.**
- NE – Antonio Gibson 1-yard run (Andrés Borregales kick), 1:57. Patriots 28–6. **Drive: 4 plays, 14 yards, 2:05.**

**Third quarter**

- NE – Hunter Henry 31-yard pass from Drake Maye (Andrés Borregales kick), 10:17. Patriots 35–6. **Drive: 8 plays, 78 yards, 4:43.**

**Fourth quarter**

- NE – Mack Hollins 4-yard pass from Drake Maye (Andrés Borregales kick), 14:13. Patriots 42–6. **Drive: 7 plays, 41 yards, 3:10.**
- CAR – Mitchell Evans 2-yard pass from Andy Dalton (Ryan Fitzgerald kick), 1:56. Patriots 42–13. **Drive: 13 plays, 91 yards, 6:45.**

**Top passers**

- CAR – Bryce Young – 18/30, 150 yards, TD
- NE – Drake Maye – 14/17, 203 yards, 2 TD

**Top rushers**

- CAR – Chuba Hubbard – 10 rushes, 49 yards
- NE – Rhamondre Stevenson – 9 rushes, 38 yards

**Top receivers**

- CAR – Tetairoa McMillan – 4 receptions, 62 yards
- NE – Stefon Diggs – 6 receptions, 101 yards

With a convincing win over the Carolina Panthers, which also the most points the team scored since 2021, the Patriots improved to 2–2 on the season while securing their first home win of the season and first win at home against the Panthers since 2009.

==== Week 5: at Buffalo Bills ====
Week 5: New England Patriots at Buffalo Bills – Game summary

| Quarter | 1 | 2 | 3 | 4 | Total |
|---|---|---|---|---|---|
| **Patriots** | 3 | 3 | 7 | 10 | **23** |
| Bills | 0 | 3 | 7 | 10 | **20** |

at Highmark Stadium, Orchard Park, New York

- Date: October 5
- Game time: 8:20 p.m. EDT
- Game weather: Clear, 66 °F (19 °C)
- Game attendance: 70,802
- Referee: Shawn Hochuli
- TV announcers (NBC): Mike Tirico, Cris Collinsworth and Melissa Stark
- Recap, Game Book

Game information

**First quarter**

- NE – Andrés Borregales 30-yard field goal, 0:56. Patriots 3–0. **Drive: 4 plays, −1 yard, 0:48.**

**Second quarter**

- BUF – Matt Prater 31-yard field goal, 9:34. Tied 3–3. **Drive: 11 plays, 54 yards, 6:22.**
- NE – Andrés Borregales 19-yard field goal, 0:00. Patriots 6–3. **Drive: 11 plays, 69 yards, 2:22.**

**Third quarter**

- BUF – Curtis Samuel 6-yard pass from Josh Allen (Matt Prater kick), 9:21. Bills 10–6. **Drive: 10 plays, 71 yards, 5:39.**
- NE – Rhamondre Stevenson 4-yard run (Andrés Borregales kick), 6:34. Patriots 13–10. **Drive: 5 plays, 74 yards, 2:47.**

**Fourth quarter**

- NE – Rhamondre Stevenson 7-yard run (Andrés Borregales kick), 12:10. Patriots 20–10. **Drive: 11 plays, 90 yards, 5:43.**
- BUF – Keon Coleman 2-yard pass from Josh Allen (Matt Prater kick), 7:37. Patriots 20–17. **Drive: 8 plays, 74 yards, 4:33.**
- BUF – Matt Prater 45-yard field goal, 2:17. Tied 20–20. **Drive: 10 plays, 53 yards, 3:35.**
- NE – Andrés Borregales 52-yard field goal, 0:15. Patriots 23–20. **Drive: 7 plays, 37 yards, 2:02.**

**Top passers**

- NE – Drake Maye – 22/30, 273 yards
- BUF – Josh Allen – 22/31, 253 yards, 2 TD, INT

**Top rushers**

- NE – TreVeyon Henderson – 6 rushes, 24 yards
- BUF – Josh Allen – 9 rushes, 53 yards

**Top receivers**

- NE – Stefon Diggs – 10 receptions, 146 yards
- BUF – Dalton Kincaid – 6 receptions, 108 yards

With their final win at Highmark Stadium, the Patriots secured back-to-back wins for the first time since 2022, as well as their second straight win over the Bills who were the last undefeated team in the NFL, to improve to 3–2, their best start through five games since 2019.

Unfortunately for the Patriots, Antonio Gibson would be lost for the season with an ACL tear.

==== Week 6: at New Orleans Saints ====
Week 6: New England Patriots at New Orleans Saints – Game summary

| Quarter | 1 | 2 | 3 | 4 | Total |
|---|---|---|---|---|---|
| **Patriots** | 14 | 8 | 3 | 0 | **25** |
| Saints | 6 | 10 | 0 | 3 | **19** |

at Caesars Superdome, New Orleans, Louisiana

- Date: October 12
- Game time: 1:00 p.m. EDT/12:00 p.m. CDT
- Game weather: None (indoor stadium)
- Game attendance: 70,042
- Referee: Adrian Hill
- TV announcers (CBS): Spero Dedes, Adam Archuleta and Aditi Kinkhabwala
- Recap, Game Book

Game information

**First quarter**

- NO – Blake Grupe 34-yard field goal, 12:50. Saints 3–0. **Drive: 5 plays, 59 yards, 2:10.**
- NE – Demario Douglas 53-yard pass from Drake Maye (Andres Borregales kick), 10:52. Patriots 7–3. **Drive: 4 plays, 65 yards, 1:58.**
- NO – Blake Grupe 48-yard field goal, 5:05. Patriots 7–6. **Drive: 10 plays, 43 yards, 5:47.**
- NE – Kayshon Boutte 25-yard pass from Drake Maye (Andres Borregales kick), 0:33. Patriots 14–6. **Drive: 6 plays, 69 yards, 4:32.**

**Second quarter**

- NO – Taysom Hill 1-yard run (Blake Grupe kick), 9:42. Patriots 14–13. **Drive: 11 plays, 60 yards, 5:51.**
- NO – Blake Grupe 38-yard field goal, 1:51. Saints 16–14. **Drive: 8 plays, 27 yards, 3:59.**
- NE – Kayshon Boutte 29-yard pass from Drake Maye (Drake Maye run), 0:31. Patriots 22–16. **Drive: 7 plays, 73 yards, 1:20.**

**Third quarter**

- NE – Andres Borregales 24-yard field goal, 7:26. Patriots 25–16. **Drive: 12 plays, 50 yards, 7:34.**

**Fourth quarter**

- NO – Blake Grupe 54-yard field goal, 13:41. Patriots 25–19. **Drive: 7 plays, 25 yards, 3:56.**

**Top passers**

- NE – Drake Maye – 18/26, 261 yards, 3 TD
- NO – Spencer Rattler – 20/26, 227 yards

**Top rushers**

- NE – Drake Maye – 9 rushes, 28 yards
- NO – Alvin Kamara – 10 rushes, 31 yards

**Top receivers**

- NE – Kayshon Boutte – 5 receptions, 93 yards, 2 TD
- NO – Chris Olave – 6 receptions, 98 yards

With their first win over New Orleans since 2017, the Patriots secure their first three-game win streak since 2022 to improve to 4–2, matching their win total (4) from each of the preceding two seasons. The Falcons' win over Buffalo on Monday would give New England their first division lead since 2021.

==== Week 7: at Tennessee Titans ====
Week 7: New England Patriots at Tennessee Titans – Game summary

| Quarter | 1 | 2 | 3 | 4 | Total |
|---|---|---|---|---|---|
| **Patriots** | 3 | 14 | 14 | 0 | **31** |
| Titans | 10 | 3 | 0 | 0 | **13** |

at Nissan Stadium, Nashville, Tennessee

- Date: October 19
- Game time: 1:00 p.m. EDT/12:00 p.m. CDT
- Game weather: Cloudy, 60 °F (16 °C)
- Game attendance: 67,410
- Referee: Craig Wrolstad
- TV announcers (CBS): Andrew Catalon, Charles Davis, Jason McCourty and A.J Ross
- Recap, Game Book

Game information

**First quarter**

- TEN – Joey Slye 49-yard field goal, 12:20. Titans 3–0. **Drive: 6 plays, 34 yards, 2:40.**
- NE – Andres Borregales 36-yard field goal, 6:46. Tied 3–3. **Drive: 10 plays, 47 yards, 5:34.**
- TEN – Chimere Dike 38-yard pass from Cam Ward (Joey Slye kick), 5:04. Titans 10–3. **Drive: 3 plays, 59 yards, 1:42.**

**Second quarter**

- NE – Austin Hooper 3-yard pass from Drake Maye (Andres Borregales kick), 5:34. Tied 10–10. **Drive: 11 plays, 93 yards, 6:42.**
- TEN – Joey Slye 50-yard field goal, 1:48. Titans 13–10. **Drive: 8 plays, 32 yards, 3:46.**
- NE – Kayshon Boutte 39-yard pass from Drake Maye (Andres Borregales kick), 0:49. Patriots 17–13. **Drive: 3 plays, 60 yards, 0:59.**

**Third quarter**

- NE – Rhamondre Stevenson 4-yard run (Andres Borregales kick), 7:31. Patriots 24–13. **Drive: 12 plays, 88 yards, 7:29.**
- NE – K'Lavon Chaisson 4-yard fumble recovery (Andres Borregales kick), 7:20. Patriots 31–13.

**Fourth quarter**

- No scoring plays

**Top passers**

- NE – Drake Maye – 21/23, 222 yards, 2 TD
- TEN – Cam Ward – 25/34, 255 yards, TD, INT

**Top rushers**

- NE – Rhamondre Stevenson – 18 rushes, 88 yards, TD
- TEN – Tyjae Spears – 5 rushes, 22 yards

**Top receivers**

- NE – Stefon Diggs – 7 receptions, 69 yards
- TEN – Chimere Dike – 4 receptions, 70 yards, TD

This game was head coach Mike Vrabel's first return to Tennessee since the Titans fired him after the 2023 season. With their first win in Nashville since 2012, the Patriots improved their record to 5–2, surpassing their win totals from both the 2023 and 2024 seasons. Mike Vrabel became the first head coach in Patriots history to win his first four road games.

==== Week 8: vs. Cleveland Browns ====
Week 8: Cleveland Browns at New England Patriots – Game summary

| Quarter | 1 | 2 | 3 | 4 | Total |
|---|---|---|---|---|---|
| Browns | 7 | 0 | 0 | 6 | **13** |
| **Patriots** | 3 | 6 | 21 | 2 | **32** |

at Gillette Stadium, Foxborough, Massachusetts

- Date: October 26
- Game time: 1:00 p.m. EDT
- Game weather: Sunny, 53 °F (12 °C)
- Game attendance: 64,628
- Referee: Alex Moore
- TV announcers (Fox): Chris Myers and Mark Schlereth
- Recap, Game Book

Game information

**First quarter**

- NE – Andres Borregales 36-yard field goal, 8:45. Patriots 3–0. **Drive: 12 plays, 54 yards, 6:15.**
- CLE – Harold Fannin Jr. 18-yard pass from Dillon Gabriel (Andre Szmyt kick), 5:10. Browns 7–3. **Drive: 6 plays, 70 yards, 3:35.**

**Second quarter**

- NE – Andres Borregales 32-yard field goal, 7:41. Browns 7–6. **Drive: 7 plays, 49 yards, 3:41.**
- NE – Andres Borregales 42-yard field goal, 0:00. Patriots 9–7. **Drive: 7 plays, 59 yards, 2:09.**

**Third quarter**

- NE – Hunter Henry 7-yard pass from Drake Maye (Andres Borregales kick), 9:10. Patriots 16–7. **Drive: 7 plays, 77 yards, 4:03.**
- NE – Stefon Diggs 1-yard pass from Drake Maye (Andres Borregales kick), 6:43. Patriots 23–7. **Drive: 3 plays, 6 yards, 0:48.**
- NE – Kayshon Boutte 39-yard pass from Drake Maye (Andres Borregales kick), 0:53. Patriots 30–7. **Drive: 5 plays, 81 yards, 2:49.**

**Fourth quarter**

- CLE – David Njoku 11-yard pass from Dillon Gabriel (pass failed), 9:24. Patriots 30–13. **Drive: 3 plays, 26 yards, 0:53.**
- NE – Penalty on Dillon Gabriel enforced in the end zone for a safety, 4:06. Patriots 32–13.

**Top passers**

- CLE – Dillon Gabriel – 21/35, 156 yards, 2 TD, 2 INT
- NE – Drake Maye – 18/24, 282 yards, 3 TD, INT

**Top rushers**

- CLE – Malachi Corley – 1 rush, 31 yards
- NE – TreVeyon Henderson – 10 rushes, 75 yards

**Top receivers**

- CLE – Harold Fannin Jr. – 6 receptions, 62 yards, TD
- NE – Mack Hollins – 7 receptions, 89 yards

Despite surrendering five sacks to Myles Garrett, the most the team has given up to one player in franchise history, the Patriots were able to defeat the Browns for the 6th time since 2013. With their 7th home victory against Cleveland since 1995, the Patriots secured their 5th straight win to improve to 6–2.

==== Week 9: vs. Atlanta Falcons ====
Week 9: Atlanta Falcons at New England Patriots – Game summary

| Quarter | 1 | 2 | 3 | 4 | Total |
|---|---|---|---|---|---|
| Falcons | 7 | 7 | 0 | 9 | **23** |
| **Patriots** | 7 | 14 | 3 | 0 | **24** |

at Gillette Stadium, Foxborough, Massachusetts

- Date: November 2
- Game time: 1:00 p.m. EST
- Game weather: Sunny, 52 °F (11 °C)
- Game attendance: 64,628
- Referee: Brad Allen
- TV announcers (CBS): Andrew Catalon, Charles Davis, Jason McCourty and A.J Ross
- Recap, Game Book

Game information

**First quarter**

- NE – Demario Douglas 17-yard pass from Drake Maye (Andres Borregales kick), 7:44. Patriots 7–0. **Drive: 10 plays, 75 yards, 5:35.**
- ATL – Drake London 1-yard pass from Michael Penix Jr. (Parker Romo kick), 0:24. Tied 7–7. **Drive: 5 plays, 53 yards, 2:55.**

**Second quarter**

- NE – Terrell Jennings 3-yard run (Andres Borregales kick), 8:52. Patriots 14–7. **Drive: 12 plays, 65 yards, 6:32.**
- NE – Stefon Diggs 11-yard pass from Drake Maye (Andres Borregales kick), 5:11. Patriots 21–7. **Drive: 5 plays, 72 yards, 2:34.**
- ATL – Drake London 2-yard pass from Michael Penix Jr. (Parker Romo kick), 0:12. Patriots 21–14. **Drive: 2 plays, 6 yards, 0:11.**

**Third quarter**

- NE – Andres Borregales 32-yard field goal, 6:26. Patriots 24–14. **Drive: 15 plays, 56 yards, 8:34.**

**Fourth quarter**

- ATL – Parker Romo 38-yard field goal, 14:08. Patriots 24–17. **Drive: 9 plays, 31 yards, 5:29.**
- ATL – Drake London 8-yard pass from Michael Penix Jr. (kick failed), 4:40. Patriots 24–23. **Drive: 12 plays, 85 yards, 5:01.**

**Top passers**

- ATL – Michael Penix Jr. – 22/37, 221 yards, 3 TD
- NE – Drake Maye – 19/29, 259 yards, 2 TD, INT

**Top rushers**

- ATL – Bijan Robinson – 12 rushes, 46 yards
- NE – TreVeyon Henderson – 14 rushes, 55 yards

**Top receivers**

- ATL – Drake London – 9 receptions, 118 yards, 3 TD
- NE – Demario Douglas – 4 receptions, 100 yards, TD

With their 9th victory over Atlanta since 2001, the Patriots improved to 3–0 against the NFC South and tied the Broncos and Colts for the best record in the NFL at 7–2.

==== Week 10: at Tampa Bay Buccaneers ====
Week 10: New England Patriots at Tampa Bay Buccaneers – Game summary

| Quarter | 1 | 2 | 3 | 4 | Total |
|---|---|---|---|---|---|
| **Patriots** | 7 | 7 | 7 | 7 | **28** |
| Buccaneers | 7 | 3 | 6 | 7 | **23** |

at Raymond James Stadium, Tampa, Florida

- Date: November 9
- Game time: 1:00 p.m. EST
- Game weather: Cloudy, 82 °F (28 °C)
- Game attendance: 65,492
- Referee: Alex Kemp
- TV announcers (CBS): Jim Nantz, Tony Romo and Tracy Wolfson
- Recap, Game Book

Game information

**First quarter**

- TB – Emeka Egbuka 21-yard pass from Baker Mayfield (Chase McLaughlin kick), 11:23. Buccaneers 7–0. **Drive: 6 plays, 65 yards, 3:37.**
- NE – Kyle Williams 72-yard pass from Drake Maye (Andres Borregales kick), 0:00. Tied 7–7. **Drive: 1 play, 72 yards, 0:11.**

**Second quarter**

- TB – Chase McLaughlin 36-yard field goal, 7:16. Buccaneers 10–7. **Drive: 8 plays, 57 yards, 4:25.**
- NE – Stefon Diggs 1-yard pass from Drake Maye (Andres Borregales kick), 0:00. Patriots 14–10. **Drive: 14 plays, 78 yards, 7:16.**

**Third quarter**

- NE – TreVeyon Henderson 55-yard run (Andres Borregales kick), 14:12. Patriots 21–10. **Drive: 2 plays, 65 yards, 0:48.**
- TB – Tez Johnson 10-yard pass from Baker Mayfield (run failed), 4:12. Patriots 21–16. **Drive: 11 plays, 92 yards, 5:50.**

**Fourth quarter**

- NE – TreVeyon Henderson 69-yard run (Andres Borregales kick), 1:31. Patriots 28–16. **Drive: 2 plays, 70 yards, 0:16.**
- TB – Tez Johnson 11-yard pass from Baker Mayfield (Chase McLaughlin kick), 0:33. Patriots 28–23. **Drive: 7 plays, 65 yards, 0:58.**

**Top passers**

- NE – Drake Maye – 16/31, 270 yards, 2 TD, INT
- TB – Baker Mayfield – 28/43, 273 yards, 3 TD

**Top rushers**

- NE – TreVeyon Henderson – 14 rushes, 147 yards, 2 TD
- TB – Sean Tucker – 9 rushes, 53 yards

**Top receivers**

- NE – Mack Hollins – 6 receptions, 106 yards
- TB – Emeka Egbuka – 6 receptions, 115 yards, TD

With their seventh straight win, the Patriots improved to 8–2 and swept an NFC division for the first time since sweeping the NFC East in 2019. This was also the first time the Patriots swept the NFC South.

==== Week 11: vs. New York Jets ====
Week 11: New York Jets at New England Patriots – Game summary

| Quarter | 1 | 2 | 3 | 4 | Total |
|---|---|---|---|---|---|
| Jets | 7 | 0 | 7 | 0 | **14** |
| **Patriots** | 0 | 14 | 7 | 6 | **27** |

at Gillette Stadium, Foxborough, Massachusetts

- Date: November 13
- Game time: 8:15 p.m. EST
- Game weather: Clear, 39 °F (4 °C)
- Game attendance: 64,628
- Referee: Alan Eck
- TV announcers (Prime Video): Al Michaels, Kirk Herbstreit and Kaylee Hartung
- Recap, Game Book

Game information

**First quarter**

- NYJ – Justin Fields 5-yard run (Nick Folk kick), 6:56. Jets 7–0. **Drive: 14 plays, 72 yards, 8:04.**

**Second quarter**

- NE – TreVeyon Henderson 7-yard run (Andres Borregales kick), 14:17. Tied 7–7. **Drive: 13 plays, 69 yards, 7:40.**
- NE – TreVeyon Henderson 7-yard run (Andres Borregales kick), 7:54. Patriots 14–7. **Drive: 8 plays, 83 yards, 4:49.**

**Third quarter**

- NE – TreVeyon Henderson 6-yard pass from Drake Maye (Andres Borregales kick), 7:46. Patriots 21–7. **Drive: 6 plays, 69 yards, 3:30.**
- NYJ – John Metchie III 22-yard pass from Justin Fields (Nick Folk kick), 3:10. Patriots 21–14. **Drive: 9 plays, 65 yards, 4:36.**

**Fourth quarter**

- NE – Andres Borregales 44-yard field goal, 12:06. Patriots 24–14. **Drive: 10 plays, 46 yards, 6:04.**
- NE – Andres Borregales 26-yard field goal, 6:36. Patriots 27–14. **Drive: 4 plays, 3 yards, 0:53.**

**Top passers**

- NYJ – Justin Fields – 15/26, 116 yards, TD
- NE – Drake Maye – 25/34, 281 yards, TD

**Top rushers**

- NYJ – Justin Fields – 11 rushes, 67 yards, TD
- NE – TreVeyon Henderson – 19 rushes, 62 yards, 2 TD

**Top receivers**

- NYJ – John Metchie III – 3 receptions, 45 yards, TD
- NE – Stefon Diggs – 9 receptions, 105 yards

With their 8th straight win, longest since 2019, the Patriots improved to 9–2 for the first time since 2017 and 3–0 against the AFC East, while also securing their first winning season since 2021. The Patriots extended their winning streak against their fellow AFC East teams at home to three games, winning streak against their fellow AFC East teams regardless of location to four games, and both their home and overall winning streak against the Jets to two games.

==== Week 12: at Cincinnati Bengals ====
Week 12: New England Patriots at Cincinnati Bengals – Game summary

| Quarter | 1 | 2 | 3 | 4 | Total |
|---|---|---|---|---|---|
| **Patriots** | 0 | 17 | 3 | 6 | **26** |
| Bengals | 3 | 10 | 0 | 7 | **20** |

at Paycor Stadium, Cincinnati, Ohio

- Date: November 23
- Game time: 1:00 p.m. EST
- Game weather: Sunny, 54 °F (12 °C)
- Game attendance: 65,659
- Referee: Land Clark
- TV announcers (CBS): Kevin Harlan, Trent Green and Melanie Collins
- Recap, Game Book

Game information

**First quarter**

- CIN – Evan McPherson 54-yard field goal, 6:36. Bengals 3–0. **Drive: 11 plays, 46 yards, 5:15.**

**Second quarter**

- CIN – Geno Stone 32-yard interception return (Evan McPherson kick), 14:19. Bengals 10–0.
- NE – Hunter Henry 28-yard pass from Drake Maye (Andres Borregales kick), 9:36. Bengals 10–7. **Drive: 9 plays, 70 yards, 4:43.**
- NE – Marcus Jones 33-yard interception return (Andres Borregales kick), 7:42. Patriots 14–10.
- NE – Andres Borregales 41-yard field goal, 0:28. Patriots 17–10. **Drive: 9 plays, 67 yards, 3:50.**
- CIN – Evan McPherson 63-yard field goal, 0:00. Patriots 17–13. **Drive: 3 plays, 37 yards, 0:28.**

**Third quarter**

- NE – Andres Borregales 45-yard field goal, 1:04. Patriots 20–13. **Drive: 8 plays, 49 yards, 3:54.**

**Fourth quarter**

- NE – Andres Borregales 19-yard field goal, 5:55. Patriots 23–13. **Drive: 13 plays, 79 yards, 7:06.**
- CIN – Mitchell Tinsley 17-yard pass from Joe Flacco (Evan McPherson kick), 4:40. Patriots 23–20. **Drive: 4 plays, 71 yards, 1:15.**
- NE – Andres Borregales 52-yard field goal, 1:51. Patriots 26–20. **Drive: 9 plays, 27 yards, 2:49.**

**Top passers**

- NE – Drake Maye – 22/35, 294 yards, TD, INT
- CIN – Joe Flacco – 19/37, 183 yards, TD, INT

**Top rushers**

- NE – TreVeyon Henderson – 18 rushes, 66 yards
- CIN – Chase Brown – 19 rushes, 107 yards

**Top receivers**

- NE – Hunter Henry – 7 receptions, 115 yards, TD
- CIN – Andrei Iosivas – 4 receptions, 61 yards

With their 9th straight win (second straight against Cincinnati), the Patriots improved to 10–2 record, as well as a 2–1 record against the AFC North. The Patriots also extended their winning streak on the road to 6 games while also securing their 3rd road win in Cincinnati since 2019.

==== Week 13: vs. New York Giants ====
Week 13: New York Giants at New England Patriots – Game summary

| Quarter | 1 | 2 | 3 | 4 | Total |
|---|---|---|---|---|---|
| Giants | 0 | 7 | 0 | 8 | **15** |
| **Patriots** | 17 | 13 | 0 | 3 | **33** |

at Gillette Stadium, Foxborough, Massachusetts

- Date: December 1
- Game time: 8:15 p.m. EST
- Game weather: Mostly clear, 30 °F (−1 °C)
- Game attendance: 64,628
- Referee: Shawn Smith
- TV announcers (ESPN): Joe Buck, Troy Aikman, Lisa Salters and Laura Rutledge
- Recap, Game Book

Game information

**First quarter**

- NE – Andres Borregales 22-yard field goal, 9:14. Patriots 3–0. **Drive: 12 plays, 49 yards, 5:46.**
- NE – Marcus Jones 94-yard punt return (Andres Borregales kick), 5:17. Patriots 10–0.
- NE – Kayshon Boutte 3-yard pass from Drake Maye (Andres Borregales kick), 1:00. Patriots 17–0. **Drive: 5 plays, 61 yards, 2:38.**

**Second quarter**

- NYG – Darius Slayton 30-yard pass from Jaxson Dart (Younghoe Koo kick), 12:46. Patriots 17–7. **Drive: 6 plays, 62 yards, 3:14.**
- NE – Kyle Williams 33-yard pass from Drake Maye (Andres Borregales kick), 3:29. Patriots 24–7. **Drive: 5 plays, 58 yards, 2:53.**
- NE – Andres Borregales 30-yard field goal, 1:48. Patriots 27–7. **Drive: 5 plays, 15 yards, 1:35.**
- NE – Andres Borregales 28-yard field goal, 0:00. Patriots 30–7. **Drive: 5 plays, 67 yards, 1:07.**

**Third quarter**

- No scoring plays

**Fourth quarter**

- NYG – Devin Singletary 22-yard run (Jaxson Dart–Darius Slayton pass), 14:54. Patriots 30–15. **Drive: 9 plays, 65 yards, 4:15.**
- NE – Andres Borregales 23-yard field goal, 2:14. Patriots 33–15. **Drive: 12 plays, 58 yards, 5:27.**

**Top passers**

- NYG – Jaxson Dart – 17/24, 139 yards, TD
- NE – Drake Maye – 24/31, 282 yards, 2 TD

**Top rushers**

- NYG – Devin Singletary – 12 rushes, 68 yards, TD
- NE – TreVeyon Henderson – 11 rushes, 67 yards

**Top receivers**

- NYG – Darius Slayton – 2 receptions, 41 yards, TD
- NE – Hunter Henry – 4 receptions, 73 yards

With their 10th straight win, their longest win streak since 2015, the Patriots improved to 11–2 (the most wins they had since 2019) their best record through 13 games since 2016, and they finished 5–0 against the NFC entering their bye. The Patriots also became the first team since the 1999 Colts to have a 10 game win streak after a 13 loss season. This was also their first win in the Pat Patriot uniforms since Week 5 of the 2022 season, officially snapping a six-game losing streak in them.

==== Week 15: vs. Buffalo Bills ====
Week 15: Buffalo Bills at New England Patriots – Game summary

| Quarter | 1 | 2 | 3 | 4 | Total |
|---|---|---|---|---|---|
| **Bills** | 0 | 7 | 14 | 14 | **35** |
| Patriots | 14 | 10 | 0 | 7 | **31** |

at Gillette Stadium, Foxborough, Massachusetts

- Date: December 14
- Game time: 1:00 p.m. EST
- Game weather: Snow, 32 °F (0 °C)
- Game attendance: 64,628
- Referee: John Hussey
- TV announcers (CBS): Ian Eagle, J. J. Watt and Evan Washburn
- Recap, Game Book

Game information

**First quarter**

- NE – Drake Maye 8-yard run (Andres Borregales kick), 10:21. Patriots 7–0. **Drive: 8 plays, 73 yards, 4:39.**
- NE – Drake Maye 7-yard run (Andres Borregales kick), 0:25. Patriots 14–0. **Drive: 6 plays, 50 yards, 3:18.**

**Second quarter**

- NE – TreVeyon Henderson 52-yard run (Andres Borregales kick), 5:53. Patriots 21–0. **Drive: 8 plays, 94 yards, 4:37.**
- BUF – James Cook 5-yard pass from Josh Allen (Matt Prater kick), 1:56. Patriots 21–7. **Drive: 7 plays, 42 yards, 3:57.**
- NE – Andres Borregales 36-yard field goal, 0:00. Patriots 24–7. **Drive: 7 plays, 47 yards, 1:56.**

**Third quarter**

- BUF – Dawson Knox 4-yard pass from Josh Alen (Matt Prater kick), 11:29. Patriots 24–14. **Drive: 6 plays, 44 yards, 3:31.**
- BUF – James Cook 3-yard run (Matt Prater kick), 3:49. Patriots 24–21. **Drive: 11 plays, 70 yards, 5:29.**

**Fourth quarter**

- BUF – Dawson Knox 14-yard pass from Josh Allen (Matt Prater kick), 10:03. Bills 28–24. **Drive: 13 plays, 91 yards, 6:27.**
- NE – TreVeyon Henderson 65-yard run (Andres Borregales kick), 9:49. Patriots 31–28. **Drive: 1 play, 65 yards, 0:14.**
- BUF – James Cook 11-yard run (Matt Prater kick), 6:48. Bills 35–31. **Drive: 7 plays, 65 yards, 3:01.**

**Top passers**

- BUF – Josh Allen – 19/28, 193 yards, 3 TD
- NE – Drake Maye – 14/23, 155 yards, INT

**Top rushers**

- BUF – James Cook – 22 rushes, 107 yards, 2 TD
- NE – TreVeyon Henderson – 14 rushes, 148 yards, 2 TD

**Top receivers**

- BUF – Khalil Shakir – 5 receptions, 65 yards
- NE – Mack Hollins – 4 receptions, 41 yards

With an opportunity to clinch the AFC East title for the first time since 2019 by defeating the Bills, the Patriots built a 21–0 lead and held a 24–7 lead at halftime. However, despite a strong running game, New England was outscored 28–7 in the second half as Drake Maye was held under 200 passing yards for the first time all season. With their first loss since Week 3, New England’s 10-game winning streak was snapped, and the team fell to 11–3 overall and 3–1 in the AFC East marking both the 6th straight year they failed to sweep the Bills & 13th straight year they failed to sweep the AFC East.

The 21-point blown lead was their largest since a similar instance in which they lost a 21-point first-half lead against the Bills during the 2011 season. Their 21-point lead was the largest the Pats had squandered at home since 1978. The loss also snapped the Patriots’ 120-game home winning streak when leading by 17 or more points, the longest streak in NFL history.

==== Week 16: at Baltimore Ravens ====
Week 16: New England Patriots at Baltimore Ravens – Game summary

| Quarter | 1 | 2 | 3 | 4 | Total |
|---|---|---|---|---|---|
| **Patriots** | 0 | 10 | 3 | 15 | **28** |
| Ravens | 7 | 3 | 7 | 7 | **24** |

at M&T Bank Stadium, Baltimore, Maryland

- Date: December 21
- Game time: 8:20 p.m. EST
- Game weather: Clear, 40 °F (4 °C)
- Game attendance: 70,709
- Referee: Brad Rogers
- TV announcers (NBC): Mike Tirico, Cris Collinsworth, and Melissa Stark
- Recap, Game Book

Game information

**First quarter**

- BAL – Derrick Henry 21-yard run (Tyler Loop kick), 12:21. Ravens 7–0. **Drive: 5 plays, 65 yards, 2:39.**

**Second quarter**

- NE – Hunter Henry 1-yard pass from Drake Maye (Andres Borregales kick), 11:17. Tied 7–7. **Drive: 10 plays, 68 yards, 5:26.**
- NE – Andres Borregales 45-yard field goal, 5:39. Patriots 10–7. **Drive: 9 plays, 48 yards, 4:42.**
- BAL – Tyler Loop 36-yard field goal, 1:03. Tied 10–10. **Drive: 11 plays, 47 yards, 4:36.**

**Third quarter**

- NE – Andres Borregales 41-yard field goal, 7:43. Patriots 13–10. **Drive: 6 plays, 32 yards, 2:55.**
- BAL – Zay Flowers 18-yard run (Tyler Loop kick), 4:35. Ravens 17–13. **Drive: 6 plays, 65 yards, 3:08.**

**Fourth quarter**

- BAL – Derrick Henry 2-yard run (Tyler Loop kick), 12:50. Ravens 24–13. **Drive: 7 plays, 44 yards, 4:03.**
- NE – Kyle Williams 37-yard pass from Drake Maye (Drake Maye–Rhamondre Stevenson pass), 9:01. Ravens 24–21. **Drive: 7 plays, 73 yards, 3:49.**
- NE – Rhamondre Stevenson 21-yard run (Andres Borregales kick), 2:07. Patriots 28–24. **Drive: 9 plays, 89 yards, 2:55.**

**Top passers**

- NE – Drake Maye – 31/44, 380 yards, 2 TD, INT
- BAL – Lamar Jackson – 7/10, 101 yards

**Top rushers**

- NE – Rhamondre Stevenson – 8 rushes, 51 yards, TD
- BAL – Derrick Henry – 18 rushes, 128 yards, 2 TD

**Top receivers**

- NE – Stefon Diggs – 9 receptions, 138 yards
- BAL – Zay Flowers – 7 receptions, 84 yards

At the end of the half, Ravens quarterback Lamar Jackson was taken out of the game with a back injury and was later ruled out. In the fourth quarter, Ravens running back Derrick Henry rushed for a touchdown to give the Ravens a 24–13 lead. Drake Maye then rallied the Patriots, throwing two touchdown passes to give New England a 28–24 lead. On Baltimore’s next drive, Ravens wide receiver Zay Flowers fumbled, and the Patriots ran out the clock to secure the win.

With the win, the Patriots improved to 12–3, finishing 3–1 against the AFC North, and clinched their first playoff berth since 2021.

==== Week 17: at New York Jets ====
Week 17: New England Patriots at New York Jets – Game summary

| Quarter | 1 | 2 | 3 | 4 | Total |
|---|---|---|---|---|---|
| **Patriots** | 14 | 21 | 7 | 0 | **42** |
| Jets | 0 | 3 | 0 | 7 | **10** |

at MetLife Stadium, East Rutherford, New Jersey

- Date: December 28
- Game time: 1:00 p.m. EST
- Game weather: Cloudy, 29 °F (−2 °C)
- Game attendance: 70,918
- Referee: Alex Kemp
- TV announcers (Fox): Adam Amin, Drew Brees and Kristina Pink
- Recap, Game Book

Game information

**First quarter**

- NE – Austin Hooper 2-yard pass from Drake Maye (Andres Borregales kick), 10:42. Patriots 7–0. **Drive: 7 plays, 61 yards, 4:18.**
- NE – Rhamondre Stevenson 1-yard run (Andres Borregales kick), 5:06. Patriots 14–0. **Drive: 7 plays, 85 yards, 4:07.**

**Second quarter**

- NE – Rhamondre Stevenson 22-yard pass from Drake Maye (Andres Borregales kick), 14:55. Patriots 21–0. **Drive: 7 plays, 66 yards, 3:40.**
- NYJ – Nick Folk 39-yard field goal, 9:56. Patriots 21–3. **Drive: 9 plays, 49 yards, 4:59.**
- NE – Stefon Diggs 3-yard pass from Drake Maye (Andres Borregales kick), 3:01. Patriots 28–3. **Drive: 11 plays, 74 yards, 6:55.**
- NE – Hunter Henry 13-yard pass from Drake Maye (Andres Borregales kick), 0:31. Patriots 35–3. **Drive: 10 plays, 91 yards, 1:17.**

**Third quarter**

- NE – Efton Chism III 10-yard pass from Drake Maye (Andres Borregales kick), 8:16. Patriots 42–3. **Drive: 6 plays, 47 yards, 3:30.**

**Fourth quarter**

- NYJ – Breece Hall 59-yard run (Nick Folk kick), 14:51. Patriots 42–10. **Drive: 4 plays, 69 yards, 1:57.**

**Top passers**

- NE – Drake Maye – 19/21, 256 yards, 5 TD
- NYJ – Brady Cook – 19/33, 152 yards, INT

**Top rushers**

- NE – TreVeyon Henderson – 19 rushes, 82 yards
- NYJ – Breece Hall – 14 rushes, 111 yards, TD

**Top receivers**

- NE – Stefon Diggs – 6 receptions, 101 yards, TD
- NYJ – John Metchie III – 3 receptions, 41 yards

With their first sweep over the Jets since 2022, the Patriots improved to 13–3 (4–1 against the AFC East) and finished 8–0 on the road for the third time in franchise history (first since 2016).

In addition, Philadelphia's 13–12 win over Buffalo later that day resulted in the Patriots clinching the AFC East for the first time since 2019.

==== Week 18: vs. Miami Dolphins ====
Week 18: Miami Dolphins at New England Patriots – Game summary

| Quarter | 1 | 2 | 3 | 4 | Total |
|---|---|---|---|---|---|
| Dolphins | 0 | 10 | 0 | 0 | **10** |
| **Patriots** | 14 | 3 | 14 | 7 | **38** |

at Gillette Stadium, Foxborough, Massachusetts

- Date: January 4
- Game time: 4:25 p.m. EST
- Game weather: Partly cloudy, 29 °F (−2 °C)
- Game attendance: 64,628
- Referee: Clay Martin
- TV announcers (Fox): Joe Davis, Greg Olsen and Pam Oliver
- Recap, Game Book

Game information

**First quarter**

- NE – TreVeyon Henderson 5-yard run (Andres Borregales kick), 13:14. Patriots 7–0. **Drive: 3 plays, 70 yards, 1:46.**
- NE – Rhamondre Stevenson 2-yard run (Andres Borregales kick), 0:55. Patriots 14–0. **Drive: 9 plays, 92 yards, 4:55.**

**Second quarter**

- MIA – Malik Washington 2-yard pass from Quinn Ewers (Riley Patterson kick), 10:14. Patriots 14–7. **Drive: 10 plays, 65 yards, 5:41.**
- MIA – Riley Patterson 52-yard field goal, 0:28. Patriots 14–10. **Drive: 4 plays, 6 yards, 1:03.**
- NE – Andres Borregales 59-yard field goal, 0:00. Patriots 17–10. **Drive: 4 plays, 27 yards, 0:28.**

**Third quarter**

- NE – Rhamondre Stevenson 15-yard pass from Drake Maye (Andres Borregales kick), 7:30. Patriots 24–10. **Drive: 7 plays, 80 yards, 4:08.**
- NE – Rhamondre Stevenson 35-yard run (Andres Borregales kick), 2:18. Patriots 31–10. **Drive: 4 plays, 63 yards, 2:06.**

**Fourth quarter**

- NE – TreVeyon Henderson 2-yard run (Andres Borregales kick), 12:39. Patriots 38–10. **Drive: 5 plays, 51 yards, 3:00.**

**Top passers**

- MIA – Quinn Ewers – 16/23, 137 yards, TD, INT
- NE – Drake Maye – 14/18, 191 yards, TD

**Top rushers**

- MIA – Jaylen Wright – 13 rushes, 23 yards
- NE – Rhamondre Stevenson – 7 rushes, 131 yards, 2 TD

**Top receivers**

- MIA – Theo Wease Jr. – 3 receptions, 44 yards
- NE – Hunter Henry – 5 receptions, 56 yards

With this win, the Patriots swept their games against the Dolphins for the first time since 2016. Their 14–3 finish, their best since that same 2016 season, was tied for the best record in the conference with Denver (and in the league with Seattle), but the Patriots failed to clinch the #1 seed for the eighth straight year; the Broncos won the tiebreaker on common opponents. The Patriots instead clinched the #2 seed. New England ended their regular season with a 5–1 record against the AFC East and 6–3 at home.

=== Standings ===
==== Division ====
AFC East
| | W | L | T | PCT | DIV | CONF | PF | PA | STK |
|---|---|---|---|---|---|---|---|---|---|
| ^{(2)} New England Patriots | 14 | 3 | 0 | .824 | 5–1 | 9–3 | 490 | 320 | W3 |
| ^{(6)} Buffalo Bills | 12 | 5 | 0 | .706 | 4–2 | 9–3 | 481 | 365 | W1 |
| Miami Dolphins | 7 | 10 | 0 | .412 | 3–3 | 3–9 | 347 | 424 | L1 |
| New York Jets | 3 | 14 | 0 | .176 | 0–6 | 2–10 | 300 | 503 | L5 |

==== Conference ====
AFC
| Seed | Team | Division | W | L | T | PCT | DIV | CONF | SOS | SOV | STK |
|---|---|---|---|---|---|---|---|---|---|---|---|
**Division leaders**
| 1 (Note: Denver finished ahead of New England based on common games (Denver 6–0 to New England 5–1 against: Cincinnati, Las Vegas, NY Giants, NY Jets and Tennessee).) | Denver Broncos | West | 14 | 3 | 0 | .824 | 5–1 | 9–3 | .422 | .378 | W2 |
| 2 | New England Patriots | East | 14 | 3 | 0 | .824 | 5–1 | 9–3 | .391 | .370 | W3 |
| 3 | Jacksonville Jaguars | South | 13 | 4 | 0 | .765 | 5–1 | 10–2 | .478 | .425 | W8 |
| 4 | Pittsburgh Steelers | North | 10 | 7 | 0 | .588 | 4–2 | 8–4 | .503 | .453 | W1 |
**Wild cards**
| 5 (Note: Houston finished ahead of Buffalo based on head-to-head victory.) | Houston Texans | South | 12 | 5 | 0 | .706 | 5–1 | 10–2 | .522 | .441 | W9 |
| 6 | Buffalo Bills | East | 12 | 5 | 0 | .706 | 4–2 | 9–3 | .471 | .412 | W1 |
| 7 | Los Angeles Chargers | West | 11 | 6 | 0 | .647 | 5–1 | 8–4 | .469 | .425 | L2 |
**Did not qualify for the postseason**
| 8 (Note: Indianapolis finished ahead of Baltimore based on conference record (Indianapolis 6–6 to Baltimore 5–7).) | Indianapolis Colts | South | 8 | 9 | 0 | .471 | 2–4 | 6–6 | .540 | .382 | L7 |
| 9 | Baltimore Ravens | North | 8 | 9 | 0 | .471 | 3–3 | 5–7 | .507 | .408 | L1 |
| 10 | Miami Dolphins | East | 7 | 10 | 0 | .412 | 3–3 | 3–9 | .488 | .378 | L1 |
| 11 (Note: Cincinnati finished ahead of Kansas City based on conference record (Cincinnati 5–7 to Kansas City 3–9).) | Cincinnati Bengals | North | 6 | 11 | 0 | .353 | 3–3 | 5–7 | .521 | .451 | L1 |
| 12 | Kansas City Chiefs | West | 6 | 11 | 0 | .353 | 1–5 | 3–9 | .514 | .363 | L6 |
| 13 | Cleveland Browns | North | 5 | 12 | 0 | .294 | 2–4 | 4–8 | .486 | .418 | W2 |
| 14 (Note: Las Vegas finished ahead of NY Jets and Tennessee based on conference record (Las Vegas 3–9 to NY Jets 2–10 and Tennessee 2–10).) | Las Vegas Raiders | West | 3 | 14 | 0 | .176 | 1–5 | 3–9 | .538 | .451 | W1 |
| 15 (Note: NY Jets finished ahead of Tennessee based on strength of victory (NY Jets .373 to Tennessee .275).) | New York Jets | East | 3 | 14 | 0 | .176 | 0–6 | 2–10 | .552 | .373 | L5 |
| 16 | Tennessee Titans | South | 3 | 14 | 0 | .176 | 0–6 | 2–10 | .574 | .275 | L2 |
**Tiebreakers** (Note: When breaking ties for three or more teams under the NFL's rules, they are first broken within divisions, then comparing only the highest ranked remaining team from each division.)

== Postseason ==
=== Schedule ===
| Round | Date | Opponent (seed) | Result | Record | Venue | Sources |
|---|---|---|---|---|---|---|
| Wild Card | January 11 | Los Angeles Chargers (7) | W 16–3 | 1–0 | Gillette Stadium | Recap |
| Divisional | January 18 | Houston Texans (5) | W 28–16 | 2–0 | Gillette Stadium | Recap |
| AFC Championship | January 25 | at Denver Broncos (1) | W 10–7 | 3–0 | Empower Field at Mile High | Recap |
| Super Bowl LX | February 8 | vs. Seattle Seahawks (N1) | L 13–29 | 3–1 | Levi's Stadium | Recap |

=== Game summaries ===
==== AFC Wild Card Playoffs: vs. (7) Los Angeles Chargers ====
AFC Wild Card Playoffs: (7) Los Angeles Chargers at (2) New England Patriots – Game summary

| Quarter | 1 | 2 | 3 | 4 | Total |
|---|---|---|---|---|---|
| Chargers | 0 | 3 | 0 | 0 | 3 |
| Patriots | 0 | 6 | 3 | 7 | 16 |

at Gillette Stadium, Foxborough, Massachusetts

- Date: January 11, 2026
- Game time: 8:15 p.m. EST
- Game weather: Clear, 35 °F (2 °C)
- Game attendance: 64,628
- Referee: Ron Torbert
- TV announcers (NBC): Mike Tirico, Cris Collinsworth and Melissa Stark
- Recap, Game Book

Game information

First quarter

- No scoring plays

Second quarter

- NE – Andres Borregales 23-yard field goal, 13:32. Patriots 3–0. Drive: 14 plays, 93 yards, 6:40.
- LAC – Cameron Dicker 21-yard field goal, 6:52. Tied 3–3. Drive: 11 plays, 69 yards, 6:40.
- NE – Andres Borregales 35-yard field goal, 0:02. Patriots 6–3. Drive: 5 plays, 37 yards, 0:29.

Third quarter

- NE – Andres Borregales 39-yard field goal, 1:34. Patriots 9–3. Drive: 8 plays, 64 yards, 3:36.

Fourth quarter

- NE – Hunter Henry 28-yard pass from Drake Maye (Andres Borregales kick), 9:45. Patriots 16–3. Drive: 7 plays, 80 yards, 4:16.

Top passers

- LAC – Justin Herbert – 19/31, 159 yards
- NE – Drake Maye – 17/29, 268 yards, TD, INT

Top rushers

- LAC – Justin Herbert – 10 rushes, 57 yards
- NE – Drake Maye – 10 rushes, 66 yards

Top receivers

- LAC – Ladd McConkey – 3 receptions, 32 yards
- NE – Rhamondre Stevenson – 3 receptions, 75 yards

With their first win over the Chargers since 2021, the Patriots secured their first playoff win since Super Bowl LIII and their first in the Wild Card Round since 2006. This also marked their fourth consecutive playoff victory over the Chargers since that year.

==== AFC Divisional Playoffs: vs. (5) Houston Texans ====
AFC Divisional Playoffs: (5) Houston Texans at (2) New England Patriots – Game summary

| Quarter | 1 | 2 | 3 | 4 | Total |
|---|---|---|---|---|---|
| Texans | 3 | 7 | 6 | 0 | 16 |
| Patriots | 7 | 14 | 0 | 7 | 28 |

at Gillette Stadium, Foxborough, Massachusetts

- Date: January 18, 2026
- Game time: 3:05 p.m. EST
- Game weather: Snow, 35 °F (2 °C)
- Game attendance: 64,628
- Referee: Shawn Smith
- TV announcers (ESPN/ABC): Joe Buck, Troy Aikman, Lisa Salters and Laura Rutledge
- Recap, Game Book

Game information

First quarter

- NE – Demario Douglas 28-yard pass from Drake Maye (Andres Borregales kick), 9:35. Patriots 7–0. Drive: 6 plays, 66 yards, 3:18.
- HOU – Ka'imi Fairbairn 25-yard field goal, 5:26. Patriots 7–3. Drive: 10 plays, 65 yards, 4:09.

Second quarter

- HOU – Christian Kirk 10-yard pass from C. J. Stroud (Ka'imi Fairbairn kick), 12:51. Texans 10–7. Drive: 6 plays, 27 yards, 3:02.
- NE – Marcus Jones 26-yard interception return (Andres Borregales kick), 10:31. Patriots 14–10.
- NE – Stefon Diggs 7-yard pass from Drake Maye (Andres Borregales kick), 3:12. Patriots 21–10. Drive: 5 plays, 56 yards, 2:48.

Third quarter

- HOU – Ka'imi Fairbairn 25-yard field goal, 9:45. Patriots 21–13. Drive: 11 plays, 58 yards, 5:15.
- HOU – Ka'imi Fairbairn 51-yard field goal, 1:32. Patriots 21–16. Drive: 6 plays, 26 yards, 1:56.

Fourth quarter

- NE – Kayshon Boutte 32-yard pass from Drake Maye (Andres Borregales kick), 12:58. Patriots 28–16. Drive: 6 plays, 71 yards, 3:34.

Top passers

- HOU – C. J. Stroud – 20/47, 212 yards, TD, 4 INT
- NE – Drake Maye – 16/27, 179 yards, 3 TD, INT

Top rushers

- HOU – Woody Marks – 14 rushes, 17 yards
- NE – Rhamondre Stevenson – 16 rushes, 70 yards

Top receivers

- HOU – Jayden Higgins – 6 receptions, 59 yards
- NE – Kayshon Boutte – 3 receptions, 75 yards, TD

With their ninth consecutive Divisional Round win since 2011, the Patriots secured their first trip to the AFC Championship game since 2018 while improving to 3–0 against the Texans in the playoffs. It was the Patriots first win over Houston since 2021.

==== AFC Championship: at (1) Denver Broncos ====
AFC Championship: (2) New England Patriots at (1) Denver Broncos – Game summary

| Quarter | 1 | 2 | 3 | 4 | Total |
|---|---|---|---|---|---|
| Patriots | 0 | 7 | 3 | 0 | 10 |
| Broncos | 7 | 0 | 0 | 0 | 7 |

at Empower Field at Mile High, Denver, Colorado

- Date: January 25, 2026
- Game time: 3:05 p.m. EST/1:05 p.m. MST
- Game weather: Cloudy, 26 °F (−3 °C)
- Game attendance: 76,862
- Referee: Alex Kemp
- TV announcers (CBS): Jim Nantz, Tony Romo, Tracy Wolfson and Evan Washburn
- Recap, Game Book

Game information

First quarter

- DEN – Courtland Sutton 6-yard pass from Jarrett Stidham (Wil Lutz kick), 10:19. Broncos 7–0. Drive: 5 plays, 59 yards, 1:41.

Second quarter

- NE – Drake Maye 6-yard run (Andres Borregales kick), 2:10. Tied 7–7. Drive: 2 plays, 12 yards, 0:42.

Third quarter

- NE – Andres Borregales 23-yard field goal, 5:29. Patriots 10–7. Drive: 16 plays, 64 yards, 9:31.

Fourth quarter

- No scoring plays

Top passers

- NE – Drake Maye – 10/21, 86 yards
- DEN – Jarrett Stidham – 17/31, 133 yards, TD, INT

Top rushers

- NE – Rhamondre Stevenson – 25 rushes, 71 yards
- DEN – RJ Harvey – 13 rushes, 37 yards

Top receivers

- NE – Mack Hollins – 2 receptions, 51 yards
- DEN – Marvin Mims – 4 receptions, 62 yards

With Bo Nix injured in the previous game, the Patriots faced the Broncos' backup quarterback, Jarrett Stidham, who had taken only four snaps and thrown no passes the entire season. Both defenses played well, even before it started snowing, but the Patriots eked out a win.

With their first playoff win over the Broncos since 2011, the Patriots secured their first AFC conference title since 2018. It was also their first playoff win in Denver in franchise history, along with their fourth consecutive win in Denver since 2016. This win marked the Patriots' 40th playoff win in franchise history, tying an NFL record with the San Francisco 49ers.

==== Super Bowl LX: vs. (N1) Seattle Seahawks ====
Super Bowl LX: (N1) Seattle Seahawks vs. (A2) New England Patriots – Game summary

| Quarter | 1 | 2 | 3 | 4 | Total |
|---|---|---|---|---|---|
| Seahawks | 3 | 6 | 3 | 17 | 29 |
| Patriots | 0 | 0 | 0 | 13 | 13 |

at Levi's Stadium, Santa Clara, California

- Date: February 8, 2026
- Game time: 6:40 p.m. EST/3:40 p.m. PST
- Game weather: Fair, 67 °F (19 °C)
- Game attendance: 70,823
- Referee: Shawn Smith
- TV announcers (NBC): Mike Tirico, Cris Collinsworth, Melissa Stark and Kaylee Hartung
- Recap, Game Book

Game information

First quarter

- SEA – Jason Myers 33-yard field goal, 11:58. Seahawks 3–0. Drive: 8 plays, 51 yards, 3:02.

Second quarter

- SEA – Jason Myers 39-yard field goal, 11:16. Seahawks 6–0. Drive: 8 plays, 55 yards, 2:54.
- SEA – Jason Myers 41-yard field goal, 0:11. Seahawks 9–0. Drive: 9 plays, 34 yards, 2:39.

Third quarter

- SEA – Jason Myers 41-yard field goal, 9:12. Seahawks 12–0. Drive: 10 plays, 69 yards, 4:50.

Fourth quarter

- SEA – AJ Barner 16-yard pass from Sam Darnold (Jason Myers kick), 13:24. Seahawks 19–0. Drive: 5 plays, 37 yards, 1:46.
- NE – Mack Hollins 35-yard pass from Drake Maye (Andres Borregales kick), 12:27. Seahawks 19–7. Drive: 3 plays, 65 yards, 0:57.
- SEA – Jason Myers 26-yard field goal, 5:35. Seahawks 22–7. Drive: 6 plays, 30 yards, 3:02.
- SEA – Uchenna Nwosu 44-yard interception return (Jason Myers kick), 4:27. Seahawks 29–7.
- NE – Rhamondre Stevenson 7-yard pass from Drake Maye (pass failed), 2:21. Seahawks 29–13. Drive: 8 plays, 65 yards, 2:06.

Top passers

- SEA – Sam Darnold – 19/38, 202 yards, TD
- NE – Drake Maye – 27/43, 295 yards, 2 TD, 2 INT

Top rushers

- SEA – Kenneth Walker III – 27 rushes, 135 yards
- NE – Drake Maye – 5 rushes, 37 yards

Top receivers

- SEA – Cooper Kupp – 6 receptions, 61 yards
- NE – Mack Hollins – 4 receptions, 78 yards, TD

The Patriots played in their 12th Super Bowl in franchise history, extending their NFL record. It was their second Super Bowl against the Seahawks, having defeated them in Super Bowl XLIX. However, this game would not have the same outcome.

The Seahawks' defense dominated. Under constant pressure, Maye was ineffective and committed three turnovers—a fumble and two interceptions, including a pick six by Uchenna Nwosu—which led to 17 Seahawks points. The more experienced Sam Darnold, on the other hand, was often able to evade Patriots' defenders in the backfield and remained turnover-free (committing none in the entire postseason), and Super Bowl Most Valuable Player Kenneth Walker III picked up 135 rushing yards.

It was New England's fourth consecutive loss to Seattle since 2016 and their first loss in the Super Bowl since Super Bowl LII. This resulted in the Patriots recording their sixth Super Bowl loss, breaking a tie with the Denver Broncos for the NFL record, and evening their Super Bowl record at 6–6.
