= Craig Woodson =

American football player (born 2001)

No. 4 – New England Patriots
- Position: Safety
- Roster status: Active

Personal information
- Born: February 20, 2001 (age 25); Nashville, Tennessee, U.S.
- Listed height: 6 ft 0 in (1.83 m)
- Listed weight: 200 lb (91 kg)

Career information
- High school: South Grand Prairie (Grand Prairie, Texas)
- College: California (2019–2024)
- NFL draft: 2025: 4th round, 106th overall pick

Career history
- New England Patriots (2025–present)

Awards and highlights
- Third-team All-ACC (2024)

Career NFL statistics as of Week 1, 2026
- Total tackles: 84
- Fumble recoveries: 2
- Pass deflections: 3
- Interceptions: 1
- Stats at Pro Football Reference

Craig Woodson (born February 20, 2001) is an American professional football safety for New England Patriots of the National Football League (NFL). He played college football for the California Golden Bears and was selected by the Patriots in the fourth round of the 2025 NFL draft.

== Early life ==
Woodson was born in Nashville, Tennessee and grew up in Grand Prairie, Texas. He attended South Grand Prairie High School, and committed to play college football for the California Golden Bears.

== College career ==
In his first two seasons in 2019 and 2020, Woodson appeared in eight games where he recorded 19 tackles and two pass deflections. He missed the entire season 2021 season with a knee injury. In the 2022 season opener, Woodson recorded his first career interception, which he returned 39 yards for a touchdown, in a win over UC Davis. Over the next two seasons in 2022 and 2023, he became a full-time starter where he totaled 154 tackles with six and a half being for a loss, nine pass deflections, three interceptions, and three forced fumbles. In his final collegiate season in 2024, Woodson notched 70 tackles with two and a half being for a loss, nine pass deflections, two interceptions, and a fumble recovery for the Golden Bears. After the conclusion of the 2024 season, Woodson declared for the 2025 NFL draft, where he also accepted an invite to participate in the 2025 NFL scouting combine. Woodson graduated from the University of California, Berkeley with a degree in film and media in 2023.

== Professional career ==
Pre-draft measurables
| Height | Weight | Arm length | Hand span | Wingspan | 40-yard dash | 10-yard split | 20-yard split | 20-yard shuttle | Three-cone drill | Vertical jump | Broad jump | Bench press |
|---|---|---|---|---|---|---|---|---|---|---|---|---|
| 6 ft 0 1/8 in (1.83 m) | 200 lb (91 kg) | 30 1/2 in (0.77 m) | 8 3/4 in (0.22 m) | 6 ft 3 1/4 in (1.91 m) | 4.45 s | 1.53 s | 2.59 s | 4.20 s | 7.06 s | 36.0 in (0.91 m) | 10 ft 7 in (3.23 m) | 13 reps |
All values from NFL Combine/Pro Day

Woodson was selected by the New England Patriots in the fourth round with the 106th overall pick in the 2025 NFL draft. He signed a four-year rookie contract worth $5.27 million, with a $1.07 million signing bonus. In his rookie season, Woodson played in all 17 games, recording 79 tackles. He made his playoff debut on January 11, 2026, in a 16–3 win against the Los Angeles Chargers in the Wild Card round. Woodson led the Patriots in tackles in Super Bowl LX with ten total in the 29–13 loss to the Seattle Seahawks.

In Week 4 during the 2026 season, Woodson made his first career interception in a 29-26 win against the Buffalo Bills, and that sealed the win for New England.

== NFL career statistics ==
Legend
| | Led the league |
| **Bold** | Career high |

=== Regular season ===
| Year | Team | Games | | Tackles | | | | | Interceptions | | | | | | Fumbles | | | | |
| Year | Team | GP | GS | Cmb | Solo | Ast | Sck | TFL | Int | Yds | Avg | Lng | TD | PD | FF | Fmb | FR | Yds | TD |
|---|---|---|---|---|---|---|---|---|---|---|---|---|---|---|---|---|---|---|---|
| 2025 | NE | 17 | 15 | 79 | 42 | 37 | 0.0 | 4 | 0 | 0 | 0.0 | 0 | 0 | 3 | 0 | 0 | 2 | 0 | 0 |
| 2026 | NE | 1 | 1 | 5 | 5 | 0 | 0.0 | 0 | 1 | 0 | 0.0 | 0 | 0 | 0 | 0 | 0 | 0 | 0 | 0 |
| Career | | 18 | 16 | 84 | 47 | 37 | 0.0 | 4 | 1 | 0 | 0.0 | 0 | 0 | 3 | 0 | 0 | 2 | 0 | 0 |

=== Postseason ===
| Year | Team | Games | | Tackles | | | | | Interceptions | | | | | | Fumbles | | | | |
| Year | Team | GP | GS | Cmb | Solo | Ast | Sck | TFL | Int | Yds | Avg | Lng | TD | PD | FF | Fmb | FR | Yds | TD |
|---|---|---|---|---|---|---|---|---|---|---|---|---|---|---|---|---|---|---|---|
| 2025 | NE | 4 | 4 | 30 | 20 | 10 | 0.0 | 4 | 1 | 0 | 0.0 | 0 | 0 | 6 | 0 | 0 | 1 | 0 | 0 |
| Career | | 4 | 4 | 30 | 20 | 10 | 0.0 | 4 | 1 | 0 | 0.0 | 0 | 0 | 6 | 0 | 0 | 1 | 0 | 0 |
