= Charles Woods (American football) =

American football player (born 2000)

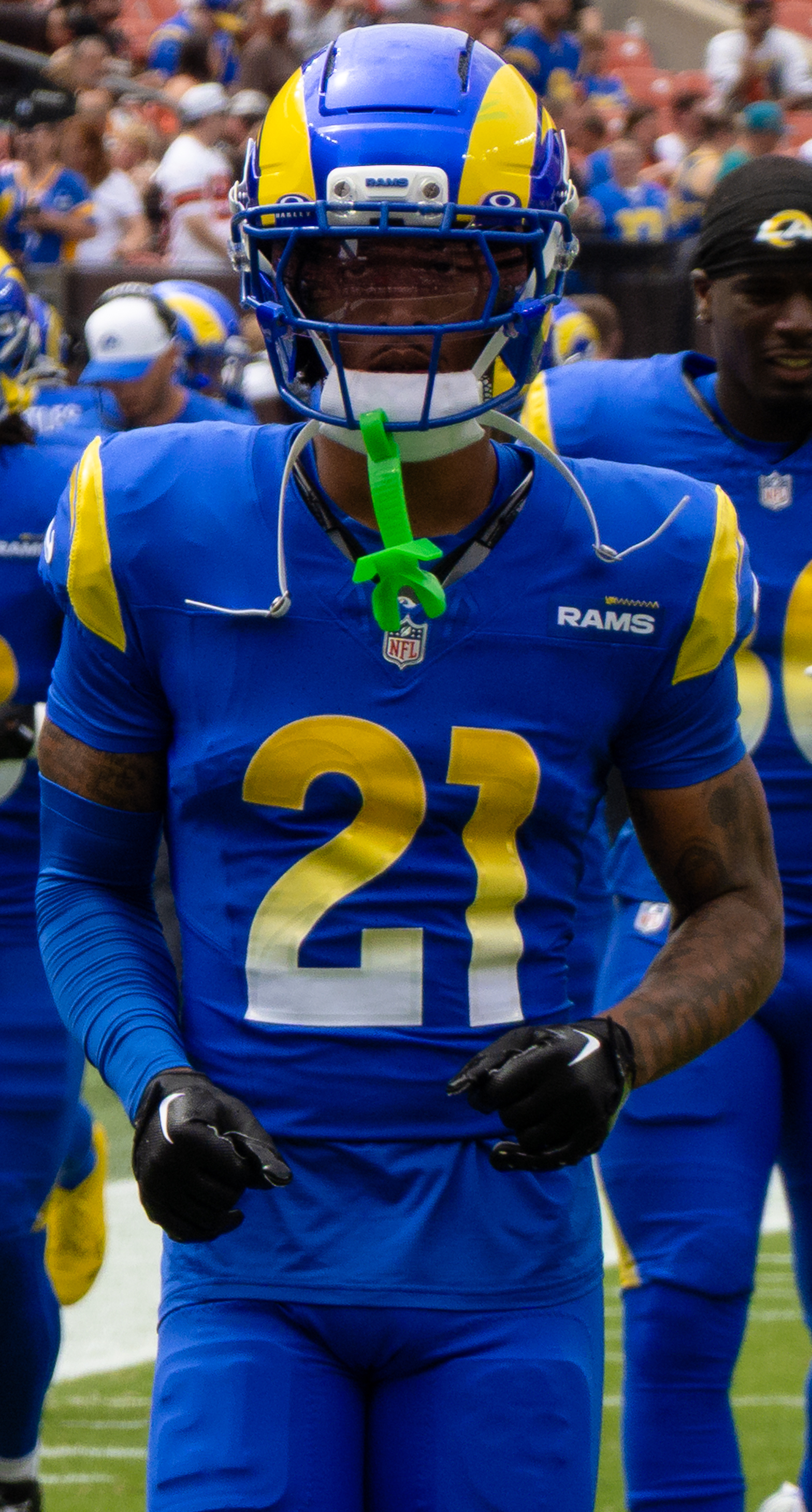
- Woods with the Los Angeles Rams in 2025

No. 22 – New England Patriots
- Position: Cornerback
- Roster status: Active

Personal information
- Born: June 17, 2000 (age 26); Dallas, Texas, U.S.
- Listed height: 5 ft 11 in (1.80 m)
- Listed weight: 185 lb (84 kg)

Career information
- High school: Justin F. Kimball (Dallas)
- College: Illinois State (2018–2020); West Virginia (2021–2022); SMU (2023)
- NFL draft: 2024: undrafted

Career history
- Los Angeles Rams (2024); New England Patriots (2025–present)

Awards and highlights
- Third team All-AAC (2023)

Career NFL statistics as of Week 1, 2026
- Total tackles: 15
- Pass deflections: 1
- Stats at Pro Football Reference

Charles Woods (born June 17, 2000) is an American professional football cornerback for the New England Patriots of the National Football League (NFL). He played college football for the Illinois State Redbirds, West Virginia Mountaineers and SMU Mustangs.

== Early life ==
Woods was born on June 17, 2000, in Dallas, Texas. He attended Justin F. Kimball High School in Dallas, participating in football, basketball and track and field. With the football team, he was a second-team all-district selection as a junior and a first-team choice as a senior, finishing his senior year with 35 receptions for 678 yards, 27 carries for 148 yards, and a total of 16 touchdowns. He committed to play college football for the Illinois State Redbirds, being a no-star recruit.

== College career ==
Woods, a defensive back in college, appeared in 11 games, three as a starter, as a freshman in 2018, totaling 16 tackles. He then started all 15 games in 2019 and was named honorable mention FCS Sophomore All-American by HERO Sports, having finished the season with 48 tackles, four interceptions and a mark of 17 passes defended that placed second in the Missouri Valley Football Conference (MVFC). He started all four games in the COVID-19-shortened 2020 season, posting 20 tackles along with two interceptions. He announced that he was leaving the school following the 2020 season.

Woods initially opted to transfer to the SMU Mustangs, but later flipped his commitment to the West Virginia Mountaineers. In his first year with the Mountaineers, 2021, he totaled 31 tackles, two interceptions, and two fumble recoveries. He opted to redshirt in 2022 and appeared in four games, three as a starter, recording seven solo tackles. He opted to transfer again after the 2022 season for his final year of eligibility, eventually choosing to commit to the SMU Mustangs, which he had been committed to for a time before joining the Mountaineers. In his lone year with the Mustangs, Woods started all 14 games, posting 27 tackles and a team-leading 11 pass breakups while being named third-team All-American Athletic Conference (AAC).

== Professional career ==
Pre-draft measurables
Height	Weight	Arm length	Hand span	Wingspan	40-yard dash	10-yard split	20-yard split	20-yard shuttle	Three-cone drill	Vertical jump	Broad jump
5 ft 10 7/8 in (1.80 m)	184 lb (83 kg)	30 3/8 in (0.77 m)	9 in (0.23 m)	5 ft 11 3/4 in (1.82 m)	4.59 s	1.65 s	2.69 s	4.28 s	6.89 s	30.5 in (0.77 m)	9 ft 7 in (2.92 m)
All values from Pro Day

=== Los Angeles Rams ===
After going unselected in the 2024 NFL draft, Woods signed with the Los Angeles Rams as an undrafted free agent. He made the team's initial 53-man roster for the 2024 season. On December 2, Woods was waived, and re-signed to the practice squad. He signed a reserve/future contract on January 20, 2025.

On August 26, 2025, Woods was waived by the Rams as part of final roster cuts.

=== New England Patriots ===
On August 27, 2025, Woods was claimed off waivers by the New England Patriots.

== NFL career statistics ==
Legend
**Bold**	Career high

=== Regular season ===
Year	Team	Games		Tackles					Interceptions						Fumbles				
Year	Team	GP	GS	Cmb	Solo	Ast	Sck	TFL	Int	Yds	Avg	Lng	TD	PD	FF	Fum	FR	Yds	TD
2024	LAR	12	0	2	2	0	0.0	0	0	0	0.0	0	0	0	0	0	0	0	0
2025	NE	**15**	0	**12**	**10**	**2**	0.0	0	0	0	0.0	0	0	**1**	0	0	0	0	0
2026	NE	1	0	1	1	0	0.0	0	**1**	0	0.0	0	0	0	0	0	0	0	0
Career		28	0	15	13	2	0.0	0	1	0	0.0	0	0	1	0	0	0	0	0

=== Postseason ===
Year	Team	Games		Tackles					Interceptions						Fumbles				
Year	Team	GP	GS	Cmb	Solo	Ast	Sck	TFL	Int	Yds	Avg	Lng	TD	PD	FF	Fum	FR	Yds	TD
2025	NE	4	0	3	2	1	0.0	0	0	0	0.0	0	0	0	0	0	0	0	0
Career		4	0	3	2	1	0.0	0	0	0	0.0	0	0	0	0	0	0	0	0
