= Elijah Ponder =

American football player (born 2002)

No. 91 – New England Patriots
- Position: Outside linebacker
- Roster status: Active

Personal information
- Born: August 24, 2002 (age 24); Pomona, California, U.S.
- Listed height: 6 ft 3 in (1.91 m)
- Listed weight: 261 lb (118 kg)

Career information
- High school: Bishop Amat (La Puente, California)
- College: Cal Poly (2021–2024)
- NFL draft: 2025: undrafted

Career history
- New England Patriots (2025–present)

Awards and highlights
- FCS All-American (2023); 2× First-team All-Big Sky (2023, 2024)

Career NFL statistics as of Week 7, 2026
- Total tackles: 46
- Sacks: 9.5
- Forced fumbles: 1
- Fumble recoveries: 4
- Defensive touchdowns: 1
- Stats at Pro Football Reference

Elijah Coltrane Ponder (born August 24, 2002) is an American professional football outside linebacker for the New England Patriots of the National Football League (NFL). He played college football for the Cal Poly Mustangs.

== Early life ==
Ponder graduated from Bishop Amat High in La Puente, California.

== College career ==
Ponder played for Cal Poly, collecting 27 sacks and blocking a field goal attempt and an extra point try while a Mustang. He scored one touchdown, a 75-yard interception return versus San Diego in 2021. He earned two first-team All-Big Sky selections in his career, in 2023 and 2024. Ponder was additionally named a 2023 Walter Camp FCS All-American.

He recorded a sack and two passes defensed in the 2025 East–West Shrine Bowl.

== Professional career ==
Pre-draft measurables
Height	Weight	Arm length	Hand span	Wingspan	40-yard dash	10-yard split	20-yard split	20-yard shuttle	Three-cone drill	Vertical jump	Broad jump	Bench press
6 ft 2 7/8 in (1.90 m)	251 lb (114 kg)	33 1/8 in (0.84 m)	10 1/8 in (0.26 m)	6 ft 8 in (2.03 m)	4.63 s	1.56 s	2.63 s	4.28 s	6.99 s	41.0 in (1.04 m)	11 ft 0 in (3.35 m)	22 reps
All values from Pro Day

At his pro day, Ponder compiled a relative athletic score of 9.70, featuring a vertical jump of 41 inches, a broad jump of 11 feet, and a 10-yard split time of 1.56 seconds.

Ponder signed as an undrafted free agent with New England in April 2025.

== NFL career statistics ==
=== Regular season ===
Year	Team	Games		Tackles					Interceptions						Fumbles				
Year	Team	GP	GS	Cmb	Solo	Ast	Sck	TFL	Int	Yds	Avg	Lng	TD	PD	FF	Fum	FR	Yds	TD
2025	NE	15	0	24	14	10	4.0	4	0	0	0.0	0	0	0	0	0	2	18	0
2026	NE	10	9	30	16	14	7.5	8	0	0	0.0	0	0	0	1	0	2	19	1
Career		25	9	54	30	24	11.5	12	0	0	0.0	0	0	0	1	0	4	37	1

=== Postseason ===
Year	Team	Games		Tackles					Interceptions						Fumbles				
Year	Team	GP	GS	Cmb	Solo	Ast	Sck	TFL	Int	Yds	Avg	Lng	TD	PD	FF	Fum	FR	Yds	TD
2025	NE	4	0	4	2	2	0.0	0	0	0	0.0	0	0	0	0	0	1	0	0
Career		4	0	4	2	2	0.0	0	0	0	0.0	0	0	0	0	0	1	0	0
