= Jack Westover =

American football player (born 1999)

No. 89 – Washington Commanders
- Position: Tight end
- Roster status: Practice squad

Personal information
- Born: June 9, 1999 (age 27); Snoqualmie, Washington, U.S.
- Listed height: 6 ft 2 in (1.88 m)
- Listed weight: 245 lb (111 kg)

Career information
- High school: Mount Si (Snoqualmie)
- College: Washington (2018–2023)
- NFL draft: 2024: undrafted

Career history
- Seattle Seahawks (2024)*; New England Patriots (2024–2025); Washington Commanders (2026–present)*
- * Offseason or practice squad member only
- Stats at Pro Football Reference

Jack Francis Westover (born June 9, 1999) is an American professional football tight end for the Washington Commanders of the National Football League (NFL). He played college football for the Washington Huskies.

== Early life ==
Westover grew up in Bellevue, Washington and attended O'Dea High School before transferring to Mount Si High School during his senior year. Westover only played two games of high school football where he brought in seven receptions for 93 yards and a touchdown before breaking his collarbone. Westover committed to play for the Washington Huskies as a walk-on.

== College career ==
In week one of the 2019 season, Westover hauled in his first career touchdown on a three-yard reception in a win over Arizona. Westover finished the 2019 season with three receptions for nine yards and a touchdown. In October of the 2020 season, Westover was put on scholarship by the Huskies. Westover finished the 2020 season with one reception for nine yards and five carries for 22 yards. In the 2021 season, Westover brought in six receptions for 56 yards and a touchdown, along with adding three yards on the ground. In 2022, Westover had a breakout season recording 31 receptions for 342 yards and a touchdown. In week one of the 2023 season, he had five receptions for 59 yards and a touchdown in a win over Boise State. In week three, he recorded four receptions for 37 yards and a career-high three touchdowns, as he helped the Huskies to a win over Michigan State.

== Professional career ==
Pre-draft measurables
Height	Weight	Arm length	Hand span	Wingspan	20-yard shuttle	Three-cone drill
6 ft 2 5/8 in (1.90 m)	243 lb (110 kg)	32 1/8 in (0.82 m)	9 1/8 in (0.23 m)	6 ft 5 1/8 in (1.96 m)	4.38 s	7.08 s
All values from NFL Combine/Pro Day

=== Seattle Seahawks ===
Westover signed with the Seattle Seahawks as an undrafted free agent on May 3, 2024. On August 30, he was waived from injured reserve with an injury settlement.

=== New England Patriots ===
On October 2, 2024, Westover signed with the New England Patriots practice squad. On November 24, Westover was elevated to the active roster for New England's Week 12 game against the Miami Dolphins. He was signed to the active roster on January 4, 2025.

In the 2025 season, Westover changed positions as an emergency fullback in order to replace injured rookie Brock Lampe, who had suffered a season ending injury during the offseason. As a fullback, Westover appeared in all 17 of the Patriots' regular season games with 2 starts. Westover was largely used as a blocker, recording one reception for no yards on two targets in the regular season and an additional reception for 8 yards in the postseason.

After the Patriots signed fullback Reggie Gilliam during free agency, Westover moved back to tight end during the 2026 offseason. On August 30, 2026, Westover was waived by the Patriots as a part of their final roster cuts.

=== Washington Commanders ===
On September 1, 2026, the Washington Commanders signed Westover to their practice squad.
