= K'Lavon Chaisson =

American football player (born 1999)

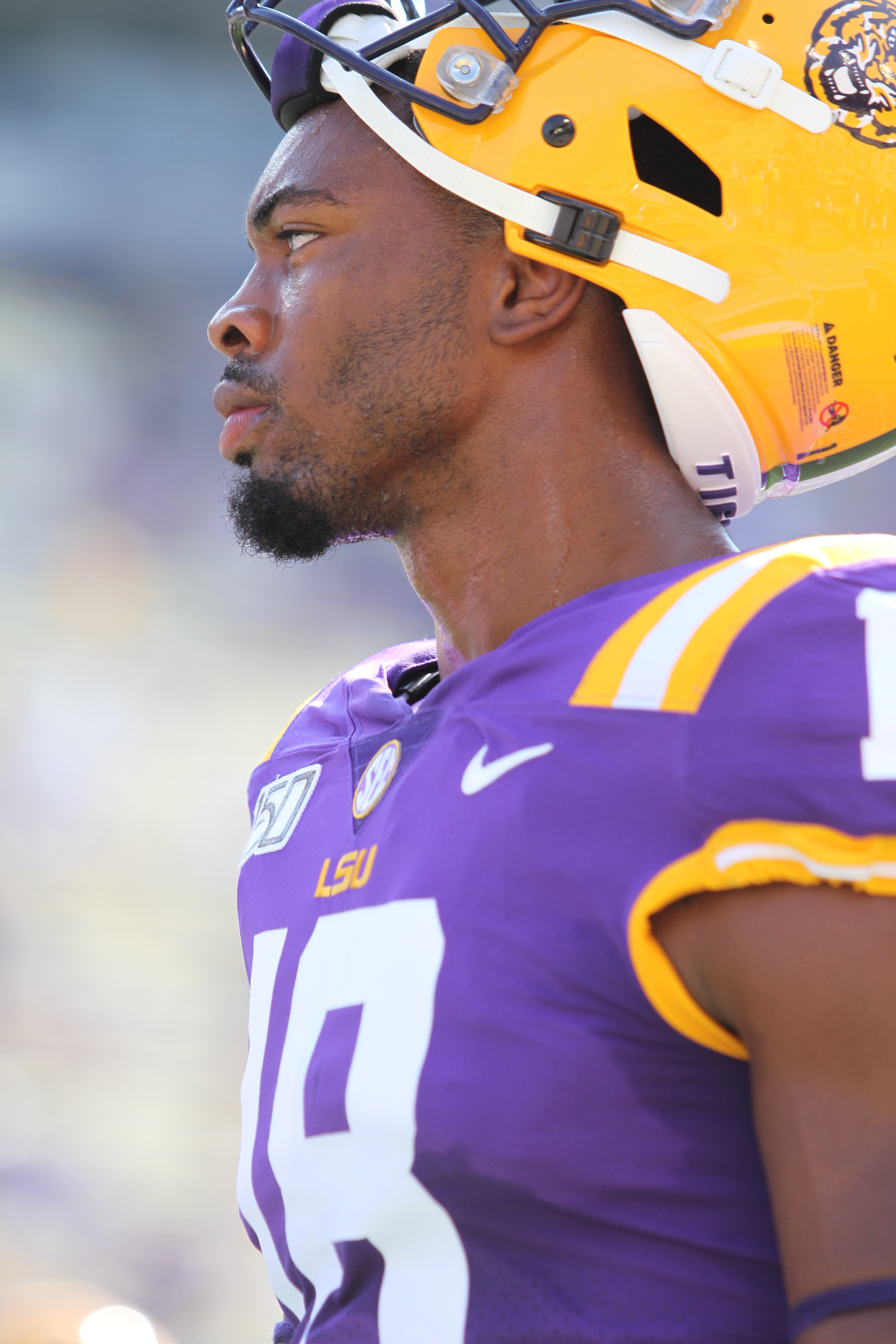
- Chaisson with the LSU Tigers in 2019

No. 45 – Washington Commanders
- Position: Outside linebacker
- Roster status: Active

Personal information
- Born: July 25, 1999 (age 27); Houston, Texas, U.S.
- Listed height: 6 ft 3 in (1.91 m)
- Listed weight: 255 lb (116 kg)

Career information
- High school: North Shore (Galena Park, Texas)
- College: LSU (2017–2019)
- NFL draft: 2020: 1st round, 20th overall pick

Career history
- Jacksonville Jaguars (2020–2023); Carolina Panthers (2024)*; Las Vegas Raiders (2024); New England Patriots (2025); Washington Commanders (2026−present)
- * Offseason or practice squad member only

Awards and highlights
- CFP national champion (2019); First-team All-SEC (2019)

Career NFL statistics as of 2025
- Tackles: 136
- Sacks: 17.5
- Forced fumbles: 3
- Fumble recoveries: 1
- Pass deflections: 6
- Interceptions: 1
- Touchdowns: 1
- Stats at Pro Football Reference

K'Lavon Chaisson (KAY-luv-vahn chase-ON; born July 25, 1999) is an American professional football outside linebacker for the Washington Commanders of the National Football League (NFL). Chaisson played college football for the LSU Tigers and was selected by the Jacksonville Jaguars in the first round of the 2020 NFL draft. He has also been a member of the Carolina Panthers, Las Vegas Raiders, and New England Patriots.

== Early life ==
Chaisson was born on July 25, 1999, in Houston, Texas, and later attended North Shore Senior High School. He quit playing football as a freshman in order to focus on basketball, but returned to football as a junior. He became an immediate starter at defensive end for the Mustangs, leading Texas high schoolers with 15.5 sacks along with 50 tackles, including 13 for loss, and forced three fumbles and helped lead North Shore to the Class 6A Division I state championship game and was named first-team All-State by the Associated Press. Chaisson was named the defensive MVP of the game after recording two sacks, four tackles for loss, a blocked kick and a forced fumble in the game and making a game-saving tackle at fourth and goal to preserve a 21–14 win over Todd Dodge's Westlake High School.

As a senior, Chaisson was named the 21-6A district defensive MVP as well as included on the Scout.com All-Midlands team and was invited to the 2017 Under Armour All-America Game. In the game he recorded six tackles, five of which were for loss, and tied the game's record with three sacks. Rated a five star recruit by Scout.com and four star by 247Sports, ESPN and Rivals, Chaisson committed to play college football at LSU over offers from Florida and Texas.

== College career ==
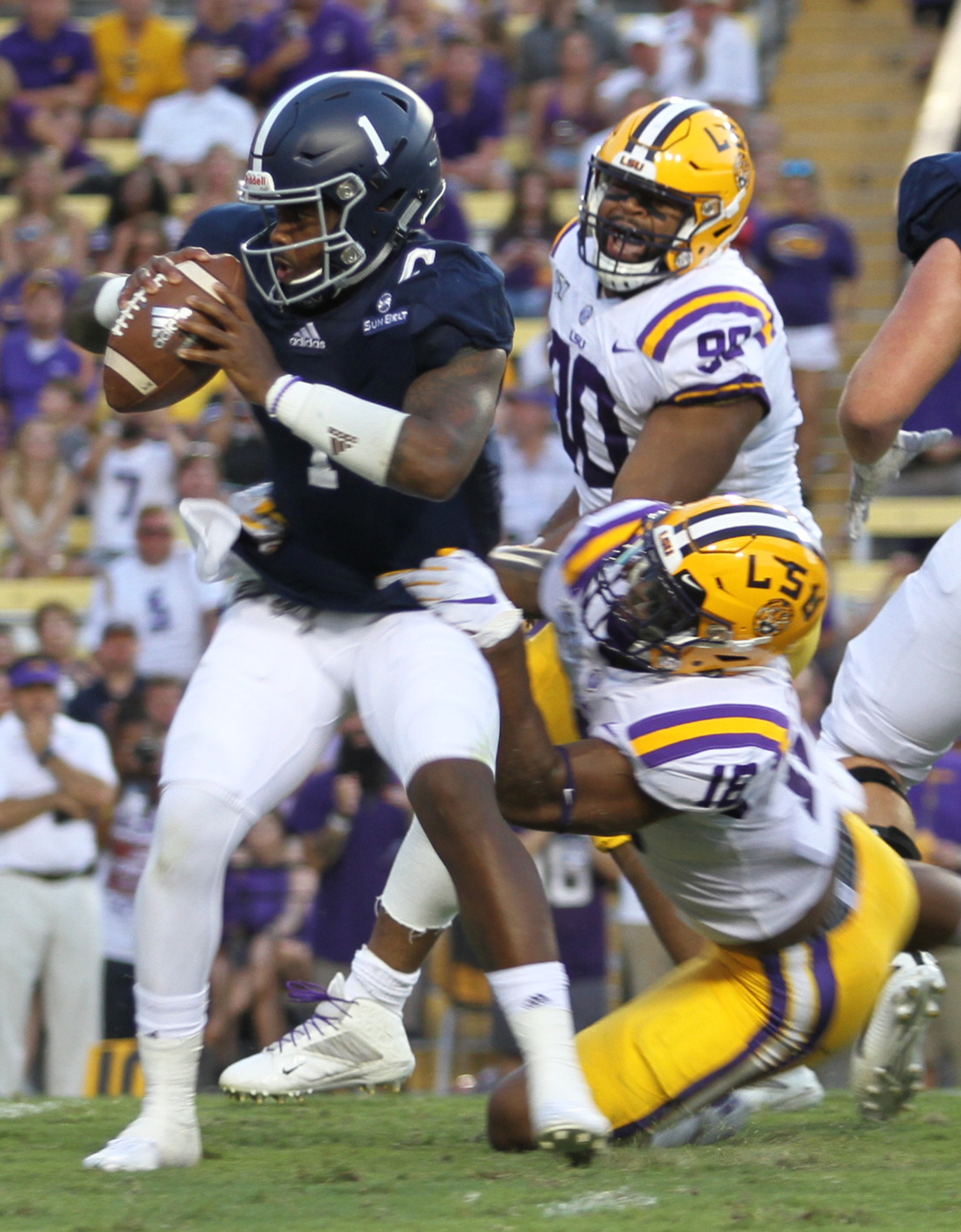
Chaisson sacking the quarterback of Georgia Southern in 2019

As a true freshman, Chaisson started the first game of the Tigers' season against BYU and recorded his first two career sacks in the next game during a 45–10 win over Chattanooga. He was named to the Southeastern Conference All-Freshman team after finishing the season with 27 tackles, two sacks, and 4.5 tackles for loss in 12 games played (three starts). Named a starter at outside linebacker going into his sophomore season, Chaisson made five tackles with a sack, a tackle for loss, and a quarterback hurry in the season opener against Miami before suffering a knee injury in the fourth quarter. He was diagnosed with a torn ACL the following day, ending his season and forcing him to use a medical redshirt.

Chaisson was chosen to wear the No. 18 Jersey by the Tigers' coaching staff going into his redshirt sophomore season. He finished the season with 60 tackles and led the team with 6.5 sacks, 13.5 tackles for loss, and six quarterback hurries along with two passes broken up and a forced fumble and was named first-team All-SEC. Chaisson was named the Defensive MVP of the 2019 Peach Bowl after a six-tackle, two-sack performance against Oklahoma. Chaisson had two tackles in LSU's 42–25 win over Clemson in the 2020 National Championship Game. On January 17, 2020, Chaisson announced that he would forgo his remaining two years of eligibility and enter the 2020 NFL draft. He finished his college career with 92 total tackles, including 19 for loss, 9.5 sacks, and 1 forced fumble.

== Professional career ==
Pre-draft measurables
| Height | Weight | Arm length | Hand span | Wingspan | Wonderlic |
|---|---|---|---|---|---|
| 6 ft 3 in (1.91 m) | 254 lb (115 kg) | 32 1/4 in (0.82 m) | 9 7/8 in (0.25 m) | 6 ft 7 1/4 in (2.01 m) | 27 |
All values from NFL Combine

=== Jacksonville Jaguars ===
Chaisson was selected with the 20th pick in the 2020 NFL draft by the Jacksonville Jaguars, using a pick previously acquired from the Los Angeles Rams in a trade for Jalen Ramsey. He made his debut in the 2020 season opener against the Indianapolis Colts, making two tackles. Chaisson recorded the first and only sack of the season in the following week against the Tennessee Titans.

On October 11, 2022, Chaisson was placed on injured reserve with a knee injury. He was activated on December 10.

On May 1, 2023, the Jaguars declined the fifth-year option of Chaisson's rookie contract, making him a free agent in the 2024 offseason.

=== Carolina Panthers ===
On March 16, 2024, Chaisson signed with the Carolina Panthers. He was released on September 3.

=== Las Vegas Raiders ===
On September 10, 2024, Chaisson signed with the Las Vegas Raiders practice squad. He was promoted to the active roster on October 5.

=== New England Patriots ===
On March 17, 2025, Chaisson signed a one-year, $5 million contract with the New England Patriots. In Week 7, Chaisson recorded two sacks, three tackles, two tackles for loss, and a fumble recovery returned for a touchdown (the first of his career) in a 31–13 win over the Tennessee Titans, earning AFC Defensive Player of the Week. In Week 16, Chaisson recorded three tackles, one tackle for a loss, and a game-sealing forced fumble on Zay Flowers in a 28–24 win over the Baltimore Ravens.

=== Washington Commanders ===
On March 13, 2026, Chaisson signed a one-year, $11 million contract with the Washington Commanders.

== NFL career statistics ==
Legend
| | Led the league |
| **Bold** | Career high |

=== Regular season ===
| Year | Team | Games | | Tackles | | | | | Fumbles | | | | Interceptions | | | | | |
| Year | Team | GP | GS | Cmb | Solo | Ast | Sck | TFL | FF | FR | Yds | TD | PD | Int | Yds | Avg | Lng | TD |
|---|---|---|---|---|---|---|---|---|---|---|---|---|---|---|---|---|---|---|
| 2020 | JAX | 16 | 3 | 19 | 12 | 7 | 1.0 | 3 | 0 | 0 | 0 | 0 | 1 | 0 | 0 | 0.0 | 0 | 0 |
| 2021 | JAX | 15 | 8 | 31 | **20** | 11 | 1.0 | 3 | 0 | 0 | 0 | 0 | 0 | 0 | 0 | 0.0 | 0 | 0 |
| 2022 | JAX | 9 | 0 | 10 | 7 | 3 | 1.0 | 1 | 0 | 0 | 0 | 0 | 0 | 0 | 0 | 0.0 | 0 | 0 |
| 2023 | JAX | 17 | 0 | 13 | 9 | 4 | 2.0 | 4 | 0 | 0 | 0 | 0 | 1 | 0 | 0 | 0.0 | 0 | 0 |
| 2024 | LV | 15 | 4 | **32** | 19 | **13** | 5.0 | 7 | 1 | 0 | 0 | 0 | **2** | **1** | 0 | 0.0 | 0 | 0 |
| 2025 | NE | 16 | 10 | 31 | 18 | **13** | **7.5** | **10** | **2** | **1** | **4** | **1** | **2** | 0 | 0 | 0.0 | 0 | 0 |
| Career | | 88 | 25 | 136 | 85 | 51 | 17.5 | 28 | 3 | 1 | 4 | 1 | 6 | 1 | 0 | 0 | 0 | 0 |

=== Postseason ===
| Year | Team | Games | | Tackles | | | | | Fumbles | | | | Interceptions | | | | | |
| Year | Team | GP | GS | Cmb | Solo | Ast | Sck | TFL | FF | FR | Yds | TD | PD | Int | Yds | Avg | Lng | TD |
|---|---|---|---|---|---|---|---|---|---|---|---|---|---|---|---|---|---|---|
| 2022 | JAX | 2 | 0 | 3 | 1 | 2 | 0.0 | 0 | 0 | 0 | 0 | 0 | 0 | 0 | 0 | 0.0 | 0 | 0 |
| 2025 | NE | 4 | 2 | **12** | **7** | **5** | **3.0** | **4** | **1** | 0 | 0 | 0 | **1** | 0 | 0 | 0.0 | 0 | 0 |
| Career | | 6 | 2 | 15 | 8 | 7 | 3.0 | 4 | 1 | 0 | 0 | 0 | 1 | 0 | 0 | 0 | 0 | 0 |

== Personal life ==
Chaisson's father, Kelvin Chaisson, played linebacker for the Baylor Bears. His father was shot and killed in November 2014.
