= Mehki Butler =

American football player (born 2001)

Orlando Storm
- Position: Guard
- Roster status: Unsigned draft pick

Personal information
- Born: April 3, 2001 (age 25); Omaha, Nebraska, U.S.
- Listed height: 6 ft 3 in (1.91 m)
- Listed weight: 310 lb (141 kg)

Career information
- High school: Omaha North (Omaha)
- College: Iowa Western (2019–2020); Arkansas State (2021–2024)
- NFL draft: 2025: undrafted

Career history
- New England Patriots (2025)*; Orlando Storm (2027-present)
- * Offseason or practice squad member only
- Stats at Pro Football Reference

Mehki Butler (born April 3, 2001) is an American professional football guard. He played college football for the Iowa Western Reivers and the Arkansas State Red Wolves.

== College career ==
Butler played college football for the Iowa Western Reivers from 2019 to 2020 and the Arkansas State Red Wolves from 2021 to 2024. He played for two seasons at Iowa Western and was named a National Junior College Athletic Association first-team All-American in 2020. In 2021, he transferred to Arkansas State, where he played 38 games in four seasons, mostly at left guard.

== Professional career ==
Pre-draft measurables
Height	Weight	Arm length	Hand span	Wingspan	40-yard dash	10-yard split	20-yard split	20-yard shuttle	Three-cone drill	Vertical jump	Broad jump	Bench press
6 ft 3 in (1.91 m)	310 lb (141 kg)	34 5/8 in (0.88 m)	9 3/4 in (0.25 m)	6 ft 10 1/8 in (2.09 m)	5.19 s	1.80 s	2.92 s	4.94 s	8.02 s	27.5 in (0.70 m)	8 ft 5 in (2.57 m)	22 reps
All values from Pro Day

After not being selected in the 2025 NFL draft, Butler signed with the New England Patriots as an undrafted free agent. He was released on August 26, 2025, as part of final roster cut downs. Butler signed to the practice squad the following day. On September 11, he was released by the team. Butler re-signed to the practice squad on December 8.

On February 11, 2026, Butler signed a reserve/futures contract with New England.On August 30, Butler was released by the Patriots as a part of final roster cuts.
