= Isaiah Iton =

American football player (born 2001)

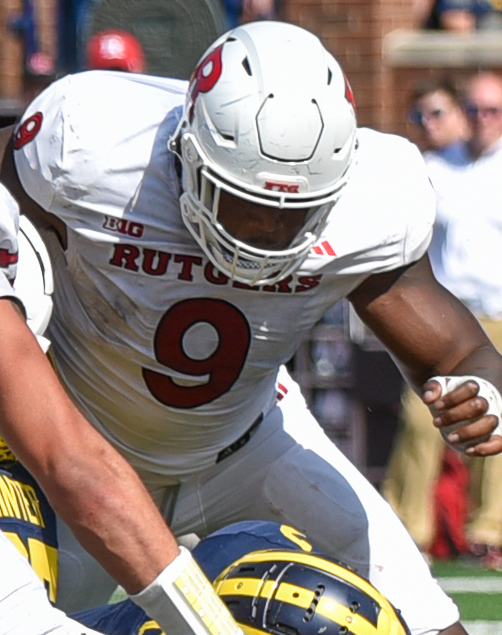
- Iton with Rutgers in 2023

Profile
- Position: Defensive tackle

Personal information
- Born: August 23, 2001 (age 25); Brooklyn, New York, U.S.
- Listed height: 6 ft 2 in (1.88 m)
- Listed weight: 277 lb (126 kg)

Career information
- High school: Pearland (Pearland, Texas)
- College: Northern Colorado (2019); Hutchinson CC (2020); Ole Miss (2021–2022); Rutgers (2023)
- NFL draft: 2024: undrafted

Career history
- Tennessee Titans (2024)*; New England Patriots (2025)
- * Offseason or practice squad member only
- Stats at Pro Football Reference

Isaiah Iton (born August 23, 2001) is an American professional football defensive end. He played college football for the Ole Miss Rebels before transferring to the Rutgers Scarlet Knights in 2023. He was signed by the Tennessee Titans as an undrafted free agent in 2024.

== College career ==
Iton attended Pearland High School and played football there. After playing for the Northern Colorado Bears in his freshman season, he transferred from Hutchinson Community College to play college football for the Ole Miss Rebels in 2020. He played as a rotational defensive lineman for his sophomore and junior seasons, making 24 total tackles and 3 tackles for loss. In 2023, he transferred to Rutgers as a senior where he saw significantly more playing time, starting all 13 games at defensive tackle, making 38 tackles, one sacks, and a fumble recovery.

== Professional career ==
Pre-draft measurables
Height	Weight	Arm length	Hand span	Wingspan	20-yard shuttle	Vertical jump	Broad jump	Bench press
6 ft 2 1/2 in (1.89 m)	277 lb (126 kg)	34 in (0.86 m)	10 1/8 in (0.26 m)	6 ft 10 3/4 in (2.10 m)	4.84 s	32.5 in (0.83 m)	9 ft 3 in (2.82 m)	29 reps
All values from Pro Day

=== Tennessee Titans ===
Iton signed with the Tennessee Titans as an undrafted free agent on May 10, 2024. He was waived on August 27, and re-signed to the practice squad.

Iton signed a reserve/future contract with the Titans on January 6, 2025. On April 16, Iton was waived by the Titans.

=== New England Patriots ===
On May 12, 2025, Iton signed with the New England Patriots after attending the team's rookie minicamp. He was waived on August 18, reverting to the team's injured reserve after clearing waivers.

On July 20, 2026, Iton re-signed with the Patriots. He was waived/injured by New England on August 30.
