= Yasir Durant =

American football player (born 1998)

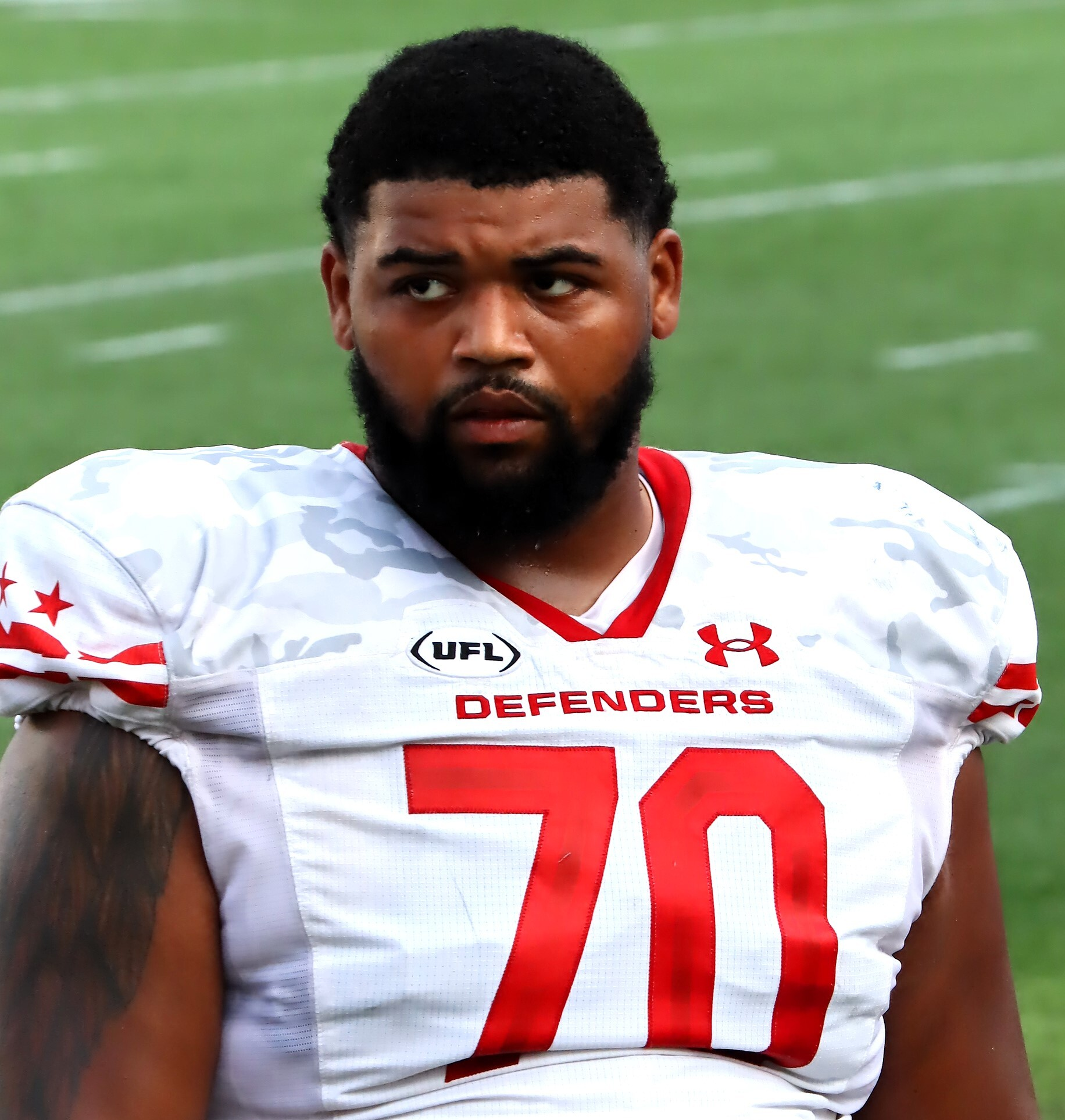
- Durant with the DC Defenders in 2025

No. 70 – DC Defenders
- Position: Offensive tackle
- Roster status: Active

Personal information
- Born: May 21, 1998 (age 28); Philadelphia, Pennsylvania, U.S.
- Listed height: 6 ft 6 in (1.98 m)
- Listed weight: 348 lb (158 kg)

Career information
- High school: Imhotep (Philadelphia)
- College: Arizona Western (2016); Missouri (2017–2019)
- NFL draft: 2020: undrafted

Career history
- Kansas City Chiefs (2020); New England Patriots (2021); New Orleans Saints (2022); Denver Broncos (2023)*; DC Defenders (2024–2025); New England Patriots (2025); DC Defenders (2026–present)
- * Offseason or practice squad member only

Awards and highlights
- UFL champion (2025); 2x All-UFL Team (2025, 2026)

Career NFL statistics as of 2024
- Games played: 19
- Games started: 2
- Stats at Pro Football Reference

Yasir Durant (pronounced YAH-seer; born May 21, 1998) is an American professional football offensive tackle for the DC Defenders of the United Football League (UFL). He played college football for the Missouri Tigers and signed with the Kansas City Chiefs as an undrafted free agent in 2020. He has also played for the New Orleans Saints, and the New England Patriots of the National Football League (NFL).

== College career ==
Durant played college football at the University of Missouri. Before transferring to Missouri, Durant played college football at Arizona Western College and signed with Missouri as the third ranked junior college prospect at his position. He started 33 of his 34 games with the Tigers.

== Professional career ==
Pre-draft measurables
Height	Weight	Arm length	Hand span	Wingspan	40-yard dash	10-yard split	20-yard split	Vertical jump	Bench press
6 ft 6 in (1.98 m)	331 lb (150 kg)	34 3/4 in (0.88 m)	9 1/2 in (0.24 m)	6 ft 10 3/4 in (2.10 m)	5.52 s	1.95 s	3.22 s	25.0 in (0.64 m)	21 reps
All values from NFL Combine

=== Kansas City Chiefs ===
Durant went undrafted in the 2020 NFL draft, a surprise to some analysts who had him projected as a third-round draft pick. He signed with the Kansas City Chiefs on April 30, 2020. Durant made the Chiefs final 53-man roster on September 5.

=== New England Patriots ===
The Kansas City Chiefs traded Durant to the New England Patriots for a 2022 seventh-round pick on September 1, 2021.

On August 30, 2022, Durant was waived by the Patriots.

=== New Orleans Saints ===
On September 20, 2022, Durant signed with the practice squad of the New Orleans Saints. He was promoted to the active roster on November 19, then waived two days later and re-signed back to the practice squad. He signed a reserve/future contract on January 9, 2023. On June 15, Durant was waived by the Saints.

=== Denver Broncos ===
On July 31, 2023, Durant signed with the Denver Broncos. He was waived by the Broncos five days later.

=== DC Defenders ===
On March 14, 2024, Durant signed with the DC Defenders of the United Football League (UFL). He re-signed with the Defenders on October 18. At the end of the 2025 season, Durant was named to the All-UFL Team.

=== New England Patriots (second stint) ===
On June 23, 2025, Durant signed with the New England Patriots. He was placed on injured reserve on July 31, where he spent the entirety of the 2025 NFL season.

=== DC Defenders (second stint) ===
On April 1, 2026, Durant re-signed with the DC Defenders.
