= Miles Battle =

American football player (born 2000)

DC Defenders
- Position: Cornerback
- Roster status: Unsigned draft pick

Personal information
- Born: January 4, 2000 (age 26); Houston, Texas, U.S.
- Listed height: 6 ft 3 in (1.91 m)
- Listed weight: 204 lb (93 kg)

Career information
- High school: Cypress Creek (Houston, Texas)
- College: Ole Miss (2018–2022); Utah (2023)
- NFL draft: 2024: undrafted

Career history
- Kansas City Chiefs (2024)*; New England Patriots (2024–2025); Miami Dolphins (2026)*; DC Defenders (2027-present)
- * Offseason or practice squad member only

Career NFL statistics as of 2025
- Total tackles: 5
- Pass deflections: 3
- Stats at Pro Football Reference

Miles Christopher Battle (born January 4, 2000) is an American professional football cornerback. He played college football for the Ole Miss Rebels and Utah Utes.

== Early life ==
Battle grew up in Houston, Texas, and attended Cypress Creek High School, where he lettered in football and basketball. In his high school career, Battle played as a wide receiver and completed 140 receptions for 2,036 yards and 29 touchdowns, averaging in 14.5 yards per game. Battle would also complete a total of 2,426 all purpose yards, averaging 115.5 yards per game. Battle was a four-star rated recruit and originally decided to play college football at the University of Oregon but would later decommit and later commit to play at the University of Mississippi.

== College career ==
=== Ole Miss ===
During Battle's true freshman season in 2018, he appeared in four games and was redshirted. He finished the season with two receptions for 18 yards, averaging 9.0 yards per game. After the season, he would enter the transfer portal but would later withdraw from it.

During the 2019 season, he appeared in 10 games as a wide receiver, finishing the season with two receptions for 20 yards, averaging 10.0 yards per game. During the 2020 season, he appeared in six games, switching from a wide receiver to a defensive back five games into the season. He finished the season with six solo tackles and four pass breakups. During the 2021 season, he appeared in all 13 games and started one of them at cornerback, finishing the season with three receptions for 22 yards, averaging 7.3 yards per game. He also made 22 total tackles (nine solo and 13 assisted), one interception for nine yards, eight pass breakups and a fumble recovery. During the 2022 season, he appeared in all 13 games and started three of them at cornerback, finishing the season with 38 total tackles (24 solo and 14 assisted), 0.5 tackles for loss, one interception for 10 yards, four pass breakups and a forced fumble.

On August 12, 2022, Battle announced that he would enter the transfer portal for the second time.

=== Utah ===
On December 30, 2022, Battle announced that he would transfer to Utah.

During the 2023 season, he appeared in all 13 games and started two of them at cornerback, finishing the season with 32 total tackles (23 solo and nine assisted), 0.5 tackles for loss, one interception for 24 yards and three pass breakups.

On December 27, 2023, Battle announced that he would declare for the 2024 NFL draft.

== Professional career ==
Pre-draft measurables
Height	Weight	Arm length	Hand span	Wingspan	40-yard dash	10-yard split	20-yard split	20-yard shuttle	Three-cone drill	Vertical jump	Broad jump	Bench press
6 ft 3 1/4 in (1.91 m)	196 lb (89 kg)	32 1/8 in (0.82 m)	8 3/8 in (0.21 m)	6 ft 6 1/2 in (1.99 m)	4.37 s	1.60 s	2.58 s	4.03 s	6.84 s	37 in (0.94 m)	10 ft 7 in (3.23 m)	12 reps
All values from Pro Day

=== Kansas City Chiefs ===
Battle was signed by the Kansas City Chiefs as an undrafted free agent after the 2024 NFL draft. He was also selected by the San Antonio Brahmas in the fourth round of the 2024 UFL draft on July 17. Battle was waived by the Chiefs on August 26.

=== New England Patriots ===
On October 15, 2024, Battle was signed to the practice squad of the New England Patriots He was promoted to the active roster on January 4, 2025.

On August 26, 2025, Battle was released by the Patriots as part of final roster cuts, and re-signed to the practice squad. He was signed to the active roster on November 26. Battle was released on December 29, and was subsequently re-signed to the practice squad. On January 8, 2026, he was released, and was re-signed to the practice squad.

=== Miami Dolphins ===
On February 11, 2026, Battle signed a reserve/futures contract with the Miami Dolphins. On August 30, he was waived by Miami as a part of final roster cuts.
