= Julian Ashby =

American football player (born 2002)

No. 47 – New England Patriots
- Position: Long snapper
- Roster status: Active

Personal information
- Born: July 8, 2002 (age 24); Atlanta, Georgia, U.S.
- Listed height: 6 ft 1 in (1.85 m)
- Listed weight: 231 lb (105 kg)

Career information
- High school: Parkview (Lilburn, Georgia)
- College: Furman (2020–2023); Vanderbilt (2024)
- NFL draft: 2025: 7th round, 251st overall pick

Career history
- New England Patriots (2025–present)

Awards and highlights
- First-team FCS All-American (2023)

Career NFL statistics as of Week 8, 2026
- Games played: 25
- Total tackles: 4
- Stats at Pro Football Reference

Frederick Julian Ashby II (born July 8, 2002) is an American professional football long snapper for the New England Patriots of the National Football League (NFL). He played college football for the Furman Paladins and Vanderbilt Commodores. He was selected by the Patriots in the seventh round of the 2025 NFL draft.

== Early life ==
Ashby was born on July 8, 2002, in Atlanta, Georgia. His father played college tennis and his uncle, Richard, played professionally on the ATP Tour. He attended Parkview High School in Lilburn, Georgia, where he played football, beginning as a quarterback before switching to long snapper. He appeared in 39 games as a long snapper and helped Parkview to a 12–2 record with a state playoff semifinals appearance as a senior. At Parkview, Ashby also played soccer as a goalkeeper. He signed to play college football for the NCAA Division I FCS-level Furman Paladins.

== College career ==
Ashby served as the starting long snapper for the Paladins from 2020 to 2023. He appeared in seven games in 2020, 11 games in 2021, and 13 games in both 2022 and 2023. As a senior in 2023, he helped the team to a record of 10–3 with a Southern Conference championship and an appearance in the quarterfinals of the FCS playoffs. Ashby was named a first-team FCS All-American for his performance in the 2023 season. At Furman, he majored in physics and had a grade point average (GPA) of 3.97, the highest on the football team. He transferred to the Vanderbilt Commodores for his final season, 2024, and appeared in 13 games. He was a semifinalist for the Patrick Mannelly Award as best long snapper nationally and recorded two tackles during the season.

== Professional career ==
Pre-draft measurables
Height	Weight	Arm length	Hand span	40-yard dash	10-yard split	20-yard split	Vertical jump	Broad jump	Bench press
6 ft 1 1/8 in (1.86 m)	231 lb (105 kg)	32 3/8 in (0.82 m)	10 1/8 in (0.26 m)	4.94 s	1.56 s	2.81 s	30.0 in (0.76 m)	9 ft 7 in (2.92 m)	15 reps
All values from Pro Day

Ashby was selected by the New England Patriots in the seventh round (251st overall) of the 2025 NFL draft, being the only long snapper drafted. He was the first long snapper and the first Vanderbilt player drafted since 2021.
