= Brock Lampe =

American football player (born 2003)

No. 45 – Buffalo Bills
- Position: Fullback
- Roster status: Practice squad

Personal information
- Born: March 31, 2003 (age 23); Kenosha, Wisconsin, U.S.
- Listed height: 6 ft 1 in (1.85 m)
- Listed weight: 249 lb (113 kg)

Career information
- High school: Bradford (Kenosha, Wisconsin)
- College: Northern Illinois (2021–2024)
- NFL draft: 2025: undrafted

Career history
- New England Patriots (2025); Seattle Seahawks (2026)*; Buffalo Bills (2026–present)*
- * Offseason or practice squad member only
- Stats at Pro Football Reference

Brock Lampe (born March 31, 2003) is an American professional football fullback for the Buffalo Bills of the National Football League (NFL). He played college football for the Northern Illinois Huskies.

== College career ==
Lampe played college football as a fullback for the Northern Illinois Huskies between 2021 and 2024. He finished his college career with 20 rushing attempts for 66 yards and two rushing touchdowns and 18 receptions for 216 receiving yards and one receiving touchdown.

== Professional career ==
Pre-draft measurables
Height	Weight	Arm length	Hand span	Wingspan	20-yard shuttle	Three-cone drill	Vertical jump	Broad jump	Bench press
6 ft 1 in (1.85 m)	244 lb (111 kg)	31 in (0.79 m)	8 7/8 in (0.23 m)	6 ft 2 1/2 in (1.89 m)	4.40 s	7.43 s	34.0 in (0.86 m)	9 ft 4 in (2.84 m)	22 reps
All values from Pro Day

=== New England Patriots ===
Lampe signed with the New England Patriots as an undrafted free agent after the 2025 NFL draft on May 9, 2025. He was placed on injured reserve on July 29.

On July 22, 2026, Lampe was released by the Patriots just before the start of training camp.

=== Seattle Seahawks ===
On August 6, 2026, Lampe signed with the Seattle Seahawks. He was waived/injured by Seattle on August 30.

=== Buffalo Bills ===
On September 14, 2026, Lampe signed with the Buffalo Bills' practice squad.
