= 2026 New England Patriots season =

67th season in franchise history

- Owner: Robert Kraft
- General manager: Eliot Wolf (de facto)
- President: Jonathan Kraft
- Head coach: Mike Vrabel
- Offensive coordinator: Josh McDaniels
- Defensive coordinator: Zak Kuhr
- Home stadium: Gillette Stadium

Results
- Record: 5–5
- Division place: 2nd AFC East

Uniform
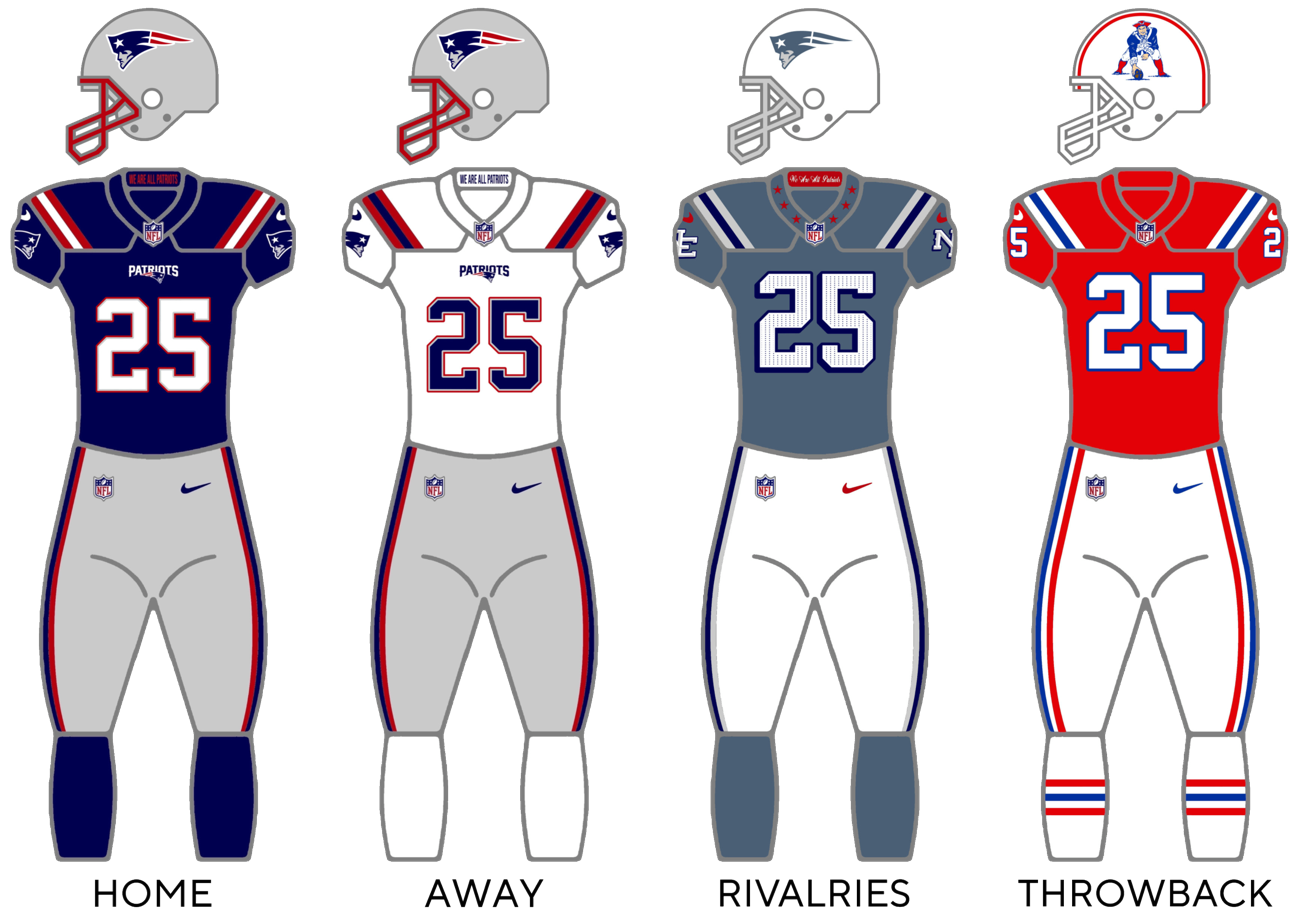

The 2026 season is the New England Patriots' 57th in the National Football League (NFL), their 67th overall, their third under de facto general manager Eliot Wolf and their second under head coach Mike Vrabel. With a Week 2 home win over the Pittsburgh Steelers, the Patriots became the first team originating in the American Football League to reach 600 lifetime wins. They failed to improve on their 14–3 record from the previous season following a week 7 loss to the Chicago Bears, and were guaranteed a worse record following a week 9 loss to the Green Bay Packers. During a week 10 loss to the Detroit Lions, starting quarterback Drake Maye fractured his fibula on the opening drive and is now out indefinitely.

== Roster changes ==
=== Free agency ===
==== Unrestricted ====
Position	Player	2026 team	Date signed	Contract
LB	K'Lavon Chaisson	Washington Commanders	March 13, 2026	1 year, $11 million
S	Jaylinn Hawkins	Baltimore Ravens	March 12, 2026	2 years, $10 million
TE	Austin Hooper	Atlanta Falcons	March 12, 2026	1 year, $3.25 million
OT	Vederian Lowe	San Francisco 49ers	March 12, 2026	2 years, $9.25 million
OT	Thayer Munford			
DT	Khyiris Tonga	Kansas City Chiefs	March 12, 2026	3 years, $21 million

==== Restricted ====
Position	Player	2026 team	Date signed	Contract
CB	Alex Austin	Miami Dolphins	March 12, 2026	1 year, $1.22 million
QB	Tommy DeVito	New England Patriots	March 6, 2026	2 years, $4.4 million
OT	Yasir Durant			
LB	Jack Gibbens	Arizona Cardinals	March 16, 2026	2 years, $7.5 million
DT	Jaquelin Roy			

==== Exclusive Rights ====
Position	Player	2026 team	Date signed	Contract
DT	Isaiah Iton	New England Patriots	July 20, 2026	1 year, $885,000
RB	Deneric Prince			
TE	Jack Westover	New England Patriots	April 21, 2026	1 year, $1.075 million

==== Signings/waiver claims ====
Position	Player	Previous team	Date signed	Contract
LB	Jesse Luketa	Los Angeles Rams	March 5, 2026	1 year, $1.145 million
S	Mike Brown	Tennessee Titans	March 12, 2026	1 year, $1.315 million
S	Kevin Byard	Chicago Bears	March 12, 2026	1 year, $7 million
WR	Romeo Doubs	Green Bay Packers	March 12, 2026	4 years, $68 million
FB	Reggie Gilliam	Buffalo Bills	March 12, 2026	3 years, $10.8 million
TE	Julian Hill	Miami Dolphins	March 12, 2026	3 years, $15 million
LB	Dre'Mont Jones	Baltimore Ravens	March 12, 2026	3 years, $36.5 million
OG	Alijah Vera-Tucker	New York Jets	March 12, 2026	3 years, $42 million
LB	K.J. Britt	Miami Dolphins	March 16, 2026	1 year, $1.4025 million
LS	Niko Lalos	New Orleans Saints	March 16, 2026	1 year, $1.005 million
OT	James Hudson	New York Giants	March 23, 2026	1 year, $1.4025 million
CB	Kindle Vildor	Tampa Bay Buccaneers	March 23, 2026	1 year, $1.4025 million
TE	Mitch Van Vooren	Cleveland Browns	July 22, 2026	1 year, $885,000
DT	Casey Rogers	New York Giants	August 3, 2026	1 year, $1.005 million
WR	Tejhaun Palmer	Arizona Cardinals	August 4, 2026	1 year, $885,000
LS	Niko Lalos	New Orleans Saints	August 10, 2026	1 year, $1.005 million
RB	Hassan Haskins	Los Angeles Chargers	August 12, 2026	1 year, $1.145 million
RB	JaMycal Hasty	Miami Dolphins	August 13, 2026	1 year, $1.215 million
OG	Darrian Dalcourt	Cleveland Browns	August 15, 2026	1 year, $885,000
C	Joe Michalski	Denver Broncos	August 15, 2026	1 year, $885,000
OG	Greg Van Roten	New York Giants	August 18, 2026	1 year, $3 million
OG	Jack Conley	Cleveland Browns	August 24, 2026	1 year, $885,000
P	Matt Haack	Washington Commanders	August 24, 2026	1 year, $1.3 million
TE	Cameron Latu	Philadelphia Eagles	August 31, 2026	1 year, $1.005 million
LB	Darius Muasau	New York Giants	August 31, 2026	2 years, $2.265 million
C	Ben Brown	New England Patriots	September 1, 2026	2 years, $3.84 million
DT	DaQuan Jones	Buffalo Bills	September 12, 2026	1 year, $3.5 million
OG	Matt Pryor	Arizona Cardinals	October 1, 2026	1 year, $1.3 million

=== Releases/waivers ===
Position	Player	Date released/waived
RB	Antonio Gibson	February 23, 2026
WR	Stefon Diggs	March 11, 2026
LB	Anfernee Jennings	March 11, 2026
LB	Jahlani Tavai	March 11, 2026
QB	Joshua Dobbs	March 23, 2026
WR	John Jiles	April 27, 2026
TE	Marshall Lang	April 27, 2026
RB	Elijah Mitchell	April 28, 2026
LS	Niko Lalos	May 20, 2026
DT	Travis Shaw	July 17, 2026
FB	Brock Lampe	July 22, 2026
OT	Sebastian Gutierrez	July 25, 2026
LB	Otis Reese	July 31, 2026
TE	Jeremiah Franklin	August 4, 2026
DT	David Blay Jr.	August 7, 2026
RB	Myles Montgomery	August 12, 2026
LS	Niko Lalos	August 15, 2026
TE	Mitch Van Vooren	August 18, 2026
CB	Kenneth Harris	August 24, 2026
WR	Kobe Prentice	August 24, 2026
RB	Hassan Haskins	August 29, 2026
LB	K.J. Britt	August 31, 2026
C	Ben Brown	August 31, 2026
P	Bryce Baringer	October 26, 2026
S	Elliott Davison	November 2, 2026
CB	Kindle Vildor	November 3, 2026

=== Trades ===
- March 11 – Center Garrett Bradbury was traded to the Chicago Bears in exchange for a 2027 fifth-round selection.
- April 7 – Linebacker Marte Mapu and a 2027 seventh-round selection were traded to the Houston Texans in exchange for a 2027 sixth-round selection.
- June 1 – A 2027 fifth-round selection and a 2028 first-round selection were traded to the Philadelphia Eagles in exchange for wide receiver A. J. Brown.
- August 10 – Tackle Caedan Wallace and a 2029 seventh-round selection were traded to the Miami Dolphins in exchange for a 2028 sixth-round selection.
- August 25 – Wide receiver Kayshon Boutte was traded to the Houston Texans in exchange for safety Jaylen Reed and a 2028 seventh-round selection.
- August 29 – A 2028 seventh-round selection was traded to the Arizona Cardinals in exchange for running back Corey Kiner.
- August 30 – A 2027 sixth-round selection was traded to the Minnesota Vikings in exchange for tackle Walter Rouse and a 2028 seventh-round selection.

=== Draft ===
2026 New England Patriots draft selections
Round	Selection	Player	Position	College	Notes
1	28	Caleb Lomu	OT	Utah	From Texans via Bills
2	55	Gabe Jacas	LB	Illinois	From Chargers
3	95	Eli Raridon	TE	Notre Dame	
5	171	Karon Prunty	CB	Wake Forest	
6	196	Dametrious Crownover	OT	Texas A&M	From Colts via Vikings, Panthers and Jaguars
6	212	Namdi Obiazor	LB	TCU	
7	234	Behren Morton	QB	Texas Tech	From Vikings
7	245	Jam Miller	RB	Alabama	From Rams via Texans and Jaguars
7	247	Quintayvious Hutchins	LB	Boston College	

2026 New England Patriots undrafted free agents
Name	Position	College	Ref.
Tanner Arkin	TE	Illinois	
David Blay Jr.	DT	Miami (FL)	
Channing Canada	CB	TCU	
Nick DeGennaro	WR	James Madison	
Kyle Dixon	WR	Culver–Stockton	
Cameron Dorner	WR	North Texas	
Kenneth Harris	CB	Oklahoma State	
Khalil Jacobs	LB	Missouri	
Jimmy Kibble	WR	Georgetown	
Myles Montgomery	RB	UCF	
JonDarius Morgan	OG	UAB	
Jacob Rizy	C	Florida State	
Xavier Holmes	LB	James Madison	
Peter Manuma	S	Hawaii	
Travis Shaw	DT	Texas	
Riley Wilson	LB	Arizona	
Jeremiah Franklin	TE	Boston College	
Kobe Prentice	WR	Baylor	
Eric Butler	S	San Diego State	
Erick Hunter	LB	Morgan State	

== Staff ==
New England Patriots staff
Front office: Chairman/CEO – Robert Kraft; President – Jonathan Kraft; Executive vice president of player personnel – Eliot Wolf; Vice president of player personnel – Ryan Cowden; Vice president of football administration – Matt Groh; Senior personnel executive – Alonzo Highsmith; Director of pro personnel – AJ Highsmith; Assistant director of pro personnel – Sam Fioroni; Director of college scouting – Tony Kinkela; Assistant director of college scouting – Matt Evans; Director of player development – James Mitchell; Director of research – Richard Miller; Director of football operations – Bobby Brown; Scouting administration coordinator – Courtney Weiner; Personnel coordinator – Brian Smith; Football operations and strategy: Vice president of football operations and strategy – John Streicher; Director of coaching analytics – Ekene Olekanma; Head coaches: Head coach – Mike Vrabel; Assistant head coach – Terrell Williams; Offensive coaches: Offensive coordinator – Josh McDaniels; Quarterbacks – Ashton Grant; Running backs – Tony Dews; Wide receivers – Todd Downing; Tight ends/passing game coordinator – Thomas Brown; Offensive line – Doug Marrone; Assistant offensive line – Jason Houghtaling; Offensive line assistant – Jonathan Decoster; Offensive analyst – Charles London; Offensive assistant – Chuckie Keeton; Offensive assistant – Riley Larkin	Defensive coaches: Defensive coordinator – Zak Kuhr; Defensive line – Clinton McMillan; Outside linebackers – Mike Smith; Inside linebackers – Vinny DePalma; Cornerbacks – Justin Hamilton; Secondary – Scott Booker; Defensive analyst – Shane Bowen; Defensive assistant – B.J. Edmonds; Defensive assistant – Kevin Richardson; Special teams coaches: Special teams coordinator – Jeremy Springer; Assistant special teams – Tom Quinn; Strength and conditioning: Director of sports performance – Frank Piraino; Strength and conditioning – Brandon Martuccio; Strength and conditioning – Deron Mayo; Strength and conditioning – Brian McDonough; → Coaching staff → Front office → More NFL staffs

== Current roster ==
New England Patriots roster
Quarterbacks (QB): 16 Tommy DeVito; 10 Drake Maye; 15 Behren Morton; Running backs (RB): 44 Reggie Gilliam FB; 9 Corey Kiner KR; 34 Lan Larison KR; 38 Rhamondre Stevenson; Wide receivers (WR): 1 A. J. Brown; 86 Efton Chism; 3 DeMario Douglas PR; 13 Mack Hollins; 18 Kyle Williams KR; Tight ends (TE): 85 Hunter Henry; 36 Cameron Latu; 82 Eli Raridon	Offensive linemen (OL): 77 Ben Brown LG; 52 Marcus Bryant LT; 66 Will Campbell LT; 68 Dametrious Crownover LT; 74 Caleb Lomu RT; 76 Morgan Moses RT; 65 Matt Pryor RG; 72 Walter Rouse G; 70 Greg Van Roten G; 55 Jared Wilson C; Defensive linemen (DL): 90 Christian Barmore DT; 94 Cory Durden NT; 92 Joshua Farmer DE; 99 DaQuan Jones NT; 93 Leonard Taylor III DT; 97 Milton Williams DE	Linebackers (LB): 53 Christian Elliss MLB; 49 Erick Hunter MLB; 50 Gabe Jacas OLB; 5 Dre'Mont Jones OLB; 54 Darius Muasau MLB; 48 Namdi Obiazor MLB; 91 Elijah Ponder OLB; 14 Robert Spillane MLB; Defensive backs (DB): 33 Mike Brown SS; 31 Kevin Byard FS; 29 Channing Canada CB; 7 Carlton Davis CB; 0 Christian Gonzalez CB; 25 Marcus Jones CB/PR; 21 Karon Prunty CB; 23 Jaylen Reed FS; 41 Brenden Schooler FS; 22 Charles Woods CB; 4 Craig Woodson SS; Special teams (ST): 47 Julian Ashby LS; 8 Andy Borregales K; 19 Mitch Wishnowsky P	Practice squad: 84 Tanner Arkin TE; 81 Chandler Brayboy WR; 80 Tanner Conner TE; 27 Elliott Davison FS; 83 Kyle Dixon WR; 95 Eric Gregory DT; 30 Al'zillion Hamilton CB; 58 Xavier Holmes OLB; 26 Terrell Jennings RB; 61 Lorenz Metz T (IPP); 11 Ryan Miller WR; 35 Elias Neal MLB; 64 Xavier Newman-Johnson C; 98 Jeremiah Pharms Jr. DT; 67 Andrew Rupcich G; 28 Kindle Vildor CB; 42 Benton Whitley OLB; Reserve: 87 Romeo Doubs WR (IR); 32 TreVeyon Henderson RB (IR); 80 Julian Hill TE (IR); 45 Quintayvious Hutchins OLB (IR); 59 Khalil Jacobs MLB (IR); 2 Harold Landry OLB (PUP); 39 Myles Montgomery RB (IR); 71 Mike Onwenu G (IR); 24 Dell Pettus SS (IR); 75 Alijah Vera-Tucker G (IR) 53 active, 16 practice squad (1 IPP), 10 reserve As of November 14, 2026. Rookies in italics.; Roster; Depth chart; Transactions

== Preseason ==
Week	Date	Opponent	Result	Record	Venue	Recap
1	August 13	Indianapolis Colts	T 13–13	0–0–1	Gillette Stadium	Recap
2	August 22	Philadelphia Eagles	W 24–21	1–0–1	Gillette Stadium	Recap
3	August 27	at Cleveland Browns	L 13–37	1–1–1	Huntington Bank Field	Recap

== Regular season ==
=== Schedule ===
Week	Date	Time (ET)	Opponent	Result	Record	Venue	Network	Recap
1	September 9	8:20 p.m.	at Seattle Seahawks	**L** 10–13	0–1	Lumen Field	NBC	Recap
2	September 20	1:00 p.m.	Pittsburgh Steelers	**W** 20–3	1–1	Gillette Stadium	CBS	Recap
3	September 27	1:00 p.m.	at Jacksonville Jaguars	**L** 6–35	1–2	EverBank Stadium	CBS	Recap
4	October 4	1:00 p.m.	at **Buffalo Bills**	**W** 29–26	2–2	Highmark Stadium	CBS	Recap
5	October 11	1:00 p.m.	Las Vegas Raiders	**W** 45–17	3–2	Gillette Stadium	CBS	Recap
6	October 18	1:00 p.m.	**New York Jets**	**W** 26–19	4–2	Gillette Stadium	CBS	Recap
7	October 22	8:15 p.m.	at Chicago Bears	**L** 24–30	4–3	Soldier Field	Prime Video	Recap
8	November 1	4:25 p.m.	at **Miami Dolphins**	**W** 24–19	5–3	Hard Rock Stadium	CBS	Recap
9	November 8	4:25 p.m.	Green Bay Packers	**L** 27–45	5–4	Gillette Stadium	Fox	Recap
10	November 15	9:30 a.m.	at Detroit Lions	**L** 10–35	5–5	(Germany) Allianz Arena (Munich)	Fox	Recap
11	Bye							
12	November 29	4:05 p.m.	at Los Angeles Chargers			SoFi Stadium	CBS	
13	December 6	4:25 p.m.	**Buffalo Bills**			Gillette Stadium	CBS	
14	December 10	8:15 p.m.	Minnesota Vikings			Gillette Stadium	Prime Video	
15	December 21	8:15 p.m.	at Kansas City Chiefs			Arrowhead Stadium	ESPN/ABC	
16	December 27	1:00 p.m.	at **New York Jets**			MetLife Stadium	CBS	
17	January 2/3/4	TBD	Denver Broncos			Gillette Stadium	TBD	
18	January 9/10	TBD	**Miami Dolphins**			Gillette Stadium	TBD	

Notes

- Intra-division opponents are in **bold** text.
- Networks, dates and times for games in Weeks 13, 15 and 16 are subject to change as a result of flexible scheduling.
- The date, time and network for Week 17 will be finalized by no later than the end of Week 15.
- The date, time and network for Week 18 will be finalized at the end of Week 17.

=== Game summaries ===
==== Week 1: at Seattle Seahawks ====
NFL Kickoff

Week 1: New England Patriots at Seattle Seahawks – Game summary

Quarter	1	2	3	4	Total
Patriots	0	7	3	0	**10**
**Seahawks**	0	0	3	10	**13**

at Lumen Field, Seattle, Washington

- Date: September 9
- Game time: 8:20 p.m. EDT/5:20 p.m. PDT
- Game weather: Sunny, 74 °F (23 °C)
- Game attendance: 68,744
- Referee: Adrian Hill
- TV announcers (NBC): Mike Tirico, Cris Collinsworth, Melissa Stark, and Kaylee Hartung
- Recap, Game Book

Game information

**First quarter**

- No scoring plays

**Second quarter**

- NE – Eli Raridon 2-yard pass from Drake Maye (Andy Borregales kick), 9:11. Patriots 7–0. **Drive: 10 plays, 77 yards, 5:37.**

**Third quarter**

- NE – Andy Borregales 50-yard field goal, 11:49. Patriots 10–0. **Drive: 8 plays, 39 yards, 3:11.**
- SEA – Jason Myers 30-yard field goal, 3:13. Patriots 10–3. **Drive: 7 plays, 31 yards, 3:40.**

**Fourth quarter**

- SEA – Jaxon Smith-Njigba 45-yard pass from Drew Lock (Jason Myers kick), 11:28. Tied 10–10. **Drive: 5 plays, 67 yards, 2:44.**
- SEA – Jason Myers 26-yard field goal, 5:50. Seahawks 13–10. **Drive: 8 plays, 39 yards, 3:30.**

**Top passers**

- NE – Drake Maye – 23/33, 178 yards, TD, 3 INT
- SEA – Drew Lock – 16/22, 187 yards, TD

**Top rushers**

- NE – Rhamondre Stevenson – 18 rushes, 51 yards
- SEA – Jadarian Price – 10 rushes, 52 yards

**Top receivers**

- NE – Mack Hollins – 4 receptions, 51 yards
- SEA – Jaxon Smith-Njigba – 8 receptions, 122 yards, TD

This game served as a rematch of Super Bowl LX and was the first NFL Kickoff Game that was a Super Bowl rematch since 2016, although Seahawks quarterback Sam Darnold was injured in his first possession and was replaced by Drew Lock. After securing a 10–0 lead early in the third quarter, the Patriots collapsed by allowing 13 unanswered points. The Patriots ultimately lost to the Seahawks for the fifth straight time, having last defeated them in Super Bowl XLIX. Consequently, they started their season with a record of 0–1 for the second consecutive year. It is also their first road loss since Mike Vrabel became head coach in 2025. It was the first time this occurred since Week 16 of the 2024 season, snapping a 9-game win streak.

==== Week 2: vs. Pittsburgh Steelers ====
Week 2: Pittsburgh Steelers at New England Patriots – Game summary

Quarter	1	2	3	4	Total
Steelers	0	3	0	0	**3**
**Patriots**	7	3	3	7	**20**

at Gillette Stadium, Foxborough, Massachusetts

- Date: September 20
- Game time: 1:00 p.m. EDT
- Game weather: Overcast, 63 °F (17 °C)
- Game attendance: 64,628
- Referee: Carl Cheffers
- TV announcers (CBS): Jim Nantz, J.J. Watt and Tracy Wolfson
- Recap, Game Book

Game information

**First quarter**

- NE – TreVeyon Henderson 39-yard run (Andy Borregales kick), 8:22. Patriots 7–0. **Drive: 4 plays, 49 yards, 1:55.**

**Second quarter**

- NE – Andy Borregales 30-yard field goal, 14:14. Patriots 10–0. **Drive: 9 plays, 41 yards, 4:56.**
- PIT – Chris Boswell 56-yard field goal, 0:00. Patriots 10–3. **Drive: 6 plays, 27 yards, 0:40.**

**Third quarter**

- NE – Andy Borregales 45-yard field goal, 0:43. Patriots 13–3. **Drive: 5 plays, 65 yards, 1:29.**

**Fourth quarter**

- NE – Elijah Ponder 19-yard fumble return (Andy Borregales kick), 13:37. Patriots 20–3.

**Top passers**

- PIT – Aaron Rodgers – 23/39, 187 yards, INT
- NE – Drake Maye – 14/22, 208 yards, INT

**Top rushers**

- PIT – Jaylen Warren – 11 rushes, 43 yards
- NE – TreVeyon Henderson – 16 rushes, 76 yards, TD

**Top receivers**

- PIT – Germie Bernard – 4 receptions, 35 yards
- NE – Romeo Doubs – 3 receptions, 96 yards

With the win, the Patriots improved to 1–1 for the third consecutive season. They also secured both their first home opening win since 2020, and their 600th win in franchise history.

==== Week 3: at Jacksonville Jaguars ====
Week 3: New England Patriots at Jacksonville Jaguars – Game summary

Quarter	1	2	3	4	Total
Patriots	0	3	0	3	**6**
**Jaguars**	0	14	14	7	**35**

at EverBank Stadium, Jacksonville, Florida

- Date: September 27
- Game time: 1:00 p.m. EDT
- Game weather: 80 °F (27 °C)
- Game attendance: 42,156
- Referee: Alex Kemp
- TV announcers (CBS): Spero Dedes, Adam Archuleta and Aditi Kinkhabwala
- Recap, Game Book

Game information

**First quarter**

- No scoring plays.

**Second quarter**

- JAX – Josh Cameron 12-yard pass from Trevor Lawrence (Cam Little kick), 13:25. Jaguars 7–0. **Drive: 10 plays, 62 yards, 5:27.**
- NE – Andy Borregales 35-yard field goal, 9:09. Jaguars 7–3. **Drive: 4 plays, 4 yards, 1:55.**
- JAX – Jakobi Meyers 10-yard pass from Trevor Lawrence (Cam Little kick), 4:23. Jaguars 14–3. **Drive: 9 plays, 65 yards, 4:46.**

**Third quarter**

- JAX – Parker Washington 17-yard pass from Trevor Lawrence (Cam Little kick), 1:08. Jaguars 21–3. **Drive: 15 plays, 72 yards, 8:42.**
- JAX – Chris Rodriguez Jr. 5-yard run (Cam Little kick), 0:50. Jaguars 28–3. **Drive: 1 play, 5 yards, 0:04.**

**Fourth quarter**

- NE – Andy Borregales 40-yard field goal, 13:17. Jaguars 28–6. **Drive: 9 plays, 69 yards, 2:33.**
- JAX – Bhayshul Tuten 1-yard run (Cam Little kick), 8:02. Jaguars 35–6. **Drive: 8 plays, 49 yards, 5:15.**

**Top passers**

- NE – Drake Maye – 14/25, 199 yards, 2 INT
- JAX – Trevor Lawrence – 19/29, 182 yards, 3 TD, INT

**Top rushers**

- NE – TreVeyon Henderson – 8 rushes, 23 yards
- JAX – Bhayshul Tuten – 15 rushes, 73 yards, TD

**Top receivers**

- NE – Mack Hollins – 6 receptions, 87 yards
- JAX – Jakobi Meyers – 7 receptions, 64 yards, TD

With an abysmal loss, New England fell to 1–2 for the sixth season in a row, marking their third road loss to the Jaguars since 2018. This also marked the first time since Week 18 of 2023 that the Patriots failed to score a touchdown.

==== Week 4: at Buffalo Bills ====
Week 4: New England Patriots at Buffalo Bills – Game summary

Quarter	1	2	3	4	Total
**Patriots**	7	7	7	8	**29**
Bills	0	17	0	9	**26**

at Highmark Stadium, Orchard Park, New York

- Date: October 4
- Game time: 1:00 p.m. EDT
- Game weather: Cloudy, 69 °F (21 °C)
- Game attendance: 60,606
- Referee: Bill Vinovich
- TV announcers (CBS): Ian Eagle, Ross Tucker and Evan Washburn
- Recap, Game Book

Game information

**First quarter**

- NE – Romeo Doubs 14-yard pass from Drake Maye (Andy Borregales kick), 7:01. Patriots 7–0. **Drive: 12 plays, 97 yards, 6:28.**

**Second quarter**

- BUF – James Cook 8-yard run (Tyler Bass kick), 14:15. Tied 7–7. **Drive: 13 plays, 62 yards, 7:46.**
- NE – Rhamondre Stevenson 1-yard run (Andy Borregales kick), 5:38. Patriots 14–7. **Drive: 6 plays, 63 yards, 2:43.**
- BUF – Josh Allen 2-yard run (Tyler Bass kick), 1:00. Tied 14–14. **Drive: 9 plays, 67 yards, 4:38.**
- BUF – Tyler Bass 27-yard field goal, 0:02. Bills 17–14. **Drive: 1 play, 0 yards, 0:03.**

**Third quarter**

- NE – Romeo Doubs 2-yard pass from Drake Maye (Andy Borregales kick), 8:15. Patriots 21–17. **Drive: 14 plays, 73 yards, 6:45.**

**Fourth quarter**

- BUF – Tyler Bass 38-yard field goal, 11:07. Patriots 21–20. **Drive: 10 plays, 60 yards, 4:40.**
- BUF – Keon Coleman 34-yard pass from Josh Allen (pass failed), 4:27. Bills 26–21. **Drive: 5 plays, 80 yards, 2:09.**
- NE – Efton Chism 23-yard pass from Drake Maye (Drake Maye–Rhamondre Stevenson pass), 1:50. Patriots 29–26. **Drive: 8 plays, 73 yards, 2:37.**

**Top passers**

- NE – Drake Maye – 22/37, 269 yards, 3 TD, INT
- BUF – Josh Allen – 23/33, 253 yards, TD, INT

**Top rushers**

- NE – Drake Maye – 8 rushes, 54 yards
- BUF – James Cook – 12 rushes, 75 yards, TD

**Top receivers**

- NE – Hunter Henry – 5 receptions, 62 yards
- BUF – Keon Coleman – 6 receptions, 116 yards, TD

This game marked both the Patriots' second consecutive road win against the Bills and 2–2 start to a season. They began 1–0 against the AFC East.

==== Week 5: vs. Las Vegas Raiders ====
Week 5: Las Vegas Raiders at New England Patriots – Game summary

Quarter	1	2	3	4	Total
Raiders	7	0	3	7	**17**
**Patriots**	14	7	14	10	**45**

at Gillette Stadium, Foxborough, Massachusetts

- Date: October 11
- Game time: 1:00 p.m. EDT
- Game weather: Cloudy, 55 °F (13 °C)
- Game attendance: 64,628
- Referee: Craig Wrolstad
- TV announcers (CBS): Kevin Harlan, Trent Green and Melanie Collins
- Recap, Game Book

Game information

**First quarter**

- NE – DeMario Douglas 35-yard pass from Drake Maye (Andy Borregales kick), 11:23. Patriots 7–0. **Drive: 5 plays, 79 yards, 2:33.**
- LV – Brock Bowers 13-yard pass from Kirk Cousins (Matt Gay kick), 8:19. Tied 7–7. **Drive: 6 plays, 80 yards, 3:04.**
- NE – Rhamondre Stevenson 5-yard run (Andy Borregales kick), 1:30. Patriots 14–7. **Drive: 11 plays, 84 yards, 6:49.**

**Second quarter**

- NE – Hunter Henry 11-yard pass from Drake Maye (Andy Borregales kick), 0:24. Patriots 21–7. **Drive: 5 plays, 61 yards, 1:28.**

**Third quarter**

- NE – Kyle Williams 34-yard pass from Drake Maye (Andy Borregales kick), 12:58. Patriots 28–7. **Drive: 4 plays, 68 yards, 2:02.**
- LV – Matt Gay 46-yard field goal, 8:30. Patriots 28–10. **Drive: 5 plays, 24 yards, 1:18.**
- NE – Drake Maye 3-yard run (Andy Borregales kick), 3:10. Patriots 35–10. **Drive: 9 plays, 71 yards, 5:20.**

**Fourth quarter**

- NE – Andy Borregales 29-yard field goal, 14:12. Patriots 38–10. **Drive: 7 plays, 57 yards, 2:43.**
- LV – Dylan Laube 2-yard run (Matt Gay kick), 10:49. Patriots 38–17. **Drive: 8 plays, 74 yards, 3:23.**
- NE – DeMario Douglas 8-yard pass from Drake Maye (Andy Borregales kick), 6:06. Patriots 45–17. **Drive: 8 plays, 44 yards, 4:43.**

**Top passers**

- LV – Kirk Cousins – 19/28, 243 yards, TD
- NE – Drake Maye – 26/34, 374 yards, 4 TD

**Top rushers**

- LV – Ashton Jeanty – 10 rushes, 27 yards
- NE – Rhamondre Stevenson – 13 rushes, 64 yards, TD

**Top receivers**

- LV – Brock Bowers – 8 receptions, 110 yards, TD
- NE – Kyle Williams – 3 receptions, 91 yards, TD

With their first win against the Raiders since 2020, the Patriots improved to 3–2 for the second consecutive season and avenged all three of their losses from the 2025 regular season. They also began 1–0 against the AFC West. In addition to this, it was also their highest-scoring game since Week 17 of the 2021 season.

==== Week 6: vs. New York Jets ====
Week 6: New York Jets at New England Patriots – Game summary

Quarter	1	2	3	4	Total
Jets	3	0	10	6	**19**
**Patriots**	7	10	0	9	**26**

at Gillette Stadium, Foxborough, Massachusetts

- Date: October 18
- Game time: 1:00 p.m. EDT
- Game weather: Sunny, 51 °F (11 °C)
- Game attendance: 64,628
- Referee: Clete Blakeman
- TV announcers (CBS): Spero Dedes, Adam Archuleta, and Aditi Kinkhabwala
- Recap, Game Book

Game information

**First quarter**

- NYJ – Jason Sanders 42-yard field goal, 8:17. Jets 3–0. **Drive: 13 plays, 48 yards, 6:43.**
- NE – Romeo Doubs 42-yard pass from Drake Maye (Andy Borregales kick), 4:10. Patriots 7–3. **Drive: 2 plays, 42 yards, 0:12.**

**Second quarter**

- NE – Andy Borregales 32-yard field goal, 1:46. Patriots 10–3. **Drive: 12 plays, 47 yards, 5:11.**
- NE – DeMario Douglas 9-yard pass from Drake Maye (Andy Borregales kick), 0:14. Patriots 17–3. **Drive: 7 plays, 71 yards, 1:09.**

**Third quarter**

- NYJ – Omar Cooper Jr. 48-yard pass from Geno Smith (Jason Sanders kick), 10:24. Patriots 17–10. **Drive: 3 plays, 60 yards, 1:24.**
- NYJ – Jason Sanders 36-yard field goal, 4:46. Patriots 17–13. **Drive: 6 plays, 18 yards, 3:24.**

**Fourth quarter**

- NE – Hunter Henry 7-yard pass from Drake Maye (kick failed), 14:10. Patriots 23–13. **Drive: 12 plays, 68 yards, 5:36.**
- NYJ – Jason Sanders 40-yard field goal, 7:20. Patriots 23–16. **Drive: 9 plays, 33 yards, 3:38.**
- NE – Andy Borregales 27-yard field goal, 1:12. Patriots 26–16. **Drive: 13 plays, 51 yards, 6:08.**

**Top passers**

- NYJ – Geno Smith – 20/30, 252 yards, TD, INT
- NE – Drake Maye – 18/32, 235 yards, 3 TD

**Top rushers**

- NYJ – Braelon Allen – 17 rushes, 78 yards
- NE – Corey Kiner – 11 rushes, 57 yards

**Top receivers**

- NYJ – Omar Cooper Jr. – 6 receptions, 103 yards, TD
- NE – DeMario Douglas – 7 receptions, 86 yards, TD

With their fourth straight win against the Jets, the Patriots improved to 4–2 for the second consecutive season. They also improved to 2–0 against the AFC East.

==== Week 7: at Chicago Bears ====
Week 7: New England Patriots at Chicago Bears – Game summary

Quarter	1	2	3	4	Total
Patriots	0	14	7	3	**24**
**Bears**	10	10	7	3	**30**

at Soldier Field, Chicago, Illinois

- Date: October 22
- Game time: 8:15 p.m. EDT/7:15 p.m. CDT
- Game weather: Clear, 61 °F (16 °C)
- Game attendance: 60,520
- Referee: Alan Eck
- TV announcers (WCVB/Prime Video): Al Michaels, Kirk Herbstreit, and Kaylee Hartung
- Recap, Game Book

Game information

**First quarter**

- CHI – Cairo Santos 43-yard field goal, 9:53. Bears 3–0. **Drive: 5 plays, 29 yards, 1:37.**
- CHI – D'Andre Swift 4-yard run (Cairo Santos kick), 1:59. Bears 10–0. **Drive: 6 plays, 67 yards, 2:13.**

**Second quarter**

- NE – Drake Maye 7-yard run (Andy Borregales kick), 11:33. Bears 10–7. **Drive: 9 plays, 74 yards, 5:05.**
- CHI – Cairo Santos 31-yard field goal, 7:04. Bears 13–7. **Drive: 9 plays, 30 yards, 4:29.**
- CHI – Luther Burden III 24-yard pass from Caleb Williams (Cairo Santos kick), 0:14. Bears 20–7. **Drive: 10 plays, 80 yards, 3:11.**
- NE – Rhamondre Stevenson 48-yard pass from Drake Maye (Andy Borregales kick), 0:00. Bears 20–14. **Drive: 2 plays, 66 yards, 0:14.**

**Third quarter**

- CHI – Colston Loveland 12-yard pass from Caleb Williams (Cairo Santos kick), 9:41. Bears 27–14. **Drive: 9 plays, 72 yards, 5:19.**
- NE – Eli Raridon 30-yard pass from Drake Maye (Andy Borregales kick), 3:46. Bears 27–21. **Drive: 9 plays, 80 yards, 5:55.**

**Fourth quarter**

- CHI – Cairo Santos 58-yard field goal, 1:34. Bears 30–21. **Drive: 12 plays, 51 yards, 4:48.**
- NE – Andy Borregales 47-yard field goal, 0:37. Bears 30–24. **Drive: 6 plays, 46 yards, 0:57.**

**Top passers**

- NE – Drake Maye – 24/31, 321 yards, 2 TD, INT
- CHI – Caleb Williams – 22/33, 308 yards, 2 TD

**Top rushers**

- NE – Drake Maye – 4 rushes, 26 yards, TD
- CHI – D'Andre Swift – 22 rushes, 78 yards, TD

**Top receivers**

- NE – Rhamondre Stevenson – 5 receptions, 93 yards, TD
- CHI – Luther Burden III – 4 receptions, 130 yards, TD

With the loss, the Patriots fell to 4–3 for the first time since 2012. They also began 0–1 against the NFC North.

This was the second most-watched Thursday Night Football game on Prime Video, with an average of 19.86 million viewers.

==== Week 8: at Miami Dolphins ====
Week 8: New England Patriots at Miami Dolphins – Game summary

Quarter	1	2	3	4	Total
**Patriots**	3	0	14	7	**24**
Dolphins	3	10	0	6	**19**

at Hard Rock Stadium, Miami Gardens, Florida

- Date: November 1
- Game time: 4:25 p.m. EST
- Game weather: Cloudy, 77 °F (25 °C)
- Game attendance: 59,023
- Referee: Alex Moore
- TV announcers (CBS): Andrew Catalon, Logan Ryan and Emily Proud
- Recap, Game Book

Game information

**First quarter**

- NE – Andy Borregales 34-yard field goal, 9:10. Patriots 3–0. **Drive: 8 plays, 35 yards, 3:31.**
- MIA – Zane Gonzalez 31-yard field goal, 3:39. Tied 3–3. **Drive: 4 plays, 6 yards, 2:09.**

**Second quarter**

- MIA – Zane Gonzalez 52-yard field goal, 9:27. Dolphins 6–3. **Drive: 12 plays, 55 yards, 6:53.**
- MIA – Malik Washington 1-yard pass from Malik Willis (Zane Gonzalez kick), 0:08. Dolphins 13–3. **Drive: 11 plays, 70 yards, 2:11.**

**Third quarter**

- NE – Kyle Williams 43-yard pass from Drake Maye (Andy Borregales kick), 9:23. Dolphins 13–10. **Drive: 11 plays, 70 yards, 2:11.**
- NE – Drake Maye 2-yard run (Andy Borregales kick), 0:59. Patriots 17–13. **Drive: 13 plays, 73 yards, 7:36.**

**Fourth quarter**

- NE – DeMario Douglas 48-yard pass from Drake Maye (Andy Borregales kick), 12:39. Patriots 24–13. **Drive: 2 plays, 53 yards, 0:52.**
- MIA – Kevin Coleman Jr. 35-yard pass from Malik Willis (pass failed), 2:04. Patriots 24–19. **Drive: 8 plays, 84 yards, 1:57.**

**Top passers**

- NE – Drake Maye – 16/20, 199 yards, 2 TD
- MIA – Malik Willis – 21/32, 211 yards, 2 TD, INT

**Top rushers**

- NE – Rhamondre Stevenson – 19 rushes, 82 yards
- MIA – Ollie Gordon II – 19 rushes, 69 yards

**Top receivers**

- NE – DeMario Douglas – 3 receptions, 76 yards, TD
- MIA – Kevin Coleman Jr. – 3 receptions, 46 yards, TD

With their third straight win against the Dolphins, the Patriots improved to 5–3 for the first time since 2012. They also improved to 3–0 against the AFC East.

==== Week 9: vs. Green Bay Packers ====
Week 9: Green Bay Packers at New England Patriots – Game summary

Quarter	1	2	3	4	Total
**Packers**	14	10	18	3	**45**
Patriots	0	14	7	6	**27**

at Gillette Stadium, Foxborough, Massachusetts

- Date: November 8
- Game time: 4:25 p.m. EST
- Game weather: Clear, 52 °F (11 °C)
- Game attendance: 64,628
- Referee: Alex Kemp
- TV announcers (Fox): Kevin Burkhardt, Tom Brady, Erin Andrews and Tom Rinaldi
- Recap, Game Book

Game information

**First quarter**

- GB – Jordan Love 13-yard run (Trey Smack kick), 13:19. Packers 7–0. **Drive: 2 plays, 14 yards, 0:55.**
- GB – Matthew Golden 5-yard pass from Jordan Love (Trey Smack kick), 7:59. Packers 14–0. **Drive: 7 plays, 86 yards, 3:45.**

**Second quarter**

- GB – Trey Smack 41-yard field goal, 13:37. Packers 17–0. **Drive: 12 plays, 75 yards, 6:36.**
- NE – Rhamondre Stevenson 30-yard pass from Drake Maye (Andy Borregales kick), 9:23. Packers 17–7. **Drive: 5 plays, 68 yards, 1:44.**
- GB – Kaleb Johnson 2-yard run (Trey Smack kick), 4:45. Packers 24–7. **Drive: 3 plays, 69 yards, 0:53.**
- NE – Efton Chism III 8-yard pass from Drake Maye (Andy Borregales kick), 2:37. Packers 24–14. **Drive: 4 plays, 64 yards, 2:08.**

**Third quarter**

- GB – Savion Williams 10-yard pass from Jordan Love (Trey Smack kick), 10:51. Packers 31–14. **Drive: 7 plays, 70 yards, 4:09.**
- GB – Trey Smack 51-yard field goal, 5:13. Packers 34–14. **Drive: 7 plays, 45 yards, 3:31.**
- GB – Christian Watson 39-yard pass from Jordan Love (Jordan Love run), 4:10. Packers 42–14. **Drive: 1 play, 39 yards, 0:06.**
- NE – Mack Hollins 22-yard pass from Drake Maye (Andy Borregales kick), 1:11. Packers 42–21. **Drive: 7 plays, 77 yards, 2:59.**

**Fourth quarter**

- GB – Trey Smack 38-yard field goal, 11:51. Packers 45–21. **Drive: 7 plays, 58 yards, 4:20.**
- NE – Corey Kiner 4-yard run (pass failed), 3:54. Packers 45–27. **Drive: 8 plays, 57 yards, 3:02.**

**Top passers**

- GB – Jordan Love – 23/29, 372 yards, 3 TD
- NE – Drake Maye – 21/38, 299 yards, 3 TD, 3 INT

**Top rushers**

- GB – Kaleb Johnson – 14 rushes, 68 yards, TD
- NE – Corey Kiner – 8 rushes, 55 yards, TD

**Top receivers**

- GB – Christian Watson – 7 receptions, 171 yards, TD
- NE – DeMario Douglas – 5 receptions, 102 yards

This was Patriots legend Tom Brady's first game at Gillette Stadium as an NFL broadcaster. With their first home loss of the season, the Patriots fell to 5–4 for the first time since 2022. They also fell to 0–2 against the NFC North. To make matters worse, the 45 points scored by the Packers were also the most an opponent has ever scored at Gillette Stadium.

Former tight end Rob Gronkowski was inducted into the Patriots Hall of Fame the previous night.

==== Week 10: at Detroit Lions ====
NFL Germany games

Week 10: New England Patriots at Detroit Lions – Game summary

Quarter	1	2	3	4	Total
Patriots	3	0	0	7	**10**
**Lions**	7	14	7	7	**35**

at Allianz Arena, Munich, Germany

- Date: November 15
- Game time: 3:30 p.m. CET/9:30 a.m. EST
- Game weather: Cloudy, 52 °F (11 °C)
- Game attendance: 70,225
- Referee: Clay Martin
- TV announcers (Fox): Joe Davis, Greg Olsen and Pam Oliver
- Recap, Game Book

Game information

**First quarter**

- NE – Andy Borregales 33-yard field goal, 9:12. Patriots 3–0. **Drive: 11 plays, 60 yards, 5:48.**
- DET – Amon-Ra St. Brown 56-yard pass from Jared Goff (Jake Bates kick), 6:13. Lions 7–3. **Drive: 6 plays, 70 yards, 2:59.**

**Second quarter**

- DET – Isaac TeSlaa 12-yard pass from Jared Goff (Jake Bates kick), 12:57. Lions 14–3. **Drive: 11 plays, 97 yards, 5:28.**
- DET – Jahmyr Gibbs 5-yard run (Jake Bates kick), 2:06. Lions 21–3. **Drive: 7 plays, 84 yards, 2:53.**

**Third quarter**

- DET – Amon-Ra St. Brown 28-yard pass from Jared Goff (Jake Bates kick), 8:16. Lions 28–3. **Drive: 7 plays, 54 yards, 3:30.**

**Fourth quarter**

- NE – Lan Larison 10-yard pass from Tommy DeVito (Andy Borregales kick), 12:40. Lions 28–10. **Drive: 13 plays, 87 yards, 6:30.**
- DET – Jahmyr Gibbs 28-yard run (Jake Bates kick), 8:56. Lions 35–10. **Drive: 6 plays, 60 yards, 3:44.**

**Top passers**

- NE – Tommy DeVito – 12/24, 81 yards, TD, INT
- DET – Jared Goff – 20/31, 303 yards, 3 TD, 2 INT

**Top rushers**

- NE – Corey Kiner – 10 rushes, 25 yards
- DET – Jahmyr Gibbs – 22 rushes, 153 yards, 2 TD

**Top receivers**

- NE – Mack Hollins – 5 receptions, 48 yards
- DET – Jahmyr Gibbs – 7 receptions, 99 yards

During a promising opening drive, quarterback Drake Maye was ruled out of the game early with an ankle injury after being tackled by Aidan Hutchinson. From there, the team struggled to do anything on offense. With their first set of back-to-back losses since 2024, the Patriots fell to 5–5 for the first time since 2001. They also fell to 0–3 against the NFC North.

The following Friday, it was officially announced that Maye fractured his fibula and would be out indefinitely. He suffered no ligament damage, and therefore no surgery was required for the injury. A return towards the end of the regular season is said to be the best case scenario.

==== Week 12: at Los Angeles Chargers ====
Week 12: New England Patriots at Los Angeles Chargers – Game summary

Quarter	1	2	3	4	Total
Patriots	0	0	0	0	**0**
Chargers	0	0	0	0	**0**

at SoFi Stadium, Inglewood, California

- Date: November 29
- Game time: 4:05 p.m. EST/1:05 p.m. PST
- Game weather: TBD (fixed roof)
- TV announcers (CBS): Andrew Catalon, Logan Ryan and AJ Ross
- Preview

=== Standings ===
==== Division ====
AFC East
	W	L	T	PCT	DIV	CONF	PF	PA	STK
Buffalo Bills	8	1	0	.889	1–1	5–1	287	199	W5
New England Patriots	5	5	0	.500	3–0	5–1	221	242	L2
New York Jets	2	8	0	.200	0–3	2–5	194	254	L5
Miami Dolphins	1	8	0	.111	1–1	1–5	148	224	L3

==== Conference ====
AFC
Seed	Team	Division	W	L	T	PCT	DIV	CONF	SOS	SOV	STK
**Division leaders**
1	Buffalo Bills	East	8	1	0	.889	1–1	5–1	.460	.455	W5
2 (Note: Kansas City wins tie break over Jacksonville and Cincinnati based on conference record.) (Note: Kansas City wins tie break over Denver based on division record.)	Kansas City Chiefs	West	7	2	0	.778	3–1	6–1	.391	.309	W2
3 (Note: Jacksonville wins tie break over Cincinnati based on head-to-head victory.)	Jacksonville Jaguars	South	7	2	0	.778	2–1	6–2	.448	.412	W3
4	Cincinnati Bengals	North	7	2	0	.778	2–1	5–2	.417	.333	W5
**Wild cards**
5	Denver Broncos	West	7	2	0	.778	2–1	3–1	.583	.515	W5
6	Pittsburgh Steelers	North	6	3	0	.667	2–2	3–3	.494	.431	L1
7	Cleveland Browns	North	6	4	0	.600	2–1	4–3	.430	.393	W1
**In the hunt**
8	New England Patriots	East	5	5	0	.500	3–0	5–1	.574	.447	L2
9 (Note: Houston and Las Vegas win tie break over Baltimore based on conference record.) (Note: Houston wins tie break over Las Vegas based on strength of victory.)	Houston Texans	South	4	6	0	.400	3–1	4–4	.474	.316	W1
10	Las Vegas Raiders	West	4	6	0	.400	1–1	3–3	.500	.189	L2
11	Baltimore Ravens	North	4	6	0	.400	0–2	2–5	.453	.275	L5
12	Indianapolis Colts	South	3	8	0	.273	1–3	2–6	.471	.304	L1
13	New York Jets	East	2	8	0	.200	0–3	2–5	.553	.368	L5
14 (Note: LA Chargers and Miami win tie break over Tennessee based on conference record.) (Note: LA Chargers wins tie break over Miami based on strength of victory.)	Los Angeles Chargers	West	1	8	0	.111	0–3	1–5	.563	.400	W1
15	Miami Dolphins	East	1	8	0	.111	1–1	1–5	.581	.200	L3
16	Tennessee Titans	South	1	8	0	.111	1–2	1–6	.466	.273	L3
