= Super Bowl LX =

2026 National Football League championship game

Seattle Seahawks (1) (NFC) (14–3)	New England Patriots (2) (AFC) (14–3)
29	13
Head coach: Mike Macdonald	Head coach: Mike Vrabel
	1	2	3	4	Total
SEA	3	6	3	17	29
NE	0	0	0	13	13
- Date: February 8, 2026
- Kickoff time: 3:30 p.m. PT
- Stadium: Levi's Stadium; Santa Clara, California
- MVP: Kenneth Walker III, running back
- Favorite: Seahawks by 4.5
- Referee: Shawn Smith
- Attendance: 70,823

Ceremonies
- National anthem: Charlie Puth
- Coin toss: Joe Montana
- Halftime show: Bad Bunny featuring Lady Gaga and Ricky Martin

TV in the United States
- Network: TV: NBC; Telemundo (Spanish); Universo (Spanish); Streaming: Peacock; NFL+ NBC Sports Digital Platforms
- Announcers: Mike Tirico (play-by-play); Cris Collinsworth (analyst); Melissa Stark and Kaylee Hartung (sideline reporters); Terry McAulay (rules analyst)
- Nielsen ratings: 39.4 (national); U.S. TV viewership: 125.6 million
- Cost of 30-second commercial: $10 million

Radio in the United States
- Network: Westwood One
- Announcers: Kevin Harlan (play-by-play); Kurt Warner (analyst); Laura Okmin (sideline reporter); Gene Steratore (rules analyst)

Super Bowl LX was an American football game played to determine the champion of the National Football League (NFL) for the 2025 season. The National Football Conference (NFC) champion Seattle Seahawks defeated the American Football Conference (AFC) champion New England Patriots 29–13. The game took place on February 8, 2026, at Levi's Stadium in Santa Clara, California, the second Super Bowl held in the stadium and the third held in the San Francisco Bay Area.

The Seahawks' victory was their second, previously having won 2013's Super Bowl XLVIII during their Legion of Boom era. Led by their Dark Side defense, they were making their fourth appearance with a 14–3 record and the NFC's top seed. The Patriots, who finished with a 14–3 record and the AFC's second seed, extended their record of appearances to 12. They were seeking a record seventh title and their first since the Brady–Belichick era after last winning 2018's Super Bowl LIII. The two franchises previously met in Super Bowl XLIX, which was won by the Patriots.

Seattle scored the only points of the first three quarters, converting four field goals to take a 12–0 lead. In the fourth quarter, the Seahawks scored the first touchdown of the game before the Patriots responded with their own touchdown to cut the score to 19–7. A series of New England turnovers, however, allowed the Seahawks to score 10 consecutive points and put the game out of reach. With the loss, the Patriots became the first team to lose six Super Bowls. Running back Kenneth Walker III was named Super Bowl MVP after rushing for 135 yards and helping set up several of Seattle's field goals. He was the first running back to win the award since Terrell Davis in 1997's Super Bowl XXXII.

The game was broadcast on NBC and streamed on NBCUniversal's Peacock. It became NBC's most-watched program in its history at around 125 million viewers worldwide and peaked at around 137 million worldwide, a 2% (~2 million viewers) decline from Super Bowl LIX a year prior. Similarly, the Super Bowl LX halftime show headlined by Puerto Rican rapper Bad Bunny featuring Lady Gaga and Ricky Martin also represented a decline in viewership by 4% (~5 million viewers) at 128 million viewers. The game is considered one of the worst Super Bowls due to both teams' offensive struggles, although the performance of the Seahawks defense was praised.

== Background ==
=== Host selection ===
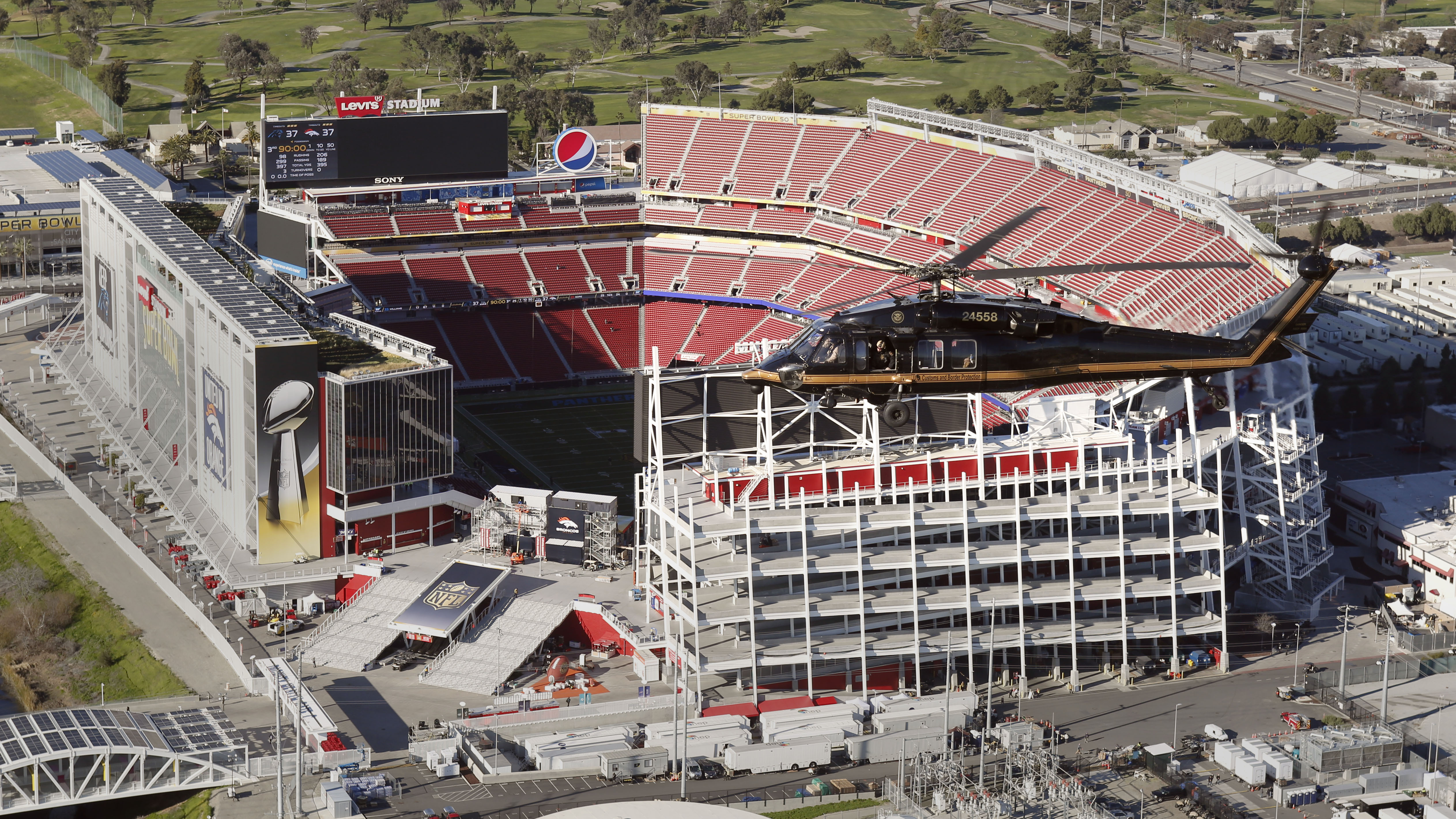
Levi's Stadium in Santa Clara, California, the venue of the game

The NFL has made all decisions regarding hosting sites since organizing Super Bowl LVII in 2022, at which point they removed the bidding process. The new process meant that potential hosts would put together a proposal, with the league owners then voting to determine viability. On May 22, 2023, the NFL announced that Super Bowl LX would be played at Levi's Stadium in Santa Clara, California, home of the San Francisco 49ers. This is the third Super Bowl in the San Francisco Bay Area and second at Levi's Stadium. Super Bowl XIX, played at Stanford Stadium in 1985, was won by San Francisco 49ers over the Miami Dolphins. More recently, Super Bowl 50, played at Levi's Stadium in 2016, featured the Denver Broncos defeating the Carolina Panthers.

=== Logo ===
As has been a tradition since Super Bowl LVI, the logo includes Roman numerals featuring imagery from the host city/region. For Super Bowl LX, the logo was revealed on February 9, 2025, in a social media post by game broadcaster NBC Sports following the conclusion of Super Bowl LIX, ahead of a formal unveiling at a post-game press conference in New Orleans the next day. The Roman numerals have a CMYK theme, incorporating Bay Area landmarks such as the San Francisco skyline, the Golden Gate Bridge, and redwood trees.

=== Super Bowl week events ===
The Super Bowl Experience was hosted at the Moscone Center in San Francisco. In October 2025, it was announced that the 2026 Pro Bowl Games would be held on the Tuesday prior to the Super Bowl, February 3, at the Moscone Center, downsizing the event and integrating it into the Super Bowl's festivities. This would be the final Pro Bowl, as the NFL announced the discontinuation of the Pro Bowl as an event in August 2026.

== Teams ==
=== Seattle Seahawks ===
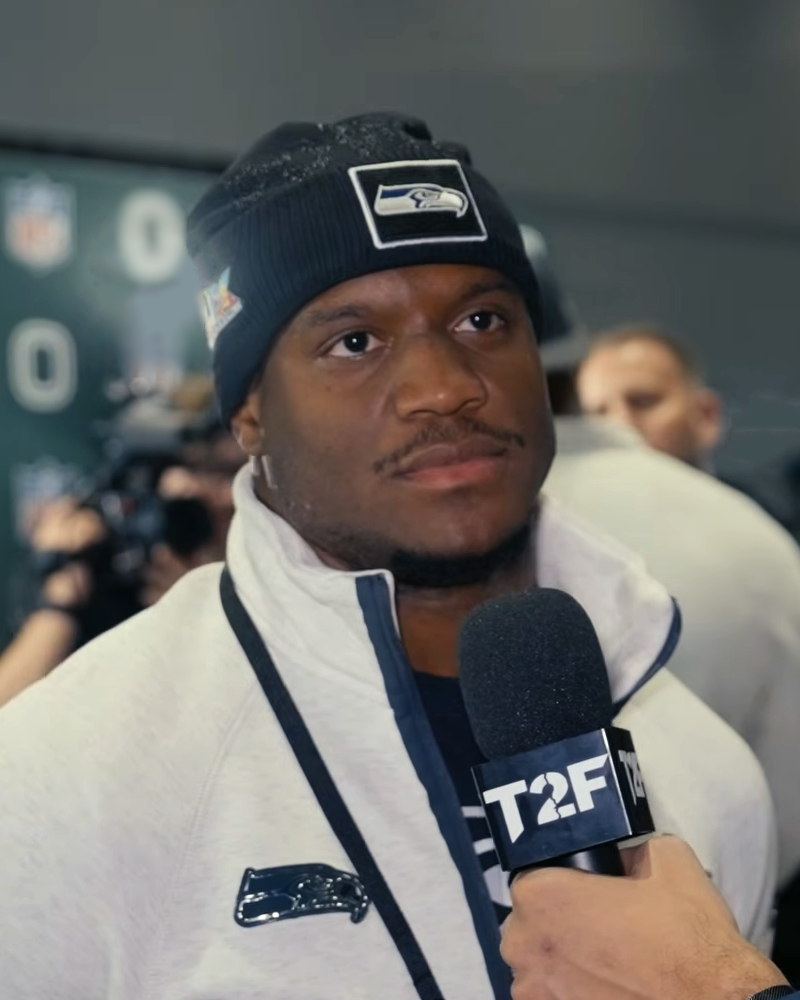
Kenneth Walker III led the Seahawks in rushing yards.

The Seattle Seahawks finished the 2025 season with a 14–3 record under second-year head coach Mike Macdonald. This was their fourth appearance, having last won 2013's Super Bowl XLVIII and last appeared in Super Bowl XLIX the following year, both during their Legion of Boom era.

Following back-to-back years of narrowly missing the playoffs, the Seahawks sought to retain two-time Pro Bowl quarterback Geno Smith for the 2025 season, but a contract dispute led to them trading Smith to the Las Vegas Raiders. The same day as Smith's trade, Seattle signed free agent quarterback Sam Darnold, who was coming off a breakout season with the Minnesota Vikings after seven years in the league. The Seahawks made further changes to the offense by parting ways with veteran wide receivers Tyler Lockett and DK Metcalf by release and a trade with the Pittsburgh Steelers, respectively. New wide receivers included Cooper Kupp, the 2021 Offensive Player of the Year and Super Bowl LVI MVP, who was signed in free agency after being released by the Los Angeles Rams. The day of the NFL trade deadline, the Seahawks acquired Pro Bowl wide receiver Rashid Shaheed from the New Orleans Saints. On defense, the Seahawks signed four-time Pro Bowl linebacker DeMarcus Lawrence in free agency after he missed most of the 2024 season with the Dallas Cowboys due to a foot injury.

Seattle's offense improved from 14th in yards and 18th in points to eighth in yards and third in points. Darnold received a second Pro Bowl selection after throwing for 4,048 yards and 25 touchdowns, along with having a career-high completion percentage of 67.7%, although he also led the league in fumbles at 11 and turnovers at 20. Wide receiver Jaxon Smith-Njigba was the league's receiving yards leader at 1,793, earning him Offensive Player of the Year, along with Pro Bowl and first-team All-Pro honors. He also led the team in receiving touchdowns at 10. The rushing game was led by running backs Kenneth Walker III, who was Seattle's leading rusher at 1,027 yards with five touchdowns, and Zach Charbonnet, who led the Seahawks in rushing touchdowns at 12 with 730 yards.

Known as the Dark Side, the Seahawks had the top scoring defense, previously ranking 12th, and were sixth in yards, previously ranking 14th. Earning both Pro Bowl and second-team All-Pro honors was defensive lineman Leonard Williams, who had 62 tackles. Williams and defensive tackle Byron Murphy II both led the team in sacks at 7.0 each, with Murphy adding another 62 tackles. Cornerback Devon Witherspoon also received Pro Bowl and second-team All-Pro honors after recording 72 tackles. Linebacker Ernest Jones was the team leader in tackles at 126 and interceptions at five, earning him a second-team All-Pro selection. Also named to the Pro Bowl was Lawrence, who had 53 tackles and 6.0 sacks. On special teams, Shaheed was the only player in the league to score both a kick return touchdown and a punt return touchdown, earning him Pro Bowl honors as a kick returner. Punter Michael Dickson, who had the sixth-longest punt average at 49.9, received a second-team All-Pro selection.

=== New England Patriots ===
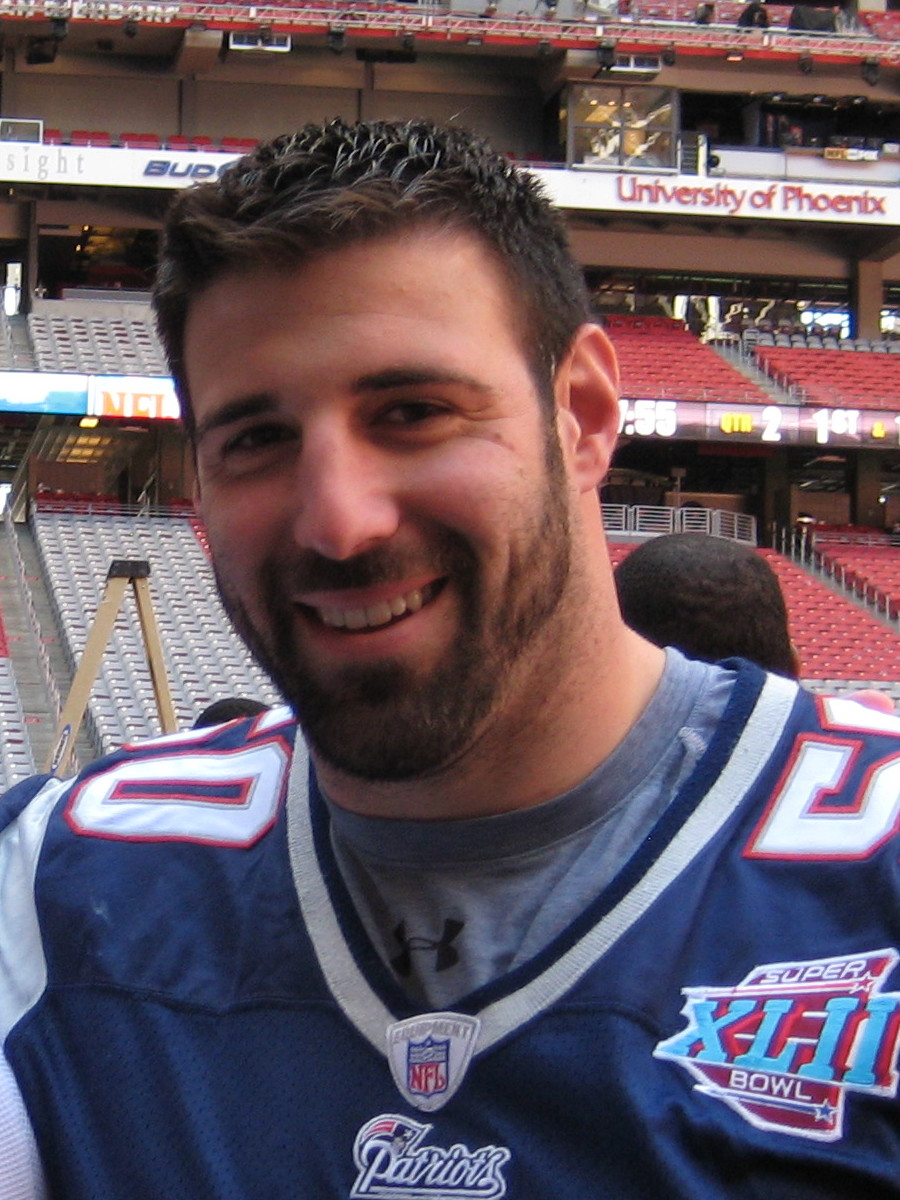
Mike Vrabel (depicted in 2008) won three Super Bowls with the Patriots as a player before becoming their head coach.

The New England Patriots finished the 2025 season with a 14–3 record under first-year head coach Mike Vrabel. This was their 12th appearance, extending their record for the most in NFL history. They won a record six Super Bowls (Note: Tied with the Pittsburgh Steelers.) during the franchise's dynasty under the leadership of quarterback Tom Brady and head coach Bill Belichick, concluding with a victory in 2018's Super Bowl LIII.

By 2025, the Patriots had regressed to one of the worst teams in the league, finishing the past two seasons with a 4–13 record at the bottom of the AFC East. During this period, they selected quarterback Drake Maye third overall in the 2024 NFL draft, who earned Pro Bowl honors as a rookie despite the team's struggles. Following coaching turnover, New England hired Vrabel, the 2021 Coach of the Year with the Tennessee Titans, who played for the Patriots when they won their first three Super Bowls. Josh McDaniels also rejoined the Patriots as offensive coordinator for the third time, previously holding the position from 2006 to 2008 and from 2012 to 2021. To help improve the offense, New England signed four-time Pro Bowl wide receiver Stefon Diggs, who was returning from an ACL injury he suffered the past year with the Houston Texans. New England also took running back TreVeyon Henderson in the second round of the 2025 NFL draft. Defensive acquisitions included linebacker Robert Spillane following a career season with the Las Vegas Raiders and linebacker Harold Landry after he was released by the Titans.

The season saw New England's offense go from 31st in yards and 30th in points to third in yards and second in points. Maye threw for 4,394 yards and 31 touchdowns, both of which led the AFC, while leading the league in completion percentage at 72% and passer rating at 113.5. He also rushed for 450 yards and four touchdowns. Maye received Pro Bowl and second-team All-Pro honors, in addition to placing second in Most Valuable Player voting. Diggs led the team in receiving yards at 1,013 and scored four receiving touchdowns. Tight end Hunter Henry scored seven receiving touchdowns, the most on the Patriots, while obtaining 768 receiving yards. Henderson was the team's leader in rushing yards and rushing touchdowns at 911 and nine, respectively. For his role in rebuilding the offense, McDaniels won Assistant Coach of the Year.

New England's defense went from 22nd in yards and points to eighth in yards and fourth in points. Named to the Pro Bowl was cornerback Christian Gonzalez with 69 tackles. Spillane led the team with 97 tackles while also recording two interceptions. Along with having 49 tackles, Landry was the team's leader in sacks at 8.5. Safety Jaylinn Hawkins led the Patriots in interceptions at four, in addition to having 71 tackles. Cornerback Marcus Jones, who had 65 tackles, earned second-team All-Pro honors as a punt returner after scoring two punt return touchdowns, the most in the league. Vrabel was named Coach of the Year a second time following the team's turnaround from the past two seasons.

=== Playoffs ===
The Seahawks, as the NFC's No. 1 seed, earned a bye in the Wild Card Round. Despite Darnold dealing with an injured oblique and losing Charbonnet to an ACL injury during the game, they won the Divisional Round in a 41–6 rout against their NFC West rival San Francisco 49ers. Seattle faced another divisional rival, the Los Angeles Rams, in the NFC Championship Game. After splitting two close contests in the regular season, including an overtime matchup, Seattle emerged victorious over the Rams in another one-score game, 31–27, to advance to their first Super Bowl in 11 years. With the victory, the Seahawks continued their streak of making the Super Bowl every year they held the NFC's top seed.

The Patriots, the AFC's No. 2 seed, defeated the Los Angeles Chargers 16–3 in the Wild Card Round, the team's first playoff win since 2018. In the Divisional Round against the Houston Texans, they recorded five turnovers, including four interceptions, to secure the 28–16 victory. The AFC Championship Game pitted the Patriots against the top seeded Denver Broncos, who were starting backup quarterback Jarrett Stidham after starter Bo Nix suffered an ankle injury in the previous round. Amid snow conditions, the Patriots won 10–7 to reach their 12th Super Bowl. Having won all eight of their regular season road games, the AFC Championship victory made the Patriots the first team to be undefeated in nine road games. They also became the first team to defeat three top five defenses in a single postseason.

=== Pre-game notes ===
The two franchises previously met in 2014's Super Bowl XLIX, in which the Patriots defeated the Seahawks 28–24. No players remained on either team since that Super Bowl, with McDaniels being the only coach to appear in both games. Seahawks' general manager John Schneider was executive vice president during Super Bowl XLIX and was promoted to president of football operations in 2024. Schneider became the first NFL general manager to reach a second Super Bowl with a completely different roster and head coach.

This was the first Super Bowl since Super Bowl XXXVIII to feature two teams that missed the playoffs the previous season. It was also the most unlikely Super Bowl matchup in at least 50 years based on preseason odds, with Seattle 60–1 to win the Super Bowl and New England 80–1.

At 23 years and 162 days of age, Maye was the second-youngest quarterback to start in a Super Bowl after Dan Marino, who was 23 years and 127 days old when he started in Super Bowl XIX.

As the designated home team in the annual rotation between the two conferences, the Patriots chose to wear white away jerseys and white pants. They were the first home team to wear white since the Tampa Bay Buccaneers in Super Bowl LV. The Seahawks donned navy blue home jerseys and navy blue pants. This marked the first time in which both Super Bowl participants wore monochromatic uniforms. In addition to the customary Super Bowl patch, the jerseys of both teams featured a USA 250 patch in recognition of the United States Semiquincentennial.

The Patriots held practice the week leading up to the game at Stanford University in Palo Alto. The Seahawks held practice at San Jose State University in San Jose.

Hall of Famers and Super Bowl-winning players Joe Montana, Peyton Manning, and Lynn Swann were honorary captains for the coin toss. The coin used was a modern restrike of a silver medal called the Libertas Americana, commissioned by Benjamin Franklin, also a tie-in to the United States Semiquincentennial.

== Game summary ==
=== First half ===
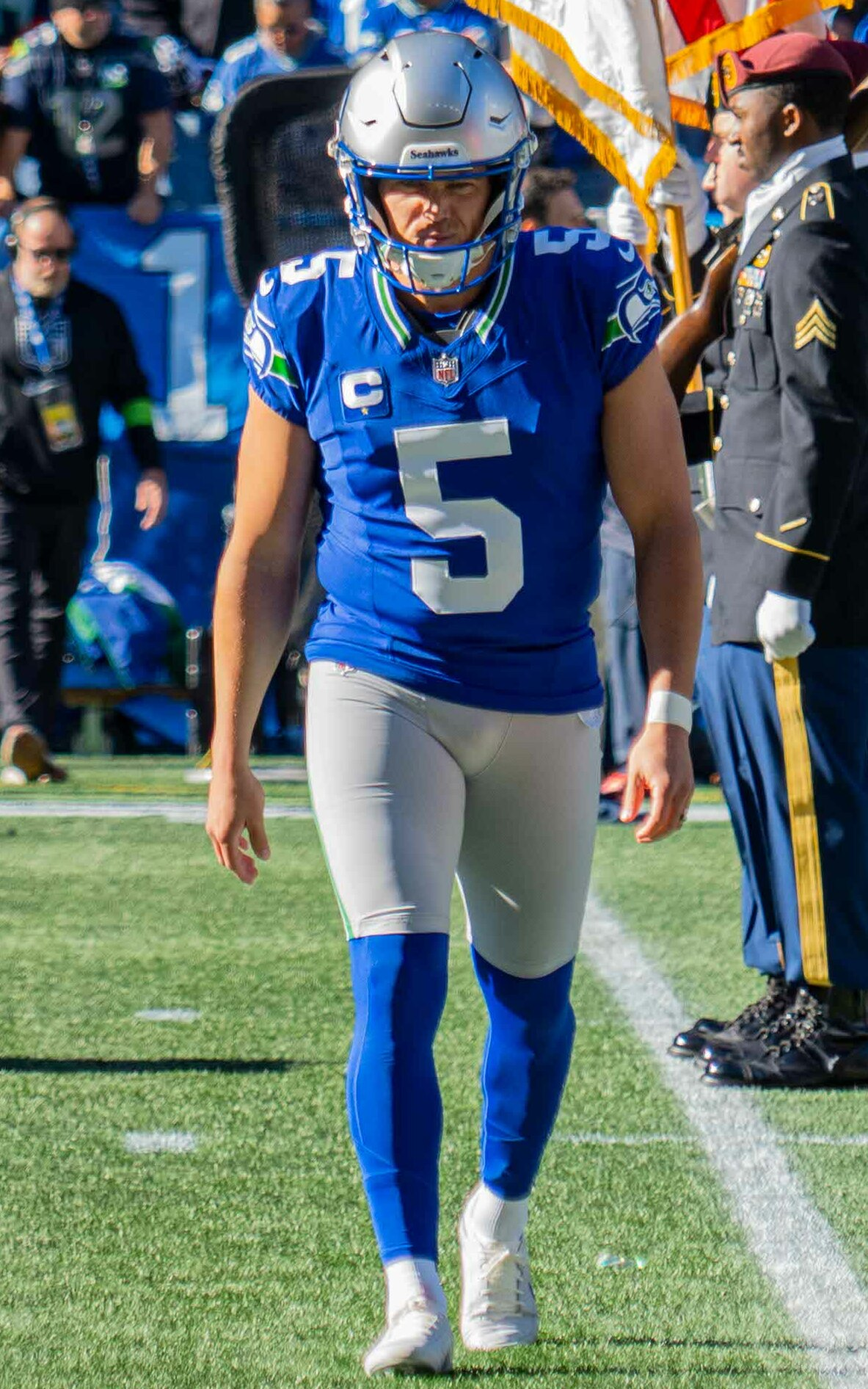
Seahawks kicker Jason Myers set the Super Bowl record for field goals scored.

The Patriots won the coin toss and deferred to the second half, meaning Seattle received the ball first. The Seahawks drove down the field inside the Patriots' 20-yard line, including a 23-yard pass to Cooper Kupp, but they failed to score a touchdown in the red zone, kicking a 33-yard field goal. The Patriots then began their first drive on the 28-yard line after running back D'Ernest Johnson returned Jason Myers's kickoff for 28 yards. While New England advanced to Seattle's 49-yard line, they were ultimately forced to punt shortly after quarterback Drake Maye was sacked by Derick Hall for a loss of 10 yards and could not convert on third and 11. After two straight drives by each team ended with punts, Jason Myers kicked a 39-yard field goal after Seattle drove down the field, powered by 30- and 29-yard runs by Kenneth Walker III. After three more drives ended with punts, Myers added another field goal from 41 yards with 11 seconds left in the first half.

=== Second half ===
In the third quarter, after the Patriots opened with a three-and-out, the Seahawks put together a 10-play, 69-yard drive that included a 20-yard pass to Walker and 16-yard passes to Jaxon Smith-Njigba and Rashid Shaheed; it ended with Myers kicking his fourth field goal from 41 yards to give the Seahawks a 12–0 lead. After four straight drives ended in punts, Maye was strip-sacked by Hall and the ball was recovered by Byron Murphy II at the New England's 37-yard line.

Following the turnover, the Seahawks converted on a third and 9 with a Darnold pass to Kupp as the fourth quarter began. Darnold threw the first touchdown pass of the game, a 16-yarder to Barner, extending Seattle's lead to 19–0. The Patriots' next drive was a three-play, 65-yard drive that included a 24-yard pass and a 35-yard touchdown pass to Mack Hollins, cutting the deficit to 19–7. The Seahawks' next drive started with an 11-yard pass from Darnold to Shaheed, but ended with a punt by Michael Dickson that was downed at New England's 4-yard line by Velus Jones Jr. Maye began with a 13-yard pass to Rhamondre Stevenson and a 16-yard run, but after throwing a 7-yard pass to rookie wide receiver Kyle Williams, he was intercepted by Seattle safety Julian Love, who returned the ball 35 yards to New England's 38-yard line. After Walker rushed for 24 yards on the next two plays, the Seahawks' drive stalled, and Myers kicked a record fifth field goal from 26 yards to make the score 22–7. On the Patriots' next possession, with Devon Witherspoon pressuring Maye on a cornerback blitz, Maye attempted a throw which was picked off by linebacker Uchenna Nwosu, who returned the ball 45 yards to the endzone to increase the lead to 29–7. That effectively clinched Seattle's second Lombardi Trophy with only 4:27 left to play. Maye responded with a pass to running back Rhamondre Stevenson for a touchdown; however, the two-point conversion pass to tight end Hunter Henry fell incomplete just before the two-minute warning. An onside kick by New England was recovered by the Seahawks' George Holani. A holding penalty on Seahawks center Jalen Sundell nullified a Walker 49-yard touchdown run, forcing them to punt just after the two-minute warning. The Patriots were unable to score as the game ended.

=== Post-game ===
Kenneth Walker III was named Super Bowl MVP, based on his 135 rushing yards on 27 carries. The Seattle defense was widely praised for their performance in a largely defensive game. At age 38, Mike Macdonald became the third-youngest head coach to win a Super Bowl, behind Sean McVay and Mike Tomlin. Darnold (who had led the league in regular season turnovers with 20) and the Seahawks (second in team regular season turnovers) became the first Super Bowl champions to commit zero turnovers in their postseason run.

=== Box score ===
Super Bowl LX – Seattle Seahawks 29, New England Patriots 13 – Game summary

Quarter	1	2	3	4	Total
Seahawks	3	6	3	17	29
Patriots	0	0	0	13	13

at Levi's Stadium, Santa Clara, California

- Date: February 8, 2026
- Game time: 6:30 p.m. EST/3:30 p.m. PST
- Game weather: Fair, 67 °F (19 °C)
- Game attendance: 70,823
- Referee: Shawn Smith
- TV announcers (NBC): Mike Tirico, Cris Collinsworth, Melissa Stark and Kaylee Hartung
- Recap, Game Book

Scoring summary

Quarter	Time	Drive			Team	Scoring information	Score	
Quarter	Time	Plays	Yards	TOP	Team	Scoring information	SEA	NE
1	11:58	8	51	3:02	SEA	33-yard field goal by Jason Myers	3	0
2	11:16	8	55	2:54	SEA	39-yard field goal by Myers	6	0
2	0:11	9	34	2:39	SEA	41-yard field goal by Myers	9	0
3	9:12	10	69	4:50	SEA	41-yard field goal by Myers	12	0
4	13:24	5	37	1:46	SEA	AJ Barner 16-yard touchdown reception from Sam Darnold, Myers kick good	19	0
4	12:27	3	65	0:57	NE	Mack Hollins 35-yard touchdown reception from Drake Maye, Andrés Borregales kick good	19	7
4	5:35	6	30	3:02	SEA	26-yard field goal by Myers	22	7
4	4:27	—	—	—	SEA	Interception returned 45 yards for touchdown by Uchenna Nwosu, Myers kick good	29	7
4	2:21	8	65	2:06	NE	Rhamondre Stevenson 7-yard touchdown reception from Maye, 2-point pass failed	29	13
"TOP" = time of possession. For other American football terms, see Glossary of American football.							29	13

== Final statistics ==
=== Statistical comparison ===
Team-to-team comparison
Statistic	Seattle Seahawks	New England Patriots
First downs	20	18
First downs rushing	9	2
First downs passing	11	14
First downs penalty	0	2
Third down efficiency	4–16	6–15
Fourth down efficiency	0–0	0–0
Total net yards	335	331
Net yards rushing	141	79
Rushing attempts	32	18
Yards per rush	4.4	4.4
Yards passing	194	252
Passing–completions/attempts	19–38	27–43
Times sacked–total yards	1–8	6–43
Interceptions thrown	0	2
Punt returns–total yards	2–16	2–4
Kickoff returns–total yards	1–20	5–141
Interceptions–total return yards	2–80	0–0
Punts–average yardage	7–47.9	8–44.5
Fumbles lost	0	1
Penalties–yards	4–25	3–25
Time of possession	33:11	26:49
Turnovers	0	3

Records set (Unless noted as "NFL Championships", "Single Postseason" or "Pro Football History", all records refer only to Super Bowls)
Most field goals made, game	5	Jason Myers
Most fair catches, game	6	Rashid Shaheed
Most Super Bowl appearances, team	12	New England
Most Super Bowl losses, team	6	New England
Most field goals, team, game	5	Seattle
Most teams played for by winning QB	5	Sam Darnold
Records tied
Most field goals attempted, game	5	Jason Myers
Fewest turnovers, game	0	Seattle
Fewest points, first half	0	New England
Fewest rushing touchdowns, game	0	New England
Fewest rushing touchdowns, game	0	Seattle
Fewest rushing touchdowns, combined both teams	0	

=== Individual statistics ===
Seattle statistics
Seahawks passing
	C/ATT^{[1]}	Yds	TD	INT	Rating
Sam Darnold	19/38	202	1	0	74.7
Seahawks rushing
	Car^{[2]}	Yds	TD	Lg^{[3]}	Yds/Car
Kenneth Walker III	27	135	0	30	5.0
George Holani	2	6	0	5	3.0
Sam Darnold	2	5	0	11	2.5
Rashid Shaheed	1	−5	0	−5	−5.0
Seahawks receiving
	Rec^{[4]}	Yds	TD	Lg^{[3]}	Target^{[5]}
Cooper Kupp	6	61	0	23	12
AJ Barner	4	54	1	16	4
Rashid Shaheed	2	27	0	16	5
Jaxon Smith-Njigba	4	27	0	16	10
Kenneth Walker III	2	26	0	20	4
George Holani	1	7	0	7	1

New England statistics
Patriots passing
	C/ATT^{[1]}	Yds	TD	INT	Rating
Drake Maye	27/43	295	2	2	79.1
Patriots rushing
	Car^{[2]}	Yds	TD	Lg^{[3]}	Yds/Car
Drake Maye	5	37	0	16	7.4
Rhamondre Stevenson	7	23	0	6	3.3
TreVeyon Henderson	6	19	0	9	3.2
Patriots receiving
	Rec^{[4]}	Yds	TD	Lg^{[3]}	Target^{[5]}
Mack Hollins	4	78	1	35	8
DeMario Douglas	5	45	0	11	7
Rhamondre Stevenson	5	40	1	13	5
Stefon Diggs	3	37	0	26	3
Hunter Henry	3	31	0	16	5
TreVeyon Henderson	3	26	0	24	3
Kayshon Boutte	1	21	0	21	5
Austin Hooper	2	10	0	5	3
Kyle Williams	1	7	0	7	2

Notes

- ^{^[1]} Completions/attempts
- ^{^[2]} Carries
- ^{^[3]} Long gain
- ^{^[4]} Receptions
- ^{^[5]} Times targeted

== Entertainment ==
=== Pregame ===
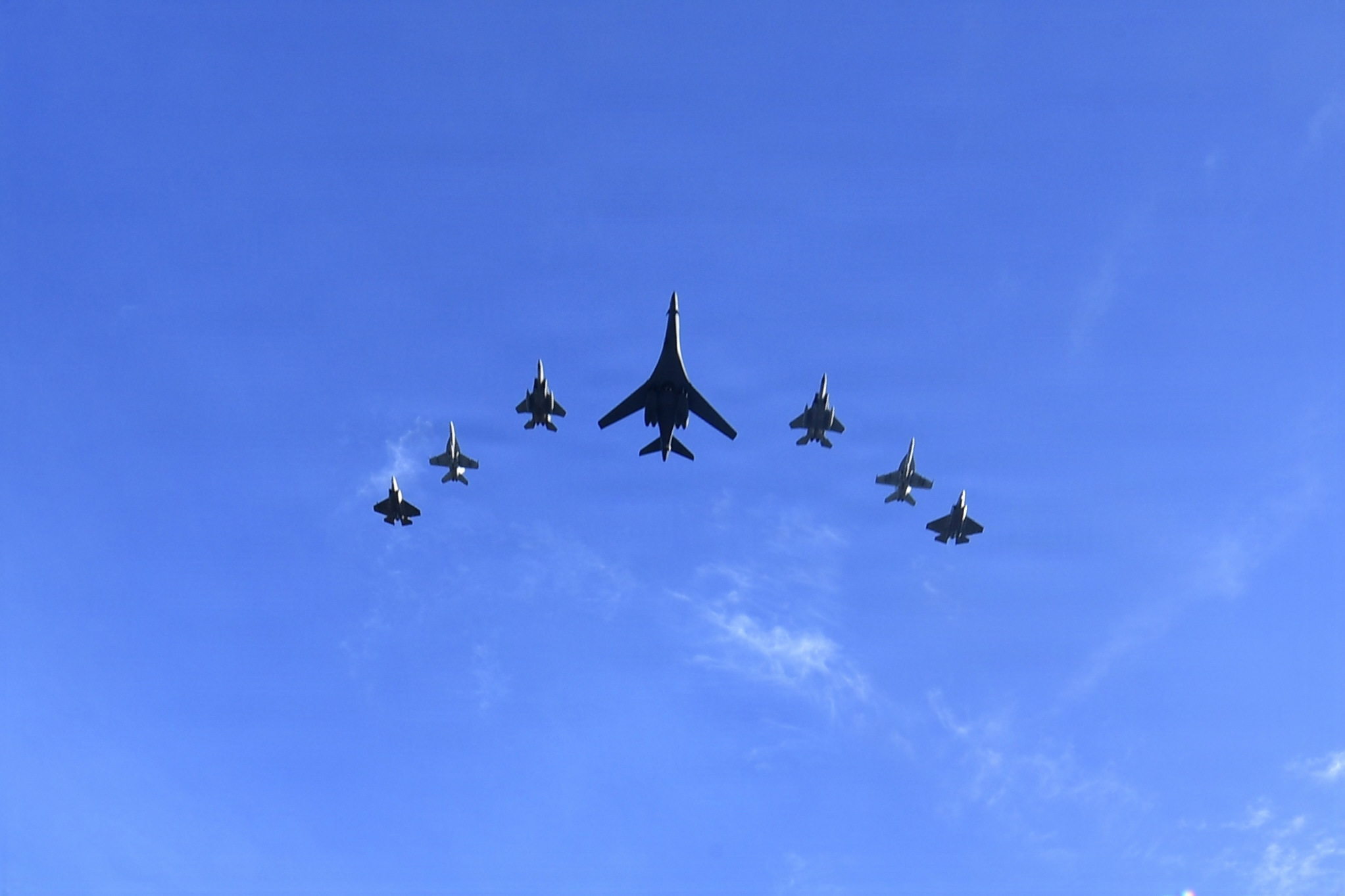
U.S. Navy and U.S. Air Force pilots conduct a flyover at Super Bowl LX at Levi Stadium, Santa Clara, California. The flyover included two U.S. Air Force B-1 Lancers, two U.S. Air National Guard F-15 Eagles, and two U.S. Navy F/A-18 Super Hornets and two F-35C Lightning II. (U.S. Navy official photo by Mass Communication Specialist 1st Class Aron Montano)

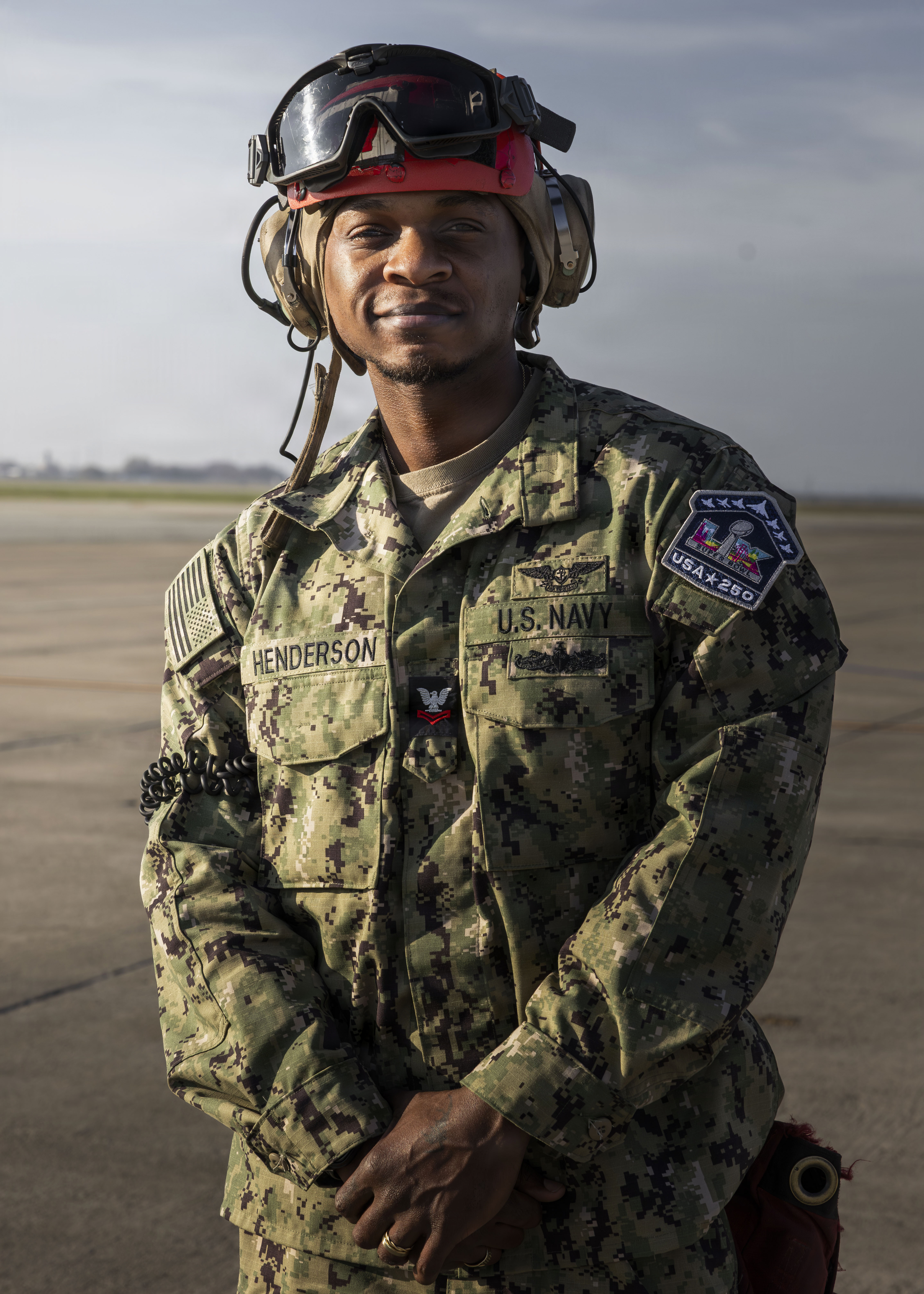
U.S. Navy AO2 Antwan Henderson, of Strike Fighter Squadron (VFA) 2 at Naval Air Station Lemoore, Calif., wears the special patch created for the pilots and maintainers of the navy and air force. (U.S. Air Force photo by Staff Sgt. Lauren Diaz)

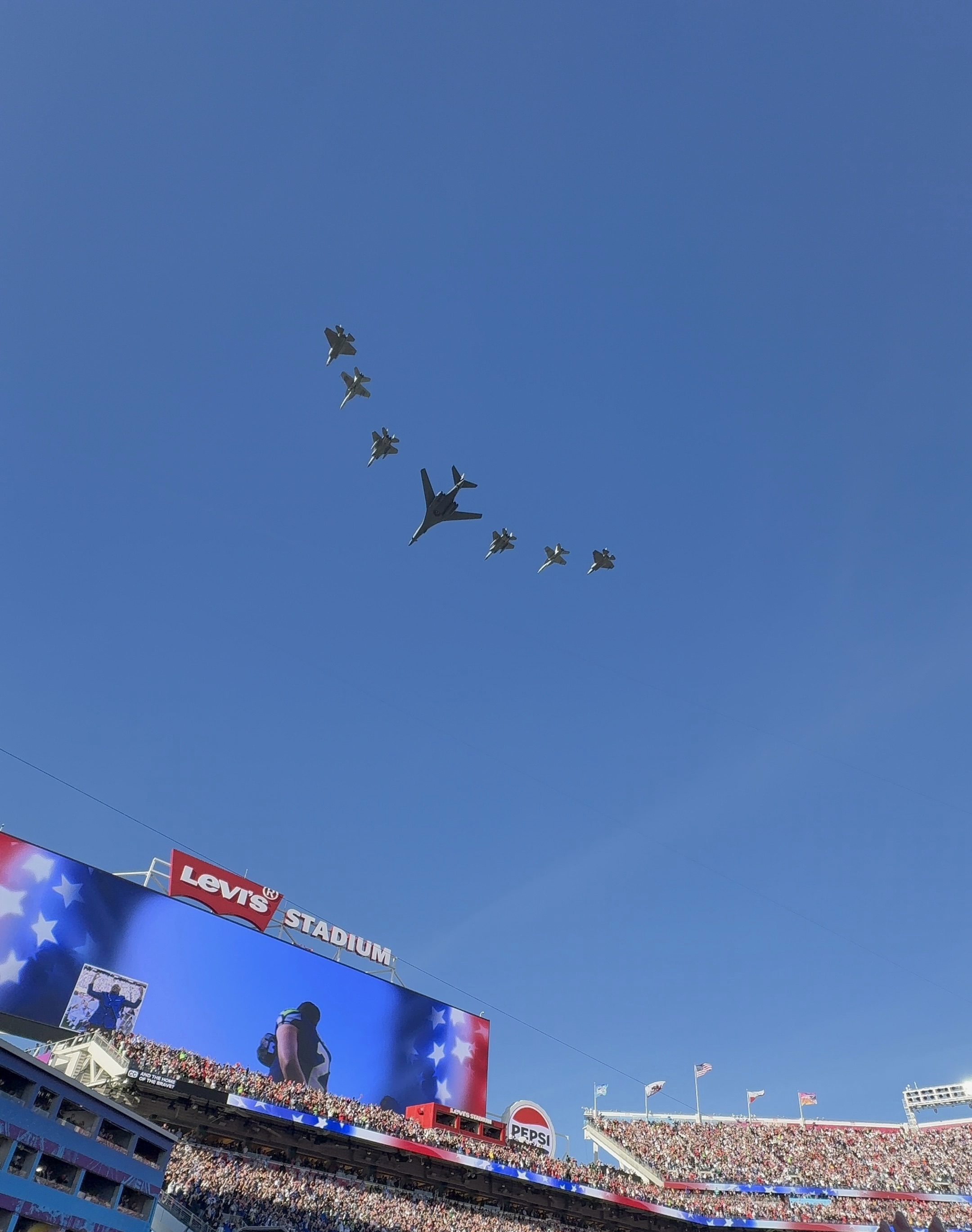
Flyover at Super Bowl LX at Levis Stadium, Santa Clara, California

East Bay-based rock band Green Day led the decennial tradition, which started with Super Bowl XX, in which past Super Bowl Most Valuable Players are honored before the game, by performing a medley of songs from their seventh album American Idiot (2004): "Holiday", "Boulevard of Broken Dreams" and the title track. The NFL also held ceremonies celebrating the United States Semiquincentennial. Pop singer Charlie Puth sang the national anthem accompanied by saxophonist Kenny G, the Oakland Interfaith Gospel Choir, the Sainted Trap Choir, the Color of Noize Orchestra directed by conductor Steve Hackman and American Sign Language performer Fred Beam who also signed "Lift Every Voice and Sing"; Americana singer-songwriter Brandi Carlile sang "America the Beautiful", accompanied by sign language performer Julian Ortiz; and R&B singer and daughter of former defensive lineman Mike Jones, Coco Jones, sang "Lift Every Voice and Sing". The anthem concluded with a historic joint U.S. Air Force/U.S. Navy combined flyover which included two B-1B Lancers from Ellsworth Air Force Base (South Dakota), two F-15C Eagles from the California Air National Guard, two F/A-18E Super Hornets and two F-35C Lightning IIs from Naval Air Station Lemoore (California). The Department of Defense said that the flyover celebrated 250 years of the U.S. Armed Forces "defending freedom".

=== Halftime ===
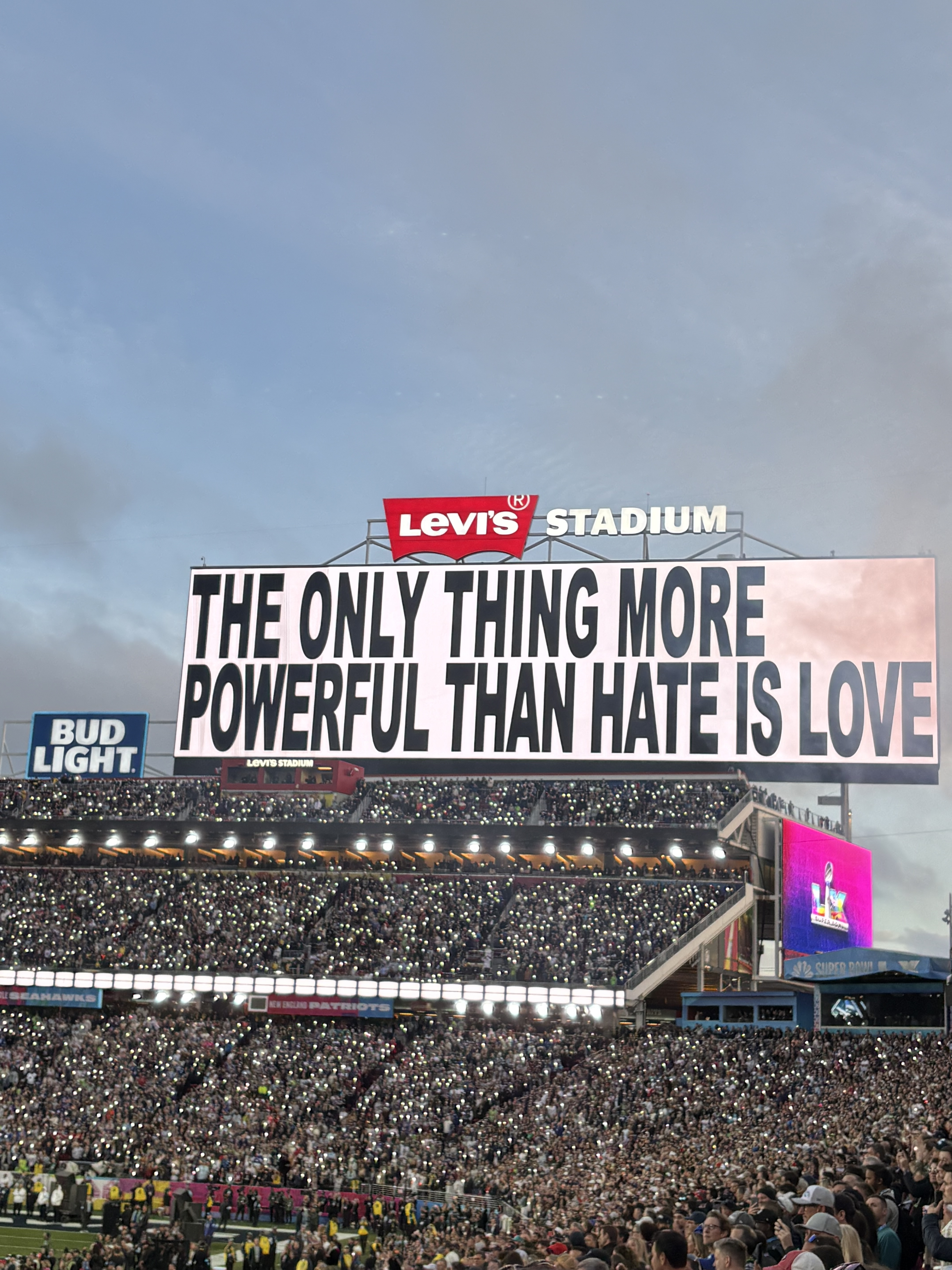
The Jumbotron message during Bad Bunny's 2026 half time show during the 2026 Super Bowl LX at Levis Stadium, Santa Clara, California

The Puerto Rican rapper and singer Bad Bunny headlined the Super Bowl LX halftime show. According to NFL executives, the selection helped fulfill a key business objective: growing the league's international and Latino audience. NFL Senior Vice President Marissa Solis told ESPN that the league identified the U.S. Latino population, a community of more than 70 million people, as a "critical growth area". As of 2024, the league reported over 39 million Latino fans in the United States, with executives stating that growth "is mathematically impossible without Latinos". The performance included guest appearances by Lady Gaga and Ricky Martin. Bad Bunny's performance was the fourth most-watched Super Bowl halftime performance, with an average of 128.2 million viewers.

The halftime show later received a record nine nominations at the 78th Primetime Emmy Awards, becoming the most Emmy-nominated Super Bowl halftime show in history, including nominations for:

- Outstanding Variety Special (Live)
- Outstanding Directing for a Variety Special
- Outstanding Production Design for a Variety Special
- Outstanding Choreography for Variety or Reality Programming
- Outstanding Hairstyling for a Variety, Nonfiction or Reality Program
- Outstanding Lighting Design/Lighting Direction for a Special
- Outstanding Music Direction
- Outstanding Technical Direction and Camerawork for a Special
- Outstanding Sound Mixing for a Variety Series or Special.

== Broadcasting ==
=== United States ===
==== Television ====
Super Bowl LX was televised by NBCUniversal properties by NBC Sports and Telemundo Deportes, with the main English-language broadcast on NBC, Spanish broadcasts on Telemundo and Universo, and streaming on Peacock, NFL+, and NBC Sports digital platforms. It was the third Super Bowl to be broadcast as part of the current 11-year NFL television contract, which allows a four-year rotation between CBS, Fox, NBC, and ABC/ESPN.

The game was called by NBC's lead broadcast team of play-by-play announcer Mike Tirico and color commentator Cris Collinsworth; the game marked Tirico's first Super Bowl as a commentator, and Collinsworth's sixth as an analyst. They were joined by Melissa Stark and Kaylee Hartung as sideline reporters, and Terry McAulay as rules analyst. Football Night in America host Maria Taylor presided over the Vince Lombardi Trophy presentation, becoming the first female sportscaster to do so since CBS' Lesley Visser did it for Super Bowl XXVI in 1992. The Spanish-language broadcast was called by Miguel Gurwitz and Rolando Cantú. As its lead-out after the game, NBC aired a block of Primetime in Milan for its 2026 Winter Olympics coverage. NBC cross-promoted the Super Bowl, Olympics, and the 2026 NBA All-Star Game the following week (the first to air on the network as part of NBC's broadcast rights to the NBA) under the banner "Legendary February".

NBC's pre-game show was broadcast from a studio within Levi's Stadium and incorporated live segments from Bay Area locations such as Alcatraz Island. During the playoffs, NBC tested new technologies that were utilized during the game, such as new Canon Cine-Servo camera lenses, and various on-air graphic updates (including new augmented reality weather visualizations and telestrators, and a refreshed score bug).

Super Bowl LX was watched by an average of 125.6 million viewers across NBCU's platforms and NFL+, and achieved a combined average household rating of 39.4 according to Nielsen. This made Super Bowl LX the second most-watched program in U.S. television history; while it fell short of Super Bowl LIX's record viewership the previous year by 2.8 million, it did set a new record for highest peak viewership with 137.8 million during the second quarter. The game also set a new record for Spanish-language broadcasts of the Super Bowl, with 3.3 million viewers tuning into Telemundo. The game was the first whose U.S. viewership was measured using Nielsen Media Research's "Big Data + Panel" methodology, which is more inclusive of data from streaming video services. Since its official implementation in September 2025, a number of sports telecasts had seen noticeable year-over-year increases in viewership credited to the new system.

==== Advertising ====
NBC charged a base rate of $10 million for a 30-second commercial during the game, two million more than the price Fox had initially offered the previous year; to maximize advertising revenue, NBC offered packages covering the Super Bowl, the Winter Olympics, and the NBA All-Star Game.

The Super Bowl Ad Meter survey conducted by USA Today was won by Budweiser for its commercial "American Icons", marking its second consecutive win after "First Delivery" at Super Bowl LIX and tenth overall. Artificial intelligence was a major theme for commercials during the Super Bowl, with OpenAI being joined by newcomer Anthropic, whose ads poked fun at OpenAI incorporating advertisements into ChatGPT. Svedka Vodka aired an entirely AI-generated advertisement, the first such instance at the Super Bowl. Pepsi's advertisement "The Choice" focused on a polar bear, a mascot for their main rivals Coca-Cola, choosing Pepsi over Coke; the commercial was directed by Taika Waititi and was seen as a shot at Coca-Cola's AI-generated Christmas advertisements which run in 2024 and 2025.

Celebrities featured in advertisements included Sabrina Carpenter for Pringles, Guy Fieri for Bosch and MrBeast for Salesforce (doubling as the launch of his "Million Dollar Puzzle" challenge). T-Mobile ran an ad featuring the Backstreet Boys performing inside one of their stores, while Coinbase aired a commercial stylized as a karaoke version of the band's song "Everybody (Backstreet's Back)". The Cadillac Formula 1 Team also aired an advertisement unveiling their car's livery for the 2026 F1 season.

Ring's "Search Party" advertisement generated significant controversy. Launched as a pilot program in September 2025, the feature's main use is to locate lost pets, but the advertisement during the Super Bowl and its subsequent national rollout raised significant privacy and mass surveillance concerns. The backlash caused Ring to back out of Search Party's planned integration with Flock Safety.

==== Radio ====
Westwood One held the national radio rights to the game; its broadcast was called by Kevin Harlan and Kurt Warner, joined by Laura Okmin as sideline reporter and Gene Steratore as rules analyst. Spanish radio rights were held by Entravision Communications, with its broadcast called by Ricardo Celis and Tony Nuñez.

=== International ===
- The game was televised by free-to-air networks 5 and Virgin Media One in the United Kingdom and Ireland respectively, and subscription channel Sky Sports.
- In Latin America, the game was televised by ESPN and streamed by Disney+.
- In Brazil, the game was televised by the Globo Media Group (on SporTV and GETV) and by ESPN Brazil.
- In Germany, Austria and Switzerland, the game was televised by RTL and streamed by DAZN.
- In Canada, the game was aired on CTV Television Network and TSN, in Newfoundland and Labrador on NTV, RDS in French, and streamed on TSN+ and DAZN.
- In Mexico, the game was televised on free-to-air television by Televisa's Canal 5 and TV Azteca's Azteca 7.
- In Australia, the game was televised on the Seven Network and its streaming service 7plus with the NBC broadcast feed. ESPN Australia also produced its own feed, featuring ESPN commentators Chris Fowler and Dan Orlovsky.
- In New Zealand the game was broadcast by TVNZ 1 and TVNZ+, and also on Disney+ .
- In France, the game was televised on M6 and beIN Sports.
- In India, the game was streamed on JioHotstar.
- In South Korea, the game was televised on MBC Sports+ and streamed on Coupang Play.
- In the Philippines, the game was televised on Premier Sports and streamed on Blast TV.
- In Indonesia, the game was aired for the first time by Emtek Group (Nex Parabola and Indonesian over-the-top streaming service Vidio), after previous rightsholder Mola closed down at the end of 2025. It was also shown on DAZN.

== Starting lineups ==
Starting lineups for Super Bowl LX
Seattle	Position		New England
Offense
Cooper Kupp	WR		Mack Hollins
Jaxon Smith-Njigba	WR	RB	TreVeyon Henderson
AJ Barner	TE		Austin Hooper
Eric Saubert	TE		Hunter Henry
Charles Cross	LT		Will Campbell
Grey Zabel	LG		Jared Wilson
Jalen Sundell	C		Garrett Bradbury
Anthony Bradford	RG		Mike Onwenu
Abraham Lucas	RT		Morgan Moses
Sam Darnold	QB		Drake Maye
Kenneth Walker III	RB		Rhamondre Stevenson
Defense
Leonard Williams	DT		Milton Williams
Byron Murphy II	NT		Cory Durden
Uchenna Nwosu	LB		Jahlani Tavai
DeMarcus Lawrence	LB		Anfernee Jennings
Ernest Jones	LB		Jack Gibbens
Drake Thomas	LB		Robert Spillane
Devon Witherspoon	CB		Carlton Davis
Josh Jobe	CB		Christian Gonzalez
Nick Emmanwori	S	DT	Christian Barmore
Coby Bryant	S		Jaylinn Hawkins
Julian Love	S		Craig Woodson

== Officials ==
Super Bowl LX featured seven officials, a replay-official, a replay assistant, and eight alternate officials. The numbers in parentheses below indicate their uniform numbers.

- Game officials:
  - Referee: Shawn Smith (14)
  - Umpire: Roy Ellison (81)
  - Down judge: Dana McKenzie (8)
  - Line judge: Julian Mapp (10)
  - Field judge: Jason Ledet (72)
  - Side judge: Eugene Hall (103)
  - Back judge: Greg Steed (12)
  - Replay official: Andrew Lambert
  - Replay assistant: Julie Johnson
- Alternate officials:
  - Referee: Shawn Hochuli (83)
  - Umpire: Terry Killens (77)
  - Down judge: David Oliver
  - Line judge: Tom Eaton
  - Field judge: Jabir Walker
  - Side judge: Anthony Jeffries
  - Back judge: Brad Freeman
  - Replay official: Chad Adams

Smith served as the referee for his first on-field Super Bowl assignment after being the alternate referee for two earlier Super Bowls.

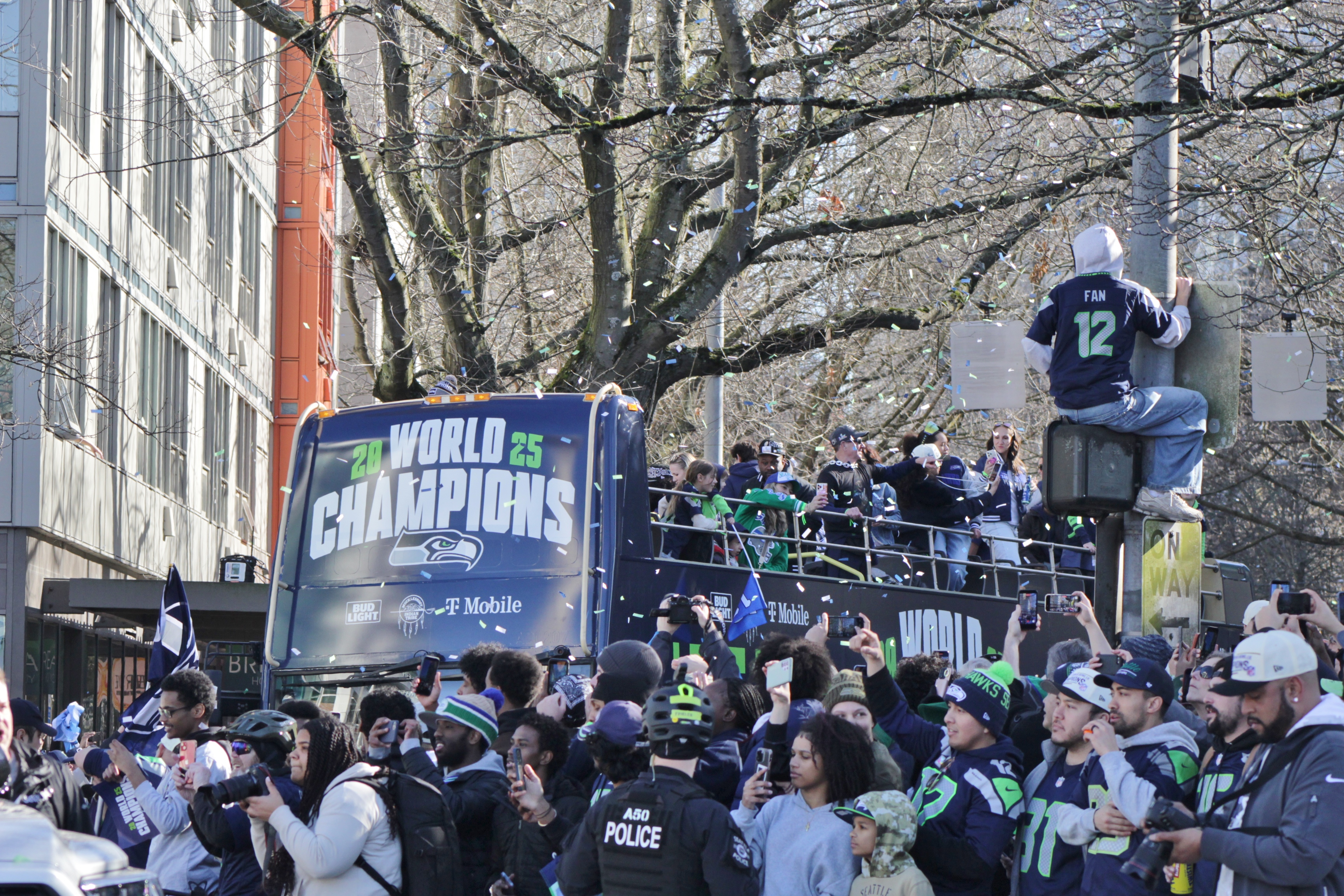
The Seahawks Super Bowl LX parade on Denny Way in Seattle.

== Aftermath ==
The Seahawks hosted a victory parade through Downtown Seattle on February 11 that began with a rally at Lumen Field and ended near the Seattle Center. The players and staff rode on several buses and U.S. National Guard vehicles; a crowd estimated in the "hundreds of thousands" watched the parade. That day, over 200,000 passengers used the Link light rail system, which had increased service to account for parade attendance.

The Seahawks were put up for sale by the estate of Paul Allen by his sister, Jody Allen, as directed in his will. This marked the first time a Super Bowl champion was put on the market in the same year. On August 26, they were sold to Neeru Khosla for a price of $9.612 billion.

The 2026 NFL season began with a Super Bowl LX rematch, with the Seahawks hosting the Patriots at Lumen Field. It was the first meeting of both reigning Super Bowl participants in the Kickoff Game since 2016. The Seahawks defeated the Patriots, 13–10.
