= Mack Hollins =

American football player (born 1993)

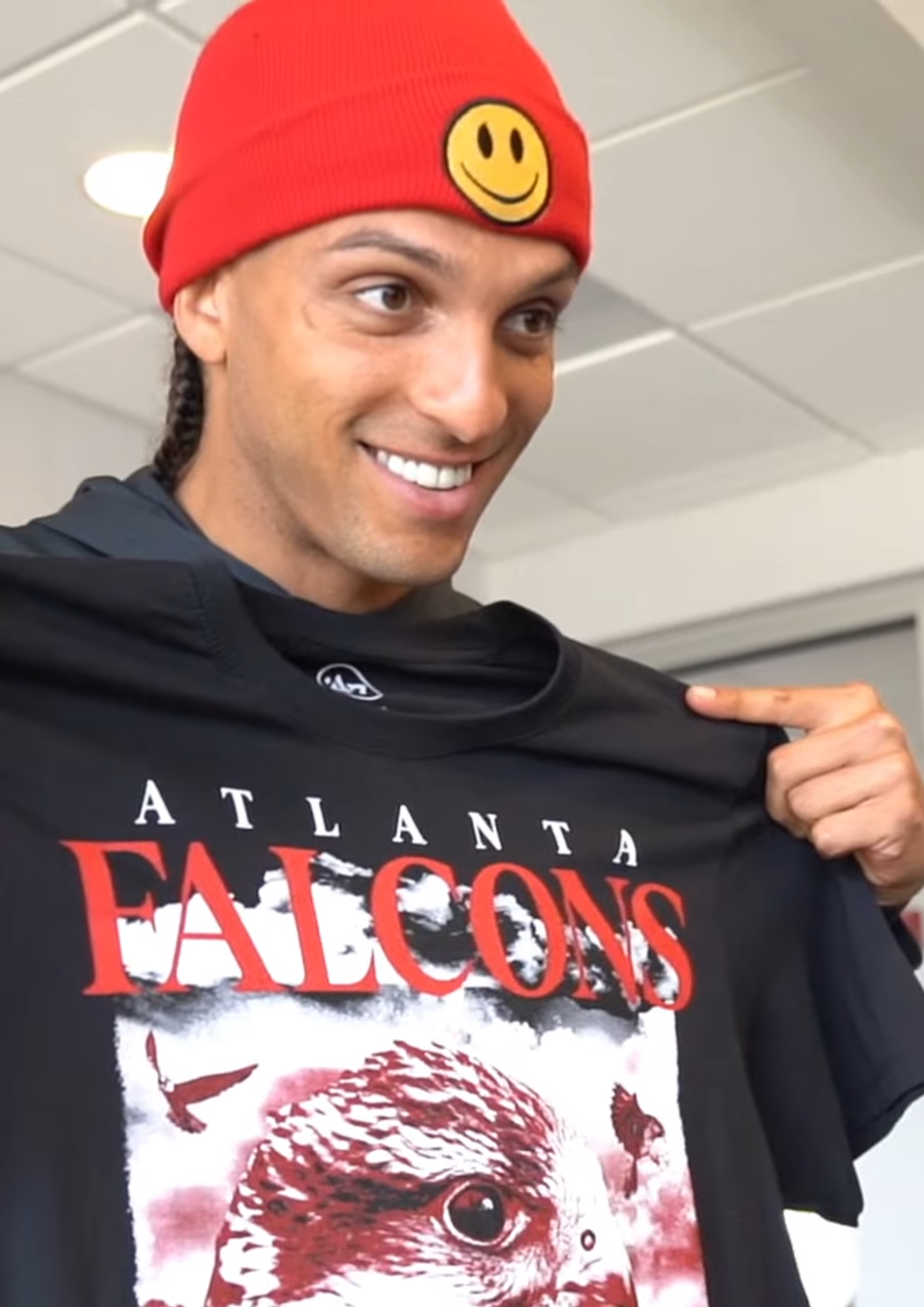
- Hollins in 2023

No. 13 – New England Patriots
- Position: Wide receiver
- Roster status: Active

Personal information
- Born: September 16, 1993 (age 33); Rockville, Maryland, U.S.
- Listed height: 6 ft 4 in (1.93 m)
- Listed weight: 221 lb (100 kg)

Career information
- High school: Thomas S. Wootton (Rockville)
- College: North Carolina (2012–2016)
- NFL draft: 2017: 4th round, 118th overall pick

Career history
- Philadelphia Eagles (2017–2019); Miami Dolphins (2019–2021); Las Vegas Raiders (2022); Atlanta Falcons (2023); Buffalo Bills (2024); New England Patriots (2025–present)

Awards and highlights
- Super Bowl champion (LII); Second-team All-ACC (2015)

Career NFL statistics as of Week 10, 2026
- Receptions: 231
- Receiving yards: 2,912
- Receiving touchdowns: 18
- Stats at Pro Football Reference

Mack Hollins (born September 16, 1993) is an American professional football wide receiver for the New England Patriots of the National Football League (NFL). He played college football for the North Carolina Tar Heels, receiving second-team All-ACC honors in 2018. Hollins was selected in the fourth round of the 2017 NFL draft by the Philadelphia Eagles, where he played his first two seasons and was a member of the team that won Super Bowl LII. He has also been a member of the Miami Dolphins, Las Vegas Raiders, Atlanta Falcons, and Buffalo Bills. Hollins joined the Patriots in 2025.

== Early life ==
Hollins attended Robert Frost Middle School in Rockville, Maryland, and later Thomas S. Wootton High School. After not receiving any scholarship offers out of high school, Hollins attended Fork Union Military Academy in Fork Union, Virginia, where he played with Cardale Jones. Hollins received several offers, including a walk-on opportunity at the University of North Carolina contingent upon being accepted by the school. He joined the team in 2012.

== College career ==
As a freshman in 2013, Hollins was named special teams captain after appearing in all 13 games. He played on most special teams and as a reserve wide receiver. Hollins finished the regular season with nine tackles and recovered a fumble against Duke.

As a sophomore in 2014, Hollins earned honorable mention All-Atlantic Coast Conference (ACC) accolades after finishing with 35 catches for a team-high 613 yards. He also had a team-best eight receiving touchdowns. As one of the teams best special teams players, Hollins also had seven tackles and recovered an onside kick. He earned ACC Receiver of the Week honors after catching two passes for 120 yards and two touchdowns against Virginia. Both touchdowns were over 50 yards (57 and 63), making Hollins the first Tar Heel to have two touchdown receptions of 50+ yards since Hakeem Nicks in 2008. He reeled in a 91-yard touchdown pass in a win over San Diego State University. The 91-yard scoring play with quarterback Marquise Williams was the longest play by UNC in Kenan Stadium history and third-longest play in school history.

As a junior in 2015, Hollins led all NCAA major college players with an average of 24.8 yards per reception. He caught at least one pass in all 13 games and found the end zone in seven different contests, including five of UNC's six wins Hollins earned up his second ACC Receiver of the Week honor after catching five balls for 165 yards and a 74-yard touchdown in the win over Duke. Hollins became the first Tar Heel to catch three touchdowns since 2011 when he tallied three scores against Wake Forest. His first ACC Receiver of the Week honors of the year came after catching three passes for 100 yards and two touchdowns in the win over Delaware.

Hollins graduated from UNC with a degree in exercise and sport science.

=== College statistics ===
| Season | Team | Games | | Receiving | | | | |
| Season | Team | GP | GS | Rec | Yds | Avg | Lng | TD |
|---|---|---|---|---|---|---|---|---|
| 2014 | North Carolina | 13 | 5 | 35 | 613 | 17.5 | 91 | 8 |
| 2015 | North Carolina | 13 | 13 | 30 | 745 | 24.8 | 74 | 8 |
| 2016 | North Carolina | 7 | 7 | 16 | 309 | 19.3 | 71 | 4 |
| Career | | 33 | 25 | 81 | 1,667 | 20.6 | 91 | 20 |

== Professional career ==
Pre-draft measurables
| Height | Weight | Arm length | Hand span | Wingspan | 40-yard dash | 10-yard split | 20-yard split |
|---|---|---|---|---|---|---|---|
| 6 ft 4 in (1.93 m) | 221 lb (100 kg) | 33 1/4 in (0.84 m) | 9 3/4 in (0.25 m) | 6 ft 8 3/8 in (2.04 m) | 4.53 s | 1.59 s | 2.64 s |
All values from NFL Combine

=== Philadelphia Eagles ===
Hollins was selected by the Philadelphia Eagles in the fourth round (118th overall) of the 2017 NFL draft.

During Week 2 against the Kansas City Chiefs, Hollins had his first three career receptions, which went for 32 yards in the 27–20 loss. In Week 7 against the Washington Redskins, he recorded a 64-yard touchdown reception from Carson Wentz, the first of his career. Hollins also played heavily on special teams.

In 2018, Hollins and the Eagles beat the New England Patriots in Super Bowl LII, with Hollins primarily playing on special teams.

On September 6, 2018, Hollins was placed on injured reserve with a groin injury.

During the 2019 offseason, Hollins gave his jersey number, No. 10, to veteran DeSean Jackson, who had worn the number during his time playing in Philadelphia from 2008 to 2013. Hollins changed to No. 16.

On December 3, 2019, Hollins was waived by the Eagles.

=== Miami Dolphins ===
On December 4, 2019, Hollins was claimed off waivers by the Miami Dolphins.

In Week 9 of the 2020 season against the Arizona Cardinals, Hollins hauled in an 11-yard fourth quarter touchdown pass over the head of his defender, helping the Dolphins to their fourth straight win. In Week 13 against the Cincinnati Bengals, Hollins was ejected from the game after fighting Bengals players. In Week 16 against the Las Vegas Raiders, Hollins caught a 34-yard pass from Ryan Fitzpatrick to set up the game winning field goal in the final seconds of the game.

Hollins re-signed with the Dolphins on March 23, 2021. On September 8, he was named one of five team captains for the 2021 season, as voted by his teammates. In the 2021 season, Hollins had 14 receptions for 223 yards and four touchdowns.

=== Las Vegas Raiders ===
On March 17, 2022, Hollins signed with the Raiders. On September 25, Hollins caught eight receptions for a career-high 158 yards and a touchdown, during a narrow 24–22 road loss to the Tennessee Titans. For the 2022 season, he finished with 57 receptions for 690 yards and four touchdowns.

=== Atlanta Falcons ===
On March 21, 2023, Hollins signed a one-year contract with the Atlanta Falcons. He played in 13 games with three starts, recording 18 catches for 251 yards and no touchdowns.

=== Buffalo Bills ===
On March 14, 2024, Hollins signed a one-year contract with the Buffalo Bills. Brought in as a blocking receiver, Hollins also played on special teams, but he caught five touchdowns on the season, which both led the team and was a new career-high.

=== New England Patriots ===
On March 14, 2025, Hollins signed a two-year contract with the New England Patriots. On December 27, he was placed on injured reserve due to an abdomen injury. Hollins finished the 2025 season with 46 receptions for 550 yards and two touchdowns in 15 games with 13 starts.

Hollins was activated on January 24, 2026, ahead of the team's AFC Championship Game against the Denver Broncos. Hollins would record two receptions for 51 yards in the 10–7 win, advancing to Super Bowl LX and Hollins' second Super Bowl appearance. In the Super Bowl, Hollins caught four of eight passes for 78 yards and a touchdown.

== NFL career statistics ==
Legend
| | Won the Super Bowl |
| **Bold** | Career high |

=== Regular season ===
| Year | Team | Games | | Receiving | | | | | Rushing | | | | | Tackles | | | Fumbles | | | |
| Year | Team | GP | GS | Rec | Yds | Avg | Lng | TD | Att | Yds | Avg | Lng | TD | Cmb | Solo | Ast | FR | Yds | Fum | Lost |
|---|---|---|---|---|---|---|---|---|---|---|---|---|---|---|---|---|---|---|---|---|
| 2017 | PHI | 16 | 0 | 16 | 226 | 14.1 | 64 | 1 | 0 | 0 | 0.0 | 0 | 0 | 5 | 4 | 1 | **1** | **-16** | 0 | 0 |
| 2018 | PHI | 0 | 0 | Did not play due to injury | | | | | | | | | | | | | | | | |
| 2019 | PHI | 12 | 3 | 10 | 125 | 12.5 | 20 | 0 | 0 | 0 | 0.0 | 0 | 0 | 1 | 1 | 0 | 0 | 0 | 0 | 0 |
| 2019 | MIA | 4 | 0 | 0 | 0 | 0.0 | 0 | 0 | 0 | 0 | 0.0 | 0 | 0 | 1 | 0 | 1 | 0 | 0 | 0 | 0 |
| 2020 | MIA | 16 | 2 | 16 | 176 | 11.0 | 34 | 1 | 0 | 0 | 0.0 | 0 | 0 | 3 | 1 | **2** | 0 | 0 | **1** | **1** |
| 2021 | MIA | **17** | 3 | 14 | 223 | **15.9** | **65** | 4 | 0 | 0 | 0.0 | 0 | 0 | **11** | **9** | **2** | 0 | 0 | 0 | 0 |
| 2022 | LV | **17** | **16** | **57** | **690** | 12.1 | 60 | 4 | **4** | **40** | **10.0** | **17** | 0 | 3 | 2 | 1 | 0 | 0 | 0 | 0 |
| 2023 | ATL | 13 | 3 | 18 | 251 | 13.9 | 45 | 0 | 0 | 0 | 0.0 | 0 | 0 | 3 | 3 | 0 | 0 | 0 | 0 | 0 |
| 2024 | BUF | **17** | 13 | 31 | 378 | 12.2 | 44 | **5** | 0 | 0 | 0.0 | 0 | 0 | 1 | 0 | 1 | **1** | 0 | 0 | 0 |
| 2025 | NE | 15 | 13 | 46 | 550 | 12.6 | 54 | 2 | 1 | 4 | 4.0 | 4 | 0 | 0 | 0 | 0 | 0 | 0 | **1** | 0 |
| 2026 | NE | 6 | 5 | 23 | 293 | 12.7 | 26 | 1 | 0 | 0 | 0.0 | 0 | 0 | 0 | 0 | 0 | 0 | 0 | 0 | 0 |
| Career | | 133 | 58 | 231 | 2,912 | 12.6 | 65 | 18 | 5 | 44 | 8.8 | 17 | 0 | 28 | 20 | 8 | 2 | -16 | 2 | 1 |

=== Postseason ===
| Year | Team | Games | | Receiving | | | | | Rushing | | | | | Fumbles | |
| Year | Team | GP | GS | Rec | Yds | Avg | Lng | TD | Att | Yds | Avg | Lng | TD | Fum | Lost |
|---|---|---|---|---|---|---|---|---|---|---|---|---|---|---|---|
| 2017 | PHI | 3 | 0 | 1 | 9 | 9.0 | 9 | 0 | 0 | – | – | – | – | 0 | – |
| 2018 | PHI | 0 | 0 | Did not play due to injury | | | | | | | | | | | |
| 2024 | BUF | 3 | 2 | **5** | **104** | 20.8 | 34 | **1** | 0 | – | – | – | – | 0 | – |
| 2025 | NE | 2 | 2 | 6 | 129 | **21.5** | **35** | **1** | 0 | – | – | – | – | 0 | – |
| Career | | 8 | 4 | 12 | 242 | 20.2 | 35 | 2 | 0 | – | – | – | – | 0 | – |

== Personal life ==
Hollins has become well-known among fans and teammates for his eccentric personality, game day outfits, and habits, which include walking around barefoot as much as possible, eating without utensils, and avoiding house cats, even inspiring several teammates to try his habits. He has gained the nickname "Tarzan" as a result. Hollins rarely drinks water due to his belief that "water's a scam," and he primarily drinks watermelon juice. Hollins' diet mainly consists of raw meat, raw milk and fruit, and he claims to have not eaten any vegetables since 2022.

Hollins is a longtime volunteer for Special Olympics and also serves as a Global Ambassador for the organization. Hollins also has an active TikTok account, which he focuses on "life hacks" and home improvement ideas.

== See also ==
- List of barefooters
- List of NCAA major college football yearly receiving leaders
