= Elliott Davison =

American football player (born 2001)

No. 37 – New England Patriots
- Position: Safety
- Roster status: Practice squad

Personal information
- Born: December 19, 2001 (age 24); Tyler, Texas, U.S.
- Listed height: 6 ft 0 in (1.83 m)
- Listed weight: 190 lb (86 kg)

Career information
- High school: Robert E. Lee (Tyler, Texas)
- College: Incarnate Word (2020–2022); UTSA (2023–2024)
- NFL draft: 2025: undrafted

Career history
- New Orleans Saints (2025)*; New England Patriots (2026–present)
- * Offseason or practice squad member only

Career NFL statistics as of Week 5, 2026
- Tackles: 2
- Pass deflections: 1
- Stats at Pro Football Reference

Elliott Davison (born December 19, 2001) is an American professional football safety for the New England Patriots of the National Football League (NFL). He played college football for the Incarnate Word Cardinals and UTSA Roadrunners. Davison has also been a member of the New Orleans Saints.

== Early life ==
Davison was born on December 19, 2001, in Tyler, Texas. He is half-Australian. Davison attended Robert E. Lee High School in Tyler and competed in football, basketball and track and field. A defensive back in football, he was second-team all-district in his sophomore year and second-team all-district and second-team all-East Texas in his junior year. Davison helped Lee to the playoffs and was named first-team all-district and all-state as a senior while posting 108 tackles, six interceptions and seven pass breakups. After high school, Davison began his college football career with the Incarnate Word.

== College career ==
Davison earned a starting role as a true freshman at Incarnate Word, playing in the spring 2021 season after the fall 2020 season was postponed due to the COVID-19 pandemic. He appeared in five games and tallied one interception and three pass breakups. In the following season, Davison posted 55 tackles, a team-leading four interceptions and seven pass breakups. He led the team again with three interceptions in 2022, also having 42 tackles and six pass breakups.

Davison transferred to the UTSA Roadrunners for the 2023 season and had 40 tackles and two interceptions. Given an extra year of eligibility due to the pandemic, Davison returned to the Roadrunners for a final season in 2024. He started all 13 games at safety and led the team's defensive backs room with 58 tackles.

== Professional career ==
=== New Orleans Saints ===
After going unselected in the 2025 NFL draft, Davison signed with the New Orleans Saints as an undrafted free agent. He was waived on August 26, 2025, then re-signed to the practice squad the next day.

After spending the entire season on the practice squad, he signed a reserve/future contract with the Saints on January 5, 2026. He was waived by the Saints as a part of final roster cuts on August 30.

=== New England Patriots ===
On September 3, 2026, Davison was signed to the practice squad of the New England Patriots. He was released by New England on September 14, but was re-signed the next day. He was elevated to the active roster for the team's Week 5 game against the Las Vegas Raiders and made his NFL debut in the game, recording two tackles and a pass defended. On October 19, he was signed to the active roster. He was waived on November 2 and re-signed to the practice squad two days later.
