= Ben Brown (American football) =

American football player (born 1998)

No. 77 – New England Patriots
- Position: Interior lineman
- Roster status: Active

Personal information
- Born: May 19, 1998 (age 28); Vicksburg, Mississippi, U.S.
- Listed height: 6 ft 5 in (1.96 m)
- Listed weight: 313 lb (142 kg)

Career information
- High school: St. Aloysius (MS)
- College: Ole Miss (2017–2021)
- NFL draft: 2022: undrafted

Career history
- Cincinnati Bengals (2022); Seattle Seahawks (2023); Arizona Cardinals (2023)*; Las Vegas Raiders (2024)*; New England Patriots (2024–present)
- * Offseason or practice squad member only

Career NFL statistics as of 2025
- Games played: 28
- Games started: 14
- Stats at Pro Football Reference

Timothy Benjamin Brown (born May 19, 1998) is an American professional football offensive lineman for the New England Patriots of the National Football League (NFL). He played college football for the Ole Miss Rebels and has also been a member of the Cincinnati Bengals.

== Early life ==
Brown was born on May 19, 1998. He attended St. Aloysius High School in Vicksburg, Mississippi, where he played offensive tackle and defensive tackle and earned first-team all-state honors, as well as second-team All-American honors, as a senior while compiling 37 tackles and a sack and helping St. Aloysius gain 2,596 rushing yards with an average 7.2 yards-per-carry.

Ranked a three-star recruit, Brown committed to play college football for the Ole Miss Rebels.

== College career ==
As a true freshman at Ole Miss in 2017, Brown redshirted. The following year, he became a starter at right guard and started every game, not allowing any sacks on 446 pass plays while earning Southeastern Conference (SEC) All-Freshman honors while being one of three freshmen nationally to start every game at his position. In 2019, Brown started all 12 games, allowing only one sack, while playing a total of 765 snaps at offensive guard and 99 at center.

Brown transitioned to being a center full-time in 2020 and started all 10 games, being named to the watchlist for the Rimington Trophy as best center nationally. He continued starting as a senior in 2021, but ended up missing the final half of the year after tearing his biceps in the final minutes of Ole Miss' game against Tennessee. He finished his collegiate career having started 40 consecutive games.

== Professional career ==
Pre-draft measurables
Height	Weight	Arm length	Hand span	Wingspan
6 ft 5 1/8 in (1.96 m)	312 lb (142 kg)	34 3/8 in (0.87 m)	10 1/4 in (0.26 m)	6 ft 9 3/4 in (2.08 m)
All values from NFL Combine

=== Cincinnati Bengals ===
Brown had been commonly projected to be a fifth-to-sixth round pick in the 2022 NFL draft prior to his injury, but afterwards went unselected. He signed with the Cincinnati Bengals as an undrafted free agent. He injured his biceps in the first preseason game and was placed on injured reserve, ending his first season. The following season, he was released at the final roster cuts on August 29, 2023.

=== Seattle Seahawks ===
Two days after being released by Cincinnati, Brown was signed to the practice squad of the Seattle Seahawks. He was signed to the active roster on September 4. He was waived on October 21, 2023 and re-signed to the practice squad. He was released on November 26.

=== Arizona Cardinals ===
On January 1, 2024, Brown was signed to the Arizona Cardinals' practice squad. He was not signed to a reserve/future contract after the season, and thus became a free agent upon the expiration of his practice squad contract.

=== Las Vegas Raiders ===
On January 16, 2024, Brown signed a reserve/future contract with the Las Vegas Raiders. He was waived on August 27, and re-signed to the practice squad.

=== New England Patriots ===
On October 10, 2024, Brown was signed to the New England Patriots' active roster off the Raiders practice squad. He made his first NFL career start at center, in Week 6 against the Houston Texans.

On December 23, 2025, Brown signed a two-year, $6.6 million contract extension with the Patriots.

== Personal life ==
Brown is the seventh member of his family to play for the Rebels. Brown's grandfather Allen Brown also played professional football with the Green Bay Packers, winning Super Bowl I and Super Bowl II.
