= DeMario Douglas =

American football player (born 2000)

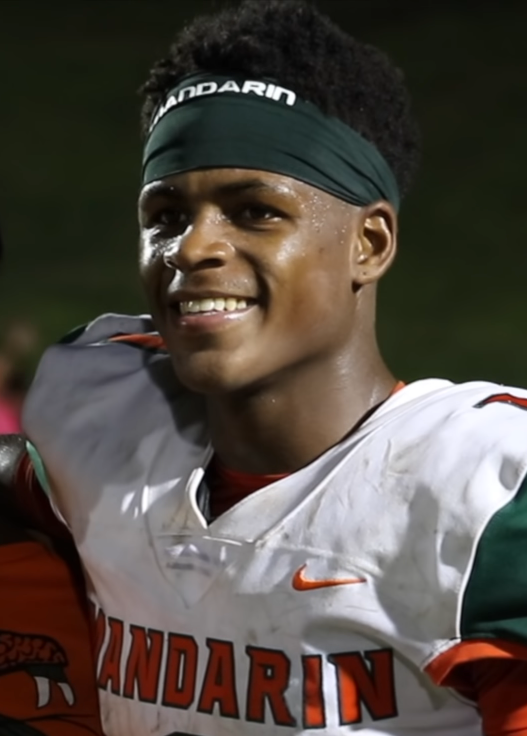
- Douglas with Mandarin High School in 2018

No. 3 – New England Patriots
- Position: Wide receiver
- Roster status: Active

Personal information
- Born: December 8, 2000 (age 25); St. Augustine, Florida, U.S.
- Listed height: 5 ft 8 in (1.73 m)
- Listed weight: 185 lb (84 kg)

Career information
- High school: Mandarin (Jacksonville, Florida)
- College: Liberty (2019–2022)
- NFL draft: 2023: 6th round, 210th overall pick

Career history
- New England Patriots (2023–present)

Career NFL statistics as of Week 8, 2026
- Receptions: 172
- Receiving yards: 1,961
- Receiving touchdowns: 10
- Rushing yards: 78
- Return yards: 56
- Stats at Pro Football Reference

DeMario "Pop" Douglas (born December 8, 2000) is an American professional football wide receiver for the New England Patriots of the National Football League (NFL). He played college football for the Liberty Flames, and was selected by the Patriots in the sixth round of the 2023 NFL draft.

== Early life ==
Douglas grew up in St. Augustine, Florida and initially attended Pedro Menendez High School. He transferred to Mandarin High School in Jacksonville after his sophomore year. His quarterback there was Arizona Cardinals quarterback Carson Beck. Douglas finished his senior season with over 1,700 all-purpose yards, 1,300 receiving yards and scored 18 touchdowns, scoring four touchdowns in the state championship game.

== College career ==
Douglas played for the Liberty Flames for four seasons. He had nine receptions for 136 yards and a touchdown in four games during his true freshman season before redshirting the year. As a redshirt freshman, Douglas caught 32 passes for 363 yards and three touchdowns. He also returned 15 punts for 166 yards and one touchdown and was named a freshman All-American at returner by the Football Writers Association of America. Douglas led the Flames with 52 receptions and 701 receiving yards and had six touchdown receptions during his redshirt sophomore season and also had 23 punt returns for 143 yards and one touchdown. As a redshirt junior, he caught 79 passes for 993 yards and six touchdowns.

== Professional career ==
Pre-draft measurables
Height	Weight	Arm length	Hand span	Wingspan	40-yard dash	10-yard split	20-yard split	20-yard shuttle	Three-cone drill	Vertical jump	Broad jump	Bench press
5 ft 8 1/4 in (1.73 m)	179 lb (81 kg)	30 1/4 in (0.77 m)	8 3/4 in (0.22 m)	6 ft 0 1/2 in (1.84 m)	4.44 s	1.54 s	2.54 s	4.29 s	7.05 s	39.5 in (1.00 m)	11 ft 2 in (3.40 m)	12 reps
All values from NFL Combine/Pro Day

Douglas was selected by the New England Patriots in the sixth round, 210th overall, of the 2023 NFL draft. As a rookie, he appeared in 14 games and started seven. He finished with 49 receptions for 561 yards.

In Week 6 of the 2024 season against the Houston Texans, Douglas had six receptions for 92 yards and scored his first career touchdown in the 21–41 loss. He finished the season with 66 receptions for 621 yards and three touchdowns.

In Week 9 of the 2025 season against the Atlanta Falcons, Douglas set a career-high of 100 receiving yards on four receptions with one touchdown in the 24–23 win. He finished the season with 31 receptions for 447 yards and three touchdowns. He had a receiving touchdown in the Patriots' 28–16 win over the Texans in the Divisional Round. He had five receptions for 54 yards in Super Bowl LX, a 29–13 loss to the Seahawks.

== NFL career statistics ==
Legend
**Bold**	Career high

=== Regular season ===
Year	Team	Games		Receiving					Rushing					Fumbles	
Year	Team	GP	GS	Rec	Yds	Avg	Lng	TD	Att	Yds	Avg	Lng	TD	Fum	Lost
2023	NE	14	**7**	49	561	11.4	42	0	**8**	**41**	5.1	**20**	0	3	**3**
2024	NE	**17**	**7**	**66**	**621**	9.4	36	3	3	16	**5.3**	9	0	1	0
2025	NE	**17**	0	31	447	**14.4**	**58**	3	7	21	3.0	14	0	0	0
2026	NE	6	2	20	332	11.7	39	**4**	0	0	0.0	0	0	0	0
Career		54	16	166	1,862	11.2	58	9	18	78	4.3	20	0	4	3

== Personal life ==
On November 1, 2025, Douglas’ uncle, nicknamed “Tiger,” died in a shooting. The following day, Douglas dedicated his career-high performance to him. Coincidentally, Douglas' childhood friend and teammate at the time, Terrell Jennings, scored his first NFL touchdown in that same game and also dedicated his performance to Douglas’s uncle.
