= Kenneth Harris (American football) =

American football player (born 2002)

No. 33 – Indianapolis Colts
- Position: Cornerback
- Roster status: Active

Personal information
- Born: May 2, 2002 (age 24); Columbia, Louisiana, U.S.
- Listed height: 6 ft 0 in (1.83 m)
- Listed weight: 192 lb (87 kg)

Career information
- High school: Caldwell Parrish (Columbia, Louisiana)
- College: Arkansas State (2020–2022); Oklahoma State (2023–2025)
- NFL draft: 2026: undrafted

Career history
- New England Patriots (2026)*; Indianapolis Colts (2026–present)
- * Offseason or practice squad member only

Career NFL statistics as of 2026
- Tackles: 1
- Stats at Pro Football Reference

Kenneth Harris (born May 2, 2002) is an American professional football cornerback for the Indianapolis Colts of the National Football League (NFL). He played college football for the Arkansas State Red Wolves and Oklahoma State Cowboys.

== Early life ==
Harris was born on May 2, 2002, and grew up in Columbia, Louisiana. He attended Caldwell Parish High School in Columbia where he competed in football as a wide receiver and defensive back, earning honorable mention all-state honors and first-team all-district honors as a senior. A three-star recruit, he committed to play college football for the Arkansas State Red Wolves.

== College career ==
At Arkansas State, Harris totaled 24 tackles as a true freshman in 2020, two interceptions as a sophomore in 2021, and 36 tackles, an interception and a team-best 10 pass breakups as a junior in 2022. He made a total of 31 appearances with the Red Wolves and tallied 71 tackles, 25 passes defended and three interceptions before transferring to the Oklahoma State Cowboys in 2023. In his first year at Oklahoma State, Harris redshirted. He posted one tackle in 2023 and eight as a backup in 2024 before having his best season in 2025. In his last year, 2025, Harris recorded 33 tackles.

== Professional career ==
Pre-draft measurables
Height	Weight	Arm length	Hand span	Wingspan	40-yard dash	10-yard split	20-yard split	20-yard shuttle	Three-cone drill	Vertical jump	Broad jump	Bench press
5 ft 11 3/4 in (1.82 m)	192 lb (87 kg)	30 1/2 in (0.77 m)	9 in (0.23 m)	6 ft 0 1/2 in (1.84 m)	4.45 s	1.59 s	2.62 s	4.23 s	6.85 s	39.5 in (1.00 m)	10 ft 9 in (3.28 m)	22 reps
All values from Pro Day

=== New England Patriots ===
After going unselected in the 2026 NFL draft, Harris signed with the New England Patriots as an undrafted free agent. He was waived by the Patriots on August 24.

=== Indianapolis Colts ===
On August 26, 2026, Harris signed with the Indianapolis Colts. Harris was waived by the Colts as a part of final roster cuts on August 30; he was re-signed to the team's practice squad the following day. Harris was elevated to the active roster for the Colts' Week 1 game against the Baltimore Ravens and made his NFL debut in the game, recording one tackle. He was signed to the active roster on October 27.
